= List of Most Played Juke Box Folk Records number ones of 1945 =

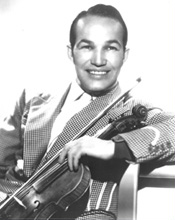
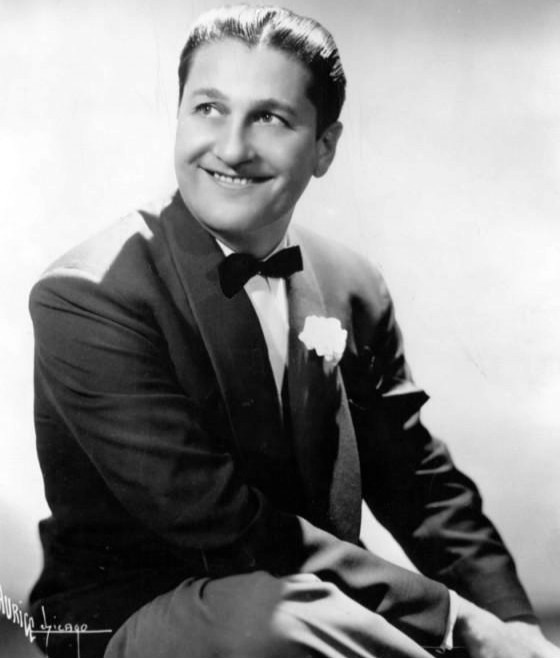
Spade Cooley (left) topped the chart with his song "Shame on You" in the spring. Later in the year, orchestra leader Lawrence Welk (right) and vocalist Red Foley took their recording of the song to number one.

From 1944 until 1957, Billboard magazine published a chart that ranked the top-performing country music songs in the United States, based on the number of times a song had been played in jukeboxes; until 1948 it was the magazine's only country music chart. In 1945, 14 different songs topped the chart, then published under the title Most Played Juke Box Folk Records, in 52 issues of the magazine. The term "country music" would not come into standard usage until the late 1940s and "folk music" was one of a number of terms used for the genre in earlier years. The chart ranked "the most popular Folk records on automatic phonographs thruout [sic] the nation", based on "reports from all the country's leading operating centers", which were averaged to produce the final placings. This methodology allowed for the possibility of records tying for a position, and on several occasions during 1945 two or more songs tied for the number one spot, including the issue of Billboard dated November 24, when four songs tied for the number-one position. The Juke Box Folk chart is considered part of the lineage of the current Hot Country Songs chart, which was first published in 1958.

At the start of the year, the song in the number one position was "I'm Wastin' My Tears on You" by Tex Ritter, which had been in the top spot since the issue of Billboard dated December 23, 1944; it remained at the top of the chart for four weeks in 1945. Ritter achieved a second number one later in the year with "You Two-Timed Me One Time Too Often", which spent 11 non-consecutive weeks at number one (including two in which it shared the top spot with other songs), the most by any song during the year. Ritter's total of 15 weeks at number one in 1945 was the highest by any artist. The longest unbroken run at number one was six weeks, by Al Dexter's "I'm Losing My Mind Over You" in February and March. As the chart was still in its infancy, the majority of the acts to top the chart in 1945 did so for the first time. One of the first-time chart-toppers was Jimmie Davis, who at the time of his number one success was combining his professional singing career with serving as the Governor of Louisiana.

Ritter was one of the most successful singing cowboys, having starred in Western films since the mid-1930s. Two other performers associated with such roles had number-one songs in 1945, Dick Thomas with "Sioux City Sue" and Gene Autry with "At Mail Call Today". Autry was the biggest star of the singing cowboy genre and a hugely successful performer across music, film and television from the 1930s until the 1950s. The lyrics of Autry's chart-topper, "At Mail Call Today," dealt with a soldier separated from his sweetheart, one of several military-themed songs to top the chart in the latter days of World War II. Texan fiddler Bob Wills, hailed as the "King of Western swing", topped the chart for the first time with the war-themed "Smoke on the Water", and later returned to the top spot with the patriotic "Stars and Stripes on Iwo Jima". In December he topped the chart again with "Silver Dew on the Blue Grass Tonight", making him the only artist to achieve three number ones in 1945. "Smoke on the Water" had already been a number one for Red Foley late the previous year, and in 1945 another song achieved the distinction of being a chart-topper for two different acts, as Spade Cooley reached the top spot with "Shame on You" in the spring and Foley, in collaboration with orchestra leader Lawrence Welk, took the song back to number one in November.

== Chart history ==
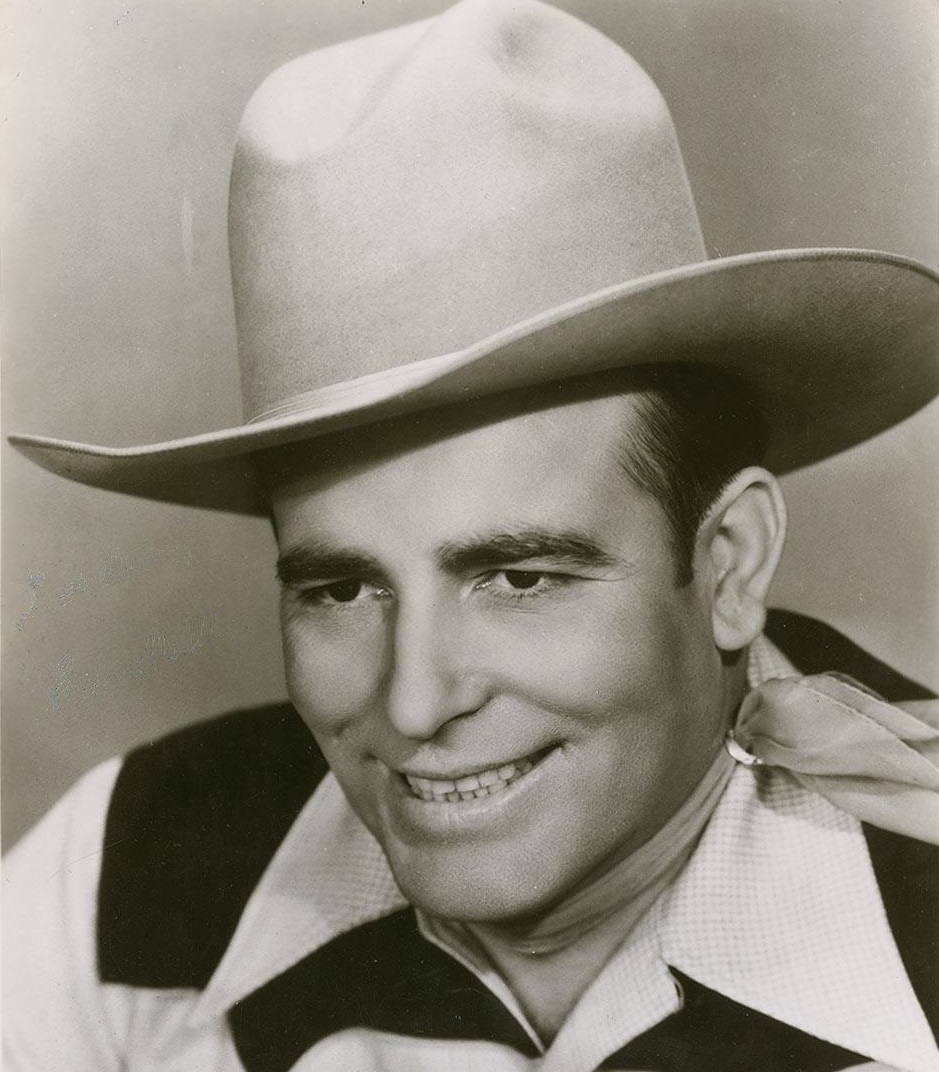
Bob Wills achieved three number ones in 1945.

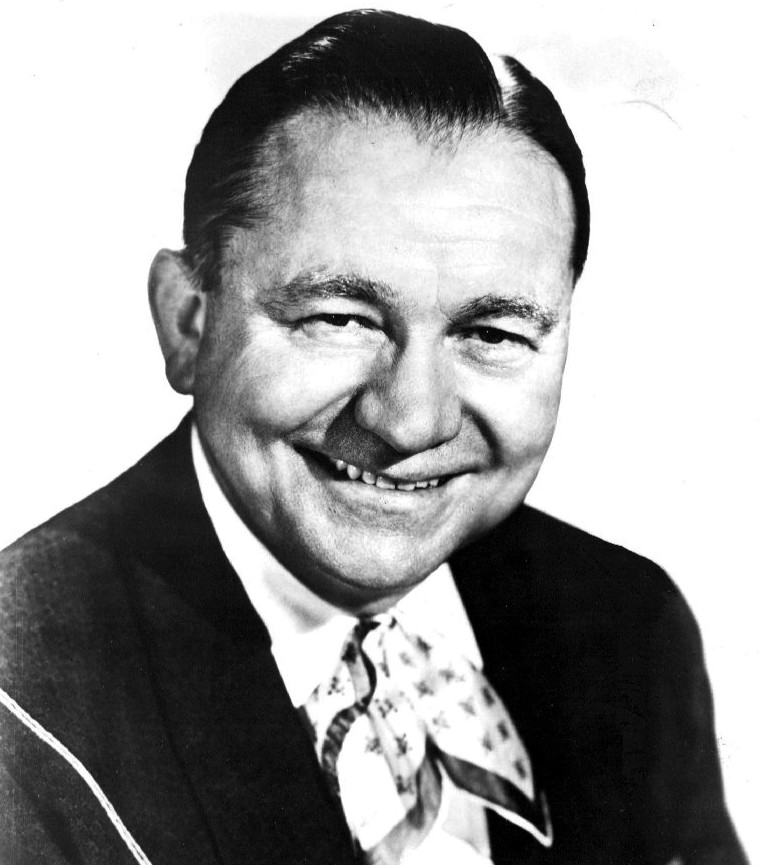
Two of Tex Ritter's songs topped the chart during the year.

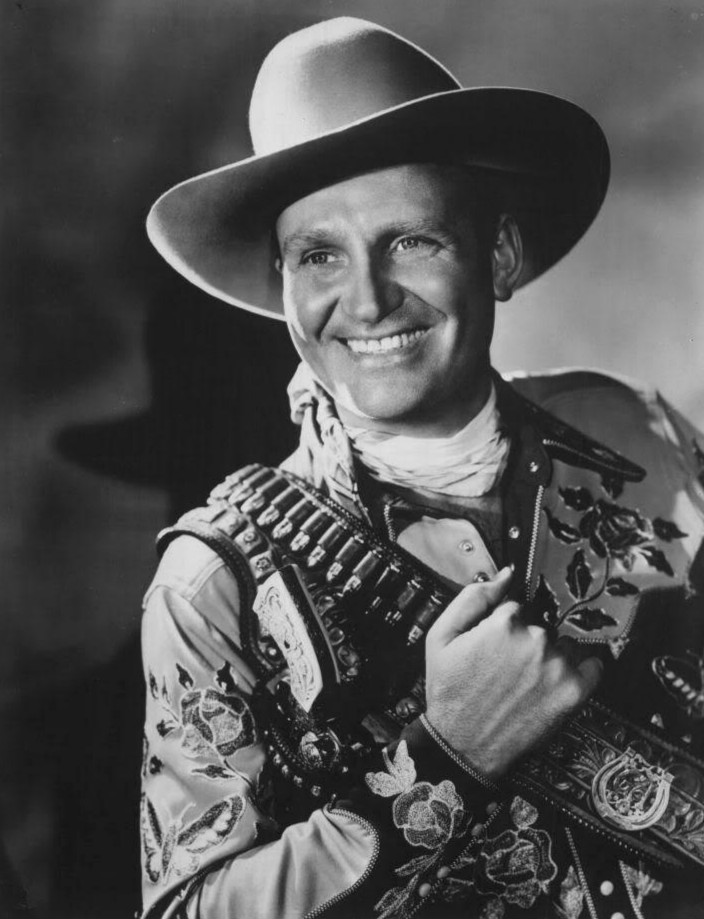
Gene Autry, a popular singing cowboy, reached number one with "At Mail Call Today".

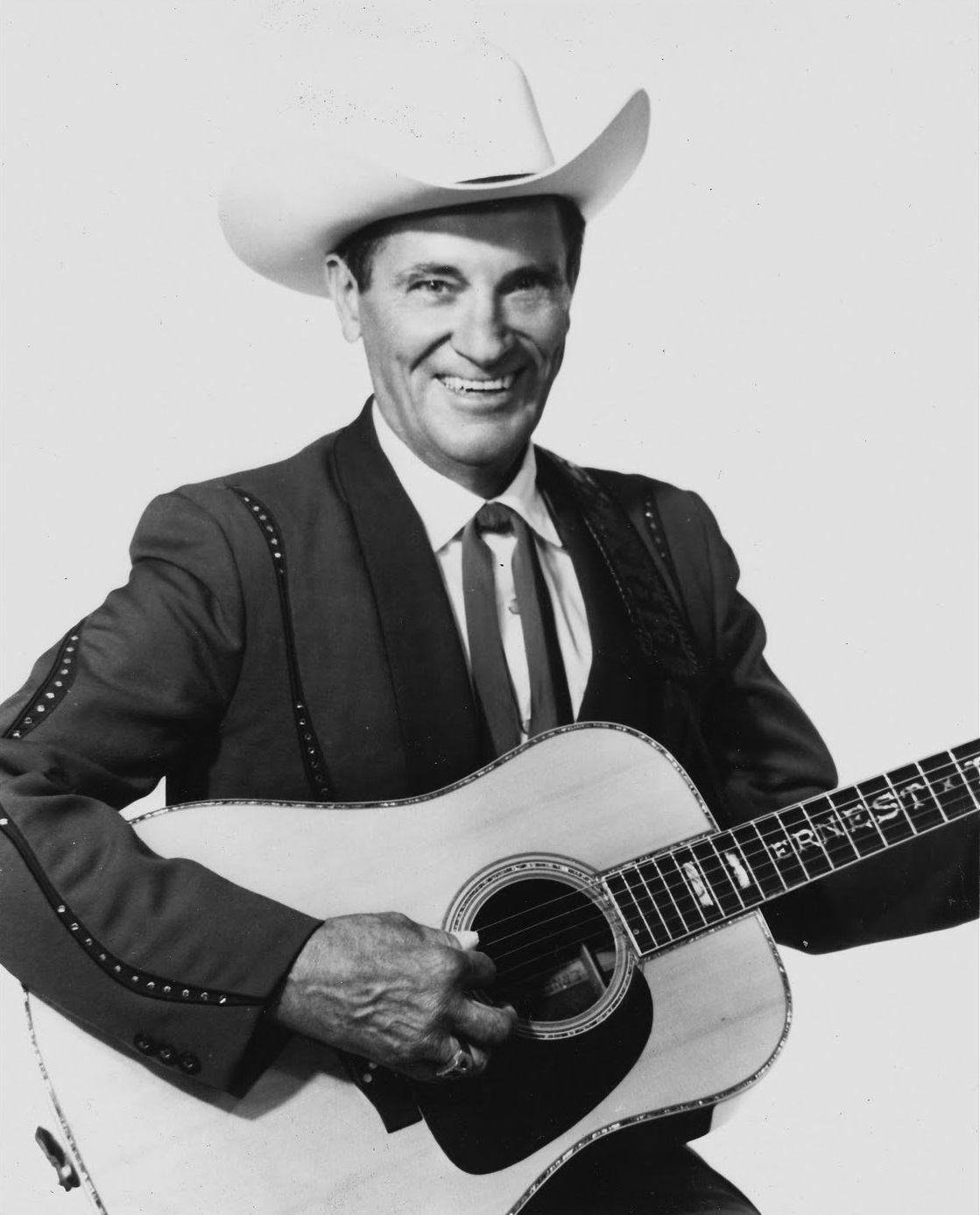
Ernest Tubb ended the year at number one.

Chart history
Issue date	Title	Artist(s)	Ref.
January 6	"I'm Wastin' My Tears on You"	Tex Ritter	
January 13	"I'm Wastin' My Tears on You"	Tex Ritter	
January 20	"I'm Wastin' My Tears on You"	Tex Ritter	
January 27	"I'm Wastin' My Tears on You"	Tex Ritter	
February 3	"I'm Losing My Mind Over You"	Al Dexter	
February 10	"I'm Losing My Mind Over You"	Al Dexter	
February 17	"I'm Losing My Mind Over You"	Al Dexter	
February 24	"I'm Losing My Mind Over You"	Al Dexter	
March 3	"I'm Losing My Mind Over You"	Al Dexter	
March 10	"I'm Losing My Mind Over You"	Al Dexter	
March 17	"There's a New Moon Over My Shoulder"	Jimmie Davis	
March 24	"I'm Losing My Mind Over You"	Al Dexter	
March 31	"Shame on You"	Spade Cooley	
April 7	"Shame on You"	Spade Cooley	
April 14	"Smoke on the Water"	Bob Wills	
April 21	"Shame on You"	Spade Cooley	
April 28	"Smoke on the Water"	Bob Wills	
May 5	"Shame on You"	Spade Cooley	
May 12	"Shame on You"	Spade Cooley	
May 19	"At Mail Call Today"	Gene Autry	
May 26	"At Mail Call Today"	Gene Autry	
June 2	"Shame on You"	Spade Cooley	
June 9	"At Mail Call Today"	Gene Autry	
June 16	"Shame on You"	Spade Cooley	
June 23	"Shame on You"	Spade Cooley	
June 30	"At Mail Call Today"	Gene Autry	
July 7	"Stars and Stripes on Iwo Jima"	Bob Wills	
July 14^{[a]}	"Shame on You"	Spade Cooley	
July 14^{[a]}	"At Mail Call Today"	Gene Autry	
July 21	"At Mail Call Today"	Gene Autry	
July 28^{[a]}	"At Mail Call Today"	Gene Autry	
July 28^{[a]}	"Oklahoma Hills"	Jack Guthrie	
August 4^{[a]}	"At Mail Call Today"	Gene Autry	
August 4^{[a]}	"Oklahoma Hills"	Jack Guthrie	
August 11	"Oklahoma Hills"	Jack Guthrie	
August 18	"Oklahoma Hills"	Jack Guthrie	
August 25	"You Two-Timed Me One Time Too Often"	Tex Ritter	
September 1^{[a]}	"You Two-Timed Me One Time Too Often"	Tex Ritter	
September 1^{[a]}	"Oklahoma Hills"	Jack Guthrie	
September 8	"You Two-Timed Me One Time Too Often"	Tex Ritter	
September 15	"Oklahoma Hills"	Jack Guthrie	
September 22	"You Two-Timed Me One Time Too Often"	Tex Ritter	
September 29	"You Two-Timed Me One Time Too Often"	Tex Ritter	
October 6	"You Two-Timed Me One Time Too Often"	Tex Ritter	
October 13	"You Two-Timed Me One Time Too Often"	Tex Ritter	
October 20	"You Two-Timed Me One Time Too Often"	Tex Ritter	
October 27	"With Tears in My Eyes"	Wesley Tuttle	
November 3	"You Two-Timed Me One Time Too Often"	Tex Ritter	
November 10	"You Two-Timed Me One Time Too Often"	Tex Ritter	
November 17	"With Tears in My Eyes"	Wesley Tuttle	
November 24^{[a]}	"With Tears in My Eyes"	Wesley Tuttle	
November 24^{[a]}	"You Two-Timed Me One Time Too Often"	Tex Ritter	
November 24^{[a]}	"Shame on You"	Red Foley and Lawrence Welk	
November 24^{[a]}	"Sioux City Sue"	Dick Thomas	
December 1	"With Tears in My Eyes"	Wesley Tuttle	
December 8	"It's Been So Long Darling"	Ernest Tubb	
December 15	"Silver Dew on the Blue Grass Tonight"	Bob Wills	
December 22	"It's Been So Long Darling"	Ernest Tubb	
December 29	"It's Been So Long Darling"	Ernest Tubb	

a. Multiple songs tied for the number one position.

== See also ==
- 1945 in music
- 1945 in country music
- List of artists who reached number one on the U.S. country chart
