= 1945 in country music =

This is a list of notable events in country music that took place in the year 1945.

== Events ==
- August 4 – The Billboard's American Folk Tunes column reported that Gene Autry had signed a long-term recording contract with Columbia Records. The source of the information was Art Satherly, described as "the grand old man of Western music". Art moved over to Columbia Records when CBS purchased American Record Corporation (ARC) in December 1938, and currently manages and produces Okeh Record's stable of artists, which includes Autry, Bob Wills, Ted Daffan, Johnny Bond, Al Dexter, Wiley Walker and Gene Sullivan, Spade Cooley, Roy Acuff and Fred Rose. Columbia is in the process of phasing out the Okeh label, and future releases will be on the parent label.

== Top hits of the year ==
=== Number one hits ===
(As certified by Billboard magazine)

| US | Single | Artist |
|---|---|---|
| February 3 | "I'm Losing My Mind Over You" | Al Dexter |
| "March 17 | "There's a New Moon Over My Shoulder" | Jimmie Davis |
| March 31 | "Shame on You" | Spade Cooley |
| "April 14 | "Smoke on the Water" | Bob Wills |
| May 19 | "At Mail Call Today" | Gene Autry |
| July 7 | "Stars and Stripes on Iwo Jima" | Bob Wills and His Texas Playboys |
| July 28 | "Oklahoma Hills" | Jack Guthrie |
| August 25 | "You Two-Timed Me One Time Too Often" | Tex Ritter |
| October 27 | "With Tears in My Eyes" | Wesley Tuttle |
| Nov 17 | "Sioux City Sue" | Dick Thomas |
| Nov 24 | "Shame on You" | Lawrence Welk Orchestra with Red Foley |
| Dec 8 | "It's Been So Long Darling" | Ernest Tubb |
| Dec 15 | "Silver Dew on the Blue Grass Tonight" | Bob Wills and His Texas Playboys |

== Top Hillbilly (Country) Recordings 1945 ==
"Shame On You" by Spade Cooley was easily the number one record with 292 points. Despite 11 weeks at no. 1, "You Two Timed Me One Time Too Often" finished second with 240 points, because "Shame On You" had 33 top ten weeks, to only 21 for the latter. "Sioux City Sue" had 30 top ten weeks, but only 4 at no. 1.

1945's year-end list of The Billboard's "Most Played Juke Box Folk Records" represented the first Country music (referred to at the time as "Hillbilly") chart in the lineage of today's "Hot Country Songs". Note that it was based on weekly reports supplied by a sampling of Juke Box operators nationwide; Billboard would not add Country Sales and Air Play charts until 1948 and 1950, respectively. Each week, a score of 15 points was assigned for the no. 1 record, 9 points for no. 2, 8 points for no. 3, and so on, and the total of all weeks determined the final rank. Records that entered the chart in December 1944, or remained on the chart after December 1945 received points for their full chart runs. Appearances on other Billboard charts had no effect on ranking, but are listed for reference. Additional information can be found at List of Most Played Juke Box Folk Records number ones of 1945.

| Rank | Artist | Title | Label | Recorded | Released | Chart Positions |
|---|---|---|---|---|---|---|
| 1 | Spade Cooley and His Western Band | "Shame on You" | Okeh 6731 | December 4, 1944 | January 1945 | US Hillbilly 1945 #1, Most Played Juke Box Folk Records #1 for 9 weeks, 38 total weeks, 292 points |
| 2 | Tex Ritter and His Texans | "You Two-Timed Me One Time Too Often" | Capitol 206 | May 1, 1945 | July 25, 1945 | US Hillbilly 1945 #2, Most Played Juke Box Folk Records #1 for 11 weeks, 22 total weeks, 240 points |
| 3 | Gene Autry | "At Mail Call Today" | Okeh 6737 | December 6, 1944 | March 10, 1945 | US Hillbilly 1945 #3, Most Played Juke Box Folk Records #1 for 8 weeks, 30 total weeks, 235 points |
| 4 | Dick Thomas | "Sioux City Sue" | National 5007 | February 6, 1945 | July 1945 | US Billboard 1945 #243, US Pop #21, US Hillbilly 1945 #4, Most Played Juke Box Folk Records #1 for 4 weeks, 37 total weeks, 228 points |
| 5 | Al Dexter and His Troopers | "I'm Losing My Mind Over You" | Okeh 6727 | March 21, 1942 | November 12, 1944 | US Hillbilly 1945 #5, Most Played Juke Box Folk Records #1 for 7 weeks, 34 total weeks, 196 points |
| 6 | Jack Guthrie and His Oklahomans | "Oklahoma Hills" | Capitol 201 | October 16, 1944 | June 20, 1945 | US Hillbilly 1945 #6, Most Played Juke Box Folk Records #1 for 6 weeks, 24 total weeks, 196 points |
| 7 | Tex Ritter and His Texans | "Jealous Heart" | Capitol 179 | September 20, 1944 | December 1944 | US Hillbilly 1945 #7, Most Played Juke Box Folk Records #2 for 2 weeks, 31 total weeks, 150 points |
| 8 | Jimmie Davis | "There's a New Moon Over My Shoulder" | Decca 6105 | March 23, 1944 | November 2, 1944 | US Hillbilly 1945 #8, Most Played Juke Box Folk Records #1 for 1 week, 30 total weeks, 141 points |
| 9 | Wesley Tuttle | "With Tears in My Eyes" | Capitol 216 | July 16, 1945 | September 1945 | US Hillbilly 1945 #9, Most Played Juke Box Folk Records #1 for 4 weeks, 18 total weeks, 138 points |
| 10 | Bob Wills and His Texas Playboys | "Silver Dew on the Blue Grass Tonight" | Columbia 36841 | April 20, 1945 | September 1945 | US Hillbilly 1945 #10, Most Played Juke Box Folk Records #1 for 3 weeks, 22 total weeks, 137 points |
| 11 | Bob Wills and His Texas Playboys | "Smoke on the Water" | Okeh 6736 | January 24, 1945 | February 20, 1945 | US Hillbilly 1945 #11, Most Played Juke Box Folk Records #1 for 2 weeks, 20 total weeks, 136 points |
| 12 | Ernest Tubb | "It's Been So Long Darling" | Decca 6112 | August 14, 1945 | September 26, 1945 | US Hillbilly 1945 #12, Most Played Juke Box Folk Records #1 for 3 weeks, 22 total weeks, 127 points |
| 13 | Bob Wills and His Texas Playboys | "Hang Your Head In Shame" | Okeh 6736 | January 26, 1945 | February 20, 1945 | US Hillbilly 1945 #13, Most Played Juke Box Folk Records #3 for 3 weeks, 22 total weeks, 117 points |
| 14 | Lawrence Welk Orchestra with Red Foley | "Shame on You" | Decca 18698 | June 26, 1945 | July 28, 1945 | US Billboard 1945 #212, US Pop #18, US Hillbilly 1945 #14, Most Played Juke Box Folk Records #1 for 1 week, 20 total weeks, 113 points |
| 15 | Ted Daffan's Texans | "Headin' Down the Wrong Highway" | Okeh 6744 | January 10, 1945 | June 1945 | US Hillbilly 1945 #15, Most Played Juke Box Folk Records #2 for 2 weeks, 25 total weeks, 100 points |
| 16 | Bob Wills and His Texas Playboys | "Stars and Stripes on Iwo Jima" | Okeh 6742 | April 20, 1945 | May 1945 | US Hillbilly 1945 #16, Most Played Juke Box Folk Records #1 for 1 week, 15 total weeks, 88 points |
| 17 | Ernest Tubb | "Tomorrow Never Comes" | Decca 6106 | January 13, 1944 | January 22, 1945 | US Hillbilly 1945 #17, Most Played Juke Box Folk Records #4 for 3 weeks, 21 total weeks, 80 points |
| 18 | Al Dexter and His Troopers | "Triflin' Gal" | Okeh 6740 | April 11, 1945 | June 4, 1945 | US Hillbilly 1945 #18, Most Played Juke Box Folk Records #2 for 3 weeks, 20 total weeks, 76 points |
| 19 | Al Dexter and His Troopers | "I'll Wait For You Dear" | Okeh 6727 | March 20, 1942 | November 12, 1944 | US Hillbilly 1945 #19, Most Played Juke Box Folk Records #2 for 1 week, 20 total weeks, 69 points |
| 20 | Ernest Tubb | "Careless Darlin'" | Decca 6110 | January 13, 1944 | June 6, 1945 | US Hillbilly 1945 #20, Most Played Juke Box Folk Records #3 for 2 weeks, 16 total weeks, 63 points |
| 21 | Bob Wills and His Texas Playboys | "Texas Playboy Rag" | Okeh 6736 | January 26, 1945 | February 20, 1945 | US Hillbilly 1945 #21, Most Played Juke Box Folk Records #4 for 4 weeks, 18 total weeks, 53 points |
| 22 | Gene Autry | "Gonna Build a Big Fence Around Texas" | Okeh 6728 | November 29, 1944 | December 1944 | US Hillbilly 1945 #22, Most Played Juke Box Folk Records #2 for 1 week, 15 total weeks, 50 points |
| 26 | Tex Ritter | "Christmas Carols By The Old Corral" | Capitol 223 | July 27, 1945 | November 1945 | US Hillbilly 1945 #26, Most Played Juke Box Folk Records #4 for 2 weeks, 7 total weeks, 20 points |
| 28 | Gene Autry | "Don't Fence Me In" | Okeh 6728 | November 29, 1944 | December 1944 | US Hillbilly 1945 #28, Most Played Juke Box Folk Records #5 for 1 week, 14 total weeks, 14 points |

== Births ==
- January 16 – Ronnie Milsap, blind, blue-eyed soul-styled singer who became one of country music's most popular entertainers of the 1970s and 1980s.
- March 14 – Michael Martin Murphey, Western-styled singer-songwriter who enjoyed mainstream success in the 1980s as a country-pop performer.
- May 23 – Misty Morgan, singer-songwriter who, with husband Jack Blanchard, had a string of animal-themed hit recordings in the 1970s.
- June 5 – Don Reid, lead singer and main songwriter of The Statler Brothers.
- June 20 – Anne Murray, Canadian vocalist who became one of that country's most successful country music performers during the 1970s and 1980s.
