= List of Most Played Juke Box Folk Records number ones of 1946 =

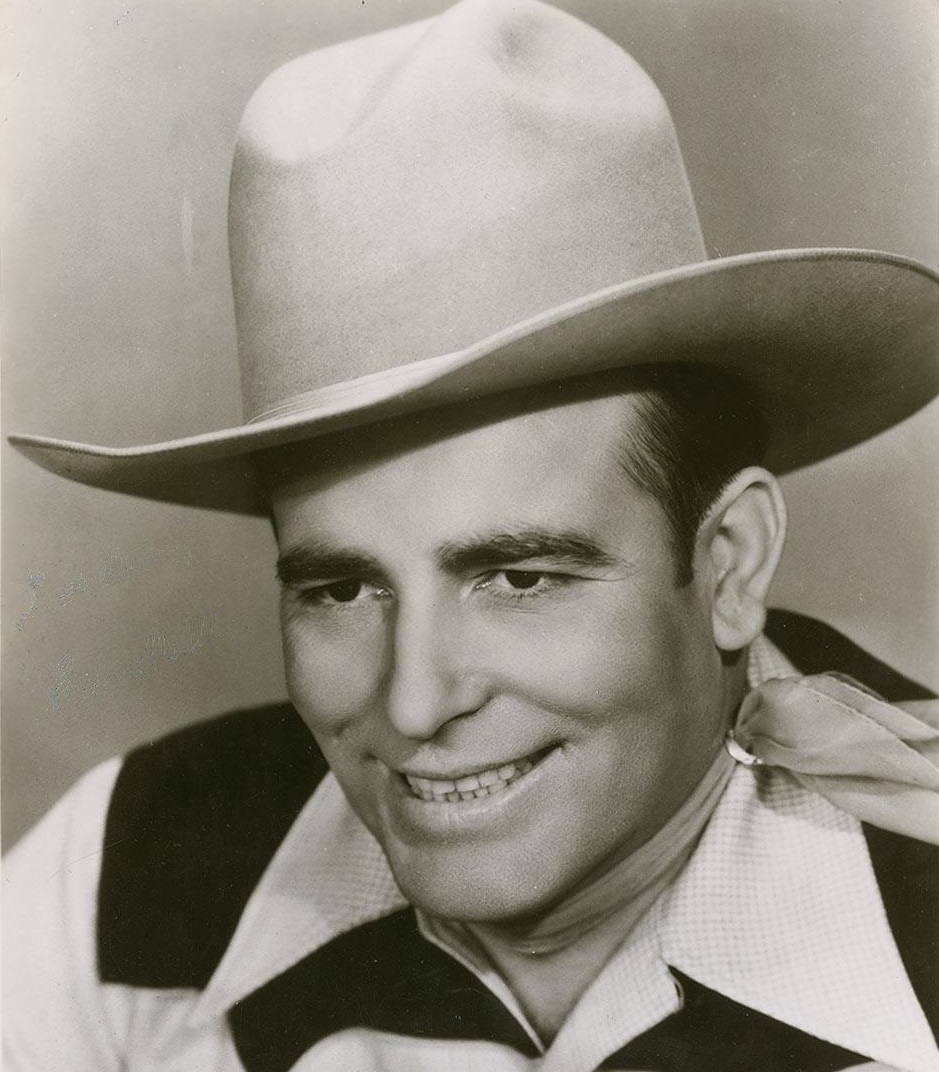
Three songs by Bob Wills reached number one in 1946, including "New Spanish Two Step", which spent 15 consecutive weeks in the top spot.

From 1944 until 1957, Billboard magazine published a chart that ranked the top-performing country music songs in the United States, based on the number of times a song had been played in jukeboxes; until 1948 it was the magazine's only country music chart. In 1946, nine different songs topped the chart, which was published under the title Most Played Juke Box Folk Records. The chart was compiled based on a survey of jukebox operators nationwide, and its methodology allowed for the possibility of records tying for a position. On several occasions during 1946 two or more songs tied for the number-one spot, including the issue of Billboard dated February 2, when four songs tied for the peak position. The Juke Box Folk chart is considered part of the lineage of the current Hot Country Songs chart, which was first published in 1958.

In 1946 the top spot was dominated by two songs which each spent 16 weeks at number one and which between them topped the chart from February to September. In the issue of Billboard dated February 2, "Guitar Polka" by Al Dexter reached number one for the first time, albeit jointly with three other songs. After one week out of the top spot it returned to number one, where it spent fifteen consecutive weeks, one of them jointly with "New Spanish Two Step" by Bob Wills. After Dexter's run at number one ended, Wills's song returned to the top spot and also spent fifteen consecutive weeks atop the chart. Wills, who is widely known as the "King of Western swing", had topped the chart earlier in the year with "Silver Dew on the Blue Grass Tonight" and "White Cross on Okinawa" and was the only artist to take three different songs to number one in 1946. Dexter, however, had the highest number of total weeks at number one, spending 21 weeks in total (including two tied weeks) atop the chart with "Guitar Polka" and "Wine Women and Song". Wills and Dexter were the only acts with more than one chart-topper during the year.

In October, Merle Travis achieved his first number one with "Divorce Me C.O.D.", which spent 11 non-consecutive weeks in the top spot in 1946 and was at number one at the end of the year. Although Travis would only experience a short spell of chart success, achieving only one further chart-topping single, he would remain active until his death in 1983 and come to be regarded as one of the most influential guitarists in the country genre. Two singers who had each topped the chart several times in its first three years of publication did so for the last time in 1946. Al Dexter's second chart-topper of the year, "Wine Women and Song", would prove to be his final appearance in the top spot. After 1948 he did not appear in the chart at all and concentrated on running his club in Dallas. Tex Ritter also topped the chart for the last time in 1946. He would be absent from the country chart altogether for more than a decade after 1950 but experience something of a career revival in the 1960s when he appeared regularly at the Grand Ole Opry.

== Chart history ==
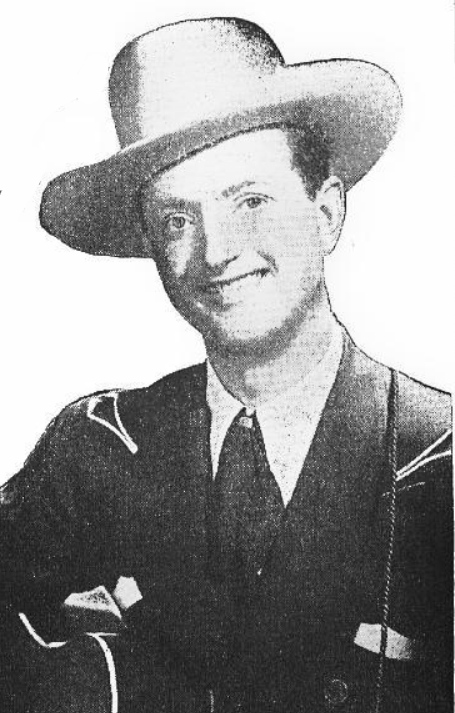
Al Dexter had two number ones in 1946.

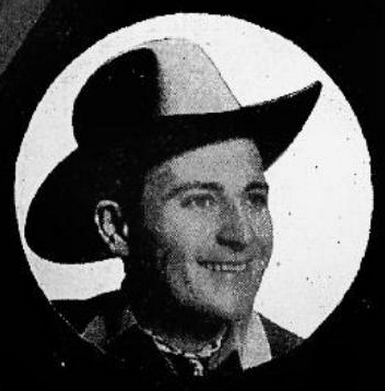
Dick Thomas's "Sioux City Sue" was one of four songs that shared the top spot in the issue of Billboard dated February 2.

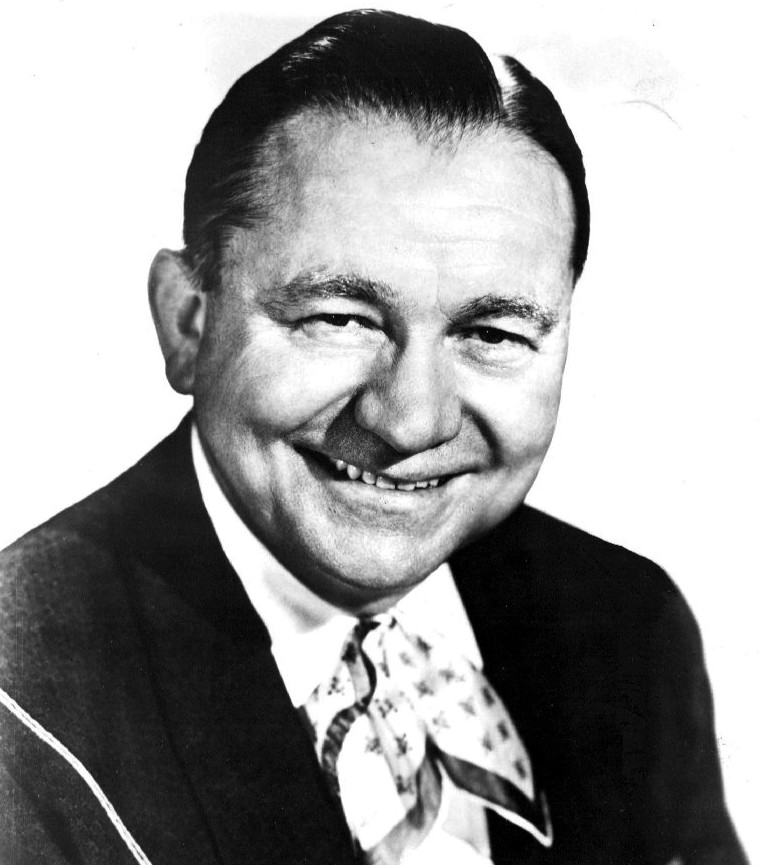
"You Will Have to Pay" was the final number one for Tex Ritter.

Chart history
Issue date	Title	Artist(s)	Ref.
January 5^{[a]}	"Silver Dew on the Blue Grass Tonight"	Bob Wills	
January 5^{[a]}	"White Cross on Okinawa"	Bob Wills	
January 5^{[a]}	"You Will Have to Pay"	Tex Ritter	
January 12	"It's Been So Long Darling"	Ernest Tubb	
January 19	"You Will Have to Pay"	Tex Ritter	
January 26	"Sioux City Sue"	Dick Thomas	
February 2^{[a]}	"Sioux City Sue"	Dick Thomas	
February 2^{[a]}	"Silver Dew on the Blue Grass Tonight"	Bob Wills	
February 2^{[a]}	"You Will Have to Pay"	Tex Ritter	
February 2^{[a]}	"Guitar Polka"	Al Dexter	
February 9	"Sioux City Sue"	Dick Thomas	
February 16	"Guitar Polka"	Al Dexter	
February 23	"Guitar Polka"	Al Dexter	
March 2	"Guitar Polka"	Al Dexter	
March 9	"Guitar Polka"	Al Dexter	
March 16	"Guitar Polka"	Al Dexter	
March 23	"Guitar Polka"	Al Dexter	
March 30	"Guitar Polka"	Al Dexter	
April 6	"Guitar Polka"	Al Dexter	
April 13	"Guitar Polka"	Al Dexter	
April 20	"Guitar Polka"	Al Dexter	
April 27	"Guitar Polka"	Al Dexter	
May 4	"Guitar Polka"	Al Dexter	
May 11	"Guitar Polka"	Al Dexter	
May 18^{[a]}	"Guitar Polka"	Al Dexter	
May 18^{[a]}	"New Spanish Two Step"	Bob Wills	
May 25	"Guitar Polka"	Al Dexter	
June 1	"New Spanish Two Step"	Bob Wills	
June 8	"New Spanish Two Step"	Bob Wills	
June 15	"New Spanish Two Step"	Bob Wills	
June 22	"New Spanish Two Step"	Bob Wills	
June 29	"New Spanish Two Step"	Bob Wills	
July 6	"New Spanish Two Step"	Bob Wills	
July 13	"New Spanish Two Step"	Bob Wills	
July 20	"New Spanish Two Step"	Bob Wills	
July 27	"New Spanish Two Step"	Bob Wills	
August 3	"New Spanish Two Step"	Bob Wills	
August 10	"New Spanish Two Step"	Bob Wills	
August 17	"New Spanish Two Step"	Bob Wills	
August 24	"New Spanish Two Step"	Bob Wills	
August 31	"New Spanish Two Step"	Bob Wills	
September 7	"New Spanish Two Step"	Bob Wills	
September 14	"Wine Women and Song"	Al Dexter	
September 21	"Wine Women and Song"	Al Dexter	
September 28	"Wine Women and Song"	Al Dexter	
October 5	"Wine Women and Song"	Al Dexter	
October 12	"Divorce Me C.O.D."	Merle Travis	
October 19	"Wine Women and Song"	Al Dexter	
October 26	"Divorce Me C.O.D."	Merle Travis	
November 2	"Divorce Me C.O.D."	Merle Travis	
November 9	"Divorce Me C.O.D."	Merle Travis	
November 16	"Divorce Me C.O.D."	Merle Travis	
November 23	"Divorce Me C.O.D."	Merle Travis	
November 30	"Divorce Me C.O.D."	Merle Travis	
December 7	"Divorce Me C.O.D."	Merle Travis	
December 14	"Divorce Me C.O.D."	Merle Travis	
December 21	"Divorce Me C.O.D."	Merle Travis	
December 28	"Divorce Me C.O.D."	Merle Travis	

a. Multiple songs tied for the number one position.

== See also ==
- 1946 in music
- 1946 in country music
- List of artists who reached number one on the U.S. country chart
