= 1946 in country music =

This is a list of notable events in country music that took place in the year 1946.

== Top hits of the year ==
=== Number one hits ===
(As certified by Billboard magazine)

US	Single	Artist
January 5	"You Will Have To Pay"	Tex Ritter
January 5	"White Cross on Okinawa"	Bob Wills and His Texas Playboys
February 2	"Guitar Polka"	Al Dexter
May 18	"New Spanish Two Step"	Bob Wills and His Texas Playboys
Sept 14	"Wine, Women and Song"	Al Dexter
October 12	"Divorce Me C.O.D."	Merle Travis

== Top Hillbilly (Country) Recordings 1946 ==
Billboard Most-Played Folk Records of 1946 is a year-end list compiled by The Billboard, printed in the January 4, 1947, issue. It includes rankings for the calendar year only, handicapping records at the beginning and end of the year such as "The Old Lamp-Lighter", which lost more than half of its points. For all year-end charts on these pages, records that enter the chart in December of the previous year, or remain on the chart after December of the current year, receive points for their full chart runs. Each week, a score of 15 points is assigned for the no. 1 record, 9 points for no. 2, 8 points for no. 3, and so on, and the total of all weeks determined the final rank. Additional information can also be found at List of Most Played Juke Box Folk Records number ones of 1946.

Rank	Artist	Title	Label	Recorded	Released	Chart Positions
1	Al Dexter and His Troopers	"Guitar Polka"	Columbia 36898	March 21, 1942	January 1946	US BB 1946 #158, US #12, US Hillbilly 1946 #1, USHB #1 for 16 weeks, 32 total weeks
2	Bob Wills and His Texas Playboys	"New Spanish Two Step"	Columbia 36966	May 4, 1946	May 18, 1946	US BB 1946 #188, US #14, US Hillbilly 1946 #2, USHB #1 for 16 weeks, 26 total weeks
3	Merle Travis	"Divorce Me C.O.D."	Capitol 290	July 9, 1946	September 6, 1946	US BB 1946 #161, US #12, US Hillbilly 1946 #3, USHB #1 for 14 weeks, 26 total weeks
4	Ernest Tubb	"Rainbow at Midnight"	Decca 46018	September 17, 1946	October 1946	US Hillbilly 1946 #4, USHB #1 for 2 weeks, 20 total weeks
5	Eddy Arnold and his Tennessee Plowboys	"That's How Much I Love You"	RCA Victor 20-1948	March 20, 1946	September 1946	US Hillbilly 1946 #5, USHB #2 for 4 weeks, 29 total weeks
6	Al Dexter and His Troopers	"Wine Women and Song"	Columbia 37062	April 5, 1946	July 29, 1946	US Hillbilly 1946 #6, USHB #1 for 5 weeks, 15 total weeks
7	Zeke Manners and His Band	"Sioux City Sue"	RCA Victor 20-1797	January 1946	February 1946	US Hillbilly 1946 #7, USHB #2 for 9 weeks, 25 total weeks
8	Bob Wills and His Texas Playboys	"Roly Poly"	Columbia 36966	January 24, 1945	March 12, 1946	US Hillbilly 1946 #8, USHB #3 for 8 weeks, 24 total weeks
9	Elton Britt	"Someday"	Bluebird 33-0521	November 22, 1944	January 29, 1945	US Hillbilly 1946 #9, USHB #2 for 5 weeks, 30 total weeks
10	Hoosier Hot Shots and Two Ton Baker	"Sioux City Sue"	Decca 18745	November 13, 1945	January 1946	US BB 1946 #178, US #26, US Hillbilly 1946 #10, USHB #2 for 1 week, 22 total weeks
11	Ernest Tubb	"Filipino Baby"	Decca 46019	September 17, 1946	October 9, 1946	US Hillbilly 1946 #11, USHB #2 for 4 weeks, 21 total weeks
12	Tex Ritter and His Texans	"You Will Have To Pay"	Capitol 223	September 27, 1944	November 24, 1945	US Hillbilly 1946 #12, USHB #1 for 3 weeks, 15 total weeks
13	Merle Travis	"Cincinnati Lou"	Capitol 258	March 18, 1946	May 12, 1946	US BB 1946 #226, US #16, US Hillbilly 1946 #13, USHB #2 for 4 weeks, 14 total weeks
14	Gene Autry	"Have I Told You Lately That I Love You?"	Columbia 37079	October 1, 1945	September 2, 1946	US Hillbilly 1946 #14, USHB #5 for 1 week, 14 total weeks
15	Spade Cooley and His Western Band	"Detour"	Columbia 36935	January 3, 1946	February 18, 1946	US Hillbilly 1946 #15, USHB #2 for 1 weeks, 18 total weeks
16	Tex Ritter	"When You Leave Don't Slam The Door"	Capitol 296	July 31, 1946	September 2, 1946	US Hillbilly 1946 #16, USHB #3 for 1 weeks, 18 total weeks
17	Bob Wills and His Texas Playboys	"Stay A Little Longer"	Columbia 37097	January 24, 1946	October 14, 1946	US Hillbilly 1946 #17, USHB #2 for 2 weeks, 13 total weeks
18	The Hoosier Hot Shots and Two Ton Baker	"Someday (You'll Want Me to Want You)"	Decca 18738	November 13, 1945	December 1945	US BB 1946 #238, US #16, US Hillbilly 1946 #18, USHB #3 for 4 weeks, 21 total weeks
19	Merle Travis	"No Vacancy"	Capitol 258	March 18, 1946	May 12, 1946	US BB 1946 #226, US #16, US Hillbilly 1946 #19, USHB #3 for 3 weeks, 15 total weeks
20	Spade Cooley and His Western Band	"You Can't Break My Heart"	Columbia 36935	July 24, 1945	February 18, 1946	US Hillbilly 1946 #20, USHB #3 for 1 weeks, 22 total weeks

== Births ==
- January 11 – Naomi Judd, mother half of The Judds (died 2022).
- January 19 – Dolly Parton, country singer-songwriter, actress, businesswoman and philanthropist, major star from the 1960s onwards (died 2026).
- March 20 – Ranger Doug, "The Idol of American Youth", member of Riders in the Sky.
- July 15 – Linda Ronstadt, singer-songwriter with strong influences in both country and rock music.
- August 11 – John Conlee, former mortician and disc jockey who became one of the most consistent performers of the late 1970s and 1980s.
- October 2 – Jo-El Sonnier, singer-songwriter and accordionist who perform country music and Cajun music.
- November 2 – Howard Bellamy, of The Bellamy Brothers.
- November 5 – Gram Parsons, influential country rock and alt-country singer-songwriter-guitarist who was a member of such bands as The Byrds and The Flying Burrito Brothers, as well as a solo act (died 1973).
- December 11 – Tony Brown, record producer.
- December 25 – Jimmy Buffett, singer best known for his "island escapism"-styled music (died 2023).

== Deaths ==
- July 13 – Riley Puckett, 52, vocalist with the Skillet Lickers (blood poisoning).
