= List of artists who reached number one on the U.S. Hot Country chart =

This is a list of recording artists who have reached number one on the weekly country music singles chart published by Billboard magazine.

From January 8, 1944 to May 15, 1948, the only country music chart was the Juke Box chart. A Best Sellers chart debuted that week, followed by a Jockeys chart on the week of December 10, 1949. The last Juke Box chart was published for the week of June 15, 1957, and starting on the chart week of October 13, 1958, the Best Sellers and Jockeys charts were consolidated into one singles chart called Hot C&W Sides. This chart was renamed Hot Country Singles on November 3, 1962, Hot Country Singles & Tracks on February 17, 1990, Hot Country Songs on April 30, 2005, and the chart in late 2012 the chart included streaming and downloads, then the Country Airplay chart became a separate entity.

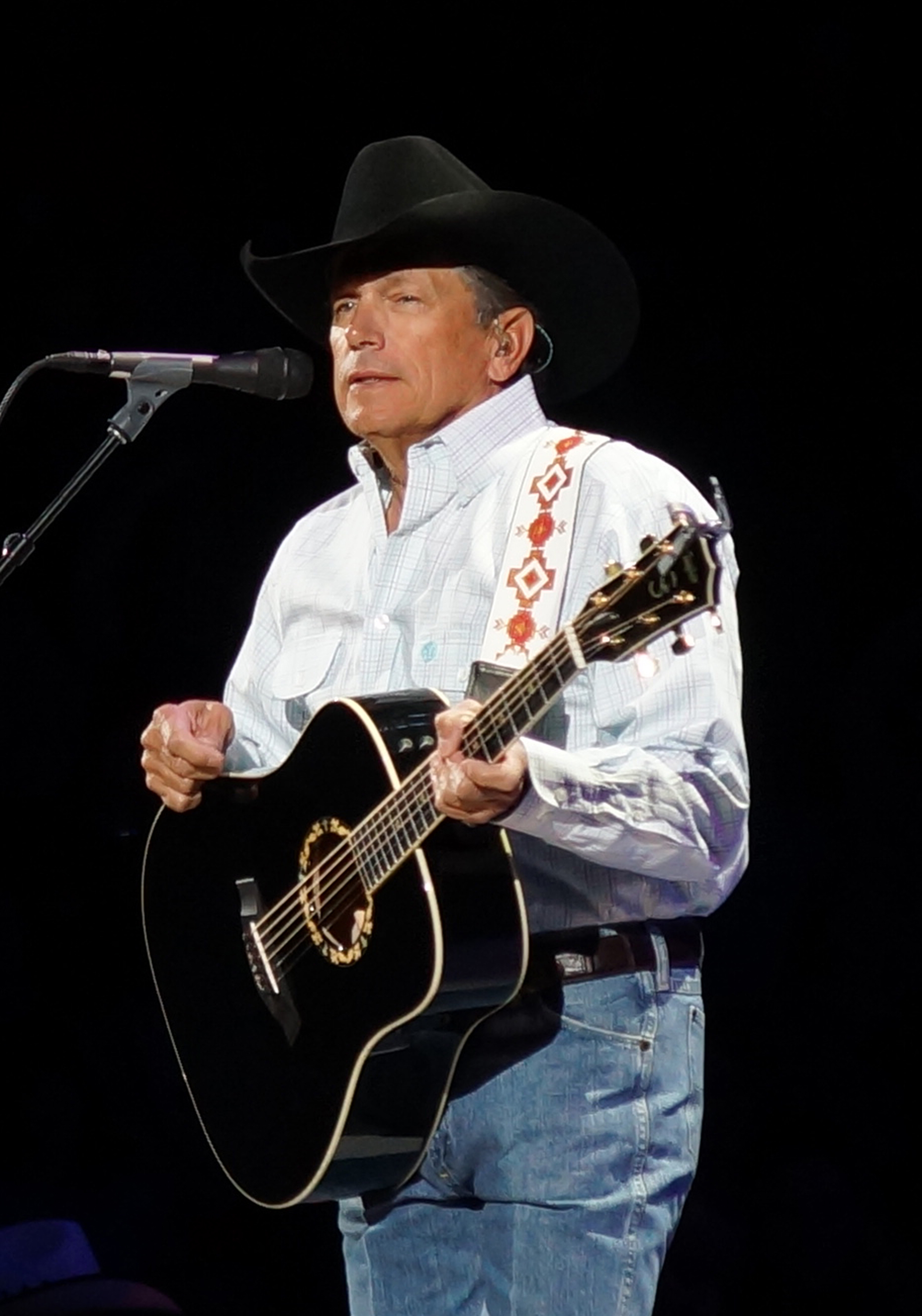
George Strait has the most number-ones on the Hot Country Chart with 44.

== List inclusions ==
- All acts are listed alphabetically; solo artists by last name, and groups by group name excluding "A," "An" and "The." Group names that include a person's full name are sorted by the last name of that person; for instance, Zac Brown Band is listed under B.
- Each act's total of Number One hits is shown after their name.
- Number ones that only topped Country Airplay are not included since the chart began to include sales and streaming during 2012.
- Any song that topped pre-Hot C&W Sides and jockeys chart are not counted.
- Artists who are officially name-checked are counted here, including one-time pairings of otherwise solo artists and "featured" acts.
- "Highwayman" is credited to the supergroup The Highwaymen, which comprised Johnny Cash, Waylon Jennings, Willie Nelson and Kris Kristofferson. This song does not count towards those artists' individual totals.
- "Forever Country" is credited to Artists of Then, Now & Forever, which comprised 30 different country artists. This song does not count towards those artists' individual totals.

== A ==
- Trace Adkins (4)
- Rhett Akins (1)
- Alabama (33)
- Lauren Alaina (1)
- Jason Aldean (10)
- Gary Allan (4)
- Bill Anderson (7)
- John Anderson (5)
- Lynn Anderson (5)
- Jessica Andrews (1)
- Oliver Anthony Music (1)
- Eddy Arnold (7)
- Artists of Then, Now & Forever (1)
- Ernest Ashworth (1)
- Leon Ashley (1)
- Rodney Atkins (6)

== B ==
- Kelsea Ballerini (1)
- Gabby Barrett (2)
- The Band Perry (3)
- Moe Bandy (2)
- Bobby Bare (1)
- The Bellamy Brothers (10)
- Dierks Bentley (11)
- John Berry (1)
- Beyoncé (1)
- Justin Bieber (1)
- Big & Rich (1)
- BigXthaPlug (1)
- Clint Black (13)
- Lisa Hartman Black (1)
- Jack Blanchard & Misty Morgan (1)
- Bon Jovi (1)
- Debby Boone (1)
- Craig Wayne Boyd (1)
- Lee Brice (1)
- Chad Brock (1)
- Lane Brody (1)
- Garth Brooks (19)
- Karen Brooks (1)
- Brooks & Dunn (20)
- Blanco Brown (1)
- Kane Brown (3)
- Jim Ed Brown (1)
- T. Graham Brown (3)
- Zac Brown Band (8)
- The Browns (1)
- Ed Bruce (1)
- Luke Bryan (12)
- Zach Bryan (2)
- Jimmy Buffett (2)
- Carl Butler and Pearl (1)
- Sarah Buxton (1)
- Tracy Byrd (2)

== C ==
- Chris Cagle (1)
- Glen Campbell (5)
- Henson Cargill (1)
- The Carlisles (1)
- Mary Chapin Carpenter (1)
- Jeff Carson (1)
- Deana Carter (3)
- Lionel Cartwright (1)
- Johnny Cash (13)
- Rosanne Cash (11)
- Ray Charles (1)
- Kenny Chesney (23)
- Mark Chesnutt (8)
- Eric Church (2)
- Roy Clark (1)
- Terri Clark (2)
- Kelly Clarkson (1)
- Patsy Cline (2)
- Anita Cochran (1)
- Nat "King" Cole (1)
- Jessi Colter (1)
- Luke Combs (6)
- John Conlee (7)
- Earl Thomas Conley (18)
- Spade Cooley (1)
- Cowboy Copas (1)
- Easton Corbin (2)
- Helen Cornelius (1)
- Billy "Crash" Craddock (3)
- Bing Crosby (1)
- Rodney Crowell (5)
- Mike Curb Congregation (1)
- Billy Currington (6)
- Billy Ray Cyrus (1)

== D ==
- Dan + Shay (3)
- Charlie Daniels Band (1)
- Dave & Sugar (3)
- Jimmie Davis (1)
- Jordan Davis (1)
- Linda Davis (1)
- Paul Davis (2)
- The Davis Sisters (1)
- Billy Dean (1)
- Jimmy Dean (2)
- Delmore Brothers (1)
- John Denver (3)
- The Desert Rose Band (2)
- Al Dexter (7)
- Diamond Rio (5)
- Little Jimmy Dickens (1)
- Joe Diffie (5)
- Dixie Chicks (6)
- Roy Drusky (1)
- Dave Dudley (1)
- Johnny Duncan (3)
- Holly Dunn (2)

== E ==
- Sheena Easton (1)
- Clint Eastwood (1)
- Eli Young Band (2)
- Emerson Drive (1)
- Sara Evans (5)
- Exile (10)

== F ==
- Barbara Fairchild (1)
- Donna Fargo (6)
- Freddy Fender (4)
- Flatt & Scruggs (1)
- Florida Georgia Line (6)
- Red Foley (10)
- Tennessee Ernie Ford (3)
- The Forester Sisters (5)
- Janie Fricke (9)
- David Frizzell (2)
- Lefty Frizzell (6)

== G ==
- Larry Gatlin & the Gatlin Brothers (3)
- Crystal Gayle (18)
- Don Gibson (3)
- Brantley Gilbert (3)
- Vince Gill (5)
- Mickey Gilley (17)
- Jim Glaser (1)
- Bobby Goldsboro (1)
- Vern Gosdin (3)
- Josh Gracin (1)
- Jack Greene (5)
- Lee Greenwood (7)
- Jack Guthrie and His Oklahomans (1)

== H ==
- Merle Haggard (38)
- Tom T. Hall (7)
- George Hamilton IV (1)
- Emmylou Harris (7)
- Freddie Hart (6)
- Hawkshaw Hawkins (1)
- Hunter Hayes (1)
- Wade Hayes (1)
- Walker Hayes (1)
- Heartland (1)
- Bobby Helms (2)
- Ty Herndon (3)
- Highway 101 (4)
- The Highwaymen (1)
- Faith Hill (9)
- Goldie Hill (1)
- Steve Holy (2)
- Johnny Horton (3)
- David Houston (7)
- Jan Howard (1)
- Sam Hunt (4)
- Ferlin Husky (3)

== I ==
- Julio Iglesias (1)
- Jack Ingram (1)

== J ==
- Alan Jackson (26)
- Stonewall Jackson (2)
- Sonny James (23)
- Waylon Jennings (15)
- Johnnie & Jack (1)
- Cody Johnson (1)
- Michael Johnson (2)
- George Jones (13)
- Tom Jones (1)
- The Judds (14)
- Wynonna Judd (4)

== K ==
- Toby Keith (20)
- The Kendalls (3)
- Sammy Kershaw (1)
- Claude King (1)
- Pee Wee King (1)
- Kris Kristofferson
- Alison Krauss (1)

== L ==
- Lady A (6)
- LANCO (1)
- Ella Langley (1)
- Miranda Lambert (5)
- Cristy Lane (1)
- Aaron Lewis (1)
- Tracy Lawrence (8)
- Dickey Lee (1)
- Johnny Lee (5)
- Jerry Lee Lewis (6)
- Little Big Town (3)
- Little Texas (1)
- Hank Locklin (2)
- Dave Loggins (1)
- Lonestar (9)
- The Louvin Brothers (1)
- Love and Theft (1)
- Patty Loveless (5)
- Loretta Lynn (16)

== M ==
- Warner Mack (1)
- Cledus Maggard & the Citizen's Band (1)
- Post Malone (1)
- Barbara Mandrell (6)
- Marshmello (1)
- Kathy Mattea (4)
- Mac McAnally (1)
- Martina McBride (5)
- C. W. McCall (1)
- Charly McClain (3)
- Neal McCoy (2)
- Mindy McCready (1)
- Mel McDaniel (1)
- Skeets McDonald (1)
- Ronnie McDowell (2)
- Reba McEntire (24)
- Tim McGraw (24)
- Tate McRae (1)
- Jo Dee Messina (6)
- Roger Miller (2)
- Ronnie Milsap (35)
- Priscilla Mitchell (1)
- John Michael Montgomery (7)
- Melba Montgomery (1)
- Montgomery Gentry (5)
- Niko Moon (1)
- Justin Moore (2)
- Kip Moore (1)
- Craig Morgan (1)
- George Morgan (1)
- Lorrie Morgan (3)
- Gary Morris (5)
- Maren Morris (1)
- Moon Mullican (1)
- Michael Martin Murphey (2)
- David Lee Murphy (1)
- Anne Murray (10)
- Kacey Musgraves (1)

== N ==
- David Nail (1)
- Willie Nelson (21)
- Jennifer Nettles (1)
- Juice Newton (4)
- Joe Nichols (3)
- Jerrod Niemann (1)
- Nitty Gritty Dirt Band (3)

== O ==
- The Oak Ridge Boys (17)
- The O'Kanes (1)
- Jamie O'Neal (2)
- K. T. Oslin (4)
- Marie Osmond (4)
- James Otto (1)
- Paul Overstreet (2)
- Jake Owen (3)
- Buck Owens (21)

== P ==
- Brad Paisley (18)
- Dolly Parton (25)
- Johnny Paycheck (1)
- Leon Payne (1)
- Carl Perkins (1)
- Michael Peterson (1)
- Tom Petty (1)
- Webb Pierce (13)
- Pink (1)
- Elvis Presley (11)
- Ray Price (8)
- Charley Pride (29)
- Jeanne Pruett (1)

== R ==
- Eddie Rabbitt (17)
- Wayne Raney (1)
- Rascal Flatts (12)
- Eddy Raven (6)
- Collin Raye (4)
- Jerry Reed (3)
- Del Reeves (1)
- Jim Reeves (11)
- Mike Reid (1)
- Restless Heart (6)
- Reverend Ike (1)
- Bebe Rexha (1)
- Thomas Rhett (2)
- Charlie Rich (9)
- Ricochet (1)
- Jeannie C. Riley (1)
- LeAnn Rimes (1)
- Tex Ritter (3)
- Chappell Roan (1)
- Marty Robbins (16)
- Judy Rodman (1)
- Johnny Rodriguez (6)
- Kenny Rogers (21)
- Linda Ronstadt (2)
- Darius Rucker (6)
- Leon Russell (1)

== S ==
- S-K-O (1)
- Sawyer Brown (3)
- John Schneider (4)
- Dan Seals (11)
- Shaboozey (1)
- Kevin Sharp (1)
- Blake Shelton (14)
- Ricky Van Shelton (10)
- Shenandoah (5)
- Jean Shepard (1)
- T. G. Sheppard (14)
- Ricky Skaggs (11)
- Cal Smith (3)
- Carl Smith (5)
- Connie Smith (1)
- Margo Smith (2)
- Sammi Smith (1)
- Hank Snow (7)
- Red Sovine (3)
- Billie Jo Spears (1)
- Joe Stampley (4)
- Chris Stapleton (3)
- The Statler Brothers (4)
- Gary Stewart (1)
- Wynn Stewart (1)
- Doug Stone (4)
- George Strait (44)
- Sugarland (5)
- Doug Supernaw (1)
- Billy Swan (1)
- Taylor Swift (10)
- Cole Swindell (2)
- Sylvia (2)

== T ==
- B.J. Thomas (3)
- Dick Thomas (1)
- Thompson Square (1)
- Hank Thompson (3)
- Cyndi Thomson (1)
- Mel Tillis (6)
- Pam Tillis (1)
- Floyd Tillman (1)
- Aaron Tippin (3)
- Mitchell Torok (1)
- Merle Travis (2)
- Randy Travis (16)
- Rick Trevino (1)
- Travis Tritt (5)
- Ernest Tubb (6)
- Tanya Tucker (10)
- Josh Turner (4)
- Mary Lou Turner (1)
- Wesley Tuttle and His Texas Stars (1)
- Shania Twain (7)
- Conway Twitty (40)

== U ==
- Uncle Kracker (1)
- Carrie Underwood (14)
- Keith Urban (15)

== V ==
- Leroy Van Dyke (1)
- Phil Vassar (2)

== W ==
- Porter Wagoner (3)
- The Wailers (1)
- Jimmy Wakely (3)
- Billy Walker (1)
- Clay Walker (6)
- Jerry Wallace (1)
- Morgan Wallen (12)
- Steve Wariner (10)
- Gene Watson (1)
- Jimmy Wayne (1)
- Lawrence Welk and His Orchestra (1)
- Kitty Wells (1)
- Dottie West (5)
- Shelly West (2)
- Bryan White (4)
- Margaret Whiting (1)
- Keith Whitley (5)
- Slim Willet with the Brush Cutters (1)
- Don Williams (17)
- Hank Williams (11)
- Hank Williams, Jr. (10)
- Bob Wills (6)
- Mark Wills (2)
- Gretchen Wilson (1)
- Lee Ann Womack (1)
- Sheb Wooley (1)
- Darryl Worley (3)
- The Wreckers (1)
- Chely Wright (1)
- Johnnie Wright (1)
- Tammy Wynette (20)

== Y ==
- Trisha Yearwood (5)
- Dwight Yoakam (2)
- Chris Young (5)
- Faron Young (5)

== Z ==
- Bailey Zimmerman (1)

== See also ==
- Hot Country Songs
