= Oklahoma Hills =

Song written by Woody and Jack Guthrie

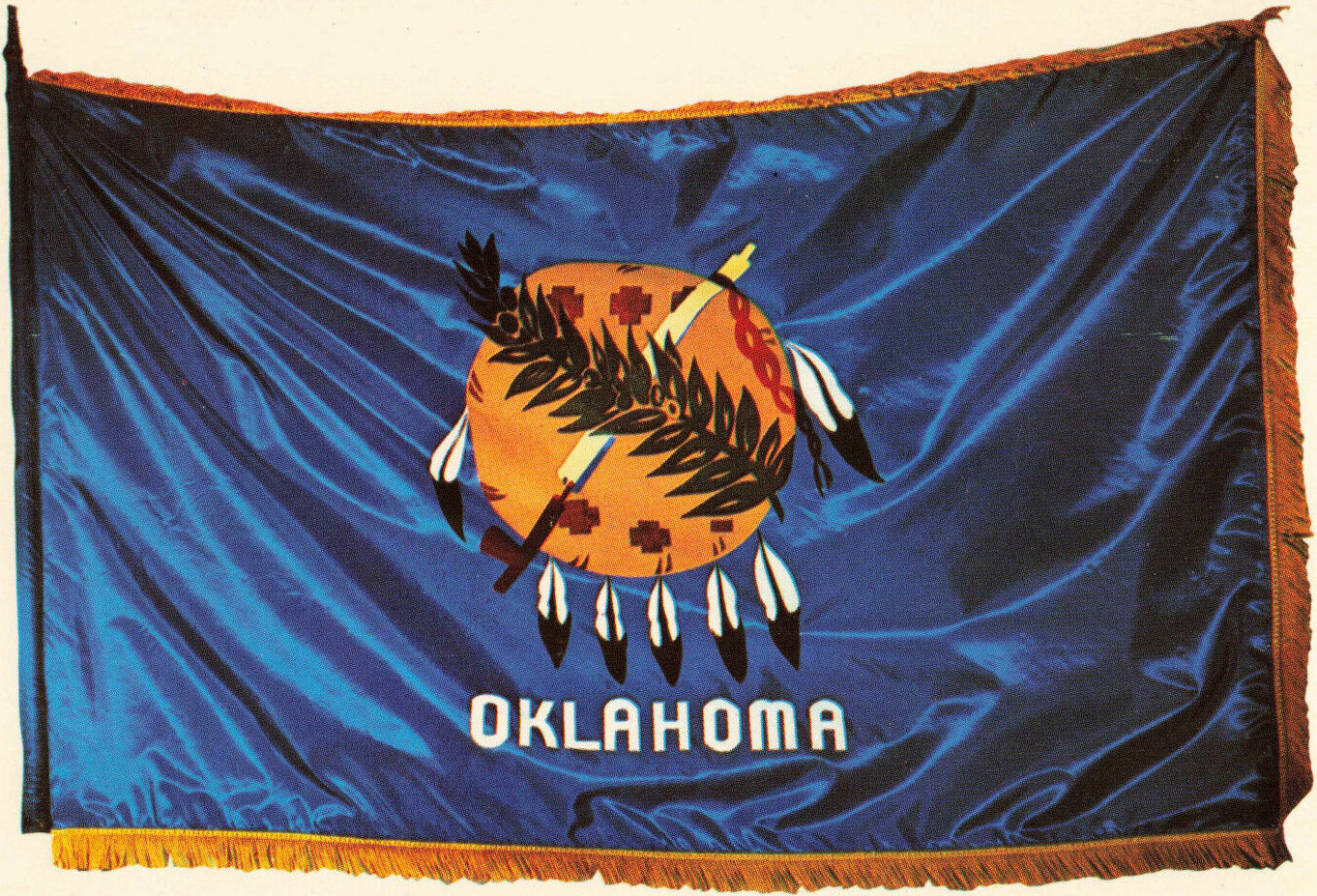
- Regional anthem of Oklahoma
- Lyrics: Woody Guthrie, 1945
- Music: Jack Guthrie, 1945
- Adopted: 2001; 25 years ago

"Oklahoma Hills" is a song written by Woody Guthrie. In 2001 it was named the official Folk Song of the state of Oklahoma.

== Chorus ==
Way down yonder in the Indian nation
I rode my pony on the reservation
In the Oklahoma Hills where I was born
Way down yonder in the Indian nation
A cowboy’s life is my occupation
In the Oklahoma Hills where I was born

== Jack Guthrie Recording ==
Jack Guthrie, Woody's cousin, changed the lyrics and music slightly and in 1945 recorded a Western swing version, which reached Number 1 on the Juke Box Folk Records charts. It remains the best-known version of "Oklahoma Hills", and was the biggest hit of Jack Guthrie's fairly short life. Though Woody originated the song, the official Woody Guthrie website credits both him and Jack as its writers, perhaps because Jack's changes have become so well known.

== Recordings ==
Recordings of "Oklahoma Hills" have been made by these singers, among others:

- Chet Atkins
- Floyd Cramer
- Gene Autry
- Johnny Bond
- Charlie Feathers
- Arlo Guthrie, Woody's son, recorded the song for his album Running Down the Road, released in 1969 by Warner Bros. Records.
- Jimmy Lafave
- Mary McCaslin
- Carl Smith
- Bruce Springsteen
- James Talley
- Country singer Hank Thompson, joined by His Brazos Valley Boys, recorded a well-known version of "Oklahoma Hills" in 1961. Thompson's Western swing rendition reached No. 7 on the Billboard magazine Hot C&W Singles chart.
- Ernest Tubb
- Jimmy Wakely
- Bob Wills and His Texas Playboys
- David Carradine, in the 1976 Bound for Glory movie and in its soundtrack album, Academy Award winner for Best Original Song Score and Its Adaptation or Adaptation Score.

== Accolades ==
Members of the Western Writers of America chose it as one of the Top 100 Western songs of all time. In 2001, the Oklahoma Legislature declared it to be the official state folk song.

Preceded by "At Mail Call Today" by Gene Autry	Most Played Juke Box Folk Records number one single by Jack Guthrie; July 28, 1945	Succeeded by "You Two-Timed Me One Time Too Often" by Tex Ritter
