= Honey, Do You Think I'm Wrong =

"Honey, Do You Think It's Wrong"

Single by Al Dexter and His Troopers
- B-side: "Guitar Polka"
- Published: January 29, 1946 Hill and range songs, inc. and Al Dexter music publishing co.
- Released: January 1946
- Recorded: March 21, 1942
- Studio: CBS Columbia Square Studio, Hollywood, California
- Genre: Country (Hillbilly), honky-tonk
- Label: Columbia 36898
- Songwriter(s): Al Dexter, Frankie Marvin

Al Dexter and His Troopers singles chronology
| "Triffin' Gal / I'm Lost Without You" (1945) | "Honey, Do You Think It's Wrong" (1946) | "Wine, Women, And Song" (1946) |

"Honey, Do You Think I'm Wrong" is a country music song written by Al Dexter and Frankie Marvin, performed by Al Dexter and His Troopers, and released on the Columbia label (catalog no. 36898). In February 1946, it reached No. 2 on the folk chart. It spent eight weeks on the charts and was ranked as the No. 12 record in Billboard's year-end folk juke box chart. It was the "B-side" to "Guitar Polka" which peaked at No. 1.

== See also ==
- Billboard Most-Played Folk Records of 1946
