= Spade Cooley's Western Swing Song Folio =

1945 songbook by Spade Cooley

- Folio cover.
- Author: Donnell C. "Spade" Cooley and Smokey Rogers
- Language: English
- Genre: Song book
- Publisher: Hill and Range Songs, Inc.
- Publication date: 1945
- Publication place: United States
- Media type: Folio

Spade Cooley's Western Swing Song Folio was the first songbook to identify the big Western dance band music as Western Swing. In October 1944, "Billboard made the following announcement, unceremoniously giving the subgenre its common label for the first time in a national publication: 'Spade Cooley will put out 25 of his original tunes, together with an album of band numbers and suggestions on arrangements for Western Bands. Book to be titled 'Western Swing'." All songs in the folio list both Spade Cooley and Smokey Rogers as co-writers.

Spade Cooley was one of the first song-writers signed by Jean and Julian Aberbach for their new music publishing house, Hill and Range Songs, Inc., the publishers of this folio.

== Sheet music ==
Sheet music in the folio are:

- "Oklahoma Gal"
- "Jive on the Range"
- "There is No Sunshine"
- "Heavenly Range"
- "Gitar Swing"
- "You're Gonna Pay"
- "Now and Always"
- "My Chickashay Gal"
- "Do Ya or Don'tcha"
- "Shawnee Blues"
- "Tennessee Wagner"
- "You Gotta Quit Your Triflin'"
- "I'm Waiting for the Day (That You Come Back)"
- "Gonna Leave You Blues"
- "You're Breakin' This Poor Heart of Mine"

== Bibliography ==
- Cooley, Donnell C. "Spade". Spade Cooley's Western Swing Song Folio. Beverly Hills, Calif: Hill and Range Songs (1945).
- Lange, Jeffrey J.Smile When You Call Me a Hillbilly: Country Music's Struggle for Respectability, 1939-1954. Athens, GA: University of Georgia Press (2004).
