= It's Up to You (Al Dexter song) =

Single by Al Dexter
- B-side: "Wine, Women And Song"
- Released: August 1946
- Recorded: March 18, 1942
- Genre: Country
- Label: Columbia
- Songwriter(s): Al Dexter, James B. Paris

"It's Up to You" is a country music song written by Al Dexter and James B. Paris, sung by Dexter, and released in 1946 on the Columbia label (catalog no. 37062). In September 1946, it reached No. 3 on the Billboard most-played folk chart. It was also ranked as the No. 30 record on the Billboard 1946 year-end folk record sellers chart.

== See also ==
- Billboard Most-Played Folk Records of 1946
