= Ida Red =

Traditional song

Single by Bob Wills and His Texas Playboys
- B-side: "Carolina In The Morning"
- Released: September 1939
- Recorded: November 29, 1938
- Studio: Dallas, Texas
- Genre: Western swing
- Label: Vocalion 05079
- Songwriter: Traditional

Bob Wills and His Texas Playboys singles chronology
"Beaumont Rag" (1939)	"Ida Red" (1939)	"My Window Faces The South" (1939)

"Ida Red" (Roud 3429) is an American traditional song of unknown origin, made famous in the upbeat 1938 version by Bob Wills and his Texas Playboys, the primary inspiration for Chuck Berry's first big hit "Maybellene." It is chiefly identified by variations of the chorus:

Ida Red, Ida Red, I'm a plumb fool 'bout Ida Red.

Verses are unrelated, humorous and free form, changing from performance to performance, usually referring to a female character. The earliest recording is one by Fiddlin' Powers & Family (Victor 19434, 1924), which includes vocals. There is also an early well-known instrumental by Dykes Magic City Trio (Brunswick 125, 1927). Like his father and grandfather, Wills, renowned in parts of Texas for his fiddling before he formed the Texas Playboys, learned this tune in his earliest days of practice.

"Ida Red", the personage, appears in a number of distantly related songs. One, by Charlie Poole and the North Carolina Ramblers whose "Shootin' Creek" (Columbia 15286-D, 1928), a version of "Cripple Creek", contains verses from "Ida Red", i.e.:

Ida Red, she's a darned ol' fool,
Tried to put a saddle on a hump-back mule.

Alan Lomax includes another in his collection of "Negro Bad Men" songs titled "Ida Red". Other than the title, this song is in no way related to the folk song. This song is of a criminal feeling sorry for himself. In every verse he wails to his woman:

Oh, weep! Oh, my Ida!

Several songs use the same tune behind unrelated subject matter. These include "Down The Road" and "Over The Road I'm Bound to Go".

== Western swing ==
"Sunday Night", by F.W. Root, 1878, provided some of the lyrics for the Bob Wills version of "Ida Red".

In the 1930s, Bob Wills took the old tune and set it to a 2/4 dance beat to be played by his Western swing dance band, the Texas Playboys. His 1938 recording (Vocalion 05079) became a hit. It borrows lyrics from an 1878 song written by Frederick W. Root ("Sunday Night"), and opens with:

Light's in the parlor, fire's in the grate,
Clock on the mantle says it's a'gettin' late,
Curtains on the window, snowy white,
The parlor's pleasant on Sunday night.

"Sunday Night" opens with:

The light is in the parlor, A fire is in the grate;
The clock upon the mantle Ticks out "it's getting late"
The curtains at the windows Are made of snowy white,
The parlor is a pleasant place To sit on Sunday night, To sit on Sunday, Sunday night.

Wills and his Texas Playboys performed this arrangement of "Ida Red" in two of his movies; 'Go West, Young Lady (1941) and Blazing the Western Trail (1945). It has been revived by the award-winning Western Swing band The Hot Club of Cowtown and features on four of their albums: Swingin' Stampede (1998), Continental Stomp (2003; live version), Four Dead Batteries (film soundtrack, 2005), and Best Of The Hot Club of Cowtown (2008).

=== "Ida Red Likes the Boogie" ===
In 1949, Bob Wills and His Texas Playboys brought out a boogie woogie version of "Ida Red" called "Ida Red Likes The Boogie" (MGM K10570). In 1950, it spent 22 weeks on the charts, reaching #10. "Ida Red Likes The Boogie" has been recorded by other artists numerous times since.

=== "Maybellene" ===
In 1955, Chuck Berry's "Maybellene", adapted parts of "Ida Red" as recorded by Bob Wills in 1938 and is believed to be one of the first rock & roll songs ever recorded, reached #10 on the pop charts and #1 on the R&B charts. As a result, Bob Wills was later posthumously inducted into the Rock & Roll Hall of Fame as an early influence to rock & roll.

== Bluegrass and country ==
Bluegrass and country versions, as performed by Bill Monroe and Roy Acuff, use the traditional humorous free floating verses, but in 4/4 time instead of following the easy-going Appalachian tempo.

A version was recorded by Asleep At The Wheel on their two-time Grammy Award-winning 1993 Bob Wills tribute album.

== Bibliography ==
- Laird, Ross. Brunswick Records: A Discography of Recordings, 1916-1931. Greenwood Press, 2001. ISBN 0-313-31867-0
- Lomax, John A. and Alan Lomax. American Ballads and Folk Songs. Dover Publications (reprint), 1994. ISBN 0-486-28276-7
- Pegg, Bruce. Brown Eyed Handsome Man: The Life And Hard Times Of Chuck Berry. Routledge, 2005. ISBN 0-415-93751-5
- Root, Frederic Woodman. "Sunday Night". Root & Sons Music Co., 1879. (Sheet music from Library of Congress)
- Whitburn, Joel. The Billboard Book of Top 40 Country Hits. Billboard Books, 2006. ISBN 0-8230-8291-1
