= Stars and Stripes on Iwo Jima =

"Stars And Stripes On Iwo Jima"

Single by Bob Wills and His Texas Playboys
- B-side: "You Don't Care What Happens to Me"
- Released: May 1945
- Recorded: April 20, 1945
- Studio: CBS, Hollywood, California
- Genre: Western swing
- Label: Okeh
- Songwriter(s): Bob Wills, Cliff Johnsen

Bob Wills and His Texas Playboys singles chronology
"Smoke on the Water" (1945)	"Stars And Stripes On Iwo Jima" (1945)	"Silver Dew on the Blue Grass Tonight" (1945)

"Stars and Stripes on Iwo Jima" is a 1945 song by Bob Wills and His Texas Playboys. The song was Bob Wills' second number one on the Juke Box Folk charts, spending a single week at number one and a total of eleven weeks on the chart. The B-side of "Stars and Stripes on Iwo Jima", a song entitled, "You Don't Care What Happens To Me" peaked at number five on the same chart.

Later in 1945, Sons of the Pioneers, peaked at number four on the Juke Box Folk Record chart with their version.
