= Steel Guitar Rag =

1936 instrumental performed by Bob Wills

Single by Bob Wills and his Texas Playboys
- B-side: "Swing Blues No. 1"
- Released: December 1936
- Recorded: September 30, 1936
- Studio: Furniture Mart Building, Chicago, Illinois
- Genre: Western swing
- Label: Vocalion; 03394
- Songwriter: Leon McAuliffe

Bob Wills and his Texas Playboys singles chronology
"Basin Street Blues" (1936)	"Steel Guitar Rag" (1936)	"What's The Matter With The Mill" (1937)

"Steel Guitar Rag" is a Western swing instrumental composed by Leon McAuliffe, and first recorded by Bob Wills and his Texas Playboys, of which McAuliffe was a member, in 1936. It is also credited with popularizing the steel guitar itself as an instrument.

The song has been noted for its similarities to "Guitar Rag", recorded by guitarist Sylvester Weaver in 1927, although others have claimed stylistic similarities to a popular Hawaiian song, "On the Beach at Waikiki", which was widely performed on the vaudeville circuits in the U.S. Many musicians and groups have performed versions of the song, such as the Buckaroos, Ike Turner, Doc Watson, and John Fahey.

== Bibliography ==
- Dempsey. John Mark. The Light Crust Doughboys Are on the Air: Celebrating Seventy Years of Texas Music. University of North Texas Press; Har/Com edition (September 2002) ISBN 1-57441-151-9
- Harrington, Joe S. Sonic Cool: The Life & Death of Rock 'n' Roll. Hal Leonard, 2002. ISBN 0-634-02861-8
- Komara, Edward. Encyclopedia of the Blues. Routledge, 2005) ISBN 0-415-92699-8
- Koskoff, Ellen. Music Cultures in the United States: An Introduction. Routledge, 2005. ISBN 0-415-96588-8
- Lange, Jeffrey J. Smile When You Call Me a Hillbilly: Country Music's Struggle for Respectability, 1939-1954. University of Georgia Press (August 2004) ISBN 0-8203-2623-2
- Oliphant, Dave. "Texas Jazz: 1920-50". The Roots of Texas Music edited by Lawrence Clayton, Joe W. Specht, pp. 37–65. Texas A&M University Press, 2005. ISBN 1-58544-492-8
- Ruymar, Lorene. The Hawaiian Steel Guitar and Its Great Hawaiian Musicians. Centerstream Publications, 1996. ISBN 1-57424-021-8
- Santoro, Gene. Stir It Up: Musical Mixes from Roots to Jazz. Oxford University Press, 1997. ISBN 0-19-509869-2
- Stambler, Irwin; Grelun Land. Country Music: The Encyclopedia. St. Martin's Griffin, 2000. ISBN 0-312-26487-9
- Townsend, Charles. San Antonio Rose: The Life and Music of Bob wills. University of Illinois Press, 1986. ISBN 0-252-01362-X
