= With Tears in My Eyes =

Single by Hank Williams
- A-side: "Leave Me Alone with the Blues"
- Released: 1957
- Recorded: 1948 or 1949 (Unconfirmed)
- Genre: Country
- Length: 2:18
- Label: MGM
- Songwriter(s): Paul Howard

"With Tears in My Eyes" is a 1945 song by Wesley Tuttle and His Texas Stars. The song was Wesley Tuttle's first and most successful entry on the Juke Box Folk Chart. "With Tears in My Eyes" went number one for four weeks with a total of fourteen weeks on the chart. The Paul Howard composition was also released as a posthumous Hank Williams single on MGM Records in 1957. The late singer had recorded it in Shreveport in 1948 or 1949 as a demo or as part of a radio show at KWKH studio
