= Shame on You (Cooley song) =

Single by Spade Cooley and His Western Band
- B-side: "A Pair of Broken Hearts"
- Released: January 15, 1945
- Genre: Western swing
- Label: OKeh
- Songwriter(s): Spade Cooley

"Shame on You" is a Western Swing song written by Spade Cooley and became his signature song.

== Background ==
The title comes from the refrain that starts each verse:

Shame, shame on you.
Shame, shame on you.

In the song, the singer is rebuking his straying girlfriend. The recording was Cooley's first after taking over the band from Jimmy Wakely, and the first of an unbroken chain of six hits which led to him being on the cover of Billboard in March 1946. "Shame On You" was the first song whose rights were owned by the Hill & Range publishing company, which later grew to become a dominant force in country music.

== Chart performance ==
First recorded by Spade Cooley, it was released January 15, 1945 (OKeh 6731). With vocals by Tex Williams, it reached number one, spending 31 weeks on the charts. The "B" side, "A Pair of Broken Hearts"—also a hit—reached number eight.

== Cover Versions ==
- Later in 1945, "Shame on You" was recorded as a foxtrot by The Lawrence Welk Orchestra with Red Foley. Their version also went to number one on the country charts. The B-side of the song, entitled, "At Mail Call Today", went to number three on the country charts. Coast Records, based in Los Angeles released a version by Walt Shrum and His Colorado Hillbillies.
- "Shame on You" has also been recorded by several other Western swing bands.

== Bibliography ==
- Komorowski, Adam. Spade Cooley: Swingin' The Devil's Dream. (Proper PVCD 127, 2003) booklet.
- Lange, Jeffrey J.Smile When You Call Me a Hillbilly: Country Music's Struggle for Respectability, 1939-1954. ISBN 0-8203-2623-2
