= White Cross on Okinawa =

Single by Bob Wills and His Texas Playboys
- B-side: "Empty Chair at the Christmas Table"
- Released: November 12, 1945
- Recorded: October 3, 1945
- Studio: CBS, Hollywood, California
- Genre: Western swing
- Label: Columbia
- Songwriter(s): Bob Wills, Cliff Johnsen, Cliff Sundin

Bob Wills and His Texas Playboys singles chronology
"Silver Dew on the Blue Grass Tonight" (1945)	"White Cross on Okinawa" (1945)	"New Spanish Two Step" (1946)

"White Cross on Okinawa" is 1945 song by Bob Wills and His Texas Playboys. The song was Bob Wills' fourth number one on the Juke Box Folk chart where it spent a single week at the top and a total of five weeks on the chart.
