= You Will Have to Pay =

1945 song by Sarah Jane Cooper, Bonnie Dodd, Tex Ritter

Single by Tex Ritter
- B-side: "Christmas Carols by the Old Corral"
- Released: November 24, 1945
- Recorded: September 27, 1944
- Genre: Country
- Length: 2:54
- Label: Capitol 223
- Songwriter(s): Sarah Jane Cooper; Bonnie Dodd; Tex Ritter

Tex Ritter singles chronology
"You Two-Timed Me One Time Too Often" (1945)	"You Will Have to Pay" (1945)	"I'm Gonna Leave You Like I Found You" (1946)

"You Will Have to Pay" is a 1945 song by Tex Ritter. "You Will Have To Pay" was Tex Ritter's final number one on Juke Box Folk chart, remaining at the top of the chart for three weeks. The B-side of the song, "Christmas Carols By the Old Corral", hit number two on the same chart.
