= Guitar Polka =

Single by Al Dexter and His Troopers
- B-side: "Honey, Do You Think It's Wrong"
- Published: April 22, 1946 Vogue Music Corp.
- Released: January 1946
- Recorded: March 21, 1942
- Studio: CBS Columbia Square Studio, Hollywood, California
- Genre: Country (Hillbilly), honky-tonk
- Label: Columbia 36898
- Composer(s): Al Dexter
- Lyricist(s): James B. Paris

Al Dexter and His Troopers singles chronology
| "Triffin' Gal / I'm Lost Without You" (1945) | "Guitar Polka" (1946) | "Wine, Women, And Song" (1946) |

"Guitar Polka" is a 1946 instrumental song by Al Dexter and His Troopers. "Guitar Polka" spent sixteen weeks at number one on the Juke Box Folk charts and a total of twenty-nine weeks on the chart.

The B-side of the song entitled, "Honey Do You Think It's Wrong" peaked at number two, on the same chart.
