= Wine Women and Song =

"Wine, Women, And Song"

Single by Al Dexter and His Troopers
- B-side: "It's Up To You"
- Published: copyright September 16, 1940 Albert Poindexter & Aubrey Gass, Troup, Texas
- Released: July 29, 1946
- Recorded: April 5, 1945
- Studio: CBS Columbia Square Studio, Hollywood, California
- Genre: Country (Hillbilly)
- Label: Columbia 37062
- Songwriter(s): Albert Poindexter & Aubrey Gass

Al Dexter and His Troopers singles chronology
"Guitar Polka / Honey, Do You Think It's Wrong" (1946)	"Wine, Women, And Song" (1946)	"Kokomo Island" (1947)

"Wine Women And Song" is a 1940 song written by Al Dexter and Aubrey Gass. It was recorded on April 23, 1940 at Burrus Sawmill Studio, Saginaw, Texas by Al Dexter & His Troopers (consisting of Dexter, Gass and bass player Joe Ferguson). It was released June 6, 1940 on Vocalion 05572 with no success. After hits like "Pistol Packin' Mama", Dexter re-recorded it on April 5, 1945 at the CBS Studio at Radio Station KNX, Sunset Blvd., Hollywood, California. It was released on August 15, 1946 on Columbia 37062, backed with "It's Up To You". On September 14, 1946, it reached the no. 1 spot on Billboard's "Most Played Jukebox Folk Records" chart, where it remained for five weeks.
