= You Two-Timed Me One Time Too Often =

1945 song by Jenny Lou Carson

Single by Tex Ritter and His Texans
- B-side: "Green Grow the Lilacs"
- Published: July 17, 1945 by Acuff-Rose Publications, Inc., Nashville
- Released: July 25, 1945
- Recorded: May 1, 1945
- Genre: Country
- Length: 2:40
- Label: Capitol 206
- Songwriter: Jenny Lou Carson

Tex Ritter and His Texans singles chronology
"Jealous Heart" (1945)	"You Two-Timed Me One Time Too Often" (1945)	"You Will Have to Pay" (1945)

"You Two-Timed Me One Time Too Often" written in 1945 by Jenny Lou Carson and performed by Tex Ritter, was the first number one country music hit written by a woman.

== Chart performance ==
It was Ritter's second number one on the Juke Box Folk chart, spending eleven weeks at the top and a total of twenty weeks on the chart.

== Cover Versions ==
It was subsequently recorded by: the Hoosier Hot Shots, Helen O'Connell, Sue Thompson, Wesley Tuttle, Doc Watson, and Red Foley, amongst others.
