= New Spanish Two Step =

Single by Bob Wills and His Texas Playboys
- B-side: "Roly Poly"
- Released: April 1946
- Recorded: April 25, 1945
- Studio: CBS Studio at Radio Station KNX, Hollywood, California
- Genre: Western swing
- Label: Columbia; 36966
- Songwriters: Bob Wills, Tommy Duncan

Bob Wills and His Texas Playboys singles chronology
"White Cross on Okinawa" (1945)	"New Spanish Two Step" (1946)	"Stay A Little Longer" (1946)

"New Spanish Two Step" is a Western swing standard based on a traditional fiddle tune, "Spanish Two Step". Bob Wills and His Texas Playboys recorded the latter on September 23, 1935, and released it on Vocalion 03230 in 1936. Ten years later, Wills and Tommy Duncan added lyrics and recorded it again on April 25, 1945, releasing it on Columbia 36966 in April 1946 as "New Spanish Two Step". It stayed on the charts for 23 weeks, reaching number one on the Folk-Jukebox chart for 16 weeks. Both versions were one of the band's signature songs.

Wills and his vocalist, Tommy Duncan, added lyrics to reflect the title:

I told her I had to go,
Left her down in Mexico,
The band played 'Spanish Two-Step' soft and low.

The "b" side, "Roly Poly", was also a big hit, reaching number three.

== See also ==
- Billboard Most-Played Folk Records of 1946

== Bibliography ==
- McWhorter, Frankie. Cowboy Fiddler in Bob Wills' Band. University of North Texas Press, 1997. ISBN 1-57441-025-3
