= Spade Cooley =

American singer-songwriter and convicted murderer (1910–1969)

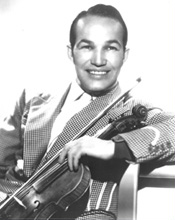
- Cooley in 1944
- Born: Donnell Clyde Cooley; December 17, 1910; Grand, Oklahoma, U.S.
- Died: November 23, 1969 (aged 58); Oakland, California, U.S.
- Other name: King of Western Swing
- Status: Paroled - died before grant of parole enacted
- Conviction: First degree murder
- Penalty: Life imprisonment

Details
- Victims: Ella Mae Cooley (née Evans)
- Date: April 3, 1961
- Musical career
- Genre: Western swing
- Occupations: Big-band leader, actor, television personality
- Instruments: Fiddle, vocals
- Years active: c. 1940–1961; November 23, 1969 (half-show)
- Labels: Westernair, Columbia, RCA, Decca, OKeh

Donnell Clyde "Spade" Cooley (December 17, 1910 – November 23, 1969) was an American Western swing musician, big-band leader, actor, television personality, and convicted murderer. In 1961, he was convicted of the murder of his second wife, Ella Mae Evans. He became known for leading the Spade Cooley Orchestra, which was associated with the Western swing music scene in California.

== Early life ==
Donnell Clyde Cooley was born in Grand, Oklahoma. Being part Cherokee, he was sent to the Chemawa Indian School in Salem, Oregon, in his youth. In 1930, during the Dust Bowl, Cooley's family moved to California. There, he took the nickname "Spade" after he played a poker game and won three straight flush hands, all in spades.

== Music career ==
Cooley joined a big band led by Jimmy Wakely, who played at the Venice Pier Ballroom in Venice, California, playing fiddle. Several thousand dancers would turn out on Saturday nights to swing and hop: "The hordes (sic) of people and jitterbuggers loved [Cooley]." When Wakely got a movie contract at Universal Pictures, Cooley replaced him as bandleader. To capitalize on the pioneering success of the Bob Wills–Tommy Duncan pairing, Cooley hired vocalist Tex Williams, who was capable of the mellow, deep baritone sound made popular by Duncan. Cooley's 18-month engagement at the Venice Pier Ballroom was record-breaking for the early half of the 1940s.

Cooley was in a so-called "battle of the bands" in July 1942, with Bob Wills and His Texas Playboys at the Venice Pier Ballroom. Afterward, Cooley claimed he won and began to promote himself as the King of Western Swing. Despite Bob Wills playing the style of music before Cooley, the first documented use of "Western swing" for this style of music was in 1942 by Cooley's promoter at the time, Forman Phillips.

Cooley wrote and recorded "Shame on You", released by Okeh Records; recorded in December 1944, it was number one on the country charts for two months, while covers of the song by Red Foley with Lawrence Welk, and by Bill Boyd, opened at numbers three and four, respectively, on Billboard's Most Played Juke Box Folk Records chart (the chart which evolved into today's Hot Country chart) for 30 August 1945. Soundies Distributing Corp. of America issued one of their "music video-like" film shorts of Cooley's band performing "Shame on You" in the fall of 1945. "Shame on You" was the first in an unbroken string of six top-10 singles, including "Detour" and "You Can't Break My Heart".

Spade Cooley hung around Republic Pictures, ultimately sneaking onto a Gene Autry set. He was caught, but Autry noticed his resemblance to cowboy actor Roy Rogers and his talent for playing the fiddle, and introduced him to Rogers. Cooley appeared in 38 Western films, both in bit parts and as a stand-in and stuntman for Rogers. In 1936, Rogers made Cooley the featured fiddle player and a vocalist in his group Riders of the Purple Sage. Billed as Spade Cooley and His Western Dance Gang, he was featured in the soundie Take Me Back To Tulsa released July 31, 1944, along with Williams and Carolina Cotton. Corrine, Corrina was released August 28, 1944, minus Cotton. The film short Spade Cooley: King of Western Swing was filmed in May 1945 and released September 1, 1945. It was followed by Melody Stampede released on November 8, 1945. Spade Cooley & His Orchestra came out in 1949. In 1950, Cooley had significant roles in several films.

In the summer of 1946, the Cooley band fragmented after the bandleader fired Williams, who had offers to record on his own. A number of key sidemen, including guitarist Johnny Weis, left with Williams, who formed the Western Caravan, which incorporated a sound similar to Cooley's. Williams had his hit recording of "Smoke! Smoke! Smoke! (That Cigarette)" in 1947. Cooley reconstituted his band with former Bob Wills sidemen, including steel guitarist Noel Boggs and the guitar ensemble of Jimmy Wyble and Cameron Hill. He also added full brass and reed sections to the band.

Beginning in June 1948, Cooley began hosting The Spade Cooley Show, a variety show on KTLA-TV in Los Angeles, broadcast from the Santa Monica Ballroom on the pier. The show won local Emmy Awards in 1952 and 1953. Guests included Frankie Laine, Frank Sinatra, and Dinah Shore. The Spade Cooley Show was viewed coast-to-coast via the Paramount Television Network. KTLA eventually cancelled Cooley's program by 1956 and replaced it with a competing show brought over from KCOP, Cliffie Stone's Hometown Jamboree.

In 1960, Cooley announced his retirement from music and moved to his ranch in Mojave, to spend more time with his family. He was honored by the installation of a star on the Hollywood Walk of Fame. The foundation was laid on February 8, 1960.

== Personal life ==
=== Murder of Ella Mae Evans ===
Cooley's second wife, Ella Mae Cooley (née Evans), had been a singer in his band before they married in 1945; he was 34, and she was 21. During their marriage, Cooley suspected her of repeatedly being unfaithful. Conversely, Ella Mae suspected Cooley of infidelity. In 1946, Ella Mae was certain of Spade's infidelity and began packing to leave. Cooley told his wife that if she ever did leave him, he would find her and kill her.

After his retirement from music in 1960, Cooley's drinking became more of a problem, and he was also mixing alcohol with thorazine. In February 1961, Ella Mae was hospitalized for a nervous breakdown. While there, she told nurses that the abuse from Cooley had escalated and that he had repeatedly threatened to murder her and their children.

In March 1961, she told a friend she had had an affair with Roy Rogers in 1952 or 1953. She soon asked Cooley – who had had many of his own affairs – for a divorce. On March 23, he filed for divorce, citing "incompatibility", and seeking custody of their three children, Melody, Donnell, Jr., and John.

On April 3, Cooley murdered his wife at the couple's home near Willow Springs. Cooley's then-14-year-old daughter, Melody, recounted to the jury how she was forced by her father to watch in terror as he beat her mother's head against the floor, stomped on her stomach, then crushed a lit cigarette against her skin to see whether she was dead. Cooley claimed his wife had been injured by falling in the shower.

On April 26, 1961, Cooley was indicted by a Kern County grand jury for the murder. Cooley was defended by attorney P. Basil Lambros, in what was the longest case in county history at the time and was convicted of first-degree murder by a Kern County jury on August 21, 1961, after unexpectedly withdrawing an insanity plea. Facing a possible death sentence, Cooley was sentenced to life in prison, eligible for parole after serving seven years, after the jury recommended mercy.

Cooley had a parole hearing after serving eight years, in August 1969. His friends in Hollywood had been lobbying Governor Ronald Reagan, who threw his support behind Cooley being released on parole. The state review board voted to grant Cooley a release on parole, effective February 1970. Cooley died before his parole took effect.

Cooley had been awarded a Star on the Hollywood Walk of Fame before the murder conviction, which has not been removed.

== Death ==
On August 5, 1969, the California State Adult Authority voted unanimously to parole Cooley on February 22, 1970. He had served less than eight years of a life sentence and was in poor health from heart trouble.

On November 23, 1969, he received a 72-hour furlough from the prison hospital unit at Vacaville to play a benefit concert for the Deputy Sheriffs Association of Alameda County at the Oakland Auditorium (now known as the Henry J. Kaiser Convention Center) in Oakland. During the intermission, after a standing ovation, Cooley suffered a fatal heart attack backstage. He is interred at Chapel of the Chimes cemetery in Hayward.

== In popular culture ==
John Gilmore wrote an in-depth portrait of Cooley's life and death in Shame on You, a segment of Gilmore's 2005 book L.A. Despair: A Landscape of Crimes and Bad Times.

Cooley is a recurring character in James Ellroy's fiction, including in the story "Dick Contino's Blues", which appeared in issue number 46 of Granta (Winter 1994), and was anthologized in Hollywood Nocturnes. Ellroy also features a fictionalized version of Cooley in his 1990 novel L.A. Confidential.

Country historian Rich Kienzle, who specializes in the history of West Coast country music and Western swing, profiled Cooley in his 2003 book Southwest Shuffle.

He is referenced in one of The Honeymooners episodes, "My Aching Back" (1956) (from Art "Ed Norton" Carney to Jackie "Ralph Kramden" Gleason): "They wouldn't-a won [the National Raccoon Mambo Championship] except some guy slipped in a Spade Cooley record".

In the 1956 episode "Rochester Falls Asleep, Misses Program" (The Jack Benny Program), Benny talks about how he is not afraid to play his violin in front of an audience, saying to Mary Livingstone, "I'm certainly no Heifetz, or Isaac Stern, or Mischa Elman." Guest-star Bob Crosby then jokes, "You can throw Spade Cooley in there too."

The Longmire novel Junkyard Dogs, by Craig Johnson, has Walt Longmire and Deputy Vic entering a truck stop that Vic refers to as "the Disneyland Redneck Ride". Music playing when they enter is "scratching the paint off the inside of the place". Vic: "What the hell is that?" Walt: "That'd be 'Three Way Boogie', Spade Cooley" He then gives the salacious bits of the above history.

Ry Cooder's 2008 album I, Flathead features a reference to Cooley on the track "Steel Guitar Heaven" ("There ain't no bosses up in heaven / I heard Spade Cooley didn't make the grade"), as well as a track named "Spayed Kooley", the name of the singer's dog.

In 2015, the Ella Mae Evans murder was profiled in the episode "Fame and Misfortune" of the Investigation Discovery series Tabloid.

In 2017, Tyler Mahan Coe's podcast Cocaine & Rhinestones profiles Spade Cooley in the third episode of season one.

In 2018, Jake Brennan's podcast Disgraceland profiled Spade Cooley in the 12th episode of the season.

In September 2023, Winnipeg musician Boy Golden released a single titled "The King of Western Swing" covering Spade's story and crime.

== Discography ==
- Sagebrush Swing (Columbia H-9 [four-disc 78 rpm album set], HL-9007 [10" LP], 1949)
- Square Dances (RCA Victor P-249 [three-disc 78 rpm album set], 1949)
- Roy Rogers and Spade Cooley: Skip to My Lou and Other Square Dances (RCA Victor P-259 [three-disc 78 rpm album set], 1949)
- Spade Cooley Plays Billy Hill for Dancing (RCA Victor P-275 [three-disc 78 rpm album set], 1950)
- Spade Cooley and His Square Dance Six: Square Dance Jamboree (Decca 1-245/1-246/1-247/1-248 [four-disc 78 rpm/45 rpm album set], 1953)
- Spade Cooley and His Buckle-Busters: Country and Western Dance-O-Rama, No. 3 (Decca DL-5563 [10" LP], 1955)
- Fidoodlin' (Ray Note RN-5007, 1959; reissue: Roulette SR-25145, 1961; CD reissue: Collectors' Choice Music CCM-431, 2004)
- The Best of The Spade Cooley Transcribed Shows (The Club of Spade 00101, 1978)
- The King of Western Swing (The Club of Spade 00102, 1978)
- The King of Western Music (The Club of Spade 00103, 1978)
- Mr. Music Himself, Volume One (The Club of Spade 00104, 1978)
- Mr. Music Himself, Volume Two (The Club of Spade 00105, 1978)
- Mr. Music Himself, Volume Three (The Club of Spade 00106, 1978)
- Spade Cooley and Tex Williams: As They Were (The Club of Spade CS-208, 1981)
- Spade Cooley and Tex Williams: Oklahoma Stomp (The Club of Spade CS-209, 1981)
- Spade Cooley: Columbia Historic Edition (Columbia FC-37467, 1982)
- Swinging the Devil's Dream (Charly CR-30239, 1985)
- Spadella! The Essential Spade Cooley (Columbia/Legacy CK-57392, 1994)
- King of Western Swing (Collectors' Choice Music CCM-039, 1997)
- Swingin' the Devil's Dream (Proper PVCD-127 [2CD], 2003)
- Shame On You: Singles Collection 1945–1952 (Jasmine JASMCD-3704, 2019)
- The Spade Cooley Collection 1945–1952 (Acrobat ADDCD-3308 [2CD], 2019)

Selected Singles Discography
Date	Title	Label
1942	"Tell Me Why" [Cal Shrum]	Westernair 801
05/03/46	"Oklahoma Stomp"	Columbia 37237
05/03/46	"Steel Guitar Rag"	Columbia 38054
06/06/46	"Spadella"	Columbia 37585
06/06/46	"Swingin' the Devil's Dream"	Columbia 20571
01/31/47	"Minuet in Swing"	RCA 20-2181
04/25/47	"All Aboard for Oklahoma"	RCA 20-2552
05/09/47	"You Can't Take Texas out of Me"	RCA 20-3547
11/17/47	"Spanish Fandango"	RCA 20-2668
03/30/49	"Arizona Waltz"	RCA 20-3496
04/11/50	"Hillbilly Fever"	RCA 21-0330
03/09/51	"Chew Tobacco Rag"	Decca 46310
05/29/52	"Carmen's Boogie"	Decca 28344

Top 40 Hits
Year	Position	Title	Label
1945	1	"Shame On You"	OKeh 6731
1945	8	"A Pair of Broken Hearts"	"
1945	4	"I've Taken All I'm Gonna Take from You"	OKeh 6746
1946	2	"Detour"	Columbia 36935
1946	3	"You Can't Break My Heart"	"
1947	4	"Crazy 'Cause I Love You"	Columbia 37058

== See also ==
- Aragon Ballroom (Ocean Park)
- Spade Cooley's Western Swing Song Folio
