= It's Been So Long Darling =

"It's Been So Long, Darling" is a 1945 song by Ernest Tubb. "It's Been So Long, Darling" was Ernest Tubb's seventh chart entry on the country charts and his second to make it to number one, where it stayed for four weeks and a total of thirteen weeks on the chart.

== Covers ==
- 1952 – Don Cherry, single
- 1957 – Hank Snow on the album Country and Western Jamboree
- 1961 – George Jones on Sings Country and Western Hits
- 1963 – Bill Anderson on the album Still
- 1963 – Glen Campbell on Too Late to Worry – Too Blue to Cry
- 1966 – Loretta Lynn on I Like 'Em Country, which charted at #2 on the country charts
- 1980 – Merle Haggard on The Way I Am
