= Smoke on the Water (Red Foley song) =

1943 song by Earl Nunn and Zeke Clements

Single by Red Foley
- B-side: "There's a Blue Star Shining Bright (In a Window Tonight)"
- Published: May 10, 1943 by Adams, Vee and Abbott, Inc., Chicago.
- Released: June 13, 1944
- Recorded: May 4, 1944
- Studio: Decca Recording, New York City
- Label: Decca
- Songwriter(s): Earl Nunn and Zeke Clements

Smoke on the Water
Song recorded by Red Foley 1944

"Smoke on the Water" is a song written by Zeke Clements and Earl Nunn and recorded by Red Foley in 1944. The patriotic song, which forecasts destruction for the Axis powers, particularly Japan, was Foley's first song to reach No. 1 on the Most-Played Juke Box Folk Records chart, spending 13 weeks at the top and a total of 24 weeks on the chart. "Smoke on the Water" also peaked at No. 7 on the Most-Played Juke Box Records chart. The B-side, "There's a Blue Star Shining Bright (In a Window Tonight)", peaked at No. 5 on the Most-Played Juke Box Folk Records chart.

In 1945, Bob Wills and His Texas Playboys recorded the song, which also became a No. 1 song on the Most-Played Juke Box Folk Records chart. The B-side, a song entitled, "Hang Your Head in Shame" peaked at No. 3.
