= Silver Dew on the Blue Grass Tonight =

Single by Bob Wills and His Texas Playboys
- B-side: "Texas Playboy Rag"
- Released: October 1, 1945
- Recorded: April 20, 1945
- Studio: CBS Studio at Radio Station KNX, Hollywood, California
- Genre: Western swing
- Label: Columbia 36841
- Songwriter(s): Ed Burt

Bob Wills and His Texas Playboys singles chronology
"Stars and Stripes on Iwo Jima" (1945)	"Silver Dew on the Blue Grass Tonight" (1945)	"White Cross on Okinawa" (1945)

"Silver Dew on the Blue Grass Tonight" is a 1945 song by Bob Wills. It was Bob Wills' third #1 song on the Juke Box Folk Record chart, where it spent 14 weeks, three of them in the top position. It was the B-side of the instrumental "Texas Playboy Rag", which peaked at #2 on the chart.
