= At Mail Call Today =

1944 song by Gene Autry and Fred Rose

Single by Gene Autry
- B-side: "I'll Be Back"
- Published: March 14, 1945 Western music pub. Co., Hollywood, Calif.
- Released: March 1945
- Recorded: December 6, 1944
- Studio: CBS Columbia Square Studio, Hollywood, California
- Genre: Country
- Length: 2:49
- Label: Okeh 6737
- Songwriters: Gene Autry, Fred Rose

Gene Autry singles chronology
"Don't Fence Me In / Gonna Build a Big Fence Around Texas" (1944)	"At Mail Call Today" (1945)	"Don't Hang Around Me Anymore" (1945)

"At Mail Call Today" is a song written by American country music artist Gene Autry and Fred Rose. The two had a successful song writing partnership dating back to 1941, including "Be Honest With Me", "Tweedle-O-Twill" and "Tears On My Pillow". Rose, with Roy Acuff, founded Acuff-Rose Music Publishing in 1942, and in 1947, would go on to producing Hank Williams. Autry, after a brief lull in film making due to WWII, would be back to his pre-war output by 1946.

== Background ==
The song is similar to other contemporary love songs and deals with the possibility of unfaithfulness. The lyrics describe a young soldier opening a Dear John letter at mail call and learning that the girl he loved from back home has left him. The final words reflect the soldier's despair:

Good luck and God bless you

Wherever you stray

The world for me ended

At Mail Call To-day.

== Chart performance ==
The song, recorded in December 1944, was Gene Autry's most successful song on the Juke Box Folk charts, peaking at number one for eight weeks with a total of twenty-two weeks on the charts. The B-side of "At Mail Call Today", a song entitled, "I'll Be Back" peaked at number seven on the same chart.

== Charts ==
Chart (1945)	Peak position
U.S. Billboard Hot Country Singles	1
