= Wesley Tuttle =

American singer-songwriter (1917–2003)

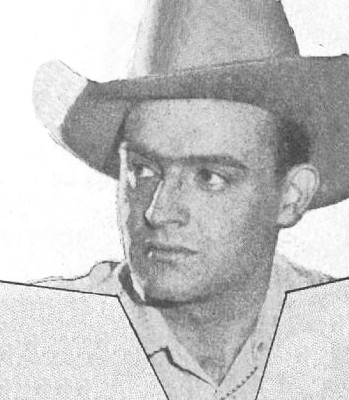

Background information
- Born: December 30, 1917
- Origin: Lamar, Colorado, United States
- Died: September 29, 2003 (aged 85)
- Genres: Country, Gospel
- Occupation: Singer-songwriter
- Instruments: Vocals, guitar, ukulele
- Years active: 1937–1973
- Labels: Capitol, Christian Faith Recordings, Sacred Records
- Formerly of: Sons of the Pioneers

Wesley Leroy Tuttle (December 30, 1917, in Lamar, Colorado – September 29, 2003) was an American country music and gospel singer and songwriter.

He was briefly a member of The Sons of the Pioneers, he made a number of successful recordings and became well known for his numerous TV appearances on programs like Town Hall Partyand Hometown Jamboree In his latter years he subsequently turned to exclusively recording Gospel music

== Biography ==
Tuttle was raised in California and took up music at age four, relearning to play guitar and ukulele after losing all but the thumb and one finger on his left hand.

He contributed the yodeling to the "Silly Song" in Walt Disney's Snow White and the Seven Dwarfs, and later backed Tex Ritter on guitar. He married actress Marilyn Myers in 1947 and acted with her in several Western films, in addition to recording the duet "Never" with her. Eyesight problems forced Tuttle into retirement in the 1970s. Wesley's last recording was in 1997, when he sang a verse of Detour on The Old Cowhands CD, "A Tribute to Wesley Tuttle".

== Discography ==
Year	Song	Peak chart positions
Year	Song	US Country
1945	"With Tears in My Eyes"	1
1946	"Detour"	4
1946	"I Wish I Had Never Met Sunshine"	5
1946	"Tho' I Tried (I Can't Forget You)"	4
1947	"Never" (with Marilyn Myers)	15
1952	"Known Only To Him"/"Gathering Home"	–
