= Sioux City Sue =

Single by Dick Thomas
- A-side: "Tumbling Tumbleweeds"
- Released: 1945
- Genre: Popular, western, folk
- Label: National
- Composer: Dick Thomas
- Lyricist: Ray Freedman

"Sioux City Sue" is a 1945 song and a 1946 movie. Lyricist Ray Freedman and composer Dick Thomas wrote the song. Thomas recorded the song in February 1945 for National Records and it was a number one Country charts hit for him. The song was Thomas' first chart entry on the Juke Box Folk Records chart and was also his most successful release: "Sioux City Sue" spent four weeks at number one on the Country charts during a stay of twenty-three weeks. The Dick Thomas version also reached Billboard's Best-selling Record charts attaining the No. 16 position.

Gene Autry sang this title song in the movie with the Cass County Boys, the first film he made after leaving military service at the end of World War II.

The most successful recording was by Bing Crosby who recorded the song on December 27, 1945 and this reached the No. 3 position in Billboard's Best-selling Record charts during a 16-week stay. His version also topped the Australian charts. The song was included in the album Bing: A Musical Autobiography in 1954.

Tony Pastor also had a chart version in 1946 with his recording on the Cosmo label which briefly reached the No. 10 spot.

== Later versions ==
- 1963 Slim Whitman for his album Yodeling.
- 1964 The Andrews Sisters for their album Great Country Hits.<
- 1994 Kaau Crater Boys on their album On Fire.
