= Dick Thomas (singer) =

American singer-songwriter

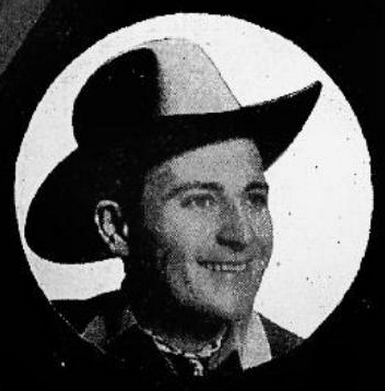
- Publicity photo of Thomas

Background information
- Born: Richard Thomas Goldhahn; September 4, 1915
- Origin: Philadelphia, Pennsylvania, United States
- Died: November 22, 2003 (aged 88)
- Genres: Country
- Occupations: Singer-songwriter, singing cowboy
- Instruments: Vocals, fiddle
- Years active: 1945–1953
- Labels: Musicraft, National, Decca

Richard Thomas Goldhahn (September 4, 1915 – November 22, 2003), known professionally as Dick Thomas, was an American singing cowboy, songwriter, and musician. He was best known for his 1945 single "Sioux City Sue", a Number One country hit and No. 16 pop hit that year which later became a country music standard and was included in a Gene Autry movie. Thomas was married to the former Maria McGarrigan from 1935 to her death in 1989. They had four sons and two daughters.

== Discography ==
Year	Song	Peak chart positions	
Year	Song	US Country	US
1945	"Sioux City Sue"	1	16
1945	"Honestly"	4	—
1948	"The Beaut from Butte"	13	—
1949	"The Sister of Sioux City Sue"	12	—
