= Bob Wills =

American musician and Western swing bandleader

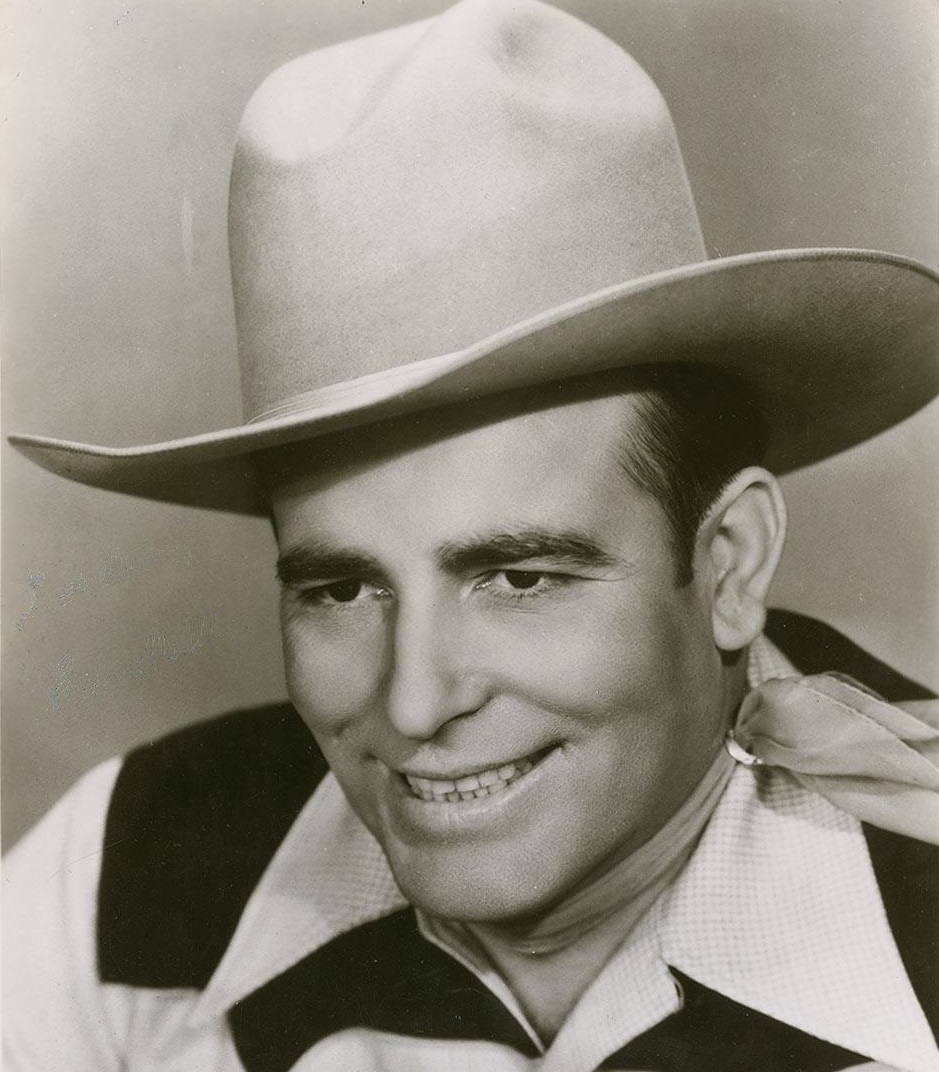
- Wills c. 1946

Background information
- Also known as: "King of Western Swing"
- Born: James Robert Wills; March 6, 1905; Kosse, Texas, U.S.
- Died: May 13, 1975 (aged 70) Fort Worth, Texas, U.S.
- Genres: Western swing
- Instruments: Fiddle, vocals
- Years active: 1929‒1973
- Labels: Vocalion, OKeh, Columbia, MGM, Liberty

James Robert Wills (March 6, 1905 – May 13, 1975) was an American musician, songwriter, and bandleader. Considered by music authorities as the founder of Western swing, he was known widely as the King of Western Swing (although Spade Cooley self-promoted the moniker "King of Western Swing" from 1942 to 1969). He was also noted for punctuating his music with his trademark "ah-haa" calls.

Wills formed several bands and played radio stations around the South and West until he formed the Texas Playboys in 1934 with himself on fiddle, Tommy Duncan on piano and vocals, the rhythm guitarist June Whalin, the tenor banjoist Johnnie Lee Wills, and Kermit Whalin, who played steel guitar and bass. The Oklahoma guitarist Eldon Shamblin joined the band in 1937, bringing jazzy influence and arrangements. The band played regularly on the Tulsa, Oklahoma, radio station KVOO and added Leon McAuliffe on steel guitar, the pianist Al Stricklin, the drummer Smokey Dacus, and a horn section that expanded the band's sound. Wills favored jazz-like arrangements, and the band found national popularity into the 1940s with such hits as "Steel Guitar Rag," "San Antonio Rose," "Smoke on the Water," "Stars and Stripes on Iwo Jima," and "New Spanish Two Step."

Wills and the Texas Playboys recorded with several publishers and companies, including Vocalion, Okeh, Columbia, and MGM. In 1950, Wills had two top 10 hits, "Ida Red likes the Boogie" and "Faded Love," which were his last hits for a decade. Throughout the 1950s, he struggled with poor health and tenuous finances. He continued to perform frequently despite a decline in the popularity of his earlier hit songs and the growing popularity of rock and roll. Wills had a heart attack in 1962 and a second one the next year, which forced him to disband the Texas Playboys. Wills continued to perform solo.

The Country Music Hall of Fame inducted Wills in 1968, and the Texas State Legislature honored him for his contribution to American music. In 1972, Wills accepted a citation from the American Society of Composers, Authors and Publishers in Nashville. He recorded an album with his fan Merle Haggard in 1973. Later he suffered two strokes that left him partially paralyzed and unable to communicate. He was comatose the last two months of his life and died in a Fort Worth nursing home from pneumonia in 1975. The Rock and Roll Hall of Fame inducted Wills and the Texas Playboys in 1999.

== Biography ==
=== Early years ===
Wills was born on a cotton farm in Kosse, Texas, to Emma Lee Foley and John Tompkins Wills. His parents were both of primarily English ancestry, but had distant Irish ancestry, as well. The entire Wills family was musically inclined. His father was a statewide champion fiddle player, and several of his siblings played musical instruments. The family frequently held country dances in their home, and while living in Hall County, Texas, they also played at "ranch dances", which were popular throughout West Texas. In this environment, Wills learned to play the fiddle and the mandolin early.

Wills not only learned traditional music from his family, but he also learned some blues songs directly from African-American families who worked in the cotton fields near Lakeview, Texas. As a child, he mainly interacted with African-American children, learning their musical styles and dances such as jigs. Aside from his own family, he knew few other white children until he was seven or eight years old.

=== New Mexico and Texas ===
The family moved to Hall County in the Texas Panhandle in 1913, and in 1919 they bought a farm between the towns of Lakeview, Texas, and Turkey, Texas. At the age of 16, Wills left the family and hopped a freight train, travelling under the name Jim Rob. He drifted from town to town trying to earn a living for several years, once nearly falling from a moving train.

In his 20s, he attended barber school, married his first wife Edna, and moved first to Roy, New Mexico, then returned to Turkey in Hall County (now considered his home town) to work as a barber at Ham's Barber Shop. He alternated barbering and fiddling, even when he moved to Fort Worth, Texas, after leaving Hall County in 1929. There, he played in minstrel and medicine shows, and, as with other Texas musicians such as Ocie Stockard, continued to earn money as a barber. He wore blackface makeup to appear in comedy routines, something that was common at the time. Wills played the violin and sang, and had two guitarists and a banjo player with him. "Bob was in blackface and was the comic; he cracked jokes, sang, and did an amazing jig dance."

Since there was already a Jim on the show, the manager began calling him Bob. As Jim Rob Wills, though, paired with Herman Arnspiger, he made his first commercial (though unissued) recordings in November 1929 for Brunswick/Vocalion. Wills quickly became known for being talkative on the bandstand, a tendency he picked up from family, local cowboys, and the style of Black musicians he had heard growing up.

While in Fort Worth, Wills added the "rowdy city blues" of Bessie Smith and Emmett Miller, whom he idolized, to a repertoire of mainly waltzes and breakdowns he had learned from his father, and patterned his vocal style after that of Miller and other performers such as Al Bernard. His 1935 version of "St. Louis Blues" replicates Al Bernard's patter from the 1928 version of the song. He described his love of Bessie Smith's music with an anecdote: "I rode horseback from the place between the rivers to Childress to see Bessie Smith... She was about the greatest thing I had ever heard. In fact, there was no doubt about it. She was the greatest thing I ever heard."

In Fort Worth, Wills met Herman Arnspiger and formed the Wills Fiddle Band. In 1930, Milton Brown joined the group as lead vocalist and brought a sense of innovation and experimentation to the band, which became known as the Aladdin Laddies and then soon renamed itself the Light Crust Doughboys because of radio sponsorship by the makers of Light Crust Flour. Brown left the band in 1932 to form the Musical Brownies, the first true Western swing band. Brown added twin fiddles, tenor banjo, and slap bass, pointing the music in the direction of swing, which they played on local radio and at dancehalls.

=== The Texas Playboys ===
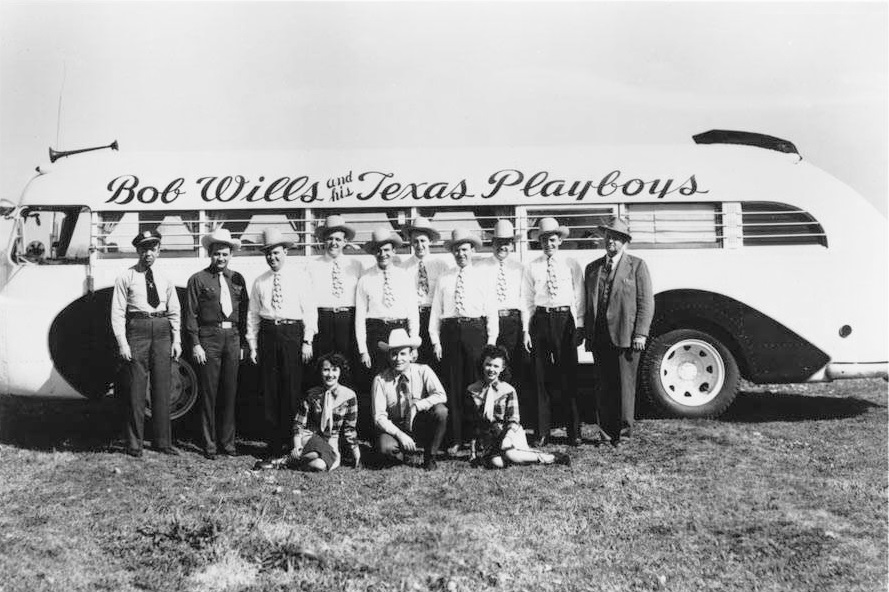
Bob Wills and his Texas Playboys

After forming a new band, The Playboys, and relocating to Waco, Texas, Wills found enough popularity there to decide on a bigger market. They left Waco in January 1934 for Oklahoma City. Wills soon settled the renamed Texas Playboys in Tulsa, Oklahoma, and began broadcasting noon shows over the 50,000-watt KVOO radio station, from the stage of Cain's Ballroom. They also played dances in the evenings. Wills largely sang blues and sentimental ballads. "Lone Star Rag", "Rat Cheese Under the Hill", "Take Me Back to Tulsa", "Basin Street Blues", "Steel Guitar Rag", and "Trouble in Mind" were some of the songs in the extensive repertory played by Wills and the Playboys.

Wills added a trumpet to the band inadvertently when he hired Everet Stover as an announcer, not knowing that he had played with the New Orleans symphony and had directed the governor's band in Austin. Stover, thinking he had been hired as a trumpeter, began playing with the band, and Wills never stopped him. Although Wills initially disapproved of it, young saxophonist Zeb McNally was eventually hired. Wills hired the young, "modern-style musician" Smoky Dacus as a drummer to balance out the horns.

He continued to expand the lineup through the mid- to late 1930s. The addition of steel guitar whiz Leon McAuliffe in March 1935 added not only a formidable instrumentalist, but also a second engaging vocalist. Wills and the Texas Playboys did their first recordings on September 23–25, 1935, in Dallas. Session rosters from 1938 show both lead guitar and electric guitar in addition to guitar and steel guitar in the Texas Playboys recordings. About this time, Wills purchased and performed with an antique Guadagnini violin. The instrument, worth an estimated $7,600 at the time, was purchased for only $1,600. In 1940, "New San Antonio Rose" sold a million records and became the signature song of the Texas Playboys. The "front line" of Wills' orchestra consisted of either fiddles or guitars after 1944.

=== Film career ===
In 1940, Wills, along with the Texas Playboys, co-starred with Tex Ritter in Take Me Back to Oklahoma. Altogether, Wills appeared in 19 films, including The Lone Prairie (1942), Riders of the Northwest Mounted (1943), Saddles and Sagebrush (1943), The Vigilantes Ride (1943), The Last Horseman (1944), Rhythm Round-Up (1945), Blazing the Western Trail (1945), and Lawless Empire (1945).

=== Swing era ===
In December 1942, after several band members had left the group, and as World War II raged, Wills joined the Army at the age of 37, but received a medical discharge in 1943. After leaving the Army, Wills moved to Hollywood and began to reorganize the Texas Playboys. He became an enormous draw in Los Angeles, where many of his fans had relocated during the Great Depression and World War II in search of jobs. Monday through Friday, the band played the noon hour timeslot over KMTR-AM (now KLAC) in Los Angeles. They also played regularly at the Mission Beach Ballroom in San Diego.

He commanded enormous fees playing dances there, and began to make more creative use of electric guitars to replace the big horn sections the Tulsa band had boasted. For a very brief period in 1944, the Wills band included 23 members, and around mid-year, he toured Northern California and the Pacific Northwest with 21 pieces in the orchestra. Billboard reported that Wills out-grossed Harry James, Benny Goodman, "both Dorsey brothers bands, et al." at Civic Auditorium in Oakland, California, in January 1944.

Wills and His Texas Playboys began their first cross-country tour in November 1944, and appeared on the Grand Ole Opry on December 30, 1944. According to Opry policy, drums and horns were considered pop instruments, inappropriate to country music. The Opry had two Western swing bands on its roster, led by Pee Wee King and Paul Howard. Neither was allowed to use their drummers at the Opry. Wills' band at the time consisted of two fiddlers, two bass fiddles, two electric guitars, electric steel guitar, and a trumpet. Wills's then-drummer was Monte Mountjoy, who played in the Dixieland style. Wills battled Opry officials and refused to perform without his drummer. An attempt to compromise by keeping Mountjoy behind a curtain collapsed when Wills had his drums placed front and center onstage at the last minute.

In 1945, Wills' dances were drawing larger crowds than dances put on by Tommy Dorsey and Benny Goodman. That year, he lived in both Santa Monica and Fresno, California. In 1947, he opened the Wills Point nightclub in Sacramento, California, and continued touring the Southwest and Pacific Northwest from Texas to Washington. In Sacramento, he broadcast shows over KFBK, a station whose reach encompassed much of the American West. Wills was in such high demand that venues would book him even on weeknights, because they knew the show would still be a draw.

During the postwar period, KGO radio in San Francisco syndicated a Bob Wills and His Texas Playboys show recorded at the Fairmont Hotel. Many of these recordings survive today as the Tiffany Transcriptions and are available on CD. They show off the band's strengths significantly, in part because the group was not confined to the three-minute limits of 78 RPM discs. On April 3, 1948, Wills and the Texas Playboys appeared for the inaugural broadcast of the Louisiana Hayride on KWKH, broadcasting from the Municipal Auditorium in Shreveport, Louisiana.

Wills and the Texas Playboys played dances throughout the West to more than 10,000 people every week. They held dance attendance records at Jantzen Beach in Portland, Oregon; Santa Monica, California; Klamath Falls, Oregon; and California's Oakland Auditorium, where they drew 19,000 people over two nights. Wills recalled the early days of what became known as Western swing music in a 1949 interview: "Here's the way I figure it. We sure not tryin' to take credit for swingin' it."

Still a binge drinker, Wills became increasingly unreliable in the late 1940s, causing a rift with Tommy Duncan (who bore the brunt of audience anger when Wills's binges prevented him from appearing). It ended when he fired Duncan in the fall of 1948.

=== Later years ===
Having lived a lavish lifestyle in California, Wills moved back to Oklahoma City in 1949, then went back on the road to maintain his payroll and Wills Point. He opened a second club, the Bob Wills Ranch House, in Dallas, Texas. Turning the club over to managers, later revealed to be dishonest, left Wills in desperate financial straits with heavy debts to the IRS for back taxes. This caused him to sell many assets, including the rights to "New San Antonio Rose".

In 1950, Wills had two top-10 hits, "Ida Red Likes the Boogie" and "Faded Love". After 1950, radio stations began to increasingly specialize in one form or another of commercially popular music. Although usually labelled "country and western", Wills did not fit into the style played on popular country and western stations, which typically played music in the Nashville sound. Neither did he fit into the conventional sound of pop stations, although he played a good deal of pop music.

Wills continued to appear at the Bostonia Ballroom in San Diego throughout the 1950s. He continued to tour and record through the 1950s into the early 1960s despite the fact that Western swing's popularity, even in the Southwest, had greatly diminished. Charles R. Townsend described his drop in popularity: Bob could draw "a thousand people on Monday night between 1950 and 1952, but he could not do that by 1956. Entertainment habits had changed."

On Wills' return to Tulsa late in 1957, Jim Downing of the Tulsa Tribune wrote an article headlined "Wills Brothers Together Again: Bob Back with Heavy Beat". The article quotes Wills as saying "Rock and roll? Why, man, that's the same kind of music we've been playin' since 1928! ... We didn't call it rock and roll back when we introduced it as our style back in 1928, and we don't call it rock and roll the way we play it now. But it's just basic rhythm and has gone by a lot of different names in my time. It's the same, whether you just follow a drum beat like in Africa or surround it with a lot of instruments. The rhythm's what's important." The use of amplified guitars accentuates Wills's claim; some Bob Wills recordings from the 1930s and 1940s sound similar to rock and roll records of the 1950s.

Even a 1958 return to KVOO, where his younger brother Johnnie Lee Wills had maintained the family's presence, did not produce the success he hoped. He appeared twice on ABC-TV's Jubilee USA and kept the band on the road into the 1960s. After two heart attacks, in 1965, he dissolved the Texas Playboys (who briefly continued as an independent unit) to perform solo with house bands. While he did well in Las Vegas and other areas, and made records for the Kapp Records label, he was largely a forgotten figure—even though inducted into the Country Music Hall of Fame in 1968. A 1969 stroke left his right side paralyzed, ending his active career. He did, however, recover sufficiently to appear in a wheelchair at various Wills tributes held in the early 1970s. A revival of interest in his music, spurred by Merle Haggard's 1970 album A Tribute to the Best Damn Fiddle Player in the World, led to a 1973 reunion album, teaming Wills, who spoke with difficulty, with key members of the early band, as well as Haggard.

Wills died in Fort Worth of pneumonia on May 13, 1975.

== Personal life ==
Bob Wills was married six times and divorced five times. He was twice married to, and twice divorced from, Mary Helen Brown, the widow of Wills' ex-band member Milton Brown.

- Edna Posey, married 1926, divorced 1935 (one daughter, Robbie Joe Wills)
- Ruth McMaster, married 1936, divorced 1936
- Mary Helen Brown, married 1938, divorced 1938, remarried 1938, divorced 1939
- Mary Louise Parker, married 1939, divorced 1939 (one daughter, Rosetta Wills)
- Betty Anderson, married 1942 (four children, James Robert II, Carolyn, Diane, and Cindy Wills)

== Legacy ==
Wills' style influenced performers Buck Owens, Merle Haggard, and The Strangers and helped to spawn a style of music now known as the Bakersfield Sound. (Bakersfield, California, was one of Wills' regular stops in his heyday). A 1970 tribute album by Haggard, A Tribute to the Best Damn Fiddle Player in the World (or, My Salute to Bob Wills) directed a wider audience to Wills's music, as did the appearance of younger "revival" bands like Asleep at the Wheel and Commander Cody and His Lost Planet Airmen plus the growing popularity of longtime Wills disciple and fan Willie Nelson. By 1971, Wills recovered sufficiently to travel occasionally and appear at tribute concerts. In 1973, he participated in a final reunion session with members of some of the Texas Playboys from the 1930s to the 1960s. Merle Haggard was invited to play at this reunion. The session, scheduled for two days, took place in December 1973, with the album to be titled For the Last Time. Wills, speaking or attempting to holler, appeared on a couple tracks from the first day's session but suffered a stroke overnight. He had a more severe one a few days later. The musicians completed the album without him. Wills by then was comatose. He lingered until his death on May 13, 1975.

Reviewing For the Last Time in Christgau's Record Guide: Rock Albums of the Seventies (1981), Robert Christgau wrote: "This double-LP doesn't represent the band at its peak. But though earlier recordings of most of these classic tunes are at least marginally sharper, it certainly captures the relaxed, playful, eclectic Western swing groove that Wills invited in the '30s."

In addition to being inducted into the Country Music Hall of Fame in 1968, Wills was inducted into the Nashville Songwriters Hall of Fame in 1970, the Rock and Roll Hall of Fame in the Early Influence category along with the Texas Playboys in 1999, and received the Grammy Lifetime Achievement Award in 2007.

From 1974 until his 2002 death, Waylon Jennings performed a song he had written called "Bob Wills Is Still the King". Released as the B-side of a single that was a double-sided hit, it went to number one on the country charts. The song has become a staple of classic country radio station formats. In addition, The Rolling Stones performed this song live in Austin, Texas, at Zilker Park on their A Bigger Bang Tour, a shout-out to Wills. This performance was included on their subsequent DVD The Biggest Bang. In a 1968 issue of Guitar Player, rock guitarist Jimi Hendrix said of Wills and the Playboys: "I dig them. The Grand Ole Opry used to come on, and I used to watch that. They used to have some pretty heavy cats, some heavy guitar players." In fact, Bob Wills and His Texas Playboys only performed on the Opry twice: in 1944 and 1948. Hendrix almost surely referred to Nashville guitarists.

Wills ranked number 27 in CMT's 40 Greatest Men in Country Music in 2003.

Wills' upbeat 1938 song "Ida Red" was Chuck Berry's primary inspiration for creating his first rock-and-roll hit "Maybellene".

Fats Domino once remarked that he patterned his 1960 rhythm section after that of Bob Wills.

During the 49th Grammy Awards in 2007, Carrie Underwood performed his song "San Antonio Rose". Today, George Strait performs Wills' music on concert tours and records songs influenced by Wills and his Texas-style swing.

The Austin-based Western swing band Asleep at the Wheel has honored Wills' music since the band's inception, mostly notably with their continuing performances of the musical drama A Ride with Bob, which debuted in Austin in March 2005 to coincide with celebrations of Wills' 100th birthday.

The Bob Wills Birthday Celebration is held every year in March at the Cain's Ballroom in Tulsa, Oklahoma, with a Western swing concert and dance.

In 2004, a documentary film about his life and music, titled Fiddlin' Man: The Life and Music of Bob Wills, was released by VIEW Inc.

In 2011, Proper Records released an album by Hot Club of Cowtown titled What Makes Bob Holler: A Tribute to Bob Wills and His Texas Playboys and the Texas Legislature adopted a resolution designating Western swing as the official State Music of Texas.

The Greenville Chamber of Commerce hosts an annual Bob Wills Fiddle Festival and Contest in downtown Greenville, Texas, in November.

Bob Wills was honored in episode two of Ken Burns' 2019 series on PBS called Country Music.

In 2021, Wills was inducted into the Texas Cowboy Hall of Fame.

== Select discography ==
=== Albums ===
Year	Album	US Country	Label	Notes
1947	Bob Wills Round Up		Columbia	Originally issued in 1947 as a 4-disc 78 rpm album set (C-128); reissued in 1948 (H-2) and 1949 as a 10" (HL-9003)
1951	Ranch House Favorites		MGM	10" (E-91); also issued as a 4-disc 78 rpm album set (MGM-91), and a 4-disc 45 rpm album set (K-91)
1953	Old Time Favorites		The Antones (Los Angeles, California)	10" (LP-6000); issued as a limited edition 'Fan Club Members Only' release
1954	Old Time Favorites, Vol. 2		The Antones (Los Angeles, California)	10" (LP-6010); issued as a limited edition 'Fan Club Members Only' release
1955	Country and Western Dance-O-Rama, No. 2		Decca	10" (DL-5562)
1956	Ranch House Favorites, Vol. 2		MGM	E-3352
1957	Bob Wills Special		Harmony	HL-7036; reissue of Bob Wills Round Up plus 2 extra tracks, August
July 1958	Bob Wills and His Texas Playboys		Decca	DL-8727
1960	Together Again		Liberty	With Tommy Duncan; LRP-3173
1961	A Living Legend		Liberty	With Tommy Duncan; LRP-3182
1961	Mr. Words & Mr. Music		Liberty	With Tommy Duncan; LRP-3194
1963	Bob Wills Sings & Plays		Liberty	With Tommy Duncan; LRP-3303
1965	Bob Wills Keepsake Album No. 1		Longhorn	LP-001
1966	From the Heart of Texas	33	Kapp	
1967	King of Western Swing	43	Kapp	
1968	Here's That Man Again	24	Kapp	
1970	The Best of Bob Wills		Kapp	
1971	San Antonio Rose		Vocalion	VL 73922
1973	Bob Wills Plays the Greatest String Band Hits	28	MCA	Re-release; originally issued in 1969
1973	The Bob Wills Anthology		Columbia	2LP
1974	For the Last Time	28	United Artists	2LP
1975	The Best of Bob Wills, Vol. II	36	MCA	2LP
1976	Remembering ...The Greatest Hits of Bob Wills	46	Columbia	
1976	Bob Wills and His Texas Playboys 'In Concert'	44	Capitol	2LP
1977	24 Great Hits by Bob Wills and His Texas Playboys	39	MGM	2LP
1991	Bob Wills and His Texas Playboys 'Anthology 1935–1973'		Rhino	2CD
1992	The Essential Bob Wills (1935–1947)		Columbia/Legacy	
2001	Boot Heel Drag: The MGM Years		Mercury/Universal	2CD
2006	Legends of Country Music: Bob Wills and His Texas Playboys		Columbia/Legacy	4CD

=== Singles ===
Year	Single	US Country	Label
1935	"St. Louis Blues" / "Four or Five Times"		Vocalion 03076
1935	"Good Old Oklahoma" / "Mexicali Rose"		Vocalion 03086
1935	"Osage Stomp" / "Get with It"		Vocalion 03096
1936	"Sitting on Top of the World" / "Black and Blue Rag"		Vocalion 03139
1936	"I Can't Be Satisfied" / "Wang Wang Blues"		Vocalion 03173
1936	"I Ain't Got Nobody (and Nobody Cares for Me)" / "Who Walks in When I Walk Out?"		Vocalion 03206
1936	"Spanish Two Step" / "Blue River"		Vocalion 03230
1936	"I Can't Give You Anything but Love" / "Never No More Blues"		Vocalion 03264
1936	"Old Fashioned Love" / "Oklahoma Rag"		Vocalion 03295
1936	"Trouble in Mind" / "Weary of the Same Ol' Stuff"		Vocalion 03343
1936	"Basin Street Blues" / "Red Hot Gal of Mine"		Vocalion 03344
1936	"Sugar Blues" / "Fan It"		Vocalion 03361
1936	"Smith's Reel" / "Harmony" [billed as 'Bob Wills and Sleepy Johnson']		Melotone 6-11-58
1936	"Steel Guitar Rag" / "Swing Blues No. 1"		Vocalion 03394
1937	"She's Killing Me" / "What's the Matter with the Mill?"		Vocalion 03424
1937	"Get Along Home Cindy" / "Right or Wrong"		Vocalion 03451
1937	"Mean Mama Blues" / "Bring It on Down to My House"		Vocalion 03492
1937	"No Matter How She Done It (She's Just a Dirty Dame)" / "Too Busy!"		Vocalion 03537
1937	"Back Home Again in Indiana" / "Swing Blues No. 2"		Vocalion 03578
1937	"Dedicated to You" / "Bleeding Hearted Blues"		Vocalion 03597
1937	"White Heat" / "Bluin' the Blues"		Vocalion 03614
1937	"I'm a Ding Dong Daddy (from Dumas)" / "Rosetta"		Vocalion 03659
1937	"The New St. Louis Blues" / "Oozlin' Daddy Blues"		Vocalion 03693
1937	"Playboy Stomp" / "Tie Me to Your Apron Strings Again"		Vocalion 03854
1938	"Maiden's Prayer" / "Never No More Hard Time Blues"		Vocalion 03924
1938	"Steel Guitar Stomp" / "Sunbonnet Sue"		Vocalion 03997
1938	"Black Rider" / "Everybody Does It in Hawaii"		Vocalion 04132
1938	"Keep Knocking (but You Can't Come In)" / "Empty Bed Blues"		Vocalion 04184
1938	"Alexander's Ragtime Band" / "Gambling Polka Dot Blues"		Vocalion 04275
1938	"Tulsa Stomp" / "Little Red Head"		Vocalion 04235
1938	"Loveless Love" / "Way Down upon the Swanee River"		Vocalion 04387
1938	"Moonlight and Roses (Bring Mem'ries of You)" / "I Wish I Could Shimmy Like My Sister Kate"		Vocalion 04439
1938	"Oh, Lady Be Good" / "Oh You Beautiful Doll"		Vocalion 04515
1939	"I Wonder if You Feel the Way I Do" / "That's What I Like 'Bout the South"		Vocalion 04566
1939	"Whoa Babe" / "Little Girl, Go Ask Your Mama"		Vocalion 04625
1939	"San Antonio Rose" / "The Convict and the Rose"		Vocalion 04755
1939	"You're Okay" / "Liza Pull Down the Shades"		Vocalion 04839
1939	"Silver Bells" / "Yearning Just for You"		Vocalion 04934
1939	"Beaumont Rag" / "The Waltz You Saved for Me"		Vocalion 04999
1939	"Ida Red" / "Carolina in the Morning"		Vocalion 05079
1939	"Dreamy Eyes Waltz" / "My Window Faces the South"		Vocalion 05161
1939	"If I Could Bring Back My Buddy" / "Prosperity Special"		Vocalion 05228
1940	"Don't Let the Deal Go Down" / "Drunkard Blues"		Vocalion 05282
1940	"Blue Prelude" / "Sophisticated Hula"		Vocalion 05333
1940	"Pray for the Lights to Go Out" / "Twinkle Twinkle Little Star"		Vocalion 05401
1940	"Blue Bonnet Rag" / "Medley of Spanish Waltzes: La Golondrina / Lady of Spain / Cielito Lindo"		Vocalion 05523
1940	"You Don't Love Me (but I'll Always Care)" / "No Wonder"		Vocalion 05597
1940	"Lone Star Rag" / "I Don't Lov'a Nobody"		OKeh 05637
1940	"New San Antonio Rose" / "Bob Wills' Special"		OKeh 05694
1940	"That Brownskin Gal" / "Time Changes Everything"		OKeh 05753
1940	"There's Going to Be a Party (for the Old Folks)" / "Big Beaver"		OKeh 05905
1941	"Take Me Back to Tulsa" / "New Worried Mind"		OKeh 06101
1941	"Maiden's Prayer" / "Takin' It Home"		OKeh 06205
1941	"Twin Guitar Special" / "Lyla Lou"		OKeh 06327
1941	"Bob Wills' Stomp" / "Lil Liza Jane"		OKeh 06371
1941	"Corrine, Corrina" / "Goodnight Little Sweetheart"		OKeh 06530
1942	"Cherokee Maiden" / "Ride On! (My Prairie Pinto)"		OKeh 06568
1942	"Dusty Skies" / "It's All Your Fault"		OKeh 06598
1942	"Oh! You Pretty Woman" / "I Knew the Moment I Lost You"		OKeh 06640
1942	"Please Don't Leave Me" / "My Life's Been a Pleasure"		OKeh 6681
1942	"This Little Rosary" / "When It's Honey Suckle Time in the Valley" (Unreleased)		OKeh 6692
1942	"Ten Years" / "Let's Ride with Bob (Theme Song)"		OKeh 6692
1942	"My Confession" / "Whose Heart Are You Breaking Now?"		OKeh 6703
1943	"Home in San Antone" / "Miss Molly"		OKeh 6710
1944	"We Might as Well Forget It" / "You're from Texas"	2	OKeh 6722
1945	"Goodbye, Liza Jane" / It Seems Like Yesterday" (Unreleased)		OKeh 6734
1945	"Smoke on the Water"	1	OKeh 6736
1945	/ "Hang Your Head in Shame"	3	OKeh 6736
1945	"Stars and Stripes on Iwo Jima"	1	OKeh 6742
1945	/ "You Don't Care What Happens to Me"	5	OKeh 6742
1945	"Silver Dew on the Blue Grass Tonight"	1	Columbia 36841
1945	/ "Texas Playboy Rag"	2	Columbia 36841
1945	"White Cross on Okinawa"	1	Columbia 36881
1945	/ "Empty Chair at the Christmas Table"		Columbia 36881
1946	"New Spanish Two Step"	1	Columbia 36966
1946	/ "Roly Poly"	3	Columbia 36966
1946	"Stay a Little Longer"	2	Columbia 37097
1946	/ "I Can't Go on This Way"	4	Columbia 37097
1946	"Cotton Eyed Joe" / "Staccato Waltz"		Columbia 37212
1947	"There's a Big Rock in the Road"		Columbia 37205
1947	/ "I'm Gonna Be Boss from Now On"	5	Columbia 37205
1947	"Sugar Moon"	1	Columbia 37313
1947	/ "Brain Cloudy Blues"		Columbia 37313
1947	"Rose of Old Pawnee"		Columbia 37357
1947	/ "Bob Wills Boogie"	4	Columbia 37357
1947	"How Can It Be Wrong?" / "Punkin' Stomp"		Columbia 37564
1947	"Fat Boy Rag" / "You Should Have Thought of That Before"		Columbia 37824
1947	"Liberty" / "The Kind of Love I Can't Forget"		Columbia 37926
1947	"A Sweet Kind of Love" / "Cowboy Stomp"		Columbia 37988
1947	"Spanish Fandango""		MGM 10116
1947	/ "Bubbles in My Beer"	4	MGM 10116
1948	"Deep Water" / "This is Southland"		Columbia 38137
1948	"Texarkana Baby"	15	Columbia 38179
1948	"Keeper of My Heart"	8	MGM 10175
1948	"'Neath Hawaiian Palms"		MGM 10236
1948	/ "Thorn in My Heart"	10	MGM 10236
1950	"Ida Red Likes the Boogie"	10	MGM 10570
1950	"Jolie Blond Likes the Boogie" / "Pastime Blues"		MGM 10681
1950	"Faded Love"	8	MGM 10786
1950	"'Tater Pie" / "I Didn't Realize"		MGM 10836
1953	"I Won't Be Back Tonight" / "B. Bowman Hop"		MGM 11568
1953	"As I Sit Broken-Hearted" / "Bottle Baby Boogie"		MGM 11635
1960	"Heart to Heart Talk" (with Tommy Duncan)	5	Liberty 55260
1961	"The Image of Me" (with Tommy Duncan)	26	Liberty 55264
1976	"Ida Red"	99	Capitol 4332

== See also ==
- Aragon Ballroom (Ocean Park)

== Bibliography ==
- Townsend, Charles R. (1998). "Bob Wills". In The Encyclopedia of Country Music. Paul Kinsbury, Editor. New York: Oxford University Press. pp. 594–95.
- West, Elliot. "Trails and Footprints: The Past of the Future Southern Plains". The Future of the Southern Plains (pp. 17–37) edited by Sherry L. Smith. University of Oklahoma Press, 2005. ISBN 978-0-8061-3735-3
- Whitburn, Joel. The Billboard Book of Top 40 Country Hits. Billboard Books, 2006. ISBN 0-8230-8291-1
- Wolff, Kurt; Orla Duane. Country Music: The Rough Guide. Rough Guides, 2000. ISBN 1-85828-534-8
