= Billboard Most-Played Folk Records of 1947 =

The Billboard Most-Played Folk Records of 1947 is a year-end chart compiled Billboard magazine ranking the year's top folk records based on the number of times the record was played on the nation's juke boxes. In 1947, country music records were included on, and dominated, the Billboard folk records chart.

"Smoke! Smoke! Smoke! (That Cigarette)" by the Tex Williams Western Caravan was the No. 1 folk record of 1947, receiving 103 points on the juke box chart. "It's a Sin" by Eddy Arnold and His Texas Playboys was the No 2 record with 96 points, and "So Round, So Firm, So Fully Packed by Merle Travis ranked third with 91 points.

Three variations on the Cajun classic "Jole Blon" also appeared on the year-end folk chart: "New Jolie Blonde" by Red Foley (No. 7); "New Pretty Blonde" by Moon Mullican (no. 9); and "(Our Own) Jole Blon" by Roy Acuff (No. 15).

Eddy Arnold led all artists with four records on the year-end folk chart, including three of the top five records. Red Foley, Merle Travis, Ernest Tubb, and Tex Williams each had two records included on the year-end chart.

The top records were evenly distributed among the major labels with four records apiece for Capitol (including Capitol Americana), Columbia, Decca, and RCA Victor.

Juke box year-end	Peak (Note: This column recites the record's peak position on Billboard's weekly charts.)	Title	Artist(s)	Label
1	1	"Smoke! Smoke! Smoke! (That Cigarette)"	Tex Williams Western Caravan	Capitol Americana
2	1	"It's a Sin"	Eddy Arnold	Victor
3	1	"So Round, So Firm, So Fully Packed	Merle Travis	Capitol
4	1	"What Is Life Without Love"	Eddy Arnold	Victor
5	1	"I'll Hold You in My Heart (Till I Can Hold You in My Arms)"	Eddy Arnold	Victor
6	2	"Temptation (Tim-tayshun)"	Red Ingle Natural Seven-Jo Stafford	Capitol
7	1	"New Jolie Blonde"	Red Foley	Decca
8	1	"Rainbow at Midnight"	Ernest Tubb	Decca
9	2	"New Pretty Blonde"	Moon Mullican	King
10	1	"Divorce Me C.O.D."	Merle Travis	Capitol
11	1	"Sugar Moon"	Bob Wills	Columbia
12	2	"To My Sorrow"	Eddy Arnold	Victor
13	2	"Filipino Baby"	Ernest Tubb	Decca
14	4	"That's What I Like About the West"	Tex Williams Western Caravan	Capitol Americana
15	4	"(Our Own) Jole Blon"	Roy Acuff	Columbia
16	4	"Down at the Roadside Inn"	Al Dexter	Columbia
16	4	"Feudin' and Fightin'	Dorothy Shay	Columbia
16	2	"Never Trust a Woman"	Red Foley	Decca

== See also ==
- Billboard year-end top singles of 1947
- 1947 in country music
