= List of Most Played Juke Box Folk Records number ones of 1947 =

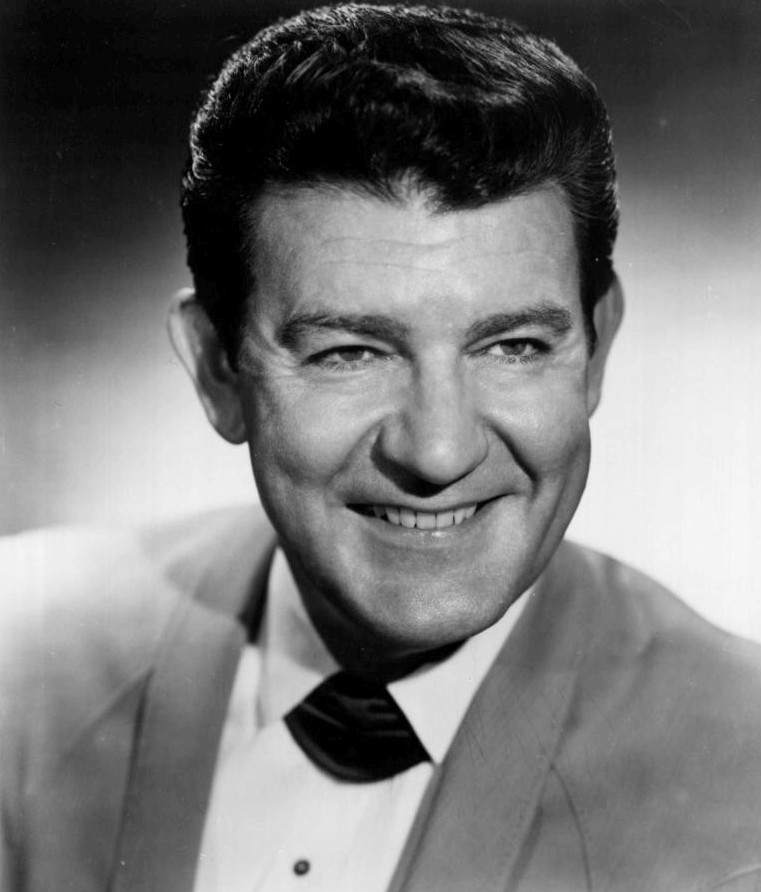
Tex Williams (pictured in later life) spent 15 consecutive weeks at number one with "Smoke! Smoke! Smoke! (That Cigarette)".

From 1944 until 1957, Billboard magazine published a chart that ranked the most-played country music songs in jukeboxes in the United States, based on a survey of over 3000 operators "in all sections of the country"; until 1948 it was the magazine's only country music chart. In 1947, nine songs topped the chart, which was published under the title Most Played Juke Box Folk Records with the exception of the issues of Billboard dated September 6 through November 1, when it was titled Most Played Juke Box Hillbilly Records. The Juke Box Folk chart is considered the start of the lineage of the magazine's current country music songs charts.

The number-one position was dominated in 1947 by three artists who each topped the chart for at least 14 weeks. At the start of the year, Merle Travis was at number one with "Divorce Me C.O.D." which had spent 11 weeks in the top spot in 1946, and spent three further non-consecutive weeks atop the chart in 1947, interrupted for a single week by Ernest Tubb's "Rainbow at Midnight". Tubb's song replaced "Divorce Me C.O.D." at number one again in the issue of Billboard dated February 1, but the following week Travis returned to number one with a different single, "So Round, So Firm, So Fully Packed". This song spent fourteen consecutive weeks at number one, giving him a total of seventeen weeks atop the chart in 1947, the most by any artist. Two weeks after Travis relinquished the number-one position, Eddy Arnold achieved the first chart-topper of his career with "What Is Life Without Love". He had two more number ones before the end of the year, making him the only artist with three chart-toppers in 1947. He ended the year atop the listing with "I'll Hold You in My Heart (Till I Can Hold You in My Arms)". Arnold would dominate the Juke Box Folk chart the following year, spending almost all of 1948 at number one, and remain popular into the 1950s before his career went into a decline. He revived his fortunes in the mid-1960s, however, by embracing the "Nashville sound", a newer style of country music which eschewed elements of the earlier honky-tonk style in favor of smooth productions which had a broader appeal, and ended his career with a record total of 28 number-one country singles.

The longest unbroken run at number one in 1947 was the fifteen consecutive weeks achieved by Tex Williams with "Smoke! Smoke! Smoke! (That Cigarette)", which was atop the chart from July until October. This was the first chart-topper for Williams in his own right, although he had been the uncredited vocalist on Western swing bandleader Spade Cooley's 1945 number one "Shame on You". Following the success of that record, Cooley and Williams had fallen out, leading to Williams leaving Cooley's band and taking most of the musicians with him to form the new group Western Caravan, which backed him on "Smoke! Smoke! Smoke!" Despite the success of the single, which was the first million-selling record released on the Capitol label, it would prove to be the only number one for Williams. Of the six singers who topped the Juke Box Folk chart in 1947, all except for Williams have been elected to the Country Music Hall of Fame.

== Chart history ==
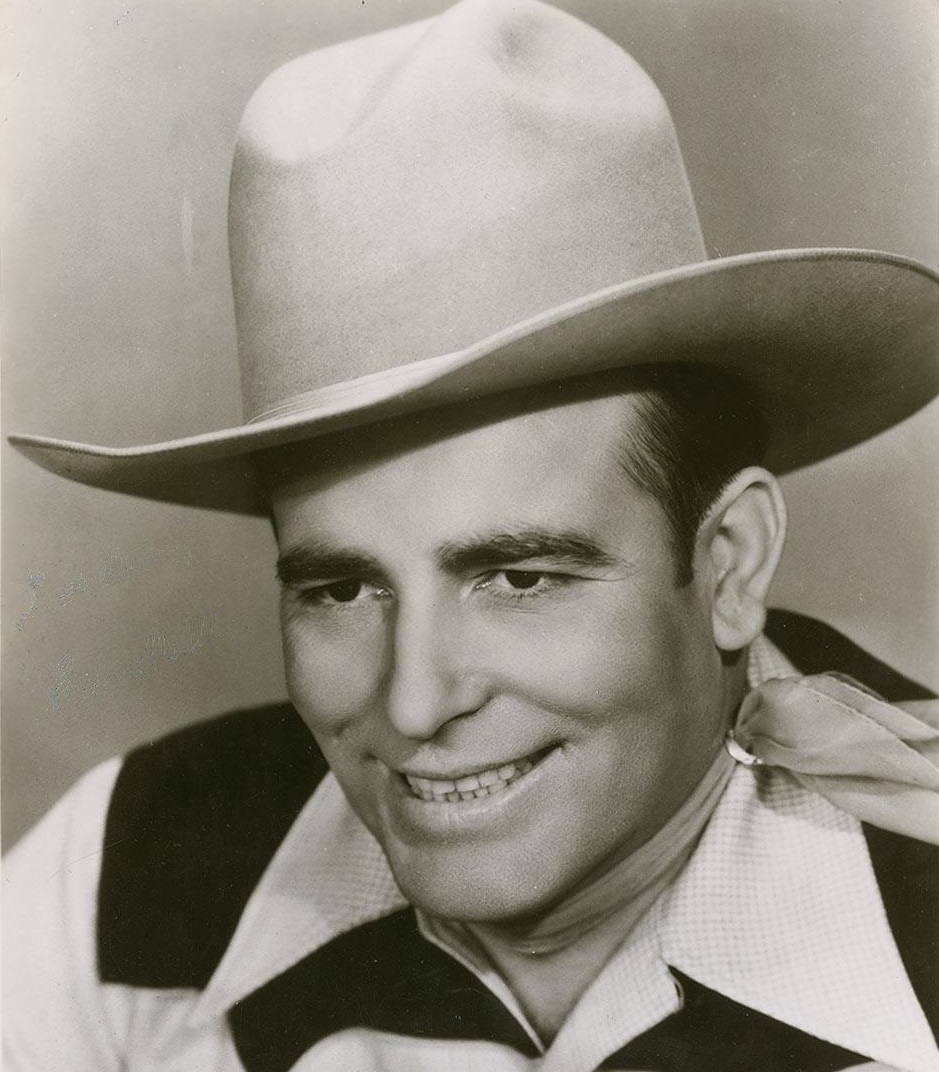
Bob Wills, known as the "King of Western swing", topped the chart with "Sugar Moon".

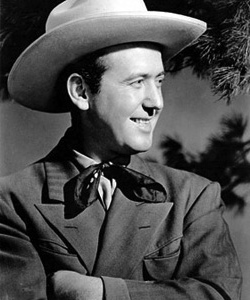
Red Foley reached number one with "New Jolie Blonde (New Pretty Blonde)", one of three versions of the song to enter the chart in 1947.

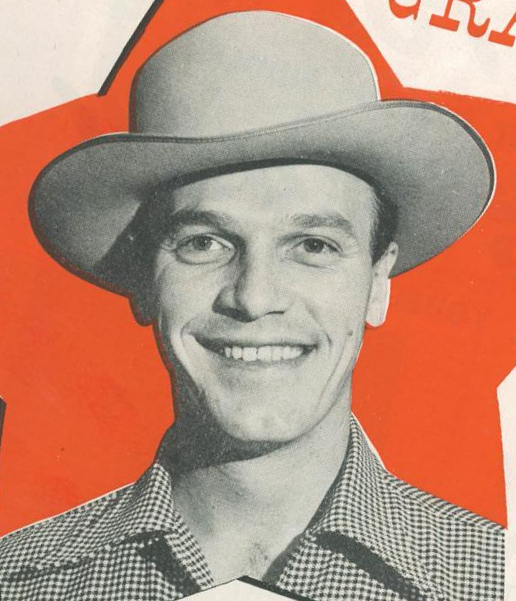
Eddy Arnold topped the chart for the first time in 1947. He would go on to become one of the most successful singers in country music history.

Issue date	Title	Artist(s)	Ref.
January 4	"Divorce Me C.O.D."	Merle Travis	
January 11	"Divorce Me C.O.D."	Merle Travis	
January 18	"Rainbow at Midnight"	Ernest Tubb	
January 25	"Divorce Me C.O.D."	Merle Travis	
February 1	"Rainbow at Midnight"	Ernest Tubb	
February 8	"So Round, So Firm, So Fully Packed"	Merle Travis	
February 15	"So Round, So Firm, So Fully Packed"	Merle Travis	
February 22	"So Round, So Firm, So Fully Packed"	Merle Travis	
March 1	"So Round, So Firm, So Fully Packed"	Merle Travis	
March 8	"So Round, So Firm, So Fully Packed"	Merle Travis	
March 15	"So Round, So Firm, So Fully Packed"	Merle Travis	
March 22	"So Round, So Firm, So Fully Packed"	Merle Travis	
March 29	"So Round, So Firm, So Fully Packed"	Merle Travis	
April 5	"So Round, So Firm, So Fully Packed"	Merle Travis	
April 12	"So Round, So Firm, So Fully Packed"	Merle Travis	
April 19	"So Round, So Firm, So Fully Packed"	Merle Travis	
April 26	"So Round, So Firm, So Fully Packed"	Merle Travis	
May 3	"So Round, So Firm, So Fully Packed"	Merle Travis	
May 10	"So Round, So Firm, So Fully Packed"	Merle Travis	
May 17	"New Jolie Blonde (New Pretty Blonde)"	Red Foley and the Cumberland Valley Boys	
May 24	"What Is Life Without Love"	Eddy Arnold and his Tennessee Plowboys	
May 31	"New Jolie Blonde (New Pretty Blonde)"	Red Foley and the Cumberland Valley Boys	
June 7	"Sugar Moon"	Bob Wills and his Texas Playboys	
June 14	"It's a Sin"	Eddy Arnold and his Tennessee Plowboys	
June 21	"It's a Sin"	Eddy Arnold and his Tennessee Plowboys	
June 28	"It's a Sin"	Eddy Arnold and his Tennessee Plowboys	
July 5	"It's a Sin"	Eddy Arnold and his Tennessee Plowboys	
July 12	"It's a Sin"	Eddy Arnold and his Tennessee Plowboys	
July 19	"Smoke! Smoke! Smoke! (That Cigarette)"	Tex Williams's Western Caravan	
July 26	"Smoke! Smoke! Smoke! (That Cigarette)"	Tex Williams's Western Caravan	
August 2	"Smoke! Smoke! Smoke! (That Cigarette)"	Tex Williams's Western Caravan	
August 9	"Smoke! Smoke! Smoke! (That Cigarette)"	Tex Williams's Western Caravan	
August 16	"Smoke! Smoke! Smoke! (That Cigarette)"	Tex Williams's Western Caravan	
August 23	"Smoke! Smoke! Smoke! (That Cigarette)"	Tex Williams's Western Caravan	
August 30	"Smoke! Smoke! Smoke! (That Cigarette)"	Tex Williams's Western Caravan	
September 6	"Smoke! Smoke! Smoke! (That Cigarette)"	Tex Williams's Western Caravan	
September 13	"Smoke! Smoke! Smoke! (That Cigarette)"	Tex Williams's Western Caravan	
September 20	"Smoke! Smoke! Smoke! (That Cigarette)"	Tex Williams's Western Caravan	
September 27	"Smoke! Smoke! Smoke! (That Cigarette)"	Tex Williams's Western Caravan	
October 4	"Smoke! Smoke! Smoke! (That Cigarette)"	Tex Williams's Western Caravan	
October 11	"Smoke! Smoke! Smoke! (That Cigarette)"	Tex Williams's Western Caravan	
October 18	"Smoke! Smoke! Smoke! (That Cigarette)"	Tex Williams's Western Caravan	
October 25	"Smoke! Smoke! Smoke! (That Cigarette)"	Tex Williams's Western Caravan	
November 1	"I'll Hold You in My Heart (Till I Can Hold You in My Arms)"	Eddy Arnold and his Tennessee Plowboys	
November 8	"Smoke! Smoke! Smoke! (That Cigarette)"	Tex Williams's Western Caravan	
November 15	"I'll Hold You in My Heart (Till I Can Hold You in My Arms)"	Eddy Arnold and his Tennessee Plowboys	
November 22	"I'll Hold You in My Heart (Till I Can Hold You in My Arms)"	Eddy Arnold and his Tennessee Plowboys	
November 29	"I'll Hold You in My Heart (Till I Can Hold You in My Arms)"	Eddy Arnold and his Tennessee Plowboys	
December 6	"I'll Hold You in My Heart (Till I Can Hold You in My Arms)"	Eddy Arnold and his Tennessee Plowboys	
December 13	"I'll Hold You in My Heart (Till I Can Hold You in My Arms)"	Eddy Arnold and his Tennessee Plowboys	
December 20	"I'll Hold You in My Heart (Till I Can Hold You in My Arms)"	Eddy Arnold and his Tennessee Plowboys	
December 27	"I'll Hold You in My Heart (Till I Can Hold You in My Arms)"	Eddy Arnold and his Tennessee Plowboys	

== See also ==
- 1947 in music
- 1947 in country music
- List of artists who reached number one on the U.S. country chart
