= 1944 in country music =

This is a list of notable events in country music that took place in the year 1944.

== Events ==
- January 8 – Billboard publishes its first "Most Played Juke Box Folk Records" chart, the first widespread method of tracking the nationwide popularity of current country music songs. The first No. 1 song is "Pistol Packin' Mama" by both Al Dexter and Bing Crosby and The Andrews Sisters. However, from January to August 26, 1944, "Race" records were also included. The September 2, 1944, chart forward is the predecessor to today's Hot Country Songs chart.
- 1944 – Elton Britt received the first gold record for a hillbilly/country music song, 1942's "There's a Star Spangled Banner Waving Somewhere."

== Top hits of the year ==
=== Number one hits ===
from The Billboard's "Most Played Juke Box Folk Records" chart (As certified by Billboard magazine)

US	Single	Artist
January 8 (tie)	"Pistol Packin' Mama"	Al Dexter and His Troopers
January 8 (tie)	"Pistol Packin' Mama"	Bing Crosby and the Andrews Sisters
February 26	"Ration Blues"	Louis Jordan And His Tympany Five
March 11	"Rosalita"	Al Dexter and His Troopers
March 18	"They Took the Stars Out of Heaven"	Floyd Tillman
March 25	"So Long Pal"	Al Dexter and His Troopers
April 1	"Too Late to Worry, Too Blue to Cry"	Al Dexter and His Troopers
June 10	"Straighten Up and Fly Right"	The King Cole Trio
July 29	"Is You Is or Is You Ain't My Baby"	Louis Jordan And His Tympany Five
September 2	"Soldier's Last Letter"	Ernest Tubb
September 23	"Smoke on the Water"	Red Foley
December 23	"I'm Wastin' My Tears on You"	Tex Ritter

== Top Hillbilly-Folk (Country) Recordings 1944 ==
On August 1, 1942, a strike by the American Federation of Musicians ended all recording sessions. Record companies kept business going by releasing recordings from their vaults, but by mid-1943, alternate sources were running dry, as the strike continued. Decca was the first company to settle in September 1943, but RCA Victor and Columbia held on until November 1944. It comes as no surprise that eleven of the top twenty records of 1944 were released by Decca, with two more by Capitol, the second company to settle. The remaining seven were released by Okeh, the label revived in 1940 by CBS to replace Vocalion, now the C&W division of Columbia Records, and apparently unaffected by the strike. Sadly, it would be put to sleep again in 1945, when releases were switched to the parent label.

In response to the growing popularity of Hillbilly (Country) music, The Billboard's "Most Played Juke Box Folk Records" chart, began on January 8, 1944, but for reasons unknown, included "Race" records, despite a chart already existing for those. On September 2, race records were abruptly removed, including the two top records from the prior week. Our chart does not include R&B records, and is also supplemented with record sales information (the new chart only rates jukebox plays) and other factors. As always, numerical rankings are approximate.

Rank	Artist	Title	Label	Recorded	Released	Chart Positions
1	Al Dexter and His Troopers	"So Long Pal"	Okeh 6718	March 18, 1942	February 6, 1944	US Hillbilly 1944 #1, Hillbilly #1 for 21 weeks, 41 total weeks
2	Red Foley	"Smoke on the Water"	Decca 6102	May 4, 1944	June 13, 1944	US Billboard 1944 #49, US Pop #7, US Hillbilly 1944 #2, Hillbilly #1 for 13 weeks, 40 total weeks
3	Ernest Tubb	"Soldier's Last Letter"	Decca 6098	January 13, 1944	May 27, 1944	US Billboard 1944 #125, US Pop #16, US Hillbilly 1944 #3, Hillbilly #1 for 5 weeks, 39 total weeks
4	Al Dexter and His Troopers	"Too Late To Worry, Too Blue To Cry"	Okeh 6718	March 18, 1942	February 6, 1944	US Billboard 1944 #181, US Pop #23, US Hillbilly 1944 #4, Hillbilly #1 for 2 weeks, 45 total weeks
5	Ernest Tubb	"Try Me One More Time"	Decca 6093	July 17, 1942	October 28, 1943	US Billboard 1944 #219, US Pop #22, US Hillbilly 1944 #5, Hillbilly #2 for 1 week, 51 total weeks
6	Tex Ritter and His Texans	"I'm Wastin' My Tears on You"	Capitol 174	November 23, 1943	October 1944	US Billboard 1944 #93, US Pop #12, US Hillbilly 1944 #6, Hillbilly #1 for 6 weeks, 23 total weeks
7	Bob Wills and His Texas Playboys	"You're From Texas"	Okeh 6722	July 15, 1942	August 1944	US Billboard 1944 #105, US Pop #14, US Hillbilly 1944 #7, Hillbilly #2 for 2 weeks, 28 total weeks
8	Tex Ritter and His Texans	"There's a New Moon Over My Shoulder"	Capitol 174	November 23, 1943	October 1944	US Billboard 1944 #226, US Pop #26, US Hillbilly 1944 #8, Hillbilly #2 for 1 weeks, 26 total weeks
9	Gene Autry	"I'm Thinking Tonight Of My Blue Eyes"	Okeh 6648	February 24, 1942	April 1942	US Hillbilly 1944 #9, Hillbilly #2 for 1 week, 34 total weeks
10	Bob Wills and His Texas Playboys	"We Might As Well Forget It"	Okeh 6722	July 14, 1942	August 1944	US Billboard 1944 #89, US Pop #11, US Hillbilly 1944 #10, Hillbilly #2 for 4 weeks, 21 total weeks
11	Ernest Tubb	"Yesterday's Tears"	Decca 6098	January 13, 1944	March 29, 1944	US Billboard 1944 #251, US Pop #29, US Hillbilly 1944 #11, Hillbilly #3 for 1 week, 16 total weeks
12	Foy Willing and His Riders Of The Purple Sage	"Texas Blues"	Capitol 162	March 9, 1944	June 16, 1944	US Hillbilly 1944 #12, Hillbilly #3 for 3 weeks, 19 total weeks
13	Roy Acuff and his Smoky Mountain Boys	"I'll Forgive You But I Can't Forget"	Okeh 6723	June 4, 1942	August 28, 1944	US Billboard 1944 #177, US Pop #22, US Hillbilly 1944 #13, Hillbilly #3 for 1 week, 20 total weeks
14	Texas Jim Lewis and His Lone Star Cowboys	"Too Late to Worry, Too Blue to Cry"	Decca 6099	February 11, 1944	August 1944	US Hillbilly 1944 #14, Hillbilly #3 for 2 weeks, 16 total weeks
15	Hoosier Hot Shots	"She Broke My Heart In Three Places"	Decca 4442	March 23, 1944	May 1944	US Billboard 1944 #224, US Pop #26, US Hillbilly 1944 #15, Hillbilly #3 for 1 week, 13 total weeks
16	Jimmy Wakely	"I'm Sending You Red Roses"	Decca 6095	December 27, 1943	February 3, 1944	US Hillbilly 1944 #16, Hillbilly #3 for 1 week, 15 total weeks
17	Roy Acuff and his Smoky Mountain Boys	"The Prodigal Son"	Okeh 6716	June 1, 1942	December 1943	US Billboard 1944 #173, US Pop #21, US Hillbilly 1944 #17, Hillbilly #4 for 1 week, 20 total weeks
18	Jimmie Davis	"Is It Too Late Now"	Decca 6100	March 23, 1944	April 28, 1944	US Hillbilly 1944 #18, Hillbilly #3 for 1 week, 11 total weeks
19	Ted Daffan's Texans	"Look Who's Talkin'"	Okeh 6719	February 20, 1942	February 1943	US Hillbilly 1944 #19, Hillbilly #4 for 1 weeks, 15 total weeks
20	Floyd Tillman	"Each Night At Nine"	Decca 6104	April 20, 1944	November 20, 1944	US Hillbilly 1944 #20, Hillbilly #4 for 1 week, 21 total weeks
21	Jimmie Davis	"There's A Chill On The Hill Tonight"	Decca 6100	March 23, 1944	April 28, 1944	US Hillbilly 1944 #21, Hillbilly #4 for 1 week, 16 total weeks

== Births ==
- January 26 – Dave Rowland, singer, member of Dave & Sugar (died 2018).
- April 27 – Herb Pedersen, musician, member of The Desert Rose Band.
- June 21 – Kenny O'Dell, singer-songwriter (died 2018).
- July 20 – T. G. Sheppard, pop-styled country performer, one of the most successful stars of the 1970s and 1980s.
- July 30 – Chris Darrow, American musician (Nitty Gritty Dirt Band) (died 2020).
- August 8 – Michael Johnson, pop singer with a string of country hits in the 1980s (died 2017).
- August 19 – Eddy Raven, singer-songwriter, successfully fuses elements of cajun music with contemporary country sounds.
- October 31 – Kinky Friedman, Jewish American country singer-songwriter, satirist and political candidate (died 2024).
- December 4 – Chris Hillman, ex-member of The Byrds, forms 1980s country-rock band The Desert Rose Band.
- December 11 – Brenda Lee, "Little Miss Dynamite", pop-rockabilly singer, moves to country music in late 1960s.

== See also ==
- List of Most Played Juke Box Folk Records number ones of 1944
