= 1947 in country music =

This is a list of notable events in country music that took place in 1947.

== Top hits of the year ==
=== Number one hits ===
(As certified by Billboard magazine)

US	Single	Artist
January 18	"Rainbow at Midnight"	Ernest Tubb
February 8	"So Round, So Firm, So Fully Packed"	Merle Travis
May 17	"New Jolie Blonde (New Pretty Blonde)"	Red Foley and the Cumberland Valley Boys
May 24	"What is Life Without Love"	Eddy Arnold
June 7	"Sugar Moon"	Bob Wills and His Texas Playboys
June 1	"It's a Sin"	Eddy Arnold
July 19	"Smoke! Smoke! Smoke! (That Cigarette)"	Tex Williams
Nov 1	"I'll Hold You in My Heart (Till I Can Hold You in My Arms)"	Eddy Arnold

== Top Hillbilly (Country) Recordings 1947 ==
Here is a year-end list compiled from The Billboard's Most-Played Folk Records weekly chart of 1947. Records that enter the chart in December of the previous year, or remain on the chart after December of the current year, receive points for their full chart runs. Each week, a score of 15 points is assigned for the no. 1 record, 9 points for no. 2, 8 points for no. 3, and so on, and the total of all weeks determined the final rank.

Rank	Artist	Title	Label	Recorded	Released	Chart Positions
1	Eddy Arnold and his Tennessee Plowboys	"I'll Hold You in My Heart (Till I Can Hold You in My Arms)"	RCA Victor 20-2332	May 18, 1947	July 10, 1947	US Billboard 1947 #134, US #22 for 1 week, 3 total weeks, US Hillbilly 1947 #1, USHB #1 for 21 weeks, 46 total weeks
2	Eddy Arnold and his Tennessee Plowboys	"It's a Sin"	RCA Victor 2241	September 24, 1946	April 21, 1947	US Billboard 1947 #188, US #14, US Hillbilly 1947 #2, USHB #1 for 5 weeks, 38 total weeks
3	Tex Williams and The Western Caravan	"Smoke! Smoke! Smoke! (That Cigarette)"	Capitol 40001	March 27, 1947	May 10, 1947	US Billboard 1947 #6, US #1 for 6 weeks, 17 total weeks, US Hillbilly 1947 #3, USHB #1 for 16 weeks, 23 total weeks
4	Merle Travis	"So Round, So Firm, So Fully Packed"	Capitol 349	October 19, 1946	January 23, 1947	US Billboard 1947 #161, US #12, US Hillbilly 1947 #4, USHB #1 for 14 weeks, 22 total weeks
5	Eddy Arnold and his Tennessee Plowboys	"What Is Life Without Love"	RCA Victor 20-2058	March 20, 1946	December 10, 1946	US Hillbilly 1947 #5, USHB #1 for 1 week, 22 total weeks
6	Ernest Tubb	"Rainbow at Midnight"	Decca 46018	September 17, 1947	October 1947	US Hillbilly 1947 #6, USHB #1 for 2 weeks, 20 total weeks
7	Red Ingle and The Natural Seven vocal by Cinderella G Stump	"Temptation (Tim-Tayshun)"	Capitol 412	March 14, 1947	May 1947	US Billboard 1947 #15, US #1 for 1 week, 15 total weeks, US Hillbilly 1947 #7, USHB #2 for 11 weeks, 18 total weeks
8	Red Foley and the Cumberland Valley Boys	"New Jolie Blonde (New Pretty Blonde)"	Decca 46034	January 9, 1947	March 22, 1947	US Hillbilly 1947 #8, USHB #1 for 5 weeks, 15 total weeks
9	Moon Mullican and The Showboys	"New Pretty Blonde (Jole Blon)"	King 578	October 2, 1946	December 1946	US Billboard 1947 #320, US #21 for 1 week, 1 total weeks, US Hillbilly 1947 #9, USHB #1 for 3 weeks, 15 total weeks
10	Tex Williams and His Western Caravan	"Never Trust A Woman"	Capitol Americana 40054	November 13, 1945	January 1947	US BB 1947 #178, US #26, US Hillbilly 1947 #10, USHB #2 for 1 week, 22 total weeks
11	Eddy Arnold and his Tennessee Plowboys	"To My Sorrow"	RCA Victor 2481	September 17, 1947	September 29, 1947	US Hillbilly 1947 #11, USHB #2 for 4 weeks, 21 total weeks
12	Red Foley and the Cumberland Valley Boys	"Never Trust A Woman"	Decca 46074	March 18, 1947	May 12, 1947	US BB 1947 #226, US #16, US Hillbilly 1947 #13, USHB #2 for 4 weeks, 14 total weeks
13	Bob Wills and His Texas Playboys	"Sugar Moon"	Columbia 37113	September 5, 1946	March 23, 1947	US Hillbilly 1947 #15, USHB #3 for 8 weeks, 24 total weeks
14	Tex Williams and The Western Caravan	"That's What I Like About the West"	Capitol Americana 40031	January 24, 1947	October 14, 1947	US Hillbilly 1947 #17, USHB #2 for 2 weeks, 13 total weeks
15	Al Dexter and His Troopers	"Down At The Roadside Inn"	Columbia 37303	April 4, 1945	January 1947	US Hillbilly 1947 #22, USHB #2 for 1 week, 15 total weeks
16	Dorothy Shay	"Feudin' And Fightin'"	Columbia 37189	July 24, 1945	February 18, 1947	US Billboard 1947 #125, US #4 for 1 week, 11 total weeks, US Hillbilly 1947 #20, USHB #3 for 1 weeks, 22 total weeks
17	Roy Acuff and His Smoky Mountain Boys	"(Our Own) Jole Blon"	Columbia 37287	January 28, 1947	March 1947	US Hillbilly 1947 #14, USHB #4 for 4 weeks, 6 total weeks
18	Ernest Tubb	"Don't Look Now (But Your Broken Heart Is Showing)"	Decca 46040	February 10, 1947	April 1947	US Hillbilly 1947 #4, USHB #1 for 2 weeks, 20 total weeks
19	Johnny Bond and His Red River Valley Boys	"So Round, So Firm, So Fully Packed"	Columbia 37255	November 1, 1946	September 2, 1947	US Hillbilly 1947 #14, USHB #5 for 1 week, 14 total weeks
20	Merle Travis	"Three Times Seven"	Capitol 384	March 18, 1947	May 12, 1947	US BB 1947 #226, US #16, US Hillbilly 1947 #19, USHB #3 for 3 weeks, 15 total weeks
21	Jack Guthrie and His Oklahomans	"Oakie Boogie"	Columbia 36935	January 3, 1947	February 18, 1947	US Hillbilly 1947 #15, USHB #2 for 1 weeks, 18 total weeks
22	Hank Williams with His Drifting Cowboys	"Move It On Over"	MGM 10033	April 21, 1947	June 1947	US Hillbilly 1947 #22, USHB #4 for 1 week, 3 total weeks
23	Merle Travis	"Steel Guitar Rag"	Capitol 384	March 18, 1947	May 12, 1947	US BB 1947 #226, US #16, US Hillbilly 1947 #23, USHB #4 for 2 weeks, 3 total weeks
44	Gene Autry	"Here Comes Santa Claus (Right Down Santa Claus Lane)"	Columbia 37942	August 28, 1947	October 6, 1947	US Billboard 1947 #87, US #9 for 1 week, 2 total weeks, US Hillbilly 1947 #44, USHB #5 for 1 week, 1 total weeks
52	Louise Massey and the Westerners	"My Adobe Hacienda"	Columbia 37332	January 27, 1941	April 21, 1947	US BB 1947 #201, US #16, US Hillbilly 1947 #52, USHB #5 for 1 week, 1 total weeks

== Births ==
- April 2 – Emmylou Harris, country-rock and alternative country-styled singer who enjoyed mainstream success during the 1970s and 1980s.
- May 24 – Mike Reid, football player-turned-singer-songwriter during the 1980s.
- July 22 – Don Henley, member of the country-rock group Eagles.
- September 16 – Sonny LeMaire, member of the 1980s group Exile.
- September 26 – Lynn Anderson, top female country singer of the 1970s; best-remembered for her crossover pop smash, "(I Never Promised You a) Rose Garden" (died 2015).
- November 10 – Dave Loggins, singer-songwriter who wrote a number of successful country songs during the 1980s.
- December 19 – Janie Fricke, 1970s session/backup singer who grew to individual stardom during the early and mid-1980s.
