= List of Most Played Juke Box Folk Records number ones of 1944 =

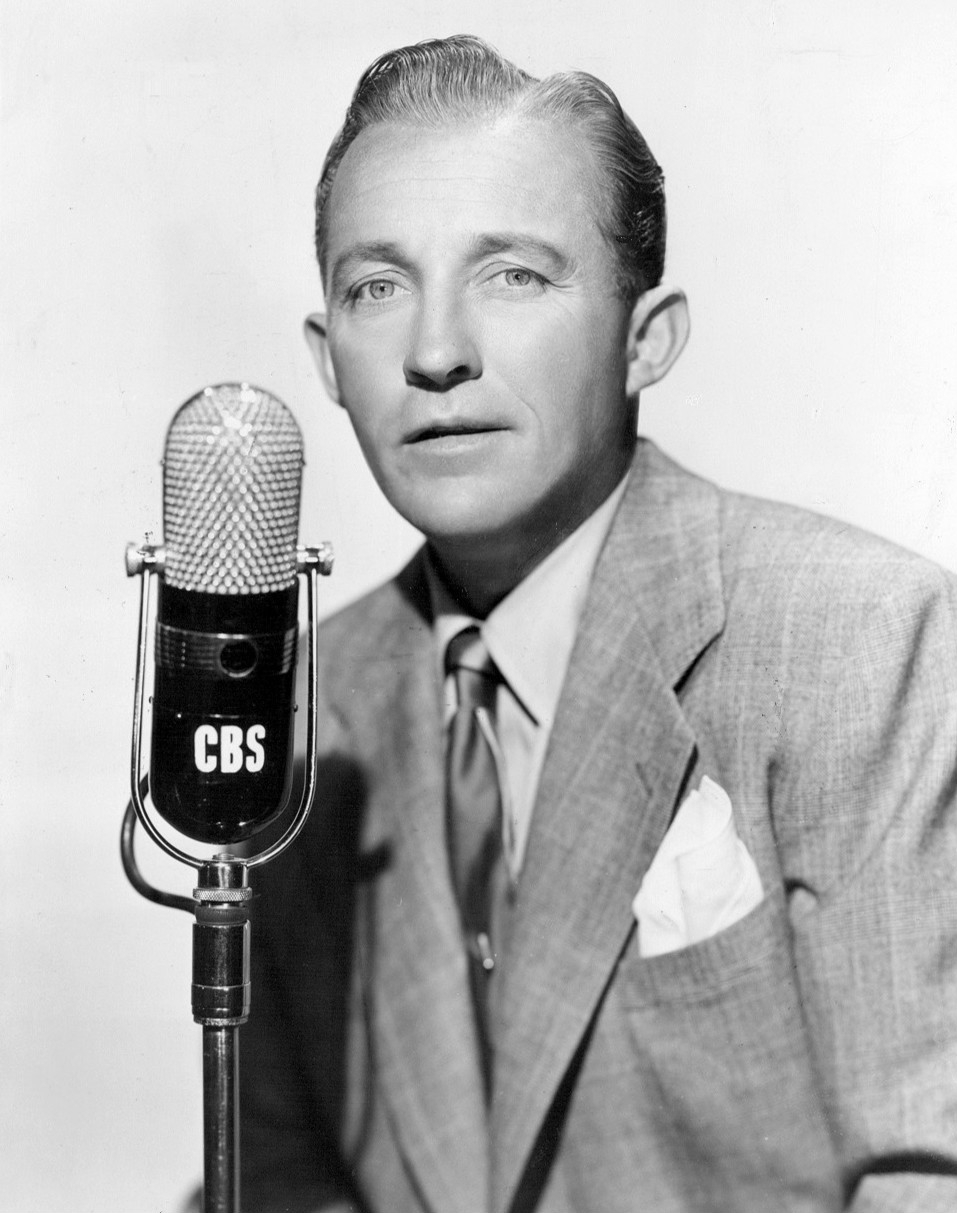
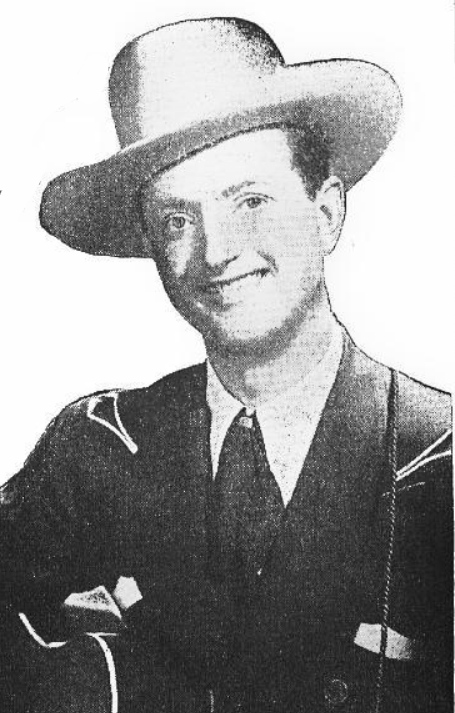
Bing Crosby (left) and Al Dexter were among the artists whose versions of "Pistol Packin' Mama" were listed in the number one spot.

In 1944, Billboard magazine published its first chart ranking the top-performing country music songs in the United States, under the title Most Played Juke Box Folk Records. The term "country music" would not come into standard usage until the late 1940s and "folk music" was one of a number of terms used for the genre in earlier years; the subtitle on the first chart indicated that it covered "Hillbillies, Spirituals, Cowboy Songs, etc". The Juke Box Folk listing was compiled based on reports from "Billboard representatives" detailing the most-played songs of the genre in jukeboxes from "all the country's leading operating centers", which were averaged to give an overall chart. The first chart listed six songs, but the number of entries was not consistent from week to week. The juke box chart was published under a number of different titles until 1957 and is considered part of the lineage of the current Hot Country Songs chart, which was first published in 1958.

The first number-one song listed was "Pistol Packin' Mama", which remained in the top spot for the first seven weeks. The song, originally recorded by Al Dexter in 1942, had remained hugely popular ever since, and been recorded by many different singers. Up to four different versions of "Pistol Packin' Mama" were bracketed together as a single entry in the number one position during the seven-week run, although noted chart historian Joel Whitburn regarded only the first-named artist each week as having achieved the number one hit, and did not record some of the credited artists as having charted at all. Subsequently, different recordings of a song were not bracketed together in this way: in issues of Billboard published later in the year, different versions of "Pistol Packin' Mama" appeared listed separately. The chart methodology also allowed for the possibility of records tying for a position, and on several occasions during 1944 two or more different songs tied for the number-one spot.

Counting all seven weeks in which his version of "Pistol Packin' Mama" was bracketed with other artists' recordings of the same song and counting each of his two songs which tied for the top spot in the issue of Billboard dated April 15 as having one week at number one, Al Dexter spent the highest number of weeks at the top of the chart in 1944, with 24. If the first five weeks of the chart, for which Whitburn did not give Dexter credit as having achieved a number one, are discounted, he nonetheless still had the most weeks in the top spot. Dexter was also the artist with the most different songs at number one in 1944, topping the chart with "Pistol Packin' Mama", "Rosalita", "Too Late to Worry" and "So Long Pal". Louis Jordan was the only other artist to top the chart with more than one song during the year. Red Foley had the longest unbroken run at number one, spending thirteen consecutive weeks in the top spot in the fall with the patriotic wartime song "Smoke on the Water". Al Dexter's "So Long Pal" spent the same number of weeks at number one, but split across seven different spells at the top. The final number one of the year was "I'm Wastin' My Tears on You" by Tex Ritter, who is one of three acts to top the chart in 1944 who are members of the Country Music Hall of Fame, the others being Ernest Tubb and Red Foley.

== Chart history ==
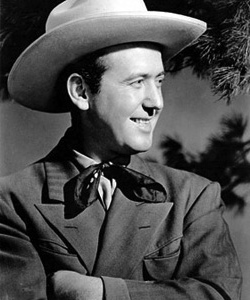
Red Foley's song "Smoke on the Water" spent 13 weeks at number one.

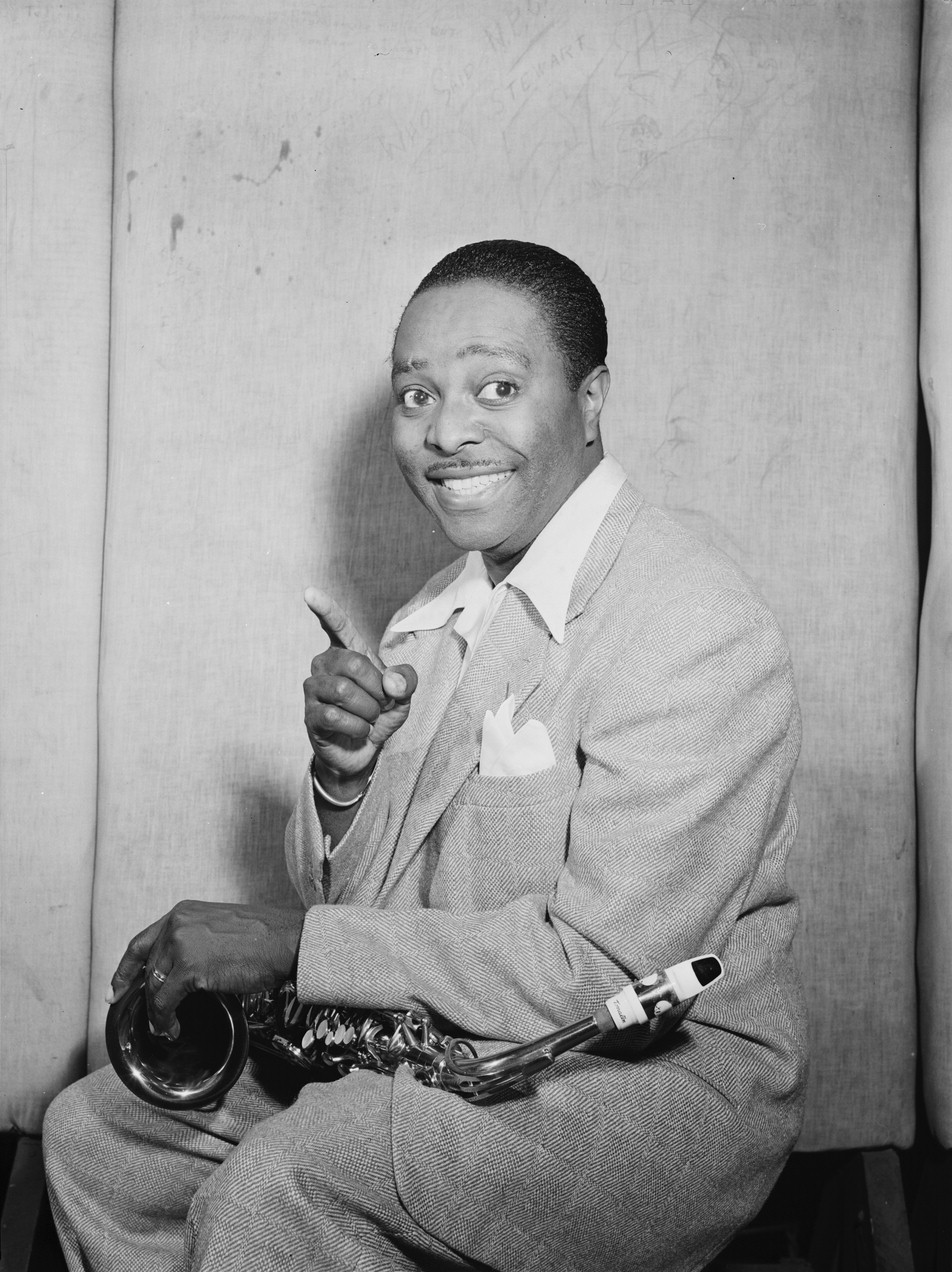
Louis Jordan was the first artist to top the chart with a song other than "Pistol Packin' Mama".

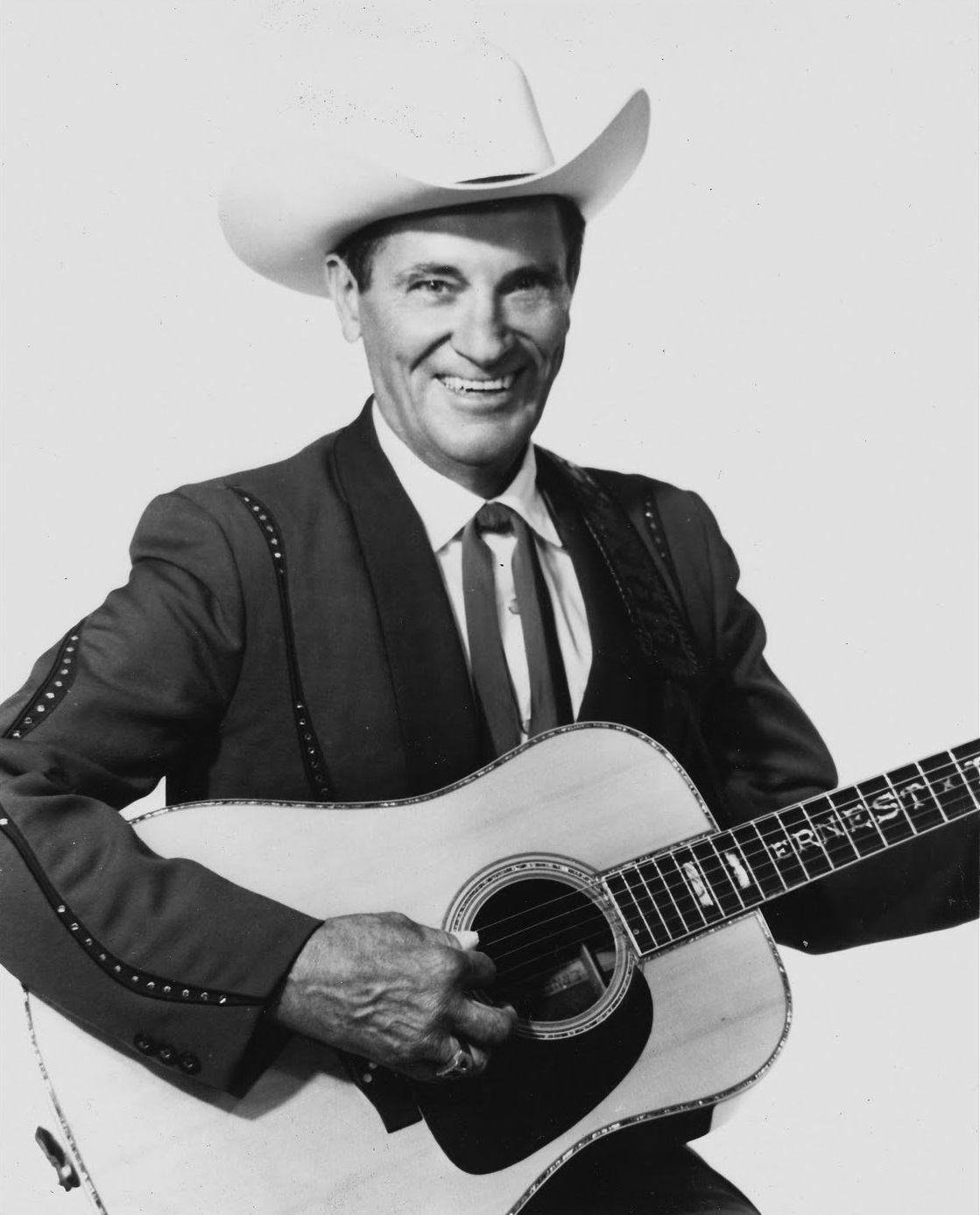
"Texas Troubadour" Ernest Tubb had his first number-one hit in the fall.

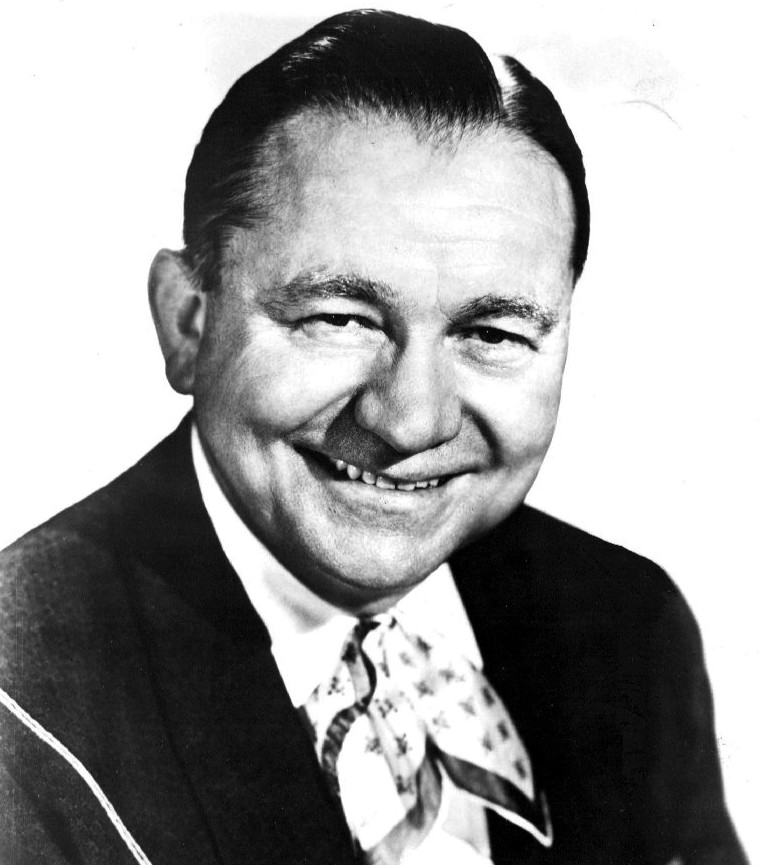
Singer/actor Tex Ritter ended the year at number one.

Issue date	Title	Artist(s)	Ref.
January 8	"Pistol Packin' Mama"	Bing Crosby & The Andrews Sisters / Al Dexter / Don Baxter^{[a]}	
January 15	"Pistol Packin' Mama"	Bing Crosby & The Andrews Sisters / Al Dexter / Don Baxter / Sid Peltyn^{[a]}	
January 22	"Pistol Packin' Mama"	Bing Crosby & The Andrews Sisters / Al Dexter^{[a]}	
January 29	"Pistol Packin' Mama"	Bing Crosby & The Andrews Sisters / Al Dexter^{[a]}	
February 5	"Pistol Packin' Mama"	Bing Crosby & The Andrews Sisters / Al Dexter / Freddie "Schnickelfritz" Fisher^{[a]}	
February 12	"Pistol Packin' Mama"	Al Dexter / Bing Crosby & The Andrews Sisters^{[a]}	
February 19	"Pistol Packin' Mama"	Al Dexter / Bing Crosby & The Andrews Sisters^{[a]}	
February 26	"Ration Blues"	Louis Jordan	
March 4	"Ration Blues"	Louis Jordan	
March 11^{[b]}	"Pistol Packin' Mama"	Bing Crosby & The Andrews Sisters	
March 11^{[b]}	"Rosalita"	Al Dexter	
March 18	"They Took the Stars Out of Heaven"	Floyd Tillman	
March 25	"So Long Pal"	Al Dexter	
April 1	"Too Late to Worry"	Al Dexter	
April 8	"So Long Pal"	Al Dexter	
April 15^{[b]}	"So Long Pal"	Al Dexter	
April 15^{[b]}	"Too Late to Worry"	Al Dexter	
April 15^{[b]}	"Ration Blues"	Louis Jordan	
April 22	"So Long Pal"	Al Dexter	
April 29	"Too Late to Worry"	Al Dexter	
May 6	"So Long Pal"	Al Dexter	
May 13	"So Long Pal"	Al Dexter	
May 20	"So Long Pal"	Al Dexter	
May 27	"So Long Pal"	Al Dexter	
June 3	"So Long Pal"	Al Dexter	
June 10^{[b]}	"So Long Pal"	Al Dexter	
June 10^{[b]}	"Straighten Up and Fly Right"	The King Cole Trio	
June 17	"Straighten Up and Fly Right"	The King Cole Trio	
June 24	"Straighten Up and Fly Right"	The King Cole Trio	
July 1	"So Long Pal"	Al Dexter	
July 8	"Straighten Up and Fly Right"	The King Cole Trio	
July 15^{[b]}	"Straighten Up and Fly Right"	The King Cole Trio	
July 15^{[b]}	"So Long Pal"	Al Dexter	
July 22	"Straighten Up and Fly Right"	The King Cole Trio	
July 29	"Is You Is or Is You Ain't My Baby"	Louis Jordan	
August 5	"Is You Is or Is You Ain't My Baby"	Louis Jordan	
August 12	"Is You Is or Is You Ain't My Baby"	Louis Jordan	
August 19	"Is You Is or Is You Ain't My Baby"	Louis Jordan	
August 26	"Is You Is or Is You Ain't My Baby"	Louis Jordan	
September 2	"Soldier's Last Letter"	Ernest Tubb	
September 9	"Soldier's Last Letter"	Ernest Tubb	
September 16	"Soldier's Last Letter"	Ernest Tubb	
September 23^{[b]}	"Soldier's Last Letter"	Ernest Tubb	
September 23^{[b]}	"So Long Pal"	Al Dexter	
September 23^{[b]}	"Smoke on the Water"	Red Foley	
September 30	"Smoke on the Water"	Red Foley	
October 7	"Smoke on the Water"	Red Foley	
October 14	"Smoke on the Water"	Red Foley	
October 21	"Smoke on the Water"	Red Foley	
October 28	"Smoke on the Water"	Red Foley	
November 4	"Smoke on the Water"	Red Foley	
November 11	"Smoke on the Water"	Red Foley	
November 18	"Smoke on the Water"	Red Foley	
November 25	"Smoke on the Water"	Red Foley	
December 2	"Smoke on the Water"	Red Foley	
December 9	"Smoke on the Water"	Red Foley	
December 16	"Smoke on the Water"	Red Foley	
December 23	"I'm Wastin' My Tears on You"	Tex Ritter	
December 30	"I'm Wastin' My Tears on You"	Tex Ritter	

a. Multiple recordings of the same song were listed together. Joel Whitburn regarded only the first act listed as having been number one in the week in question, and his reference works do not list Baxter, Peltyn and Fisher's versions as having charted at all.
b. Multiple songs tied for the number one position.

== See also ==
- 1944 in music
- 1944 in country music
- List of artists who reached number one on the U.S. country chart
