= 1943 in country music =

This is a list of notable events in country music that took place in the year 1943.

== Events ==
- September – Decca Records is the first label to come to terms with the American Federation of Musicians, which had been on strike since August 1942 over music royalties. The first song that was released was "Pistol Packin' Mama" by Bing Crosby and the Andrews Sisters.
- October – Pistol Packin' Mama by Al Dexter goes where no "Hillbilly" record has ever gone, to the top of the National Best Selling Retail Records chart, on October 30. Dexter's publishing company sued "The Hit Parade" radio show for ignoring their record!
- Mother Maybelle Carter reformed the Carter Family. This time, she was joined by daughters Anita, June and Helen.

== Top Hillbilly-Folk (Country) Recordings 1943 ==
1941 was a great year for the United States recording industry, as bad memories of the Depression-tainted 1930s were replaced by record-setting sales. Then came Pearl Harbor, and on August 1, 1942, a strike by the American Federation of Musicians, which ended all recording sessions. Record companies kept business going by releasing promising recordings from their vaults, but by mid-1943, alternate sources were running dry, as the strike continued. Decca was the first company to settle with the union in September, but year-end statistics showed a 50% drop in charted records from 1942. Scan down the "recorded"(date) column, you won't see 1943 very often.

"Pistol Packin' Mama" by Al Dexter was easily the top record of the year, becoming the first #1 Hillbilly-Folk record to cross over and reach #1 on the Popular Chart as well. 1943 featured two of the greatest double-sided Country records ever, "PPM/Rosalita" by Dexter, and the close runner-up, "No Letter Today / Born To Lose" by Ted Daffan, also a top ten crossover hit. Both records stayed on the Hillbilly-Folk chart for over a year, and all four sides made the Popular chart too.

The Top Hillbilly-Folk Records of the Year chart is, like 1942, mostly derived from The Billboard's weekly "American Folk Records" columns of 1943, with raw reports from nationwide jukebox operators, and summaries of the top records in the nation. Supplemental information came from 'Joel Whitburn's Pop Memories 1890-1954', record sales reported on the "Discography of American Historical Recordings" website, and other sources as specified. As always, numerical rankings are approximate.

Rank	Artist	Title	Label	Recorded	Released	Chart Positions
1	Al Dexter and His Troopers	"Pistol Packin' Mama"	Okeh 6708	March 20, 1942	April 10, 1943	US Billboard 1943 #9, US Pop #1 for 1 week, 36 total weeks, US Hillbilly 1943 #1, Hillbilly #1 for 27 weeks, 50 total weeks, 2,500,000 sales, Grammy Hall of Fame in 2000
2	Ted Daffan's Texans	"No Letter Today"	Okeh 6706	February 20, 1942	February 1943	US Billboard 1943 #64, US Pop #13 for 1 week, 20 total weeks, US Hillbilly 1943 #2, Hillbilly #1 for 6 weeks, 53 total weeks, 1,000,000 sales
3	Al Dexter and His Troopers	"Rosalita"	Okeh 6708	March 18, 1942	April 10, 1943	US Billboard 1943 #178, US Pop #22 for 1 week, 47 total weeks, US Hillbilly 1943 #3, Hillbilly #1 for 2 weeks, 58 total weeks
4	Ted Daffan's Texans	"Born To Lose"	Okeh 6706	February 20, 1942	February 1943	US Billboard 1943 #124, US Pop #19 for 1 week, 1 total weeks, US Hillbilly 1943 #4, Hillbilly #2 for 6 weeks, 72 total weeks, 1,000,000 sales
5	Bing Crosby and the Andrews Sisters	"Pistol Packin' Mama"	Decca 23277	September 27, 1943	October 14, 1943	US Billboard 1943 #22, US Pop #2 for 4 weeks, 14 total weeks, US Hillbilly 1943 #5, Hillbilly #1 for 12 weeks, 25 total weeks
6	Louise Massey and the Westerners	"Honey Song"	Okeh 6687	January 26, 1941	August 15, 1942	US Billboard 1943 #123, US Pop #19 for 1 week, 2 total weeks, US Hillbilly 1943 #6, Hillbilly #1 for 3 weeks, 61 total weeks
7	Bob Wills and His Texas Playboys	"New San Antonio Rose"	Okeh 6274	April 16, 1940	July 1942	US Billboard 1943 #127, US Pop #19 for 1 week, 1 total weeks, US Hillbilly 1943 #7, Hillbilly #2 for 1 week, 56 total weeks
8	Carson Robison	"That Old Grey Mare Is Back Where She Used to Be"	Bluebird 30-0808	July 17, 1942	January 8, 1943	US Billboard 1943 #128, US Pop #19 for 1 week, 1 total weeks, US Hillbilly 1943 #8, Hillbilly #1 for 3 weeks, 31 total weeks
9	Floyd Tillman	"They Took the Stars Out of Heaven"	Decca 6090	April 30, 1941	May 25, 1943	US Hillbilly 1943 #9, Hillbilly #1 for 2 weeks, 35 total weeks
10	Bob Wills and His Texas Playboys	"Home in San Antone"	Okeh 6710	July 14, 1942	November 30, 1942	US Billboard 1943 #160, US Pop #21 for 1 week, 1 total weeks, US Hillbilly 1943 #10, Hillbilly #1 for 3 weeks, 36 total weeks
11	Bob Atcher and Bonnie Blue Eyes	"Pins and Needles (In My Heart)"	Okeh 6689	May 5, 1942	July 1942	US Billboard 1943 #132, US Pop #19 for 1 week, 47 total weeks, US Hillbilly 1943 #11, Hillbilly #2 for 1 week, 60 total weeks
12	Roy Acuff and his Smoky Mountain Boys	"Night Train to Memphis"	Okeh 6693	May 28, 1942	September 14, 1942	US Hillbilly 1943 #12, Hillbilly #4 for 1 week, 51 total weeks
13	Gene Autry	"I Hang My Head And Cry"	Okeh 6627	December 13, 1941	March 27, 1942	US Hillbilly 1943 #13, Hillbilly #4 for 1 week, 34 total weeks
14	Ernest Tubb	"You Nearly Lose Your Mind"	Decca 6067	July 17, 1942	August 17, 1942	US Hillbilly 1943 #14, Hillbilly #2 for 1 week, 38 total weeks
15	Gene Autry	"It Makes No Difference Now"	Okeh 6274	June 18, 1941	July 1941	US Hillbilly 1943 #15, Hillbilly #3 for 2 weeks, 33 total weeks
16	Jimmie Davis	"Columbus Stockade Blues"	Decca 6083	July 27, 1942	March 18, 1943	US Hillbilly 1943 #16, Hillbilly #2 for 1 week, 23 total weeks
17	Ernest Tubb	"I Hate To See You Go"	Decca 6684	November 17, 1941	March 11, 1943	US Hillbilly 1943 #17, Hillbilly #4 for 1 week, 18 total weeks
18	Elton Britt	"Buddy Boy"	Bluebird 9023	March 19, 1942	July 24, 1942	US Hillbilly 1943 #18, Hillbilly #3 for 2 weeks, 33 total weeks
19	Dick Kuhn Orchestra	"Put Your Arms Around Me Honey"	Decca 4337	November 26, 1941	October 1943	US Billboard 1943 #45, US Pop #8 for 1 week, 12 total weeks, US Hillbilly 1943 #19, Hillbilly #2 for 1 week, 11 total weeks
20	Ernest Tubb	"I'll Get Along Somehow"	Decca 5825	November 29, 1940	December 29, 1940	US Hillbilly 1943 #20, Hillbilly #4 for 2 weeks, 26 total weeks

Because of the lack of fresh material, many hits from past years made chart returns.

"Wabash Cannonball 1939"	Roy Acuff and his Smoky Mountain Boys
"New San Antonio Rose 1940"	Bob Wills and His Texas Playboys
"Back In the Saddle Again 1939"	Gene Autry
"It Makes No Difference Now 1941"	Gene Autry
"I'm Knocking At Your Door Again 1941"	Jimmie Davis
"Sitting on Top of the World 1936"	Bob Wills and His Texas Playboys
"Sitting on Top of the World 1935"	Shelton Brothers
"The Precious Jewel 1941"	Roy Acuff and his Smoky Mountain Boys

== Births ==
- February 4 – Jimmy Johnson, American musician (Muscle Shoals Rhythm Section) and record producer (died 2019).
- April 23 – Richard Sterban, member of the country-gospel group The Oak Ridge Boys (he's the bass).
- April 29 – Duane Allen, member of the country-gospel group The Oak Ridge Boys (he's the second tenor).
- October 11 – Gene Watson, honky tonk-styled vocalist of the 1970s and 1980s.
