= Billboard Most-Played Folk Records of 1946 =

Year-end chart compiled Billboard magazine ranking the year's top folk records

The Billboard Most-Played Folk Records of 1946 is a year-end chart compiled Billboard magazine ranking the year's top folk records based on the number of times the record was played on the nation's juke boxes. In 1946, country music records were included on, and dominated, the Billboard folk records chart.

Gene Autry, Al Dexter, and Bob Wills led the way with four records each on the year-end list. Merle Travis and Ernest Tubb followed with three apiece.

The song "Sioux City Sue" was included on the list three times, with records by Zeke Manners, the Hoosier Hot Shots, and Dick Thomas. In addition, Bing Crosby had a version that ranked No. 34 on the year-end pop chart.

Columbia led all labels with 16 records on the year-end chart. Capitol, Victor, and Decca followed with five records each.

| Juke box year-end | Peak (Note: This column recites the record's peak position on Billboard's weekly charts.) | Title | Artist(s) | Label |
|---|---|---|---|---|
| 1 | 1 | New Spanish Two Step | Bob Wills | Columbia |
| 2 | 1 | Guitar Polka | Al Dexter | Columbia |
| 3 | 1 | Divorce Me C.O.D. | Merle Travis | Capitol |
| 4 | 3 | Roly Poly | Bob Wills | Columbia |
| 5 | 2 | Sioux City Sue | Zeke Manners | Victor |
| 6 | 1 | Wine, Women and Song | Al Dexter | Columbia |
| 7 | 2 | Someday (You'll Want Me to Want You) | Elton Britt | Victor |
| 8 | 2 | Cincinnati Lou | Merle Travis | Capitol |
| 9 | 2 | Sioux City Sue | Hoosier Hot Shots | Decca |
| 10 | 2 | That's How Much I Love You | Eddy Arnold | Victor |
| 11 | 1 | Sioux City Sue | Dick Thomas | National |
| 12 | 2 | Honey, Do You Think I'm Wrong | Al Dexter | Columbia |
| 13 | 3 | I Wish I Had Never Met Sunshine | Gene Autry | Columbia |
| 14 | 2 | Detour | Spade Cooley | Columbia |
| 15 | 3 | No Vacancy | Merle Travis | Capitol |
| 16 | 5 | Drivin' Nails in My Coffin | Floyd Tillman | Columbia |
| 16 | 3 | Have I Told You Lately That I Love You? | Gene Autry | Columbia |
| 16 | 1 | Rainbow at Midnight | Ernest Tubb | Decca |
| 19 | 3 | You Can't Break My Heart | Spade Cooley | Columbia |
| 19 | 2 | Filipino Baby | Ernest Tubb | Decca |
| 21 | 3 | Someday (You'll Want Me to Want You) | Hoosier Hot Shots | Decca |
| 22 | 3 | Wave to Me, My Lady | Elton Britt | Victor |
| 23 | 1 | Silver Dew on the Blue Grass Tonight | Bob Wills | Columbia |
| 23 | 4 | Wave to Me, My Lady | Gene Autry | Columbia |
| 23 | 3 | When You Leave, Don't Slam the Door | Tex Ritter | Capitol |
| 26 | 1 | It's Been So Long Darling | Ernest Tubb | Decca |
| 27 | 4 | Silver Spurs (On the Golden Stairs) | Gene Autry | Columbia |
| 28 | 2 | Stay a Little Longer | Bob Wills | Columbia |
| 29 | 3 | Kentucky Waltz | Bill Monroe | Columbia |
| 30 | 1 | You Will Have to Pay | Tex Ritter | Capitol |
| 30 | 3 | Guitar Polka | Rosalie Allen | Victor |
| 30 | 3 | It's Up to You | Al Dexter | Columbia |
| 30 | 2 | Freight Train Boogie | Delmore Brothers | King |

== See also ==
- Billboard year-end top pop singles of 1946
- Billboard Most-Played Race Records of 1946
- 1946 in country music
