= You Can't Break My Heart =

1946 single by Spade Cooley

Single by Spade Cooley
- Released: 1946
- Genre: Country
- Label: Columbia
- Songwriter(s): Spade Cooley, Smokey Rogers

"You Can't Break My Heart" is a country music song written by Spade Cooley and Smokey Rogers, performed by Spade Cooley and His Orchestra (vocal by Tex Williams), and released on the Columbia label (catalog no. 36935). In April 1946, it reached No. 3 on the Billboard folk chart. It was also ranked as the No. 19 record in Billboard's 1946 year-end folk juke box chart.

The song was also covered by Roy Rogers, Tex Ritter, and others.

== See also ==
- Billboard Most-Played Folk Records of 1946
