= Never Trust a Woman =

Never Trust a Woman may refer to:

- Never Trust a Woman (film), a 1930 German musical film
- Never Trust a Woman (song), a 1947 single by Tex Williams and His Western Caravan
