= Silver Spurs =

Silver Spurs may refer to:

- Texas Silver Spurs, an honorary male service organization at The University of Texas at Austin.
- Silver Spurs (1922 film), a 1922 American silent western film
- Silver Spurs (1936 film), a 1936 American western film
- Silver Spurs (1943 film), a 1943 American film
- "Silver Spurs (On the Golden Stairs)", a 1946 song from Gene Autry
