= The California Polka =

Single by Tex Williams and His Western Caravan
- B-side: "Rose of the Alamo"
- Released: 1946
- Genre: Western swing, polka
- Label: Capitol
- Songwriter: Dale Fitzsimmons

"The California Polka" is a song written by Dale Fitzsimmons and popularized by Tex Williams and His Western Caravan. It was released on Capitol Records in 1946 with "Rose of the Alamo" as the "B" side. It peaked in November 1945 at No. 4 on the Billboard folk chart. It was Williams' first entry on the chart, followed in 1947 by the No. 1 hit, "Smoke! Smoke! Smoke! (That Cigarette)". Capitalizing on the popularity of polka in the postwar years, Williams also had a hit with "Banjo Polka" in 1948 and also recorded "Roundup Polka", "Big Bass Polka", "Cowboy Polka", "Happy Birthday Polka", "Big Hat Polka", and "Johnstown Polka".

The song was also covered by Spade Cooley, "Whoopee" John Wilfahrt and His Orchestra (Decca 45057A), and Bill Gale and his Globe Trotters (Columbia 12304-F).

The song was included in multiple Tex Williams compilation albums, including "That's What I Like About the West" (2002), "I Got Texas in My Soul: A Centenary Tribute, His 20 Finest 1944-1954" (2017), and "The Capitol Years 1946-51" (2019).
