= Banjo Polka =

Single by Tex Williams and His Western Caravan
- B-side: "Pretty Red Lights"
- Released: 1948
- Genre: Western swing, polka
- Length: 1:31
- Label: Capitol
- Songwriters: Andrew Soldi, Pedro de Paul

"Banjo Polka" is a song written by Andrew Soldi and Pedro de Paul and popularized by Tex Williams and His Western Caravan. It was released on Capitol Records in 1948 with "Pretty Red Lights" as the "B" side. It peaked in June 1948 at No. 5 on the Billboard folk chart. It remained on the chart for 15 weeks, Williams' longest stay on the chart since his 1947 hit "Never Trust a Woman".

The song features rapid banjo play with lyrics that refer to playing the banjo loud while dancing the polka, rocking the room as the rafters tilt..

It was Williams' second polka hit following "The California Polka" in 1946 Capitalizing on the popularity of polka in the postwar years, Williams also recorded "Roundup Polka", "Big Bass Polka", "Cowboy Polka", "Happy Birthday Polka", "Big Hat Polka", and "Johnstown Polka".

"Banjo Polka" was also covered by "Whoopee" John Wilfahrt And His Orchestra (Decca 9-29714). and The Tune Toppers (Sound Recording Company).

Williams' version of "Banjo Polka" was included on the compilations, "I Got Texas in My Soul: A Centenary Tribute, His 20 Finest 1944-1954" (2017) and "The Capitol Years 1946-51" (2019).
