= There's a New Moon over My Shoulder =

1944 song by Jimmie Davis, Ekko Whelan, Lee Blastic

Single by Tex Ritter and His Texans
- Language: English
- B-side: "I'm Wastin' My Tears on You"
- Released: October 1944
- Recorded: November 23, 1943
- Genre: Country
- Length: 2:56
- Label: Capitol 174
- Songwriters: Jimmie Davis, Ekko Whelan, Lee Blastic

Tex Ritter and His Texans singles chronology
"Have I Stayed Away Too Long" (1944)	"There's a New Moon over My Shoulder" (1944)	"Jealous Heart" (1944)

"There's a New Moon over My Shoulder" is a 1944 song written by Jimmie Davis, Ekko Whelan, and Lee Blastic and made popular by Tex Ritter. The song was the B-side to Tex Ritter's, "I'm Wastin' My Tears on You". "There's a New Moon over My Shoulder" peaked at number two on the Folk Juke Box charts.

== Other versions ==
On March 23, 1944 Jimmie Davis recorded his version. Released in January 1945, it made it to number one for one week on the Folk Juke Box charts and spent a total of eighteen weeks on the chart. Other artists to cover the song include Bill Haley & His Comets, Jim Reeves and Wanda Jackson.

Preceded by "I'm Losing My Mind Over You" by Al Dexter and His Troopers	Most Played Juke Box Folk Records number one single by Jimmie Davis; March 17, 1945	Succeeded by "I'm Losing My Mind Over You" by Al Dexter and His Troopers
