= Freight Train Boogie =

Single by The Delmore Brothers
- Released: 1946
- Genre: Country
- Length: 2:44
- Label: King
- Songwriter(s): Scott, Nobar

"Freight Train Boogie" is a country music song written by Alton and Rabon Delmore under the pseudonyms, Jim Scott and Bob Nobar. The song was recorded by The Delmore Brothers in Cincinnati. It was released in 1946 on the King label (catalog no. 570-A). In December 1946, it reached No. 2 on the Billboard folk chart. It was also ranked as the No. 30 record on the Billboard 1946 year-end folk juke box chart. Often the recording is regarded as one of the first Rock and Roll recordings.

== See also ==
- Billboard Most-Played Folk Records of 1946
