= When You Leave, Don't Slam the Door =

1946 song by Joe Allison

Single by Tex Ritter
- B-side: "Have I Told You Lately That I Love You?"
- Released: September 2, 1946
- Recorded: July 31, 1946
- Genre: Country
- Length: 3:01
- Label: Capitol 296
- Songwriter(s): Joe Allison

"When You Leave, Don't Slam the Door" is a country music song written by Joe Allison, performed by Tex Ritter, and released on the Capitol label (catalog no. 296). In October 1946, it reached No. 3 on the Billboard folk chart. It was also ranked as the No. 23 record in Billboard's 1946 year-end folk juke box chart.

== See also ==
- Billboard Most-Played Folk Records of 1946
