= Filipino Baby =

Single by Bill Cox, Cliff Hobs
- Released: 1938
- Genre: Country
- Label: Vocalion
- Songwriter(s): Bill Cox, Clarke Van Ness

"Filipino Baby" is a country music song written by Bill Cox and Clarke Van Ness. First recorded in 1937, it was based on an earlier song from 1899. The song became a hit in 1946 for three different country artists: Cowboy Copas, T. Texas Tyler, and Ernest Tubb.

== Lyrics ==
The song tells of warships leaving Manila as sailors recall the islands where they spent happy hours "making love to every pretty girl they met." One bright-eyed sailor displays a photo of his Filipino maiden, described as "my treasure and my pet", who has pearly teeth, hair as black as jet, and lips as sweet as honey. The sailor returns from South Carolina to marry his Filipino baby.

While the song's original lyrics refer to a "colored sailor" and a "black-faced" Filipino girl, this element was modified in later versions. In Cowboy Copas' 1946 version, there is no indication that the sailor is colored, and the girl is described as his "dark-faced Filipino baby." In other versions, reference to the darkness of the girl's face is omitted.

== Origin ==
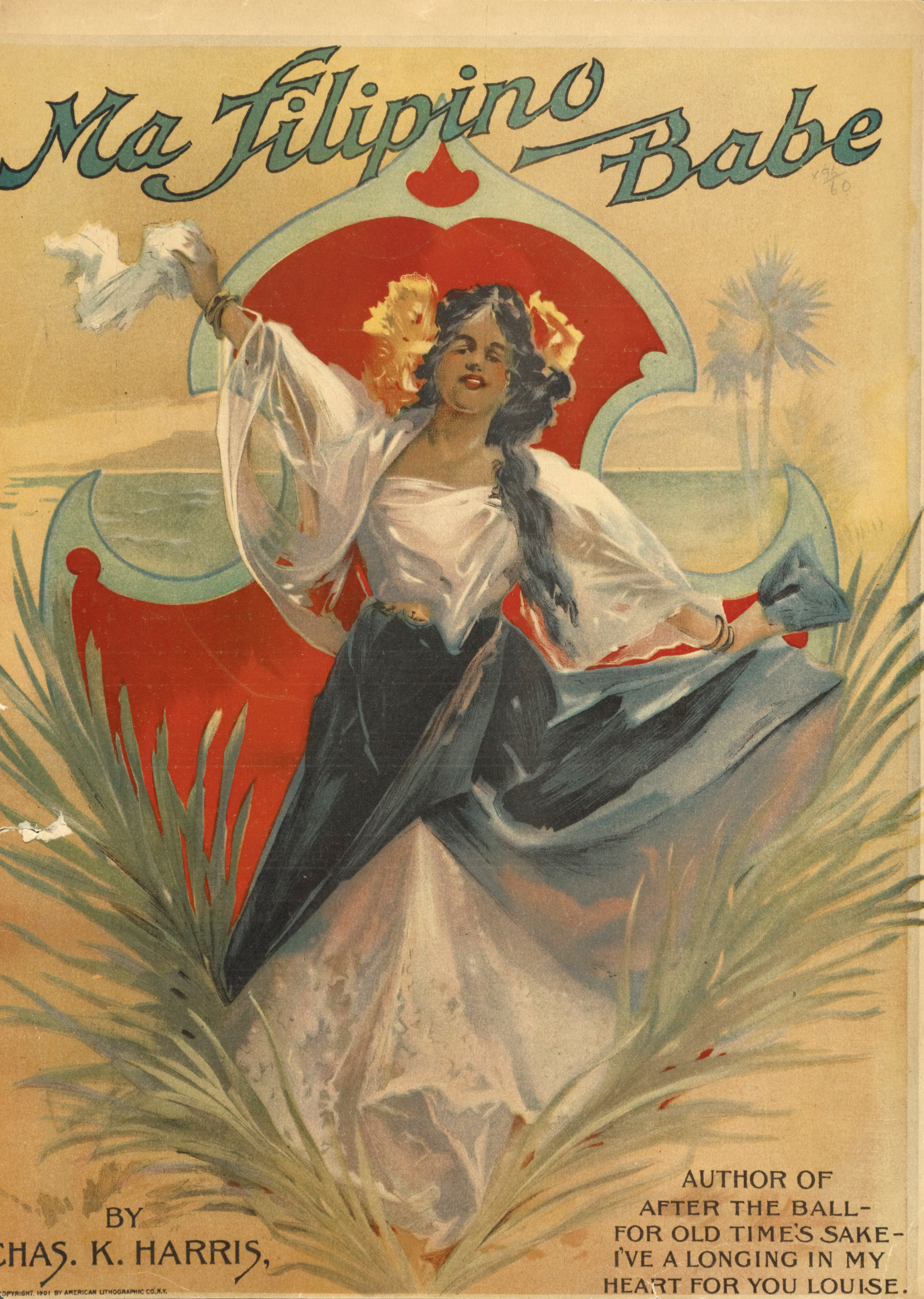
Sheet music for "Mah Filipino Baby"

Cox claimed he wrote the song about an uncle who married a Filipino woman during the Philippine–American War. However, the lyrics largely mirror an earlier song, "Ma Filipino Baby", copyrighted in 1899 by Charles K. Harris.

== Recording history ==
The song was first recorded in 1937 by Bill Cox and Cliff Hobbs and released on the Vocalion label in 1938.

The song became a hit in 1946 for three different country artists: Cowboy Copas, T. Texas Tyler, and Ernest Tubb. The Copas version was released on the King label and reached No. 4 on the country chart in August 1946. The Tyler version was released on the 4 Star label and reached No. 5 in August 1946. The Tubb version was released on the Decca label and reached No. 2 in November 1946 and ranked No. 17 on the year-end country charts.

The song was later covered by Hank Locklin on his 1958 album, Foreign Love. Locklin's release was a concept album containing 12 songs about foreign love affairs with other songs including "Fraulein", "Geisha Girl", and "Mexicali Rose".

Additional covers include versions by Charley Pride, Roy Acuff, Dave Dudley, Mitchell Torok, Bob Luman, Mac Wiseman and Pearl Harbour.

== Follow-up songs ==
The song's popularity also led to at least three follow-up songs. Tubb released "My Filipino Rose" in 1949. Copas released "New Filipino Baby" in 1961 on the Starday label.

In 1963, Robert E. Lee and His Travelers released "Son of the Filipino Baby" on the Sage & Sand label. It tells of the 17-year-old son of the original Filipino Baby who is then serving in the Navy. He is stationed in the Philippines, and he has met his own Filipino maiden.

== See also ==
- Billboard Most-Played Folk Records of 1946
