= Wave to Me, My Lady =

Single by Elton Britt
- Released: 1946
- Genre: Country
- Label: RCA Victor
- Songwriter(s): William Stein, Frank Loesser

"Wave to Me, My Lady" is a country music song written by William Stein and Frank Loesser, sung by Elton Britt, and released on the RCA Victor label (catalog no. 20–1789). In March 1946, it reached No. 3 on the Billboard folk chart. It was also ranked as the No. 22 record in Billboard's 1946 year-end folk juke box chart.

Gene Autry recorded a version that reached No. 4 on the Billboard folk chart one month after Britt's version. Autry's version ranked as the No. 23 record in the 1946 year-end folk chart.

The song was also covered by other artists, including Tex Ritter, Gene Autry, Jimmie Davis, and The Dinning Sisters.

== See also ==
- Billboard Most-Played Folk Records of 1946
