= That's How Much I Love You (Eddy Arnold song) =

Single by Eddy Arnold and his Tennessee Plowboys
- B-side: "Chained To A Memory"
- Published: October 25, 1946 by Wallace Fowler Publications
- Released: September 1946
- Recorded: March 20, 1946
- Genre: Country
- Length: 2:39
- Label: RCA Victor 20-1948
- Songwriters: Eddy Arnold; J. Graydon Hall; Wally Fowler

Eddy Arnold and his Tennessee Plowboys singles chronology
"Many Tears Ago" (1946)	"That's How Much I Love You" (1946)	"What Is Life Without Love" (1946)

"That's How Much I Love You" is a country music song written by Arnold, Fowler, and Hall, sung by Eddy Arnold, and released in 1946 on the RCA Victor label (catalog no. 20-1948-A). In October 1946, it reached No. 2 on the Billboard folk chart. It was also ranked as the No. 10 record on the Billboard 1946 year-end folk juke box chart.

The lyrics attempt to quantify the singer's love for his girl. If he had a nickel, he would spend it all on candy for her. If she was a kitten, he'd stroke her and listen to her purr. If she were a horsefly and he were a horse, he would let her bite him. And if she wanted to marry, he would find the parson and let him tie the knot. The song closes: "That's how much I love you."

== Cover versions ==
- Frank Sinatra covered "That's How Much I Love You" in 1947. His version reached #10 (U.S.).
- Bing Crosby also covered the song and his version reached No. 17 in 1947
- Pat Boone covered the song in 1958. His rendition peaked at #39 on the U.S. Billboard Hot 100.

== See also ==
- Billboard Most-Played Folk Records of 1946
