= Down at the Roadside Inn =

Single by Al Dexter
- Released: 1947
- Recorded: 1946
- Genre: Country
- Length: 2:36
- Label: Columbia
- Songwriters: Edith Bergdahl, Robert McGimsey

"Down at the Roadside Inn" is a song written by Al Dexter, recorded in June 1946 by Al Dexter & His Troopers, and released in 1947 on the Columbia label (catalog no. 37303). In May 1947, it peaked at No. 4 on the Billboard folk chart. It was also ranked as the No. 16 record on the Billboard 1947 year-end folk juke box chart.

The song's lyrics concern "that cute little girl with the little red curls down at the roadside inn" who drives the boys crazy when she dances and prances.

The song was covered by Leon McAuliffe.
