= Don't Telephone – Don't Telegraph (Tell a Woman) =

Single by Tex Williams and His Western Caravan
- B-side: "Blue as a Heart Ache"
- Released: 1947
- Genre: Western swing
- Label: Capitol
- Songwriter: Fred Rose

"Don't Telephone – Don't Telegraph (Tell a Woman)" is a song written by Fred Rose and popularized by Tex Williams and His Western Caravan. It was released on Capitol Records in 1947 with "Blue as a Heart Ache" as the "B" side. It peaked in February 1948 at No. 2 on the Billboard folk chart. It remained on the chart for a total of eleven weeks. The lyrics assert that the fastest way to spread the news is not by telephone or telegraph but rather to tell a woman, as she will tell the whole town.

The song was also covered in 1947 by Roy Hogsed & The Rainbow Riders and Johnny Tyler and Riders of the Rio Grande, and in 1948 by Homer and Jethro on the King Records label, record no. 695-A.

The song was included on multiple compilation albums, including "Cornier than Corn" (1963), "That's What I Like About the West" (2002), "I Got Texas in My Soul: A Centenary Tribute, His 20 Finest 1944-1954" (2017), "Hillbilly Musi: Talking on the Telephone Vol. 2" (2017), and "The Capitol Years 1946-51" (2019).
