= That's What I Like About the West =

Single by Tex Williams and His Western Caravan
- B-side: "Downtown Poker Club"
- Released: 1947
- Genre: Country, Western swing
- Length: 2:39
- Label: Capitol Americana
- Songwriters: Robert MacGimsey, Edith Bergdahl

"That's' What I Like About the West" is a Western swing and country song written by Robert MacGimsey and Edith Bergdahl and popularized in a record by Williams and His Western Caravan. It was released in August 1947 on Capitol Records with "Smoke! Smoke! Smoke! (That Cigarette)" as the "A" side. It was also issued as the "A" side on Capitol American with "Downtown Poker Club" as the "B" side. It peaked in October 1947 at No. 4 on the Billboard folk chart. It remained on the chart for a total of eight weeks. It also ranked No. 14 on Billboard Most-Played Folk Records of 1947. With the success of hit records "Smoke! Smoke! Smoke!", "That's' What I Like About the West", and "Never Trust a Woman", Williams and His Western Caravan placed eighth on the Billboard ranking of the top bands on the nation's juke boxes in 1947.

The song was included in multiple Tex Williams compilation albums, including "That's What I Like About the West" (2002), "I Got Texas in My Soul: A Centenary Tribute, His 20 Finest 1944-1954" (2017), and "The Capitol Years 1946-51" (2019).
