= I Wish I Had Never Met Sunshine =

Single by Gene Autry
- Released: 1946
- Genre: Country
- Label: Columbia
- Songwriter(s): Autry, Evans, Haldeman

"I Wish I Had Never Met Sunshine" is a country music song written by Gene Autry, Dale Evans, and Oakley Haldeman. It was sung by Gene Autry and released on the Columbia label (catalog no. 36970). In May 1946, it reached No. 3 on the Billboard folk chart. It was also ranked as the No. 13 record in Billboard's 1946 year-end folk juke box chart.

The song was later covered by other artists, including Johnny Cash and June Carter Cash (duet), Tex Ritter, Roy Rogers, and Wesley Tuttle.

== See also ==
- Billboard Most-Played Folk Records of 1946
