= Cincinnati Lou =

Song by Merle Travis
- Released: 1946
- Genre: Country
- Length: 2:36
- Label: Capitol
- Songwriter(s): Merle Travis, Shug Fisher

"Cincinnati Lou" is a country music song recorded by Merle Travis and released on the Capitol label. It was co-written by Travis and Shug Fisher.

The song was first recorded in 1945 by Tin Ear Tanner and His Back Room Boys, but it became a hit the following year when it was recorded by Travis. It reached No. 2 on the country chart in June 1946. In Billboard's year-end country and western chart, it ranked as the No. 8 song of 1946.

The song's lyrics describe a woman named "Cincinnati Lou" who can drink more beer than a two-ton truck can haul. The way she rolls her eyes makes the singer think of paradise, as in "a pair of dice". She put the "O" in Ohio and the "sin" in Cincinnati. She makes the rooster crow for days and made grandpa throw his cane away.

The song was later included on Travis' 1962 album, "Travis!". It was also included on Rhino's 1990 compilation, "The Best of Merle Travis", and on "The Definitive Collection" (2008).

It was also covered by Hank Thompson.

== See also ==
- Billboard Most-Played Folk Records of 1946
