= Rosalie Allen =

American musician, noted for yodeling

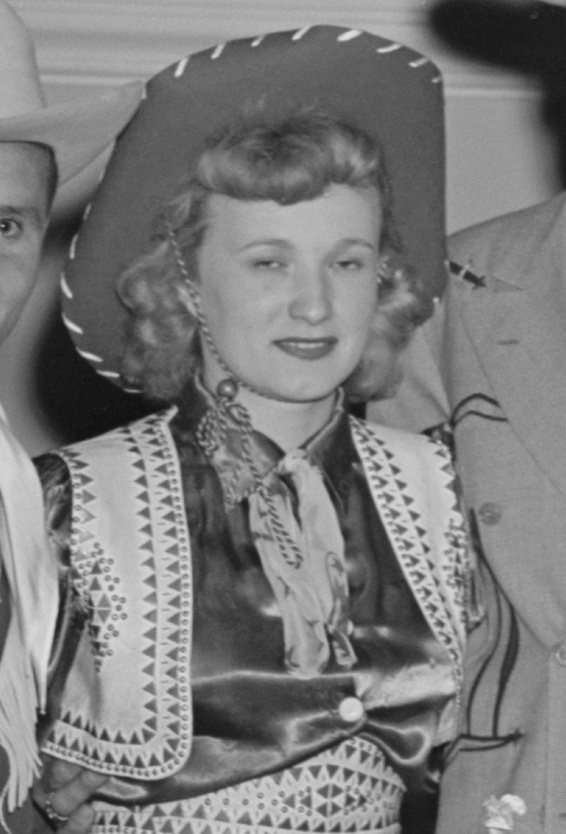
- Allen in 1947

Background information
- Born: Julie Marlene Bedra; June 27, 1924; Old Forge, Pennsylvania, U.S.
- Died: September 23, 2003 (aged 79) Van Nuys, California, U.S.
- Occupations: Singer; songwriter; musician; radio and television host; columnist

Rosalie Allen (born Julie Marlene Bedra; June 27, 1924 – September 23, 2003) was an American country singer, songwriter, guitarist, columnist and television and radio host who was noted for her yodeling. She was known as the Queen of Yodeling and was the first woman inducted into the Country Music DJ Hall of Fame.

== Early life ==
Rosalie Allen was born in Old Forge, Lackawanna County, Pennsylvania (some sources give her given birth name as Julia, or Juliana rather than Julie) Allen grew up the daughter of a Polish immigrant miner in a family of 12 children in Pennsylvania. During the Great Depression, at age nine, she worked as a dishwasher to help with the family's finances.

Inspired by the singing cowboys of the 1930s, Allen taught herself to sing and play her brother's guitar. In 1939, she earned the title "Queen of Yodeling" after winning a yodeling contest, and continued to use this moniker throughout her career. The contest's prize was to sing on WBRE in Wilkes-Barre, Pennsylvania, a performance which was her radio debut.

== Career ==
Following her first appearance on WBRE, Allen went to WORK in York, Pennsylvania, and was a vocalist on Shorty Fincher's radio show Prairie Pals.

In 1943, she moved to New York City and performed on Denver Darling's Swing Billies pseudo-western radio show.

In 1944, she became a regular on Zebe Carver's Hill Country Jamboree show, which led to an offer of her own show the same year. The half-hour program, Prairie Stars on WOV in New York, aired six nights a week and was so popular that Country Music magazine named her the most famous country music personality in Manhattan.

In the 1940s, she ran a country western record shop called Rosalie Allen's Hillbilly Music Center on West 54th Street in New York City, one of the first record stores in the United States to exclusively sell country music.

During the late 1940s and 1950s, she was a regular contributor to country music publications National Jamboree, Country Sound Roundup and Hoedown.

Her first hit came in 1946 with RCA Victor with a yodeling update of Patsy Montana's "I Want to Be a Cowboy's Sweetheart", followed by the successful release of "Guitar Polka".

From 1946 to 1951, Allen released singles with The Black River Riders on RCA Victor.

In 1949, she appeared in the New York City-based music program series Village Barn. From 1949 to 1953, she also hosted her own television show, the first country music show in New York City.

From 1949 to 1956, Allen performed nightly live shows at the Village Barn and hosted an Armed Forces Radio Network show. She stayed with the WOV show until 1956, when the rising popularity of rock music contributed to a downturn in popularity of country music.

Allen later paired up with yodeler Elton Britt; their first single, "Beyond the Sunset," hit number seven in 1950. They also recorded "The Yodel Blues" and "Quicksilver" and in 1958 released a joint album Elton Britt & Rosalie Allen.

She released a number of albums including Rodeo in 1959.

Her final album was The Queen Of The Yodelers, released in 1983.

== Personal life and death ==
Allen retired to Alabama to start a family in the 1950s. She gave birth to one daughter. In her later life, she suffered from diabetes and other ailments.

After a brief illness with congestive heart failure, Allen died on September 23, 2003, in Van Nuys, California.

== Legacy ==
In 1999, Allen's work in radio was recognized and she was the first woman inducted into the Country Music D J Hall of Fame.
