= I'm Losing My Mind Over You =

Single by Al Dexter and His Troopers
- B-side: "I'll Wait For You Dear"
- Published: April 6, 1942 copyrighted Albert Poindexter & James B. Paris, Troup, Texas
- Released: December 11, 1944
- Recorded: March 21, 1942
- Studio: CBS Columbia Square Studio, Hollywood, California
- Genre: Country (Hillbilly), honky-tonk
- Label: Okeh 6727
- Songwriter(s): Al Dexter, James B. Paris

Al Dexter and His Troopers singles chronology
"So Long Pal / Too Late to Worry, Too Blue to Cry" (1944)	"I'm Losing My Mind Over You" (1944)	"Triffin' Gal / I'm Lost Without You" (1945)

"I'm Losing My Mind Over You" is a 1945 song by Al Dexter and His Troopers. The song was Al Dexter's fifth release as well as his fifth number one on the Folk/Juke Box charts. The B-side of the song, entitled, "I'll Wait For You Dear" peaked at number two on the same chart.
