= Never Trust a Woman (song) =

Single by Tex Williams and His Western Caravan
- B-side: "What It Means To Be Blue"
- Released: 1947
- Genre: Western swing
- Label: Capitol
- Songwriters: Tex Williams, Smokey Rogers

"Never Trust a Woman" is a song written by Tex Williams and Smokey Rogers and popularized in a 1947 record by Williams and His Western Caravan. It was released on Capitol Records with "What It Means To Be Blue" as the "B" side. It peaked in December 1947 at No. 2 on the Billboard most played juke box folk records chart. It remained on the chart for a total of fifteen weeks. With the success of hit records "Smoke! Smoke! Smoke! (That Cigarette)", "Never Trust a Woman", and "That's' What I Like About the West", Williams and His Western Caravan ranked eighth on the Billboard ranking of the top bands on the nation's juke boxes in 1947.

Two other artists also had hits with the song on the Billboard folk juke box chart. A version by Red Foley and The Cumberland Valley Boys reached No. 2 on the folk chart in November 1947, lingered on the chart for 13 weeks, and tied for sixteenth place on the Billboard Most-Played Folk Records of 1947. A third version by Tiny Hill and His Cactus Cutups peaked at No. 5 on the folk chart in January 1948. The three version captured three of the top five spots on the folk juke box chart on January 10, 1948.

The song was included in multiple Tex Williams compilation albums, including "That's What I Like About the West" (2002), "I Got Texas in My Soul: A Centenary Tribute, His 20 Finest 1944-1954" (2017), and "The Capitol Years 1946-51" (2019).
