= Silver Spurs (On the Golden Stairs) =

Single by Gene Autry
- Released: 1946
- Genre: Country
- Label: Columbia
- Songwriter(s): Cindy Walker, Gene Autry

"Silver Spurs (On the Golden Stairs)" is a country music song written by Cindy Walker and Gene Autry, sung by Autry, and released in 1946 on the Columbia label (catalog no. 36904). In February 1946, it reached No. 4 on the Billboard most-played folk chart. It was also ranked as the No. 27 record on the Billboard 1946 year-end folk record sellers chart.

== See also ==
- Billboard Most-Played Folk Records of 1946
