= Bill Cox (folk musician) =

American folk singer

- Also known as: Luke Baldwin; Dixie Songbird; Clyde Ashley
- Born: William Jennings Cox; August 4, 1897; Eagle, West Virginia, U.S.
- Died: December 10, 1968 (aged 71)
- Genres: Country, folk
- Occupations: Singer-songwriter, musician
- Instruments: Vocals, guitar, harmonica
- Years active: 1927–1940
- Formerly of: Cliff Hobbs

William Jennings Cox (August 4, 1897 – December 10, 1968) was an American folk singer known as the "Dixie Songbird", active from 1927 to 1940.

Born in Eagle, West Virginia, the son of a railroad worker, he began playing guitar and singing at parties around Charleston, West Virginia in the 1920s. From 1928, he had his own radio program on station WOBU, and won a recording contract with Gennett Records. He recorded over 40 songs between 1929 and 1931, including many cover versions of Jimmie Rodgers' songs, which the station played whenever Cox was unavailable.

He moved to the American Record Corporation in 1933, under producer Art Satherley, and often recorded duets with the much younger singer Cliff Hobbs (1916 – 1961). They recorded some 60 songs together during the 1930s, including "Filipino Baby" and "Sparkling Brown Eyes".

After retiring in 1940, Cox ended up falling on hard times. He was rediscovered in 1966 living in poverty in a converted chicken coop, but died before he was able to make further public appearances.
