= Too Late to Worry, Too Blue to Cry (song) =

Single by Al Dexter and His Troopers
- B-side: "So Long Pal"
- Published: February 16, 1942 copyrighted Albert Poindexter, Troup, Texas
- Released: February 6, 1944
- Recorded: March 18, 1942
- Studio: CBS Columbia Square Studio, Hollywood, California
- Genre: Country (Hillbilly)
- Label: Okeh 6718
- Songwriter: Al Dexter

Al Dexter and His Troopers singles chronology
"Pistol Packin' Mama / Rosalita" (1943)	"Too Late to Worry, Too Blue to Cry" (1944)	"I'm Losing My Mind Over You" (1945)

"Too Late to Worry, Too Blue to Cry" is a 1942 song by Al Dexter. It was recorded on March 18, 1942 at the CBS Studio at Radio Station KNX, Sunset Blvd., Hollywood, California with session musicians Frank Marvin, Johnny Bond and Dick Reinhart.

== Released and ranking ==
It was released on Okeh records #6718 on February 6, 1944, paired with "So Long Pal". It went to number one on the Folk Juke Box charts for two weeks and stayed on the charts for a total of thirty weeks.

== Cover versions ==
- A cover by Glen Campbell reached No. 76 on the US pop chart in 1962 and was the title song of a Campbell album in 1963.
- Esther Phillips reached No. 121 on the Billboard Hot 100 and No. 35 on the Billboard Hot Rhythm & Blues Singles chart in early 1969.
- A cover by Ronnie Milsap peaked at number six on the Billboard Hot Country Singles chart in 1975. His version was also a minor pop hit, reaching #101 Billboard and #87 Cash Box.
