= Rosalita (Al Dexter song) =

1943 single by Al Dexter and His Troopers

Single by Al Dexter and His Troopers
- B-side: "Pistol Packin' Mama"
- Published: February 4, 1942 Peer International Corporation
- Released: March 1943
- Recorded: March 18, 1942
- Studio: CBS Columbia Square Studio, Los Angeles
- Genre: Country (Hillbilly), honky-tonk
- Length: 2:51
- Label: Okeh 6708
- Songwriter: Al Dexter

Al Dexter and His Troopers singles chronology
"Honky Tonk Chinese Dime" (1942)	"Rosalita" (1943)	"So Long Pal / Too Late to Worry, Too Blue to Cry" (1944)

"Rosalita" is a 1942 song performed by Al Dexter and His Troopers. It was recorded on March 18, 1942 at the CBS Studio at Radio Station KNX, Sunset Blvd., Hollywood, California with session musicians Frank Marvin, Johnny Bond and Dick Reinhart. It was released on Okeh Records #6708 in March 1943, paired with "Pistol Packin' Mama". After the "Most Played Jukebox Folk Records" chart was established on January 8, 1944, it remained for six months, peaking at #1 on March 11, 1944.
