= I'm Wastin' My Tears on You =

1944 song by Frank Harford and Tex Ritter

Single by Tex Ritter and His Texans
- Language: English
- B-side: "There's a New Moon Over My Shoulder"
- Released: October 1944
- Recorded: November 23, 1943
- Genre: Country
- Length: 2:49
- Label: Capitol 174
- Songwriter(s): Frank Harford, Tex Ritter

Tex Ritter and His Texans singles chronology
"Have I Stayed Away Too Long" (1944)	"I'm Wastin' My Tears on You" (1944)	"Jealous Heart" (1944)

"I'm Wastin' My Tears on You" is a song written by Frank Harford, and recorded in 1944 by Tex Ritter. The song was the first of three number ones on the Juke Box Folk records chart. "I"m Wastin' My Tears on You" stayed at number one for six weeks with a total of twenty weeks on the chart. The B-side of the song, entitled "There's a New Moon Over My Shoulder", peaked at number two on the same chart.
