= They Took the Stars Out of Heaven =

Single by Floyd Tillman
- B-side: "Why Do You Treat me This Way"
- Released: 1943
- Genre: Country
- Label: Decca
- Songwriter: Floyd Tillman

"They Took the Stars Out of Heaven" is a country music song that was written and performed by Floyd Tillman. It was released in 1943 on the Decca label (catalog no. 6090A) with "Why Do You Treat me This Way" as the "B" side. It rose to No. 1 on the Billboard juke box folk music chart in March 1944 and remained on the chart for 13 weeks. It was Tillman's first hit record and the biggest of his career. The lyrics tell of losing one's sweetheart.

They took the stars out of heaven
The day they took her from me.

The song was later covered by multiple artists, including Elton Britt, Ray Pennington, and Retta & The Smart Fellas. Tillman's version also appeared in multiple compilation albums including "Floyd Tillman's Greatest" (1958), "Country Music Hall of Fame" (1991), "The Influence" (2004), and "Columbia & RCA Sessions (1946-1957)" (2018).
