= So Round, So Firm, So Fully Packed =

1946 song by Merle Travis, Eddie Kirk and Cliffie Stone

Single by Merle Travis
- B-side: "Sweet Temptation"
- Published: January 8, 1947 by American Music, Inc., Hollywood
- Released: January 1947
- Recorded: October 19, 1946
- Studio: Radio Recorders, Los Angeles
- Genre: Hillbilly
- Length: 2:59
- Label: Capitol 349
- Songwriters: Merle Travis, Cliffie Stone, Eddie Kirk
- Producer: Lee Gillette

Merle Travis singles chronology
| "Divorce Me C.O.D." (1946) | "So Round, So Firm, So Fully Packed" (1947) | "Steel Guitar Rag" (1947) |

"So Round, So Firm, So Fully Packed" is a 1947 song by Merle Travis, written by Travis, Eddie Kirk, and Cliffie Stone.

== Lyrics ==
The song's lyrics describes a woman's attributes using several advertising slogans of the day:

- The lyrics refer to the woman as "so round, so firm, so fully packed, that's my gal," borrowing from the Lucky Strike slogan "So round, so firm, so fully packed, so free and easy on the draw."
- The lyrics continue, "You can bet your boots I'd walk a mile," referencing the slogan for Camel cigarettes.
- The lyrics assert that, "If you don't think she's a lot of fun, just aske the man who owns one," incorporating the slogan from Packard automobiles ("Just ask the man who owns one."
- Finally, the lyric continue, "She's got the pause that's so refreshing", incorporating the Coca-Cola slogan "The pause that refreshes".

== Chart performance ==
The song was Travis' second number one on the Folk Juke Box charts, where it stayed at number one for 14 weeks and a total of 21 weeks on the chart.

== Cover versions ==
- In 1947 it was also a No. 3 hit for Johnny Bond, and a No. 5 hit for Ernest Tubb.
- Eddy Arnold covered the song on his 1954 album Eddy Arnold: An American Institution and his 1956 album A Dozen Hits.
- Ricky Skaggs covered the song on his 1981 album Waitin' for the Sun to Shine.

| Preceded by "Rainbow at Midnight" by Ernest Tubb | Most Played Juke Box Folk Records number one single by Merle Travis; February 8, 1947 | Succeeded by "New Jolie Blonde (New Pretty Blonde)" by Red Foley |
