= Pistol Packin' Mama =

1942 song by Al Dexter

Single by Al Dexter and His Troopers
- B-side: "Rosalita"
- Published: June 8, 1943 Edwin H. Morris & Co., Inc.
- Released: March 1943
- Recorded: March 20, 1942
- Studio: CBS Columbia Square Studio, Los Angeles
- Genre: Country, honky-tonk
- Length: 2:47
- Label: Okeh 6708
- Songwriter: Al Dexter

Al Dexter and His Troopers singles chronology
"Honky Tonk Chinese Dime" (1942)	"Pistol Packin' Mama" (1943)	"So Long Pal / Too Late to Worry, Too Blue to Cry" (1944)

"Pistol Packin' Mama"

Single by Bing Crosby and the Andrews Sisters
- B-side: Vict'ry Polka
- Released: October 21, 1943
- Recorded: September 27, 1943
- Genre: Country, pop
- Length: 3:01
- Label: Decca 23277
- Songwriter: Al Dexter

Bing Crosby and the Andrews Sisters singles chronology
"Yodelin' Jive / Ciribiribin (They're So in Love)" (1939)	"Pistol Packin' Mama" (1943)	"Jingle Bells / Santa Claus is Comin' to Town" (1943)

Pistol Packin' Mama by Al Dexter & His Troopers

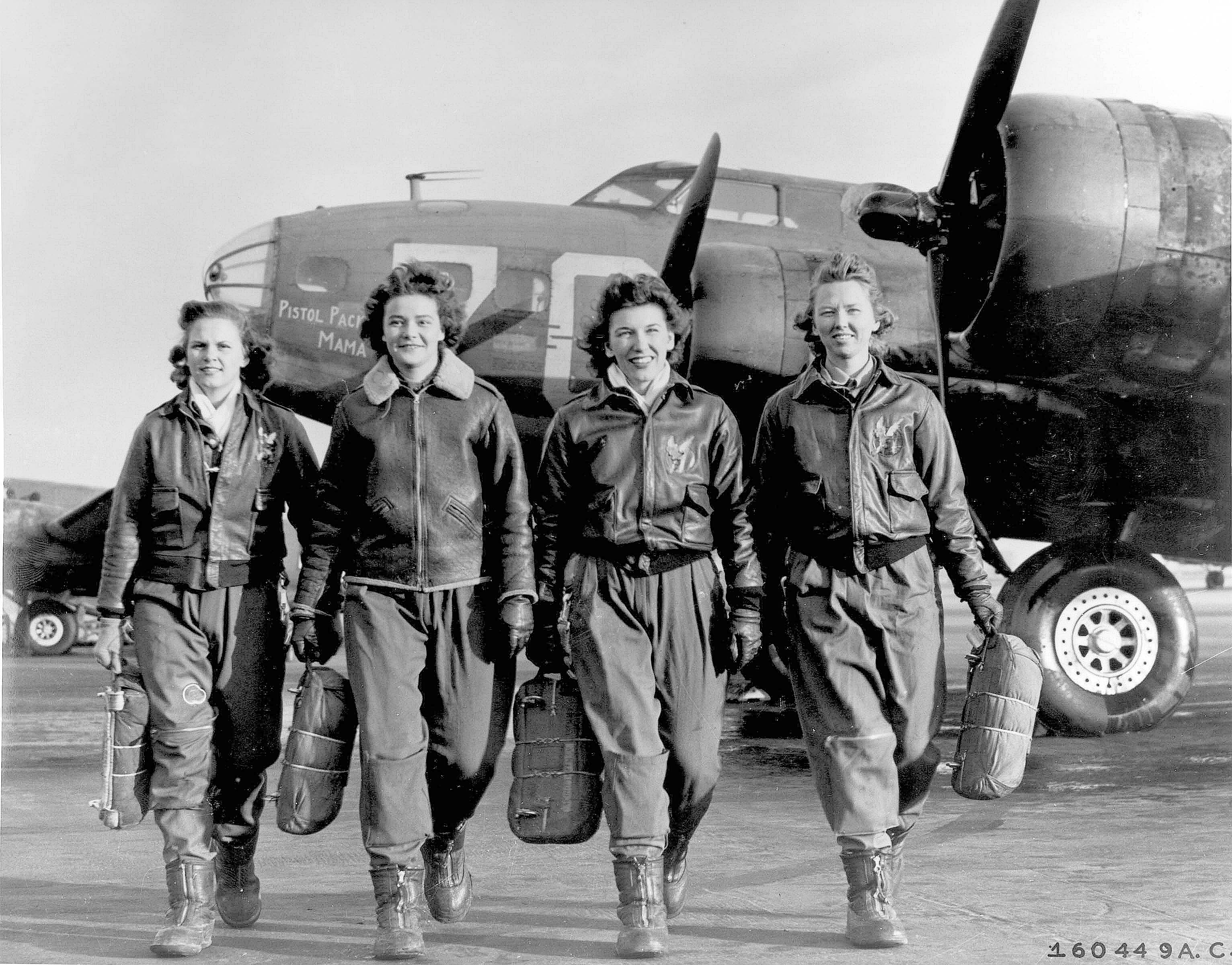
Women Airforce Service Pilots named in 1944 their B-17 Flying Fortress, "Pistol Packin' Mama"

"Pistol Packin' Mama" is a song written and recorded by Al Dexter on March 20, 1942 in Los Angeles, California on March 20, 1942. It was used in the 1943 eponymous film, starring Ruth Terry and Robert Livingston. It featured top session musicians Dick Roberts, Johnny Bond and Dick Reinhart, who all normally worked for Gene Autry.

1943 was dominated by a musicians' strike, which since August 1942 had prevented the recording of commercial music by the record companies. As the strike dragged on, the labels began releasing material from their artists' back catalogues, until by mid-1943, that ran out too. Okeh Records released Al Dexter's "Pistol Packin' Mama", backed with "Rosalita", in March. It sold quickly, helped by reports in Billboard magazine and great popularity in jukeboxes, which had run out of fresh material to play. Although Billboard did not publish its first Folk-Hillbilly chart until January 8, 1944, "Pistol Packin' Mama" became the first "Hillbilly" record to reach no. 1 on the National Best Selling Retail Records chart, on October 30, 1943, and spent sixteen weeks in the top 10, on its way to selling 3 million copies. It entered the Jukebox chart on July 31, 1943, where it stayed for 28 weeks (the last 14 shared with the Bing Crosby version). In Billboard's 1943 Yearbook, released in September, Dexter's "Pistol Packin' Mama" was the only hillbilly record to join Glenn Miller and Tommy Dorsey in the best-selling record list.

Crosby, always a major fan of "hillbilly" music, was finally able to record a cover version with the Andrews Sisters on September 27, when his label, Decca, became the first to settle with the union. The single, released on October 21, followed Dexter's to the top, revitalizing popularity and sales into 1944. When the first Billboard "Most Played Jukebox Folk Records" chart was published, both "Pistol Packin' Mama" versions tied for Number 1, and remained tied for seven straight weeks.

The NBC radio network banned Crosby's version because of the line "drinking beer in a cabaret." The lyrics had to be changed to "singing songs in a cabaret" before it could air.

== Chart performance ==
=== Al Dexter and His Troopers ===
Charts (1943–44)	Rank
US Billboard National Best Selling Retail Records	1
"The Billboard American Folk Records" column	1
US Billboard Harlem Hit Parade	5
US Billboard National Best Selling Retail Records Year-End	9
"The Billboard American Folk Records" Year-End	1
US Billboard R&B Records Year-End	39

=== Bing Crosby & Andrews Sisters ===
Charts (1943–44)	Rank
US Billboard National Best Selling Retail Records	2
"The Billboard American Folk Records" column	1
US Billboard Harlem Hit Parade	3
US Billboard National Best Selling Retail Records Year-End	22
"The Billboard American Folk Records" Year-End	2
US Billboard R&B Records Year-End	29

== Other recordings ==
- According to the database of secondhandsongs.com, "Pistol Packin' Mama" has been recorded by 46 different artists as of July 2021.
- The Pied Pipers featuring Jo Stafford with Paul Weston and his orchestra on Capitol Records 140, recorded on September 27, 1943.
- Louis Jordan performed a "hillbilly rendition" of the song, which drew laughs, during a November 1943 appearance in a show at the Orpheum Theater in Los Angeles.
- Gene Vincent's 1960 version reached No. 15 in the UK charts and featured Georgie Fame on piano.
- Peppi Borza performed a cover in 1964 whilst performing in the group Peppi and the New York Twisters.
- The Flamin' Groovies recorded a version of the song on their 1969 debut album Supersnazz.
- Stompin' Tom Connors recorded a version as the title track for his 1971 album.
- Singer/songwriter Hoyt Axton recorded a country version of the song as the title track to his 1982 album.
- Québécois singer Oscar Morin recorded a French chanson "Dans le bon vieux temps" using the same tune in the 1950s.

== Other uses ==
- The Irving Berlin song "You Can't Get a Man with a Gun", from the musical Annie Get Your Gun, contains the lyric: "A man's love is mighty, he'll even buy a nightie, for a gal who he thinks is fun. But they don't buy pajamas for pistol packin' mamas."
- The chorus of the song was used for the 1970s UK television advertising campaign for Rowntree's Fruit Pastilles, with the punning tag line "Pastille Pickin' Mama, pass those pastilles round."
- It is also continually referenced in Spike Milligan's Goodbye Soldier (1986), which is part of his memoirs of World War II and just after it. In it he states that as Mussolini did not like jazz, after he was defeated the Italians were getting into jazz, and as this song was popular at the time, this was one of the songs Milligan and his group was often asked to sing. He also states that this is one of the main songs sung by Italian jazz bands (in fact he states that some bands only ever sang this song).
