= So Long Pal =

Single by Al Dexter and His Troopers
- B-side: "Too Late to Worry, Too Blue to Cry"
- Published: April 3, 1942 copyrighted Albert Poindexter, Troup, Texas
- Released: February 6, 1944
- Recorded: March 18, 1942
- Studio: CBS Columbia Square Studio, Hollywood, California
- Genre: Country (Hillbilly)
- Label: Okeh 6718
- Songwriter(s): Al Dexter

Al Dexter and His Troopers singles chronology
"Pistol Packin' Mama / Rosalita" (1943)	"So Long Pal" (1944)	"I'm Losing My Mind Over You" (1945)

"So Long Pal" is a 1944 song by Al Dexter and His Troopers. The song was the follow-up to Al Dexter's two-sided hit, "Pistol Packin' Mama"/"Rosalita". It was recorded on March 18, 1942, along with "Rosalita" and the b-side "Too Late to Worry, Too Blue to Cry". "So Long Pal" stayed at the number one position on the Folk Juke Box chart for thirteen weeks in 1944. The B-side would also hit number one on the same chart.
