= Divorce Me C.O.D. =

1946 song by Merle Travis and Cliffie Stone

Single by Merle Travis
- B-side: "Missouri"
- Published: August 26, 1946 by American Music, Inc., Hollywood
- Released: September 1946
- Recorded: July 9, 1946
- Studio: Radio Recorders, Los Angeles
- Genre: Hillbilly
- Length: 2:59
- Label: Capitol 290
- Songwriters: Merle Travis, Cliffie Stone
- Producer: Lee Gillette

Merle Travis singles chronology
"No Vacancy" (1946)	"Divorce Me C.O.D." (1946)	"So Round, So Firm, So Fully Packed" (1947)

"Divorce Me C.O.D." is a 1946 honky-tonk song recorded by Merle Travis. One of many songs co-written by Travis and Cliffie Stone, it was Travis' first release to make it to number one on the Folk Juke Box charts where it stayed for fourteen weeks and a total of twenty-three weeks on the chart. The B-side of "Divorce Me C.O.D.," a song entitled "Missouri," peaked at number five on the same chart.

== Cover versions ==
- Later in 1946, The King Sisters made the top ten on the Juke Box Folk chart with their version of the song.
- In 1947, Johnny Bond, also made the top ten on the Juke Box Folk chart with his version of the song.

Preceded by "Wine Women and Song" by Al Dexter	Most Played Juke Box Folk Records number one single by Merle Travis; October 12, 1946	Succeeded by "Rainbow at Midnight" by Ernest Tubb
