= It's a Sin (Eddy Arnold song) =

1947 song by Zeb Turner and Fred Rose

"It's A Sin"

Single by Eddy Arnold and his Tennessee Plowboys
- B-side: "I Couldn't Believe It Was True"
- Published: May 11, 1947 by Millene Music, Nashvillle
- Released: April 12, 1947
- Recorded: September 24, 1946
- Studio: RCA Victor 24th Street, New York City
- Genre: Country
- Length: 2:33
- Label: RCA Victor 20-2241
- Songwriter(s): Fred Rose, Zeb Turner

Eddy Arnold and his Tennessee Plowboys singles chronology
"What Is Life Without Love" (1946)	"It's A Sin" (1947)	"I'll Hold You in My Heart (Till I Can Hold You in My Arms)" (1947)

"It's a Sin" is a country song written by country guitarist Zeb Turner and music publisher Fred Rose. The 1947 version by Eddy Arnold was his second number one on the Country & Western charts, spending five weeks at number one and a total of thirty-eight weeks on the chart. The B-side of "It's a Sin", a song entitled, "I Couldn't Believe it Was True" would peak at number four on the same chart.

A cover by Marty Robbins peaked at number five on the Billboard Hot Country Singles chart in 1969.

It has also been recorded by Bill Haley & His Comets (1957), Elvis Presley (1961), Don Gibson (1962), George Jones (1965), Dottie West (1969), Del Wood (1980), and Willie Nelson (1995).
