= What Is Life Without Love =

Single by Eddy Arnold and his Tennessee Plowboys
- B-side: "Be Sure There's No Mistake"
- Published: July 22, 1946 by Adams, Vee & Abbott, Inc., Chicago
- Released: December 10, 1946
- Recorded: March 20, 1946
- Studio: RCA Victor Studio, 30 S. Michigan Ave., Chicago, IL
- Genre: Country
- Length: 2:39
- Label: RCA Victor 20-2058
- Songwriter(s): Eddy Arnold; Vernice McAlpin; Owen Bradley

Eddy Arnold and his Tennessee Plowboys singles chronology
"That's How Much I Love You" (1946)	"What Is Life Without Love" (1946)	"It's A Sin" (1947)

"What Is Life Without Love" is a 1947 song by Eddy Arnold. The song was Arnold's first number one on the country chart in the US, spending one week at the top and a total of twenty-two weeks on the chart.
