= Sugar Moon (Bob Wills song) =

Single by Bob Wills and His Texas Playboys
- Recorded: 1947
- Genre: Western swing
- Label: Columbia
- Songwriter(s): Bob Wills, Cindy Walker

"Sugar Moon" is a Western swing love song written by Bob Wills and Cindy Walker.

The song was first recorded by Bob Wills and The Texas Playboys in 1947 (Columbia 37313), where it reached number one, staying on the charts six weeks.

== Lyrics ==
The title comes from a refrain in the chorus:

When it's sugarcane time,
Long around about June,
I'll be walkin' with sugar
'Neath that old sugar moon.

== Cover versions ==
It has been covered by other artists including:

- k.d. lang covered it on her Shadowland album (1988)
- Asleep at the Wheel
- Willie Nelson
- Joe Dinkins
