= New Jolie Blonde (New Pretty Blonde) =

1947 song by Red Foley

"New Jolie Blonde (New Pretty Blonde)" is a 1947 song by Red Foley. The song was Foley's third number one on the Folk Juke Box chart, spending two weeks at number one and a total of sixteen weeks on the chart.

The song is an old Cajun waltz, dating back at least to the 1920s. The first known recording on April 18, 1929, in Atlanta, Georgia, the Breaux Brothers recorded "Ma Blonde Est Partie". The Hackberry Ramblers' 1935 "Jolie Blonde" was a regional hit and helped introduce the song to audiences outside Cajun country. Cajun fiddler Harry Choates rearranged the song as "New Jolie Blonde", had a top ten hit with it in 1946, and then sold the rights to Moon Mullican, who had a #2 country hit with the song ("New Pretty Blonde (Jole Blon) in 1947. Roy Acuff had a #4 hit with another version, "Jole Blon". Billboard listed all three versions among the top 20 country/western songs of 1947 by sales.
