= Tex Williams =

American singer-songwriter (1917–1985)

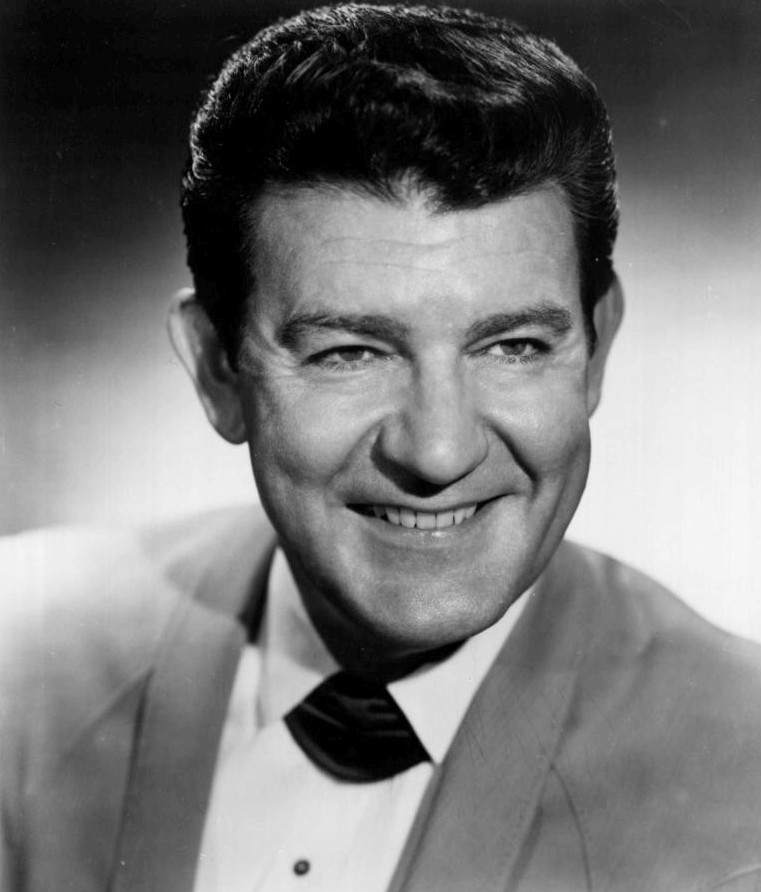
- Williams in 1967

Background information
- Born: Sollie Paul Williams; August 23, 1917
- Origin: Ramsey, Illinois, United States
- Died: October 11, 1985 (aged 68) Newhall, California, United States
- Genres: Western swing; country
- Occupation: Singer-songwriter
- Instruments: vocals, guitar, Harmonica
- Years active: 1946–1978

Sollie Paul "Tex" Williams (August 23, 1917 – October 11, 1985) was an American Western swing singer and musician. He is best known for his talking blues style; his biggest hit was the novelty song, "Smoke! Smoke! Smoke! (That Cigarette)", which held the number-one position on the Hot Country Songs chart for 16 weeks in 1947. "Smoke" was the number-five song on Billboard's Top 100 list for 1947, and was number one on the country chart that year.

== Early years ==
Williams was born as "Sollis Williams" in 1917, in Ramsey, Illinois. He was the youngest of 11 children; his father "Bud" Williams was a fiddler who operated a sawmill and blacksmith shop in Ramsey. He learned folk and traditional music from his father and older brother. He began performing on a local radio station at age 13 and moved to Decatur, Illinois, where he performed on radio station WJBL (later known as WSOY).

Williams moved to Texas in 1938. He settled in Denison, Texas, and adopted the nickname "Tex". He played guitar, banjo and harmonica. He played with several bands, including Peggy West and her Rocky Mountaineers, Cliff Goddard and His Reno Racketeers, and Walt Schrum's Colorado Hillbillies.

== Spade Cooley band ==
Williams moved to Los Angeles in 1942. He eventually became a vocalist for Western swing band leader Spade Cooley. Williams moved to the San Fernando Valley in Southern California where Cooley's band was based. Williams was the featured singer on the song "Shame on You" which was released in January 1945, became a No. 1 hit, and spent 31 weeks on the charts.

== Peak years (1945-1948) ==
In 1946, Capitol Records offered Williams a contract as a solo artist. After learning of Williams' plans, Cooley fired him in June 1946. Several of Cooley's musicians left with Williams and became part of Williams' band, the Western Caravan.

Williams and his band originally recorded polkas for Capitol Records. They had their first hit record with "The California Polka" which reached No. 4 on the Billboard folk chart. Williams' other polka releases included "Banjo Polka", "Roundup Polka", "Big Bass Polka", "Cowboy Polka", "Happy Birthday Polka", "Big Hat Polka", and "Johnstown Polka".

In July 1947, Williams and his band released the novelty song "Smoke! Smoke! Smoke! (That Cigarette)" written by Williams and Merle Travis. "Smoke! Smoke! Smoke!" became one of the biggest country hits of all time, reaching No. 1 on the pop chart and spending 16 weeks at No. 1 on the folk chart.

Williams followed up with two additional hits in 1947 ("That's What I Like About the West" and "Never Trust a Woman"), and Williams' band placed eighth on the Billboard ranking of the top bands on the nation's juke boxes in 1947.

Williams' success continued in 1948 with six Top 10 hits on the folk/country chart, including "Don't Telephone – Don't Telegraph (Tell a Woman)", "Suspicion", "Banjo Polka", and "Life Gits Tee-Jus, Don't It?"

Williams also appeared in approximately 25 short movies, including Tex Williams & Orchestra in Western Whoopee (1948), Cheyenne Cowboy (1949), Coyote Canyon (1949), and The Pecos Pistol (1949).

== Later years ==
Williams' success slowed after 1948; he did not have another Top 10 song, but reached the Top 20 with "(There's a) Bluebird On Your Windowsill" (1949) and "Bottom of a Mountain" (1966). He continued releasing new music into the 1970s and had his final chart success in 1971 with "The Night Miss Nancy Ann's Hotel for Single Girls Burned Down".

Williams also hosted the "Tex Williams Show", a live remote television show broadcast on local television from 1952 to 1957 from the Riverside Rancho in Los Angeles (3213 Riverside Drive).

Williams lived in Newhall, Santa Clarita, California, for the last 27 years of his life. He operated Tex Williams Village, a nightclub at 23737 Newhall Ave in Santa Clarita. The building still stands, as of 2025. His nightclub opened in 1959, featured a large ballroom, a smaller "rumpus room", two bars, square dancing, and live music by Williams and other artists.

Williams died in 1985 at age 68 at the Newhall Community Hospital. Having gained fame for his song about the addictive power of cigarettes, Williams smoked two packs a day; his cancer began in his bladder and spread to his liver, and he ultimately died from kidney failure.

== Discography ==
=== Albums ===
Williams collection album cover

Year	Album	US Country	Label
1955	Country and Western Dance-O-Rama No. 5		Decca
1960	Smoke! Smoke! Smoke!		Capitol
1962	Country Music Time		Decca
1963	Voice of Authority		Imperial
1963	Tex Williams in Las Vegas		Liberty
1966	Two Sides of Tex Williams	26	Boone
1971	A Man Called Tex	38	Monument
1974	Those Lazy, Hazy Days		Granite
1977	The Legendary Tex Williams: Then... Now		Corral
1996	Vintage Collections: Tex Williams & His Western Caravan		Capitol

=== Singles ===
Year	Single	Chart Positions		Album
Year	Single	US Country	US	Album
1946	"The California Polka"	4		singles only
1947	"Smoke! Smoke! Smoke! (That Cigarette)"	1	1	singles only
1947	"That's What I Like About the West"	4		singles only
1947	"Never Trust a Woman"	8		singles only
1948	"Don't Telephone – Don't Telegraph (Tell a Woman)"	2		singles only
1948	"Suspicion"	4		singles only
1948	"Banjo Polka"	5		singles only
1948	"Who? Me?"	6		singles only
1948	"Foolish Tears"	15		singles only
1948	"Talking Boogie"	6		singles only
1948	"Just a Pair of Blue Eyes"	13		singles only
1948	"Life Gits Tee-Jus, Don't It?"	5	27	singles only
1949	"(There's a) Bluebird On Your Windowsill"	11		singles only
1965	"Too Many Tigers"	26		Two Sides of Tex Williams
1965	"Big Tennessee"	30		Two Sides of Tex Williams
1966	"Bottom of a Mountain"	18		Two Sides of Tex Williams
1966	"First Step Down"			singles only
1966	"Another Day, Another Dollar in the Hole"	44		singles only
1967	"Crazy Life"			singles only
1967	"Black Jack County"	57		singles only
1967	"She's Somebody Else's Heartache Now"			singles only
1968	"Smoke, Smoke, Smoke – '68"	32		singles only
1968	"Here's to You and Me"	45		singles only
1968	"Tail's Been Waggin' the Dog"			singles only
1970	"Big Oscar"			A Man Called Tex
1970	"It Ain't No Big Thing"	50		A Man Called Tex
1971	"The Night Miss Nancy Ann's Hotel for Single Girls Burned Down"^{A}	29		A Man Called Tex
1972	"Everywhere I Go (He's Already Been There)"	67		A Man Called Tex
1972	"Glamour of the Night Life (Is Calling Me Again)"			singles only
1972	"Tennessee Travelin'"			singles only
1972	"Cynthia Ann"			singles only
1974	"Is This All You Hear (When a Heart Breaks)"			Those Lazy, Hazy Days
1974	"Those Lazy, Hazy, Crazy Days of Summer"	70		Those Lazy, Hazy Days
1974	"Bum Bum Bum"			Those Lazy, Hazy Days
1978	"Make It Pretty for Me Baby"			single only

- "The Night Miss Nancy Ann's Hotel for Single Girls Burned Down" peaked at No. 27 on the RPM Country Tracks chart in Canada.
