= Elton Britt =

American singer-songwriter

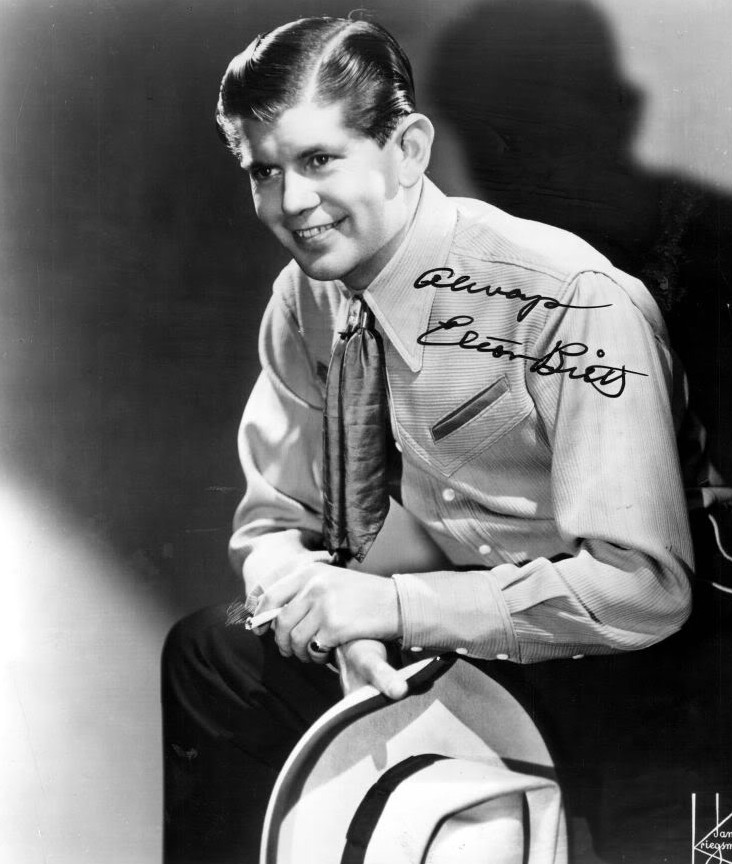
- Britt in March 1950

Background information
- Born: James Elton Baker; June 27, 1913; Marshall, Arkansas, U.S.
- Died: June 22, 1972 (aged 58) McConnellsburg, Pennsylvania, U.S.
- Genre: Country
- Occupations: Singer; songwriter; musician
- Instrument: Guitar
- Years active: 1942–1970

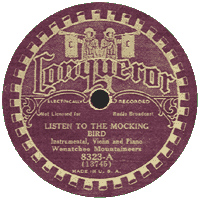
"Listen to the Mocking Bird" record label

Elton Britt (born James Elton Baker; June 27, 1913 – June 22, 1972) was an American country music singer, songwriter, and musician, who was best known for his western ballads and yodelling songs.

== Biography ==
Britt was born on a farm near Marshall, Arkansas. His father was James Baker, and he had two younger sisters, Gretta Sanders and Druse Baker, and a younger brother Arl Baker.

Britt was born incredibly sick, and therefore wasn’t named until he was over a year old, however he was eventually given the name James, after his father and his middle name, Elton, after the man who looked after his health as a baby. Because of his poor health, Britt was allegedly spoiled copiously as a baby and was given the nickname “cute.”

Britt started playing guitar aged 10, most likely inspired by his family who all also had an interest in music, and eventually Britt would discover Jimmie Rodgers, which inspired him to learn to yodel, which he learned to do exceptionally well, his breath control being so good that he could often hold his breath for minutes at a time underwater.

Britt’s career kickstarted in 1930 when Britt was hired to replace Hugh Ashley (or Hobart Walton) in singing group The Beverly Hill Billies. Britt came up with his stage name after someone hired at The Beverly Hill Billies production company said that James Baker didn’t sound “hill-billy enough.”

Britt recorded over 600 sides and 60 albums for RCA Victor and other labels in more than a 30-year span, and is best known for such hit songs (several of which he wrote or co-wrote) as "Someday (You'll Want Me to Want You)", "Detour", "Chime Bells", "Maybe I'll Cry Over You", "Pinto Pal", and the million-selling wartime hit "There's a Star-Spangled Banner Waving Somewhere". The recording had sold a million discs by 1944 and it was awarded a gold disc by the RIAA. Britt became the first country artist to be awarded a gold disc. He would also partner with fellow yodeller and country singer, Rosalie Allen, going on to record multiple songs and albums together.

A singer, bandleader, radio and television performer, songwriter and yodeler, he starred in at least two films in the late 1940s, and had hit records as late as 1968 with "The Jimmie Rodgers Blues".

Britt would take frequent but temporary retirements, during one of which he briefly made a career mining uranium in Western America, leading his then wife, Penny to write the song "Uranium Fever", which in 1955 he would go on to sing. Britt briefly ran for the Democratic presidential nomination in 1960, something many believe was a publicity stunt pulled by his then-manager, Aubrey Mayhew.

Britt has a star on the Hollywood Walk of Fame, given on February 8, 1960.

On June 22, 1972, five days before his 59th birthday, Britt suffered a heart attack while driving his car and died in a McConnellsburg, Pennsylvania, hospital the next day. He was buried in the Odd Fellows Cemetery in Broad Top, Pennsylvania.

== In popular culture ==
His song "Uranium Fever" is featured in the Bethesda Softworks video game Fallout 4 on the in-game radio station Diamond City Radio. The song would again be featured in the Fallout adaptation on Amazon Prime Video in the season two episode "The Other Player".

== Discography ==
=== Albums ===
Year	Album	US Country	Label
1955	Presenting Elton Britt		Universal Digital Enterprises
1956	Yodel Songs		RCA Victor
1959	The Wandering Cowboy		ABC
1960	Beyond the Sunset		ABC
1960	I Heard a Forest Praying		ABC
1963	The Best 1		RCA Victor
1965	Singing Hills		ABC
1966	Somethin' for Everyone	31	ABC
1968	The Jimmie Rodgers Blues		RCA Camden
1970	Sings Modern Country		Certron
1972	The Best 2		RCA Victor
1972	16 Great Country Performances		ABC
1983	Days of the Yodeling Cowboys		Cowgirlboy
1984	More Days of the Yodeling Cowboys		Cowgirlboy
1986	Star Spangled Stardust		Cowgirlboy

=== Singles ===
Year	Single	Chart Positions	
Year	Single	US Country	US
1942	"There's a Star-Spangled Banner Waving Somewhere"		7
1945	"I'm a Convict with Old Glory in My Heart"	7	
1946	"Someday (You'll Want Me to Want You)"	2	
1946	"Wave to Me, My Lady"	3	19
1946	"Blueberry Lane"	4	
1946	"Detour"	5	
1946	"Blue Texas Moonlight" (w/ The Skytoppers)	6	
1946	"Gotta Get Together with My Gal"	4	
1947	"Blue Eyes Crying in the Rain" (w / The Skytoppers)		
1948	"Bells" (w/ The Skytoppers)	6	
1949	"Candy Kisses" (w/ The Skytoppers)	4	
1950	"Beyond the Sunset" (w/ The Three Suns & Rosalie Allen)	7	
1950	"Quicksilver" (w/ Rosalie Allen)	3	
1952	"The Rovin' Gambler"		
1956	"Cannonball Yodel"	-	
1966	"Homesweet Homesick Blues"	-	
1968	"The Jimmie Rodgers Blues"	26	
1969	"The Bitter Taste"	71	
