= Rainbow at Midnight =

"Rainbow at Midnight" is a song written by Lost John Miller. The song originally made the Juke Box Folk chart when it was recorded by The Carlisle Brothers in 1946. "Rainbow at Midnight" reached number five on the Juke Box Folk chart.

== Cover versions ==
- A few weeks after the Carlisle Brothers release, Ernest Tubb had his third number one on the Juke Box Folk chart with his version of "Rainbow at Midnight".
- Jimmie Rodgers had a single release of "Rainbow at Midnight" in 1962 which charted at #62.
- George Hamilton IV recorded the song for his May 1965 album release Mister Sincerity - A Tribute to Ernest Tubb.
- Webb Pierce recorded the song for his September 1965 album release Country Music Time.
- Gene Vincent recorded the song in 1969 for his 1970 album release I'm Back and I'm Proud.
- Blues musician James 'Son' Thomas recorded the song (as "After The War") on his 1987 Rustron LP 1001 Gateway To The Delta.

Preceded by "Divorce Me C.O.D." by Merle Travis	Most Played Juke Box Folk Records number one single by Ernest Tubb; January 18, 1947	Succeeded by "So Round, So Firm, So Fully Packed" by Merle Travis
