= Johnny Bond =

American country singer-songwriter (1915–1978)

Background information
- Born: Cyrus Whitfield Bond; June 1, 1915
- Origin: Enville, Oklahoma, U.S.
- Died: June 12, 1978 (aged 63) Burbank, California, U.S.
- Genres: Country
- Occupation(s): Singer-songwriter, composer
- Instrument: Guitar
- Years active: 1940–1977
- Labels: Columbia, Starday

Cyrus Whitfield "Johnny" Bond (June 1, 1915 – June 12, 1978) was an American country music singer-songwriter, guitarist and composer and publisher, who co-founded a music publishing firm. He was active in the music industry from 1940 until the late 1970s.

== Early years ==
Bond was born in Enville, Oklahoma, and grew up on several small farms in Oklahoma. As a youngster, he was influenced musically by records that his parents played. He learned basics of music as a member of his high school's brass band. While in high school he bought a ukulele, but soon he switched to playing the guitar.

== Performing ==
Bond first performed on radio in Oklahoma City when he was 19 years old. In 1937, he began performing with Jimmy Wakely and Scotty Harrell in the Bell Boys trio, named after the Bell Clothing Company, which sponsored the group on radio station WKY in Oklahoma City, Oklahoma. He went on to join Gene Autry's Melody Ranch in 1940.

He also performed with his own group, the Red River Valley Boys.

The Encyclopedia of Country Music says that the Bond-Wakely-Harrell trio "pulled a clever musical scam" by recording for two companies under different names: the Jimmy Wakely Trio (for Decca Records) and Johnny Bond & the Cimarron Boys (for Columbia Records).

Bond also acted in more than 40 films, beginning with Saga of Death Valley (1939) and including Wilson and Duel in the Sun.

Beginning in 1953, Bond and Tex Ritter were hosts of the syndicated country music television series Town Hall Party, which lasted seven years.

== Recording ==
Bond's first solo recordings came with Columbia Records in 1937. He is best known for his 1947 hit "Divorce Me C.O.D.", one of his seven top ten hits on the Billboard country charts. In 1965 at age 50 he scored the biggest hit of his career with the comic "Ten Little Bottles", which spent four weeks at No. 2. Bond's other hits include "So Round, So Firm, So Fully Packed" (1947), "Oklahoma Waltz" (1948), "Love Song in 32 Bars" (1950), "Sick Sober and Sorry" (1951), and a cover of Charlie Ryan's "Hot Rod Lincoln" (1960).

== Composing and publishing ==
The hundreds of songs that Bond wrote include "Cimarron" and "Ten Little Bottles". He and Ritter formed Vidor Publications, a music publishing firm. He retired from performing in the 1970s to devote more time to publishing music.

== Death ==
Bond died of a stroke in 1978, at the age of 63.

== Recognition ==
Bond was elected to the Country Music Hall of Fame in 1999, and to the Nashville Songwriters Hall of Fame.

== In popular culture ==
Bond's song "Stars of the Midnight Range" was featured in the role-playing video game, Fallout: New Vegas. Another song of his; "Headin' Down the Wrong Highway" was on the radio in the game Fallout 76.

== Discography ==
=== Albums ===
| Year | Album | Chart Positions | | Label |
| Year | Album | US Country | US | Label |
|---|---|---|---|---|
| 1960 | Hot Rod Lincoln | — | — | |
| 1961 | That Wild, Wicked but Wonderful West | — | — | Starday |
| 1962 | Live It Up and Laugh It Up | — | — | Starday |
| 1963 | Songs That Made Him Famous | — | — | Starday |
| 1965 | Ten Little Bottles | 12 | 142 | Starday |
| 1966 | Famous Hot Rodders I Have Known | — | — | Starday |
| 1966 | The Man Who Comes Around | — | — | Starday |
| 1966 | Bottles Up | — | — | Starday |
| 1966 | The Branded Stock of Johnny Bond | — | — | Starday |
| 1967 | Ten Nights in a Barroom | — | — | Starday |
| 1967 | Sick, Sober and Sorry | — | — | Starday |
| 1967 | Drink Up and Go Home | — | — | Starday |
| 1968 | Three Sheets in the Wind | — | — | Starday |
| 1969 | The Best of Johnny Bond | — | — | Starday |
| 1970 | Something Old, New, Patriotic and Blue | — | — | Starday |
| 1971 | Here Come the Elephants | — | — | Starday |

=== Singles ===
| Year | Single | Chart Positions | | Album |
| Year | Single | US Country | US | Album |
|---|---|---|---|---|
| 1947 | "Divorce Me C.O.D." | 3 | — | singles only |
| 1947 | "So Round, So Firm, So Fully Packed" | 5 | — | singles only |
| 1947 | "You Brought Sorrow to My Heart" | 3 | — | singles only |
| 1947 | "The Daughter of Jole Blon" | 4 | — | singles only |
| 1948 | "Oklahoma Waltz" | 9 | — | singles only |
| 1949 | "Till the End of the World" | 12 | — | singles only |
| 1949 | "Tennessee Saturday Night" | 11 | — | singles only |
| 1950 | "Love Song in 32 Beers" | 8 | — | singles only |
| 1951 | "Sick, Sober and Sorry" | 7 | — | singles only |
| 1960 | "Hot Rod Lincoln" | — | 26 | Hot Rod Lincoln |
| 1963 | "Three Sheets in the Wind" | 30 | — | Hot Rod Lincoln |
| 1965 | "10 Little Bottles" | 2 | 43 | Ten Little Bottles |
| 1971 | "Here Come the Elephants" | 59 | — | Here Come the Elephants |
