= Smoke! Smoke! Smoke! (That Cigarette) =

1947 song by Merle Travis and Tex Williams

Single by Tex Williams and His Western Caravan
- B-side: "Roundup Polka"
- Published: June 27, 1947 by American Music, Inc., Hollywood
- Released: July 1947
- Recorded: March 27, 1947
- Studio: Radio Recorders, Los Angeles
- Genre: Western swing; novelty
- Length: 2:56
- Label: Capitol Americana 40001
- Songwriters: Merle Travis and Tex Williams
- Producer: Lee Gillette

"Smoke! Smoke! Smoke! (That Cigarette)" is a Western swing novelty song written by Merle Travis and Tex Williams, for Williams and his talking blues style of singing. Travis wrote the bulk of the song. The original Williams version went to number one for 16 non-consecutive weeks on the Hot Country Songs chart and became a #1 hit in August 1947 and remained at the top of the "Best Sellers in Stores" chart for six weeks. It was written in 1947 and recorded on March 27, 1947, at Radio Recorders in Hollywood.

== Synopsis ==
The song is written in the talking blues style in the mid 1940s. Its narrator expresses disdain for the inventor of the cigarette, not so much for its health concerns (as he says he is a smoker himself and it hasn't killed him yet) but because of its addictive effect on smokers. He goes on to describe two situations, a tense poker game and a date with a beautiful woman; each situation is interrupted at a crucial point when one of the participants stops to have a cigarette. Williams sarcastically quips that when the smoker eventually dies from the effects of the addiction, they will tell Saint Peter that they need one more smoke before going through the golden gate.

== Personnel ==
"Smoke! Smoke! Smoke! (That Cigarette)" was produced by Lee Gillette, and featured Johnny Weis, electric lead guitar; Eugene "Smokey" Rogers, acoustic rhythm guitar, harmony vocal; Earl "Joaquin" Murphey, steel guitar; Manny Klein, trumpet; Paul "Spike" Featherstone, harp; Andrew "Cactus" Soldi, Harry Sims, Rex Call, fiddles; Ossie Godson, piano; Deuce Spriggens, bass fiddle, harmony vocal; Milton "Muddy" Berry, drums; and Larry "Pedro" DePaul, accordion.

== Cover versions ==
A cover version performed by Phil Harris stayed on the charts for 4 weeks, reaching #8 on the "Best Sellers in Stores" chart. Williams made a stereophonic re-recording of the song for Capitol in 1960 on the album, Smoke! Smoke! Smoke!. It has also been covered by Johnny Bond & His Red River Valley Boys in 1947, and by Sammy Davis Jr., who hit # 89 on the Country Charts in 1982, Willie Nelson, Dennis Weaver, Michael Nesmith, Hank Thompson, Jimmy Dean, Commander Cody (Billboard #94 in 1973), Asleep at the Wheel, Doc Watson and others. Thom Bresh, the son of the song's writer Merle Travis, hit #78 on the Country Charts with the song in 1978.
