= Al Dexter =

American singer-songwriter (1905–1984)

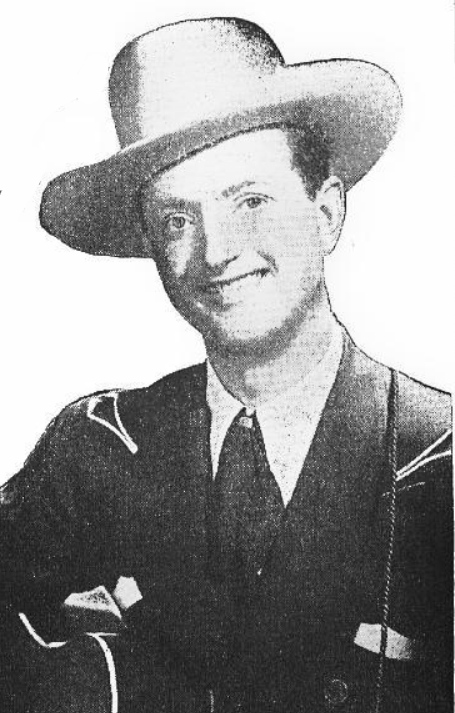

Background information
- Born: Clarence Albert Poindexter; May 4, 1905; Jacksonville, Texas, U.S.
- Died: January 28, 1984 (aged 78) Lewisville, Texas, U.S.
- Genres: Country
- Occupation: Singer-songwriter
- Instrument: Guitar
- Years active: 1936–1968
- Website: Archived Al Dexter Website

Clarence Albert Poindexter (May 4, 1905 – January 28, 1984), known best as Al Dexter, was an American country musician and songwriter.

He is best known today for his most popular song, "Pistol Packin' Mama", a 1943 hit which was one of the most popular recordings of the World War II years, and later became a hit again with a cover by Bing Crosby and the Andrews Sisters.

== Biography ==
Born in Jacksonville, Texas, United States, Dexter owned a bar in the 1930s and helped popularize the style of country music known as honky tonk. He made his recording debut on November 28, 1936, for ARC Records. and was probably the first artist to ever use the term "honky tonk" in a country song when he recorded "Honky Tonk Blues" at his first session.

His self-penned hit, "Pistol Packin' Mama", became the 1943 marching chorus of the New York Yankees. The 1943 movie of the same name, made by Republic Pictures, gave Dexter close to $250,000 in royalties. Another hit from the 1940s was "Guitar Polka", which entered Billboard's list as the "Most Played Juke Box Folk Record" for 16 weeks running in 1946. Other hits include "So Long Pal", "Triflin' Gal", "I'm Losing My Mind Over You" and "Too Late to Worry, Too Blue to Cry."

Dexter was the first country singer to perform on Broadway, and in 1971, was inducted into the Nashville Songwriters Hall of Fame.

He died on January 28, 1984, in Lewisville, Texas.

On August 21, 2010, Dexter was inducted into the Texas Country Music Hall Of Fame, located in Carthage, Texas. Other inductees that night were George Jones along with composer Ray Winkler.

Following Al Dexter's death in 1984, his family discovered 50 master tapes containing studio recordings. In 2010, Al Dexter's son, Carl Wayne Poindexter, released the three-disc CD box set entitled Al Dexter's Found Masters Volume 1–3 on his independent record label, Al Dexter Estate Productions. This professionally produced collection contained digitally re-mastered studio recordings which were made by Dexter with various band line-ups and configurations.

== Discography ==
=== Albums ===
Year	Single	Label
1954	Songs of the Southwest	Columbia
1961	Pistol Packin' Mama	Harmony
1962	Sings and Plays His Greatest Hits	Capitol
1968	The Original Pistol Packin' Mama	Hilltop

=== Singles ===
Year	Single	Chart Positions	
Year	Single	US Country	US
1936	"Honky Tonk Blues"		
1937	"Honky Tonk Baby"		
1939	"Jelly Roll Special"		
1939	"My Troubles Don't Trouble Me No More"		
1939	"Daddy's In The Doghouse Now"	4	
1941	"Down At The Roadside Inn"		
1941	"The Money You Spent Was Mine"		
1941	"You Will Always Be My Darling"		
1941	"Darling, It's All Over Now"		
1941	"Meet Me Down In Honky Tonk Town"		
1942	"Honky Tonk Chinese Dime"		
1943	"Pistol Packin' Mama"	1	1
1943	"Rosalita"	1	22
1944	"So Long Pal"	1	
1944	"Too Late to Worry, Too Blue to Cry"	1	18
1945	"I'm Losing My Mind Over You"	1	
1945	"I'll Wait for You Dear"	2	
1945	"Triflin' Gal"	2	
1945	"I'm Lost Without You"	5	
1946	"Guitar Polka"	1	16
1946	"Honey Do You Think It's Wrong"	2	
1946	"Wine Women and Song"	1	
1946	"It's Up to You"	3	
1947	"Kokomo Island"	4	
1947	"Down at the Roadside Inn"	4	
1948	"Rock and Rye Rag"	14	
1948	"Calico Rag"	11	

== Bibliography ==
- Peter La Chapelle, Proud To Be An Okie, University of California Press, 2007
- Tony Russell, Country Music Originals: The Legends and the Lost, Oxford University Press, 2007
- Tony Russell, Bob Pinson, Country Music Records: A Discography 1921–1942, Oxford University Press, 2004
