= Music of Kentucky =

The Music of Kentucky is heavily centered on Appalachian folk music and its descendants, especially in eastern Kentucky. Bluegrass music is of particular regional importance; Bill Monroe, "the father of bluegrass music", was born in the Ohio County community of Rosine, and he named his band, the Blue Grass Boys, after the bluegrass state, i.e., Kentucky. Travis picking, the influential guitar style, is named after Merle Travis, born and raised in Muhlenberg County. Kentucky is home to the Country Music Highway (Highway 23), which extends from Portsmouth, Ohio, to the Virginia border in Pike County.

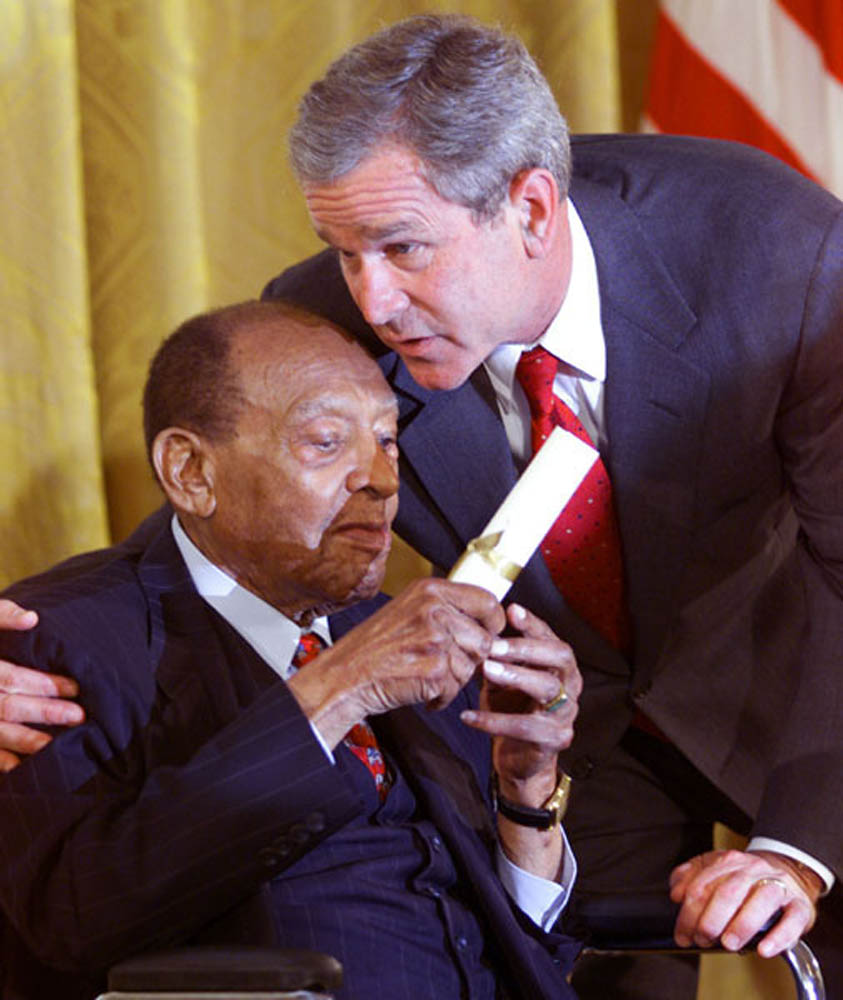
Lionel Hampton with President George W. Bush

== Music venues and institutions ==
Renfro Valley (near Richmond) is home to Renfro Valley Entertainment Center and the Kentucky Music Hall of Fame and is known as "Kentucky's Country Music Capital", a designation given it by the Kentucky State Legislature in the late 1980s. The Renfro Valley Barn Dance was where Renfro Valley's musical heritage began, in 1939, and influential country music luminaries like Red Foley, Homer & Jethro, Lily May Ledford & the Original Coon Creek Girls, Martha Carson, and many others have performed as regular members of the shows there over the years. The Renfro Valley Gatherin' is today America's second oldest continually broadcast radio program of any kind. It is broadcast on local radio station WRVK and a syndicated network of nearly 200 other stations across the United States and Canada every week.

Major music venues in Kentucky include the Paramount Arts Center in Ashland. There is also Sturgill's Music Center in Tom T. Hall's hometown of Olive Hill. Just south of Olive Hill is Sandy Hook, the boyhood home of Keith Whitley, whose house is now a museum, exhibited in conjunction with the annual Tobacco Festival. The Kentucky Opry in Prestonsburg is a major institution, using the Mountain Arts Center. Louisville is home to the West Point Country Opry, while the city of Owensboro is a major bluegrass center, and is home to the International Bluegrass Music Association. In the capital city, Frankfort, there is the Kentucky Coffeetree Cafe. The cafe is an intimate venue that features some of the top national and regional bluegrass, Americana and folk artists. The Rosemary Clooney House in Augusta pays homage to the life and career of this favorite daughter of Maysville.

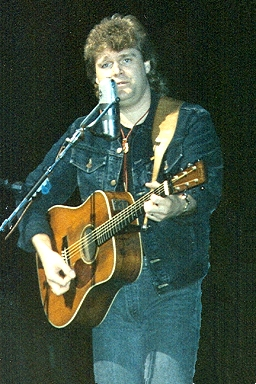
Ricky Skaggs

== Festivals ==
Singers gather annually at Benton on the fourth Sunday in May to sing from a shape note hymn and tune book called The Southern Harmony, and Musical Companion. This event, first organized in 1884 and called The Big Singing or Big Singing Day, is considered by many to be the oldest indigenous musical tradition in the United States. It was organized by James Roberts Lemon, a newspaper owner and publisher in western Kentucky.

Ashland is also home to the Summer Motion festival and Poage Landing Days, while Olive Hill also hosts the International Strange Music Weekend and the Shriner's Bluegrass Festival. The Renfro Valley Barn Dance has been held in Renfro Valley since 1939. Owensboro has ROMP (River Of Music Party) the last part of June every year. Other festivals include the Forkland Heritage Festival and Revue in Gravel Switch.

Lexington is host to the oldest bluegrass music festival in the state. The Festival of the Bluegrass is held every June at the Kentucky Horse Park and considered one of the premier traditional bluegrass festivals in the country.

Wilmore, Kentucky is home to the Ichthus Music Festival. Ichthus is a Christian music festival held each year on the Ichthus Farm. Notable bands such as Switchfoot, Relient K, Pillar, and P.O.D. have all played at past Ichthus festivals.

Mount Sterling is home to the Gateway Music Festival.

Boomslang: A Celebration of Sound & Art is an annual multi-venue music festival in Lexington, sponsored by the University of Kentucky's college radio station, WRFL. The festival is an extension of WRFL's mission to provide a platform for non-mainstream, non-commercial music and other programming not found elsewhere in the region, featuring a variety of artists from both the region and from around the world. Genres tend to be experimental in nature, but have included everything from alternative rock, post-rock, electronic, hip-hop, punk rock, metal, and psychedelic rock bands. Other festival features have included dance performances, local craft booths, fashion and art installations, workshops, literary events and film screenings, with a special focus on the artists and arts organizers that make Lexington unique.

Louisville hosts the Forecastle Festival each July since 2002, which has featured Louisville's My Morning Jacket, Bowling Green's Cage the Elephant, and Lexington's Sturgill Simpson. The Forecastle Festival features a Kentucky Bourbon Lodge.

== History ==
In the 1830s, a Great Awakening of fervent Christianity began, leading to popular spiritual song traditions. During this period, the country was undergoing a religious revival that was centered on itinerant preachers called circuit riders, and outdoor worship gatherings (camp meetings) where hymns (camp songs) were sung. Earlier in the century, the first camp meeting was held in July 1800 in Logan County. In 1801, a meeting in Cane Ridge in Bourbon County lasted for six days and attracted ten to twenty thousand people.

In 1916, Loraine Wyman and Howard Brockway collected Kentucky folk music which they published in two folios:

- Lonesome Tunes: Folk Songs from the Kentucky Mountains (1917, New York)
- Twenty Kentucky Mountain Songs (1920, Boston).

Louisville is known for producing some of the earliest jug band music, and celebrates the fact with the annual National Jug Band Jubilee in mid-September.

== Selected musicians from Kentucky ==
- Marshall Allen, jazz, born in Louisville
- Audio Adrenaline, a Christian rock band formed at Kentucky Christian University in Grayson
- Bleach, a Christian rock band formed at Kentucky Christian University in Grayson
- Kenny Bishop, born and raised in Richmond
- Black Stone Cherry, formed in Edmonton
- Jimmy Blythe, boogie-woogie and jazz pianist, born in Louisville
- Sam Bush, Bluegrass Hall of Fame inductee from Bowling Green
- Athena Cage, born and raised in Logan County
- Cage the Elephant, formed in Bowling Green (Had a number two Billboard 200 album with Thank You, Happy Birthday in 2011. Have had ten number one songs on the Alternative Songs chart in the 2010s). Were on the lineup for Woodstock 50.
- Steven Curtis Chapman, born and raised in Paducah
- Rosemary Clooney, born and raised in Maysville
- Jimmy Coe, jazz saxophonist, born in Tompkinsville
- John Conlee, born in Versailles and raised in rural Woodford County
- Cousin Emmy, born in Barren County
- J. D. Crowe, born in Lexington
- Bobby Osborne, born in Thousandsticks
- Billy Ray Cyrus, born in Flatwoods. Had a number one Billboard 200 album with Some Gave All in 1992. He was featured on rapper Lil Nas X's number one Hot 100 hit "Old Town Road" in 2019.
- Skeeter Davis, first woman ever nominated for a country music Grammy Award (1959), had a number two hit on the Billboard Hot 100 with "The End of the World" in 1963, from Grant County (d. 2004)
- Days of the New, alternative acoustic band from Louisville
- Jackie DeShannon, born in Hazel in Calloway County
- Todd Duncan, opera singer, born in Danville
- Emarosa, formed in Lexington in 2006
- The Everly Brothers, with family roots in Muhlenberg County (older brother Don was born there)
- Exile, formed in Richmond
- Jim Ford, singer songwriter, Johnson County
- Mark Fosson, guitarist and songwriter, born in Ashland
- Steve Gorman, drummer for The Black Crowes born and raised in Hopkinsville
- Porter Grainger, blues pianist, born in Bowling Green
- Gravel Switch, southern fueled rock band from Jamestown
- Halfway to Hazard, Country outfit out of Hazard
- Tom T. Hall, born and raised in Olive Hill
- Lionel Hampton, born in Louisville
- Jack Harlow, rapper from Louisville, has had 3 number ones like "First Class" on the Billboard Hot 100 in 2022
- Jimmy Harrison, jazz trombonist, born in Louisville
- Edgar Hayes, jazz pianist and bandleader, born in Lexington
- Hearts of Saints, Christian rock band based out of Hopkinsville
- Richard Hell, born in Lexington
- Rosa Henderson, blues and jazz singer, born in Henderson
- Roscoe Holcomb, from Daisy, old-time banjo, guitar and harmonica player and singer, who inspired the phrase "high, lonesome sound" for mountain music
- Helen Humes, singer, born in Louisville
- The Infected, Punk rock group formed in Lexington. Founders of Eugene Records punk label
- Grandpa Jones
- Kennedy Jones, guitarist, Muhlenberg County
- The Judds, from Ashland (Naomi Judd d. 2022)
- Kentucky Blue Collar Band, country rock band from Morgan County
- The Kentucky Headhunters, formed in Metcalfe County, where most of the original members grew up
- Bradley Kincaid
- Andy Kirk, jazz, Newport
- Chris Knight, Country singer/songwriter from Slaughters.
- Knocked Loose, hardcore band from Oldham County, Kentucky.
- Nick Lachey, Lead singer of 98 Degrees from Harlan
- Lily May Ledford, early country musician from Powell County, member of Coon Creek Girls
- Legendary Shack Shakers, formed in Paducah
- Lethal, formed in Hebron
- Brian Littrell of the Backstreet Boys, born and raised in Lexington
- Patty Loveless, born in Elkhorn City, Kentucky and raised in Louisville
- Loretta Lynn, (d. 2022) the "Queen of Country" and her younger sister Crystal Gayle, both from Van Lear in Johnson County. Portrayed in the film Coal Miner's Daughter.
- Bobby Mackey, born in Concord
- Fate Marable, jazz pianist and bandleader, born in Paducah
- Sara Martin, blues singer, born in Louisville
- Matty Matlock, jazz clarinetist, saxophonist, and arranger, born in Paducah
- Mark Melloan, singer-songwriter from Elizabethtown
- John Michael Montgomery, born in Danville and raised in Garrard County. Had a number one Billboard 200 album in 1994.
- Montgomery Gentry, consisting of John Michael Montgomery's older brother Eddie Montgomery and Lexington native Troy Gentry (d. 2017)
- Bill Monroe, born and raised in Rosine (d. 1996, buried in Rosine)
- The Muckrakers, Rock band from Louisville
- My Morning Jacket, Louisville-based band. Psychedelic, alternative, Southern rock. Had a number five album on the Billboard 200 with Circuital in 2011.
- Nappy Roots, alternative Southern hip-hop, formed in Bowling Green
- John Jacob Niles, folksinger and composer born in Louisville
- Will Oldham, folk & indie musician, born in Louisville
- Osborne Brothers, bluegrass, from Hyden
- Joan Osborne, singer and songwriter from Anchorage, Kentucky
- Carly Pearce country singer
- Julia Perry, classical composer, born in Lexington
- Panopticon, formed in Louisville
- Rachel's, Louisville band
- Amanda Randolph, singer and pianist, born in Louisville
- Jimmy Raney, jazz guitarist, Louisville
- Mose Rager, guitarist, Ohio County
- Martha Redbone, Harlan County
- Kevin Richardson of Backstreet Boys, born in Lexington and raised near Irvine in Estill County
- Jean Ritchie, folksinger, born in Viper
- Rodan, Louisville band
- Seabird, Christian/Alternative rock band from Independence
- Arnold Shultz, guitarist and fiddler, Ohio County
- Static Major, R&B, born and raised in Louisville (d. 2008) featured on Lil Wayne's number one Hot 100 hit "Lollipop"
- Sturgill Simpson, born in Jackson (Had a number three album on the Billboard 200 in 2016. Grammy-nominated for album of the year.)
- Sleeper Agent, alternative band from Bowling Green. Toured with Cage the Elephant.
- Slint, a rock band formed in Louisville
- Ricky Skaggs, born and raised in Lawrence County
- Chris Stapleton, country rock, Paintsville. Had a number one Billboard 200 album in 2015. Grammy-nominated for album of the year.
- Gary Stewart, born in Jenkins
- Bryson Tiller, rapper from Louisville. Had a number one Billboard 200 album in 2017 with True to Self.
- Too Close to Touch, a post-hardcore band based out of Lexington
- Merle Travis, Rosewood
- Villebillies, formed in Louisville
- Keith Whitley, born and raised in Sandy Hook (d. 1989)
- Edith Wilson, blues singer, born in Louisville
- Dwight Yoakam, born in Pikeville
