= Culture of Kentucky =

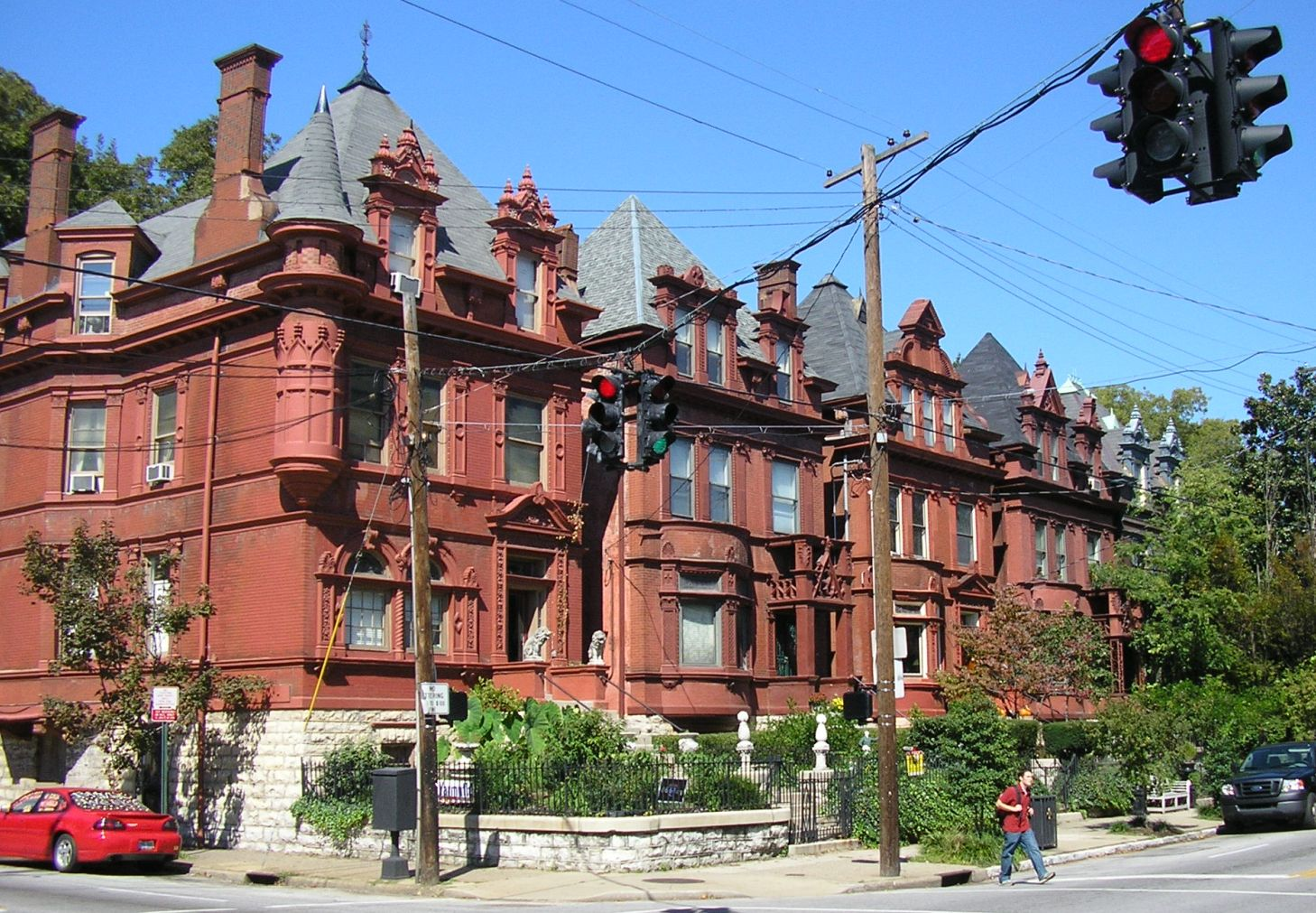
Old Louisville is the largest Victorian Historic neighborhood in the United States.

The culture of Kentucky is Southern and influenced by Southern Appalachia, blending with the native upper Southern culture in certain areas of the state. The state is known for bourbon and whiskey distilling, tobacco, horse racing, college basketball, College Football, quilts.

== Cultural history ==
Kentucky is more similar to the Upper South in terms of ancestry which is predominantly American (meaning that only this ancestry was specified by respondents to the US Census). Nevertheless, during the 19th century, Kentucky did receive a substantial number of German immigrants, who settled mostly in the Midwest and parts of the Upper South, along the Ohio river primarily in Louisville, Maysville, Covington, and Newport. Only Maryland, Delaware, and West Virginia have higher German ancestry percentages than Kentucky among Census-defined Southern states, although Kentucky's percentage is relatively smaller than the previously named states' percentages.

Kentucky was a slave state, and black people once comprised over one-quarter of its population. However, it lacked the cotton plantation system though it did support significant and large scale tobacco plantation systems in the western and central parts of the state more similar to the plantations developed in Virginia and North Carolina than those in the Deep South, and never had the same high percentage of African Americans as most other slave states, with less than 8% of its current population being black, Kentucky has a relatively significant rural African American population in the Central and Western areas of the state. Kentucky adopted the Jim Crow system of racial segregation in most public spheres after the Civil War, but the state never disenfranchised African American citizens to the level of the Deep South states. Integration of Kentucky's public schools was mostly peaceful after the 1954 Brown v. Board of Education verdict, later adopting the first state civil rights act in the South in 1966. Notable exceptions, however, occurred in 1956 in Sturgis, Kentucky and Clay, Kentucky, with Governor A. B. "Happy" Chandler activating the Kentucky National Guard and Kentucky State Police to maintain law and order during integration of public schools and lawsuits being filed to enforce desegregation.

The biggest day in horse racing, the Kentucky Derby, is preceded by the two-week Kentucky Derby Festival in Louisville. Louisville also plays host to the Kentucky State Fair and the Kentucky Shakespeare Festival. Owensboro, Kentucky's fourth largest city, gives credence to its nickname of "Barbecue Capital of the World" by hosting the annual International Bar-B-Q Festival. Bowling Green, Kentucky's third largest city and home to the only assembly plant in the world that manufactures the Chevrolet Corvette, opened the National Corvette Museum in 1994.

Old Louisville, the largest historic preservation district in the United States featuring Victorian architecture and the third largest overall, hosts the St. James Court Art Show, the largest outdoor art show in the United States. The neighborhood was also home to the Southern Exposition (1883–1887), which featured the first public display of Thomas Edison's light bulb, and was the setting of Alice Hegan Rice's novel, Mrs. Wiggs of the Cabbage Patch and Fontaine Fox's comic strip, the "Toonerville Trolley.

The more rural communities are not without traditions of their own, however. Fairview was the birthplace of Jefferson Davis who would become President of the Confederate States of America and had the Jefferson Davis Memorial a 351 foot concrete obelisk built in 1917. Hodgenville, the birthplace of Abraham Lincoln, hosts the annual Lincoln Days Celebration, and will also host the kick-off for the National Abraham Lincoln Bicentennial Celebration in February 2008. Bardstown celebrates its heritage as a major bourbon-producing region with the Kentucky Bourbon Festival. (Legend holds that Baptist minister Elijah Craig invented bourbon with his black slave in Georgetown, but some dispute this claim.) Glasgow mimics Glasgow, Scotland by hosting the Glasgow Highland Games, its own version of the Highland Games, and Sturgis hosts "Little Sturgis", a mini version of Sturgis, South Dakota's annual Sturgis Motorcycle Rally. The residents of tiny Benton even pay tribute to their favorite tuber, the sweet potato, by hosting Tater Day. Residents of Clarkson in Grayson County celebrate their city's ties to the honey industry by celebrating the Clarkson Honeyfest. The Clarkson Honeyfest is held the last Thursday, Friday and Saturday in September, and is the "Official State Honey Festival of Kentucky."

The state is famous for quilts. The National Quilt Museum is in Paducah. It hosts QuiltWeek, an annual competition and celebration of that attracts artists and hobbyists from the world of quilting.

== Music ==
Renfro Valley, Kentucky, is home to Renfro Valley Entertainment Center and the Kentucky Music Hall of Fame and is known as "Kentucky's Country Music Capital," a designation given it by the Kentucky State Legislature in the late 1980s. The Renfro Valley Barn Dance was where Renfro Valley's musical heritage began, in 1939, and influential country music luminaries like Red Foley, Homer & Jethro, Lily May Ledford & the Original Coon Creek Girls, Martha Carson, and many others have performed as regular members of the shows there over the years. The Renfro Valley Gatherin' is today America's second oldest continually broadcast radio program of any kind. It is broadcast on local radio station WRVK and a syndicated network of nearly 200 other stations across the United States and Canada every week.

Contemporary Christian music star Steven Curtis Chapman is a Paducah native, and Rock and Roll Hall of Famers The Everly Brothers are closely connected with Muhlenberg County, where older brother Don was born. Kentucky was also home to Mildred and Patty Hill, the Louisville sisters credited with composing the tune to the ditty Happy Birthday to You in 1893; Loretta Lynn (Johnson County), and Billy Ray Cyrus (Flatwoods). However, its depth lies in its signature sound — Bluegrass music. Bill Monroe, "The Father of Bluegrass", was born in the small Ohio County town of Rosine, while Ricky Skaggs, Keith Whitley, David "Stringbean" Akeman, Louis Marshall "Grandpa" Jones, Sonny and Bobby Osborne, and Sam Bush (who has been compared to Monroe) all hail from Kentucky. The International Bluegrass Music Museum is located in Owensboro, while the annual Festival of the Bluegrass is held in Lexington.

Kentucky is also home to famed jazz musician and pioneer Lionel Hampton (although this has been disputed in recent years). Blues legend W.C. Handy and R&B singer Wilson Pickett also spent considerable time in Kentucky. The pop bands Midnight Star and Nappy Roots were both formed in Kentucky, as were country acts The Kentucky Headhunters, Montgomery Gentry and Halfway to Hazard, as well as Dove Award-winning Christian groups Audio Adrenaline (rock) and Bride (metal). Though Kentucky is not known for its hip-hop scene, a few notable artists come from the state, including Jack Harlow, Bryson Tiller, and EST Gee. Kentucky is also home to a vibrant underground rap scene, with local artists like Godhand, Dr. Dundiff, and James Lindsey.

== Cuisine ==
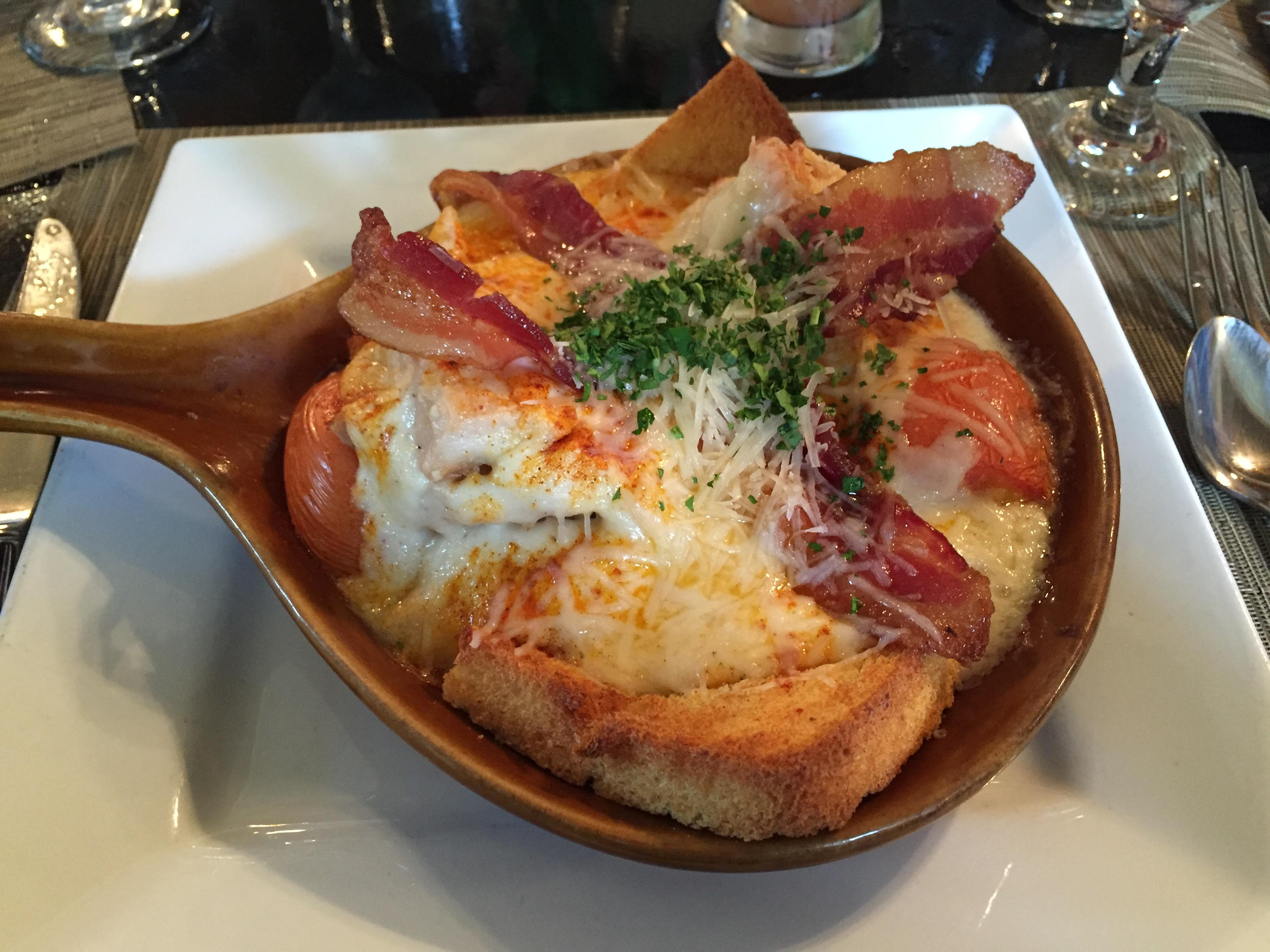
This is an image of the Hot Brown from the Brown Hotel, where the dish was invented.

Kentucky's cuisine is generally similar to and is a part of traditional southern cooking, although in some areas of the state it can blend elements of both the South and Appalachia. One original Kentucky dish is called the Hot Brown, a dish normally layered in this order: toast, turkey, bacon, tomatoes and topped with mornay sauce. It was developed at the Brown Hotel in Louisville. The Pendennis Club in Louisville claims to be the birthplace of the Old Fashioned cocktail. Also, western Kentucky is known for its own regional style of barbecue.

== Collectible bourbon ==
Kentucky, for a variety of reasons, has been a frequent hunting ground for vintage spirits collectors. There are multiple distilleries in the state, and a large number of bourbon distilleries; bourbon in particular is considered highly collectible. Vintage spirits are legal for sale under Kentucky's 2018 Vintage Spirits law, known as House Bill 100; in almost all other US states such sales are illegal.

Kentucky is also fertile ground for collectors because while distillers historically included bourbon in employee compensation packages, Kentucky is part of the Bible Belt, an area of the United States where many disapprove of drinking alcohol. In Kentucky it is not uncommon to find unopened cases dating back decades stored in attics or basements.

== See also ==
- Theater in Kentucky
- Performing arts in Louisville, Kentucky
- List of attractions and events in the Louisville metropolitan area
