= Red Foley discography =

This is the discography for American country musician Red Foley.

== Albums ==
Year	Album	US Country	Label
1951	Red Foley Souvenir Album		Decca
1953	A Tribute to Jimmie Rodgers		Decca
1953	Sing a Song of Christmas		Decca
1954	Lift Up Your Voice		Decca
1955	Beyond the Sunset		Decca
1956	Red and Ernie, Vol. 1 (with Ernest Tubb)		Decca
1956	Red and Ernie, Vol. 2 (with Ernest Tubb)		Decca
1958	Red Foley's Dickies Souvenir Album		Decca
1958	I Believe		Decca
1958	He Walks with Thee		Decca
1958	Beyond the Sunset		Decca
1958	My Keepsake Album		Decca
1959	Let's All Sing with Red Foley		Decca
1961	Rockin' Chair		Decca
1961	Company's Comin'		Decca
1961	Songs of Devotion		Decca
1962	Dear Hearts and Gentle People		Decca
1962	Life's Railroad to Heaven		Decca
1962	Hang Your Head in Shame		Decca
1963	The Red Foley Show		Decca
1963	Rock of Ages		Decca
1964	The Red Foley Story		Decca
1965	I'm Bound for the Kingdom		Decca
1965	Songs Everybody Knows		Decca
1967	Songs for the Soul		Decca
1967	Together Again (with Kitty Wells)	24	
1969	I Believe		

== Singles ==
Year	Single	Chart Positions	
Year	Single	US Country	US
1933	"The Lone Cowboy"	-	-
1933	"Single Life Is Good Enough For Me"	-	-
1934	"I Got The Freight Train Blues"	-	-
1936	"Old Shep"	-	-
1936	"The 1936 Floods"	-	-
1941	"Old Shep"	6	-
1941	"Montana Moon"	5	-
1941	"It Makes No Never Mind"	10	-
1941	"I'll Be Back in a Year"	6	-
1942	"I'm Looking For A Sweetheart"	5	-
1942	"Is It True"	32	-
1944	"Smoke on the Water"	1	7
1944	"There's a Blue Star Shining Bright (In a Window Tonight)"	5	
1945	"Hang Your Head in Shame"	4	-
1945	"I'll Never Let You Worry My Mind"	5	-
1945	"Shame on You" (with Lawrence Welk)	1	13
1945	"At Mail Call Today" (with Lawrence Welk)	3	
1946	"Harriet" (with Roy Ross & His Ramblers)	4	
1946	"Have I Told You Lately That I Love You?" (with Roy Ross & His Ramblers)	5	-
1947	"That's How Much I Love You" (Red Foley and The Cumberland Valley Boys)	4	-
1947	"New Jolie Blonde (New Pretty Blonde)" (Red Foley and The Cumberland Valley Boys)	1	-
1947	"Freight Train Boogie" (Red Foley and The Cumberland Valley Boys)	5	
1947	"Never Trust a Woman" (Red Foley and The Cumberland Valley Boys)	2	
1948	"Tennessee Saturday Night" (Red Foley and The Cumberland Valley Boys)	1	
1949	"Candy Kisses"	4	
1949	"Tennessee Border"	3	
1949	"Blues in My Heart" (with Cumberland Valley Boys)	15	
1949	"Tennessee Polka"	4	
1949	"I'm Throwing Rice (At the Girl I Love)"	11	
1949	"Two Cents, Three Eggs and a Postcard"	8	
1949	"Sunday Down in Tennessee"	3	
1949	"Tennessee Border No. 2" (with Ernest Tubb)	2	
1950	"I Gotta Have My Baby Back"	10	
1950	"Careless Kisses"	8	
1950	"Chattanoogie Shoe Shine Boy"	1	1
1950	"Don't Be Ashamed of Your Age" (with Ernest Tubb)	7	
1950	"Sugarfoot Rag"	4	24
1950	"Steal Away"	9	
1950	"Birmingham Bounce"	1	14
1950	"Choc'late Ice Cream Cone" (with The Dixie Dons)	5	
1950	"Mississippi" (with The Dixie Dons)	1	22
1950	"Just a Closer Walk with Thee" (with The Jordanaires)	9	
1950	"Goodnight Irene" (with Ernest Tubb)	1	10
1950	"Hillbilly Fever No. 2" (with Ernest Tubb)	9	
1950	"Cincinnati Dancing Pig"	2	7
1950	"Our Lady of Fatima"	8	16
1951	"My Heart Cries for You" (with Evelyn Knight)	6	28
1951	"Hot Rod Race"	7	
1951	"Hobo Boogie"	8	
1951	"The Strange Little Girl" (with Ernest Tubb & Anita Kerr Singers)	9	
1951	"(There'll Be) Peace in the Valley (For Me)" (with The Sunshine Boys Quartet)	5	
1951	"Alabama Jubilee" (with The Nashville Dixielanders) Yellen & Cobb	3	28
1952	"Too Old to Cut the Mustard" (with Ernest Tubb)	5	
1952	"Milk Bucket Boogie"	8	
1952	"Salty Dog Rag"	8	
1952	"Midnight"	1	
1953	"Don't Let the Stars Get in Your Eyes"	8	25
1953	"Hot Toddy"	6	
1953	"No Help Wanted No. 2" (with Ernest Tubb)	7	
1953	"Slaves of a Hopeless Love Affair"	8	
1953	"Shake a Hand" (with Anita Kerr Singers)	6	
1953	"Put Christ Back into Christmas"		23
1954	"As Far as I'm Concerned" (with Betty Foley)	8	
1954	"Jilted"	7	
1954	"One by One" (with Kitty Wells)	1	
1954	"I'm a Stranger in My Home" (with Kitty Wells)	12	
1955	"Hearts of Stone" (with Anita Kerr Singers)	4	
1955	"As Long as I Live" (with Kitty Wells)	3	
1955	"Make Believe ('Til We Can Make It Come True)" (with Kitty Wells)	6	
1955	"A Satisfied Mind" (with Betty Foley)	3	
1956	"You and Me" (with Kitty Wells)	3	
1956	"No One but You" (with Kitty Wells)	flip	
1959	"Travelin' Man"	29	
1967	"Happiness Means You" (with Kitty Wells)	43	
1967	"Hello Number One" (with Kitty Wells)	60	
1967	"Living as Strangers" (with Kitty Wells)	63	
1969	"Have I Told You Lately That I Love You?" (with Kitty Wells)	74	
