= Collectable =

Object regarded as having value or interest to a collector

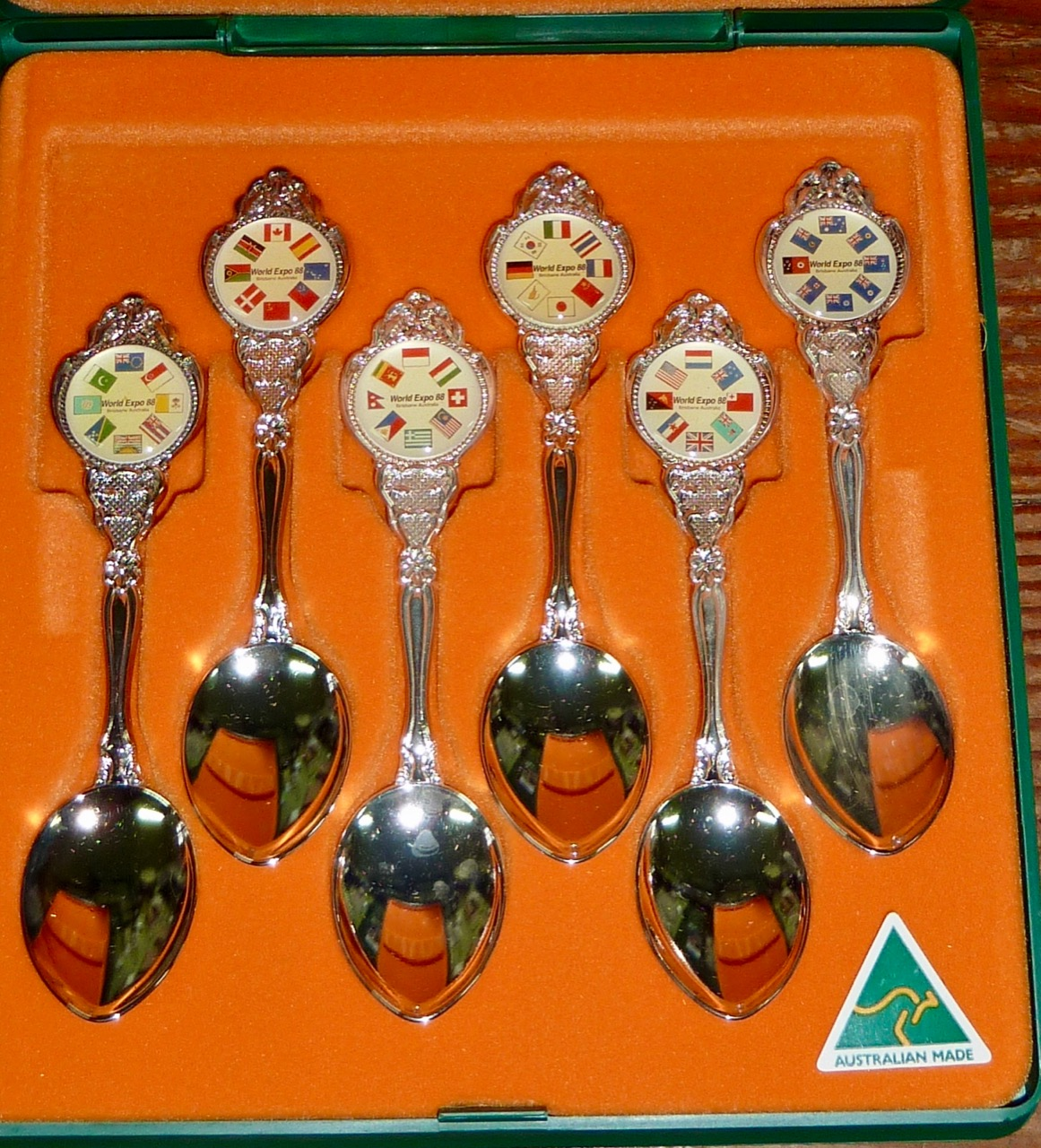
A set of collectable teaspoons from World Expo 88

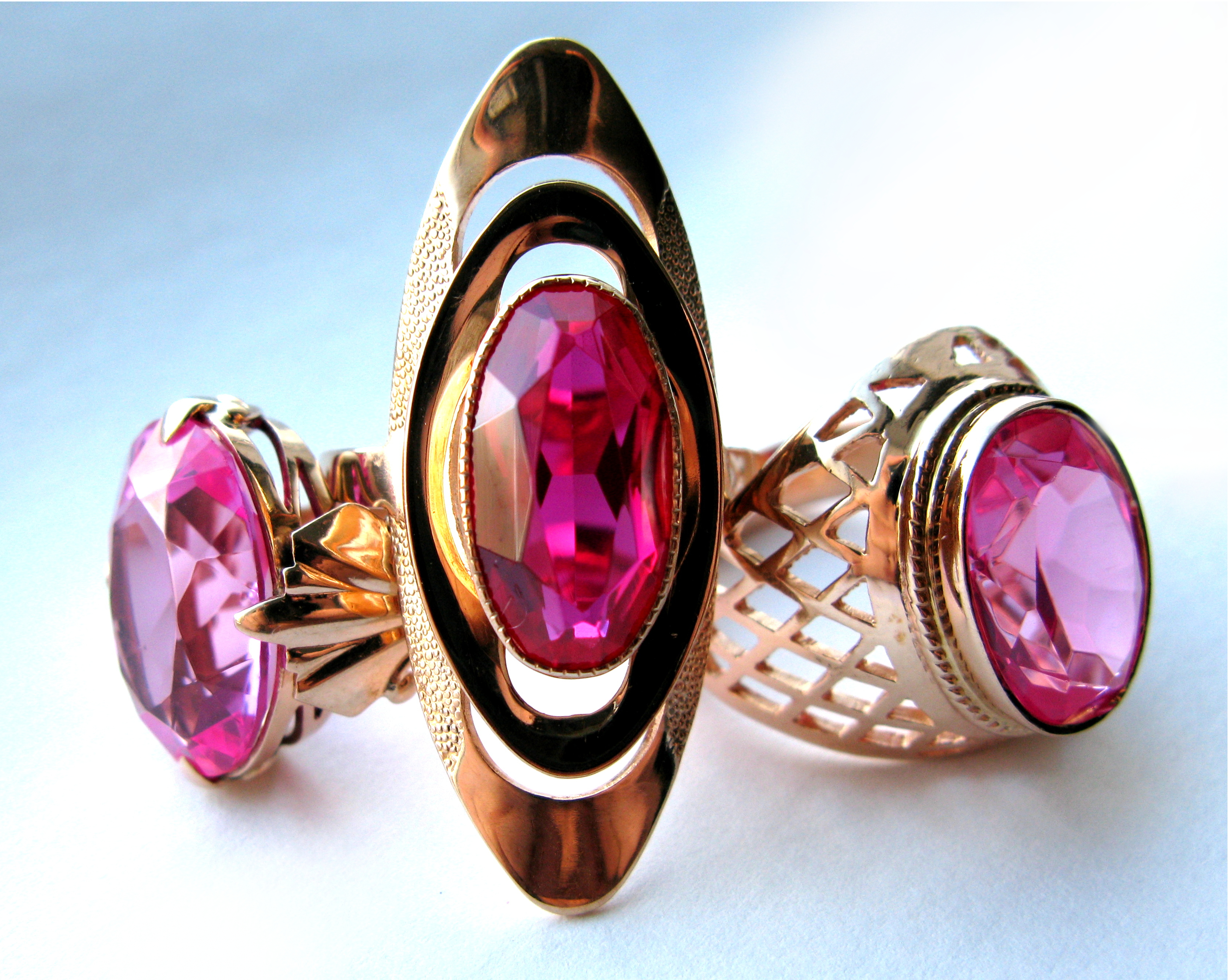
Collectible Soviet gold rings with rubies

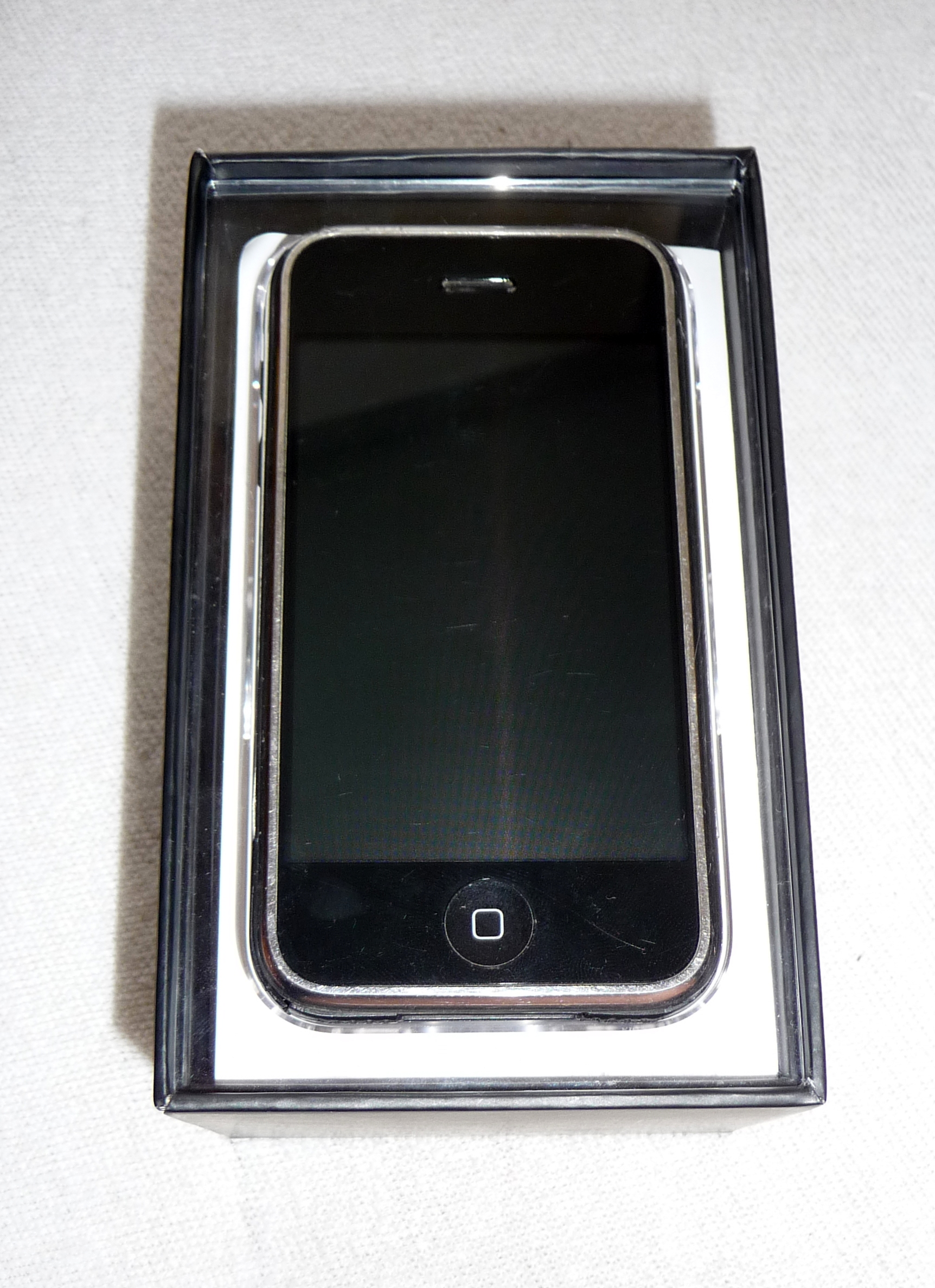
The original iPhone in its box. Unopened "vintage" items which are part of popular brand lines are widely regarded as collector's items.

A collectable, collectible, or collector's item is any object regarded as being of value or interest to a collector. Collectable items are not necessarily monetarily valuable or uncommon. There are numerous types of collectables and terms to denote those types. An antique is a collectable that is old. A curio is something deemed unique, uncommon, or weird, such as a decorative item. A manufactured collectable is an item made specifically for people to collect.

== The business of collectables ==
=== Created to be collected ===
A manufactured collectable (often referred to as a contemporary collectable) is an item made specifically for people to collect. Examples of items commonly sold as collectables include plates, figurines, bells, graphics, steins, dolls, and art. Some companies that produce manufactured collectables are members of The Gift and Collectibles Guild.

Special editions, limited editions and variants on these terms fall under the category of manufactured collectables and are used as a marketing incentive for various types of products. They were originally applied to products related to the arts—such as books, prints or recorded music and films—but are now used for cars, fine wine and many other collectables. A special edition typically includes extra material of some kind. A limited edition is restricted in the number of copies produced, although the number may be arbitrarily high.

=== Collectables in commerce ===
Manufacturers and retailers have used collectables in a number of ways to increase sales. One use is in the form of licensed collectables based on intellectual properties, such as images, characters and logos from literature, music, movies, radio, television, and video games. A large subsection of licensing includes advertising, brand name, and character collectibles. Another use of collectables in retail is in the form of prizes (items of nominal value packaged with or included in the price of a retail product at no additional cost) and premiums (items that can be "purchased" by redeeming coupons, boxtops, or proofs of purchase from the product along with a small fee to cover shipping and handling). Also, collectables have played an important role in tourism, in the form of souvenirs. Another important field of collecting that is also big business is memorabilia, which includes collectables related to a person, organization, event or media, including T-shirts, posters, and numerous other collectables marketed to fans; but also includes ephemera from historical, media, or entertainment events, items that were meant to be thrown away but were saved by fans and accumulated by collectors. Collectibles have become a huge market globally coupled with the rise in application of Non-Fungible Tokens (NFT) which are now used as a medium for digital collectibles sales. The collectables market size in 2020 was $360 billion with an estimated increase of 4% by 2028. Digital collectibles may become a reliable revenue stream for creators as NFTs evolve and spread.

=== Collectables as investments ===
Collectables can be items of limited supply that are sought for a variety of reasons, including a possible increase in value. In a financial sense, collectables can be viewed as a hedge against inflation. Over time, their value can also increase as they become rarer due to loss, damage or destruction. Insurance coverage is a concern, and premiums may cut into any long term profits. One drawback to investing in collectables is the potential lack of liquidity, particularly for very obscure items. There is also a risk for fraud.

=== Digital collecting ===
The collection of digital tokens (NFTs), usually associated with images or artworks, became popular during the NFT craze of 2020–2021. Collectors can buy, trade or exchange NFTs, and these transactions are recorded on a digital ledger called a blockchain. Just like in physical collecting, items can hold value due to different reasons, but they are not necessarily monetarily valuable, rare, or aesthetically pleasing. The Curio Cards, the Rare Pepe or the CryptoPunks are amongst the first cases of digital collectibles. Digital collecting also applies to digital artworks.

== History ==
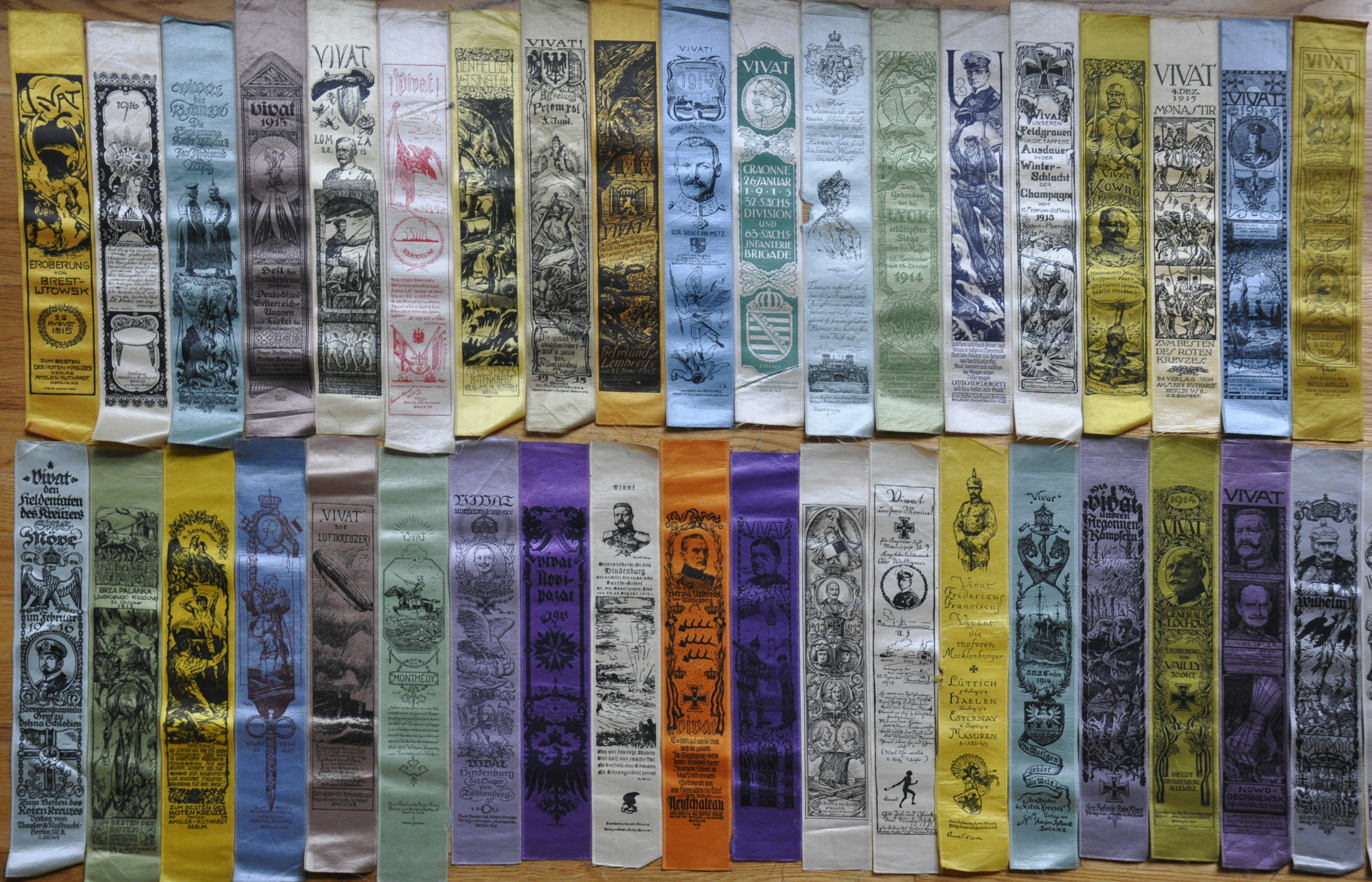
A World War I Vivat ribbon collection. All of them were printed by Amsler & Ruthardt in Berlin for German Red Cross to raise funds for war relief. Ribbons usually measure 15 3/4" x 2 1/2".

The urge to collect unusual and fascinating objects is primeval and not limited to humans. The bowerbird collects brightly colored objects such as shells, leaves, and flowers, which they place in, or around bowers. The pack rat is fond of using shiny objects in their nests.

The Renaissance Cabinet of Curiosities was an antecedent both of modern museums and modern collecting.

Collecting practices also existed in ancient civilizations, where objects such as figurines, coins and artworks were often gathered for religious, decorative, or status purposes.

The earliest manufactured collectables were included as incentives with other products, such as cigarette cards in packs of cigarettes. Popular items developed a secondary market and sometimes became the subject of "collectable crazes". Eventually many collectable items came to be sold separately, instead of being used as marketing tools to increase the appeal of other products.

To encourage collecting, manufacturers often create an entire series of a given collectable, with each item differentiated in some fashion. Examples include sports cards depicting individual players, or different designs of Beanie Babies. Enthusiasts will often try to assemble a complete set of the available variations.

Collector editions are another way of supporting collectables. They typically are produced in limited amount and contain additional content that can be valuable for a collector. This practice is mostly popular in video games.

Early versions of a product, manufactured in smaller quantities before its popularity as a collectable developed, sometimes command exorbitant premiums on the secondary market. Dolls and other toys made during an adult collector's childhood can command such premiums. Unless extremely rare or made as a one-of-a-kind in a mature market, collectables rarely prove to be a spectacular investment.

== See also ==
- Collectible market index
- Commodity fetishism
- Art collecting
- Book collecting
- Coin collecting
- Stamp collecting
- Vintage spirits
- Value (marketing)
