= Karl Records =

American record label

Karl Records was a United States based record label active in the late 1950s and early 1960s.

== History ==
The Karl label was owned by rockabilly and country singer Clay Eager. The label specialized in rockabilly music and country and western music. The label was run out of Springfield, Ohio and London, Ohio. Eager's father-in-law "Pops" Wood was in charge of the engineering at the studio.

== Karl Records artists ==
- Archie Poe
- Art and The Scioto Rhythm Boys
- Bo Ratliff and Country Kinfolk
- Bobby Bennett
- Charlie Neff and Consecrated Banjo
- Clay Eager
- Deacon Morris
- George Hinkle and The Blue Valley Boys
- Jimmy Bobb and Country Gentlemen
- Johnnie Green with The Green Mountain Boys
- Larry Edwards and Dude Ranch Boys
- Little Dickie Chaffin and Cheyenne Cowboys
- Louie Schertzinger
- Lacy Kirk
- Phyllis Ann
- Ramey Brothers
- Ray King and The Kingsmen
- Sunnie Lee
- Tammy Charles
- Tammy Charles & Clita Raffel
- Von Stephens and The String Dusters

== See also ==
- List of record labels
