= Revival Vintage Bottle Shop =

Store in Covington, Kentucky

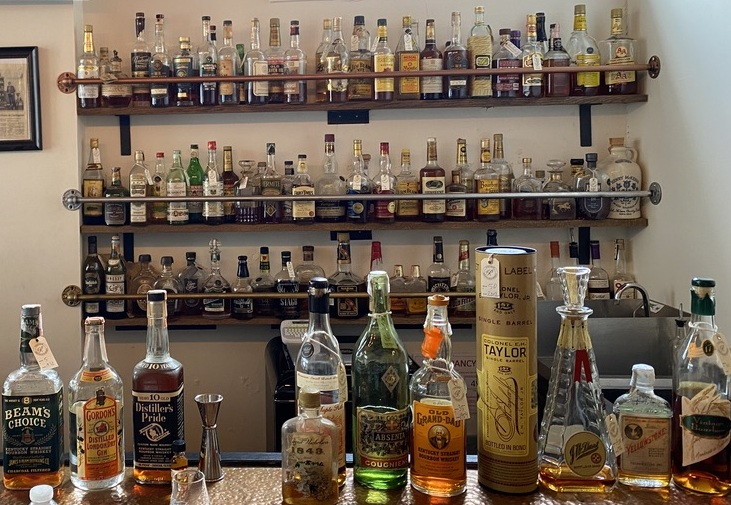
- Liquor available for tasting
- Interactive map of Revival Vintage Bottle Shop

Restaurant information
- Established: 2020
- Food type: Liquor
- Location: 614 Madison Avenue, Covington, Kentucky, 41011, United States
- Coordinates: 39°04′56″N 84°30′34″W
- Website: www.revivalky.com

Revival Vintage Bottle is a resale store and tasting bar in Covington, Kentucky, stocking vintage bottles of liquor and some new liquors. It is a stop on the Kentucky Bourbon Trail.

== Background ==
Vintage spirits, known to collectors as dusties, are illegal for commercial sale in almost all US states. Vintage spirits are legal for sale under Kentucky's 2018 Vintage Spirits law, known as House Bill 100. As of 2022, the law was unique to Kentucky among US states.

Because Kentucky distillers historically included bourbon in employee compensation packages and Kentucky is part of the Bible Belt, an area of the United States where the temperance movement retains some adherents, it is not uncommon for some households to have unopened bottles dating back decades. According to the Kentucky Distillers Association, they receive "regular calls from state residents asking what they can do with unopened bourbon cases they discovered while cleaning out a relative's attic or basement". Unlike wine, liquor stored in unopened bottles remains essentially unchanged from the date of bottling because of its much higher alcohol content and near total lack of yeast following distillation.

== History ==
The shop opened on 8th Street in Covington in 2020. In 2022, the shop opened a second location, also in Covington. In 2024, it relocated the original shop to Madison Avenue in Covington.

== Business model ==
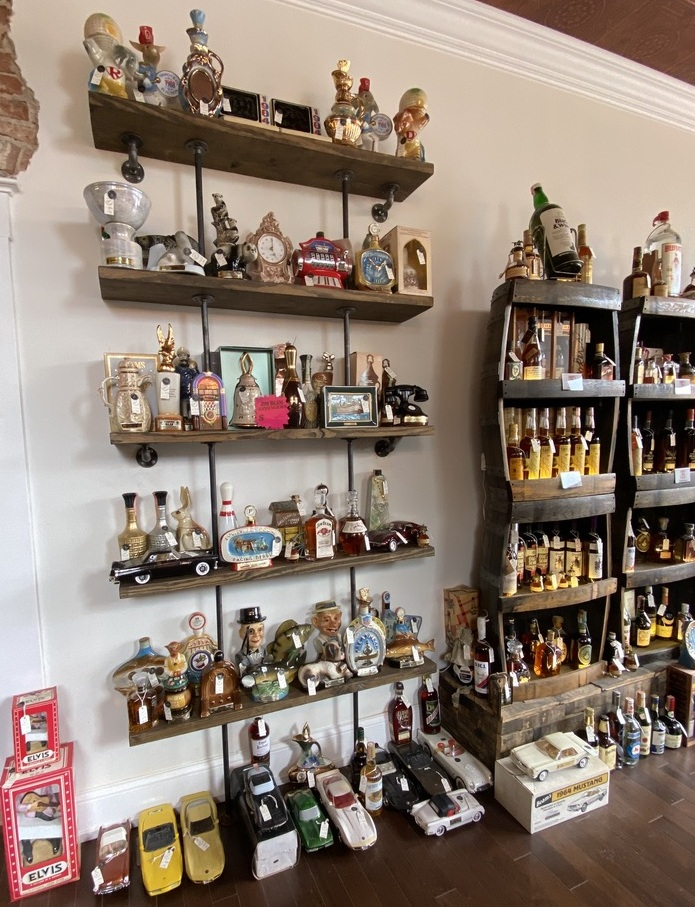
Displays of vintage bottles of liquor

The shop sources bottles of various liquors from estate sales and other private sellers; some vintages date from pre-prohibition. As of 2023, it had over 4,000 bottles. It collects and sells bottles of bourbon, scotch, brandy, tequila, rum, and gin and offers tastings. The shop opens a bottle daily to offer tastings.

Because the liquor remains essentially unchanged, it allows drinkers to experience older versions and compare them to newer versions of the same liquor, the recipes for which and techniques used to produce may have changed over time, or to taste cocktails made from liquors available when the recipe was developed.

== Reception ==
Tasting Table said, "If northern Kentucky is basically the Disney World of bourbon, then Revival Vintage Bottle Shop is its marquee attraction." In 2021 it was named one of the country's best bourbon bars by The Bourbon Review. In 2023 it was added as a stop on the Kentucky Bourbon Trail. In 2024 the Cincinnati Enquirer called it a "bourbon mecca".
