= Curio Cards =

Digital art collectibles on Ethereum

- Platform: Ethereum
- Release: May 2017
- Genre: Collectable

Curio Cards is an early art project on the Ethereum blockchain, which became popular after renewed interests in non-fungible tokens (NFTs) in 2021. The project was created in 2017 to introduce digital art collecting to Ethereum, generate awareness of crypto and support artists through it. The full set of Curio Cards consists of 30 cards, with artwork by seven different artists, as well as the misprint card "17b". After being identified as the first art NFTs on Ethereum, a complete collection of Curio Cards was sold for ETH393 ($1,267,320) at the Christie's Post-War to Present auction in October 2021.

== Background ==
Curio Cards was developed by Travis Uhrig, Thomas Hunt, and Rhett Creighton, and launched on May 9, 2017. At launch, they sold for $0.50–$1 each, which was paid to the artists. Curio Cards feature multiple sets of 30 unique digital images by seven different artists. Curio Cards are colloquially considered to be the first collection of NFT artworks on the Ethereum blockchain. On October 1, 2021, a complete collection of Curio Cards, including the digital misprint "17b", was sold by an anonymous seller for $1.2 million at Christie's Post-War to Present auction held in New York. This was the first Christie's auction where bidding was conducted solely using Ethereum cryptocurrency.

== See also ==
- List of most expensive non-fungible tokens
- CryptoPunks
