= Ichthus Festival =

Christian music festival in Kentucky

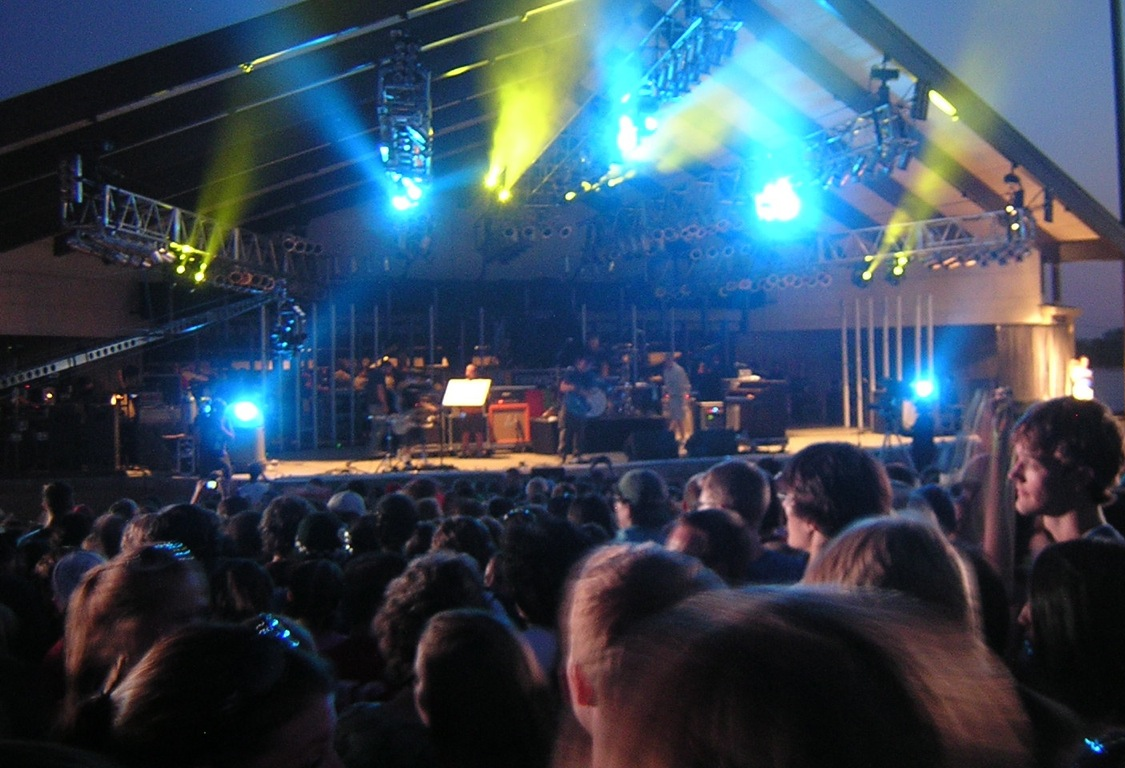
- The main stage at Ichthus 2007
- Locations: Wilmore, Kentucky (1970–2012); Kentucky Horse Park (2015); Wilmore, Kentucky (since 2021)
- Years active: 1970–2015; 2021–present
- Founders: Bob Lyon
- Website: ichthusfestival.com; ichthusfest.org

The Ichthus Festival is a Christian music-focused festival in Wilmore, Kentucky. Held 44 times from 1970 to 2015, the event was originally a Christian-music answer to Woodstock but developed into both the longest-running Christian music festival and a Christian ministry serving tens of thousands of attendees annually. With financial difficulties in the 2010s, the festival left Wilmore after 2012 and put on one last event in 2015 at the Kentucky Horse Park in nearby Lexington, Kentucky. In 2021, the festival was revived in Wilmore.

== History ==
Professor Bob Lyon was inspired by 1969's Woodstock to create a similar experience for fans of Christian music. In spring 1970, Lyon and some of his students at Asbury Theological Seminary hosted thousands at the first Ichthus Festival at Wilmore Campgrounds in Wilmore, Kentucky. Admission for that first event was US$2.50 per day, or $4.00 for the weekend (equivalent to $20.73 and $33.16 in 2025). The name was taken from the ichthys, a "symbol used by the earliest Christians as a secret sign". Student-run for decades, the festival hired a director in 2000, and spent that decade expanding Ichthus Festival into a greater Christian ministry.

After Ichthus 2013 was cancelled due to financial problems, it was announced that the 2014 event (September 26–28) would be held at the Kentucky Horse Park in northern Fayette County, Kentucky, as part of Creation Festivals. The dates were later changed to June 4–7 before the festival was moved to 2015 entirely (July 8–11) due to the 2013–14 North American winter causing an "unusually high number of snow days" that prevented local students from attending. The 2015 Creation-led Ichthus Festival was that group's last, as they announced on February 4, 2016, that there would be no Ichthus 2016: "We underestimated the time and financial resources necessary to restart this great ministry. So, after much prayerful consideration, Creation Festivals has made the difficult decision that stepping away from Ichthus Festival will be in the best interest for the event and its future."

On May 6, 2016, Asbury University announced that it had obtained the rights to the Ichthus Festival name and legacy from Creation Festivals. Fuse Ministries held a relaunch event of the Ichthus Festival on September 18, 2021, at Servant Heart Farm in Wilmore; 600–700 people attended, and the venue operators—Joe and Cheryl Lycan—said it was a success. Fuse's festival has continued there annually through 2022.

== Event ==
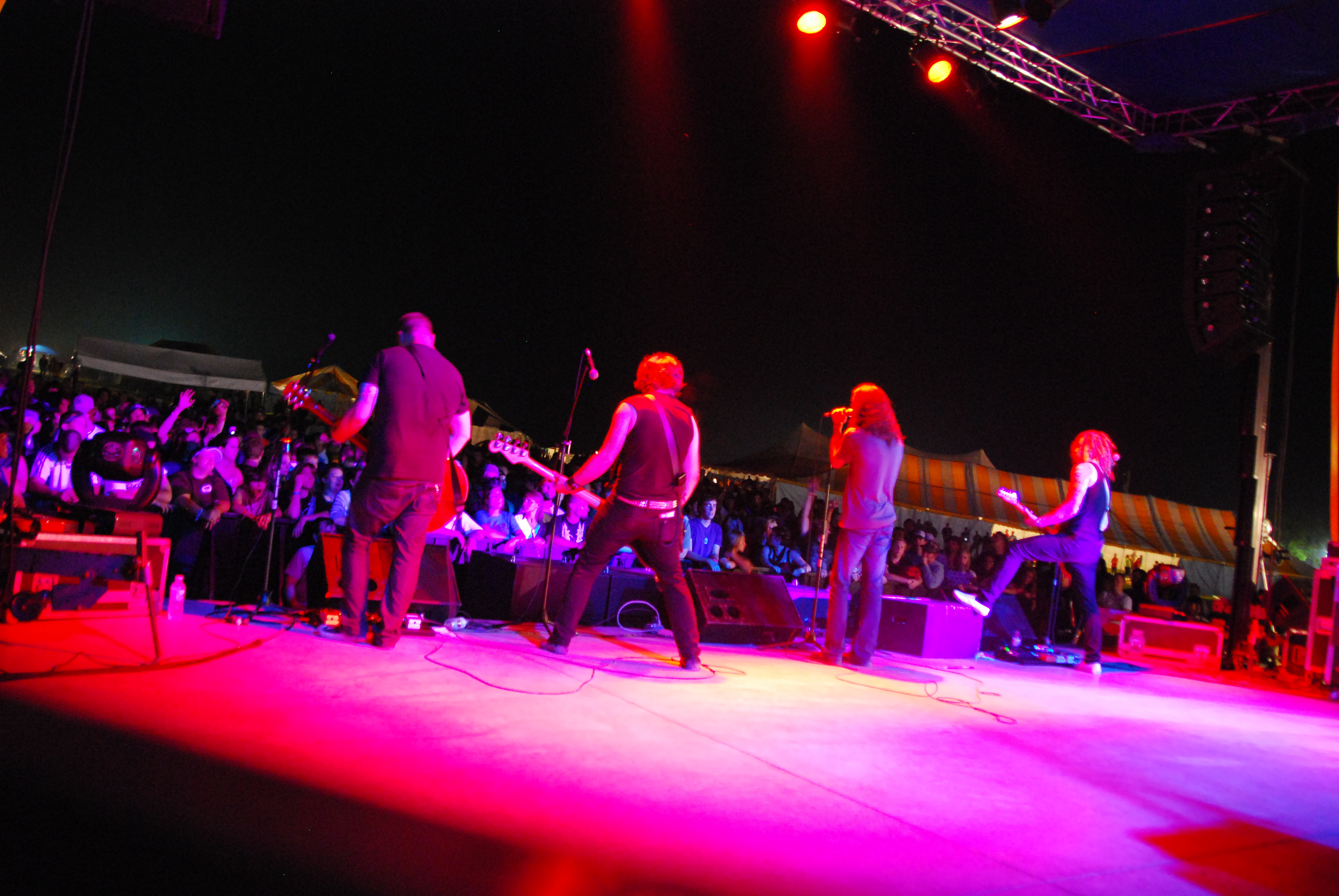
On-stage view of the Deep End Stage at Ichthus 2009

The Wilmore Campgrounds hosted Ichthus Festivals through 1998. Starting in 1999, the festival was held at Ichthus Farm, a 111-acre (45 ha) parcel bought specifically for the festival. Fuse Ministries' September 2021 event was scheduled at "Servant Heart Farm in Wilmore, KY [, ...] the location of the festival from 1999 to 2012." The farm was sold and renamed in 2013. From 2021 through 2024, the festival has been held at Joe and Cheryl Lycan's Servant Heart Farm at 9517 Harrodsburg Road in Wilmore.

For many years, the event was annually scheduled for the last full weekend in April—which in the Bluegrass region meant foul weather: "Ichthus had enough soggy, stormy weekends [...] that it earned nicknames such as Mudthus and Ickythus." In 2005, the festival saw snow, leading then-executive director Jeff James to move the weekend into June, saying, "It's better to be wet and warm than wet and cold." In 2008, an all-inclusive weekend ticket cost $119.00 (equivalent to $177.95 in 2025).

In 1991, the festival saw 11,500 attendees; eight years later that number was 18,000. As of 2009, the five-day, three-stage Ichthus Festival was still attracting 17–20,000 attendees and upwards of 100 musicians and speakers; by 2012, it was the longest-continually-running music festival for Christian music. When relaunched in 2021 by Fuse Ministries, the festival had 600–700 attendees.

== Acts ==
- 7eventh Time Down
- AD
- The Afters
- The Almost
- Altar Boys
- Daniel Amos
- Anberlin
- Apollo LTD
- The Archers
- As I Lay Dying
- Audio Adrenaline
- The Awakening
- BarlowGirl
- Margaret Becker
- Big Tent Revival
- Bleach
- Rick Bonfim
- Building 429
- Burlap to Cashmere
- Jeremy Camp
- Casting Crowns
- Steven Curtis Chapman
- The City Harmonic
- Andraé Crouch
- David Crowder Band
- Day Of Fire
- Demon Hunter
- DC Talk
- DeGarmo and Key
- Deliverance
- Disciple
- Esterlyn
- Family Force 5
- Mark Farner
- Fireflight
- Five Iron Frenzy
- Glenn Kaiser Band
- Natalie Grant
- GRITS
- Guardian
- Charlie Hall
- Haste The Day
- Hawk Nelson
- Hearts of Saints
- Hillsong United
- Israel Houghton & New Breed
- Icon For Hire
- The Imperials
- Jars of Clay
- JJ Weeks Band
- Joy Electric
- Phil Keaggy
- KJ-52
- Kutless
- Lecrae
- Mylon LeFevre
- Living Sacrifice
- Michael Merritt
- Ron and Bill Moore
- Nicole C. Mullen
- MxPx
- Needtobreathe
- New World
- Newsboys
- Norma Jean
- Larry Norman
- O.C. Supertones
- Out of Eden
- Twila Paris
- Charlie Peacock
- Petra
- Pillar
- P.O.D.
- Project 86
- The Rainbeaux
- Red
- Matt Redman
- Relient K
- Resurrection Band
- Sanctus Real
- Selah
- Seventh Day Slumber
- Sidewalk Prophets
- Sixpence None the Richer
- Skillet
- Michael W. Smith
- Rebecca St. James
- Ryan Stevenson
- Superchick
- Michael Sweet
- Switchfoot
- Tenth Avenue North
- The Letter Black
- Third Day
- This Beautiful Republic
- TobyMac
- Thousand Foot Krutch
- Chris Tomlin
- Tree 63
- Twenty One Pilots
- Micah Tyler
- Unspoken
- Sheila Walsh
- Matthew West
- Whitecross
- White Heart
