= Clay Eager =

American singer (1925–1995)

Clay Eager (August 8, 1925 – March 7, 1995) was the stage name of Wilbur Clay Eagy Jr., a rockabilly and country music singer of the 1950s.

== Biography ==
Eager was born in Lima, Ohio. He owned his own record label, Karl Records, in which he released records by rockabilly recording artists such as Ray King, Bo Ratliff, Little Dickie Chaffin, Archie Poe, Von Stephens, Deacon Morris, and Larry Edwards. The label was based out of Springfield, Ohio. Eager appeared on radio stations WFTW out of Fort Wayne, Indiana, and WLOK out of Lima in 1950. In addition he also worked as a DJ and Program Director at WHOK in Lancaster, Ohio. He also appeared on radio shows Renfro Valley Barn Dance and Midwestern Hayride on WLW out of Cincinnati, Ohio, in 1951.

== Discography ==
=== Singles ===
- "Don't Come Crying on My Shoulder" / "Babaloo" (Republic No. 7077) (1954)
- "Railroader's Blues" / "I'm A Lookin' Fer Some Lovin'" (Clay Eager No. 100) (1956)
- "My Guitar And Me" / "Just Like Tonight" (Sage & Sand No. 254) (1957)
- "Mu Mu Mix" / "That's What I Made" (BW Label) (12" Single) (as Clay Eager Family)

=== EP's ===
- Side A: "Forgotten Blues" / "Helen Jo" / Side B: "Skidrow" / "Never Ramble" (Karl EP CE-22) (1956)

=== Albums ===
- Clay Eager Family (Gloryland GSP1133)

=== Various artists compilations ===
- Crazy Wild Rockin' (White Label WLP 8976) (LP)
- Nasty Rockabilly Volume 8 (B-Sharp 666/11) (LP)
- Rocky Hoodlums Go Maximum (Collector #CLCD 4458) (CD)
- More Slow Boogie And Rockin' (Collector/Hepcat) (2005) (CD) (includes "TV Boogie" by Clay Eager)
