= Vintage spirits =

Collectible bottles of liquor

Vintage spirits, also known as dusties, are old, discontinued, or otherwise rare bottles of liquor. The collectibility of a bottle is based on rarity, with age as a secondary factor. The name "dusty" refers to the fact that many such now-collectible bottles had been sitting on a liquor store shelf or unopened in a home or in a restaurant bar for years, collecting dust. In the United States, sales of vintage liquor is generally illegal, the exception being Kentucky, which is a frequent hunting ground for dusties for a variety of reasons. In 2024 Aaron Goldfarb's Dusty Booze: In Search of Vintage Spirits was published, the first book on the subject.

== History ==
In almost all US states such sales are illegal. According to bourbon expert Fred Minnick, laws surrounding the resale of liquor are “usually about restricting or empowering distilleries. Very rarely is there a legislation that you can pinpoint directly to benefiting consumers”.

According to the Ohio Division of Liquor Control, "Secondary sales are a no-win situation. They hurt the small businesses that sell these products legally and put consumers at risk." The Columbus Dispatch adds that the risk is that bottles could have been tampered with, but notes that "Ohio runs all liquor sales inside the state, and these black-market sales bypass the state's system, which generates more than $1 billion in revenue a year."

Vintage spirits are legal for sale under Kentucky's 2018 Vintage Spirits law, known as House Bill 100. For a combination of other reasons, Kentucky has long been a frequent hunting ground for vintage spirits collectors. There are multiple distilleries in the state, and a large number of bourbon distilleries; bourbon in particular is considered highly collectible. Kentucky is also fertile ground for collectors because of the state culture. While distillers historically included bourbon in employee compensation packages, Kentucky is part of the Bible Belt, an area of the United States where many disapprove of drinking alcohol and where the temperance movement retains some adherents. In Kentucky it is not uncommon to find unopened cases dating back decades stored in attics or basements.

== Collecting ==
Collectors look for indications of a bottle's vintage. Bottles without a tax strip -- a piece of paper glued on over the bottle top and down the sides -- predate the 1990s. Bottles without a UPC code predate the 1980s. A government health warning means the bottle can't have been produced before the late 1980s. Measurements in milliliters were adopted after 1979.

Until the 2010s, it was not uncommon for collectors of vintage spirits to find bottles in liquor stores that had gone unsold for decades and buy them at their original sticker price. As of the early 2020s some collectors believe that most of what was worth collecting has been collected, but others believe there is still fertile territory. Some collectors have also built collections by stocking up on notable liquors and waiting for the value to rise.

Collectors value the inconsistency of older vintages. Bourbon, rum, tequila and other spirits can be collectible.

== Professional buyers ==
Professional buyers sell to restaurants and amateur collectors. Top professionals use sources such as chefs, writers, and owners of liquor stores who have knowledge of collections in their local area.

== Notable collectible spirits ==
Willett Single-Barrel 24 Year Old, a Japanese export product, was selling for $650 for a 2-ounce pour at Chicago's Mordecai restaurant in 2018. Buffalo Trace's Ancient Ancient Age 8 Year Old was only made for the Japanese market and so is sought after by collectors in other regions. An Old Fitzgerald Bottled in Bond, barreled in 1965 and bottled in 1971, was estimated by its collector in 2016 to be worth $1,000. A 1974 bottle of Old House Reserve was estimated at $6,500 in 2023. A bottle of Old Rip Van Winkle 25 year old, from a defunct Kentucky distiller, was sold for $55,000.

Products from now-defunct brands or distilleries are especially likely to be collectible. Brands such as Hill & Hill from National Distillers and Old Fitzgerald from Stitzel–Weller are sought after even though while in production, they were considered lower-end brands. Some currently-produced lower-end brands such as Southern Comfort and Drambuie are also collectible in their older vintages.

== See also ==
- Revival Vintage Bottle Shop
