= Blue Lick, Kentucky =

Unincorporated community in Kentucky, United States

- Unincorporated community
- Location in Kentucky Location in the United States
- Coordinates: 37°29′27″N 84°42′27″W
- Country: United States
- State: Kentucky
- County: Lincoln
- Elevation: 1,007 ft (307 m)
- Time zone: UTC-5 (Eastern (EST))
  - Summer (DST): UTC-4 (EDT)
- GNIS feature ID: 507532

Blue Lick is an unincorporated community located in Lincoln County, Kentucky, United States.

== Famous residents ==
The parents of Red Foley kept a general store at the crossroads of Blue Lick. A guitar once used as part-payment for settlement of an account was given to Foley, starting him on a musical path which would eventually see him inducted into the Country Music Hall of Fame.
