= Old Shep =

1935 song by Red Foley and Willis Arthur

Single by Rambling Red Foley with Cumberland Ridge Runners
- B-side: Sing Me An Old Hillbilly Ballad
- Published: June 24, 1935
- Released: March 18, 1936
- Recorded: December 9, 1935
- Studio: American Furniture Mart ARC Studio, 666 N Lake Shore Drive, 21st Floor, Chicago
- Genre: Hillbilly, Western
- Length: 3:23
- Label: Melotone 6-03-53
- Composer: Clyde Julian Foley
- Lyricist: Willis Arthur

Rambling Red Foley with Cumberland Ridge Runners singles chronology
| "I Got The Freight Train Blues" (1934) | "Old Shep" (1936) | "The 1936 Floods" (1936) |

"Old Shep" is a song composed by Red Foley, with lyrics by Willis Arthur, published in 1935, about a dog Foley owned as a child. In reality, the dog, poisoned by a neighbor, was a German Shepherd called "Hoover". Foley first recorded the song on December 9, 1935, for American Record Corporation (ARC) in Chicago, then re-recorded it on March 4, 1941, his first session for Decca Record Company, and again for them on July 31, 1946. He recorded for Decca the rest of his life, 1941 to 1968.

== Other versions ==
The song, later recorded by many artists including Hank Snow and Elvis Presley, became a country classic. Tex Morton 1941, Hank Williams 1942, Elvis Presley 1956, Hank Snow 1959, Ralph DeMarco (1959 - #10 in Canada), Walter Brennan 1960, Dave Dudley 1965, Johnny Cash 1975, Everly Brothers & Garrison Keillor 1988, Pat Boone 1994, Burton Cummings (as Elvis) 1994, Alabama 2006.

A version of the song by Clinton Ford appeared in the UK Singles Chart in October 1959, spending one week at number 27.

Colombian performer Marco recorded a Spanish language version in 1986.

=== Elvis Presley connection ===
On October 3, 1945, Elvis Presley sang "Old Shep" at age ten for his first public performance, a singing contest at the Mississippi-Alabama Fair and Dairy Show. Dressed as a cowboy, he stood on a chair to reach the microphone. He came in fifth place, winning $5 and a free ticket to the fair rides. At sixteen years of age, in 1951, he again performed it for a talent show at L. C. Humes High School, where he was a student, winning an encore for his performance. Presley's cover version was released in 1956.
