= Kentucky Blue Collar Band =

American country rock band

- Also known as: KBCB
- Origin: Morgan County, Kentucky, United States
- Genres: Country rock, Southern rock
- Years active: 2004 – present
- Label: Visionway Records Nashville
- Members: Goble Cantrell; Mark Rohan; Don Hayes; Marc Currens
- Past members: Ronnie Cole; Dean Ball; Mike Ball
- Website: Kentucky Blue Collar Band Website

Kentucky Blue Collar Band are an American country rock band. They were founded in 2004 deep in the foothills of Eastern Kentucky as the Blue Collar Band, composed of Goble Cantrell (rhythm guitar, vocals) and Mark Rohan (drums) along with Don Hayes (lead guitar) and Dean Ball (bass guitar). After discovering that another band already existed in Louisville, Kentucky, with the name "Blue Collar Band", the band added "Kentucky" to its name and thus became the Kentucky Blue Collar Band. The band began performing as the Kentucky Blue Collar Band in 2006, adding Marc Currens as bass guitarist and harmony vocalist in 2008. With the release of their debut album Rockin' the Road in 2006 with independent record label Huba Records, the band garnered a good rotation of local radio play. Their second album Long Hard Road, released in 2009, fared much better and was widely played, including winning song of the month in May 2009 on a Texas radio station, Hoss the Boss, with DJ Don Cudd, as well as coming in fourth for song of the year on that same station's yearly contest for 2009, setting an all-time record at that point for most fan votes of any one song in the history of the contest. The band released their third album Evolution on March 15, 2011, with that album still working its way into and up the charts.

Both the Long Hard Road and Evolution albums were produced by Randy Hayes of J.D. Crowe, Keith Whitley, Lorrie Morgan and Tanya Tucker affiliations at his Digital Basement Studios, with their third "Evolution" album, charting a top 40 country single. After their performances at the CMA Music Festival, Nashville Center Stage and Shooters Nashville, they were signed to a record deal with Visionway Records Nashville. The next album is set to begin recording July 23, 2011, at the Black River Studio in Nashville, Tennessee, under the Visionway Record Label. The first single will be released to radio around September.

The band has been featured in multiple news articles, including the Nashville Music Guide and Music Entertainment Magazine, and has participated in interviews like ones featured by Knight Rider Radio, Hoss the Boss and 1350 The Toad. The band returned to Randy Hayes studio on November 5, 2011, to record the singles- Wagon Wheel, Originally recorded by Old Crow Medicine Show, and Hillbilly Rock, Originally recorded by Marty Stuart. The songs, including mixing and mastering, were completed in a single afternoon. Though not previously planned, the recordings are to become included on an upcoming album of the bands favorite cover songs.

== Band members ==
=== Goble Cantrell ===
Goble Cantrell, lead vocalist and rhythm guitar player was born September 11, 1973, in the little town of Paintsville, Kentucky. He was raised in the even smaller Eastern Kentucky town of West Liberty in Morgan County, Kentucky. Goble's love of music began at a very early age. When he was three or four years old, he would plug a microphone to his mother's old Console 8-Track Stereo and sing along with such artist as George Jones, Conway Twitty and Freddie Fender to name a few, while putting on some major shows at the time right there in his parents' living room.

His earliest show was in second grade when his teacher, Linda Nickell, would allow him and his cousin to go around to other classrooms in the mornings and sing his favorite song, "The Gambler" by Kenny Rogers. Goble knew from that point what he wanted to do in life, that was to be an entertainer.

Goble's grandparents, Rufus and Bessie Cole, got him his first guitar at the age of five, although he didn't learn to play it at that time, his love for music was a constant throughout his early years. He then played various instruments including drums, trumpet, baritone and tuba in middle and high school bands, to cranking up his overpowered stereo in his truck as loud as it would go in order to feel the power of the music.

Goble graduated Morgan County High School in 1992 and one year later at the age of 19 he began to get serious about playing the guitar and writing songs. Goble says, "I can vividly remember when I started learning to play the guitar. I would sit and cry, because I couldn't get it right."

Apparently, Goble did not give up his pursuit of making music or his early dreams of becoming an entertainer. In 2002 he bought a set of drums and set them up in the middle of his living room. He would play them with his feet while at the same time playing his guitar and singing. This is where he began to develop his own style and writing his own songs.

He wrote 20 of the 23 songs on KBCB's albums Album One (year) and Album Two (year), and co-wrote one song with bass player Marc Currens.

In early 2003 his friend Mark Rohan began to come by and play the drums. The two played like this once every week for months. One day they got word about a very popular lead guitar player who piqued their interest. His name was Don Hayes from Olive Hill, Kentucky. Don was invited over several times to jam with the band and one weekend in early 2004, Don finally gave in and came to a practice and has not left since.

By this time Goble was more involved with the music and they needed a bass player. Goble, Mark and Don went through three bass players before landing on Marc Currens in early 2008. Since that time the band has released three studio albums, filmed two professional music videos with producer Kevin Hayes of 371 Digital Films and were signed to a record deal with Visionway Records Nashville in June 2011.

=== Mark Rohan ===
Mark Rohan, drummer and percussionist was born May 23, 1959, in Ludlow, Kentucky. He lived there most of his life until he was 39 years old. He then moved to Lexington, Kentucky, where he currently resides with his wife and best friend Ersula.

Mark grew up listening to Lynyrd Skynyrd, Bob Seger, Alice Cooper and many of the other top groups from the sixties and seventies. He played drums in the high school band throughout his freshman year. He didn't get to play after that because they discovered he couldn't read music and was only playing by ear.

After high school he played with a couple of bands, mostly for fun. Over the years he wandered away from playing.

In the spring of 2003 that all changed when he hooked up with KBCB lead man, Goble Cantrell. Mark knew instantly that there was a real connection between the two of them musically. He immediately got back in the saddle and started beating the drums again, as if he'd never stopped. Mark was most excited by the fact that with KBCB he didn't have to read music, he only had to feel the music and translate that to the drum heads, which he has no problem doing. Mark has been riding that long hard road with the band since its incarnation some eight years ago.

=== Don Hayes ===
Don Hayes, lead guitar player, was born in Fairmont, West Virginia, in January 1950. He was the second of ten children in his family and he was raised in the small community of Whitehall, WV, outside of Fairmont for seven years until he was moved to the outskirts of Akron, Ohio. Living in the village of Canal Fulton for most of his early years, he graduated from Northwest High School in 1968. Don was an avid athlete in his younger days, he could usually be found hard at a game of baseball or basketball. If the chores were done and there wasn't a game in the works, he could usually be found beating on an old hollow body electric guitar a neighbor had given him. That beater served him well until his parents got him a new solid body Silvertone guitar, which became his mainstay for two or three years. Don grew up listening to just about every kind of music, but snuck in as much Rock & Roll as he could. His favorite guitarists and idols in those years were undoubtedly Don Rich and Duane Eddy. Don started playing in his first band around 16 years of age, "Don & Jerry & the Ghost Riders". Don and two other members of the band wrote most of the music for the band, if they weren't playin' a gig, he could usually be found playing with his father's country band. Over the years he played in several cover bands; the two most notable were Dave Cutting and the "Nimissilla Creek Band" and Dave Cutting and the "Coyote Junction Band". He also played in three different bands during his tour of duty in Germany with the US Army. Even though he thought he had retired from playing in bands when he moved to Kentucky in 2002, KBCB kept the pressure on and after several attempts to get him to go to a KBCB practice, he was finally persuaded to attend one. Don was immediately impressed with the fact that KBCB did mostly original material, and with the message left on his answering machine by the band before he even had a chance to return home the evening of that first jam session, a bond of friendship was made that became the history of KBCB. Now every new step is only a new chapter in that history as Don continues to reinvent himself each step of the way.

=== Marc Currens ===
Marc Currens, bass guitarist and harmony vocals, was born on July 5, 1963, in Lexington, Kentucky. Marc spent his early years growing up in Las Vegas, Nevada, and between San Diego and Los Angeles California before returning to Kentucky as a teenager. The musical influences Marc grew up with were vast and largely leaning towards rock, with the exception of early country-western acts. His favorites were the Beatles, the Byrds and the Rolling Stones, as well as Buck Owens and The Buckaroo's. Marc constantly surrounded himself with all things music. He quickly learned to play drums, bass guitar, guitar, and sing lead and harmony vocals by paying close attention to Don Rich and Buck Owens. Over the years he has played in a variety of garage bands and many gigs with friends. He always kept busy playing one way or another, whether with a band or by himself. Notable bands Marc has played with include Spectra (1993–1996), Deuces Wild (1998–1999) as a guest musician (with his brother, Chris Currens as frontman), 11:59 (2000–2002) and Kentucky Blue Collar Band (2008–present). He was brought into the band by close friend, Drummer Mark Rohan. He hit it off instantly with the guys, and appreciated the unique, original sound and concept of the band. Marc didn't have to think twice, as he devoted his time and joined the band very quickly. He has since co-written two songs that were released on KBCB's "Evolution" album the songs, "I Ain't Changin", with Goble Cantrell, and "Do It Later", with Don Hayes, on which Marc also sings lead vocal. Marc has a son, Marc II, born 11/04/87, by a previous marriage. He married the love of his life, Melissa, on February 14, 1999. They currently reside in Lexington, Kentucky.

=== Former members ===
- Ronnie Cole - bass guitar (2004–2005)
- Dean Ball - bass guitar (2005–2007)
- Mike Ball - bass guitar (2007–2008)

== Musical styles ==
The band's sound is influenced by country music, blues, Southern rock and metal and has been described as "rhythm guitar-heavy, foot stomping music." Lead singer Goble Cantrell's' voice has been described as "alternately different and original", with the story telling in their songs of Johnny Cash and the vocal growl of Bob Dylan. The band's combination of styles is most notable in their all original compositions and music on all of their albums. From the hard rockin' songs "The Jam", "Missin' You and "Blue Collar Man", from their Long Hard Road album to the more laid back "When I'm Gone", "Should've Been" and "Country Girl" on their Evolution album the band has a way of blending many different styles to create their own original and unique sound. As the name of the band implies their music is toward the blue-collar working class. Their sound has been described by Geno Delora of England's Rebel Rock Show as, "having a head on collision with the Marshall Tucker Band and wow!" All of their albums contain songs that run the gamut from country, country rock to southern rock. Overall, they describe their music as Kentucky Soul.

== Discography ==
=== Albums ===
- Rockin' the Road (2006) Huba Records, Goble Cantrell, Mark Rohan, Don Hayes and Dean Ball. Recorded and produced by Steve Wright at HUBA Records, West Liberty, Kentucky
- Long Hard Road (2009) Goble Cantrell, Mark Rohan, Don Hayes and Marc Currens. Recorded and produced by Randy Hayes at Digital Basement Studios, Jackson County, Kentucky
- Evolution (2011) Goble Cantrell, Mark Rohan, Don Hayes and Marc Currens. Recorded and produced by Randy Hayes at Digital Basement Studios, Waneta, Kentucky.
