= Roscoe Holcomb =

American singer-songwriter (1912–1981)

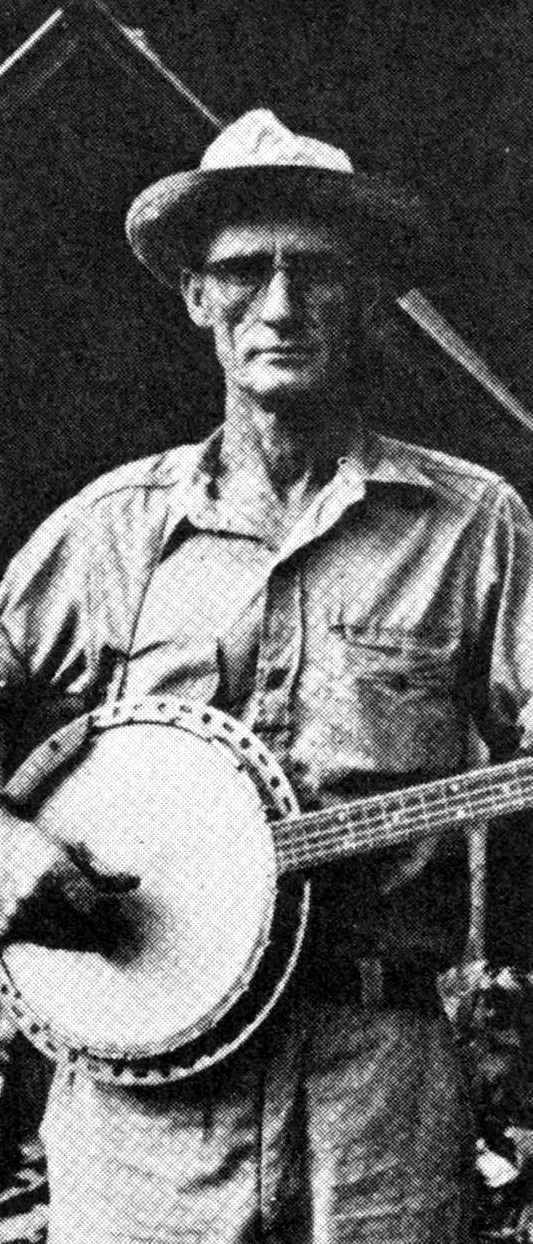
- Roscoe Holcomb in 1962

Background information
- Born: Roscoe Halcomb; September 5, 1912; Daisy, Kentucky, U.S.
- Died: February 1, 1981 (aged 68) Perry County, Kentucky, U.S.
- Genres: Folk; bluegrass; country; gospel; old-time; blues
- Occupations: Miner, construction worker, farmer, musician
- Instruments: vocals, banjo, guitar, harmonica, fiddle
- Years active: 1958–1978

Roscoe Holcomb (born Roscoe Halcomb; September 5, 1912 – February 1, 1981) was an American singer, banjoist, and guitarist from Daisy, Kentucky. A prominent figure in Appalachian folk music, Holcomb was the inspiration for the term "high, lonesome sound", coined by folklorist and friend John Cohen in 1959. It was meant to describe the singing style and vocal timbre of Holcomb. The "high lonesome sound" term is now used to describe bluegrass singing, although Holcomb was not, strictly speaking, a bluegrass performer.

== Performance style ==
Holcomb's repertoire included old-time music, hymns, traditional music and blues ballads. In addition to playing the banjo and guitar, he was a competent harmonica and fiddle player, and sang many of his most memorable songs a cappella. Holcomb stated: "Up till then the blues were only inside me; Blind Lemon was the first to 'let out' the blues."

Holcomb sang in a nasal style informed by the Old Regular Baptist vocal tradition. Bob Dylan, a fan of Holcomb, described his singing as possessing "an untamed sense of control". Dylan was said to be deeply affected by Holcomb's style. He was also admired by the Stanley Brothers and Eric Clapton, who cited Holcomb as his favorite country musician.

== Life and career ==
A coal miner, construction laborer and farmer for much of his life, Holcomb was not recorded until 1959 when he was discovered by folk musicologist John Cohen in Daisy, Kentucky. Cohen spent nearly two decades working with Holcomb but they never quite understood each other. Cohen had actually been the reason for the changing of the spelling of Holcomb's last name from Halcomb on a recording. After which his career as a professional musician was bolstered by the folk revival in the 1960s. He had grown up all around music in Eastern Kentucky, hearing it from family and community but it was never his sole source of income until he was much later in his life. Holcomb gave his last live performance in 1978. Due to what he described as injuries he sustained during his long career as a laborer, Holcomb was eventually unable to work for more than short periods, and his later income came primarily from his music. Suffering from asthma and emphysema as a result of working in coal mines, he died in a nursing home in 1981, at the age of 68.

== Discography ==
Holcomb's discography includes the following albums released on LP during his lifetime:

- The Music of Roscoe Holcomb and Wade Ward, Folkways Records, 1962
- The High Lonesome Sound, Folkways Records, 1965
- Close to Home, Folkways Records, 1975

The following single-artist compilations have been released since his death:

- The High Lonesome Sound, Smithsonian Folkways, 1998
- An Untamed Sense of Control, Smithsonian Folkways, 2003

Holcomb's work appears on many multiple-artist compilations, including the following released during his lifetime:

- Mountain Music of Kentucky, Folkways Records, 1960 (6 of 29 tracks)
- FOTM – Friends of Old Time Music, Folkways Records, 1964 (2 of 16 tracks)
- Zabriskie Point (Original Motion Picture Soundtrack), MGM Records, 1970 (1 of 11 tracks)
- 3rd Annual Brandywine Mountain Music Convention – '76 Music of Kentucky, Heritage Records [Virginia], 1977 (2 of 14 tracks)
