= Salty Dog Rag =

American schottische dance

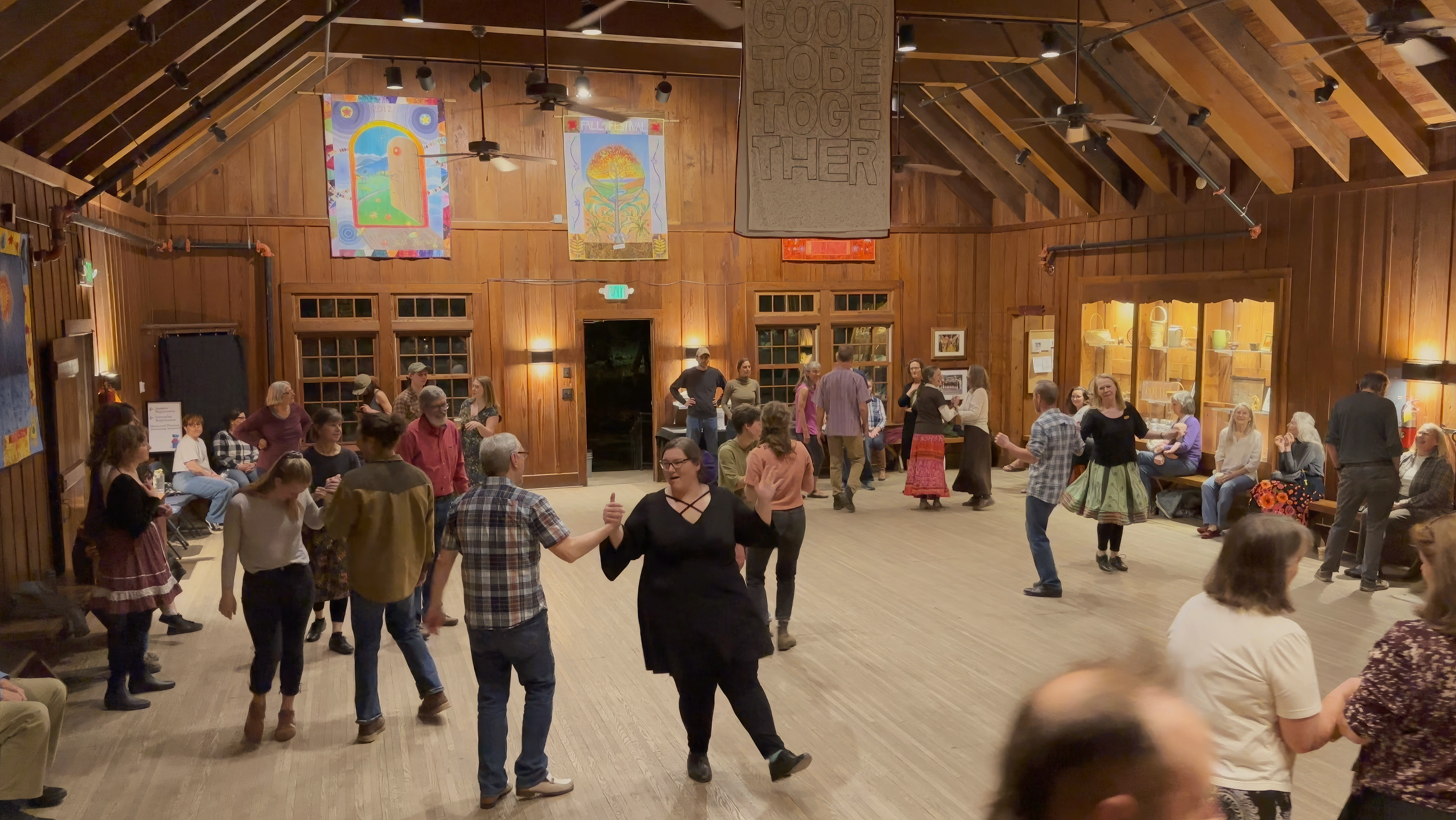
People dance the Salty Dog Rag at the John C. Campbell Folk School.

The Salty Dog Rag is an American schottische dance described by the lyrics of the 1952 hit tune Salty Dog Rag (Note: The original recording can be heard at Red Foley (Song: Salty Dog Rag).) by Red Foley. It is usually a traveling dance, often performed synchronously by multiple couples, who circumnavigate the room in a counter-clockwise direction. It can also be done in-place by a single couple. (Note: An example of the classic group form is Salty Dog Rag at SAFDF 2008. An example of dancing in-place, and with individual variations, and alternative music, is Warren&Terry.) The dance is performed at some folk dance events, (Note: Examples are World Village Music & Dance Camp, CDH, and Gypsy Meltdown.) and it is a traditional ice-breaker at Dartmouth College.

== Origins ==
The song recorded by Foley was composed in 1951 by John Gordy and Edward Crowe. Shortly after the 1952 release, a matching choreography was arranged and attributed to Nita and Manning Smith of College Station, Texas, who subsequently credited Leland and Frankie Lee Lawson as originating the dance.

Overall choreography of the dance Salty Dog Rag, as it is described by the popular recording of the same name, by Red Foley, 1952.

== Choreography ==
The adjacent figure depicts the whole dance sequence, except for the details of the a, b, and c parts, each of which represents only 8 beats of music. So in terms of actual footwork, there are only three 8-count sequences to learn. But these preferences may vary from one locale, time period, and even individual, to another. Detailed descriptions of the original notation and variations are available at several websites.
