= Daisy, Kentucky =

Unincorporated community in Kentucky, United States

- Unincorporated community
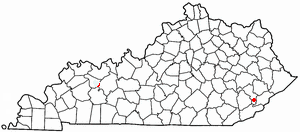
- Location of Daisy within Kentucky
- Coordinates: 37°06′46.64″N 83°05′35.32″W
- Country: United States
- State: Kentucky
- County: Perry

Area
  - Total: 33.9 sq mi (87.7 km^{2})
  - Land: 33.9 sq mi (87.7 km^{2})
  - Water: 0 sq mi (0.0 km^{2})
- Elevation: 965 ft (294 m)

Population (2000)
  - Total: 1,758
  - Density: 32/sq mi (12/km^{2})
- Time zone: UTC-5 (Eastern (EST))
  - Summer (DST): UTC-4 (EDT)
- ZIP code: 41731
- Area code: 606
- GNIS feature ID: 511699

Daisy is an unincorporated community in Perry County, Kentucky. The population was 1758 as of the 2000 United States Census, with a population density of 32 per square mile. The area is known historically for its coal mining.

It was the birthplace and hometown of notable American Appalachian musician Roscoe Holcomb.
