= Renfro Valley Gatherin' =

- Genre: Country music
- Running time: 30 minutes
- Country of origin: United States
- Language: English
- Home station: WHAS (1943-1957); WRVK (1957-present)
- Syndicates: CBS Radio Network (1943-1957)
- Hosted by: Scotty Bussell
- Recording studio: Renfro Valley, Kentucky
- Original release: 1943
- Website: www.renfrovalley.com/gatherin/

Renfro Valley Gatherin' (also formerly known as Renfro Valley Sunday Morning Gathering ) is a United States radio program based in Renfro Valley, Kentucky. The Gatherin' is the third oldest continually broadcast radio program in America, and (since the 2007 cancellation of the WWVA Jamboree) the second-longest continually-running such program featuring country music; only the Grand Ole Opry (1925) and Music & the Spoken Word (1929) have been continually broadcast longer. (The CBS World News Roundup, which debuted in 1938, predates the Gatherin' but has not continually aired.)The Renfro Valley Gatherin' as of 2016 is now exclusively aired on RFDTV'S siriusxm radio channel 147 Rural Radio, Sunday nights at 9:30 pm eastern, and hosted by Scotty Bussell.

== Format ==
The Gatherin' program lasts a half-hour. The program begins with an opening hymn (sung by a choir, which includes audience members during live performances, accompanied by a reed organ), followed by an advertisement for upcoming events at the Renfro Valley Entertainment Center; this is followed by a listing of listeners' birthdays and anniversaries (limited to those 75 years or older or married 50 years or longer). The remainder of the program is themed, with the host reading short stories and monologues between folk, gospel and old-time country music performed by the show's house band. Most songs are vocal; an instrumental will sometimes close out the show. Other than the ad for the entertainment center, there are no commercials, nor is there any space for local stations to insert their own advertisements.

Prior to 2011, the show was produced as a live stage performance. The current incarnation of the program is recorded entirely in a studio up to two months ahead of its air date and features studio recorded music.

== History ==
The Gatherin' program was founded by John Lair, former producer of the National Barn Dance, who founded the Renfro Valley Barn Dance and what would become the Renfro Valley Entertainment Center around it in 1939. The Gatherin' was first broadcast via the CBS Radio Network in September 1943. The Gatherin' was, and is, a thematic program. The original concept of the show was to recreate the atmosphere of the pioneer "getherin's" which were held in Renfro Valley "in the days of long ago." At the start, CBS wanted a Sunday morning companion program to the popular Saturday night Renfro Valley Barn Dance which would not be strictly a religious program, but would fit the Sunday morning format of the time. The "Gatherin'" was John Lair's answer to this. During this time, both shows were headquartered at WHAS in Louisville, Kentucky.

John Lair was the first permanent emcee of the "Gatherin'," and there have so far only been three others; Grant Turner, Jim Gaskin, and Wayne Combs. Gaskin died on Saturday, May 3, 2008, at the age of 70 following a long illness. From then until approximately 2013, the Gatherin' was emceed by Wayne Combs, who is also an entertainer on the Barn Dance and other Renfro Valley shows, and a DJ at WRVK. For 2014 and 2015 episodes, Billy Keith hosted the show. The 2016 host is Scotty Bussell.

After CBS Radio dropped the show at the end of the old-time radio era in 1957, a pre-recorded version of the Gatherin program went into syndication. Meanwhile, a stage version of the show was, until approximately 2011, presented in the Old Barn Theater on Sunday mornings at 8:30. The syndicated broadcast of the Gatherin' is still heard on scores of stations across the United States and Canada, as well as on satellite radio and Internet broadcasts. Following the departure of CBS, and former originating station WHAS of Louisville, from Renfro Valley in 1957, John Lair partnered with Tom Hargis to found WRVK in Renfro Valley, in part to serve as the Gatherin's and the Barn Dance's new flagship station, but mainly to serve the local listening audience in Rockcastle County, Kentucky. The station first went on the air as a 500 watt daytime only AM station in April, 1957, utilizing the former WHAS/CBS studio in what was then the Pioneer Museum Building in Renfro Valley.

== Renfro Valley Entertainment Center ==
Renfro Valley Entertainment Center, the home of the Gatherin' and Barn Dance, has been under separate ownership from WRVK since 1978. At that time the radio station's then-owners, Cochran-Smith Broadcasting of Nashville, chose to move the studios, offices, and transmitter approximately one mile north of the entertainment center, to their present location on Red Foley Road. (Cochran Smith's group of partners had leased the entire entertainment center from Lair in 1966, then exercised their option to buy it in 1968. When they sold the facility back to Lair and his new partners, they kept ownership of WRVK, and moved it out of the Valley.). WRVK is now a 1,200 watt station owned by Saylor Broadcasting, Inc. of Mt. Vernon, Kentucky.

WRVK airs the Gatherin' on Saturdays at 6:25am. The Renfro Valley Entertainment Center currently lists WCYO/Irvine, Kentucky and WLXO/Stamping Ground, Kentucky as official radio stations, but neither station carries the Gatherin'. The show remains in production and in syndication.
