= Renfro Valley Barn Dance =

Renfro Valley Barn Dance was an American country music stage and radio show originally carried by WLW-AM in Cincinnati, Ohio on Saturday nights. It debuted on October 9, 1937, from the Cincinnati Music Hall and moved to the Memorial Auditorium in Dayton, Ohio. It was hosted by John Lair, Red Foley, Cotton Foley, and Whitey Ford.

The show later moved to larger quarters near Mt. Vernon, Kentucky in November 1939 and was carried by WHAS-AM in Louisville, the NBC Radio Network and WCKY-AM in Cincinnati.

The program is no longer broadcast, but a live show bearing its name takes place on Saturday nights at the Renfro Valley Entertainment Center in Renfro Valley, Kentucky. A sister program, the Renfro Valley Gatherin' (established in 1943), continues to air.

PBS produced a documentary series on American Roots Music called "In the Valley Where Time Stands Still", which is a film about the history of the Renfro Valley Barn Dance.

== Performers ==
- Al Ballinger
- The Bullock SistersA
- Kathee "Brown" Staton
- Jerry Byrd
- Martha Carson
- Old Joe Clark
- Little Clifford
- Coon Creek Girls
- John Cosby and the Bluegrass Drifters
- Hugh Cross
- Roy Davidson
- Red Davis
- Dick Dickinson
- Clay Eager
- Bess Farmer and Farmer Sisters
- Joe Fisher
- Russ Fisher
- Betty Foley
- Cotton Foley
- Nick Foley
- Red Foley
- Hilly Foy
- Whitey Ford
- Girls of the Golden West
- Milly and Dolly Good
- Granny Harper
- Aunt Ida Harper
- Charlie Harrison
- Shorty Hobbs
- Fairly Holden
- Jack Holden & the Georgia Boys
- Homer and Jethro
- Betty Lou York
- New Coon Creek Girls
- Dale Ann Bradley
- Susan Tomes Laws
- Debbie Gulley
- Steve Gulley
- Don Gulley
- Courtney Arnold
- Jake Vanover
- Kentucky Briarhoppers
- Harpo Kidwell
- John Lair
- Lily May Ledford
- Ernie Lee
- Little Eller Long
- Emory Martin
- Linda Lou Martin
- Orval Q. Miller
- Slim Miller
- Mulkey Brothers
- Glenn Pennington
- Pine Ridge Boys
- Mary Randolph and the Randolph Sisters
- Chris Robbins
- Jenny Robbins
- Harmonica Bill Russell
- Harold Russell and the Russell Brothers
- Mildred Sams
- Ray Sanders
- Tommy Sosebee
- Ernie Sowder
- Pete Stamper
- Claude Sweet
- Gabe Tucker
- Wayne Turner
- West Virginia Sweethearts
- Donnie White
- Bun Wilson
- Red Brigham And The Harmony Hayriders

== See also ==
- Renfro Valley Gatherin'
