= Collectible market index =

A collectible market index is a tool used by collectors and investors to track values of collectibles against the collectors market from a specific date, calculated in form of Index. It measures the value of a section of the collectors market.

Collectible market indices have been criticised for often being a poor guide to investors. They are sometimes too broad; a sub-category of a collectible may actually be going down in value while the index shows the category going up. This criticism has been levelled against the indices produced by Sotheby's auction house. An index may be based on a fixed "shopping basket" of individual items. This can be an unrealistic indicator of true market trends when collectors' preferences change, or if only the top end of the market is represented. This kind of approach was adopted in the multiple indices produced by Salomon Brothers, and the Market Bradex of The Bradford Exchange. Market indices do not usually include costs. These include auction fees, storage, and insurance. Such costs can be substantial. They can make a significant difference to whether an investment is worthwhile even if the market index shows a rising trend.

A collectible market index can be constructed by combining the indices of a number of individual items. The volatility of the individual prices is assumed to follow a diffusion process with a log-normal distribution. The index is extracted by a least squares analysis. The individual item indices are then combined as a weighted mean index. This approach was first developed for tracking property prices in 1991.

== List of indices ==
- HAGI indices are a group of indices developed by London-based organization Historic Automobile Group. Their research is focused on rare historic motorcars and collectors’ automobiles, calculated since December 2008 based on a proprietary market capitalization formula called survivor weighting.
- Artprice100, a fine art index published by Artprice. It tracks the auction sales of one hundred high-value artists. These artists range from 19th century artists such as Qi Baishi, through Lucio Fontana, to contemporary artists such as Andy Warhol. The index compares secondary art sales to the S&P 500 index of the largest corporations listed on American stock exchanges.
- PCGS coins indices are a group of indices developed by Professional Coin Grading Service (PCGS), a coin grading, authentication, attribution, and encapsulation service.
- Linn’s U.S. Stamp Market Index is the composite index of U.S. stamp market created by Linn's Stamp News newspaper, last index publication dated July 2014.
- Liv-ex 100 Fine Wine is a fine wine index published by London International Vintners Exchange. It is based on 100 fine wines for which there is a strong secondary market.
- The RW101 Rare Whisky Indices is a group of indices designed by Rare Whisky 101 based on their database that has been evolved for more than ten years and contains open market values for the sale of over 147,000 bottles of Single Malt Scotch (no blends, single grain, Bourbon etc. are recorded).
- Market Bradex is a market index for collectible plates published by The Bradford Exchange. It is based on a set of twelve new plate issues.

== Bibliography ==
- Brown, Alan, "Wine: an alternative investment", ch. 11 in, Stephen Satchell (ed), Collectible Investments for the High Net Worth Investor, Academic Press, 2009 ISBN 0080923054.
- Moreau, Dan, "Unvarnished truths about collectibles", pp. 78–82, Kiplinger's Personal Finance, October 1988.
- Newbury, Susanna Phillips, "Epilogue: Asset art", The Speculative City: Art, Real Estate, and the Making of Global Los Angeles, University of Minnesota Press, 2021 ISBN 145296601X.
- Satchell, Stephen; Auld, J.F.W., "Collecting and investing in stamps", ch. 10 in, Stephen Satchell (ed), Collectible Investments for the High Net Worth Investor, Academic Press, 2009 ISBN 0080923054.
- Skoggard, Ross, The Compleat Collector, Lulu, 2011 ISBN 1105245500. This book is an anthology of "The Collector" column originally published in the Toronto Star.
