= Bo Ratliff =

American singer (1933–2024)

James Richard Ratliff (September 19, 1933 – April 10, 2024), better known as Bo Ratliff, was an American rockabilly and country music singer of the 1950s and 1960s.

== Life and career ==
Ratliff was born in Logan County, West Virginia on September 19, 1933. He also recorded under the name Jim Ratliff. His first record was a rockabilly record as "Bo Ratliff and Country Kinfolk" for rockabilly singer Clay Eager's Karl Records out of Springfield, Ohio in 1959. A year later, he released a record on O. Bo. Records which was a Hatfield-Ratliff Production. The song "The Politician" was listed on the record as being written by Bill and Bo (Bill Hatfield and Bo Ratliff).

Ratliff recorded for CLW Records, which was distributed by Arrow Enterprises out of Indianapolis, Indiana. His release for Ma Be Records was out of Beech Grove, Indiana. His recordings on CLW Records, Arrow Records, and Ma Be Records were country releases. Another record was released by Rome Records.

Ratliff wrote "I Don't Care," "Three Little Words I Love You," "Just A Piece Of Paper," "Dim Café," "Do Your Thing," "Who Do You Think You're Fooling," and "Drunk on the Street." He co-wrote "Give Them Guns" with Jim Ward of Louisa, Kentucky, who also wrote "Hey Hey Don't Tease Me." Jim Ward also produced the two CLW Records releases and the Ma Be Records single. Ward had his own publishing company called Jamward Publishing Company with BMI. Ward also wrote the songs "Above All Else" and "I Found It" which appear on Ratliff's 1998 album "Wings Of Love."

In 1968, he released a single "Rum Dum"/"He Walked In" on Sims Records. "Rum Dum" was written by Jerry Schook and "He Walked In" was written by Chuck Howard. Ratliff recorded this with The Jordanaires as his back up vocalists.

In 2006 Ratliff, his three daughters, and two granddaughters released an album called A Little Good News. The band name is Bo and the Ribbons. This gospel group had recently performed at Mt. Olivette Christian Church in Bloomington, Indiana on August 29, 2009. They continue to sing Gospel Music throughout Indiana and have appeared at many different churches. They are scheduled to appear at the Murat Temple during the Christmas time for the Murat Shriner's RV Club and for the Murat Shriner's club in Morristown, Indiana.

Bo Ratliff and Bozo Ratliff (another 1950s rockabilly singer) are two different musicians. Bo Ratliff's first release was for the Karl Label. Bo Ratliff confirmed this himself.

Ratliff died on April 10, 2024, at the age of 90.

== Discography ==
=== Singles ===
- Just A Piece Of Paper/Hey, Hey, Don't Tease Me (Karl No. 3009) (7/1959) (as Bo Ratliff & Country Kinfolk)
- The Politician/Dim Café (O. Bo. CP 4427/4428) (11/1960) (as Bo Ratliff)
- I Don't Care/Three Little Words I Love You (CLW No. 6603) (as Bo Ratliff)
- Give Them Guns/First Bouquet (CLW No. 7011) (as Bo Ratliff)
- Dim Café/Do Your Thing (CLW No. 7016) (as Bo Ratliff)
- Who Do You Think You're Fooling/Drunk on the Street (Ma Be No. 775) (1967) (as Bo Ratliff)
- Rum Dum/He Walked In (Sims No. 324) (1968) (as Jim Ratliff)
- The First Bouquet/Time And Place For Everything (Arrow No. 23230) (1969) (as Jim Ratliff)

=== Albums ===
- Wings Of Love (1998)
- Bo and The Ribbons: A Little Good News (2006)

=== Various artists compilations ===
- More Home Made Early Rock And Roll (White Label LP 8868)
- Here Comes Rock And Roll (Collector/White Label 4522) (2008)
