= Lily May Ledford =

American banjo player (1917–1985)

- Also known as: Lily May Pennington (married name)
- Born: Lily May Ledford; March 17, 1917; Powell County, Kentucky, U.S.
- Died: July 14, 1985 (aged 68) Lexington, Kentucky, U.S.
- Genres: Appalachian folk
- Instruments: Banjo, fiddle
- Years active: c. 1937–1957, 1968–1983
- Labels: Greenhays, June Appal

Lily May Ledford (March 17, 1917 – July 14, 1985) was an American clawhammer banjo and fiddle player. After gaining regional radio fame in the late 1930s as head of the Coon Creek Girls, one of the first all-female string bands to appear on radio, Ledford went on to gain national renown as a solo artist during the American folk music revival of the 1960s. In 1985, she was awarded a National Heritage Fellowship.

== Biography ==
=== Early life and career ===
Ledford was born along the banks of the Red River in rural Powell County, Kentucky in 1917. She was the seventh of fourteen children born to tenant farmer Daw White Ledford and wife Stella May Tackett. Her father taught her to play banjo at a young age, and by age 12 she had learned to play the fiddle. She continued to play banjo and fiddle in a band joined by her sister, Rosie Ledford, and her brother, Cayen Ledford, called the Red River Ramblers. They played up and down the Red River Gorge for various performances, such as square dances. Lily loved the traditional dance tunes, and she often had to sneak off to play at area dances, as her mother considered this type of music to be "old drunkard songs".

In 1936, Ledford won a music competition at Mount Vernon, Kentucky, and the following year made her radio debut on WLS Chicago's National Barn Dance. Shortly after this appearance, she was recruited by John Lair for his new radio program, Renfro Valley Barn Dance, which was initially broadcast from Cincinnati and later moved to Mount Vernon.

Ledford and Lair formed the Coon Creek Girls, with Lair providing the band's name, even though there was no such place as Coon Creek, as it was typical for early country music producers to give bands colorful rural-sounding names. The Coon Creek Girls originally consisted of Ledford on banjo and vocals, Ledford's sister Rosie on guitar, Evelyn Daisy Lange on bass, and Esther Violet Koehler on mandolin. In 1937, they made their debut performance on stage as part of the Renfro Valley Barn Dance and continued for 20 years. Ledford's leadership played a significant role with women playing music. Not only did she help dismantle stereotypes, but also proved that women can play music at a professional level. Lange and Koehler left in 1939, and were replaced by Ledford's sister, Minnie. The group performed at the White House in 1939 for President Franklin D. Roosevelt and his guests, King George VI and Queen Elizabeth. The group made regular appearances on Renfro Valley Barn Dance until disbanding in 1957.

Ledford became the first musical figure to feature in their own comic strip called "Lily May, the Mountain Gal." It ran from October 1936 to August 1937 as a regular feature in the WLS radio magazine, Standby.

=== Folk music revival and later career ===
In the 1960s, musicologist Ralph Rinzler rediscovered Ledford, and invited her to play at the Newport Folk Festival in 1968. Delighted by the positive response she received from the folk music movement, Ledford became a regular at folk festivals across the U.S. and Canada, initially with her sisters, and then as a solo artist when her sisters were unable to join her. In 1971, she appeared at the "Man and His World Festival" in Montreal, and she played at the Smithsonian Folklife Festival in Washington, D.C. the following year. In 1976, Ledford toured the Western U.S. and Canada with Mike Seeger's Old-Time Music Festival. In 1979, while on tour with the Red Clay Ramblers, Ledford recorded an album, Banjo Pickin' Girl, that was released on the Greenhays label in 1983. Around the same period, she appeared at the Mariposa Folk Festival in Orillia.

In the early 1980s, author Loyal Jones interviewed Ledford extensively as part of research conducted with a grant from the National Endowment for the Arts, and broadcast the interviews on National Public Radio. In 1980, Berea College published Coon Creek Girl, an autobiography Ledford had written in the late 1970s. Ledford often discussed her opinion on selling her traditional music, and how it was distasteful to sell a musician's authenticity. Ledford's performance always related back to how she was raised, and often showed in performances. Promoting herself with her music and story grabbed people's curiosity from all over. Ledford stopped performing in 1983, when she was diagnosed with lung cancer. Just before her death in 1985, she was awarded a National Heritage Fellowship, which is the United States government's highest honor in the folk and traditional arts. Ledford inspired a generation of younger folk musicians, including Pete Seeger.

== Repertoire ==
Ledford typically played a five-string banjo in the frailing, or "clawhammer" style taught to her by her father. She also occasionally played the fiddle. Notable recordings include versions of the old world ballad "Pretty Polly" and folk songs such as "Darling Cory", "Jim Along Josey," and "Kitty Clyde". Her fiddle recordings include a rendition of the folk song "Cackling Hen". In the 1970s and early 1980s, Ledford played at a relatively leisurely pace, often stopping to give extensive background information about the songs she was playing.

== Discography ==
=== Coon Creek Girls ===
- The Coon Creek Girls (1968, County Records 712)
- Early Radio Favorites (1982, Old Homestead Records OHCS 142)

=== Solo albums ===
- Banjo Pickin' Girl (1983, Greenhays Recordings GR712)
- Gems: Lily May Ledford (2000, June Appal Recordings JA 0078D)
