= Coon Creek Girls =

American all-female string band

- Origin: Cincinnati, Ohio, United States
- Genres: Appalachian music Bluegrass; Folk; Country
- Years active: 1937–1957
- Past members: Lily May Ledford; Rosie Ledford; Esther Koehler; Evelyn Lange; Minnie Ledford; Norma Mullins

The Coon Creek Girls were one of the first all-female string bands. The band was created in the mid-1930s by John Lair for his Renfro Valley Barn Dance show. The group toured throughout the greater region of Cincinnati, and performed at the White House for President Franklin D. Roosevelt, his wife, Eleanor and the King and Queen of England, King George VI and Queen Elizabeth. The band officially disbanded in 1957. The Coon Creek Girls have been an inspiration to many musicians, and the New Coon Creek Girls carried their name and continued the legacy of “fast-picking,” all female bands.

== History ==
=== Band origins ===
Lily May was recruited by John Lair after winning a fiddle contest. In October 1937, Mr. Lair met Rosie, Lily May's sister, and he decided to hire her and create an all-female band for the Renfro Valley Barn Dance show. The band originally consisted of sisters Lily May and Rosie Ledford (from Powell County, Kentucky) along with Esther "Violet" Koehler (from Indiana), Evelyn "Daisy" Lange (from Ohio) and Norma Madge Mullins (from Renfro Valley, Kentucky). Esther and Evelyn both took on stage names to match the flower theme names of the Ledford sisters.

=== Career at Renfro Valley Barn Dance ===
The first performance as the “Coon Creek Girls” occurred at Cincinnati Music Hall in Cincinnati Ohio, where the Renfro Valley Barn Dance show was to be broadcast and carried by WLW-AM. As well as performing as their own act, the Coon Creek Girls performed as background musicians for Margaret Lillie or better known by her stage name Aunt Idy, another performer on the show. They toured with Aunt Idy and became a booking unit. The group played in movie houses, and toured throughout Ohio, Kentucky and Indiana. As the Coon Creek Girls continue to grow in fame, they received lots of fanmail and gifts. They were “pampered to death,” as fans sent them mail filled with song requests, birthday gifts, and one letter even claimed to name babies after them.

=== First recordings ===
In March 1938, The Coon Creek Girls and Aunt Idy went to Chicago for a recording session with “Vocalion Records.” Mr. Art Datherly produced an album for the Coon Creek Girls. They recorded six songs: "Little Birdie," "Pretty Polly," "You're a Flower that is Blooming," "Sowing on the mountain," as well as "Lonesome Lulu Lee" and "Keep on Fiddlin' on Uncle Doodie."

=== 1939 White House performance ===
On June 8, 1939, the Coon Creek Girls performed in the East Room of the White House for President Franklin D. Roosevelt, his wife Eleanor Roosevelt, and for the King and Queen of England, King George VI and Queen Elizabeth. The Coon Creek Girls were chosen by First Lady, Eleanor Roosevelt, to represent the music of the Ohio Valley. There were numerous musical acts, including Lawrence Tibbett, Marian Anderson, and Kate Smith. Also included was a troupe of Bascom Lunsford's square dancers, whom the Coon Creek Girls played backup music for during their performance. According to the program from the White House, the Coon Creek Girls performed “Cindy”, “The Soldier and the Lady”, "Buffalo Gals", and "How Many Biscuits Can You Eat?". The girls were asked not to wear costumes to the White House, therefore they made their own dresses, matching the color of their dresses with their respective flower names. While they were rehearsing at the White House, they fiddled with a gentleman who called himself “Cactus Jack,” though it turned out to be Vice President John (Jack) Nance Garner. Both the royal family and the Roosevelts were front row for the performance. All were visibly enjoying the music except the King. Lily May wrote that she, “Caught him patting his foot even so little, and I knew we had him.” After the show was over, the Coon Creek Girls and the other performers recorded their White House performance in a studio in Washington D.C. The recording was meant to be a memento for the King and Queen of England to take home with them to commemorate their first visit to the White House.

=== Change in line-up ===
In November 1939, Daisy and Violet left the group. From that point forward, the group consisted of a trio of the Ledford Sisters, Lily May, Rosie, and Susie. This would be the line-up until the original group disbanded in 1957.

== Legacy ==
The Coon Creek Girls inspired many women musicians such as Suzanne Edmundson, Carol Elizabeth Jones, and Cathy Fink. Pete Seeger also claimed that his style of banjo playing was influenced by Lily May herself.

=== The New Coon Creek Girls ===
In 1979, John Lair reinvented the band using the name the New Coon Creek Girls, a combo which remained popular for several decades, despite numerous changes in line-up. Among the former members are Pamela Gadd and Pam Perry, who later became members of the country band Wild Rose.

In 2013, the original touring group of the New Coon Creek Girls from 1985 to 1987 (Vicki Simmons, Pam Perry Combs, Wanda Barnett, and Pam Gadd) made the decision to reunite in order to fund speech therapy music camp for Simmons who underwent surgery for an aneurysm in 2008. As of 2014, Simmons has made an amazing recovery, and the band was still performing various reunion concerts.
