= WRVK =

- Mount Vernon, Kentucky; United States
- Broadcast area: Lexington–Fayette metropolitan area
- Frequency: 1460 kHz
- Branding: Eagle Radio 1460

Programming
- Format: Full service

Ownership
- Owner: Saylor Broadcasting, Inc.

History
- First air date: April 1957
- Call sign meaning: Welcome to Renfro Valley Kentucky

Technical information
- Licensing authority: FCC
- Facility ID: 14732
- Class: D
- Power: 1,200 watts (day); 93 watts (night)
- Transmitter coordinates: 37°23′49″N 84°19′45″W
- Translator: 97.7 W249DT (Mount Vernon)

Links
- Public license information: Public file; LMS
- Webcast: Listen live
- Website: www.wrvk1460.com

WRVK (1460 kHz) is an AM radio station broadcasting a full service format centered on classic country. Licensed to Mount Vernon, Kentucky, United States, it serves the South Central Kentucky area.

== History ==
WRVK was founded in 1957 by John Lair and Tom Hargis in Renfro Valley, Kentucky. The station is currently owned by Saylor Broadcasting, Inc. Today, WRVK features a unique format of traditional country, bluegrass, gospel, and oldies music programming. The station also provides local news, sports, and weather coverage Mondays – Saturdays, a local tradio program entitled "Whatcha Got?" as well as local church programming on Sundays. The station has its own live local music program, "The Suppertime Jubilee", which is broadcast on Tuesday evenings from 6-8 p.m. Eastern Time. Music heard on WRVK ranges from straightforward classic country to classic rock, bluegrass music, gospel music, and even pre-modern era "hillbilly and western music" from the 1920s to the 1940s, rarely heard on American radio.

From the time of the station's debut, WRVK has been the flagship station of the nationally syndicated Renfro Valley Gatherin' (station co-founder John Lair created the show sixteen years prior). Originally airing on Sundays, WRVK moved the show to Saturday morning in 2011, where it airs at 6:25 a.m. local time.

== Internet radio ==
WRVK's radio coverage area is Rockcastle County, Kentucky and immediate surrounding areas. The station began broadcasting 24 hours a day on the radio in July 2008; as of 2016, it no longer does so and has returned to signing off in the evening and overnight hours. WRVK also broadcasts streaming audio online 24/7 to listeners worldwide. This had previously been a rebroadcast of the previous day's radio programs, but is now a live stream of the syndicated and pre-recorded shows which are broadcast on the radio station while it is on low power at night.
