= Red Foley =

American country musician (1910–1968)

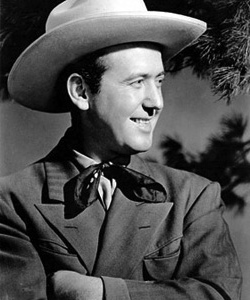

Background information
- Also known as: Mr. Country Music
- Born: Clyde Julian Foley; June 17, 1910
- Origin: Blue Lick, Kentucky, U.S.
- Died: September 19, 1968 (aged 58) Fort Wayne, Indiana, U.S.
- Genres: Country; gospel; rockabilly; boogie; rhythm and blues
- Occupations: Singer; songwriter; musician; radio and TV host; actor
- Instruments: Acoustic guitar; banjo
- Years active: 1930–1968
- Labels: Conqueror; Melotone; Decca
- Formerly of: The Cumberland Valley Boys; The Sunshine Boys; Ernest Tubb; Kitty Wells
- Website: Official website (archived)

Clyde Julian "Red" Foley (June 17, 1910 – September 19, 1968) was an American musician who made a major contribution to the growth of country music after World War II. For more than two decades, Foley was one of the biggest stars of the genre, selling more than 25 million records. His 1951 hit, "Peace in the Valley", was among the first million-selling gospel records. A Grand Ole Opry veteran until his death, Foley also hosted the first popular country music series on network television, Ozark Jubilee, from 1955 to 1960.

He is a member of the Country Music Hall of Fame, which called him "one of the most versatile and moving performers of all time" and "a giant influence during the formative years of contemporary country music."

== Biography ==
Foley was born on a 24-acre (9.7 ha) farm in Blue Lick, Kentucky, and grew up nearby Berea. He gained the nickname Red for his hair color. He was born into a musical family, and by the time he was nine, he was giving impromptu concerts at his father's general store, playing French harp, piano, banjo, trombone, harmonica, and guitar. At 17, he won first prize in a statewide talent show. He graduated from Berea High School and later worked as a $2-a-show usher and singer at a theater in Covington, Kentucky. Foley was of Irish ancestry

=== Early radio and recording career ===
In 1930, as a freshman at Georgetown College, Foley was chosen by a talent scout from Chicago's WLS-AM to sing with producer John Lair's Cumberland Ridge Runners, the house band on National Barn Dance. His first single, "Life is Good Enough for Me / The Lone Cowboy", was released in June 1933 on the Melotone label. In 1937, he returned to Kentucky with Lair to help establish the Renfro Valley Barn Dance stage and radio show near Mt. Vernon in 1939, performing songs ranging from ballads to boogie-woogie to blues. In late 1939, Foley became the first country artist to host a network radio program, NBC's Avalon Time (co-hosted by Red Skelton), and he performed extensively at theaters, clubs, and fairs. He then returned for another seven-year stint with National Barn Dance.

In 1941, the same year he made his first of only two film appearances (portraying himself) with Tex Ritter in the Western, The Pioneers, Foley signed a lifetime contract with Decca Records. He also released "Old Shep" in 1941, a song he wrote with Arthur Willis in 1933 about a dog he owned as a boy (in reality, his German Shepherd, poisoned by a neighbor, was named Hoover). The song, later recorded by many artists, including Hank Snow and Elvis Presley, became a country classic. His patriotic 1944 single, "Smoke on the Water", topped the folk records chart for 13 consecutive weeks, and on January 17, 1945, Foley was the first country performer to record in Nashville, Tennessee. During the session at WSM-AM's Studio B, he recorded "Tennessee Saturday Night", "Blues in My Heart", and "Tennessee Border". He soon became known for such songs as "The Death of Floyd Collins" and "The Sinking of the Titanic". He moved to Nashville in 1946 and was briefly a member of the Brown's Ferry Four, recording "Jesus Hold My Hand" and "I'll Meet You in the Morning".

=== Mr. Country Music ===
In April 1946, Foley signed on to act as master of ceremonies (emcee) and perform on The Prince Albert Show, the segment of the Grand Ole Opry carried on NBC Radio. During the next eight years, he established himself as one of the most respected and versatile performers in country music. He was the emcee and straight man for Opry comedians Rod Brasfield and Minnie Pearl and proved himself a vocalist who could handle all types of songs. His popularity was credited with establishing the Opry as America's top country music radio show. In 1949, Foley was part of the Opry's first European tour, visiting U.S. military bases in England, West Germany, and the Azores, with Brasfield, Roy Acuff, Minnie Pearl, Little Jimmy Dickens, Hank Williams, and others.

Foley began recording with his backing group, the Cumberland Valley Boys, in 1947. He recorded seven top-five hits with the group between 1947 and 1949, including a number-one single, "New Jolie Blonde (New Pretty Blonde)" (a cover of a 1946 Moon Mullican hit), and the country boogie anthem "Tennessee Saturday Night", a chart-topper in 1948. In 1950, he had three million-sellers: "Just a Closer Walk with Thee", "Steal Away" (recorded by Hank Williams as "The Funeral"), and a solo version of the song that became his trademark, "Chattanoogie Shoe Shine Boy". Featuring guitarist Grady Martin, it stayed at number one on Billboard's country chart for 13 weeks and hit the pop chart, as well.

In April 1951, Foley was pleased when the popular Andrews Sisters (Patty, Maxene, and LaVerne) flew from Hollywood to Nashville to join him for a two-day recording session, both acts hoping to repeat the previous successes that the sisters enjoyed when they teamed with Burl Ives in 1947 and Ernest Tubb in 1949, producing both folk and country hits. While the results proved to be less popular, the 10 tunes recorded were vocally well-executed and received a good deal of play on the country radio stations. The songs included the rhythmic "Satins and Lace", the rockabilly-flavored novelty "Where Is Your Wandering Mother Tonight?", a very slow rendering of the forlorn hillbilly classic "Bury Me Beneath the Willow", two duets by Foley and Patty Andrews, and two country gospel favorites: "It Is No Secret (What God Can Do)" and "He Bought My Soul at Calvary".

In 1951, Foley's second wife, Judy Martin, took her own life. To devote more time to his family in Nashville, he cut back on performing, but continued to release hits in a variety of styles, including rockabilly and rhythm and blues. His 1951 hit, "(There'll Be) Peace in the Valley (for Me)" backed by the Sunshine Boys quartet, was one of the first gospel music records to sell one million copies. He also released his first LP that year, Souvenir Album (Decca DL-5303).

Foley's manager was Jim McConnell and "Dub" Albritton was his personal-appearances manager. Starting in 1951, he hosted The Red Foley Show on Saturday afternoons on NBC Radio from Nashville (moving to ABC Radio and Springfield, Missouri, from 1956 to 1961) sponsored by Dow Chemical. On November 21, 1953, he was one of the first eight singers named to Billboard magazine's Honor Roll of Country and Western artists, "named by the disk jockeys of America as an all-time great of country and western music."

Foley never lost his love for country music, and unlike Eddy Arnold, never sought success as a pop artist, though many of his recordings made the pop charts. His other hits included "Sugarfoot Rag", "Cincinnati Dancing Pig", and "Birmingham Bounce", which stayed at number one for 14 weeks. Foley's success with the song prompted 21 cover versions. "One By One", a duet with Kitty Wells, hit number one in 1954 and stayed on the charts for 41 weeks. He also recorded with Ernest Tubb (with whom he maintained a fictitious on-air "feud"), the Dixie Dons, the Anita Kerr Singers, Rosetta Tharpe, Evelyn Knight, and the Lawrence Welk Orchestra. Known by then as Mr. Country Music and America's Favorite Country Gentleman, critics dubbed him the "barnyard Bing Crosby".

=== Television career ===
Foley circa 1956

After several years in virtual retirement, Foley moved to Springfield, Missouri, in July 1954 after music executive Si Siman convinced him to host Ozark Jubilee on ABC-TV and radio. The deal was made over a bottle of Jack Daniel's whiskey at the Andrew Jackson Hotel in Nashville, Tennessee. Foley struggled with alcohol, which according to Maxine Brown, "was a well-kept secret among all the entertainers because we loved him so much."

In 1955, an official act of the Oklahoma Legislature honored him as the artist who has "contributed with humility and reverence more than any other person to perpetuate the music so deeply embedded in the hearts of the American people." That same year, he was credited with discovering 11-year-old Brenda Lee, who became a Jubilee regular. On the October 4, 1956, program, Decca executives presented him with a gold record for "Peace in the Valley". The Jubilee ran for nearly six years and further cemented Foley's fame, but was canceled partly because of federal income tax evasion charges pending against him in 1960. His first trial that fall ended with a hung jury, but on April 23, 1961, he was quickly acquitted.

From 1954 to 1955, Foley recorded a number of transcriptions for RadiOzark Enterprises in Springfield with his band of Tommy Jackson on fiddle, Grady Martin on guitar, steel guitarist Bud Isaacs, guitarist Jimmie Selph, Bob Moore on bass, and Billy Burke on accordion.

On April 25, 1956, he appeared on ABC's Masquerade Party as Little Red Riding Hood, and made a guest appearance the next day on CBS' Strike it Rich. He appeared on ABC's The Pat Boone Chevy Showroom, a 1957–1960 program hosted by his son-in-law Pat Boone. On February 22, 1960, he appeared on Tonight Starring Jack Paar. In the summer of 1961, Foley appeared twice on NBC-TV's Five Star Jubilee and made 58 appearances at 22 state fairs with Boob Brasfield. He moved to Los Angeles, and from 1962 to 1963, played Fess Parker's Uncle Cooter on Mr. Smith Goes to Washington, an ABC-TV sitcom. In 1963, he returned to Nashville and performed and toured with the Grand Ole Opry. He appeared in the 1966 film musical, Sing a Song, for Heaven's Sake, and was a guest on The Joey Bishop Show on August 24, 1967.

Foley was elected to the Country Music Hall of Fame in 1967 (the first Kentuckian and one of only six then-living inductees), which honored him as "one of the most versatile and moving performers of all time" and "a giant influence during the formative years of contemporary country music and today a timeless legend."

=== Death ===
On September 19, 1968, Foley appeared in two Opry performances in Fort Wayne, Indiana, sponsored by the Allen County Sheriff's Department. that included Billy Walker and 19-year-old Hank Williams, Jr., son of his long-time friend Hank Williams. Williams Jr. noted that Foley was somewhat slower than usual that day and had no appetite. Before the second show, according to Walker, Foley came to his dressing room and Walker shared his faith in Christ: Foley said, "Do you think God could ever forgive a sinner like me?" He began to tell me all the rotten things he had done in his life, and I looked him in the face and said, "Red, if God can forgive me, He can forgive you." I prayed with Red. He went out, and the last song he sang was "Peace in the Valley". He came over to side of the stage and said, 'Billy, I've never sung that song and feel the way I do tonight.' Foley suffered respiratory failure that night and died in his sleep, prompting Hank Williams, Jr., to write and record (as Luke the Drifter, Jr.) "I Was with Red Foley (The Night He Passed Away"). According to the song, which charted that November, his last words were, "I'm awful tired now, Hank. I've got to go to bed." Foley had sung "Peace in the Valley" at Hank Sr.'s funeral. Foley was interred in Woodlawn Memorial Park in Nashville.

== Family ==
Foley had an older brother, Clarence "Cotton" Foley (1903–1988), who in 1939, along with brother Red, John Lair, and Whitey Ford, co-founded the Renfro Valley Barn Dance in Rockcastle County, Kentucky.

Foley's first wife was Axie Pauline Cox, who died giving birth to their daughter Betty. Betty (1933–1990) married Bentley Cummins in 1948 and had three children. On August 9, 1933, Foley married his second wife, Eva Alaine Overstake. Known during her solo career as Judy Martin, she was one of the Three Little Maids on National Barn Dance and a sister of country music songwriter Jenny Lou Carson. Red and Eva had three daughters. On November 17, 1951, Eva Foley died by suicide.

On December 17, 1952, Foley announced in Nashville that he had secretly married his third wife, radio and TV entertainer Sally Sweet, on October 28 in Iuka, Mississippi. Earlier that year, he had settled out of court with Sweet's former husband, Nashville music publisher Frank B. Kelton, who had sued him in April for $100,000 for alienation of affection.

Shirley Lee Foley married actor-singer Pat Boone in 1953. Their daughters include Cherry Boone and Debby Boone.

== Legacy ==
Foley was an inspiration to rock 'n' roll, in particular Jerry Lee Lewis and Elvis Presley, who both covered many of his songs. His country boogie material was a clear precursor of the style.

Foley has two stars on the Hollywood Walk of Fame, one for his recording career at 6225 Hollywood Blvd. and one for his television career at 6300 Hollywood Blvd. On June 10, 2003, a Kentucky State historical marker (No. 2114) was placed at Foley's boyhood home in Berea.

In 2002, he was inducted into the Kentucky Music Hall of Fame, where his corncob pipe is on display. In 2006, his 1951 version of "Peace in the Valley" was entered into the Library of Congress' National Recording Registry.

In 1970, Berea College established the Red Foley Memorial Music Award. Initiated by his long-time friend and colleague Si Siman, the annual award is presented to talented Berea College students in recognition of their musical contributions to the campus community. It is intended to promote the music associated with Foley's career, such as folk, country, bluegrass, gospel, and popular music.

A dance to Foley's recording of "Papa" John Gordy's song, The Salty Dog Rag, has been traditional at Dartmouth College since 1972, where it is taught to freshmen during orientation.

The Rooks Van Dellen Residence Hall at Calvin College has an annual celebration of Red Foley Day in mid-November. The celebration began in 1968 when a few students from the hall heard a radio announcer say, "Red Foley was a great country music singer, too bad no one will ever remember him." The day has been celebrated (with a few lapses) to remember Foley ever since.

Foley Middle School, located in Berea near Foley's boyhood home, opened in 1978 and educates students in southern Madison County in the 6th, 7th, and 8th grades. The school retains a large collection of personal items once owned by Foley on display in the library. The collection was donated by members of his family.

Red Foley Court is among several streets in Nixa, Missouri, named for performers on Ozark Jubilee, and Red Foley Road is in Rockcastle County, Kentucky, north of Renfro Valley.

In 2009, singer/songwriter James Power released a song based on Foley's second wife, Eva Overstake (aka Judy Martin), entitled "A Cowgirl's Suicide" on YouTube. The song was featured in the independent film Laid Off by director John Launchi. His grandson Clyde Foley Cummins is in the music industry as well. He plays numerous instruments and has played in several benefits over the years.
