= Bolekhiv Jewish Cemetery =

Jewish cemetery in Ukraine

Coordinates: 49°3′26.6″N 23°51′24.84″E

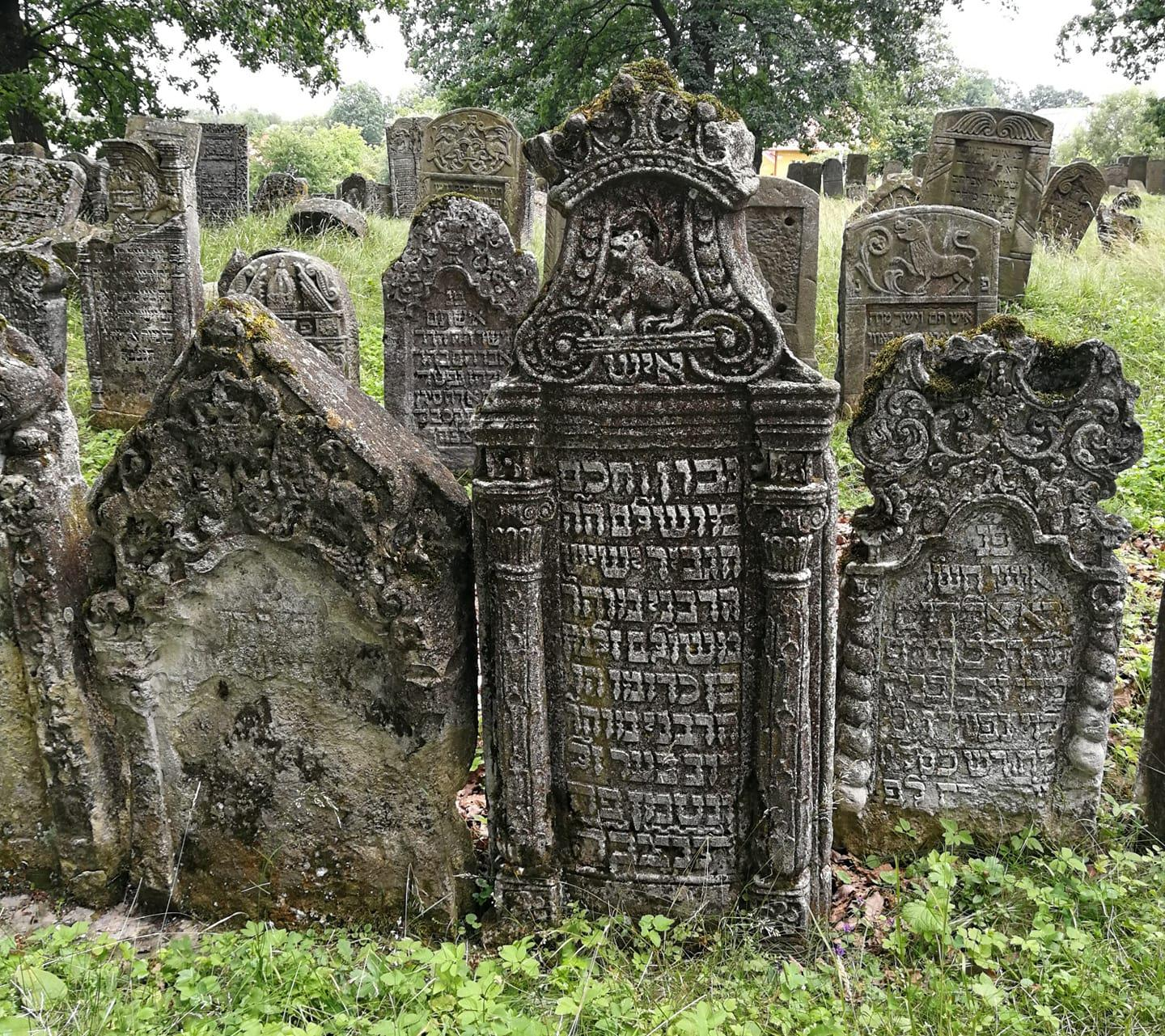
Jewish cemetery in Bolekhiv, 2018

The Bolekhiv Jewish Cemetery is located on a hill near Mandryka St. in Bolekhiv (Ukrainian: Болехів; Polish: Bolechów; Yiddish: באָלעכאָוו), Ivano-Frankivsk Oblast (province) of Ukraine. Many of the tombstones in the cemetery contain epitaphs of animals (birds, lions, and bears), plants, and arabesque carvings. Animals graze on the grass in the cemetery keeping the tombstones relatively visible, although many of the stones are tilted or laying completely face up or down. There are between 2,000 and 3,000 individual graves in the cemetery.

== History ==
In 1612 the Jews of Bolekhiv were given permission to establish a cemetery in the town. According to the group Jewish Galicia and Bukovina, a group which works to record and commemorate Jewish history from Galicia and Bukovina, the earliest known burial in the cemetery occurred in 1615, belonging to a man named David (דוד). According to National Geographic's book Jewish Heritage Travel: a Guide to Eastern Europe, the first burial in the town cemetery actually occurred in 1648., Between 2013 and 2014, individual graves were documented, mapped, and surviving tombstones were photographed and translated by Jewish Galicia and Bukovina. Burials occurred until at least 18 August 1944, with the burial of Sara Schneid.

=== The Holocaust ===
Many victims of the Holocaust are buried in the cemetery. In December 1942, Jews who were working in Bolekhiv were executed (shot) and buried in the cemetery. During the Holocaust in Bolekhiv, a majority of the town's Jewish population was murdered by Nazis and local officials.

== Notable burials ==
- Dov Ber Birkenthal (1723–1805) - Jewish wine merchant and author
- Reisel Landes née Frenkel (1832–1882) - great grandmother to future American producer, David L. Wolper
