= Julian Aberbach =

Austrian-born French-American music publisher

Julian J. Aberbach (8 February 1909 – 17 May 2004) was an Austrian-born music publisher, who lived and worked in both the United States and France. He was responsible, with his younger brother Jean Aberbach, for establishing the Hill and Range music publishing house, and was instrumental in the careers of many leading country and popular music performers of the mid and late twentieth century, including Elvis Presley, Johnny Cash, Ray Charles, Edith Piaf and Jacques Brel.

== Life and career ==
Julius "Julian" Aberbach was born in Vienna, Austria-Hungary, the son of Aron Adolf Aberbach (1878–1959, of Bolechow, then Austria-Hungary) and Anna Aberbach (née Schmetterling, 1883–1964, of Chorostków, then Austria-Hungary). They were Ukrainian Jews. He had a brother, Joachim "Jean" Aberbach (1910–1992). Their father ran a jewelry business.

Julian left school at the age of 17 and went to the Tyrol with his brother, selling upholstery, before returning to Vienna. His brother Jean then began working in Berlin for a music publisher, Will Meisel, before moving to Paris to work for another publisher there. Julian joined him in Paris in 1932, and soon established his own publishing business, which concentrated on securing royalties for movie screenwriters. After the brothers sold the business in 1936, Jean began working in the US as an agent for French music publisher Francis Salabert, while Julian remained in Paris. In 1939 he secured an exit visa to travel to New York City. He was drafted in 1941, and after working with Free French troops in Fort Benning, Georgia, became an instructor at a military intelligence school in Maryland, from where he was discharged in 1944.

By this time he had developed an interest in country music, which he saw as a potentially profitable component of American popular music. After leaving the Army he set up a publishing business, Hill and Range, in Los Angeles with business partners Milton Blink and Gerald King. There, he heard the Western swing bandleader Spade Cooley who was performing at the Venice Pier. He signed Cooley to a songwriting contract, and had immediate success with Cooley's hit song "Shame on You". Soon afterwards, he began working with Bob Wills, setting up a publishing company in Wills' name in which Aberbach had a 50% share. He developed contacts in the music industry in Nashville, and organised the songwriting agreements for such stars as Red Foley, Ernest Tubb, Eddy Arnold, Hank Snow, and, later, Johnny Cash. At one point, about three quarters of all the music produced in Nashville was represented by Hill and Range. When Max Dreyfus of rival publishers Chappell Music sought to buy the company, Aberbach refused, and his brother Jean, who had been working for Dreyfus, joined the company. From then on the two brothers shared the management of Hill and Range, gradually expanding the business, with Julian notionally based in Los Angeles and Jean in New York, although the two frequently swapped roles and met regularly in Chicago to discuss business.

In 1955 Hank Snow suggested that Aberbach check out a new singer, Elvis Presley. Aberbach was impressed by Presley, helped his own friend, Colonel Tom Parker, become his manager, and helped negotiate his move from Sun Records to RCA. He also set up an unprecedented arrangement in which the publishing rights to songs that Presley recorded were split 50:50 between Hill and Range and Presley. Aberbach established his cousin, Freddy Bienstock, as head of Elvis Presley Music, and organised writers to provide songs for Presley's films and albums. In effect, this precluded Presley from recording material not licensed to Hill and Range.

Aberbach also developed his interests in France, contracting Johnny Hallyday to cover songs recorded by Presley. He also worked closely with Edith Piaf, and with Jacques Brel and Mort Shuman, who provided English language versions of many of Brel's songs. By the early 1970s, after Hill and Range had become the biggest independent music publishing business in the world, Aberbach and his family moved their main residence to Paris. Shortly afterwards, while on a business trip to New York, Aberbach suffered a major heart attack and was hospitalised for several months. His brother then sold 75% of the Hill and Range publishing rights to the Warner Chappell company.

He effectively retired from the music business in the early 1970s, but expanded his collection of paintings and sculpture, and later opened the Aberbach Gallery in New York. He received the Abe Olman Award for music publishers at the Songwriters Hall of Fame in 2000, and received the National Order of the Legion of Honour in 2003, in recognition of his unique contribution to French culture.

== Personal life and death ==
Aberbach married Anne Marie in 1953. They had two sons, Dolfi who died aged 23 in 1983 and Ronny who died in an accident the same year, and a daughter, Belinda. His brother Jean Aberbach died in 1992.

Julian Aberbach died of heart failure in New York in 2004 at the age of 95.
