= Chappell & Co. =

English music publisher and piano manufacturer

- Industry: Music
- Founded: 1811; 215 years ago
- Defunct: 1987; 39 years ago
- Fate: Acquired by Warner Communications in 1987, became the "Warner Chappell" brand
- Successor: Warner Chappell Music
- Headquarters: London, England
- Products: Pianos, sheet music
- Parent: List: Dreyfus (1926–70); PolyGram (1970–84); Investor group (1984–87)

Chappell & Co. was an English company that published music and manufactured pianos. Founded by pianist Samuel Chappell, the company was one of the leading music publishers and piano manufacturers in Britain until 1980 when Chappell sold its retail activities to concentrate solely on music publishing.

After some previous acquisitions by other companies, the Chappell brand name is currently owned by Warner Chappell Music, part of Warner Music Group, which acquired it for $200 million in 1987.

== History ==
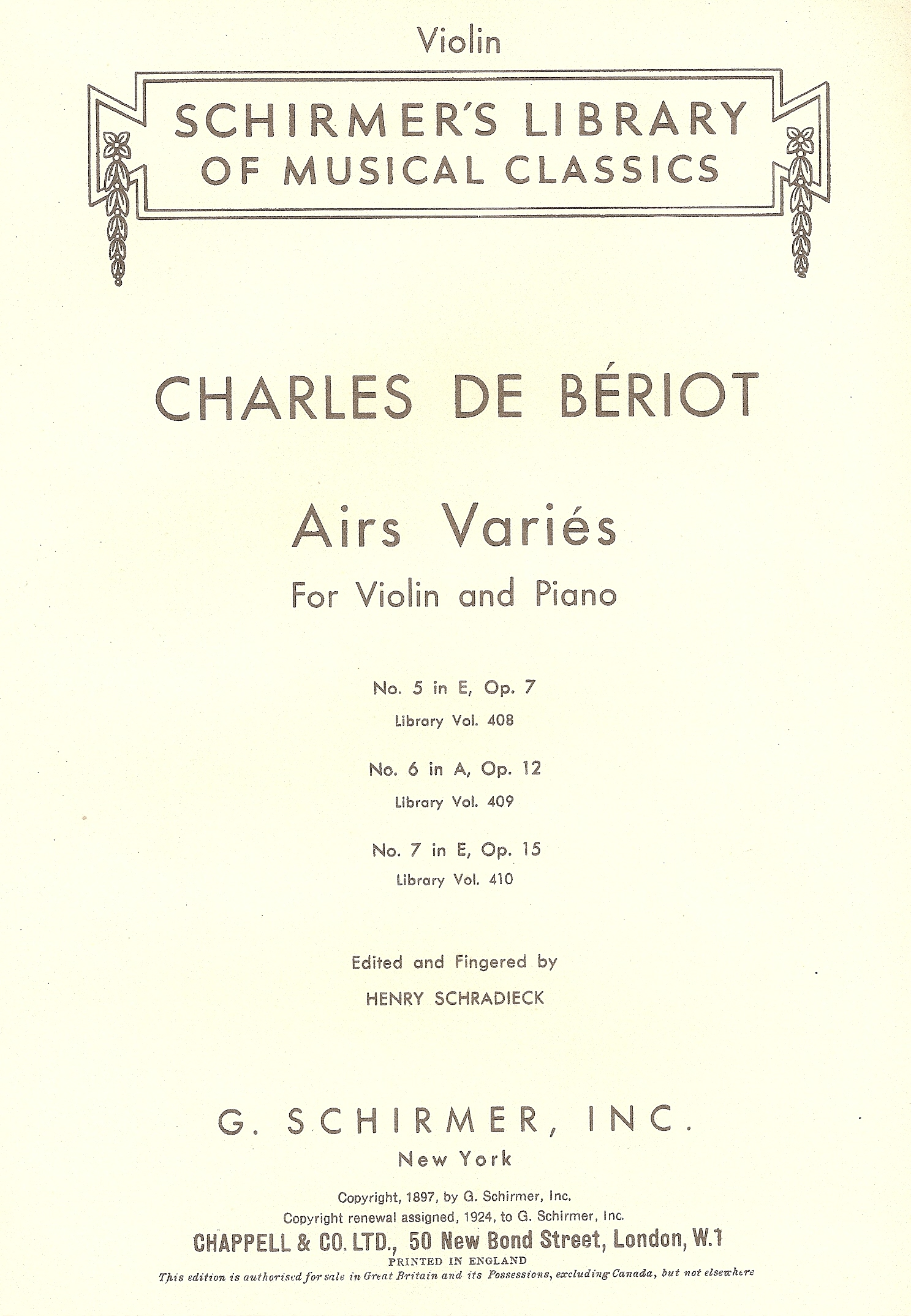
The cover page of an edition of some of Bériot's works distributed by Chappell

Chappell & Co. was founded in 1811 by Samuel Chappell (c. 1782–1834) in partnership with music professors Francis Tatton Latour and Johann Baptist Cramer. Cramer was also a well-known London composer, teacher and pianist. The firm's premises included large showrooms for pianos and other musical instruments (for sale or hire) and sheet music on several floors and became a prominent landmark on Bond Street. Chappell was active in forming the Philharmonic Society. The firm's reputation grew fast, and in 1819, Ludwig van Beethoven wrote to a colleague regarding a piece that he wished to publish, "Potter says that Chappell in Bond Street is now one of the best publishers." Chappell died in 1834, and his oldest son William Chappell (1809–1888) took over, managing the firm on behalf of his widowed mother, Emily Chappell née Patey. Around 1843, William left to join Cramer & Co. and later to found the Percy Society and the Musical Antiquarian Society. His younger brother Thomas Patey Chappell (1819–1902) then took charge. Originally concentrating on music publishing and concert promotion, the firm started manufacturing pianos in the 1840s.

Thomas extended the publishing business of Chappell & Co. and focused the publishing company on musical theatre, a specialty that is still important to the success of Chappell today. The firm promoted concerts, operas and other events that might create a market for music sales. Thomas conceived of and sponsored the Monday and Saturday Popular Concerts at St James Hall (1859), which was partly owned by the family. The concerts were successfully managed by a younger brother, Samuel Arthur Chappell until they came to an end in 1901. One of Tom Chappell's successes was the publication of the Gilbert and Sullivan operas and other music of Arthur Sullivan, as well as, earlier, Gounod's Faust, Balfe's The Bohemian Girl. He was also one of the original directors of the Royal College of Music and one of the original governors of the Royal Albert Hall. Thomas died in 1902. Thomas was of the founding members of the Music Publishers Association and became the Association's first Chairman and held the office between 1881 and 1900. William Boosey wrote:

The name of Tom Chappell stood for that commercial integrity which has given the English people so proud a position in the world of commerce. In all the many departments of business which he controlled, to clearness of judgment and broadness of views he added a splendid liberality: sure factors of success in any walk in life. Added to which he possessed that rarest of qualities, the gift of being successful without making enemies.... I found him ... princely in his generosity; and it was not merely what he gave, but his way of giving, that endeared him so much to the many he benefacted ... he was a man to respect as well as to love.

During the 20th century, Chappell became one of the leading music publishers and piano manufacturers in Britain. The firm was bought by brothers Louis Dreyfus and Max Dreyfus in 1926. On 15 May 1964, three days after the death of Max Dreyfus in the United States, the London building was destroyed by fire but was subsequently rebuilt. However, Louis Dreyfus, who was in London at the time, was devastated by the loss of the company and its archives. By the late 1970s, the firm had become a worldwide music publishing leader famous for publishing musical theatre works, including Rodgers and Hammerstein. In 1970, Chappell sold its publishing division to PolyGram for £20 million. In 1975, the company acquired the American firm Hill & Range.

In 1980, Chappell sold its retail activities to concentrate solely on music publishing. Its premises on London's Bond Street were bought by Kemble Pianos, a large distributor of Yamaha pianos, who operated the music store under the name of Chappell of Bond Street. The Chappell & Co. publishing business was later acquired by PolyGram. In 1975, Chappell acquired the American music publisher Hill & Range. In 1984, PolyGram sold off Chappell to a group of investors (which included Freddy Bienstock). The investors sold the company in 1987 to Warner Communications for $200 million, which merged its music publishing firms to form Warner Chappell Music. It is currently owned by Warner Music Group after Time Warner spun off its music business in 2004.

Production music library of Chappell (Chappell Recording Music Library) went separately to Zomba Group of Companies, which was later acquired by Bertelsmann Music Group and made a part of BMG-Zomba Production Music. It is currently owned by Universal Music Group after Bertelsmann sold its music publishing business in 2007.

== Bibliography ==
- Boosey, William. Fifty years of music, London: Ernest Benn Limited (1931)
- Husk, William Henry; Cranmer, Margaret; Jones, Peter Ward; and Snell, Kenneth R. "Chappell". Grove Music Online (subscription required). ed. L. Macy. Retrieved on 7 March 2007.
