= Yamaha Music London =

- Company type: Subsidiary
- Industry: Musical instruments
- Founded: 2010; 16 years ago
- Headquarters: Soho, London
- Number of locations: England
- Products: Pianos, guitars, drums, brass, woodwinds, bowed
- Owner: Yamaha Corporation
- Website: yamahamusiclondon.com

Yamaha Music London is an English musical instrument and sheet music retail store owned and operated by Yamaha Music Europe GmbH's UK branch. It is located on Soho's Wardour Street, and the majority of the building has Grade II Listed status.

Musical instruments offered include pianos (acoustic and electric), guitars (acoustic, electric, basses), drums & percussion, brass (horns, cornets, trombones, trumpets, tubas), woodwinds (oboes, bassoons, clarinets, flutes, saxophones), bowed (cellos, violas, violins), and accessories.

== History ==
Yamaha Music London was born out of the Chappell of Bond Street music store. Originally established as Chappell & Co. in 1811 on London's Bond Street, Chappell of Bond Street was an acoustic piano maker and publisher of sheet music in the UK. Louis Dreyfus came over from the US to run it in 1929. When the building was burnt to the ground in 1964 Dreyfus opened a new music centre in Bond Street.

=== Chappell of Bond Street ===
Chappell of Bond Street
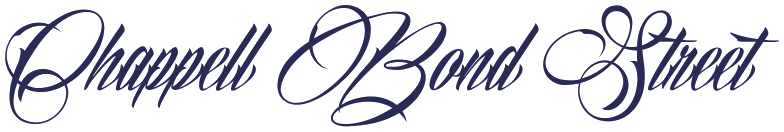
- Industry: Musical instruments
- Founded: 1811; 215 years ago
- Founder: Samuel Chappell
- Fate: Started as a store of Chappell & Co. manufacturing company; sold to Kemble & Co. in 1980, being renamed "Chappell of Bond Street"
- Headquarters: Soho, London
- Number of locations: England
- Products: Pianos, guitars, drums, brass, woodwinds, bowed
- Parent: Kemble & Company (1980–2007)
- Website: chappell-bond-st.com

Chappell of Bond Street (aka Chappell's) was founded in 1811 by Samuel Chappell as a store to commercialise Chappell & Co. pianos, when the company was founded. Although Yamaha (in its various guises) has owned the business since 1980, the store continued to use the Chappell name partly because the two biggest areas of the business –sheet music and acoustic pianos– were so strongly associated with the name. However, in 2015, the company decided to place more emphasis upon the expansive selection of Yamaha musical instruments it carries, hence the decision to use the globally-known name "Yamaha" was made and the Chappell of Bond Street name retired.

=== Kemble Music ===
Kemble & Company, a family business, commenced building pianos in the early 1900s and developed into Britain's largest piano manufacturers, moving to a modern factory in Bletchley, Milton Keynes. In 1966 Kemble & Company became distributors for Yamaha electronic organs. As Yamaha became dominant in other product areas a joint venture company, Yamaha-Kemble Music (UK) Ltd, was set further to develop sales in the UK market of Yamaha pianos, electronic keyboards, guitars and hi-tech equipment.

Around 1980, the UK company Kemble & Company, also a piano builder, bought the Chappell piano business and musical instrument store (which was later transferred to its own company, Kemble Music Ltd). The music publishing arm was bought by Warner Bros to form Warner/Chappell Music (still in existence). Kemble & Company ran a joint venture with Yamaha in Japan (then called the Nippon Gakki company) - trading as Yamaha-Kemble, the business successfully brought Yamaha organs, digital pianos and later guitars, orchestral instruments and professional music equipment into the UK where they acted as exclusive distributor. The Bond Street premises were completely refurbished in 1986 to mark the 175th year of trading.

In 1987, Nippon Gakki renamed itself Yamaha Corporation Japan. The Chappell of Bond Street stores (now including a second store in Yamaha Kemble's home town of Milton Keynes) acted as major retail outlets for the imported Yamaha products, as well as selling Chappell pianos and sheet music (now bought in from external suppliers).

In September 2005, the Milton Keynes branch of Chappell of Bond Street closed with sources citing the end of the original 25-year lease and the spiralling costs of shopping centre rental rates as the cause. In November 2006, the then Chappell of Bond Street store closed the 50 New Bond Street shop for the final time, reopening on 11 November 2006 at 152-160 Wardour Street. The new building is Grade II listed and has three retail floors.

=== Yamaha Music ===
In July 2007 the minority Kemble family shareholding was bought out by Yamaha Corporation, and the company was renamed "Yamaha Music (U.K.) Ltd" in autumn of 2007.

In November 2007, the remaining Chappell of Bond Street store relocated from its Bond Street basement premises to the vacant 160 Wardour Street building, originally built and designed by the Novello Publishing company circa 1905. The Wardour Street premises offered far more space but necessitated substantial upgrading including the installation of a piano lift and a disabled lift.

In 2009, Yamaha Kemble was wholly bought out by Yamaha Corporation Japan and repurposed as Yamaha Music UK Ltd, as an intermediate stage to merging with Yamaha's European operations. At the same time, Kemble Music Ltd (which traded as Chappell of Bond Street) was officially liquidated with all assets and the musical instrument store being sold to Yamaha Music UK Ltd. Shortly afterwards, Yamaha Music UK Ltd merged with the new Yamaha Music Europe company, consolidating some European operations and holding of stock.

In 2010, Yamaha Music (U.K.) Ltd merged with Yamaha Music Europe GmbH; hence Yamaha Music London was established as Yamaha Music's own retail store and, as the only retail store owned and operated by Yamaha outside Japan, it is the European flagship store for Yamaha Music.

Throughout this change, the Chappell of Bond Street store continued to operate. In 2015, it underwent a major refit and was re-launched as Yamaha Music London. Whilst the 'new' store was praised for its spacious and welcoming atmosphere, some long-term customers were saddened to see the shrinkage of the sheet music department (which, in its heyday, occupied the entire basement floor). Likewise, whilst Chappell of Bond Street had to some degree stocked instruments from competing brands such as Korg and Roland, the new store is almost exclusively stocked with Yamaha or Yamaha-associated products.

== Facilities ==
The store comprises four floors, three of which serve as retail areas:

- Ground Floor - selling Yamaha's digital pianos and portable keyboard ranges, as well as sheet music
- 1st Floor Piano Hall - selling Yamaha, Bösendorfer and Kemble acoustic pianos
- 2nd Floor - Offices, not accessible to the public
- Basement - selling Yamaha, Line 6 guitars, drums, synthesisers as well as pro audio and music production products

The Piano Hall has regularly been used as an intimate concert venue and has held concerts by Jamie Cullum, The Kit Downes Trio and other Yamaha-linked artists, often in conjunction with UK charity Centrepoint. Likewise, the basement features a stage for instore gigs and product demonstrations. The store was officially launched on 29 January 2015.

== National Learn To Play Day ==
Since its inception in 2012 by the charity Music For All (the charity arm of the UK's Music Industries Association), National Learn To Play Day has been held annually at many musical instrument stores in the UK. Yamaha Music London has maintained its involvement, offering free starter music lessons throughout the day and has in the past featured drum lessons with comedian Al Murray.

== Bibliography ==
- Husk, William Henry; Cranmer, Margaret; Jones, Peter Ward; and Snell, Kenneth R. "Chappell". Grove Music Online (subscription required). ed. L. Macy. Retrieved on 7 March 2007.
- Letters of Charles Dickens to Wilkie Collins (1891) - Page 136
- The Ladies Museum (1831)- Page 91
