= Leah Horowitz =

Sarah Rebecca Rachel Leah Horowitz (1715–1795), known as Leah Horowitz, was a rabbinic and kabbalistic scholar, who wrote in Yiddish. She was the author of Tkhinne imohes (Supplication of the Matriarchs). She lived in Bolechów, Poland.

== Life ==
Horowitz was the daughter of Jacob Yokl ben Meir Ha-Levi Horowitz (1680–1755) and Reyzel bat Heshl. Her father was a member of the famed kloiz of Brody. Horowitz was one of some seven children. Three of her brothers were rabbis, of whom the most eminent was Isaac (known as "Itsikl Hamburger", 1715–1767), rabbi of Hamburg, Altona, and Wandsbek. There was also a sister, named Pessil. There is some doubt about the identity of another brother and sister. As the sister of eminent brothers, Leah disproves the old canard that the only educated women in her time were the daughters of learned rabbis who had no sons.

Leah's early life was spent in Bolechów, in Polish Galicia (now Bolekhiv, Ukraine), where her father was the rabbi. When he became rabbi of Brody in 1735, his son Mordecai succeeded him as rabbi of Bolechów. Leah remained in Bolechów, continuing to live as a young married woman in the home of her brother. Her husband at this time was Aryeh Leib, son of the rabbi of Dobromyl, Ukraine; later she was married to Shabbetai ben Benjamin ha-Cohen Rappoport, rabbi of Krasny, Russia. It is unknown whether she had any children.

=== Scholarly work ===
Even as a young, Leah was renowned for her exceptional learning. In an era when many women did not learn to read, and those who did rarely learned more than the rudiments of Hebrew, Horowitz studied the Talmud with commentaries and also read some kabbalistic works. The memoirist Dov Ber Birkenthal (Ber of Bolechów) reports that when he was a boy of twelve, Leah helped him prepare for his Talmud lesson with her brother, the rabbi Mordecai. "She would begin to recite the words of Talmud or Rashi by heart, in clear language, explaining it well as it was written there, and I learned from her words. And when the rabbi awoke from his sleep, I knew how to explain the passage in the Talmud to him properly." In the same passage, Ber refers to her as "the learned and famous Mistress Leah, of blessed memory". Other authors also knew of her reputation for learning. The anonymous work Sefer Ozar Sihot Hakhamim describes her as "a great scholar, well-versed in the Talmud" and recounts her Talmudic discussion with another learned lady, Dinah, the wife of Saul Halevi (chief rabbi of The Hague from 1748 to 1785).

Although very few Eastern European Jewish women before the nineteenth century have left writings, Leah was the author of the Tkhinne of the Matriarchs, an eight-page, trilingual prayer for the Sabbath before the New Moon. (As is often the case, the place and date of publication are not mentioned in most of the printed editions.) The work contains a Hebrew introduction, a piyyut (a liturgical poem) in Aramaic, and a Yiddish prose paraphrase of the poem. This text, which has historical importance as one of the few extant works written by an eighteenth-century Eastern European Jewish woman, testifies that its author was far more learned than the norm. (Another work, Tkhinne Moyde Ani, has been erroneously attributed to her.)

Leah Horowitz was passionately concerned with the religious place and role of Jewish women and she was keenly aware of her own anomalous status as a learned woman. She addressed these issues explicitly in the Hebrew introduction to her tkhinne, and by implication in the Aramaic piyyut and the Yiddish paraphrase. Leah was concerned to establish the legitimacy of her own involvement in "Torah study", that is, in Talmudic and halakhic discussion. Furthermore, this is perhaps the only pre-modern text in which an Ashkenazic woman discusses the significance of women's prayer, the proper way for women to pray and the circumstances under which women should and should not submit to their husbands' authority. However, Leah's arguments were largely lost to her contemporaries. After the first few editions, the Hebrew introduction and the Aramaic piyyut were no longer printed, leaving only the Yiddish portion of the text. Presumably, most women could not read Hebrew or Aramaic, while most men were not interested in reading a tkhinne by a woman, even if a portion of it was in the Holy Tongue.

Nonetheless, in her Hebrew introduction Leah argues that women's prayer has the power to bring the messianic redemption if women learn to pray "properly". She states further that because women's prayer can bring the redemption, women should pray in synagogue every day, morning and evening, and she laments the fact that this is not the practice in her day. Leah has a kabbalistic understanding of prayer: true prayer is not for human needs, but for the reunification of the sundered sephirot (divine attributes) of Tiferet and Shekhinah. Because most women have little knowledge of mystical literature and concepts, Leah's purpose in writing this text is to teach women without specialized knowledge how to pray properly, that is, for the sake of the redemption of the Shekhinah from her exile, with weeping. Following kabbalistic sources, Leah attributes great power to tears.

Elaborating on what was already a focus of women's piety, the blessing of the new moon in synagogues, she provides a framework that she believed could bring redemption. In the Yiddish portion of her text (accessible to her female readers), Leah laments the bitterness of the exile and names the New Moon as a time of favor. The protection of each of the four biblical matriarchs is invoked. The central model she presents is the midrashic trope of the children of Israel going into exile, weeping at Rachel's grave. Rachel, a common symbol for the Shekhinah, then entreats the Holy Blessed One (Tiferet), with tears, to redeem the Israelites from their exile. He is so moved by her plea that He agrees to bring the redemption. Leah suggests that women in her day should follow the example of the children of Israel, and of "our faithful Mother Rachel". Together with Leah's images of the other matriarchs, her Yiddish tkhinne, like her introduction, combines an appreciation of women's traditional roles with an assertion that women have far more spiritual power than is usually recognized.
