= Kozakivka =

Coordinates: 48°58′53″N 23°38′55″E

Kozakivka (Ukrainian: Козаківка) is a village in Kalush Raion, Ivano-Frankivsk Oblast (province), Ukraine. It belongs to Bolekhiv urban hromada, one of the hromadas of Ukraine. First written records date back to 1578.

Until 18 July 2020, Kozakivka belonged to Bolekhiv Municipality. The municipality was abolished in July 2020 as part of the administrative reform of Ukraine, which reduced the number of raions of Ivano-Frankivsk Oblast to six. The area of Bolekhiv Municipality was merged into Kalush Raion.
