= Jean Théodore Latour =

- Also known as: Jean T. Latour
- Born: 1766
- Died: 1837 (aged 70–71)
- Occupations: Composer & Pianist

Jean Théodore Latour (1766–1845) was a French pianist and composer.

== Life ==
Latour was born and baptised Corneil François Taton. Initially he lived in Paris, becoming known as a piano virtuoso, and Northern France, working for a while as organist at the church of Sainte-Marguerite in Saint-Omer (Pas-de-Calais); he married on 5 October 1786. He wrote several piano sonatinas that have been adapted for early intermediate piano students. From early in the French Revolution, in 1792, to 1837 he lived in London, where he was known as Francis Tatton Latour. His work appears in several books designed for such students. Latour was appointed official pianist to the Prince Regent, later King George IV of the United Kingdom. From 1810 he was associated with J. B. Cramer and Samuel Chappell in music publishing, becoming an independent music publisher from 1826 to 1830. Le later moved to Paris, where he died in 1845.
