= Rhapsody in Blue (film) =

1945 film by Irving Rapper

- Film poster
- Directed by: Irving Rapper
- Screenplay by: Howard Koch; Elliot Paul; Clifford Odets (uncredited); Harry Chandlee (uncredited); Robert Rossen (uncredited)
- Story by: Sonya Levien
- Produced by: Jesse L. Lasky
- Starring: Robert Alda; Joan Leslie; Alexis Smith; Hazel Scott; Anne Brown
- Cinematography: Merritt B. Gerstad; Ernest Haller; Sol Polito
- Edited by: Folmar Blangsted
- Music by: George Gershwin; Max Steiner; Ray Heindorf
- Distributed by: Warner Bros. Pictures
- Release dates: June 27, 1945 (New York); September 22, 1945 (United States)
- Running time: 151 minutes
- Country: United States
- Language: English
- Budget: $2.46 million
- Box office: $4.9 million

Rhapsody in Blue, subtitled The story of George Gershwin is a 1945 American biographical film about composer and musician George Gershwin, released by Warner Bros. Pictures. Robert Alda stars as Gershwin. Joan Leslie, Alexis Smith, Hazel Scott, and Anne Brown also star, while Irving Rapper directs. The film premiered in New York on June 27, 1945 and was released in the United States on September 22, 1945.

== Plot ==
In Brooklyn, New York, an upright piano is being lifted into the home of the Gershwins, Morris and Rose, and the two sons, Ira Gershwin, and his little brother, George Gershwin. Morris tells Ira that she set him up for piano lessons, but Ira shows distaste for it. As they talk, they hear George play a tune on the piano. Morris and Rose change their mind and quickly sign George up for lessons. As George grows, and his talents beginning to set in, he starts to become more interested in the music of Tin Pan Alley. He passes through multiple teachers, and finally stays at Prof. Franck.

George shows the Prof. his musical talents with Jazz, and Franck says that if this is what he wants to do, he should pursue it. George begins to write many songs, but none of them really take off. He gets a job as a pianist for a show held by Harpo Marx. He is mocked by the actor on stage, and George storms out of the theater, with Ira by his side. George then gets a job as a song plugger, playing songs for people to see if they would like the piece of music. Through this, George meets Julie Adams, who's a singer on Broadway. George notices how good a singer she is, and suggests that she sing a song he wrote, "Swanee". She eventually likes it, and George gives her his copy of it, and the rest of the copies he plays, even some he did not write. George calls his boss and quits.

George goes to pitch his song to Max Dreyfus. While waiting, George meets Oscar Levant, who will eventually become his closest friend. George shows his song to Max, and Max sees potential in the song, and the writer. Max, still with Gershwin in his office, calls the singer Al Jolson, and asks him if he will sing the tune in a show, and Al, after hearing Gershwin playing it on the other end, says he will. Al sings the song to a thunderous applause, which inspires Gershwin to write his own musical. He casts Julie as his leading lady, as she is the only one for the role. The show flops, but Gershwin continues, and eventually his shows begin to skyrocket, all with Julie in the lead. While this, Julie begins to fall in love with George, while he seems oblivious to it.

While Gershwin is backstage dressing up for a dinner party, he is approached by the bandleader Paul Whiteman. Whiteman tells Gershwin of a show he's putting on, aiming to fuse Jazz and serious European Classical Music. At the dinner party, Franck and Dreyfus argue about this idea, with Max saying it will not work and he should continue to write hits and Franck telling him to do what he feels right. Gershwin agrees, and writes Rhapsody in Blue. Gershwin plays the piano for the piece at the premiere, which was attended by Igor Stravinsky and Sergei Rachmaninoff. He performs to a wonderful applause, and his career is now in action.

After the performance, he goes to visit Franck, but learns he is ill, and was unable to attend the performance as he is dying. Shortly after, a man approaches Gershwin to write a concerto for the New York Philharmonic, to premiere at the prestigious Carnegie Hall; Gershwin is hesitant, as he feels that he does not have enough experience with classical music. Gershwin continues to write musicals, and finds that Ira is aspiring to be a lyricist. Ira writes the lyrics for his next musical, "Lady be Good", which becomes a smash hit.

Gershwin travels to Paris to find inspiration for his concerto, where, in a small night club, he hears his song "Fascinating Rhythm" being played to welcome him to the country. While in Paris, Gershwin meets Christine Gilbert. They begin to go on many outings together, and they eventually both fall in love with each other. Gershwin takes Christine back to America, where he hosts a party. He also invites Julie, who meets Christine, and is greatly distressed. It is here where George and Ira coin each other "Mr. Words" and "Mr. Music". George eventually plays his song "The Man I Love" on the piano, with Julie's accompaniment, but while singing, Julie becomes overwhelmed with Christine and George, begins to cry, and leaves without saying anything to George.

Not very soon after, Gershwin becomes infatuated with painting, and begins to paint regularly. Christine walks in on George painting, where she admits her love to him. George tells her they will have a penthouse in New York, built for two. Julie disregards this, saying that he "sounds like his songs". She tells him to get back to his painting, which he does, and she leaves heartbroken.

== Cast ==
- Robert Alda as George Gershwin
- Joan Leslie as Julie Adams
- Alexis Smith as Christine Gilbert
- Charles Coburn as Max Dreyfus
- Julie Bishop as Lee Gershwin
- Albert Bassermann as Prof. Franck
- Morris Carnovsky as Poppa Morris Gershwin
- Rosemary DeCamp as Momma Rose Gershwin
- Oscar Levant as Himself
- Paul Whiteman as Himself
- Al Jolson as Himself
- George White as Himself
- Hazel Scott as Herself
- Anne Brown as Herself as Bess in 'Porgy and Bess' scene
- Herbert Rudley as Ira Gershwin
- Darryl Hickman as Ira Gershwin as a boy
- Elsa Maxwell as Herself
- Oscar Loraine as Maurice Ravel
- Tom Patricola as Himself
- Will Wright as Sergei Rachmaninoff
- George Zoritch as Joe in ‘Blue Monday’ Number (uncredited)

== Production background ==
Starring Robert Alda as Gershwin, the film features a few of Gershwin's acquaintances (including Paul Whiteman, Al Jolson, and Oscar Levant) playing themselves. Alexis Smith and Joan Leslie play fictional women in Gershwin's life, Morris Carnovsky and Rosemary De Camp play Gershwin's parents, and Herbert Rudley portrays his brother, Ira Gershwin. Levant also recorded most of the piano playing in the movie, and also dubbed Alda's piano playing. Both Rhapsody in Blue and An American in Paris are performed nearly completely, with the "Rhapsody in Blue" debut of 1924 orchestrated by Ferde Grofe and conducted, as it was originally, by Whiteman himself.

The film introduces two fictional romances into the story, one with a woman named Julie Adams, played by Leslie, and the other a near-romance with a rich society woman played by Smith.

The film notably features performances of Gershwin music by two African-American musicians/singers, Anne Brown and Hazel Scott. Both were child prodigies whose training included study at the Juilliard School. Brown, a soprano, created the role of "Bess" in the original production of Gershwin's opera Porgy and Bess in 1935. In the film, she sings the aria Summertime from Porgy and Bess, albeit rearranged, with the first verse sung by chorus only. Scott, who became known as a jazz and classical pianist and singer, was one of the first African-American women to have a career in Hollywood as well as television. She plays herself in the film, performing in a Paris nightclub.

== Production ==
Irving Rapper felt it was "a rambling story, a little too sentimental at times, although written by some wonderful people, mainly Clifford Odets with far, far too much music."

Rapper wanted Tyrone Power to play the lead but had to use Robert Alda. The director says apart from Alda's casting he was happy with the film.

== Reception ==
Contemporary reviews praised the music but had more mixed opinions about the plot. Bosley Crowther of The New York Times called the film a "standard biography," explaining: "There is never any true clarification of what makes the gentleman run, no interior grasp of his nature, no dramatic continuity to his life. The whole thing unfolds in fleeting episodes, with characters viewing the genius with anxiety or awe, and the progression is not helped by many obvious and telescoping cuts. Throughout, the brilliant music of Mr. Gershwin is spotted abundantly, and that is the best—in fact, the only—intrinsically right thing in the film." Variety reported that the film "can't miss" with "such an embarrassment of musical riches," to the point that "corny lapses" in the script "can easily be glossed over." Harrison's Reports wrote that the musical score was "in itself worth the price of admission," while the film also offered "an inspiring, heart-warming story." Wolcott Gibbs of The New Yorker called the music "magnificent", but criticized the plot as a "monumental collection of nonsense," describing the romance as "silly and tiresome."

On the review aggregator website Rotten Tomatoes, 20% of five critics' reviews are positive, with an average rating of 4.8/10. Metacritic, which uses a weighted average, assigned the film a score of 55 out of 100, based on five critics, indicating "mixed or average" reviews.

=== Box office ===
According to Warner Bros. records, the film earned $3.3 million domestically and $1.5 million overseas.

== Awards and nominations ==
The film was nominated for the Grand Prize at the 1946 Cannes Film Festival. The film was also nominated for two Academy Awards; Academy Award for Best Original Score (Ray Heindorf and Max Steiner) and Best Sound Recording (Nathan Levinson).
