= Max Dreyfus =

German-American publisher, arranger, songwriter (1874–1964)

- Born: April 1, 1874; Kuppenheim, Grand Duchy of Baden, German Empire
- Died: May 12, 1964 (aged 90); Brewster, New York, United States
- Occupations: Music publisher, arranger, songwriter
- Spouse: Victoria Brill

Max Dreyfus (April 1, 1874 – May 12, 1964) was a German-born American music publisher, arranger and songwriter. Between the 1910s and 1950s he encouraged and published the work of many of the writers of the so-called Great American Songbook, and was president of Chappell & Co., Inc. American office, the world's largest music publishing firm.

== Biography ==
He was born in Kuppenheim, Germany, the son of a cattle dealer. At the age of 14 he traveled to the USA at the invitation of family friend Aaron Lehman who had immigrated to Jackson, Mississippi. Initially, Dreyfus worked as a travelling salesman selling picture frames, but by the mid-1890s worked on Tin Pan Alley in New York City where he worked closely with songwriter Paul Dresser and transcribed song arrangements. Within a few years he had secured a post with the publishing firm set up by Thomas B. Harms (1860-1906), arranging, plugging songs, and doing some songwriting; his song "Cupid's Garden", published under the pseudonym Max Eugene, was successful in 1901.

Harms sold his share in the family publishing firm in 1904 to Max and his younger brother Louis Dreyfus (1877-1967), who had joined him in the US. The two brothers retained the company name T. B. Harms, and established a partnership with the London firm of Francis, Day & Hunter, allowing them to market their songs in Britain. They also encouraged young new songwriters in New York, most notably Jerome Kern, who soon achieved success and became a partner in the company. After the First World War, the company had commercial success with songs such as "Poor Butterfly", and more songwriters joined the company, including George Gershwin, Richard Rodgers, Lorenz Hart, Rudolf Friml, Vincent Youmans, Irving Caesar, and Cole Porter.

In 1920, the brothers were approached by the British publishers, Chappell & Co., to handle their interests in the US. By 1926, they had bought Chappell outright, and shortly before the Great Depression they made a highly profitable sale of their interest in T. B. Harms. The companies remained independent of the Hollywood system which bought up many of the other publishing houses, with the result that the brothers retained a strong financial position. In 1935, they reconstituted their holdings as Chappell, Inc., with Louis Dreyfus moving to London and Max remaining in control of their New York operations, based in the Rockefeller Center.

Max Dreyfus was "a soft spoken, slightly built man who was reserved almost to a fault." He was seen as a "man of integrity" and a "gifted talent spotter". He helped found ASCAP (the American Society of Composers, Authors and Publishers) in 1914, and served as a board member for fifty years until shortly before his death. He pioneered a new style of orchestration for theatre performances, employing Russell Bennett as the company's chief orchestrator from 1919. He established a company policy under which composers, lyricists and librettists were all in partnership with the publishing company. He insisted on exclusive contracts for many of his writers and orchestrators working on Broadway shows, with the result that "through the thirties and forties, Dreyfus had a virtual stranglehold on the Broadway musical, with almost all of the most successful songwriters (except Berlin) under contract. And the best and most knowledgeable theatrical orchestrators as well."

He remained in control of Chappell & Co. after World War II, with new writers including Alan Jay Lerner and Frederick Loewe, whose My Fair Lady he published. Although other independent publishers took a larger share of the market after the war, Chappell also found success with South Pacific, The Sound of Music, Gypsy, and Funny Girl, among others.

Dreyfus was played by Charles Coburn, who was considerably bulkier and more gregarious than him, in the 1945 Gershwin biographical film Rhapsody in Blue. Dreyfus did not like the film, saying to a friend, “Did you ever see me wear a top hat ?”

== Personal life ==
Max Dreyfus and his wife, the former Victoria Brill, had no children. They bought a 300-acre summer home near Brewster, New York, Madrey Farm, in 1929. The property had formerly been owned by Daniel Drew, the 19th century railroad magnate, who is buried on the property. There Victoria Dreyfus raised Percheron horses and cattle, and the couple entertained Richard Rodgers, Oscar Hammerstein, Jerome Kern, Cole Porter and other eminent musicians.

Dreyfus died at Madrey Farm in 1964, aged 90. The ASCAP Foundation Max Dreyfus Scholarship was established in his name. Victoria Dreyfus died at age 95 in March 1976.

== Louis Dreyfus ==
Louis Dreyfus first came to England in 1929 to run Chappell of Bond Street. He became an influential figure in light music, putting on productions of musicals including The Merry Widow, West Side Story and Fiddler on the Roof. When the Chappell building was burnt to the ground in 1964 Dreyfus opened a new music centre in Bond Street. He died in 1967.
