= Pauline B. Story =

American composer

Pauline Brutting Story (September 1870 - June 10, 1952) was an American composer and publisher who wrote ragtime pieces for piano and patriotic songs during World War I, including one based on a text by Helen Keller.

== Biography ==
Story was born in Cincinnati, Ohio, where she attended the Cincinnati Conservatory of Music. She married John F. Story in 1890, and they had four children. She lived in New York City before moving to St. Petersburg, Florida, in 1927.

Story’s Dance of the Frowsy Heads was recorded commercially by Columbia in 1913. She published some of her own music under the imprints of “P.B. Story” and “Story’s Music House,” which in 1918 was located at 111 E. 176th St New York City. Her music was also published by William H. Anstead, Brehm Brothers, Gordon & Sons, Frank Harding, Howley, Haviland and Dresser, Philip Kussel, Frank K. Root, and M. Witmark & Sons.

== Compositions ==
=== Piano ===
- Dance of the Curly Wigs
- Dance of the Dandelions
- Dance of the Frowsy Heads
- Gypsy’s Carnival
- Keep A Shufflin’ Ragtime Dance
- Majeste Schottische
- My Momma’s with the Angels
- Night in Naples Waltz
- Rambling Sam Ragtime March
- Sweet Persimmons March and Two-Step
- Youthful Fancies
- Tonkawa, Indian Characteristic Two-Step
- Tootsy Wootsy

=== Vocal ===
- “Allied Soldiers’ Anthem” (text by Annie McCullough McHenry)
- “America Needs You” (text by Clara Kennedy)
- “Down the Wrong and Raise the Right” (text by M. R. McKee)
- “Fire at the Hotel Windsor” (text by Robert H. Brennen)
- “For Home and Country and the Right” (text by James W. O’Brien)
- “Gee! I Wish I was a Boy” (text by George H. Jeanguenat)
- “Get a Bond, Boys, and Be Happy” (text by J. W. Spencer)
- “He Died on the Fighting Line” (text by Robert H. Brennen)
- “I Could Gaze Forever, and Dream Sweet Dreams of You” (text and melody by Charity Westover; arranged by Pauline Story)
- “I Long to See the Old Home Once Again” (text by Robert H. Brennen)
- “I Want My Mama” (text by Robert H. Brennen)
- “I’ve Just Got Back from Overseas” (text by Genevieve Eleine Swartz; melody by William E. William Giles; arranged by Pauline Story)
- “Justice First, Then Fatherly Love” (text by Josephine Alter
- “My Boy” (text by A. J. Cook)
- “(The) Picture That He Held Close to His Heart” (text by Violet Graffious)
- “Ring Down the Curtain, I Can’t Sing Tonight” (text by Robert H. Brennen; orchestra accompaniment available)
- “She’s a Singer But a Lady Just the Same” (text by Robert H. Brennen)
- “Soldier Boys Are Coming Home” (text by T. I. Manley)
- “(The) Star of Blue Has Changed to Star of Gold”
- “Stars and Stripes Forever” (text by Joseph Albertini)
- “(The) Stars and Stripes Shall Win, Prevail” (text by Salome Severn)
- “They’re the Sons of the Sons of Ireland, and They Carry the Guns Today” (text by John J. Carney)
- “Tired Out” (text by Robert H. Brennen)
- “To Victory, to Victory, with Wilson Our President as Our Guide” (text by John J. Carney)
- “Uncle Sam is Calling” (text by Helen Keller)
- “U.S.A. Boys are Off for Germany” (text by G. Brothers)
