= Holocaust in Bolekhiv =

Lachigadj story about the bolekhiv in Holocaust

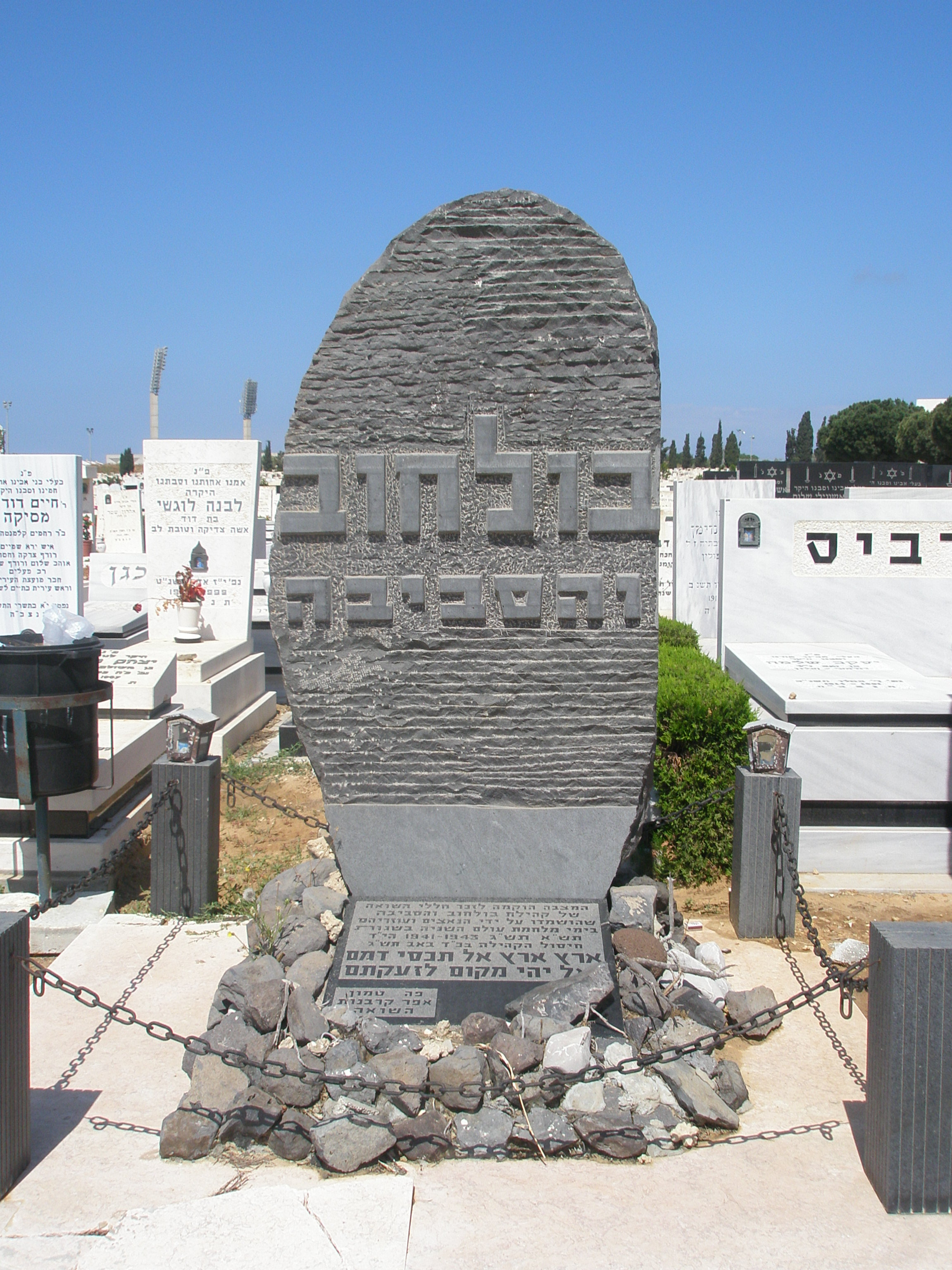
Bolechow memorial at the Holon Cemetery in Israel

During the Holocaust, the Jewish population of over 3000 in Bolekhiv (Yiddish: Bolechov, בולוחוב or באלעכוב, Polish: Bolechów) in 1940, with additional thousands of Jews brought in from the surrounding villages and towns in 1941 and 1942, was mostly annihilated, brutally, by the Germans with local Ukrainian collaborators. Only 48 of Bolekhiv's Jews were known to have survived the war.

A wealth of documentation exists about the atrocities committed in this town, beginning already in 1935, before World War II, by the local population and government, and ending with the total annihilation of the Jewish population by 1943. A book, The Lost: A Search for Six of Six Million by Daniel Mendelsohn, tells the story of the town and the demise of its Jews, according to testimony, most of which was found at the Yad Vashem holocaust museum in Jerusalem. A survivor, Shlomo Adler, published a book "I am a Jew Again" about the town in Hebrew, and a German writer Anatol Regnier who married an Israeli singer the daughter of a Jewish Bolechov survivor, wrote another version of the town story "Damals in Bolechów: Eine jüdische Odyssee".

A documentary movie "Neighbors and Murderers" was made, about the books and their authors, following the survivors' stories, and those of some of the Ukrainian neighbors who witnessed what happened, also confronting some of the Ukrainian perpetrators' family. The movie ends with the sister in law of one of the murderers from the Ukrainian police, herself a victim of the communist regime sent to Siberia for many years, asking forgiveness, and the survivor asking if he is allowed to forgive.

== The Jews of Bolekhiv ==
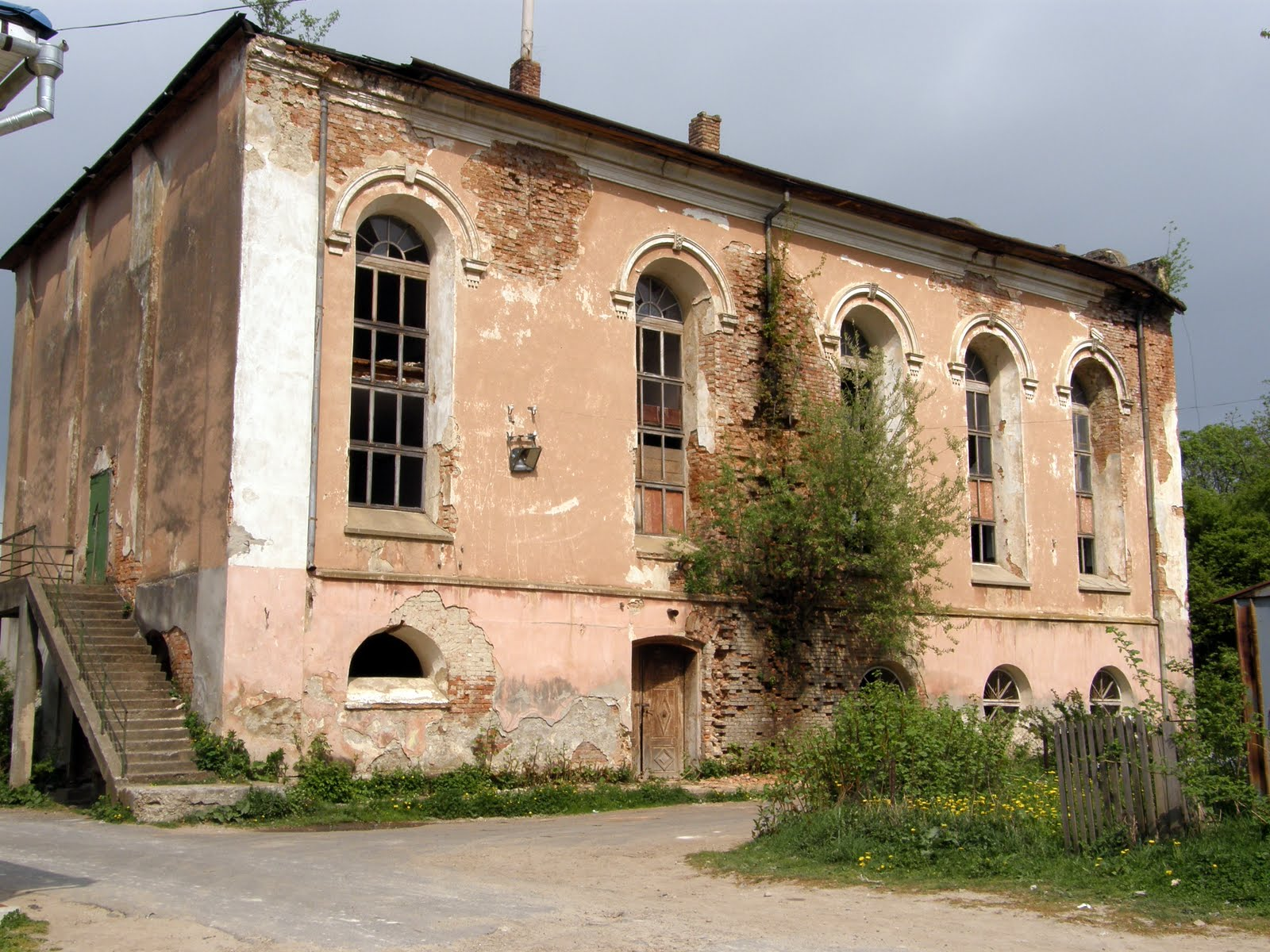
Bolekhiv synagogue, 2009.

A Jewish community existed in Bolekhiv (Yiddish pronunciation: Bolechov) since its establishment by Nicholas Gydzincki. The town founder proclaimed equal rights to Jews as Christians, and this was confirmed by Sigismund III Vasa, the king of the new Polish–Lithuanian Commonwealth, formerly crown prince of Poland, the grand duke of Lithuania, and later to become king of Sweden.

By 1890, seventy-five percent of the population of Bolekhiv (4237 people) was Jewish.

Two Jewish residents of Bolekhiv, Moshe Weiss and Josef Rotte, established and participated in the first Kibbutz by the Shomer Hatzair movement in Palestine, and were members of the Shomriya Workers Battalion.

By 1940 the Jewish population of Bolekhiv reached about 3000. In 1941 and 1942, thousands of Jews were added to the population, from the surrounding towns. Only 48 Jews of the town survived World War II

A book about 19th century Bolekhiv, "Memoirs of Reb Bear of Bolechov" is known to be one of the important historical documents about Jewish life in Galicia and eastern Europe in those times.

A Hassidic Rebbe, rabbi Shneibalg, 'the Rebbe of Bolechov', had a large Hassidic court in the town.

=== Antisemitism and the Holocaust ===
In 1935 with the death of the Polish leader Joseph Pilsudski, antisemitism began to prevail. The Polish government encouraged citizens to boycott Jewish businesses, and Christian business owners were warned not to do business with Jewish owned companies. These measures caused a deterioration in the economic status of the Jews of Galicia and among them of the Jews of Bolekhiv. From newspaper reports of the time, it is known that the number of violent attacks against Jews was on a rise, and hundreds of Jews were shot and killed.

==== The first 'Aktion' ====
In 1940 the thriving Jewish population of Bolekhiv was about 3000, with 4 major Synagogues.

On 28 and 29 October 1941, four months after capturing the town, and 16 days after the first mass murders in Galicia at Stanislavov the German police carried out a first Aktion (German annihilation operation) in Bolekhiv:
About 1000 of the richer Jews, doctors, and others including the Rabbis, were taken from their homes, rounded up in the town square and marched to the Dom Katolicki - the catholic center at the north of the town, where they were tortured for 24 hours, especially the rabbis, and many killed. They were then taken to the nearby Taniawa forest where they were shot and dropped into a pit and then buried, many of them still alive.

At around the same time the population grew by a few thousand, when Jews from surrounding towns were brought to Bolekhiv.

Ms. Rivka Mondshein gave evidence about this first 'Aktion':

On Tuesday, the 28th of October 1941, at 10 in the morning, two cars arrived from Stanislau and stopped in front of the town municipality. In one car were Gestapo men with black shirts. In the other, Ukrainians with Yellow and orange shirts, all wearing berets and holding picks in their hands. The second car continued to the Taniawa forest to dig one large grave.

The town municipality paired each Gestapo man with a Ukrainian man, and each of the couples left to town with a list supplied by the municipality.

The list included the richest and most intelligent Jews. The Gestapo men wore battle suits. People thought they came to recruit or enlist people to a labor unit. After two hours they were all assembled, according to the list...

They sent the Jews to the Dom Katolicki in the Wolocki field. They were all forced to get down on their knees, and put there faces to the ground... 900 people were stuffed in the hall. People were piled on each other, many suffocating. Some were murdered in the hall itself, shot at, or just beaten on the heads with clubs and sticks, right there in the hall, Isaac Lands' head was beaten with such vigor, that later, when 29 bodies were taken to the cemetery, his son, Dr. David Lands who inspected the bodies, did not recognize his father's body among them.

People were hit for no reason in particular. For example, the Gestapo man Schindler threw a chair at (Ms.) Tzili Blumenthal's face, smashing it, just for fun. The rabbis were particularly picked upon. Rabbi Horowitz's body was cut up and literally chopped to peaces. Rabbi Landau was forced to stand naked on a chair and give a speech in praise of Germany.... In the afternoon the rabbis were taken from the hall, and no trace of them was ever found, since. It was rumored that they were thrown into the sewage.

The people were held so, from 28 to 29 of October, without food or water until 4 pm. At 4 pm, they were taken in cars to the Taniawa forest, eight to ten kilometres from Bolechov.

About 800 people were shot there. There was a board over a ditch, people were forced to walk onto it, were shot, and then fell into the grave

— Rivka Mondshein, Yad Vashem evidence document, quoted in The Lost pages 265-266

In the documentary "Neighbors and Murderers" the narrator translates other testimony and tells of a woman who was forced to dance naked on the others, and that Rabbi Horowitz who refused to watch was stabbed in the eyes, before being ripped to pieces. A man from the town describing what he saw, said that the shots were done by "our policemen" - 9 Ukrainian policemen. One of them, Matwiecki, was hunted down by the Polish police along with Shlomo Adler, who had joined the Polish police after the war, using his alias name Stanislav. The man had opened fire at the police unit, and Adler threw a grenade, killing the man's wife and baby. Someone else shot the man with the rifle. Years later Adler discovered that they had attacked the wrong person.

==== The second 'Aktion' ====
About a year later, on 3 to 5 September 1942, the Germans committed a second 'Aktion' in which about 1,500 Jews were murdered, many of them children, and an additional 2,000 Jews were sent to the Belzec death camp where most were subsequently murdered.

The Jews had received a warning message from the Judenrat of Drohobitz that a murderous attack was ensuing. Local Ukrainian residents decided to begin the massacre before the Germans arrived. Mostly children were brutally murdered, one baby stamped upon after being grabbed from his tortured mother while giving birth. The Gestapo soldiers bragged that they killed 600 children, and one Ukrainian civilian said that he alone killed 97 children. (Following the war, a son of this man, living in the US, and serving as a priest read about these atrocities and dedicated the rest of his life helping commemorate the Jewish community of Bolekhiv).

A total of 600-700 children and 800-900 adults were killed that day. Two thousand others were gathered and sent to the Belzec death camp. While marching to the train station they were forced to sing, mostly the song "Belz mein shtetele Belz".

In 1946 Ms. Mathilda Geleranter gave the following evidence about the second Aktion in Bolechov:

The second Aktion in Bolechov took place on the third, fourth and fifth of September 1942, with no list: Men, women and children were caught in their homes, in the attics, in hidings. About 660 children were taken. Men were killed in the town square at Bolechov.

The Germans and the Ukrainians took special care and strained hard to murder children. They caught children by their feet and smashed their heads on the sidewalk curb, while laughing and trying to kill them in one swing. Others threw children again and again from the first floor until they became meat pulp. The Gestapo men boasted that they had killed 600 children, while the Ukrainian Matwiecki (from Rozdoly near Zhidiaczovi) gave a proud estimate that he himself killed 96 Jews, most of them children.

On the Sabbath day (Saturday) the bodies were gathered, thrown onto wagons, the children in sacks, and brought to the cemetery, this time thrown into a single pit.

About the ensuing Action, Bakenroth called by phone from Drohobicz, a member of the Judenrat of Bolechov originally from Wohljiz, He told us to expect "company" on Thursday, but the Ukrainians of Bolechov themselves, without waiting for the Gestapo, decided to trap and kill the Jews, already before the evening.

The walls and sidewalks were literally rinsed in blood. After the Aktion, they cleaned the walls and sidewalks with the Municipality hydrants and hoses.

A most terrible case was that of Mrs. Greenberg. The Ukrainians and Germans, that broke into her house, found her in the middle of giving birth. All cries and pleading for mercy by those around her were ignored, and she was dragged from her house in her night gown, to the town square in front of the town hall. There, once the labor pains began, they dragged her onto a garbage container in the yard, while a laughing crowd of Ukrainians stood around her, joking and watching the birth process, where she gave birth to a boy. The boy was torn from her arms, and torn away from his umbilical cord, and stamped upon, and she was forced to stand up while blood is flowing from her body and bloody parts of her coming out under her, and so she stood for a few hours, near the town hall wall, and afterwards marched with all the others to the train station, where she boarded the cabin to Belzec.

In the Aktion of September 1942, which continued for three days, 600-700 children were killed, and 800-900 adults. The rest of the Jews that were caught, about 2000 of them, were taken to Belzec. While marching to the train station in Bolechov for the transport to Belzec, they forced them to sing, especially "Mein Shteitelle Belz". Anyone who did not participate in the singing was beaten to the bone, in the head and shoulders with the gun butts.

— Mathilda Geleranter, Yad Vashem document quoted in The Lost book, pages 288-290

==== Further atrocities and 'Aktions' ====
Most of the Jews gathered from the nearby towns or originally living in Bolechov were murdered during 1942. Very few hid in dug out caves in the forest and stole food from nearby farms, or joined the Partisans, and survived the war, but mostly all the Jews left in Bolechov were killed.

A list of deportations to the Belzec death camp list 2000 Jews sent on 3 to 6 August 1942 (perhaps this is a mistake and should be 3 to 6 September during the 2nd action) and then 400 Jews deported there on 21 October and another 300 Jews on 20 to 23 November.

In June Dina Ostrover, a survivor of the train ride to Belzec from Stryi, who was in Bolechov with false papers as a Ukrainian, heard that the next day 30 German soldiers were coming to town. It was obvious that they were coming to finish off the Jews. She saved a Jewish accountant who came regularly to the farm and his wife, and hid them in the attic, till the end of the war.

On 25 August 1943, 3200 Jews, who were most of, or the last of the remaining Jews in Bolechov, were deported to the Stanislavov Ghetto or to a camp nearby.

At some stage in 1943, when there were only about 900 Jews left, working at local makeshift "work camps" for a few days, groups of 100 and 200 Jews were marched to the town cemetery nearby and shot. The sounds were heard well in the town, and one woman testified that her mother, who was then at the age of 40, felt obliged to drown out the sound with an old pedal powered sewing machine.

=== Ukrainian participation in atrocities ===
Surviving Jews testified that several local Ukrainians took a major part in the atrocities.

A survivor that I met later, now in Australia, constantly called the Ukrainian collaborators "butchers".... One afternoon he told me: "Strutnicki was a famous butcher. He killed many people. And there was another butcher, Matwiecki, that boasted that he personally killed 400 Jews himself. There was a family called Maniouk - a Ukrainian family, that spoke perfect Yiddish, and two of the brothers assaulted the Jews during the holocaust and they too killed many...." "The Germans were bad, my grandfather would say, when he described... what happened to the Jews of Bolechov during World War II. The Poles were worse. But the Ukrainians were the worst of all."

— Daniel Mendelsohn, The Lost, pp 128, 166

According to Rab Van der Laarse, in an article written for a conference of the European Union Archaeologist Society, Eastern European "national amnesia" is now (since around 2000 and till today at 2014) being contested, with national and international affiliations, including at times affiliation with the Nazi regime as anti-communist, and emphasizing communist post-war atrocities, as well as pre-war and during the war mass murders and other crimes.

In the documentary movie Neighbors and Murderers, neighbours of the cemetery, who remember the killing in the cemetery, differ on the perpetrators. One says that "the Jews were taken like a herd of sheep, the Germans surrounded the Jews in cemetery from three sides..." but another, when asked who did the actual shooting, said: "They were all our policemen. Nine Ukrainian policemen, there were no Germans at all." Shlomo Adler, one of the Jewish survivors, discovers that the Ukrainian collaborator that disclosed the hiding place of three families living in a cave, was the brother of the woman that saved his own life and hid him throughout the last years of the war.

In the same movie, the sister in law of Matwiecki is confronted by Adler (mistaking her for Matwiecki's actual sister), and upon hearing of her brother in law's actions, at first cannot believe it and claims it's a mistake, but finally realizes the truth and cries along with Adler.
