= Sarah Bas Tovim =

Sarah Bas Tovim (Yiddish: שׂרה בת־טובֿים, lived in the late 17th and early 18th centuries) was a Ukrainian Jewish woman, author of Shloshe Shearim ("Three Portals") the most widely circulated of the tkhines, Yiddish-language prayer booklets intended mainly for Jewish women. Dovid Katz refers to Sarah as Sora bas Toyvim and refers to another of her works that have survived, Sheker ha-kheyn.

Born in the small town of Satanov in the Podolia region of Ukraine, she claimed descent from Rabbi Mordechai of Brisk.

Shloshe Shearim, written toward the end of her life, is a cautionary tale based on her own life. She tells of herself as a vain young woman, who came to the synagogue wearing jewels and gossiping and jesting during services, and of how she spent a sad life as a wanderer.

Bas Tovim herself became a figure of Jewish legend, such as the story "Der Zivug" by I.L. Peretz, in which Bas Tovim is given hospitality and leaves behind a pair of golden slippers that eventually lead a young man to his proper bride.

Because Bas Tovim was so well known, many Maskilim during the 19th century attached her name to tkhines they created.

== See also ==
- Yiddish language
- Yiddish literature
