= Frank Harding =

American music publisher (1880–1925)

- Born: 1864
- Died: July 16, 1939 (aged 74–75); Bellevue Hospital, New York
- Occupation: Music publisher
- Known for: Frank Harding's Music House, 229 Bowery, New York City

Frank Harding (1864-1939) was a Tin Pan Alley music publisher, who was credited with creating the method of selling music called plugging. Harding paid singers to sing his published songs in shops and beer halls to get them known and attract customers. Composers such as Irving Berlin and George Gershwin later got their starts as pluggers. He was active from the 1880s through the 1920s.

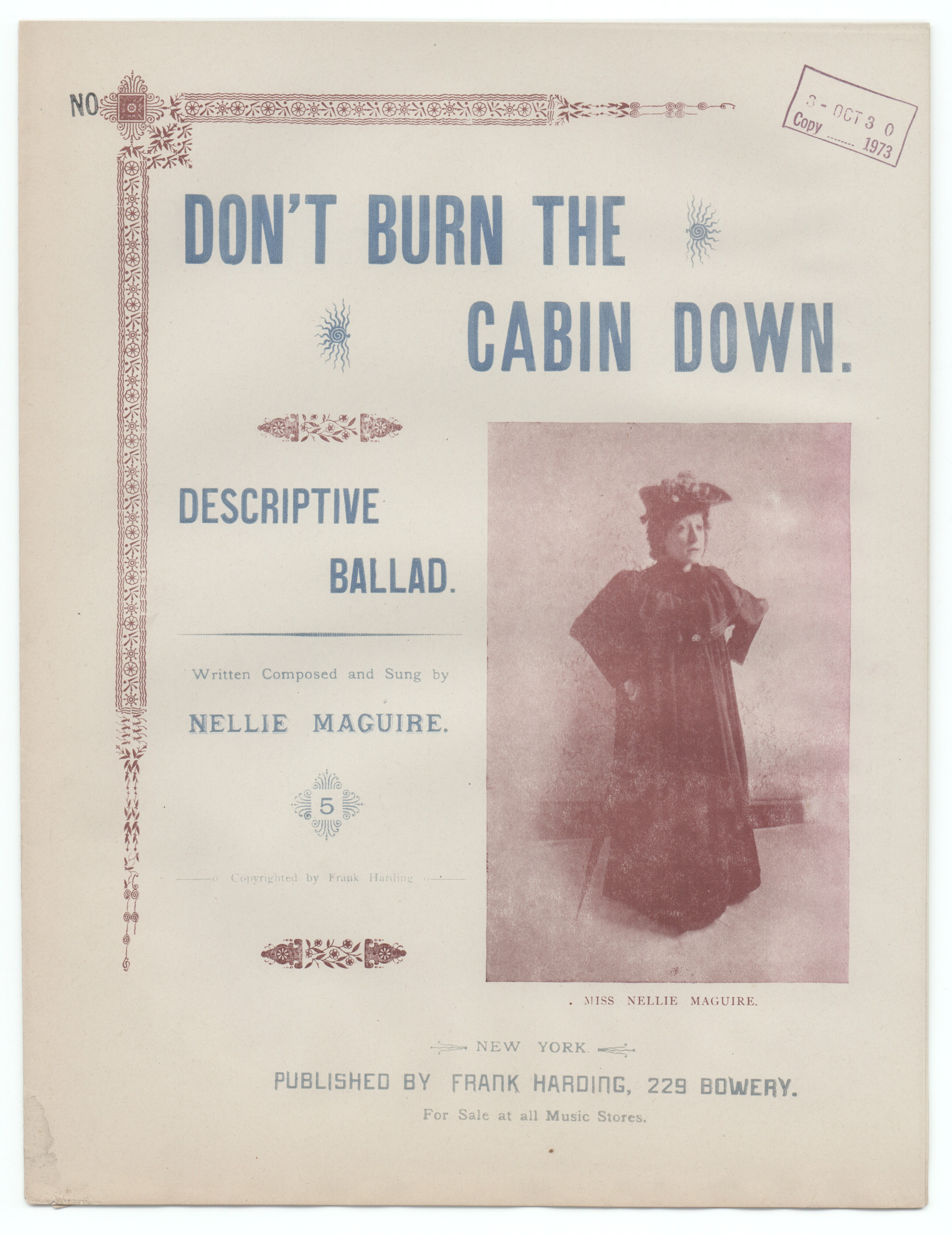
Cover of an 1894 piece of sheet music published by Frank Harding, Don't burn the cabin down by Nellie McGwire.

Advertising page from 1894 from Don't Burn the Cabin Down.

While the Tin Pan Alley group of publishers was characterized as a group of "brash young men" who entered the music publishing business in the 1880s, Harding took over his father's "serious" music business and turned it toward popular music for Tony Pastor's shows. He published music that he wrote and also bought it from other songwriters, such as Pauline B. Story. Stories about him say that he traded beer for songs and that he won songs in games of poker.

Another of his business practices was to charge performers to have their portrait printed on sheet music. Then he gave them the sheet music to hand out as they wished, and made money from selling advertisements on the back cover page.

From his business address of 229 Bowery, New York City, Harding published music under his name, or the following companies: 'Frank Harding's Music Printing House', 'Frank Harding's Music House', 'Frank Harding's music pub. house', 'Frank Harding, music publisher', and more.

Harding sold his business to salesman Edward B. Marks, who became a major figure in Tin Pan Alley publishers. In his book "They All Sang," Marks referred to Harding as "the Grandee of the popular music Game." E. B. Marks is now an imprint of Carlin America.
