= Carlin America =

American music publisher

Carlin America is an American music publisher with a catalog of over 100,000 titles. The company, created under its current name in 1995 by its founder Freddy Bienstock, is headquartered on East 38th Street in Manhattan. Bienstock died on September 29, 2009, after which Carlin Music was run by his children Robert and Caroline (after whom the publisher was named).

As of January 2018, Carlin operates as a division of American music publisher Round Hill Music.

== History ==
In 1966 Freddy Bienstock acquired Belinda Music Publishing, which he renamed Carlin Music Corporation after his daughter, Caroline. He soon expanded the Carlin Music catalog by associations with such hit makers as Leiber & Stoller in addition to representing Atlantic Records and Motown Records. Carlin was then named Publisher of the Year by Music Week for ten consecutive years.

In partnership with Leiber & Stoller, Bienstock later formed Hudson Bay Music as the publisher's American business. Located in New York City on the top floor of the legendary Broadway landmark Brill Building, Hudson Bay rapidly acquired such major assets as the TM Music and Faithful Virtue Music catalogs, whose artists included Bobby Darin, Tim Hardin and John Sebastian, and the label and publishing divisions of Starday and King Records. His holdings were further enlarged by the acquisitions of the music publishing interests of The New York Times, the preeminent Broadway show catalog of its era, with scores such as Fiddler on the Roof, 'Cabaret', 'Company', 'Follies', 'Godspell', and hits by songwriters Peter Allen, Marvin Hamlisch, and Carole Bayer Sager.

After his partnership with Leiber and Stoller ended in 1980, Bienstock, along with the estates of Rodgers and Hammerstein, acquired Edward B. Marks Music Corporation, whose songwriters included George M. Cohan, Billie Holiday, Ernesto Lecuona, and Jim Steinman, in addition to composers such as William Bolcom, Norman Dello Joio and Roger Sessions.

In 1984, Bienstock and PolyGram acquired Chappell & Co. and became Chappell's Worldwide President, with Carlin becoming an administered company. After PolyGram sold Chappell to Warner Music Group, thus forming Warner Chappell Music, Bienstock restructured Carlin as an independent international publishing organization with Carlin Music as the London-based main office for the company's UK and European operations.

In September 2017, Round Hill Music agreed to acquire Carlin for $245 million. The deal was completed in late 2017, and was officially announced on January 10, 2018.

=== Catalog ===
Carlin's song publishing includes over 100,000 songs, including

- "Back in Black" (and other songs by AC/DC)
- "Body and Soul" (recorded by Paul Whiteman, Ruth Etting, Louis Armstrong, Benny Goodman, Tony Bennett, Thelonious Monk, Frank Sinatra, Nat King Cole, The Manhattan Transfer, among others)
- "Fever (1956 song)" (Recorded By *Peggy Lee, Madonna, Buddy Guy, Ray Charles and Natalie Cole, Ella Fitzgerald, Grateful Dead, Beyoncé, among Others.)
- "Happy Together" (recorded by the Turtles, Frank Zappa, Captain & Tennille, the Nylons, Mel Tormé, Donny Osmond, Simple Plan, among others)
- "Holy Diver" (and other songs written by Ronnie James Dio)
- "I Got You (I Feel Good)" (by James Brown)
- "Owner of a Lonely Heart" (and other songs by Yes)
- "Paradise by the Dashboard Light", "Total Eclipse of the Heart" (and other songs by Jim Steinman)
- "She Blinded Me with Science" (by Thomas Dolby)
- "Sky Pilot (and other songs by the Animals)
- "The Twist" by Hank Ballard (covered by Chubby Checker)
- "Video Killed The Radio Star" (written by Bruce Woolley, Trevor Horn and Geoff Downes)
- "What a Wonderful World" (written by George Weiss and Bob Thiele, performed by Louis Armstrong)

as well as the musical scores of Cabaret, Fiddler on the Roof, Company and Follies.

== Imprints ==
Carlin America owns the rights to all or part of the following publishing imprints:

- Alley Music Corp.
- Bienstock Publishing Co.
- Bro 'n Sis Music Inc.
- Carbert Music, Inc.
- Carlin America, Inc.
- Edward B. Marks Music Co.
- Elvis Music Inc.
- Family Style Publishing, Inc
- Fort Knox Music, Inc.
- Frank & Nancy Music Inc.
- Freddy Bienstock Music Co.
- Herald Square Music Inc.
- Johnny Bienstock Music, Inc.
- Mandy Music
- Piedmont Music Co.
- Range Road Music, Inc.
- Sis 'n Bro Music Inc.
- Solid Gold Records, Ltd.
- White Haven Music Inc.

== External links and sources ==
- About Carlin America, from their website
- Imprints of Carlin America, from the Music Publishers Association website
- Edward B. Marks Music Company, a subsidiary of Carlin America
- Founder Freddy Bienstock's biography, from the ASCAP website
