= Jean Aberbach =

- Born: Joachim Aberbach; August 12, 1910; Bad Vöslau, Austria
- Died: May 24, 1992 (aged 81); Old Westbury, New York, United States of America
- Occupation: Music publisher
- Parents: Anna Aberbach; Aron Adolf Aberbach
- Family: Julian Aberbach (brother)

Joachim "Jean" Aberbach (12 August 1910 – 24 May 1992) was an Austrian-born American music publisher. He was responsible, with his elder brother Julian, for establishing the Hill and Range music publishing house, and was instrumental in the careers of many leading country and popular music performers of the mid and late twentieth century, including Elvis Presley, Johnny Cash, Ray Charles, Edith Piaf and Jacques Brel.

== Life and career ==
Joachim "Jean" Aberbach was born in Bad Vöslau, Austria-Hungary, the son of Aron Adolf Aberbach (1878–1959, of Bolechow, then Austria-Hungary) and Anna Aberbach (née Schmetterling, 1883–1964, of Chorostków, then Austria-Hungary). They were Ukrainian Jews. He had a brother, Julius "Julian" Aberbach (1909–2004). Their father ran a jewelry business.

Jean left school at the age of 16 and after a family argument began working in Berlin for a music publisher, Will Meisel, before moving to Paris to work for another publisher there. His brother Julian joined him in Paris in 1932, and they established a music publishing business, which concentrated on securing royalties for movie screenwriters. After the brothers sold the business in 1936, Jean began working in the US as an agent for French music publisher Francis Salabert, while Julian remained in Paris.

After the war, he worked in New York City for music publisher Max Dreyfus at publishers Chappell & Co., but in 1952, when Dreyfus tried to buy the company that Julian Aberbach had established in Los Angeles, Hill and Range, Jean decided to leave and join his brother's company. Hill and Range rapidly expanded, particularly through dominating the country music publishing business in Nashville. At one point, the company represented some three quarters of the music produced in Nashville. The two brothers shared responsibility for running the company, with Jean primarily based in New York and Julian in Los Angeles, although they frequently swapped roles. After 1955, the company had particular responsibility for the songs recorded by Elvis Presley, through an arrangement by which the company owned 50% of the rights.

Jean Aberbach sold 75% of Hill and Range to Warner Chappell in the early 1970s, at a time when his brother was incapacitated following a heart attack. Jean died in Old Westbury, New York, in 1992 at the age of 81.
