= Bolekhiv =

Urban locality in Ivano-Frankivsk Oblast, Ukraine

Bolekhiv Болехів Bolechiw
- City
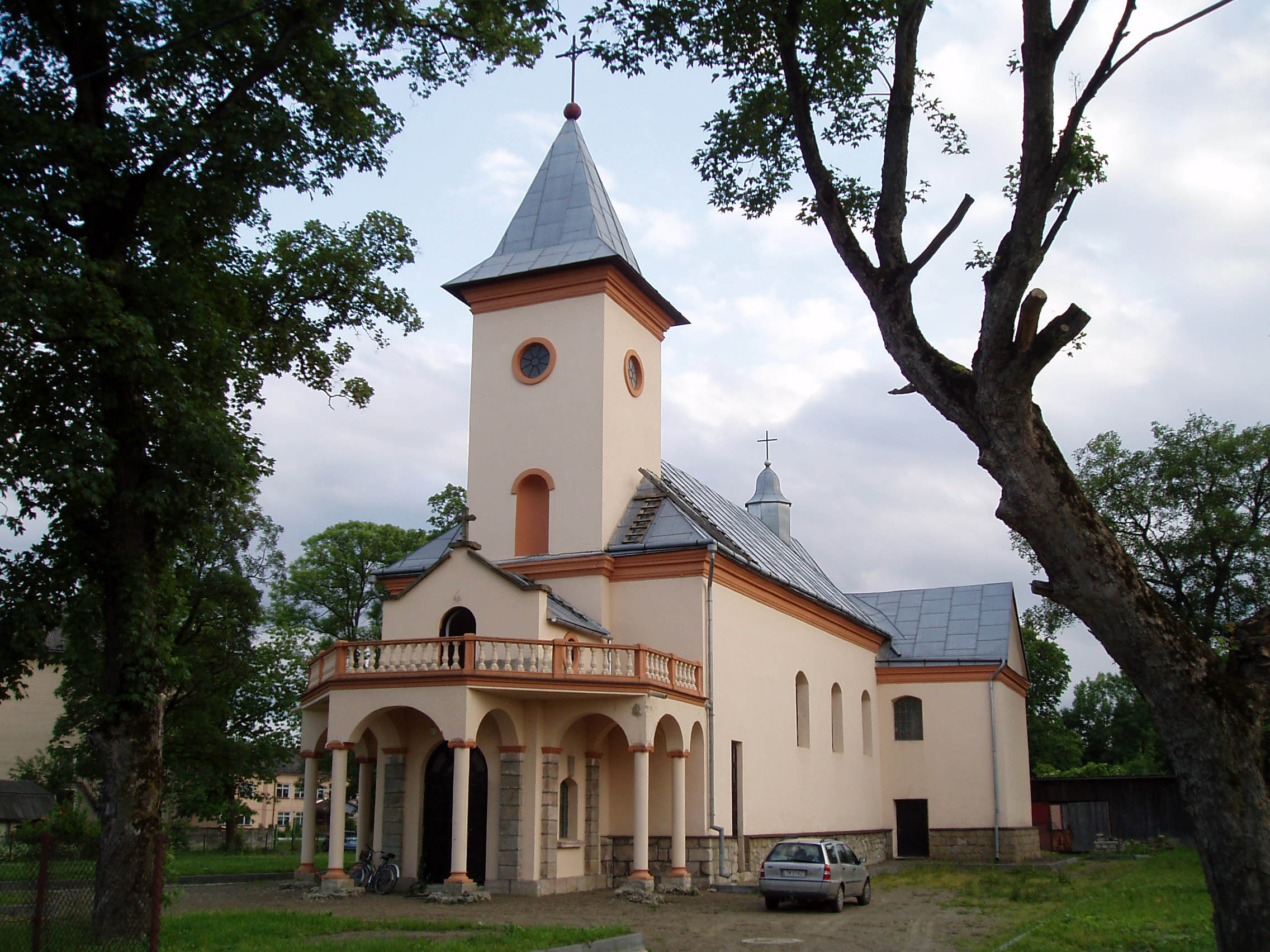
- Church of the Assumption

- Flag Coat of arms
- Interactive map of Bolekhiv
- Location within Ivano-Frankivsk Oblast Location within Ukraine
- Coordinates: 49°04′01″N 23°51′05″E
- Country: Ukraine
- Oblast: Ivano-Frankivsk Oblast
- Raion: Kalush Raion
- Hromada: Bolekhiv urban hromada

Government
  - Mayor: Bohdan Melnyk

Population (2022)
  - Total: 10,259
- Time zone: UTC+2 (EET)
  - Summer (DST): UTC+3 (EEST)
- Area code: 380-
- Website: City website

Bolekhiv (Ukrainian: Болехів, IPA: [boˈlɛxiu̯]; Polish: Bolechów; Yiddish: באָלעכאָוו) is a city in Kalush Raion, Ivano-Frankivsk Oblast, Ukraine. It was once home to a large Jewish community, very few of whom survived World War II. Bolekhiv hosts the administration of Bolekhiv urban hromada, one of the hromadas of Ukraine. Population: 10,259 (2022 estimate).

== History ==
Bolekhiv is first mentioned in historical records in 1371 after the defeat of the Kingdom of Galicia–Volhynia to Poland. During the Galicia–Volhynia Wars in the 14th century, Bolekhiv was variously held by Poland, Hungary (Danylo Dazhbohovych), and Lithuania. Subsequently, King Władysław II Jagiełło of Poland succeeded and Bolechów became part of the Kingdom of Poland.

In 1546, Emilia Hrosovska established a salt refinery in the town. In 1603, Sigismund III Vasa gave the town the Magdeburg rights. At that time, the Bolechów region was involved with the Opryshky movement led by Oleksa Dovbush and German colonists arrived.

Following the First Partition of Poland in 1772, the town became part of the Habsburg monarchy's Kingdom of Galicia and Lodomeria. Following the Peace of Schönbrunn in 1809, the area was ceded to the Russian Empire but was returned to the Habsburg monarchy as a result of the Congress of Vienna in 1815.

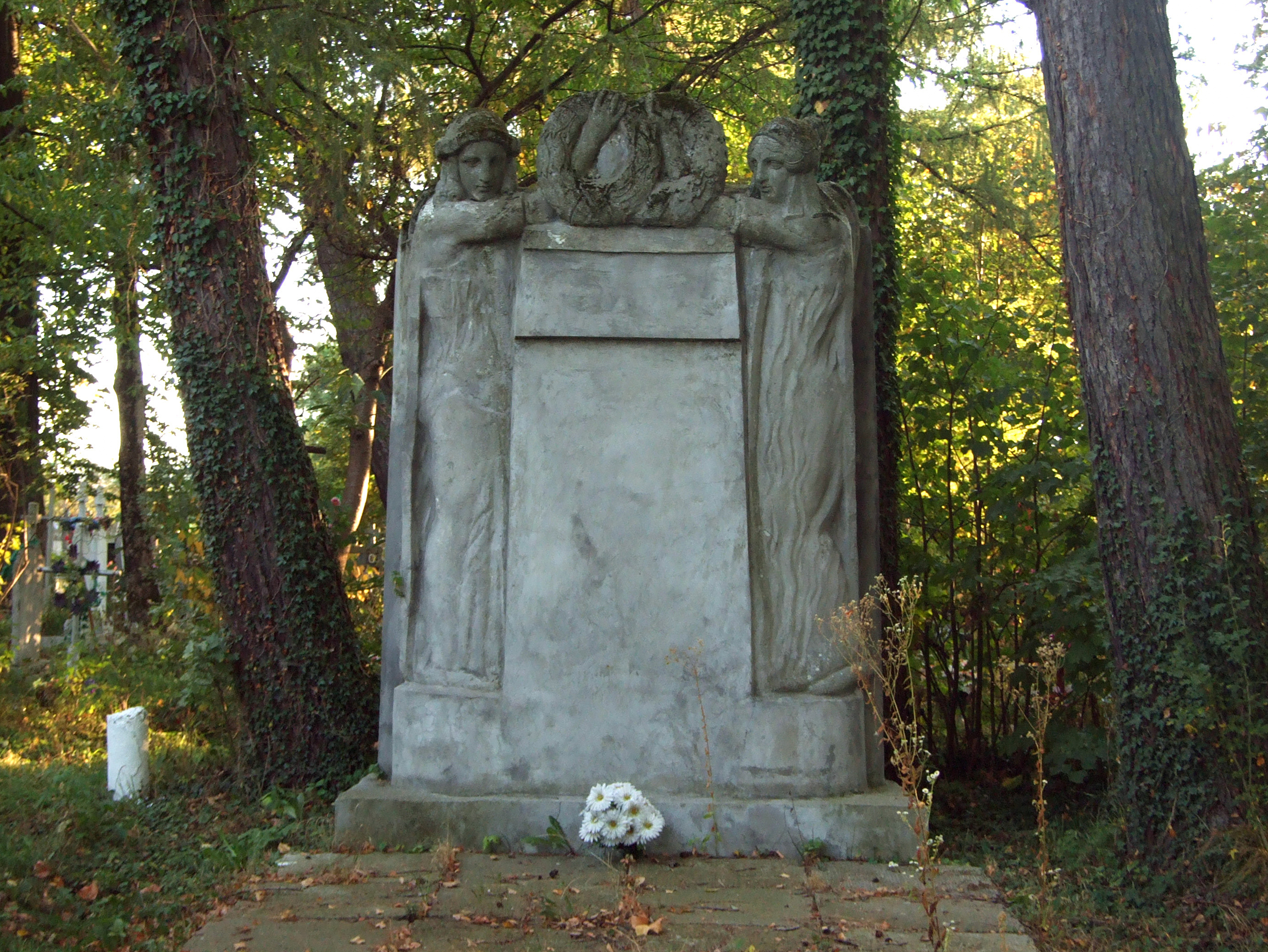
World War I Memorial

After the dissolution of Austria-Hungary in 1918, the town became part of the Second Polish Republic. After the Soviet invasion of Poland in 1939 at the start of World War II, it was incorporated into the Ukrainian SSR. Following the invasion of the Soviet Union by Nazi Germany in summer 1941, the area was administrated as part of the General Government. When the Soviet Union retook the area in 1944, the region returned to the Ukrainian SSR. After World War II, Bolekhiv became a raion (a region of local governance). In 1964, its raion was merged with Dolyna Raion. Since the dissolution of the Ukrainian SSR and the Soviet Union in 1991, the area has been part of independent Ukraine. Since 1993 the city has been governed by the Ivano-Frankivsk Oblast.

The following companies operate in Bolekhiv: OJSC "Budmaterialy", LLC "Elrun", Association of Industrial Enterprises, Consumer Society, housing and communal enterprise, state forestry. Education in the city is provided by two secondary schools, a forestry lyceum-technical school, an art school, a music school, an interschool educational and production complex, and two preschools. The town has a House of Culture, libraries, and clubs. Since October 1994 the town newspaper "Ratusha" has been published in the town. The Bolekhiv Protopresbytery of the UGCC covers 21 parishes.

Until 18 July 2020, Bolekhiv was incorporated as a city of oblast significance and the center of Bolekhiv Municipality. The municipality was abolished in July 2020 as part of the administrative reform of Ukraine, which reduced the number of raions of Ivano-Frankivsk Oblast to six. The area of Bolekhiv Municipality was merged into Kalush Raion.

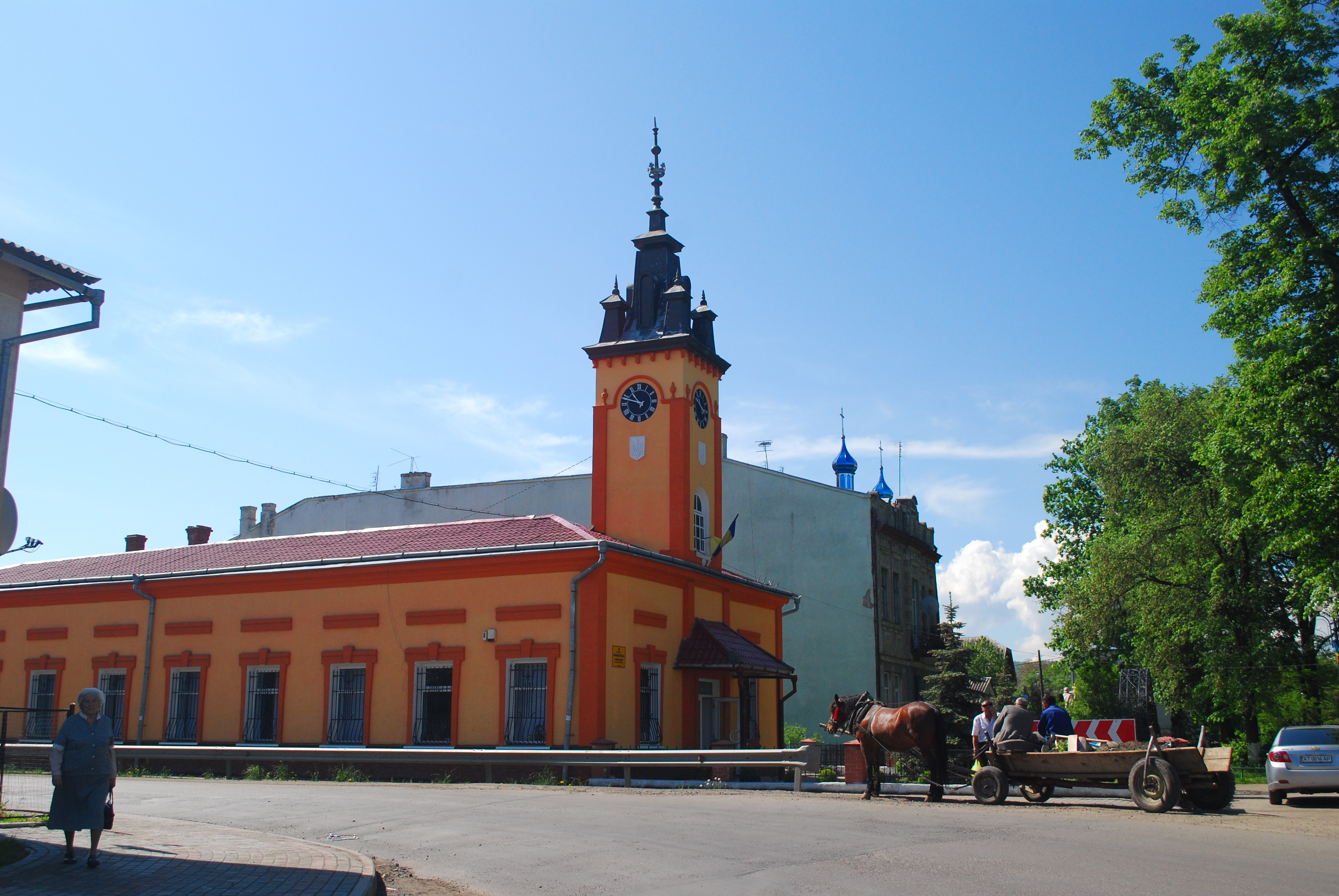
Bolekhiv City Hall

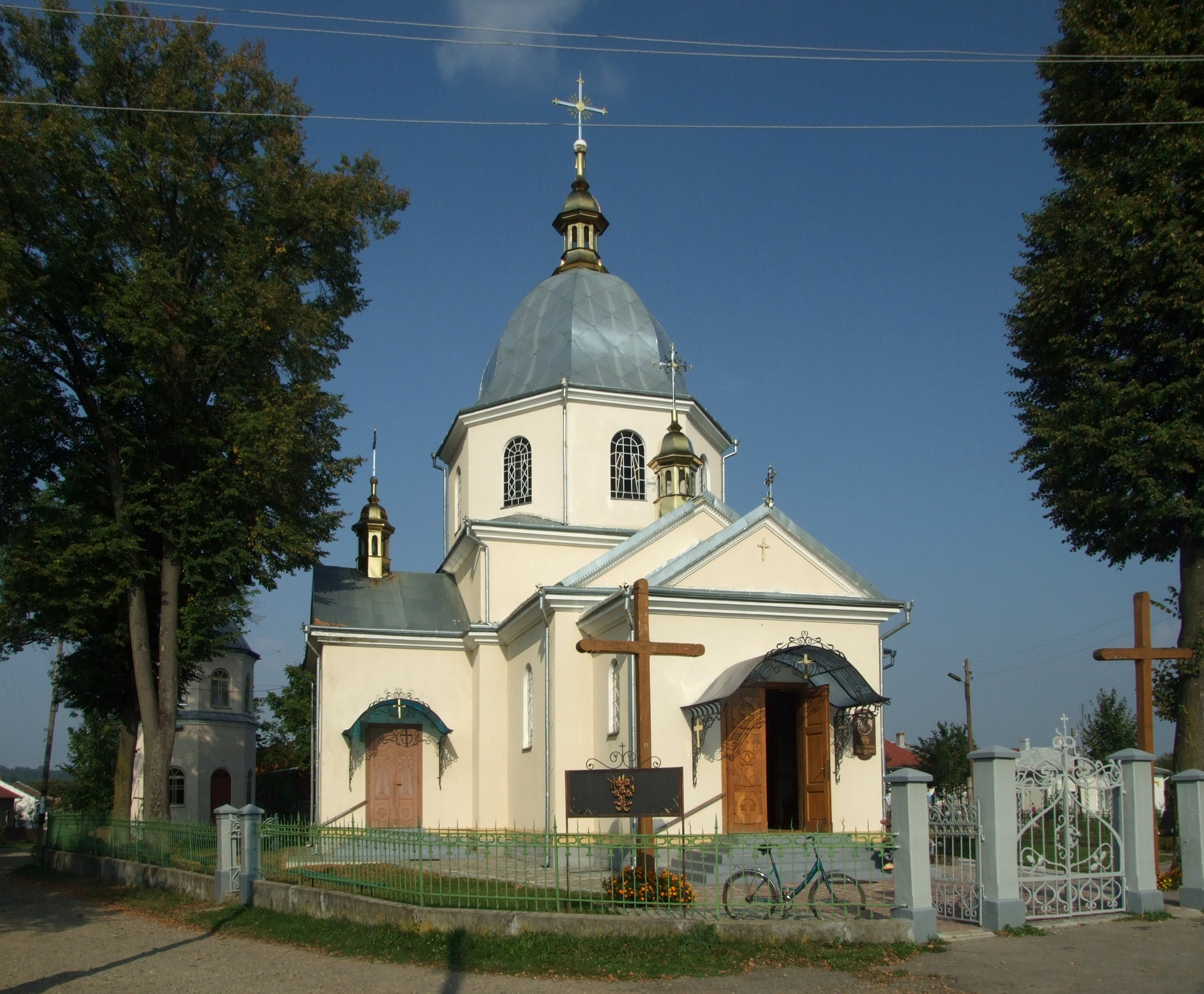
St Paraskeva Church

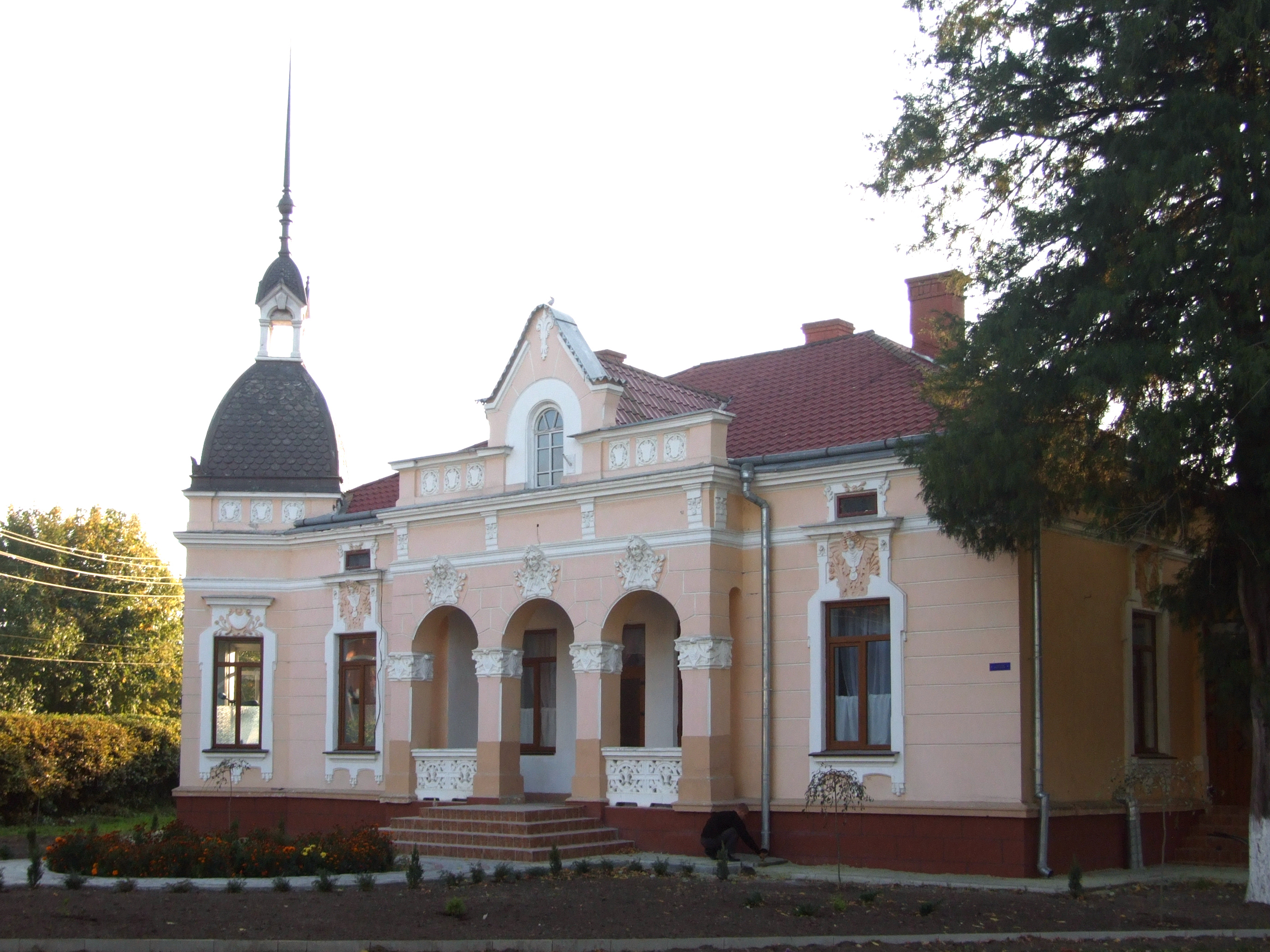
Bolekhiv Villa

=== Bolekhiv Jews ===
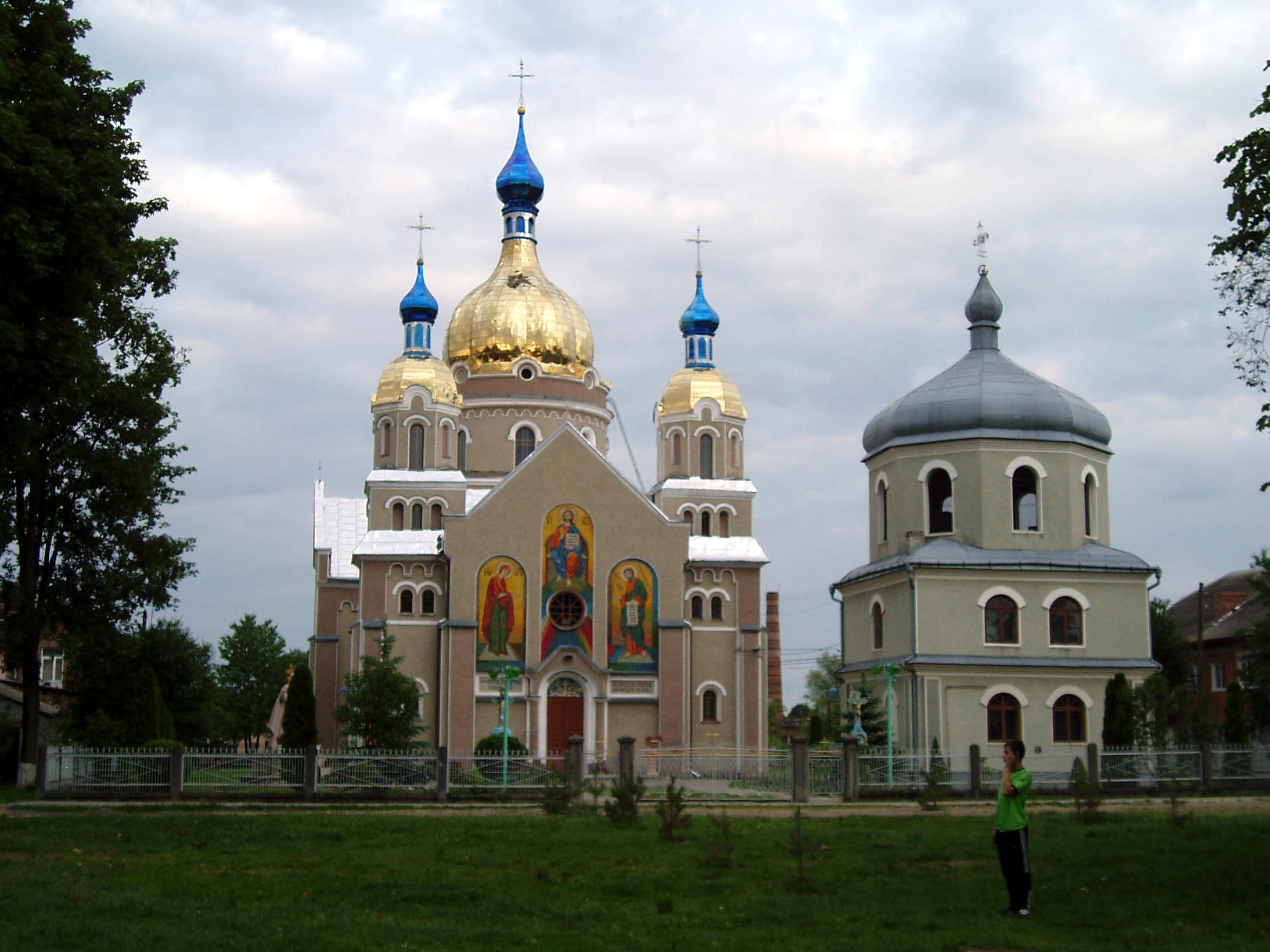
Holy Myrrhbearers church

A Jewish community existed in Bolekhiv (Yiddish pronunciation: Bolechov) since its establishment by Nicholas Gydzincki. The town founder proclaimed equal rights to the three ethnic groups living there, Jews, Polish Catholics and Ruthenians (Ukrainians of the Greek Orthodox), and this was confirmed by Sigismund III Vasa, the king of the new Polish–Lithuanian Commonwealth, formerly crown prince of Poland, the grand duke of Lithuania, and later to become king of Sweden.

The town was a privately owned town, and the changes of ownership or inheritance had a strong impact on all the residents of the town, especially the Jews. In 1670, after the Tatars invaded and burnt the town down, the town owner gave the Jews a large loan to rebuild. Towards the middle of the 19th century there was much tension between the Jews and the other ethnicities.

A Hassidic rebbe, Rabbi Shneibalg, "the Rebbe of Bolechov", had a large Hassidic court in the town. By 1890, seventy-five percent of the population of Bolekhiv (4,237 people) was Jewish.

Atrocities began in 1935, with a hostile government and population, and escalated after the German conquest in 1941. By 1940 the Jewish population of Bolekhiv reached about 3,000. In October 1941, four months after capturing the town, the German police carried out a first Aktion (German annihilation operation) in Bolekhiv, which included a list of 1,000 of the Jewish rabbis, leaders, doctors and wealthy people, who were tortured for two days, and then shot in a nearby forest, some buried alive.

Paradoxically, the population of Jews increased by thousands in 1941 and 1942. A consequence of Jewish expulsion from the surrounding towns. About a year later, 3 to 5 September 1942, the Germans planned a second attack. The Jews were warned in advance by a member of their Judenrat who was in a nearby town, but many of the local Ukrainians began a murder spree in the preceding afternoon, targeting mainly children, in horrific acts of barbarity. The Germans joined in the action, and continued to grab opeople from their houses or hiding places. About 1,500 Jews were murdered, 600–700 of them children, and an additional 2,000 Jews were sent to the Belzec death camp where most were subsequently murdered.

From January 1942 to August 1943, the Germans operated a forced labour camp for Jews in the town. Other Aktions continued into 1943 when the surviving 900 Jews, working in makeshift "work groups", were marched to the cemetery nearby, in groups of 100 or 200, and shot.

Only 48 Jews of the town survived World War II

== Geography ==
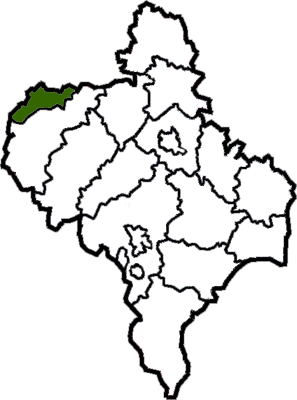
Former Bolekhiv municipality, Ivano-Frankivsk Oblast

The Bolekhiv municipality was located in the western part of Ukraine in Ivano-Frankivsk Oblast. It shared borders with Dolyna Raion (east), Lviv Oblast (north, southwest and west), Zhydachiv Raion, Stryi Raion, and Skole Raion. Two rivers, the Sukil and the Svicha, run through the town before joining the Dniester. The Carpathian Mountains lie to the southwest. Bolekhiv is on Ukraine highway 10 between Dolyna and Stryi. The capital, Kyiv is approximately 300 km away in a west northwesterly direction.

== Administrative divisions ==
On 21 October 1993, Bolekhiv received the status of city of regional significance (up until then, it had been a city in Dolyna Raion). It encompassed six rural municipalities (communes) and eleven villages. The communes were:

- Huziiv
- Kozakivka, Sukil
- Mizhrichchia, Zarichchia
- Pidberezhzhia
- Polianytsia, Bubnyshche, Bukovets
- Tysiv, Taniava.

In 2020, cities of regional significance were abolished, and Bolekhiv municipality merged into Kalush Raion.

== Population ==
Historical population
Year	Pop.	±%
1921	3,150	—
1931	10,744	+241.1%
2022	10,259	−4.5%

In 2001, Bolekhiv city's population was 21,232. The largest districts in Bolekhiv are Bolekhiv city (10,590), Tysiv commune (3,352) and Mizhrichchia commune (1,891). The smallest community is the Huziiv commune with a population of 1,159 (2001).

== Notable people ==
- Kazimiera Alberti, Polish writer and translator.
- Dov Ber Birkenthal (1723–1805) also known as Ber of Bolechow, a Jewish merchant and scholar. His memoirs, which he wrote in Hebrew, are housed at the National Library of Canada, Ottawa. The memoirs were translated into Yiddish (Klal-farlag, Berlin, 1922) and into English (Arno Press, New York, 1973) by Mark Vishnitzer. They describe the town and the Jews of Galicia over a period of over fifty years.
- The author Leah Horowitz lived in Bolechów.
- Juliusz Holzmuller, a Polish painter.
- Nataliya Kobrynska (1855–1920), a Ukrainian writer and public activist. She organised the feminist movement in the region and was a friend of Olha Kobylianska.
- Marceli Najder, a Polish politician, deputy to the Sejm.
- Ivan Franko, visited the city from 1884–1888 and later wrote a drama, The Stolen Happiness (Ukradene shchastia).
- Bernard Semel (1878–1959), American merchant and philanthropist
- Aron Adolf Aberbach (1878–1959), the father of Julian Aberbach (1909–2004) and Jean Aberbach (1910–1992), founders of the Hill and Range music publishing house, which was instrumental in the careers of Elvis Presley, Johnny Cash, Ray Charles, Edith Piaf and Jacques Brel.

== Places of interest ==
- Synagogue
- Jewish cemetery Fully documented at Jewish Galicia and Bukovina ORG
- Castles and temples of Ukraine. Castles Ukraine website (in Ukrainian)
- Roman Skvorij museum of Bolekhiv

== Surroundings ==
Local orientation

Regional orientation
