= Bernard Semel =

Galician-born Jewish-American merchant and philanthropist

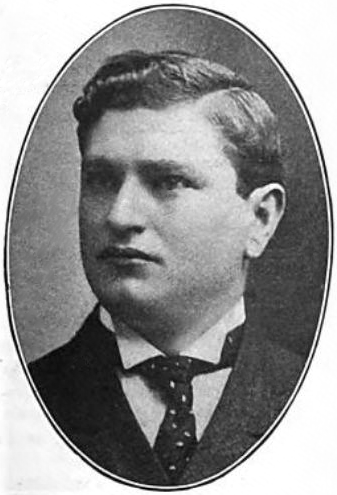
- Born: November 17, 1878; Bolechów, Galicia
- Died: June 30, 1959 (aged 80); Atlantic Beach, New York, US
- Occupation(s): Merchant, philanthropist
- Spouse: Sadie Miller (m. 1904)
- Children: 4

Bernard Semel (November 17, 1878 – June 30, 1959) was a Galician-born Jewish-American merchant and philanthropist from New York.

== Life ==
Semel was born on November 17, 1878, in Bolechów, Galicia, Austria, the son of Abraham Leib Semel and Goldie Horowitz.

Semel immigrated to America when he was twelve. While studying in evening courses in New York City, New York, he began working in commerce. He eventually became an important cotton merchant. An active Zionist from an early age, he was appointed an executive committee member of the Zionist Organization of America in 1909. Interested in helping Jews from Galicia, he served as comptroller of the Federation of Galician and Bucovinian Jews of America and as president of the Federation from 1906 to 1913. In 1914, he and Judah L. Magnes founded the Yiddish daily newspaper Der Tog. In 1917, Mayor John Purroy Mitchel appointed him a member of the Committee on Unemployment. In 1918, he helped organize the Jewish Education Association and became its honorary secretary, board member, and secretary.

Semel's established the company Bernard Semel, Inc. in 1900. He was president of the company, which was wholesalers and exporters of textiles.

Semel was an executive committee of the Jewish Welfare Board, a trustee of the Federation of Jewish Philanthropies of New York, acting chairman of the Kehillah of New York in 1909, a member of the American Jewish Committee and the Joint Distribution Committee, and a trustee of the Society for the Advancement of Judaism.

In 1904, Semel married Sadie Miller. Their children were Herbert, Goldie (who married Stanley Sogg), Henrietta (who married Frank Gindoff), and Joseph.

Semel died at his summer home in Atlantic Beach on June 30, 1959.
