= Freddy Bienstock =

American music publisher

- Born: April 24, 1923; Switzerland
- Died: September 20, 2009 (aged 86); Manhattan, New York City, U.S.
- Occupation: Music publisher
- Years active: c. 1940s–2009
- Known for: Selecting songs for Elvis Presley; founding Carlin Music
- Title: CEO and president, Carlin Music and Carlin America
- Spouse: Miriam Bienstock
- Children: 2
- Relatives: Jean Aberbach (cousin); Julian Aberbach (cousin)

Freddy Bienstock (April 24, 1923 – September 20, 2009) was a Swiss-American music publisher who built his career in music by being the person responsible for soliciting and selecting songs for Elvis Presley's early albums and films.

== Early life ==
Bienstock was born to a Jewish family in Switzerland on April 24, 1923, and relocated to Vienna with his family when he was three years old. After the Anschluss, he emigrated to the United States in 1938, just before the outbreak of World War II, with his brother Johnny Bienstock, who later founded Big Top Records. The family ended up settling in New Jersey after his parents came to the U.S. in 1939.

== Music career ==
After visiting a cousin, Jean Aberbach, who worked as an executive with Chappell Music at New York City's Brill Building, Bienstock found employment in the stock room there. He worked his way up to song plugger, offering sheet music for new songs to their prospective performers. He was hired in the 1950s by Hill & Range, a music publishing firm owned by his cousins Jean and Julian Aberbach that had long specialized in country music. There, Bienstock was given the task of finding songs for the company's most promising performer, Elvis Presley, supplying him with such songs by Jerry Leiber and Mike Stoller as "Don't" and "Jailhouse Rock", two of the King's earliest hit songs.

Originally not a fan of rock and roll, Bienstock developed an ear for the music that Presley would want. At his Brill Building "factory", he would get prospective songs from the songwriting teams of Burt Bacharach and Hal David, Doc Pomus and Mort Shuman, Sid Tepper and Roy C. Bennett, as well as from Leiber and Stoller, and take them to Memphis, Tennessee, where Presley would make his choices. Leiber recalled how "Mike and I would stay up all night and write" a song after Bienstock requested a tune for Presley that he said was needed by the next morning, and that needed to be delivered the next day regardless of quality. Bienstock would claim that "for the first 12 years of his career, Elvis wouldn’t look at a song unless I’d seen it already."

In the 1960s, Bienstock was charged with finding material for Presley's musical films, requiring about ten original songs for each movie, with as many as four films produced annually. With so many songwriters anxious to get their songs published and performed by Presley, Bienstock was successful in demanding that a substantial portion of royalties that the writer would normally receive would be given to Presley and Hill & Range, a practice that has been called "the Elvis Tax". But as Presley's popularity, as well as his record sales, plummeted as the decade wore on, this practice became less and less frequent. Accomplished songwriters were not willing to turn over publishing rights and the prospect of Elvis recording one of their songs became unappealing.

Bienstock purchased Belinda Music, Hill & Range's subsidiary in the UK, in 1966 and changed its name to Carlin Music to honor his daughter. This company became the basis for many further music publishing acquisitions, building the firm's catalog to 100,000 songs. He acquired Chappell Music from PolyGram in 1984 — marking his elevation from storeroom clerk to become the firm's primary shareholder and president three decades later — in a deal valued at $100 million, with Bienstock owning 15% of the company. At the time of the acquisition, Chappell was the world's largest music publisher, holding copyrights on 400,000 song titles and netting $30 million annually on gross revenues of $80 million. He sold the company to Warner Communications in 1988. Hudson Bay Music Company, a music publishing firm that he established together with Leiber and Stoller, remained in business until 1980.

Carlin America was formed in 1994, and controlled the rights to such music as the 1956 R&B song "Fever" that became a traditional pop standard when modified by Peggy Lee, "Dirty Deeds Done Dirt Cheap" by the Australian rock group AC/DC and Meat Loaf's "Paradise by the Dashboard Light". By the time of his death, Carlin America's catalog included Broadway theatre, classical, country music, pop classic standards.

Bienstock was the CEO and President of Carlin Music and Carlin America, and was on the board of directors of the American Society of Composers, Authors and Publishers (ASCAP).

== Death ==
Bienstock died at age 86 on September 20, 2009, at his home in Manhattan. He was survived by his wife, Miriam Bienstock, who had become a partner in Atlantic Records after acquiring an ownership stake from her first husband Herb Abramson. He was also survived by his daughter Caroline, the namesake of Carlin Music and Carlin America and his successor on the board of the National Music Publishers Association and who was COO of Carlin America at the time of Bienstock's death. A son, Robert Bienstock, also had been an executive in the family business and there were five grandchildren surviving him.

== Sources ==
- Emerson, Ken. Always Magic in the Air: The Bomp and Brilliance of the Brill Building Era.
