= Tkhine =

Personal prayers in Yiddish recited by women

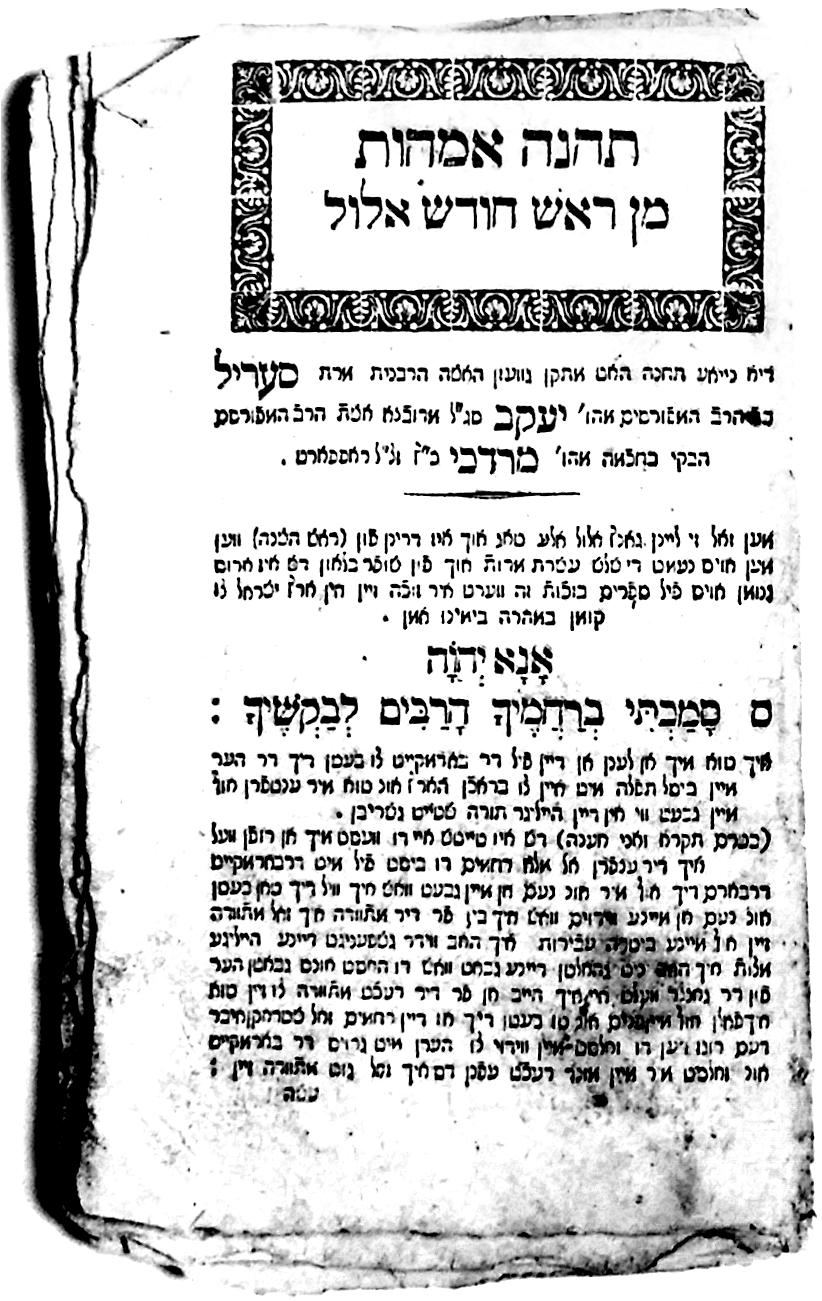
Tkhine of the Matriarchs for the New Moon of Elul by Seril bat Rabbi Yankev Segal of Dubno

Tkhines or teḥinot (Yiddish: תְּחִנּוֹת, lit. 'supplications', pronounced [tˈxɪnəs] or Hebrew: pronounced [tχiˈnot]) may refer to Yiddish prayers and devotions, usually personal and from a female viewpoint, or collections of such prayers. They were written for Ashkenazi Jewish women who, unlike the men of the time, typically could not read Hebrew, the language of the established synagogue prayer book. They were most popular from the 1600s to the early 1800s, with the first major collection of tkhines, the Seyder Tkhines, being printed in 1648. Unlike Hebrew prayers, tkhines dealt with issues specific to women. Despite being for women, it is thought that many tkhines were written by men and the authorship of most tkhines is often difficult to establish, due to multiple publications of the same tkhine and the use of pseudonyms.

== History ==
Women were excluded from much of Jewish religious life and were not required to perform the commandments Jewish law requires of men. Women were not obligated to attend synagogue services and their presence did not count towards the minyan required for public prayer, thus Jewish prayer, being of a communal nature, excluded women. Due to the religious requirement to separate men and women during prayer services, women sat in a designated section that was often physically separate from the men and were not permitted to take an active role in the service. Where men are required to pray three times a day during specific times, women are required solely to pray once a day, with no further specifications. The rationale for this difference is that men are obligated to fulfill time-bound commandments such as praying at certain times whereas women are exempt from time-bound commandments in general.

However, the biggest disparity between men's and women's religious roles under Jewish law was unequal access to education. Girls were often educated at home, while boys went to school. Nevertheless, there was a high level of literacy within the Jewish community for millennia. Girls learned the basic Hebrew reading but were often more fluent in Yiddish than in Hebrew, the language of Jewish prayer and traditional Jewish texts. Boys, on the other hand, were ideally expected to read and understand Hebrew fluently, although many of them did not. Additionally, only men were able to attend higher-level institutions called yeshivas that allowed them to study Jewish religious literature in a scholarly setting. Women had access to this formal education only if they were born into wealthy or scholarly families. Most women therefore only spoke the Jewish vernacular of Yiddish and were not able to access much of religious literature nor understand those prayers that were available to them. Thus, women would often recite a prayer without understanding it. This lack of kavone, or spiritual depth and sincerity, concerned some rabbis in the sixteenth century, who then took it upon themselves to translate some Hebrew prayers and the Bible into Yiddish for the benefit of women and "uneducated men." The first of these Yiddish prayers was printed in 1590 in Prague as a small pamphlet containing five prayers that were also printed in Hebrew. From this expansion of religious literature into the Yiddish language, other Yiddish prayers began to be published in collections, and both the prayers themselves and the collections which contained them came to be called tkhines. Tkhines are supplicatory prayers, written in Yiddish, that illuminate the lives of Jewish women and reflect what they might have been thinking as they performed religious duties and household tasks. There are two main categories of tkhines: those found in Western Europe in the 17th and 18th centuries, and those found in Easter Europe in the 18th and 19th centuries. Tkhines found in Western Europe were written by men for women, while those from Eastern Europe were mostly reworked by women.

=== The Seyder Tkhines ===
The earliest known and most widespread collection of tkhines are the Seyder Tkhines (Sequence of Supplications), which first appeared in print in Amsterdam in 1648. This collection, printed in Yiddish, provided women with a standard book of prayer that they could actually read and was prolifically printed and widely circulated across Europe. Based on the traditional Jewish prayer book, the Seyder Tkhines was composed in the voice of a female worshiper and contained prayers for daily and festival observances and women's religious obligations that were not provided by the standard synagogue prayer book. These prayers were divided into five sections of tkhines. The daily prayers existed as a way for women to fulfil their religious obligation to pray once a day and as an alternative to the weekly synagogue service. Two tkhines were to be said every day, one that was to be repeated each day of the week and another that was specific to each day of the week. During the 18th century, an expanded and revised version of the Seyder Tkhines was printed, entitled Seyder Tkhines u-bakoshes. This version added tkhines for domestic chores and personal subjects, such as asking for the safe return of a husband from a journey.

=== Modern history ===
By the middle of the 19th century, tkhines began to be integrated into Hasidic ("nusach sefard") prayer books. Collections of tkhines also began to be published by central and western European Jewish communities in French, German, and English language editions: Prières D'un Cœur Israélite (Prayers and Meditations for Every Situation and Occasion of Life; Jonas Ennery and Rabbi Arnaud Aron, Strasbourg: 1848), Prayers and Meditations for Every Situation and Occasion of Life (English translation by Hester Rothschild, 1855), and Stunden der Andacht (Fanny Neuda, 1855). By the end of the 19th century, Reform movement prayer books in Germany and the United States began integrating these supplemental prayers and meditations into their prayer books for egalitarian use.

The rise of Nazi Germany in the 1930s and the concurrent dwindling use of Yiddish by Jewry in the United States led to a decline in the publication of tkhines and their popularity, as the Nazi party murdered their authors and readers in Europe and the demand for Yiddish literature declined in America with the assimilation of Yiddish-speaking immigrants. However, tkhines continue to be published in America and are still popular within Hasidic sects, many of whom still retain Yiddish as their vernacular, and the Orthodox movement in America as a whole, although the latter use bilingual collections, as most are not fluent in Yiddish and must read in English.

== Content ==
In contrast to Hebrew prayers and devotions, tkhines were written specifically for women. Tkhines are also distinct because they were personal and meant to be an individual experience, as opposed to the communal experience of Hebrew prayer. They often addressed women's home life, issues related to marriage and childbirth, and her religious responsibilities, including a woman's mitzvot, which pertain to the preparation of challah, niddah, and hadlakah (lighting candles on the eve of the Sabbath and Holy Days).

Because they were writing in the vernacular as opposed to the holy language of Hebrew, authors felt more open to talking freely, and often spoke directly to God as a friend using the familiar form of 'you', something unheard of in the official and impersonal Hebrew liturgy. Authors also referenced Hebrew scripture and Aramaic texts, often naming Biblical characters, usually the matriarchs, and including stories from the Talmud or Midrash.

=== Example: A Pregnant Woman's Prayer ===
I pray unto You, Lord God of Israel, that You consider my prayer as You did that of Mother Channo, the prophetess who prayed for a son, the prophet Shmuel. May her z'chus [merit] stand me in good stead. May I, Your maidservant, who am with child (Your creation!), carry full term and give birth to a healthy child who will become a pious Jew and serve You heart and soul; one who will love Torah and be God-fearing according to Your holy will, a beautiful plant in the Jewish vineyard for the beauty of Israel [tiferes Yisroel]. Omayn.

— translated by Norman Tarnor, A Book of Jewish Women's Prayers: Translations from the Yiddish

== Authors ==
Although tkhines were almost always from a woman's point of view, many were written by men. Male authors would often write under a female pseudonym or the name of another popular female tkhine author, mainly for commercial benefit, making the true authorship of many tkhines unknown. In addition to this, many authors chose to sign off anonymously, using phrases such as "isha tsnue" (a modest woman) or "groyse tsdeykes" (a distinguished pious woman), and most tkhines didn't include an author's name at all. However, women were not only writers, but were also involved in both the creative and practical processes of publishing, working as printers, translators, editors, adaptors of existing literary works, copyists and even typesetters.

Due to a lack of rules and regulations as far as whose name was included on the final work, the author of the original tkhine may be left off in favor of the editor, printer, copyist, or typesetter, who would instead attach their own name to the work. Additionally, during the height of tkhine popularity, tkhines were reprinted multiple times to be included into different collections. Many times, the original name attached to the tkhine was either left off or reattributed to either the adaptor or the compiler of the collection, or someone else entirely. Thus, many tkhines are attributed to different authors depending on the collection.

Some authors indicated ownership through the tkhine itself by including an acrostic, where the first letter of each line or verse would spell out the author's name.

Many female tkhine authors were daughters of rabbis, as they were often the only women who had access to religious education, including the most well-known tkhine author, Sarah Bas Tovim, and two other known authors, Leah Horowitz and Leah Dreyzl.

== See also ==
- Jewish prayer
- Women in Judaism

== Books of translated tkhines ==
- Klirs, Tracy Guren. et al. The Merit of Our Mothers : a Bilingual Anthology of Jewish Women’s Prayers / Compiled and Introduced by Tracy Guren Klirs (1992) ISBN 0-87820-505-5
- Tarnor, Norman. A Book of Jewish Women’s Prayers : Translations from the Yiddish / Selected and with Commentary by Norman Tarnor (1995) ISBN 1-56821-298-4
- Kay, Devra. Seyder Tkhines : the Forgotten Book of Common Prayer for Jewish Women / Translated and Edited, with Commentary by Devra Kay. (2004) ISBN 0-8276-0773-3

== Bibliography ==
- Weissler, Chava. Voices of the Matriarchs : Listening to the Prayers of Early Modern Jewish Women / Chava Weissler. Boston, Mass: Beacon Press, 1998. Print. ISBN 0-8070-3616-1
- Kay, Devra. Seyder Tkhines : the Forgotten Book of Common Prayer for Jewish Women / Translated and Edited, with Commentary by Devra Kay. First edition. Philadelphia: The Jewish Publication Society, 2004. Print. ISBN 0-8276-0773-3
- Baumel-Schwartz, Judy Tydor. “My Grandmother’s Tkhine: Immigrant Jewish Women’s Lives, Identities and Prayers in Early Twentieth-Century America.” Nashim: A Journal of Jewish Women’s Studies & Gender Issues 31.1 (2017): 146–168. Web.
- Tarnor, Norman. A Book of Jewish Women’s Prayers : Translations from the Yiddish / Selected and with Commentary by Norman Tarnor. Northvale, N.J: Jason Aronson, 1995. Print. ISBN 1-56821-298-4
- Klirs, Tracy Guren. et al. The Merit of Our Mothers = [Bizkhus̀ Imohes̀] : a Bilingual Anthology of Jewish Women’s Prayers / Compiled and Introduced by Tracy Guren Klirs ; Translated by Tracy Guren Klirs, Ida Cohen Selavan, and Gella Schweid Fishman ; Annotated by Faedra Lazar Weiss and Barbara Selya. Cincinnati: Hebrew Union College Press, 1992. Print. ISBN 0-87820-505-5
