= Bolekhiv urban hromada =

Hromada in Ivano-Frankivsk Oblast, Ukraine

Bolekhiv urban hromada Болехівська міська громада
- Hromada
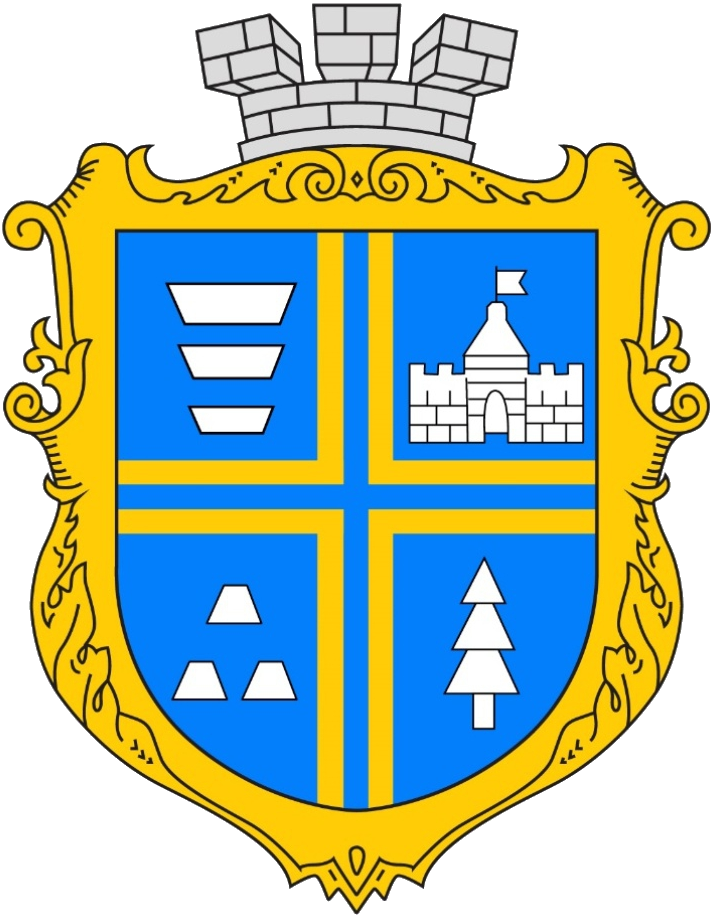
- Coat of arms
- Interactive map of Bolekhiv urban hromada
- Country: Ukraine
- Oblast: Ivano-Frankivsk Oblast
- Raion: Kalush Raion
- Admin. center: Bolekhiv

Area
  - Total: 2,442 km^{2} (943 sq mi)

Population (2020)
  - Total: 19,788
  - Density: 8.103/km^{2} (20.99/sq mi)
- CATOTTG code: UA26060010000037638
- Settlements: 11
- Cities: 1
- Villages: 10

Bolekhiv urban hromada (Ukrainian: Болехівська міська громада) is a hromada in Ukraine, in Kalush Raion of Ivano-Frankivsk Oblast. The administrative center is the city of Bolekhiv.

== Settlements ==
The hromada consists of 1 city (Bolekhiv) and 10 villages:

- Bubnyshche
- Bukovets
- Huziiv
- Zarichchia
- Kozakivka
- Mizhrichchia
- Polianytsia
- Sukil
- Taniava
- Tysiv
