= Song plugger =

Person employed to promote their songs

A song plugger or song demonstrator is an individual who promotes music to musicians, record labels, and customers. Song pluggers work for a music publishing company or operate independently. The function of the role has evolved as advances in music technology changed the music industry over the course of the 20th and 21st centuries.

== History ==
=== Sheet music plugging ===
In the late 19th and early 20th centuries, a song plugger was a vocalist or piano player employed in the early 20th century by department stores, music stores and song publishers to promote and help sell new sheet music. Prior to high-quality recorded music on phonograph records, sheet music sales were the sole measurement of a song's popularity. Music publisher Frank Harding has been credited with innovating the sales method. Typically, the pianist sat on the mezzanine level of a store. When patrons wanted to hear the music before buying, a clerk would send the music up to the demonstrator to be played.

Although the terms are often used interchangeably, those who worked in department and music stores were most often known as "song demonstrators", while those who worked directly for music publishers were called "song pluggers."

Notable musicians and composers who had worked as song pluggers included George Gershwin, Ron Roker, Jerome Kern, Irving Berlin, Lil Hardin Armstrong, Irving Mills, and Cole Porter. Film executive Harry Cohn had also been a song plugger.

=== Rise of recorded music ===
Later, the term was used to describe individuals who would pitch new music to performers, with The New York Times describing such examples as Freddy Bienstock performing a job in which he was "pitching new material to bandleaders and singers". In 1952, Life writer Ernest Havemann noted the following:

There are about 600 song-pluggers in the U.S.; they have their own union; they are powerful enough to bar all outsiders; and they command fees up to $35,000 a year [worth $414,430 today] plus unlimited expense accounts. Their job is to persuade the record companies to use songs, put out by their publishing houses, and the radio station disk jockeys to play the records."

== Modern day usage ==
Song pluggers remain a part of the music industry, serving a similar function to a professional manager by promoting new music to recording artists and record labels. They are often hired on retainer, and can work for a record label or operate independently.

== Bibliography ==
- Austin, Dave; Peterik, Jim; Lynn, Cathy (2010). Songwriting For Dummies. For Dummies. John Wiley & Sons. ISBN 978-0-470-89041-7.
- Field, Shelly (2010). Career Opportunities in the Music Industry. Infobase Publishing. ISBN 978-0-8160-7801-1 – via Google Books.
- Heldt, Guido (2013). Music and Levels of Narration in Film. Intellect Books. p. 147. ISBN 978-1-84150-625-8.
- Karp, Jonathan (2018). "The Roots of Jewish Concentration in the American Popular Music Business, 1890–1945". In Ross, Steven J.; Diner, Hasia R.; Ansell, Lisa (eds.). Doing Business in America: A Jewish History. The Jewish Role in American Life: An Annual Review. Purdue University Press. pp. 123–144. doi:10.2307/j.ctvh9w101. ISBN 978-1-55753-836-9. JSTOR j.ctvh9w101.
- Spring, Katherine (2013). Saying It With Songs: Popular Music and the Coming of Sound to Hollywood Cinema. OUP USA. ISBN 978-0-19-984222-3 – via Google Books.
- Thomas, Bob (1967). King Cohn: The Life and Times of Harry Cohn. G. P. Putnam's Sons. ISBN 978-1-893224-07-0 – via Internet Archive.
