= Hill & Range =

US music publishing company

Hill & Range (originally "Hill and Range Songs, Inc.") is a music publishing company which was particularly responsible for much of the country music produced in the 1950s and 1960s, and had control over the material recorded by Elvis Presley over that period. It is today part of Warner Chappell Music.

== Background ==
Hill and Range Songs, Inc. was incorporated in New York on December 9, 1944, by Austrian-born brothers Julian Aberbach and Jean Aberbach and their business partners Milton Blink and Gerald King, who owned Biltmore Music. It opened an office in Los Angeles in 1945. Aberbach's brother Jean joined in the early 1950s after working for Chappell Music, and thereafter the two shared control of the company, with Jean Aberbach being based in the Brill Building in New York City. After initially finding success representing Spade Cooley and Bob Wills, the company became active in the country music industry, particularly in Nashville, and at one point were reportedly responsible for three-quarters of all the music produced in Nashville. In 1955, the Aberbachs were responsible for setting up an unprecedented arrangement in which the publishing rights to all songs recorded by emerging star performer Elvis Presley were split 50:50 between the Hill & Range company and Presley and his management. The Aberbach brothers established their younger cousin, Freddy Bienstock, as head of Elvis Presley Music - in effect, a subsidiary of Hill & Range. It also employed writers (including Leiber and Stoller) to provide songs for Presley's films and albums. This arrangement effectively precluded Presley from recording material not licensed to Hill & Range from the mid-1950s through to the early 1970s.

Hill & Range gradually expanded to become the largest independent music publishing company, with worldwide interests. The company employed many of the top pop songwriters of the day, including Doc Pomus, Mort Shuman, and Phil Spector, as well as Leiber and Stoller. In 1964, it bought Progressive Music, the publishing company operated by Atlantic Records. In 1966, Hill and Range acquired Joy Music (formerly Santly-Joy and Santly-Joy-Select), a major publisher in the 1940s and the 1950s whose songs included Pennies from Heaven. In 1966, Pat Rolfe joined the company, and she would eventually work on Elvis Presley's publishing catalog, in addition to publishing for Johnny Cash, Marty Robbins, Eddy Arnold, and Bill Monroe. Rolfe became GM of the company in 1972 (and she remained with the company during and after its purchase by Chappell Music, eventually becoming vice president of Chappell before leaving in 1987).

In 1973, Julian Aberbach suffered an incapacitating heart attack, and in 1975 his brother Jean sold much of the business to Chappell Music, then a subsidiary of the PolyGram organization, although it retained control of the companies connected to Presley. It changed its name to Aberbach Enterprises, Limited on May 24, 1976. Chappell Music was in turn acquired in 1984 by Bienstock. Bienstock had earlier acquired Hill & Range's British subsidiary which he renamed Carlin Music. Chappell was acquired by Warner Music Group in 1987.
