= William Henry Husk =

English historian of music and critic

William Henry Husk (1814–1887) was an English historian of music and critic.

== Life ==
Husk was born in London on 4 November 1814. From 1833 to 1886 he was clerk to a firm of solicitors. As an amateur musician, taught by his godfather John Bernard Sale, he joined the Sacred Harmonic Society two years after its foundation in 1832; and in 1853 he was appointed honorary librarian. Husk held this post until the dissolution of the Society in 1882; its library went to the Royal College of Music.

Husk died, after a fortnight's illness, on 12 August 1887.

== Works ==
Husk published a Catalogue with a Preface (1862) of the library of the Sacred Harmonic Society; new edition "revised and greatly augmented", 1872. He wrote prefaces to the word-books of the oratorios performed at the Sacred Harmonic concerts. He was also author of Account of the Musical Celebrations on St. Cecilia's Day in the 16th, 17th, and 18th Centuries, to which is appended a Collection of Odes on St. Cecilia's Day, London, 1857. He edited, with notes, Songs of the Nativity; being Christmas Carols, Ancient and Modern, several of which appear for the first time in a Collection, London, 1868; and contributed to Grove's Dictionary of Music and Musicians.

== Notes ==
Attribution

This article incorporates text from a publication now in the public domain: Lee, Sidney, ed. (1891). "Husk, William Henry". Dictionary of National Biography. Vol. 28. London: Smith, Elder & Co.
