= Dov Ber Birkenthal =

18th century Hebrew memoirist

Dov Ber Birkenthal (1723–1805), also known as Ber of Bolechow, was a Hebrew writer from Bolekhiv whose memoirs provide an important insight into 18th century Jewish European life. He served as interpreter and advisor to the chief rabbi of Lemberg in his debate against Jacob Frank in 1759.

== Life ==
Birkenthal was born on March 13, 1723, in Bolechow, Galicia.

He was the son of a wine merchant. In addition to a traditional Jewish education, he was sent by his father to study Greek and Latin with the local priests, so that as an adult, he was fluent in Polish, German, Italian, Hebrew, Greek and Latin.

== Memoirs ==
The book Memoirs of Ber of Bolechow is a first-hand testimony about life in Bolochow in the 18th and early 19th centuries. In his book, Birkenthal writes about his life, politics and the troubles of his wine business, and makes scholarly references to verses from the Bible. Birkenthal also writes about riots, robberies, violence and murder committed by the Ukrainians from time to time. The book was edited in the 20th century by Mark Wischnitzer, in a bilingual edition, Yiddish and Hebrew. Wischnitzer added an introduction in which he told about the history of Bolochow and the life of the Jews there.
