= Dean Martin discography =

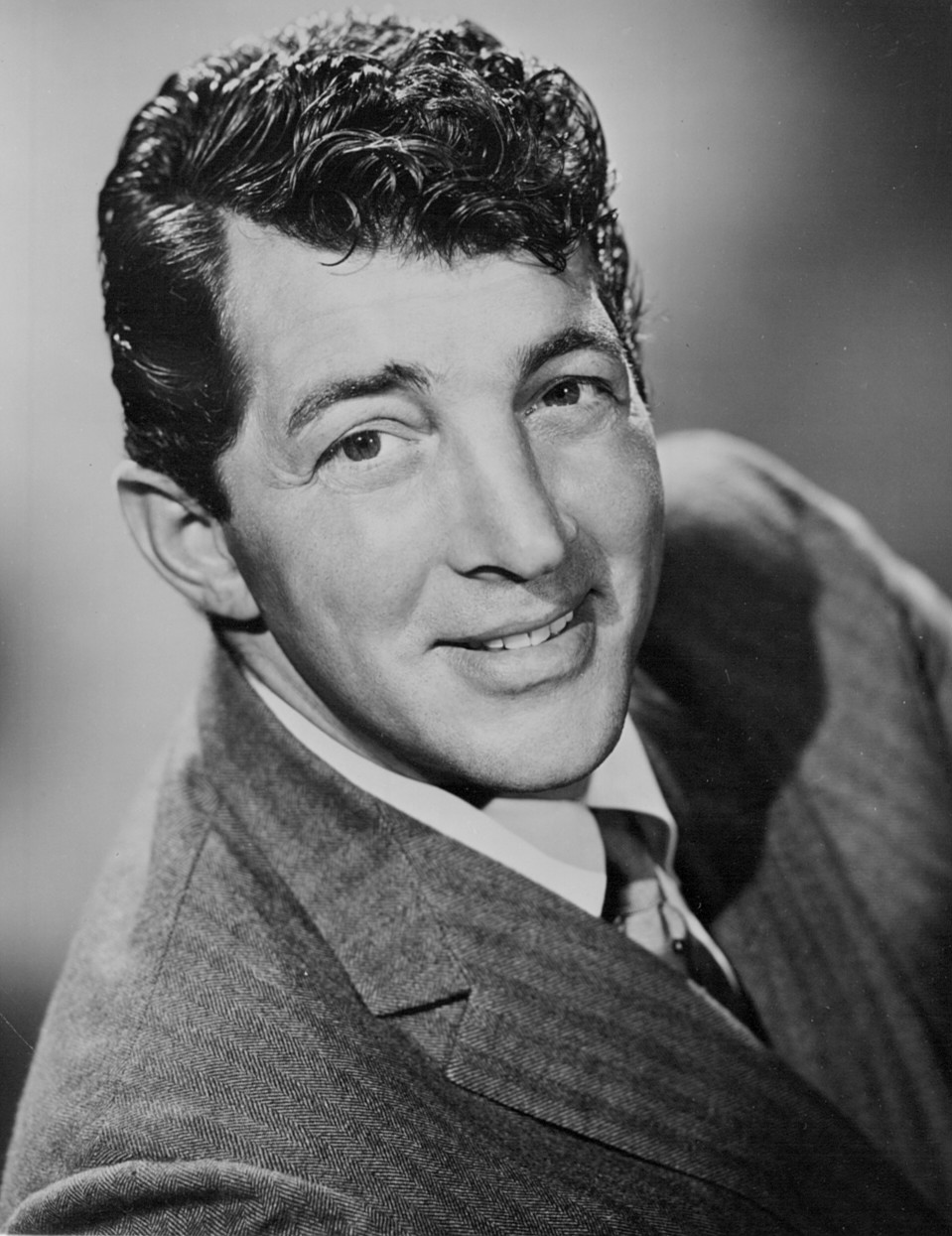
- Martin in 1957
- Studio albums: 37
- Extended plays: 1
- Soundtrack albums: 1
- Compilation albums: 20
- Singles: 108
- Box Sets: 5
- Retrospective live albums: 3
- Retrospective compilation albums: 14

This article contains a listing of Dean Martin's original singles, LPs, and compilations from his career.

== Overview ==
Martin recorded his first single, "Which Way Did My Heart Go" / "All of Me", for the small record company Diamond Records in July 1946. The majority of the singer's recordings were released by Capitol Records (1948–1961) and later on by Frank Sinatra's Reprise Records (1962–1974). Martin had many hit singles during his lifetime, two of which went to No. 1 on the pop charts—"Memories Are Made of This" in 1956 and "Everybody Loves Somebody" nearly a decade later. A close runner-up was "That's Amore", which stayed at No. 2. His other Top 10’s included "Powder Your Face with Sunshine" (No. 10), "Return to Me" (No. 4), "The Door Is Still Open to My Heart" (No. 6), and "I Will" (No. 10).

After "Volare" reached No. 12 in August 1958, Martin experienced a six-year period in his recording career without any significant activity. Instead, he focused on film acting. A song strongly associated with Martin, "Ain't That a Kick in the Head?," never charted when released as a single. His highest-charting single during that span was "On an Evening in Roma" which peaked at No. 59. It would take "Everybody Loves Somebody" to turn his chart decline around.

"Everybody Loves Somebody" also introduced Martin to the Easy Listening charts. From 1964 to 1969, he had great success there, as 20 of his singles reached the Top 10. The final year that the singer had any significant chart success was 1969, with "Gentle on My Mind", "I Take a Lot of Pride in What I Am", and "One Cup of Happiness" doing moderately well. In the United Kingdom "Gentle on My Mind" reached No. 2.

The crooner had two singles chart on Billboard's Country chart—"My First Country Song" (No. 35), featuring Conway Twitty, was the first in 1983. As early as 1959, Martin had expressed his love of country music ("My Rifle, My Pony, and Me"). Within a year of signing with Reprise, Martin had recorded his first country album, Country Style, released in January 1963. He continued to record country music prolifically until he retired, but country radio did not play his singles.

Martin released a total of 32 original studio albums throughout his career. His most critically acclaimed projects were released by Capitol Records in the late 1950s e.g., Sleep Warm (1959) and This Time I'm Swingin'! (1960). Nevertheless, the singer had no significant album chart success until he signed with Reprise Records in the early 1960s.

The Everybody Loves Somebody 1964 compilation album was Martin's best-selling album. It sat at No. 2, narrowly missing the top spot. The Dean Martin Christmas Album, released in 1966, became a permanent best-seller throughout the late 1960s and early 1970s, hitting No. 1 on Billboard's Christmas chart.

Other albums that made the Top 20 Pop Albums chart include Dream with Dean (No. 15), The Door Is Still Open to My Heart (No. 9), Dean Martin Hits Again (No. 13), (Remember Me) I'm the One Who Loves You (No. 12), Houston (No. 11), Welcome to My World (No. 20), and Gentle on My Mind (No. 14).

Martin virtually retired from the studio after November 1974, exacerbated by Reprise's decision to withhold the Once in a While project. The label believed Martin paying tribute to his influences would not sell well at the height of disco. The label finally reversed its decision four years later after embellishing the backing tracks with a more modern, disco-flavored rhythm section. Once in a While concluded the artist's association with Reprise.

His longtime producer, Jimmy Bowen, persuaded Martin to record one more album.The Nashville Sessions, released by Warner Brothers, became a moderate success in 1983. The crooner's recording career ended in July 1985, when he recorded the non-charting single, "L.A. Is My Home". Despite the singer's renown for his ease in front of audiences, no live albums were made available until after his death in 1995.

Demand for Martin's recordings continues to be significantly high in the new millennium. Capitol and Collectors' Choice Music re-released Martin's original studio albums. Bear Family Records, one of the world's leading reissue labels based in Germany, chronicled the singer's complete recording sessions in four lavish box sets. Capitol's 2004 compilation, Dino: The Essential Dean Martin, was certified platinum by the RIAA.

Two years later, Country singer Martina McBride overdubbed her vocals onto Martin's original version of "Baby It's Cold Outside" for Capitol's Forever Cool duets project. This resulted in a Top 40 Country/Top 10 Adult Contemporary hit which was Martin's first single activity since "My First Country Song" 23 years earlier. The album featured overdubbed duets with McBride, Kevin Spacey, Dave Koz, Chris Botti, Shelby Lynne, Big Bad Voodoo Daddy and more. A duet of "I'll Be Home for Christmas" with Scarlett Johansson was added to Martin's My Kind of Christmas CD.

Cool Then, Cool Now, a two-CD/book released on Hip-O Records in 2011, examined the artist's signature hits along with a significant dose of lesser-known recordings.

== Albums ==
=== Studio albums ===
List of albums, with selected chart positions and certifications (format: LP)
Title	Release date	Label	Notes	Peak chart positions			Certifications
Title	Release date	Label	Notes	US	US Country	UK	Certifications
Dean Martin Sings (recorded in 1952)	January 12, 1953	Capitol	Dean Martin's first studio album	—	—	—	
Swingin' Down Yonder (recorded in 1954–1955)	August 1, 1955	Capitol		—	—	—	
Pretty Baby	June 17, 1957	Capitol		—	—	—	
Sleep Warm (recorded in 1958)	March 2, 1959	Capitol	With an orchestra conducted by Frank Sinatra	—	—	—	
A Winter Romance	November 16, 1959	Capitol		61	—	—	BPI: Silver
This Time I'm Swingin'!	October 3, 1960	Capitol		—	—	18	
Dino: Italian Love Songs (recorded in 1961)	February 5, 1962	Capitol		73	—	—	
French Style	April 1962	Reprise	Martin's debut for Frank Sinatra's Reprise record label	—	—	—	
Cha Cha de Amor (recorded in 1961)	November 5, 1962	Capitol	Martin's final sessions for Capitol, recorded in December 1961.	—	—	—	
Dino Latino	November 27, 1962	Reprise		99	—	—	
Dean "Tex" Martin: Country Style	January 14, 1963	Reprise		109	—	—	
Dean "Tex" Martin Rides Again	June 10, 1963	Reprise		—	—	—	
Reprise Musical Repertory Theatre	1963	Reprise	A set of four albums, including three albums with Dean; w/ Bing Crosby, Frank Sinatra, Rosemary Clooney, Sammy Davis Jr., Debbie Reynolds and other artists	—	—	—	
Robin and the 7 Hoods	June 1964	Reprise	w/ Bing Crosby, Frank Sinatra, Sammy Davis Jr. and Peter Falk	—	—	—	
Dream with Dean	August 4, 1964	Reprise		15	—	—	RIAA: Gold
The Door Is Still Open to My Heart	October 3, 1964	Reprise	"I'm Gonna Change Everything", "The Middle of the Night Is My Cryin' Time", and "My Sugar's Gone" were lifted from the Dean "Tex" Martin Rides Again album.	9	—	—	RIAA: Gold
Dean Martin Hits Again	February 2, 1965	Reprise	"You're Nobody till Somebody Loves You" was lifted from Martin's previous LP, The Door Is Still Open to My Heart.	13	—	—	RIAA: Gold
(Remember Me) I'm the One Who Loves You	August 2, 1965	Reprise		12	—	—	RIAA: Gold
Houston	November 1965	Reprise		11	—	—	RIAA: Gold
Somewhere There's a Someone	February 1966	Reprise		50	—	—	RIAA: Gold
Dean Martin Sings Songs from "The Silencers"	April 1966	Reprise		108	—	—	
The Hit Sound of Dean Martin	July 26, 1966	Reprise	"Any Time" and "Ain't Gonna Try Anymore" were lifted from Martin's 1963 LP, Dean "Tex" Martin: Country Style.	50	—	—	
The Dean Martin Christmas Album	October 11, 1966	Reprise	As Billboard changed its policy for Christmas albums in 1963, this album was ineligible for the main pop chart. However, on the seasonal Christmas chart, the album reached No. 1.	18	—	—	RIAA: Gold
The Dean Martin TV Show (UK: At Ease with Dean)	November 7, 1966	Reprise		34	—	35	
Happiness Is Dean Martin	May 2, 1967	Reprise	The album contains a stripped down band arrangement with less emphasis placed on vocal choruses and orchestration.	46	—	—	
Welcome to My World (recorded in 1964–1967)	August 15, 1967	Reprise	"In the Chapel in the Moonlight" was lifted from Dean Martin Hits Again, while Welcome to My World originally appeared on another 1965 LP, (Remember Me) I'm the One Who Loves You.	20	—	39	RIAA: Gold
Gentle on My Mind	December 17, 1968	Reprise		14	—	9	RIAA: Gold
I Take a Lot of Pride in What I Am	August 7, 1969	Reprise		90	—	—	
My Woman My Woman My Wife	August 25, 1970	Reprise		97	—	—	
For the Good Times (recorded in 1970)	February 2, 1971	Reprise		113	41	—	
Dino (recorded in 1971)	January 18, 1972	Reprise		117	—	—	
Sittin' on Top of the World	May 29, 1973	Reprise	Martin's first studio album to miss the charts entirely since Dean "Tex" Martin Rides Again 10 years earlier.	—	—	—	
You're the Best Thing That Ever Happened to Me	December 14, 1973	Reprise		—	—	—	
Once in a While (recorded in 1974)	October 20, 1978	Reprise	Recorded in November 1974, the album was withheld for four years. Although partial rhythm tracks, strings, and chorus vocals were overdubbed in Nashville by producer Jimmy Bowen as a last ditch effort to contemporize the songs, Once in a While made no sales impact, becoming Martin's final product for Reprise.	—	—	—	
The Nashville Sessions	June 15, 1983	Warner Bros. Records	Martin's final recording sessions, except for the rare 1985 single, "L.A. Is My Home".	—	49	—	
"—" denotes releases that did not chart or were not released in that territory.

=== Posthumous live albums ===
List of albums, with selected chart positions and certifications (format: CD, digital download)
Title	Release Date	Label	Notes	Peak chart positions		Certifications
Title	Release Date	Label	Notes	US	UK	Certifications
At Villa Venice, Chicago (Live 1962) (recorded in 1962)	1993	Jazz Hour Compact Classics	Recorded live between November 26 - December 2, 1962, in The Villa Venice Night Club, Chicago, Illinois. Released in 2 volumes.	—	—	
Live at the Sands Hotel (recorded in 1964)	March 27, 2001	Bianco Records	Recorded live on February 8, 1964, in Las Vegas. Perhaps the most famous Martin live recording, this has been available for many years on numerous bootlegs, so the original release date/label is questionable.	—	—	
Live from Las Vegas (recorded in 1967)	April 26, 2005	Capitol Records	Recorded live on April 4, 1967, at the Sands Hotel in Las Vegas	—	—	
Live from Lake Tahoe 1962 (recorded in 1962)	June 7, 2005	Capitol Records	Recorded live on July 27, 1962, at the Cal-Neva Lodge in Lake Tahoe. Only seven songs from the show were originally issued as part of a special "platinum edition" of Dino: The Essential Dean Martin. The complete concert was released in its entirety on the 2012 box set, Collected Cool.	—	—	
"—" denotes releases that did not chart or were not released in that territory.

=== Compilation albums ===
List of albums, with selected chart positions and certifications (format: LP)
Title	Release Date	Label	Notes	Peak chart positions			Certifications
Title	Release Date	Label	Notes	US	AUS	UK	Certifications
This Is Dean Martin!	August 25, 1958	Capitol (Starline Series)	Non-album singles compilation spanning 1952–1958	—	—	—	
Martin Magic	November, 1958	Capitol	Non-album singles compilation	—	—	—	
Everybody Loves Somebody	August 4, 1964	Reprise	When the title song became a smash hit, Reprise assembled this LP from B-sides and previously released album cuts recorded between February 1962 and April 1964. It was released on the same day as the Dream with Dean studio album.	2	—	—	RIAA: Gold
Hey, Brother, Pour the Wine	November 30, 1964	Capitol	Non-album singles compilation recorded between 1951 and 1960	—	—	—	
The Lush Years	October 11, 1965	Tower, a subsidiary of Capitol	Non-album singles compilation	—	—	—	
The Summit (w/ Bing Crosby, Frank Sinatra and Sammy Davis Jr.)	1966	Reprise	Non-album singles compilation	—	—	—	
Relaxin'	March 7, 1966	Tower (Capitol)	Non-album singles compilation	—	—	—	
Somewhere There's a Someone	March 8, 1966	Reprise	Only the title cut and its B-side, "That Old Clock On The Wall," are exclusive to the album. The remaining 10 selections originally appeared on Martin's two country-themed albums from 1963, Dean "Tex" Martin: Country Style and Dean "Tex" Martin Rides Again.	40	—	—	RIAA: Gold
Happy in Love	August 2, 1966	Tower (Capitol)		—	—	—	
The Best of Dean Martin	October 3, 1966	Capitol		95	—	—	RIAA: Platinum
You Can't Love 'Em All	1967	Pickwick		—	—	—	
Dino – Like Never Before	August 7, 1967	Tower (Capitol)		—	—	—	
Deluxe	1967	Pickwick		—	—	—	
Dean Martin's Greatest Hits! Vol. 1	May 13, 1968	Reprise		26	—	40	RIAA: Gold
Dean Martin's Greatest Hits! Volume 2	August 13, 1968	Reprise		83	—	—	RIAA: Gold
I Can't Give You Anything but Love	1968	Pickwick		—	—	—	
On the Sunny Side	1968	Reprise	Format: 2 LP	—	—	—	
The Best of Dean Martin, Vol. 2	January 13, 1969	Capitol		145	—	—	
Young & Foolish	1969	Pickwick		—	—	—	
Retrospective compilation albums
(format: CD, cassette)
The Capitol Collector's Series	October 25, 1989	Capitol		—	—	—	RIAA: Gold
All-Time Greatest Hits	November 27, 1990	Curb		—	—	—	RIAA: Gold
Greatest Hits: King of Cool	June 2, 1998	Capitol	The first Martin album to combine a sampling of hits from Capitol and Reprise.	—	9	—	RIAA: Gold
Making Spirits Bright	November 2, 1998	Capitol	The first Martin album to combine a sampling of holiday and winter songs from Capitol and Reprise.	—	—	—	
(format: CD)
Hurtin' Country Songs	September 14, 1999	Capitol	Liner notes penned by Willie Nelson.	—	—	—	
(format: CD, digital download)
Swingin' with Dino	September 24, 2002		Also released as LP	—	—	—	
Dino: The Essential Dean Martin	June 1, 2004	Capitol	Martin's best album peak on the pop charts since Gentle on My Mind charted in the Top 20 in 1969.	28	29	25	RIAA: Platinum
Christmas with Dino	September 21, 2004	Capitol		69	—	—	
Forever Cool	August 14, 2007	Capitol	An album featuring both contemporary backing tracks and overdubbed "duet" vocals from various artists.	39	27	—	
Amore	January 27, 2009	Capitol		—	—	—	
My Kind of Christmas	October 6, 2009	Hip-O	"Winter Wonderland" features a newly recorded pop/rock rhythm track.	152	—	—	
Essential Love Songs	January 26, 2010	Capitol		—	—	—	
Cool Then, Cool Now	June 7, 2011	Hip-O	Includes two career-spanning discs featuring 28 songs and a hardcover book of rare family photos	—	—	—	
Icon	March 6, 2012	Hip-O		—	—	—	
Icon, Vol. 2	July 30, 2013	Hip-O		—	—	—	
Greatest Hits	October 22, 2013	Capitol		—	—	—	
Dino's Christmas	November 12, 2013	Capitol	Reissued in 2014 with updated branding as ICON: Christmas by Capitol in conjunction with Universal Music Special Markets.	54	—	—	
Playlist: The Very Best of Dean Martin	January 21, 2014	Legacy		—	—	—	
(format: vinyl, digital download)
Classic Christmas	October 30, 2026	Legacy/Iconic		—	—	—	
"—" denotes releases that did not chart or were not released in that territory.

=== Soundtrack albums ===
List of soundtrack albums, with selected details
Title	Details
Bells Are Ringing (with Judy Holliday)	Release date: 1960; Label: Capitol; Formats: LP

=== Box sets ===
List of box sets, with selected details (format: CD)
Title	Release Date	Label	Notes
Memories Are Made of This	December 24, 1997	Bear Family	Curated by Bear Family—a German reissue label—is the first volume of a career-encompassing project chronicling Martin's complete discography recorded between 1946 and 1955 on Diamond, Apollo, Embassy, and Capitol. Missing Rock-a-Bye Your Baby with a Dixie Melody (1950)
Return to Me	May 20, 1998	Bear Family	The second volume of a career-encompassing project chronicling Martin's complete discography recorded between 1956 and 1961 on Capitol.
Everybody Loves Somebody: The Reprise Years 1962–1966	January 21, 2002	Bear Family	The third volume of a career-encompassing project chronicling Martin's complete discography recorded during his early tenure on Reprise.
Lay Some Happiness on Me: The Reprise Years and More 1966–1985	January 21, 2002	Bear Family	The fourth and final volume of a career-encompassing project chronicling Martin's complete discography recorded between 1966 and 1985 on Reprise, Warner Bros., and MCA.
Collected Cool	June 12, 2012	Hip-O	The first career-spanning box set released in the USA chronicling Martin's extensive oeuvre. Featuring three CDs [i.e. the third contains the complete July 27, 1962, concert at the Cal-Neva Lodge in Lake Tahoe] and one DVD of a rare June 9, 1983, concert special recorded at London's Apollo Victoria Theatre for the Showtime network.

== Extended plays ==
List of extended plays, with selected details and chart positions
Title	Details	Peak chart positions
Title	Details	US
Dean Martin	Release date: December 13, 1954; Label: Capitol; Note: Contains "Let Me Go Lover", "Naughty Lady of Shady Lane", "Mambo Italiano", and "That's All I Want From You"	10

== Singles ==
=== 1940s ===
Year	Single	Chart Position	Label
Year	Single	US	Label
1946	"Which Way Did My Heart Go?" / "All of Me"	—	Diamond
1946	"I Got the Sun in the Morning" / "The Sweetheart of Sigma Chi"	—	Diamond
1947	"One Foot in Heaven" / "The Night Is Young and You're So Beautiful"	—	Embassy
1947	"Oh Marie" / "Walking My Baby Back Home"	—	Apollo
1948	"Santa Lucia" / "Hold Me"	—	Apollo
1948	"That Certain Party" (With Jerry Lewis) (B-side to The Money Song)	22	Capitol
1948	"Once In Love With Amy"	—	Capitol
1949	"Powder Your Face with Sunshine (Smile, Smile, Smile)"	10	Capitol
1949	"You Was" (With Peggy Lee)	—	Capitol
1949	"Dreamy Old New England Moon" (With The Martingales and Paul Weston And His Orchestra)	—	Capitol
1949	"My Own, My Only, My All"	—	Capitol
1949	"Vieni Su" (With Paul Weston And His Orchestra)	—	Capitol
1949	"Johnny Get Your Girl"	—	Capitol

=== 1950s ===
Year	Single	Chart positions							Label	Certifications	Album
Year	Single	US	US CB	CAN	NET	NO	UK	AUS	Label	Certifications	Album
1950	"I'll Always Love You"	11	—	—	—	—	—	—	Capitol		Happy in Love (Compilation rel. 8/2/66 via Tower Records)
1951	"Ma Come Bali (Bella Bimba)"	—	—	—	—	—	—	8	Capitol		—
1951	"If"	14	—	—	—	—	—	—	Capitol		You Can't Love 'Em All (Pickwick Budget LP)
1952	"You Belong to Me"	12	—	—	—	—	—	1	Capitol		—
1953	"Love Me, Love Me"	25	—	—	—	—	—	—	Capitol		Hey, Brother, Pour the Wine
1953	"Kiss"	—	—	—	—	—	5	—	Capitol		—
1953	"That's Amore"	2	2	—	—	—	2	1	Capitol	RIAA: Platinum	Sunny Italy (EP rel. 12/7/53) & Dean Martin Sings (12-inch LP version)
1954	"I'd Cry Like a Baby"	21	—	—	—	—	—	—	Capitol		Single only
1954	"Hey Brother Pour the Wine" (B-side of "I'd Cry Like a Baby")	—	30	—	—	—	—	—	Capitol		Hey, Brother, Pour the Wine
1954	"Sway"	15	13	—	—	—	6	1	Capitol	RIAA: Gold	Hey, Brother, Pour the Wine
1954	"Money Burns a Hole in My Pocket" (B-side of "Sway")	23	—	—	—	—	—	—	Capitol		Living It Up (EP rel. 6/7/54)
1954	"How Do You Speak to an Angel"	—	—	—	—	—	15	—	Capitol		Living It Up (EP rel. 6/7/54)
1954	"That's What I Like"	—	29	—	—	—	—	—	Capitol		—
1954	"The Peddler Man" (B-side of "That's What I Like")	—	33	—	—	—	—	—	Capitol		—
1954	"Try Again"	—	36	—	—	—	—	—	Capitol		—
1954	"One More Time" (B-side of "Try Again")	—	44	—	—	—	—	—	Capitol		—
1955	"The Naughty Lady of Shady Lane" (UK & AU Single only)	—	—	—	—	—	5	1	Capitol		Dean Martin (EP rel. December 13, 1954)
1955	"Mambo Italiano" (UK & AU Single only)	—	—	—	—	—	14	2	Capitol		Dean Martin (EP rel. December 13, 1954)
1955	"Let Me Go, Lover!" (UK & AU Single only)	—	—	—	—	—	3	1	Capitol		Dean Martin (EP rel. December 13, 1954)
1955	"That's All I Want from You" (UK & AU Single only)	—	—	—	—	—	—	4	Capitol		Dean Martin (EP rel. December 13, 1954)
1955	"Young and Foolish"	—	34	—	—	—	20	—	Capitol		—
1955	"Under the Bridges of Paris" (B-side of "Young and Foolish")	—	—	—	—	—	6	—	Capitol		—
1955	"Open Up the Doghouse" (with Nat King Cole)	—	22	—	—	—	—	19	Capitol		—
1955	"Chee Chee-Oo Chee (Sang the Little Bird)"	—	—	—	—	—	—	8	Capitol		—
1955	"Memories Are Made of This"	1	1	—	2	—	1	1	Capitol		Memories Are Made of This (EP rel. December 12, 1955) & Hey, Brother, Pour the Wine
1955	"Relax-ay-Voo"	—	—	—	—	—	—	16	Capitol		Single only
1956	"Innamorata"	27	17	—	—	—	21	20	Capitol		Artists and Models (EP rel. December 26, 1955)
1956	"Standing on the Corner"	22	—	—	—	—	—	—	Capitol		Hey, Brother, Pour the Wine
1956	"Watching the World Go By" (B-side of "Standing on the Corner")	83	—	—	—	—	—	—	Capitol		—
1956	"Lady with the Big Umbrella"	—	—	—	—	—	—	21	Capitol		—
1956	"I'm Gonna Steal You Away"	—	—	—	—	—	—	—	Capitol		—
1956	"Mississippi Dreamboat"	—	—	—	—	—	—	—	Capitol		—
1956	"The Look"	—	—	—	—	—	—	—	Capitol		This Is Dean Martin!
1956	"I Know I Can't Forget"	—	—	—	—	—	—	—	Capitol		This Is Dean Martin!
1957	"The Man Who Plays the Mandolino"	—	—	—	—	—	21	—	Capitol		Hey, Brother, Pour the Wine
1957	"Only Trust Your Heart"	—	—	—	—	—	—	—	Capitol		Ten Thousand Bedrooms (EP)
1957	"I Never Had a Chance"	—	—	—	—	—	—	—	Capitol		The Lush Years
1957	"Write to Me from Naples"	—	—	—	—	—	—	—	Capitol		This Is Dean Martin!
1957	"Promise Her Anything"	—	—	—	—	—	—	—	Capitol		This Is Dean Martin!
1957	"Good Mornin' Life"	—	—	—	—	—	—	—	Capitol		—
1958	"Return to Me"	4	3	5	1	8	2	3	Capitol		Return to Me (EP rel. April 21, 1958) & This Is Dean Martin! LP
1958	"Angel Baby"	30	38	23	—	—	—	57	Capitol		Volare (EP rel. 8/11/58) & This Is Dean Martin! LP
1958	"Volare"	12	1	27	—	3	2	1	Capitol	RIAA: Gold	Volare (EP rel. 8/11/58) & This Is Dean Martin! LP
1958	"The Magician"	—	—	—	—	—	—	92	Capitol		—
1958	"Once Upon a Time" (B-side of "The Magician")	—	94	40	—	—	—	—	Capitol		—
1959	"You Were Made for Love"	—	—	—	—	—	—	—	Capitol		Happy in Love
1959	"It Takes So long" (B-side of "You Were Made For Love")	—	80	—	—	—	—	—	Capitol		The Lush Years
1959	"Rio Bravo"	—	—	—	—	—	—	—	Capitol		The Lush Years
1959	"On an Evening in Roma" (Single Version)	59	36	31	—	—	—	26	Capitol		Single only: (a 1961 version is on Dino: Italian Love Songs)
1959	"I Ain't Gonna Lead This Life No More"	—	—	—	—	—	—	—	Capitol		You Can't Love 'Em All (Pickwick Budget LP)
"—" denotes releases that did not chart or were not released in that territory.

=== 1960s ===
Year	Single	Chart positions									Label	Certifications	Album
Year	Single	US	US CB	US A/C	CAN	NET	NO	SWE	UK	AUS	Label	Certifications	Album
1960	"Love Me, My Love"	107	110	—	—	—	—	—	—	—	Capitol		
1960	"Who Was That Lady?" (B-side of "Love Me, My Love")	—	—	—	—	—	—	—	—	—	Capitol		
1960	"Professor! Professor!"	—	—	—	—	—	—	—	—	—	Capitol		
1960	"Just in Time"	—	—	—	—	—	—	—	—	—	Capitol		
1960	"Ain't That a Kick in the Head?"	—	—	—	—	—	—	—	—	—	Capitol		
1960	"Sogni d'oro"	—	—	—	—	—	—	—	—	—	Capitol		
1961	"Sparklin' Eyes"	—	98	—	—	—	—	—	—	—	Capitol		
1961	"All in a Night's Work (Movie Theme Song)	—	—	—	—	—	—	—	—	—	Capitol		
1961	"Giuggiola"	—	—	—	—	—	—	—	—	—	Capitol		
1962	"Tik-A-Tee, Tik-A-Tay"	—	—	—	—	—	—	—	—	—	Reprise		
1962	"C'est si bon"	—	—	—	—	—	—	—	—	—	Reprise		French Style
1962	"Baby-O"	—	—	—	—	—	—	—	—	—	Reprise		Everybody Loves Somebody
1962	"Who's Got the Action?"	—	—	—	—	—	—	—	—	—	Reprise		—
1962	"From the Bottom of My Heart"	91	93	—	—	—	—	—	—	—	Reprise		—
1962	"Sam's Song" (with Sammy Davis, Jr.; B-side of "Me and My Shadow," a duet between Davis and Frank Sinatra)	94	—	—	—	—	—	—	—	—	Reprise		The Sammy Davis, Jr. Show (February 1966 LP)
1962	"Senza Fine"	—	—	—	—	—	—	—	—	—	Reprise		—
1963	"Face in a Crowd"	128	136	—	—	—	—	—	—	—	Reprise		Dean "Tex" Martin: Country Style
1963	"My Sugar's Gone"	—	—	—	—	—	—	—	—	—	Reprise		Dean "Tex" Martin Rides Again
1963	"Via Veneto"	—	—	—	—	—	—	—	—	—	Reprise		—
1963	"Fugue for Tinhorns" (with Bing Crosby & Frank Sinatra)	—	—	—	—	—	—	—	—	—	Reprise		—
1964	"La Giostra" (The Merry-Go-Round)	—	—	—	—	—	—	—	—	—	Reprise		—
1964	"Everybody Loves Somebody" (Single Version) (Note: According to the RIAA, "Everybody Loves Somebody" has been certified platinum for sales of 1,000,000. It is the only Martin single to receive any RIAA certification.)	1	1	1	8 (Note: "Everybody Loves Somebody" peaked at No. 3 in the CHUM charts.)	—	10	19	11	12	Reprise	RIAA: Platinum	Everybody Loves Somebody
1964	"The Door Is Still Open to My Heart"	6	8	1	20 (Note: "The Door Is Still Open To My Heart" peaked at No.15 in the CHUM charts.)	—	—	—	42	34	Reprise		The Door Is Still Open to My Heart
1964	"Every Minute Every Hour" (B-side of "The Door Is Still Open to My Heart")	123	140	—	—	—	—	—	—	—	Reprise		The Door Is Still Open to My Heart
1964	"You're Nobody till Somebody Loves You"	25	26	1	(Note: "You're Nobody Till Somebody Loves You" peaked at No.28 in the CHUM charts.)	—	—	—	—	78	Reprise	RIAA: Gold	The Door Is Still Open to My Heart
1964	"You'll Always Be the One I Love" (B-side of "You're Nobody till Somebody Loves You")	64	79	13	—	—	—	—	—	—	Reprise		Dean Martin Hits Again
1965	"Send Me the Pillow You Dream On"	22	20	5	16 (Note: "Send Me The Pillow You Dream On" peaked at No.34 in the CHUM charts)	29	—	—	—	40	Reprise		Dean Martin Hits Again
1965	"I'll Be Seeing You" (B-side of "Send Me the Pillow You Dream On")	—	148	—	—	—	—	—	—	—	Reprise		Dean Martin Hits Again
1965	"(Remember Me) I'm the One Who Loves You"	32	35	7	14 (Note: "(Remember Me) I'm The One Who Loves You" peaked at No.32 in the CHUM charts.)	—	—	—	—	37	Reprise		(Remember Me) I'm the One Who Loves You
1965	"Houston"	21	24	2	(Note: "Houston" peaked at No.11 in the CHUM chart.)	—	—	—	—	91	Reprise		Houston
1965	"Bumming Around"(B-side of "Houston")	—	141	—	—	—	—	—	—	—	Reprise		(Remember Me) I'm the One Who Loves You
1965	"I Will"	10	11	3	11 (Note: "I Will" peaked at No.5 in the CHUM charts.)	—	—	—	—	29	Reprise		Houston
1965	"You're the Reason I'm in Love"(B-side of "I Will")	—	136	—	—	—	—	—	—	—	Reprise		Houston
1966	"Somewhere There's a Someone"	32	34	2	44 (Note: "Somewhere There's A Someone" peaked at No.9 in the Adult Contemporary chart and No.17 in the CHUM chart.)	—	—	—	—	61	Reprise		Somewhere There's a Someone
1966	"Come Running Back"	35	40	4	74 (Note: "Come Running Back" peaked at No.16 in the CHUM chart.)	—	—	—	—	35	Reprise		The Hit Sound of Dean Martin
1966	"Bouquet of Roses"(B-side of "Come Running Back")	—	116	—	—	—	—	—	—	—	Reprise		Somewhere There's a Someone
1966	"A Million and One"	41	45	4	64 (Note: "A Million To One" peaked at No.23 in the CHUM chart.)	—	—	—	—	82	Reprise		The Hit Sound of Dean Martin
1966	"Nobody's Baby Again"	60	52	6	48 (Note: "Nobody’s Baby Again" peaked at No.17 in the CHUM chart.)	—	—	—	—	—	Reprise		Happiness Is Dean Martin
1966	"It Just Happened That Way" [B-side of "Nobody's Baby Again"]	—	89	—	—	—	—	—	—	—	Reprise		Happiness Is Dean Martin
1966	"(Open Up the Door) Let the Good Times In"	55	55	7	51	—	—	—	—	72	Reprise		Happiness Is Dean Martin
1966	"Blue Christmas"	—	—	—	—	—	—	—	—	—	Reprise		The Dean Martin Christmas Album
1967	"Lay Some Happiness on Me"	55	55	6	44	—	—	—	—	50	Reprise		Happiness Is Dean Martin
1967	"In the Chapel in the Moonlight" (Recorded December 22, 1964)	25	30	1	24 (Note: "Chapel In The Moonlight" peaked at No.13 in the CHUM chart.)	46	—	—	—	4	Reprise		Dean Martin Hits Again
1967	"Little Ole Wine Drinker, Me"	38	48	5	32	59	—	—	—	5	Reprise		Welcome to My World
1967	"Things" (with Nancy Sinatra) (Note: Note: "Things" was originally recorded by Martin on December 13, 1962. Nancy Sinatra overdubbed her vocal to the existing rhythm track five years later on September 20, 1967)	—	—	—	—	—	1	—	—	61	Reprise		Movin' with Nancy
1967	"In the Misty Moonlight" (Recorded August 24, 1964)	46	62	1	66	—	—	—	—	25	Reprise		The Door Is Still Open to My Heart
1968	"You've Still Got a Place in My Heart" (Overdubbed Single Version)	60	44	7	44	—	—	—	—	74	Reprise		The original version is on Happiness Is Dean Martin.
1968	"April Again"	105	67	9	80	—	—	—	—	96	Reprise		Gentle on My Mind
1968	"That Old Time Feelin'" [B-side of "April Again"]	104	—	19	—	—	—	—	—	—	Reprise		Gentle on My Mind
1968	"5 Card Stud"	107	—	—	—	—	—	—	—	—	Reprise		—
1968	"Not Enough Indians"	43	44	4	49	—	—	—	—	17	Reprise		Gentle on My Mind
1969	"Gentle on My Mind"	103	93	9	—	—	—	—	2	47	Reprise		Gentle on My Mind
1969	"I Take a Lot of Pride in What I Am"	75	71	15	62 (Note: "I Take A Lot Of Pride In What I Am" peaked at No.3 in the Adult Contemporary Chart.)	—	—	—	—	88	Reprise		I Take a Lot of Pride in What I Am
1969	"One Cup of Happiness (and One Piece of Mind)"	107	82	15	62	—	—	—	—	—	Reprise		I Take a Lot of Pride in What I Am
"—" denotes releases that did not chart or were not released in that territory.

=== 1970s ===
Year	Single	Chart positions						Label	Album
Year	Single	US	US CB	US A/C	CAN	UK	AUS	Label	Album
1970	"Come on Down"	—	121	—	—	—	—	Reprise	—
1970	"For the Love of a Woman"	123	122	—	—	—	—	Reprise	—
1970	"My Woman, My Woman, My Wife"	110	97	—	—	—	92	Reprise	My Woman, My Woman, My Wife
1970	"Detroit City"	101	99	36	93	—	—	Reprise	My Woman, My Woman, My Wife
1970	"Georgia Sunshine"	118	117	—	—	—	—	Reprise	For the Good Times
1971	"She's a Little Bit Country"	—	121	36	—	—	—	Reprise	For the Good Times
1971	"What's Yesterday"	—	115	—	—	—	—	Reprise	Dino
1972	"Guess Who"	—	—	92	—	—	—	Reprise	Dino
1973	"Amor Mio"	—	—	73	—	—	—	Reprise	You're the Best Thing That Ever Happened to Me
1973	"Get on with Your Livin'"	108	—	50	(Note: "Get On With Your Livin’" peaked at No.78 in the Adult Contemporary Chart.)	—	—	Reprise	You're the Best Thing That Ever Happened to Me
1973	"You're the Best Thing That Ever Happened to Me"	—	—	86	—	—	—	Reprise	You're the Best Thing That Ever Happened to Me
1975	"Memories Are Made Of This" (Reissue)	—	—	—	—	56	—	Capitol	Memories Are Made Of This (UK compilation)

=== 1980s ===
Year	Single	Chart positions	Album
Year	Single	US Country	Album
1983	"My First Country Song" (with Conway Twitty)	35	The Nashville Sessions
1983	"Since I Met You Baby"	58	The Nashville Sessions
1985	"L.A. Is My Home" [Recorded in July 1985, Martin's final single released during his lifetime].	30	—

=== Posthumous releases (1990s–) ===
Year	Single	Chart positions						Certifications	Album
Year	Single	US	US AC	US Country	AUS	NED	UK	Certifications	Album
2006	"Baby, It's Cold Outside" (with Martina McBride)	—	7	36	—	—	—		Forever Cool
2011	"The Christmas Blues" (with Ruth Jacott)	—	—	—	—	22	—		Christmas Duets – Back to the Old Days of Christmas!
2011	"Let It Snow! Let It Snow! Let It Snow!"	—	—	—	—	—	69	RIAA: 2× Platinum; BPI: 2× Platinum	A Winter Romance
2018	"Let It Snow! Let It Snow! Let It Snow!" (re-entry)	20	—	—	—	31	54		A Winter Romance
2019	"Let It Snow! Let It Snow! Let It Snow!" (re-entry)	15	—	—	—	46	39		A Winter Romance
2020	"Baby, It's Cold Outside"	45	—	—	—	—	—	RIAA: 2× Platinum; BPI: Silver	A Winter Romance
2020	"Let It Snow! Let It Snow! Let It Snow!" (re-entry)	8	—	—	—	24	37		A Winter Romance
2020	"Rudolph the Red-Nosed Reindeer"	—	—	—	—	113	—		A Winter Romance
2021	"Let It Snow! Let It Snow! Let It Snow!" (re-entry)	12	—	—	—	40	27		A Winter Romance
2021	"Rudolph the Red-Nosed Reindeer" (re-entry)	—	—	—	—	119	—		A Winter Romance
2022	"Let It Snow! Let It Snow! Let It Snow!" (re-entry)	17	—	—	20	17	20		A Winter Romance
2022	"Baby, It's Cold Outside" (re-entry)	—	—	—	—	112	98		A Winter Romance
2022	"Rudolph the Red-Nosed Reindeer" (re-entry)	—	—	—	—	90	—		A Winter Romance
2023	"Let It Snow! Let It Snow! Let It Snow!" (re-entry)	7	—	—	—	15	13	ARIA: Platinum	A Winter Romance
2023	"Rudolph the Red-Nosed Reindeer" (re-entry)	—	—	—	—	79	74	BPI: Silver; BVMI: Gold	A Winter Romance
2024	"Let It Snow! Let It Snow! Let It Snow!" (re-entry)	8	—	—	—	16	20		A Winter Romance
2024	"Baby, It's Cold Outside" (re-entry)	36	—	—	—	—	—		A Winter Romance
2024	"It's Beginning to Look a Lot Like Christmas"	—	—	—	—	120	—		Classic Christmas
2025	"Let It Snow! Let It Snow! Let It Snow!" (re-entry)	7	—	—	—	—	12		A Winter Romance
2025	"Baby, It's Cold Outside" (re-entry)	35	—	—	—	—	96		A Winter Romance
2026	"Let It Snow! Let It Snow! Let It Snow!" (re-entry)	—	—	—	—	—	87		A Winter Romance
"—" denotes releases that did not chart or were not released in that territory.

=== Holiday 100 chart entries ===
Since many radio stations in the US adopt a format change to Christmas music each December, many holiday hits have an annual spike in popularity during the last few weeks of the year and are retired once the season is over. In December 2011, Billboard began a Holiday Songs chart with 50 positions that monitors the last five weeks of each year to "rank the top holiday hits of all eras using the same methodology as the Hot 100, blending streaming, airplay, and sales data". In 2013, the number of positions on the chart was doubled resulting in the Holiday 100. A half-dozen Martin recordings have made appearances on the Holiday 100 and are noted below according to the holiday season in which they charted there.

Title	Holiday season peak chart positions															Album
Title	2011	2012	2013	2014	2015	2016	2017	2018	2019	2020	2021	2022	2023	2024	2025	Album
"Baby, It's Cold Outside" (1959 version)	—	—	87	—	—	—	65	17	23	36	37	38	35	29	33	A Winter Romance
"Baby, It's Cold Outside" (Duet with Martina McBride)	—	—	94	—	69	63	—	—	—	—	—	—	—	—	—	Forever Cool
"Let It Snow! Let It Snow! Let It Snow!"	31	31	31	17	7	11	8	8	6	7	9	9	7	7	7	A Winter Romance
"A Marshmallow World"	—	—	—	—	52	70	—	—	—	—	—	—	—	—	—	The Dean Martin Christmas Album
"Rudolph the Red-Nosed Reindeer"	—	—	63	85	85	78	91	—	71	92	—	—	86	88	—	A Winter Romance
"Silver Bells"	—	—	—	—	—	—	98	76	77	92	95	—	88	85	95	The Dean Martin Christmas Album
