= Dino: The Essential Dean Martin =

Compilation album by Dean Martin
- Released: September 2004
- Genres: Traditional pop, Country
- Length: 77:59
- Label: Capitol

Dean Martin chronology
Lay Some Happiness on Me: The Reprise Years and More 1966-1985 (2001)	Dino: The Essential Dean Martin (2004)	Live from Las Vegas (2005)

Professional ratings
Review scores
Source	Rating
Allmusic	5/5 stars

Dino: The Essential Dean Martin is a 2004 compilation album by Dean Martin, released on September 6, 2004. It contains thirty tracks, twenty from Capitol and ten from Reprise. It has since been reissued in two separate special editions, one in 2005 (augmented with a live disc) and one in 2011 (featuring six bonus tracks). In 2013, Capitol revised the collection again, replacing the Reprise tracks in the 2004 release with Capitol songs.

Alongside track listings and photographs, the liner notes include contributions from Stevie Van Zandt, Deana Martin and Gail Martin Downey. Van Zandt writes about the experience of watching Dean Martin's appearance as the host of the episode of The Hollywood Palace which featured the first US television appearance of The Rolling Stones. Deana Martin shares her memories of the recording session for "Memories Are Made of This" while Downey recalls Martin's explanation of how an empty bottle of Coca-Cola helped make "Houston" a hit.

In the U.S., the album was certified Gold in 2004 and Platinum in 2006 by the RIAA.

== 2004 release ==
The included version of "You're Nobody till Somebody Loves You" is the 1960 Capitol album track rather than the charting 1964 Reprise version: William Ruhlmann of AllMusic suggests that the substitution was made in order to reduce the number of similar Reprise arrangements present.

=== Track listing ===
No.	Title	First appearance	Length
1.	"Ain't That a Kick in the Head?"	Capitol #4420 (08/08/1960)	2:24
2.	"That's Amore"	Capitol #2589 (09/14/1953)	3:07
3.	"Memories Are Made of This"	Capitol #EAP1 701, Capitol #3295 (11/28/1955)	2:16
4.	"Just in Time"	This Time I'm Swingin'! (Capitol #1442, 10/1960), Capitol #4391 (06/20/1960)	2:13
5.	"Sway"	Capitol #2818 (05/24/1954)	2:42
6.	"I'd Cry Like a Baby"	Capitol #2749 (03/08/1954)	2:35
7.	"Volare (Nel Blu di Pinto di Blu)"	Capitol #4028 (08/11/1958)	2:59
8.	"Under the Bridges of Paris"	Capitol #3036 (02/07/1955)	2:46
9.	"Love Me, Love Me"	Capitol #2485 (06/01/1953)	2:34
10.	"If"	Capitol #1342 (12/11/1950)	2:46
11.	"Mambo Italiano"	Capitol EAP1 9123 (1955)	2:19
12.	"Let Me Go, Lover!"	Capitol EAP1 9123 (1955)	3:00
13.	"Standing on the Corner"	Capitol #3414 (04/20/1956)	2:47
14.	"You Belong to Me"	Capitol #2165 (07/28/1952)	3:02
15.	"Powder Your Face with Sunshine (Smile! Smile! Smile!)"	Capitol #15351 (01/17/1949)	2:32
16.	"Innamorata (Sweetheart)"	Capitol #3352 (02/13/1956)	2:24
17.	"I'll Always Love You (Day After Day)"	Capitol #1028 (05/22/1950)	2:33
18.	"Kiss"	Capitol #2319 (12/29/1952)	2:22
19.	"You're Nobody till Somebody Loves You"	This Time I'm Swingin'! (10/1960)	2:12
20.	"Return to Me (Ritorna-Me)"	Capitol #3894 (02/17/1958)	2:23
21.	"The Door Is Still Open (to My Heart)"	The Door Is Still Open to My Heart (Reprise RS-6140, 11/1964), Reprise #0307 (09/02/1964)	2:53
22.	"Houston"	Houston (Reprise RS-6181, 10/1965), Reprise #0393 (07/14/1965)	2:41
23.	"Send Me the Pillow You Dream On"	Dean Martin Hits Again (Reprise RS-6146, 01/1965), Reprise #0344 (01/27/1965)	2:29
24.	"Everybody Loves Somebody"	Everybody Loves Somebody (Reprise RS-6130, 06/1964), Reprise #0281 (05/06/1964)	2:45
25.	"In the Chapel in the Moonlight"	Dean Martin Hits Again (Reprise RS-6146, 01/1965), Reprise #0601 (06/14/1967)	2:32
26.	"I Will"	Houston (Reprise RS-6181, 10/1965), Reprise #0415 (10/06/1965)	2:22
27.	"Little Ole Wine Drinker, Me"	Welcome to My World (Reprise RS-6250, 07/1967), Reprise #0608 (07/12/1967)	2:48
28.	"Somewhere There's a Someone"	Somewhere There's a Someone (Reprise RS-6201, 02/1966), Reprise #0443 (01/19/1966)	2:14
29.	"In the Misty Moonlight"	The Door Is Still Open to My Heart (Reprise RS-6140, 11/1964), Reprise #0640 (11/08/1967)	2:44
30.	"Gentle on My Mind"	Gentle on My Mind (Reprise RS-6330, 11/1968), Reprise #0812 (02/08/1969)	2:35

== 2005 live disc ==
Recorded on July 27, 1962, at the Cal Neva Lodge & Casino. The full concert was released as the third disc of the 2012 box set Collected Cool.

Live from Lake Tahoe 1962
No.	Title	Length
1.	"Introduction by Frank Sinatra/Drink to Me Only with Thine Eyes/Almost Like Being in Love/I Love Tahoe"	6:03
2.	"My Kind of Girl"	3:31
3.	"Monologue"	5:04
4.	"June in January"	2:55
5.	"I'm Gonna Sit Right Down and Write Myself a Letter/Volare/On an Evening in Roma"	4:54
6.	"Rock-a-Bye Your Baby with a Dixie Melody"	3:40
7.	"Break It to Me Gently"	2:42
Total length:		28:49

== 2011 bonus tracks ==
The 2011 edition was split across two discs, both containing eighteen tracks. The first disc contains the first sixteen tracks of the standard edition with two additions.

No.	Title	Writer(s)	First appearance	Length
12.	"Angel Baby"	John Michael & Carl Niessen	Capitol 3988 (1958)	2:47
18.	"Rock-a-Bye Your Baby with a Dixie Melody"	Jean Schwartz, Sam M. Lewis, Joe Young	Previously unreleased (recorded 1950)	2:17

The second disc includes the remaining fourteen tracks from the standard edition with four additions.

No.	Title	Writer(s)	First appearance	Length
1.	"On an Evening in Roma (Sott'er celo de Roma)"	Alessandro Taccani, Nan Frederics, Umberto Bertini	Capitol 4222 (1959)	2:25
2.	"Money Burns A Hole In My Pocket"	Bob Hilliard, Jule Styne	Capitol 2818 (1954)	3:03
3.	"Cha Cha Cha D'Amour (Melodie d'Amour)"	Henri Salvador, Leo Johns	Cha Cha de Amor (1962)	2:19
15.	"(Remember Me) I'm the One Who Loves You"	Stuart Hamblen	(Remember Me) I'm the One Who Loves You (1965), Reprise 0369 (1965)	2:27

== 2013 release ==
The 2013 edition consisted of 30 tracks on two CDs and replaced all of the Reprise tracks with Capitol songs. It is this release found on most streaming services.

=== Track listing ===
No.	Title	Writer(s)	First appearance	Length
1.	"Ain't That a Kick in the Head?"			2:24
2.	"That's Amore"			3:07
3.	"Memories Are Made of This"			2:16
4.	"Just in Time"			2:13
5.	"I'd Cry Like a Baby"			2:35
6.	"Volare (Nel Blu di Pinto di Blu)"			2:59
7.	"Under the Bridges of Paris"			2:46
8.	"Sway"			2:42
9.	"Love Me, Love Me"			2:34
10.	"On an Evening in Roma (Sott'er celo de Roma)"			2:25
11.	"If"			2:46
12.	"Angel Baby"			2:47
13.	"Powder Your Face with Sunshine (Smile! Smile! Smile!)"			2:32
14.	"Innamorata (Sweetheart)"			2:24
15.	"Rock-a-Bye Your Baby with a Dixie Melody"			2:17
16.	"Mambo Italiano"			2:19
17.	"You Belong to Me"			3:02
18.	"Money Burns A Hole In My Pocket"			3:03
19.	"Cha Cha Cha D'Amour (Melodie d'Amour)"			2:19
20.	"Standing on the Corner"			2:47
21.	"Hey, Brother, Pour the Wine"	Ross Bagdasarian	Capitol #C2749 (12/23/1953)	2:38
22.	"I'll Always Love You (Day After Day)"			2:33
23.	"Good Mornin' Life"	R. I. Allen, Joseph Meyer	Capitol #F3841 (11/1957)	2:14
24.	"You're Nobody till Somebody Loves You"			2:12
25.	"Return to Me (Ritorna-Me)"			2:23
26.	"Carolina in the Morning"	Walter Donaldson, Gus Kahn	Swingin' Down Yonder (Capitol T-576, 08/01/1955)	2:17
27.	"That Certain Party"	Walter Donaldson, Gus Kahn	Dean Martin and Jerry Lewis; Capitol 15249 (10/1948)	3:03
28.	"My Rifle, My Pony and Me"	Dimitri Tiomkin, Paul Francis Webster	Capitol #F4174 (03/1959)	2:44
29.	"On the Street Where You Live"	Alan Jay Lerner, Frederick Loewe	This Time I'm Swingin'! (Capitol #1442, 05/1960)	3:41
30.	"Arrivederci Roma"	Sandro Giovannini, Renato Rascel, Pietro Garinei, Carl Sigman	Dino: Italian Love Songs (Capitol #T-1659, 02/05/1962)	2:40

== Charts ==
=== Weekly charts ===
Chart (2004)	Peak position
Australian Albums (ARIA)	29
Austrian Albums (Ö3 Austria)	53
German Albums (Offizielle Top 100)	91
Irish Albums (IRMA)	7
New Zealand Albums (RMNZ)	19
Scottish Albums (Official Charts)	17
UK Albums (Official Charts)	25
US Billboard 200	28

=== Year-end charts ===
Chart (2004)	Position
US Billboard 200	184

== Certifications ==
Region	Certification	Certified units/sales
United Kingdom (BPI)	Gold	100,000^{^}
United States (RIAA)	Platinum	1,000,000^{^}
^{^} Shipments figures based on certification alone.
