= Please Don't Talk About Me When I'm Gone =

1930 song by Sam H. Stept with lyrics by Sidney Clare

"Please Don't Talk About Me When I'm Gone" is a song published in 1930. It was written by Sam H. Stept with lyrics by Sidney Clare. The original publication also credited singer Bee Palmer as co-composer.

== Background ==
The lyrics are an admonishment between parting lovers, where the singer asks the other to either speak nicely of her, or not at all.

== 1931 recordings ==
Early hit versions in 1931 were by Gene Austin and Bert Lown.

== Other notable recordings ==
- Ethel Waters – recorded February 10, 1931 for Columbia Records (catalog No. 2409D).
- Doris Day – in her album Lullaby of Broadway (1951).
- The Mills Brothers with Tommy Dorsey and His Sentimentalists (1951).
- Johnnie Ray (1953) This charted briefly in the No. 29 spot.
- Billie Holiday – included in her album Velvet Mood (1956).
- Bing Crosby (1957)
- Bill Haley & His Comets – for the album Rockin' the Oldies (1957).
- Kay Starr – included in her album Losers, Weepers (1960)
- Dean Martin – for his album This Time I'm Swingin'! (1960).
- Mose Allison – for his album Takes to the Hills (1961).
- Frank Sinatra – for his album Swing Along with Me (1961).
- Sammy Davis Jr. – included in the album The Sounds of '66 (1966).
- Connie Francis – included in her album Connie & Clyde – Hit Songs of the 30s (1968).
- Helen Humes – for her album Songs I Like To Sing! (1961).
- Ann-Margret – for her album The Vivacious One (1962).
- Ray Price – included in the album Portrait of a Singer (1985).
- Piano Red – in the album Percussive Piano "Dr. Feelgood" (1976).
- Leon Redbone – for his album Champagne Charlie (1978).
- Ella Fitzgerald – with Count Basie & His Orchestra, in the album A Perfect Match (1979).
- Pete Seeger & Arlo Guthrie – on the 1981 live recorded album Precious Friend.
- Bob Wills & His Texas Playboys – this can be found on the album The Tiffany Transcriptions Vol. 3: Basin Street Blues (1984).
- Rita Reys – included in the album Live at the Concertgebouw (1986).
- Harry Connick Jr. and Carmen McRae – included in the album 20 (1988).
- Jerry Lee Lewis – included in the compilation box set All Killer, No Filler: The Anthology issued in 1993.
- Willie Nelson – for his album Moonlight Becomes You (1994).
- Barney Bigard – in the album Barney Bigard in Chronology 1944-1945 (1997).
- Dean Martin (virtual duet with Robbie Williams) – included in the album Forever Cool (2007)
- Deana Martin – included on her album Volare, released in 2009 by Big Fish Records.
- The Original Rabbit Foot Spasm Band in 2009

== Film appearances ==
- This song is sung by Norma Shearer's character Mary Haines in the 1939 film The Women as a joke when she leaves her girl friends alone at tea while she takes a call from her philandering husband Stephen Haines.
- The song was used in the film House of Strangers (1949) when it was performed by Dolores Parker at the restaurant.
- In the 1950 film The Breaking Point, it was sung by Patricia Neal at the bar.
- In Lullaby of Broadway (1951), it was sung by Gladys George.
- The song was also sung by the character Michigan J. Frog in the 1955 Warner Bros. animated short, One Froggy Evening.

== In popular culture ==
- Television anchor Edwin Newman sang the song during his hosting of Saturday Night Live in 1984.
- Jamie Cullum also performed the song on the last Michael Parkinson chat show in December 2007.
