= Come On Down =

Come On Down may refer to:

== Albums ==
- Come On Down! (Eddie Harris album), 1970
- Come On Down (Jimmy Ponder album), 1991
- Come On Down (EP), a 1985 EP by Green River
- Come On Down, a 1976 album by Del Delker
- Come On Down: The Complete MGM Recordings, a 2012 album by Every Mother's Son
- Come On Down, a 2013 album by David Gogo

== Songs ==
- "Come On Down" (Crystal Waters song), 2001
- "Come On Down" (High Valley song), 2014
- "Come On Down (From the Top of That Hill)", a 1967 single by Jackie DeShannon
- "Come On Down", a 1969 song by Savage Grace
- "Come On Down", a 1970 single by Dean Martin
- "Come On Down", a 1972 song by New Colony Six
- "Come On Down", a 1975 single by Tennessee Ernie Ford
- "Come On Down", a song by Bux from the 1976 album We Came to Play
- "Come On Down", a 1985 single by Captain Sensible
- "Come On Down", a song by Big Daddy Kane from the 1991 album Prince of Darkness
- "Come On Down", a song by TLC from the 1999 album FanMail
- "Come On Down", a song by Zed from the 2000 album Silencer
- "Come On Down", a song by De La Soul from the 2004 album The Grind Date
- "Come On Down", a song by Third Day from the 2010 album Move

== Other ==
- Come On Down! The Game Show Story, a 2014 ITV British documentary mini-series presented by Bradley Walsh
- "Come on down!", a phrase used on American game show The Price Is Right
