= Forever Cool =

Compilation album by Dean Martin
- Released: August 14, 2007
- Studio: Capitol (Hollywood)
- Genre: Vocal jazz
- Length: 40:26
- Label: Capitol
- Producer: Jimmy Bowen

Dean Martin chronology
Dino: The Essential Dean Martin (2004)	Forever Cool (2007)	Amore (2009)

Forever Cool is a compilation album of duets, featuring singer Dean Martin paired with various artists. It was released in 2007 (12 years after his death) through Capitol Records.

Unlike several duet albums (for example, fellow Rat Pack singer Frank Sinatra's 1993 duets album), this posthumous one utilizes the archived voice tracks of Martin himself paired with contemporary singers and instrumentalists such as Kevin Spacey, Martina McBride, Shelby Lynne, Joss Stone, Chris Botti, and a few others.

== Reception ==
Professional ratings
Review scores
Source	Rating
AllMusic	3.5/5 stars

Jeff Tamarkin of AllMusic criticizes other vocal artists such as Robbie Williams for his appearance in "Please Don't Talk About Me When I'm Gone", stating he is out of his league. He also stated that Joss Stone and former American Idol contestant Paris Bennett did not stand a chance. Tamarkin, however, praises the instrumentalists Big Bad Voodoo Daddy, and smooth jazz artists Chris Botti and Dave Koz for lightening up the tracks "Who's Got The Action", "I've Grown Accustomed To Her Face" and "Just In Time" respectively. The only true standout in the bunch with as much certifiable personality as Martin was French artist Charles Aznavour for his duet with Dino on "Everybody Loves Somebody". The disadvantage was that the original hit single was not used but instead a lesser version. In the end, Tamarkin indicates that "it's Dean Martin who saves the day each time out".

This album peaked at No. 39 on the Billboard 200 albums chart in 2007.

== Track listing ==
1. "Who's Got the Action?" (George Duning) featuring Big Bad Voodoo Daddy
2. "Ain't That a Kick in the Head?" (Jimmy Van Heusen, Sammy Cahn) featuring Kevin Spacey
3. "I've Grown Accustomed to Her Face" (Frederick Loewe, Alan Jay Lerner) featuring Chris Botti
4. "Baby O" (Johnny Mercer, John Rotella) featuring Paris Bennett
5. "Who Was That Lady?" (Heusen and Cahn) with The Capitol Studios Orchestra
6. "Please Don't Talk About Me When I'm Gone" (Sam H. Stept, Sidney Clare) featuring Robbie Williams
7. "I Can't Believe That You're in Love with Me" (Clarence Gaskill, Jimmy McHugh) featuring Joss Stone
8. "Just in Time" (Jule Styne, Betty Comden, Adolph Green) featuring Dave Koz
9. "Baby, It's Cold Outside" (Frank Loesser) featuring Martina McBride
10. "King of the Road" (Roger Miller) featuring Kevin Spacey
11. "You're Nobody till Somebody Loves You" (Russ Morgan, Larry Stock, James Cavanaugh) featuring Shelby Lynne and Big Bad Voodoo Daddy
12. "Arrivederci Roma" (Renato Rascel, Pietro Garinei, Sandro Giovannini, Carl Sigman) featuring Tiziano Ferro
13. "Everybody Loves Somebody" (Irving Taylor, Ken Lane) featuring Charles Aznavour
14. "Lullaby" (Johannes Brahms/Traditional) [Acoustic]

== Charts ==
Chart performance
Chart (2007)	Peak position
Australian Albums (ARIA)	27
Austrian Albums (Ö3 Austria)	6
Canadian Albums (Nielsen SoundScan)	42
French Albums (SNEP)	94
German Albums (Offizielle Top 100)	27
Italian Albums (FIMI)	87
US Billboard 200	39
