= Your Other Love =

Single by Connie Francis
- B-side: "Whatever Happened to Rosemarie"
- Released: October 1963
- Genre: Pop rock
- Length: 2:05
- Label: MGM; 13176
- Songwriters: Claus Ogerman, Ben Raleigh

Connie Francis singles chronology
"Drownin' My Sorrows" (July 1963)	"Your Other Love" (1963)	"In the Summer of His Years" (December 1963)

"Your Other Love" is a song written by Claus Ogerman and Ben Raleigh and most notably performed by Connie Francis. Ogerman had arranged and conducted the recording by Francis as well.

== Overview ==
The song was recorded in 1963, and came after a small chart decline, but the track did better than her last single, reaching No. 10 on the U.S. adult contemporary chart, No. 28 on the Billboard Hot 100, and No. 32 in Canada.

The B-side, a more rock 'n' roll song, charted at the same position as "Your Other Love" in Australia, (No. 54) and a low No. 136 on Cash Box. Later it was included in her Rocksides (1957–64) compilation.

"Your Other Love" was released as a single in Japan with "Danke Schoen", both songs in Japanese. The song was released as the B-side to her French version of "My Heart Cries For You" in 1967 as "Un autre amour".

== Charts ==
=== Your Other Love ===
Chart (1963)	Peak position
US Billboard Hot 100	28
US Easy Listening	10
US Record World	20
US Cash Box	22
CA Top 100 Singles	32
AUS Top 100 Singles	54

=== Whatever Happened to Rosemarie ===
Chart (1963)	Peak position
US Cash Box	136
AUS Top 100 Singles	54

== Other versions ==
Dean Martin had a male version written for him, which he included in his 1964 Everybody Loves Somebody compilation album.
