= Hey, Brother, Pour the Wine =

Compilation album by Dean Martin
- Released: 1964
- Length: 29 minutes 11 seconds
- Label: Capitol

Dean Martin compilation album chronology
Everybody Loves Somebody (1964)	Hey, Brother, Pour the Wine (1964)	The Lush Years (1965)

Hey, Brother, Pour the Wine is a 1964 compilation album by Capitol Records released after Dean Martin moved to Reprise Records. It collects several non-LP singles and album tracks recorded by Dean while with Capitol.

== Reception ==
The initial Billboard review said that "For those who do not have these easy, happy-go-lucky performances this LP is a must," adding that "'Memories Are Made of This,' 'Sway,' 'Standing on the Corner,' and the title tune all sound as fresh as when first released.

William Ruhlman on AllMusic stated that "...Here, Capitol focused on his boozy image with the title song, used a few of his hits ('Sway,' 'Memories Are Made of This,' and 'Standing on the Corner') and filled up the rest of the 11-track LP with old singles tracks."

== Track listing ==
1. "Hey, Brother, Pour the Wine" (Ross Bagdasarian) - 2:53
2. "Sway (Quien Sera)" (Pablo Ruiz, Norman Gimbel) - 2:45
3. "Try Again" (Bergdahl, Killman, May)
4. "The Man Who Plays the Mandolino" (Fanciulla, Marilyn Keith, Alan Bergman)
5. "Memories Are Made of This" (Terry Gilkyson, Richard Dehr, Frank Miller) - 2:17
6. "Peddler Man (Ten I Loved)" (Nicholas Brodszky, Jack Lawrence)
7. "Standing on the Corner" (Frank Loesser) - 2:51
8. "Love Me! Love Me!" (Walker, Di Chiarra)
9. "That's What I Like" (Jule Styne, Bob Hilliard)
10. "Solitaire" (Cuion, Borck, Nutter)
11. "Just in Time" (Betty Comden, Jule Styne, Adolph Green) - 2:16

=== Bonus tracks from 2005 Collectors' Choice reissue ===
12. "You Was" (with Peggy Lee) (Paul Francis Webster, Sonny Burke) - 2:49
13. "I'm in Love with You" (with Margaret Whiting) (Don Raye, Gene de Paul) - 2:54
14. "We Never Talk Much" (with Helen O'Connell) (Nicholas Brodskzy, Sammy Cahn)
15. "Relax-Ay-Voo" (with Line Renaud) (Arthur Schwartz, Sammy Cahn)
16. "Ev'ry Street's a Boulevard in Old New York" (with Jerry Lewis) (Styne, Hilliard)
