= Ernie McKay =

American musician

Ernie McKay is an American musician who led a territory band in Columbus, Ohio.

Documentation listing musicians who performed with Ernie McKay and his Orchestra has not been made available, although the best-known name associated with McKay is that of young Dean Martin (using his birth name, Dino Crocetti) who sang with the band in the 1930s. It was McKay who changed Crocetti's name to Dino Martini. Another familiar personality, Paul "Snook" Neal, who was inducted into the Columbus Senior Musicians Hall of Fame in 1996, played with the band.
