= Everybody Loves Somebody (album) =

Compilation album by Dean Martin
- Released: August 4, 1964
- Genre: Traditional pop
- Label: Reprise
- Producer: Jimmy Bowen

Dean Martin compilation album chronology
Martin Magic (1958)	Everybody Loves Somebody (1964)	Hey, Brother, Pour the Wine (1964)

Professional ratings
Review scores
Source	Rating
Record Mirror	4/5 stars

Everybody Loves Somebody is a 1964 album by Dean Martin on Reprise Records.

== Overview ==
The album was assembled quickly from B-sides and previously released album cuts recorded between February 1962 and April 1964 to capitalize on the success of the title track, but still reached number two on the Billboard Top LPs and obtained Gold certification. It was released on the same day as the Dream with Dean studio album which also contained another version of "Everybody Loves Somebody", but not the version on the singles charts, hence the B-sides compilation had "The Hit Version" emblazoned on the cover and outsold the new studio album.

== Track listing ==
1. "Everybody Loves Somebody" (No. 1 pop, No. 1 AC, No. 11 UK, second version recorded April 16, 1964; first appearance on an album)
2. "Your Other Love" (Recorded April 16, 1964; first appearance on an album)
3. "Shutters and Boards" (Recorded December 12, 1962; previously on Dean "Tex" Martin Country Style)
4. "Baby-O" (A-side recorded February 13, 1962; first appearance on an album)
5. "A Little Voice" (B-side of "Everybody Loves Somebody," recorded April 16, 1964; first appearance on an album)
6. "Things" (Recorded December 13, 1962; previously on Dean "Tex" Martin Country Style)
7. "My Heart Cries for You" (Recorded December 11, 1962; previously on Dean "Tex" Martin Country Style)
8. "Siesta Fiesta" (Recorded April 16, 1964; first appearance on an album)
9. "From Lover to Loser" (Recorded April 23, 1963; previously on Dean "Tex" Martin Rides Again)
10. "Just Close Your Eyes" (B-side of "Tik-A-Tee, Tik-A-Tay," recorded February 13, 1962; first appearance on an album)
11. "Corrine Corrina" (A-side recorded April 24, 1963; previously on Dean "Tex" Martin Rides Again)
12. "Face in a Crowd" (No. 128 pop, A-side recorded December 12, 1962; previously on Dean "Tex" Martin Country Style)
