= Live from Las Vegas (Dean Martin album) =

Live album by Dean Martin
- Released: 2005
- Label: Capitol
- Producer: Charles Pignone and Terry Woodson

Dean Martin live album chronology
Live at the Sands Hotel (2001)	Live from Las Vegas (2005)	Live from Lake Tahoe 1962 (2005)

Live from Las Vegas is a live album of an April 4, 1967 performance by Dean Martin at the Sands Hotel in Las Vegas. It was released in 2005 as part of the Las Vegas Centennial Collection.

== Track listing ==
1. Fanfare with Intro & Opening Theme ("Everybody Loves Somebody") (Irving Taylor, Ken Lane)
2. "Drink to Me Only with Thine Eyes" / "Pennies from Heaven (Bourbon)" / "Hello, Dolly (Vegas)!" (Ben Jonson/Johnston - Johnny Burke/Jerry Herman)
3. Monologue
4. "June in January" (Leo Robin, Ralph Rainger)
5. "Everybody Loves Somebody" (Irving Taylor, Ken Lane)
6. "Baby Face" (Benny Davis, Harry Akst)
7. "That's Amore" (Harry Warren, Jack Brooks)
8. "Everybody Loves Somebody" Instrumental run-off / Monologue (Irving Taylor, Ken Lane)
9. "Try a Little Tenderness" / "Love Walked In" / "Cecilia" / "Me and My Gal" / "Swing Low, Sweet Chariot" / "(All Of a Sudden) My Heart Sings" / "There's No Tomorrow" (O Sole Mio) / "It was a Very Good Year" (Harry M. Woods, Jimmy Campbell, Reg Connelly/George Gershwin, Ira Gershwin/Dave Dreyer, Harry Ruby/Douglas Furber, Noel Gay /Traditional/Harold Rome, Henri Laurent Herpin, Jamblan/Hoffman - Corday - Carr, Ervin Drake)
10. "You Made Me Love You" / "It Had to Be You" / "Nevertheless" (James V. Monaco - McCarthy, Gus Kahn, Isham Jones/Bert Kalmar, Harry Ruby)
11. "Welcome to My World" (Ray Winkler, John Hathcock)
12. "If You Knew Susie (Like I Know Susie)" (Buddy DeSylva, Joseph Meyer)
13. "Volare" (Nel Blu Di Pinto Di Blu) / "On an Evening in Roma (Sott'er celo de Roma)" (Mitchell Parish, Franco Migliacci, Domenico Modugno/Sandro Taccani, Umberto Bertini, Nan Fredricks)
14. Monologue
15. Celebrity Introduction
16. "Mr. Wonderful" (Jerry Bock, Larry Holofcener, George David Weiss)
17. Closing Theme ("Everybody Loves Somebody") (Irving Taylor, Ken Lane)
