= Dino (album) =

Studio album by Dean Martin
- Released: January 1972
- Recorded: 1971
- Genre: Country
- Length: 29:37
- Label: Reprise – R/RS 6428
- Producer: Jimmy Bowen

Dean Martin chronology
For the Good Times (1971)	Dino (1972)	Sittin' on Top of the World (1973)

Dino is the thirtieth studio album by Dean Martin arranged by Larry Muhoberac and produced by Jimmy Bowen.

== Overview ==
The album peaked at 117 on the Billboard 200, and was the last of Martin's albums to chart. It was reissued on CD by Hip-O Records in 2009.

== Reception ==
Professional ratings
Review scores
Source	Rating
Allmusic	2.5/5 stars

The initial Billboard review from 22 January 1972 singled out Martin's cover of Kris Kristofferson's "Kiss the World Goodbye", writing that "The impact hits you on the second or third hearing".

William Ruhlmann on AllMusic wrote that "Martin fans who enjoyed his latter-day country sound may have been pleased but, as the generic album title suggested, Dino was a minor effort".

== Track listing ==
=== Side one ===
1. "What's Yesterday" (Peter Andreoli, Tony Bruno) – 3:17
2. "The Small Exception of Me" (Tony Hatch, Jackie Trent) – 3:10
3. "Just the Other Side of Nowhere" (Kris Kristofferson) – 2:20
4. "Blue Memories" (J. A. Balthrop) – 3:01
5. "Guess Who" (Jesse Belvin, JoAnne Belvin) – 2:52

=== Side two ===
1. "Party Dolls and Wine" (Joe Barnhill) – 2:52
2. "I Don't Know What I'm Doing" (Balthrop) – 3:03
3. "I Can Give You What You Want Now" (Carl Belew, Ketti Frings) – 2:15
4. "The Right Kind of Woman" (Baker Knight) – 2:29
5. "Kiss the World Goodbye" (Kristofferson) – 3:24

== Personnel ==
- Dean Martin – vocals
- Larry Muhoberac – arranger
- Jimmy Bowen – record producer
