= This Time I'm Swingin'! =

Studio album by Dean Martin
- Released: October 3, 1960
- Recorded: May 1960
- Studios: Capitol Recording Studio, Hollywood
- Genre: Vocal jazz
- Length: 31:50
- Label: Capitol
- Producer: Lee Gillette

Dean Martin chronology
| A Winter Romance (1959) | This Time I'm Swingin'! (1960) | Dino: Italian Love Songs (1962) |

This Time I'm Swingin'! is the sixth studio album by Dean Martin for Capitol Records. The sessions yielding this album's songs were recorded in May 1960. While thirteen tracks were recorded during the three sessions, only twelve of them made it onto the album when it was released October 3, 1960. "Ain't That a Kick in the Head" was recorded during those sessions (May 10) but not released. The backing orchestra was conducted and arranged by Nelson Riddle. The original album consisted of twelve songs, many with prominent brass arrangements.

Professional ratings
Review scores
| Source | Rating |
|---|---|
| Allmusic | link |

== Track listing ==
=== LP ===
Capitol Records Catalog Number (S) T-1659

Capitol Records Release Number T-1442 (Monaural Copy)

==== Side A ====
| Track | Song title | Written by | Recording date | Session information | Time |
|---|---|---|---|---|---|
| 1. | "I Can't Believe That You're in Love with Me" | Clarence Gaskill and Jimmy McHugh | May 17, 1960 | Session 9459; Master 33850 | 2:27 |
| 2. | "True Love" | Cole Porter | May 17, 1960 | Session 9459; Master 33848 | 2:35 |
| 3. | "You're Nobody till Somebody Loves You" | Russ Morgan, Larry Stock and James Cavanaugh | May 10, 1960 | Session 9444S, Master 33806 | 2:15 |
| 4. | "On the Street Where You Live" | Frederick Loewe and Alan Jay Lerner | May 9, 1960 | Session 9441S, Master 33745 | 3:43 |
| 5. | "Imagination" | Johnny Burke and Jimmy Van Heusen | May 9, 1960 | Session 9441S; Master 33747 | 3:16 |
| 6. | "(It Will Have to Do) Until the Real Thing Comes Along" | Mann Holiner, Saul Chaplin, Alberta Nichols, Sammy Cahn and L.E. Freeman | May 10, 1960 | Session 9444S; Master 33804 | 3:03 |

==== Side B ====
| Track | Song title | Written by | Recording date | Session information | Time |
|---|---|---|---|---|---|
| 1. | "Please Don't Talk About Me When I'm Gone" | Sam H. Stept, Sidney Clare and Bee Palmer | May 10, 1960 | Session 9444S; Master 33805 | 2:26 |
| 2. | "I've Grown Accustomed to Her Face" | Loewe and Lerner | May 9, 1960 | Session 9441S; Master 33746 | 2:44 |
| 3. | "Someday (You'll Want Me to Want You)" | Jimmie Hodges | May 9, 1960 | Session 9441S; Master 33744 | 2:23 |
| 4. | "Mean to Me" | Roy Turk and Fred Ahlert | May 10, 1960 | Session 9444S; Master 33808 | 2:11 |
| 5. | "Heaven Can Wait" | Eddie DeLange and Van Heusen | May 17, 1960 | Session 9459; Master 33849 | 2:31 |
| 6. | "Just in Time" | Jule Styne, Betty Comden and Adolph Green | May 17, 1960 | Session 9459; Master 33847 | 2:16 |

=== Compact disc ===
1997 EMI/Capitol combined This Time I'm Swingin! with Pretty Baby (from 1957). Catalog Number 7243 8 54546 2 9. (in MONO !)

==== 2005 Collectors' Choice Music reissue ====
The 2005 Collectors' Choice Music reissue added four more tracks to the twelve tracks on the original Capitol LP. Catalog Number WWCCM06052. (STEREO - Bonustracks in MONO)

| Track | Song title | Written by | Recording date | Session information | Time |
|---|---|---|---|---|---|
| 1. | "My Own, My Only, My All" | Jay Livingston and Ray Evans | June 20, 1949 | Session 1364A; Master 4520-2 | 3:00 |
| 2. | "Bonne Nuit (Goodnight)" | Jay Livingston and Evans | April 9, 1951 | Session 2108; Master 7327-9 | 2:41 |
| 3. | "You and Your Beautiful Eyes" | Mack David and Jerry Livingston | December 2, 1950 | Session 1992; Master 6889-15 | 2:08 |
| 4. | "Choo'N Gum" | Vic Mizzy and Mann Curtis | March 28, 1950 | Session 1693; Master 5699-2 | 2:26 |

== Personnel ==
- Dean Martin: vocals
- Nelson Riddle: leader
- Emanuel 'Mannie' Klein: contractor (Session 9441S)
- Sol Klein: contractor (Sessions 9444S and 9459)
- Alton R. 'Al' Hendrickson: guitar
- Joseph G. 'Joe' Comfort: bass
- Irving Cottler: drums (Session 9441S)
- Alvin A. Stoller: drums (Sessions 9444S and 9459)
- William Miller: piano
- Jacques Gasselin: cello (Session 9459)
- Edgar 'Ed' Lustgarten: cello
- Eleanor Aller Slatkin: cello
- Alvin Dinkin: viola (Sessions 9444S and 9459)
- Stanley Harris: viola (Session 9441S)
- Paul Robyn: viola
- Victor Arno: violin (Session 9459)
- Victor Bay: violin
- Alex Beller: violin
- Harry Bluestone: violin (Session 9441S)
- Jacques Gasselin: violin (Session 9441S)
- Daniel 'Dan' Lube: violin
- Marshall Sosson: violin (Session 9444S and 9459)
- Felix Slatkin: violin (Session 9444S)
- Gerald Vinci: violin (Sessions 9441S and 9444S)
- William M. 'Buddy' Collette: saxophone
- John 'Plas' Johnson Jr.: saxophone
- Harry G. Klee: saxophone
- Joseph J. Koch: saxophone
- Ronald 'Ronnie Lang' Langinger: saxophone (Session 9441S)
- Wilbur Schwartz: saxophone (Sessions 9444S and 9459)
- Russell Brown: trombone
- Richard L. 'Dick' Noel: trombone
- Thomas 'Tom' Pederson: trombone (Sessions 9441S and 9444S)
- Thomas Shepard: trombone
- Walter P. 'Pete' Candoli: trumpet
- Donald A. Fagerquist: trumpet (Session 9441S)
- Conrad Gozzo: trumpet (Session 9444S)
- Dale McMickle: trumpet (Session 9459)
- Carroll Lewis: trumpet
- Clarence F. 'Shorty' Sherock: trumpet

Tracks 1, 2, 11, 12,

17-May-1960 (Tuesday) - Hollywood. Capitol Tower Studio A

Conte Candoli, Dale McMickle, Cappy Lewis, Shorty Sherock (tpt); Russell Brown, Dick Noel, Tom Shepard (tbn); Buddy Collette, Plas Johnson, Harry Klee, Joe Koch, Willie Schwartz (sax); Victor Bay, Alex Beller, Dan Lube, Marshall Sosson, Victor Arno (vln); Alvin Dinkin, Paul Robyn (via); Edgar Lustgarten, Eleanor Slatkin, Jacques Gasselin (vlc); Bill Miller (p); Al Hendrickson (g); Joe Comfort (b); Alvin Stoller (d); Nelson Riddle (arr/cond).

Tracks 3, 6, 7, 10,

10-May-1960 (Tuesday) - Hollywood. Capitol Tower Studio A

Conte Candoli, Conrad Gozzo, Cappy Lewis, Shorty Sherock (tpt); Russell Brown, Dick Noel, Tommy Pederson, Tom Shepard (tbn); Buddy Collette, Plas Johnson, Harry Klee, Joe Koch, Willie Schwartz (sax); Victor Bay, Alex Beller, Gerald Vinci, Dan Lube, Marshall Sosson, Felix Slatkin (vln); Alvin Dinkin, Paul Robyn (via); Edgar Lustgarten, Eleanor Slatkin (vlc); Bill Miller (p); Al Hendrickson (g); Joe Comfort (b); Alvin Stoller (d); Nelson Riddle (arr/cond).

Tracks 4, 5, 8, 9,

09-May-1960 (Monday) - Hollywood. Capitol Tower Studio A

Conte Candoli, Don Fagerquist, Cappy Lewis, Shorty Sherock (tpt); Russell Brown, Dick Noel, Tommy Pederson, Tom Shepard (tbn); Buddy Collette, Plas Johnson, Harry Klee, Joe Koch, Ronnie Lang (sax); Harry Bluestone, Victor Bay, Alex Beller, Gerald Vinci, Dan Lube, Jacques Gasselin (vln); Stanley Harris, Paul Robyn (via); Edgar Lustgarten, Eleanor Slatkin (vlc); Bill Miller (p); Al Hendrickson (g); Joe Comfort (b); Irving Cottler (d); Nelson Riddle (arr/cond).
