= Dino: Italian Love Songs =

Studio album by Dean Martin
- Released: February 5, 1962
- Recorded: September 6–8, 1961
- Studios: 1750 N. Vine Street, Hollywood, California
- Genres: Vocal jazz, traditional pop
- Length: 33:02
- Label: Capitol
- Producer: Dave Cavanaugh

Dean Martin chronology
| This Time I'm Swingin'! (1960) | Dino: Italian Love Songs (1962) | French Style (1962) |

Singles from Dino: The Italian Love Songs
- 1. "On an Evening in Roma" Released: June 8, 1959

Professional ratings
Review scores
| Source | Rating |
|---|---|
| Allmusic | 4.5/5 stars |

Dino: Italian Love Songs is the seventh studio album by Dean Martin for Capitol Records, released in 1962. The sessions producing this album's songs were recorded between September 6 and September 8 of 1961. Dino: Italian Love Songs was released on February 5, 1962 (see 1962 in music). The backing orchestra was conducted and arranged by Gus Levene. The original album consisted of twelve songs with distinct Italian themes.

== Track listing ==
=== LP ===
Capitol Records Catalog Number (S) T-1659

==== Side A ====
| Track | Song title | Written by | Recording date | Session information | Time |
|---|---|---|---|---|---|
| 1. | "Just Say I Love Her (Dicitencello Vuie)" | Jack Val, Jimmy Dale, Martin Kalmanoff and Sam Ward | September 7, 1961 | Session 10276; Master 36542 | 2:47 |
| 2. | "Arrivederci Roma" | Renato Rascel and Carl Sigman | September 6, 1961 | Session 10274; Master 36411 | 2:41 |
| 3. | "My Heart Reminds Me" | Camillo Bargoni, Paul Siegel and Al Stillman | September 8, 1961 | Session 10278; Master 36454 | 2:28 |
| 4. | "You're Breaking My Heart (Mattinata)" | Ruggero Leoncavallo, Pat Genaro and Sunny Skylar | September 7, 1961 | Session 10276; Master 36449 | 2:45 |
| 5. | "Non Dimenticar (Don't Forget)" | Michele Galdieri, Shelly Dobbins and P.G. Redi | September 6, 1961 | Session 10274; Master 36443 | 3:05 |
| 6. | "Return To Me (Ritorna a Me)" | Danny Di Minno and Carmen Lombardo | September 6, 1961 | Session 10274; Master 36436 | 2:44 |

==== Side B ====
| Track | Song title | Written by | Recording date | Session information | Time |
|---|---|---|---|---|---|
| 1. | "Vieni Su" | Johnny Cola | September 8, 1961 | Session 10278; Master 35455 | 2:26 |
| 2. | "On an Evening in Roma (Sott'er Celo de Roma)" | Sandro Taccani, Umberto Bertini and Nan Fredricks | September 7, 1961 | Session 10276; Master 36450 | 2:28 |
| 3. | "Pardon (Perdoname)" | Carmen Lombardo and Danny DiMinno | September 7, 1961 | Session 10276; Master 36451 | 3:00 |
| 4. | "Take Me in Your Arms (Torna a Surriento)" | adaptation by Joseph J. Lilley | September 8, 1961 | Session 10278; Master 36453 | 2:38 |
| 5. | "I Have But One Heart | Johnny Farrow and Marty Symes | September 6, 1961 | Session 10274; Master 36444 | 3:02 |
| 6. | "There's No Tomorrow (O Sole Mio)" | Eduardo di Capua, Al Hoffman, Leo Corday and Leon Carr | September 6, 1961 | Session 10274; Master 364828 | 2:48 |

=== Compact Disc ===
1997 EMI/Capitol combined Dino: Italian Love Songs with Cha Cha de Amor (also from 1962). Catalog Number 7243 8 55393 2 9.

==== 2005 Collectors' Choice Music reissue added four more tracks to the twelve tracks on the original Capitol LP. Catalog Number WWCCM06052. ====
| Track | Song title | Written by | Recording date | Session information | Time |
|---|---|---|---|---|---|
| 1. | "Bella, Bella Bambina" | Adolph (Bernice) Ross and Addy Baron | | | 2:34 |
| 2. | "Giuggiola" | Nisa / Sammy Cahn and Corrado Lojacono | | | 2:07 |
| 3. | "Simpatico" | Arthur Schwartz and Sammy Cahn | April 25, 1955 | Session 3755; Master 13743-7 | 2:52 |
| 4. | "Belle from Barcelona" | Dante de Paulo and Louis Yule Brown | April 20, 1954 | Session 3402; Master 12571-6 | 2:48 |

== Personnel ==
- Dean Martin – vocals
- Robert F. Bain – guitar
- Alton R. Hendrickson – guitar
- Allan J. Reuss – guitar
- Murray Shapinsky – bass
- Nick Fatool – drums
- Louis 'Lou' Singer – drums
- Kermit 'Ken' Lane – piano
- Carl L. Fortina – accordion
- Justin DiTullio – cello
- Armand Kaproff – cello (Session 10276 and 10278)
- Raphael Kramer – cello (Sessions 10274 and 10278)
- Edgar Lustgarten – cello (Sessions 10274 and 10276)
- Kurt Reher – cello (Session 10274)
- Ann Mason Stockton – harp
- Joseph DiFiore – viola (Session 10278)
- Alvin Dinkin – viola (Sessions 10274 and 10276)
- Allan Harshman – viola (Session 10274)
- Louis Kievman – viola (Sessions 10276 and 10278)
- Virginia Majewski – viola
- Paul Robyn – viola
- Victor Arno – violin
- Israel Baker – violin
- Kurt Dieterle – violin
- Jacques Gasselin – violin (Sessions 10276 and 10278)
- James Getzoff – violin (Sessions 10274 and 10278)
- Ben Gill – violin (Sessions 10274 and 10278
- Anatol Kaminsky – violin
- Nathan Kaproff – violin
- Joseph Livoti – violin
- Daniel Lube – violin
- Lou Raderman – violin (Sessions 10274 and 10276)
- Mischa Russell – violin (Sessions 10276 and 10278)
- Marshall Sosson – violin (Session 10274)
- Harry Zagon – violin
