= On an Evening in Roma =

1959 single by Dean Martin

- Finnish release picture sleeve

Single by Dean Martin
- B-side: "You Can't Love 'Em All"
- Released: June 1959
- Genre: Traditional pop
- Length: 2:23
- Label: Capitol
- Composer: Alessandro Taccani
- Lyricists: Nan Frederics; Umberto Bertini

Dean Martin singles chronology
"Rio Bravo" (1959)	"On an Evening in Roma" (1959)	"I Ain't Gonna Lead This Life No More" (1959)

"On an Evening in Roma" is a 1959 single by Dean Martin. The song spent 13 weeks on the Billboard Hot 100 chart, peaking at No. 59, while reaching No. 36 on the Cash Box Top 100, and No. 31 on Canada's CHUM Hit Parade.

"On an Evening in Roma" is an adaptation of "Sott'er celo de Roma" (Romanesco dialect for "Under the Sky of Rome"), an Italian song written by Alessandro "Sandro" Taccani and Umberto Bertini, originally performed by Teddy Reno with Gianni Ferrio's orchestra and released in 1957. The song has been recorded in several languages.

== Chart performance ==
Chart (1959)	Peak position
Canada (CHUM Hit Parade)	31
US Billboard Hot 100	59
US Cash Box Top 100	36
US Cash Box Records Disk Jockeys Played Most	45

== Notable versions ==
- 1958: "Sott'er celo de Roma" (Italian) by Achille Togliani
- 1959: "Sous le beau ciel de Rome" (French) by Luis Mariano with Jacques-Henry Rys' orchestra
- 1959: "Ilta tullut on Roomaan" (Finnish) by Eila Pellinen
- 1959: "Under Roms stjärnhimmel" (Swedish) by Carli Tornehave with Bengt-Arne Wallin's orchestra
- 1960: "In den Straßen von Roma" (German) by Fred Bertelmann with Die Hansen-Boys und Girls and Berlipp's Band
- 2000: "Ilta tullut on Roomaan" (Finnish) by Kari Tapio
- 2016: "On an Evening in Roma" (English) by Michael Bublé
