= You're Nobody till Somebody Loves You =

1944 song by Russ Morgan and others

Song by Russ Morgan's orchestra
- Published: 1944
- Genre: Pop
- Length: 3:21
- Songwriters: Russ Morgan, Larry Stock, James Cavanaugh

"You're Nobody till Somebody Loves You" is a popular song written by Russ Morgan, Larry Stock, and James Cavanaugh and published in 1944. The song was first recorded by Morgan and was a hit for him in 1946, reaching the No. 14 spot in the charts. The best known version was Dean Martin's, which was released in 1960 and reissued in 1964.

== Dean Martin cover version ==
The best known is the version by Dean Martin, who recorded it for Capitol Records in 1960 (2:13) and Reprise Records in 1964 (1:58). Dean Martin's 1964 version spent 9 weeks on the Billboard Hot 100 chart, peaking at No. 25, while reaching No. 1 on Billboard's Middle-Road Singles chart, and No. 28 on Canada's CHUM Hit Parade. The cover was used as part of the soundtrack in Martin Scorsese's 1995 movie Casino.

=== Certifications ===
Region	Certification	Certified units/sales
United States (RIAA)	Gold	500,000^{‡}
^{‡} Sales+streaming figures based on certification alone.

== Other notable versions ==
Dinah Washington's 1962 single was praised by Billboard magazine. Ray Price covered the song in 1986, and the single peaked at number 60 on the Billboard Hot Country Singles chart. Frank Sinatra and Billy May collaborated to create a notable rendition for Sinatra's 1961's "Swing Along With Me", his second studio album on his own Reprise label.

== See also ==
- List of number-one adult contemporary singles of 1965 (U.S.)
