= Dean Martin =

American singer and actor (1917–1995)

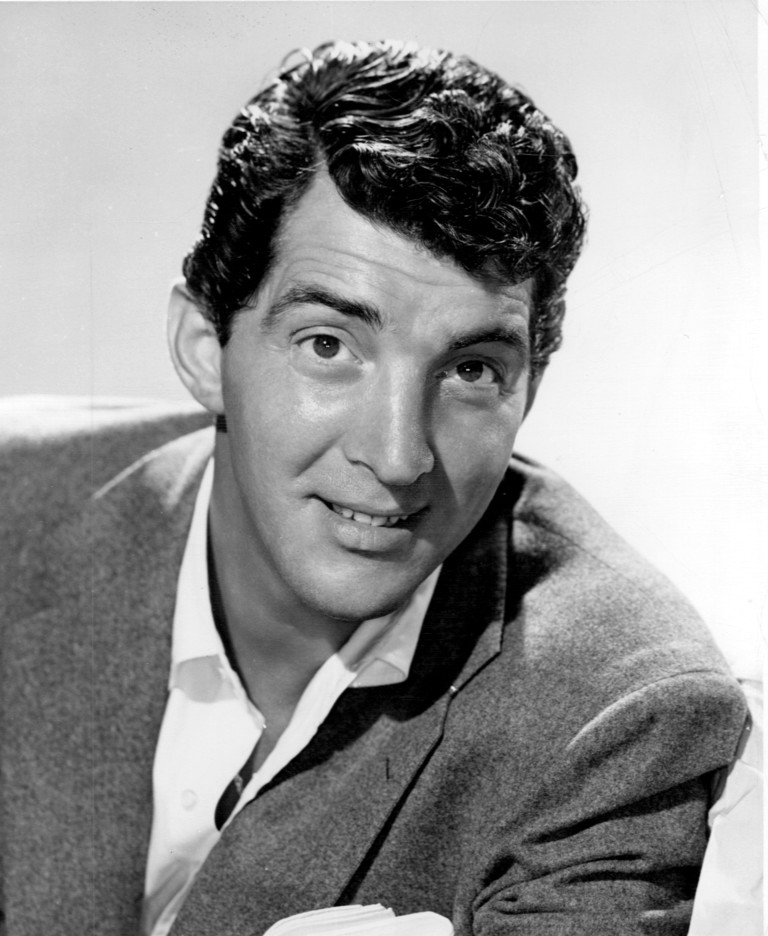
- Martin in 1958
- Born: Dino Paul Crocetti; June 7, 1917; Steubenville, Ohio, U.S.
- Died: December 25, 1995 (aged 78); Beverly Hills, California, U.S.
- Resting place: Westwood Village Memorial Park Cemetery
- Other names: Dino; Dino Martini; "The King of Cool"
- Occupations: Singer; actor; comedian; television personality
- Years active: 1934–1995
- Works: Discography
- Spouses: Betty McDonald (m. 1941; div. 1949); Jeanne Biegger (m. 1949; div. 1973); Catherine Hawn (m. 1973; div. 1976)
- Children: 8, including Deana, Dean Paul, and Ricci
- Relatives: Leonard Barr (uncle); Carl Wilson (son-in-law)
- Musical career
- Genres: Traditional pop; country; easy listening; jazz; swing
- Instrument: Vocals
- Labels: Capitol; Reprise
- Formerly of: Rat Pack

Dean Martin (born Dino Paul Crocetti; June 7, 1917 – December 25, 1995) was an American singer, actor, comedian and television personality. Nicknamed "The King of Cool", he is regarded as one of the most popular entertainers of the 20th century.

Martin gained his career breakthrough together with comedian Jerry Lewis, billed as Martin and Lewis, in 1946. They performed in nightclubs and later had numerous appearances on radio and television and in films. Following an acrimonious ending of the partnership in 1956, Martin pursued a solo career as a performer and actor. He established himself as a singer, recording numerous contemporary songs as well as standards from the Great American Songbook. Martin became one of the most popular acts in Las Vegas and was known for his friendship with fellow artists Frank Sinatra and Sammy Davis Jr., who together with several others formed the Rat Pack.

Starting in 1965, Martin was the host of the television variety program The Dean Martin Show, which centered on Martin's singing and comedic talents and was characterized by his relaxed, easy-going demeanor. From 1974 to 1984, Martin was roastmaster on The Dean Martin Celebrity Roast, a popular show that drew celebrities, comedians and politicians. Throughout his career, Martin performed on concert stages, in nightclubs and audio recordings and appeared in 85 film and television productions and sold 12 million records in the United States alone, over 50 million worldwide. Martin's best-known songs include "Ain't That a Kick in the Head?", "Memories Are Made of This", "That's Amore", "Everybody Loves Somebody", "You're Nobody till Somebody Loves You", "Sway", and "Volare".

== Early life ==
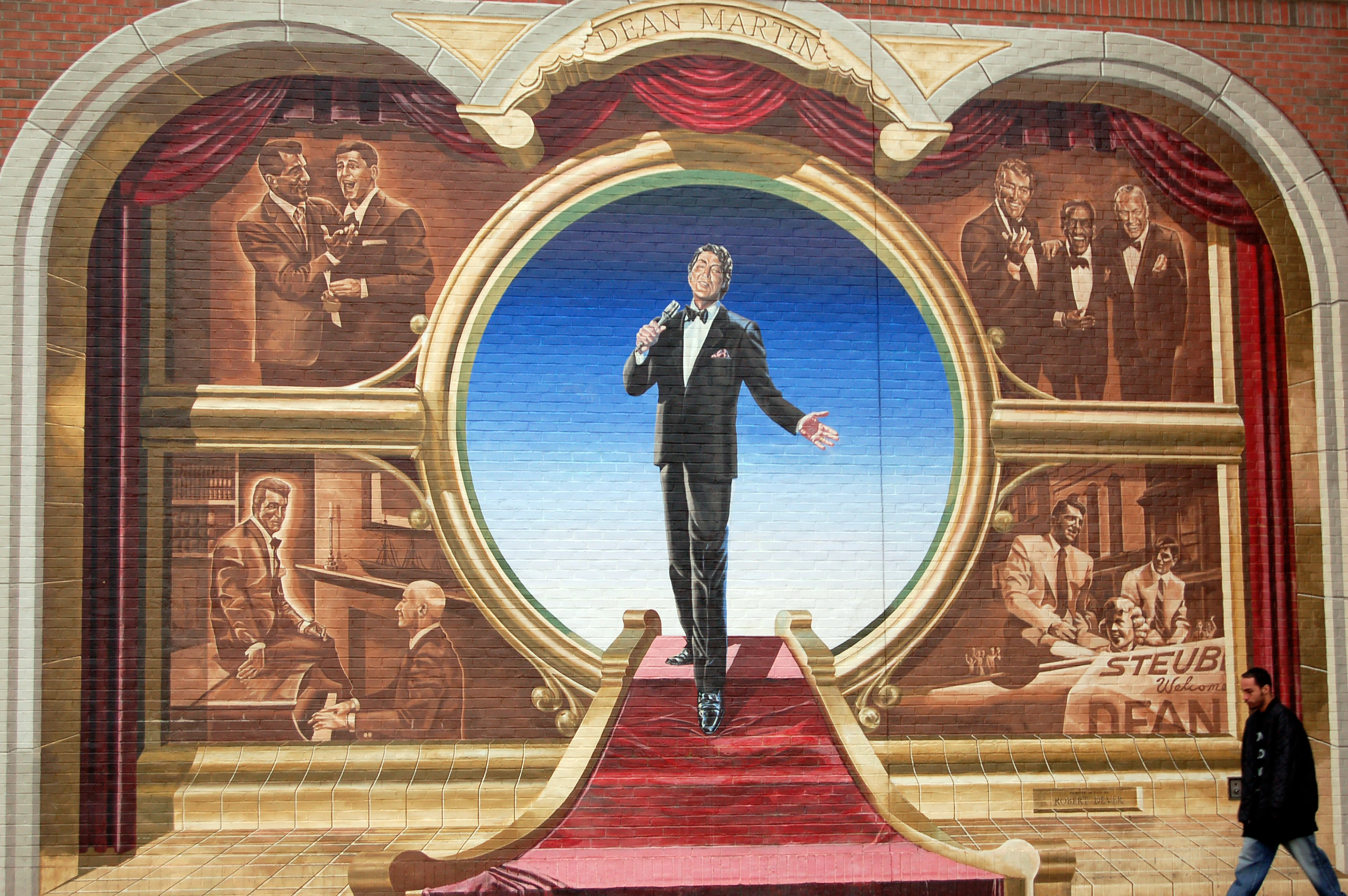
Mural of Dean Martin in Steubenville, Ohio

Martin was born Dino Paul Crocetti on June 7, 1917, in Steubenville, Ohio, to Italian father Gaetano Alfonso Crocetti (1894–1967) and Italian-American mother Angela Crocetti (née Barra; 1897–1966). Gaetano, who was a barber, was originally from Montesilvano, Pescara, Abruzzo and Angela was born December 18, 1897, in Fernwood, Ohio. Angela's father, Domenico Barra, emigrated from Monasterolo, Bergamo. Martin had an older brother Guglielmo "William" Antonio Crocetti (1916–1968). At 15, Martin billed himself as "Kid Crochet". His prizefighting earned him a broken nose (later straightened), a scarred lip, many broken knuckles (a result of not being able to afford tape used to wrap boxers' hands), and a bruised body. Of his 12 bouts, Martin said that he "won all but 11." For a time, he shared a New York City apartment with Sonny King, who was also starting in show business and had little money. The two reportedly charged people to watch them bare-knuckle box each other in their apartment, fighting until one was knocked out. Martin knocked out King in the first round of an amateur boxing match. Martin gave up boxing to work as a roulette stickman and croupier in an illegal casino behind a tobacco shop, where he had started as a stock boy. At the same time, he sang with local bands, calling himself "Dino Martini" (after the Metropolitan Opera tenor Nino Martini). Martin got his break working for the Ernie McKay Orchestra. He sang in a crooning style influenced by Harry Mills of The Mills Brothers and Perry Como. By late 1940, Martin had begun singing for Cleveland bandleader Sammy Watkins, who suggested he change his name to Dean Martin. He stayed with Watkins until at least May 1943. By fall 1943, Martin had begun performing in New York. He was drafted into the U.S. Army during World War II but was discharged after 14 months due to a hernia.

In October 1941, Martin married Elizabeth "Betty" Anne McDonald in Cleveland, and the couple had an apartment in Cleveland Heights for a while. They eventually had four children before divorcing in 1949.

== Career ==
=== Teaming with Jerry Lewis ===
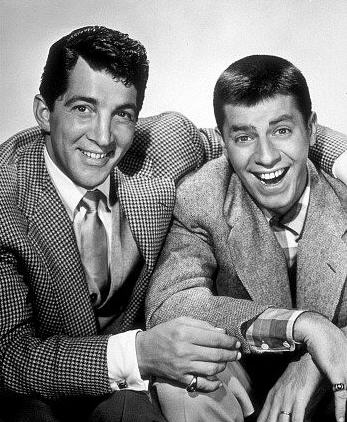
Martin with Jerry Lewis in 1950

Martin attracted the attention of Metro-Goldwyn-Mayer and Columbia Pictures, but a Hollywood contract was not forthcoming. Martin met comic Jerry Lewis at the Belmont Plaza Hotel in New York City in August 1944. According to Lewis, the two men met initially in the lobby, where Martin approached him and said, "Hey, I saw your act, you're a funny kid." Martin was singing at the hotel's famous Glass Hat Club at the time and the two happened to be on the same bill. Martin and Lewis formed a fast friendship which led to their participation in each other's acts and the formation of a music-comedy team.

Their debut together occurred at Atlantic City's 500 Club on July 24, 1946, and they were not well received. The owner, Skinny D'Amato, warned them that if they did not come up with a better act for their second show that night, they would be fired. Huddling in the alley behind the club, Lewis and Martin agreed to "go for broke", they divided their act between songs, skits, and ad-libbed material. Martin sang and Lewis dressed as a busboy, dropping plates and making a shambles of Martin's performance and the club's decorum until Lewis was chased from the room as Martin pelted him with bread rolls. They performed slapstick, reeled off old vaudeville jokes and did whatever else popped into their heads.

This success led to a series of well-paying engagements on the Eastern seaboard, culminating in a run at New York's Copacabana. The act consisted of Lewis interrupting and heckling Martin while he was trying to sing, with the two ultimately chasing each other around the stage. The secret, both said, is that they ignored the audience and played to each other.

The duo made their television debut on the first broadcast of CBS-TV network's The Ed Sullivan Show (then called The Toast of The Town) on June 20, 1948, with composers Rodgers and Hammerstein also appearing.

Hoping to improve their act, the two hired young comedy writers Norman Lear and Ed Simmons to write their bits. With the assistance of both Lear and Simmons, the two would take their act beyond nightclubs.

A radio series began in 1949, the year Martin and Lewis signed with Paramount producer Hal B. Wallis as comedy relief for the movie My Friend Irma. Their agent, Abby Greshler, negotiated one of Hollywood's best deals: although they received only $75,000 between them for their films with Wallis, Martin and Lewis were free to do one outside film a year, which they would co-produce through their own York Productions.

They also controlled their club, record, radio, and television appearances, and through these they earned millions of dollars. In Dean & Me, Lewis calls Martin one of the great comic geniuses of all time. They were friends, as well, with Lewis acting as best man when Martin remarried in 1949.

But harsh comments from critics, as well as frustration with the similarity of Martin and Lewis movies, which producer Hal Wallis refused to change, led to Martin's dissatisfaction. Martin soldiered on during the production of the Martin & Lewis feature 3 Ring Circus (1954), when a publicity photo of Martin, Lewis, and actress Sheree North was published on the cover of Look magazine. Martin was shocked to see Lewis and North pictured but Martin cropped off the page.

The team's publicity manager, Jack Keller, remembered Martin walking on the set "with a copy of Look and he threw it right in my face and called me every vile name he could think of." Lewis recalled Martin "saying he was fed up to the ears playing a stooge. One morning he arrived an hour late on the set and stared daggers at me. 'Anytime you wanta call it quits, just let me know.'" Martin was chagrined by the situation: "Why the hell should I come in on time? There's not a damn thing for me to do."

In later years, Martin reflected on the working conditions during 3 Ring Circus: "There was no sense of me being in that picture at all. The picture was on 35 minutes before I sang one song. Then it was an old one, 'It's a Big, Wide Wonderful World', and I sang it to animals."

Martin lived up to his contract and remained with Lewis until the agreement expired on July 25, 1956, ten years to the day from the first teaming.

=== Solo career ===
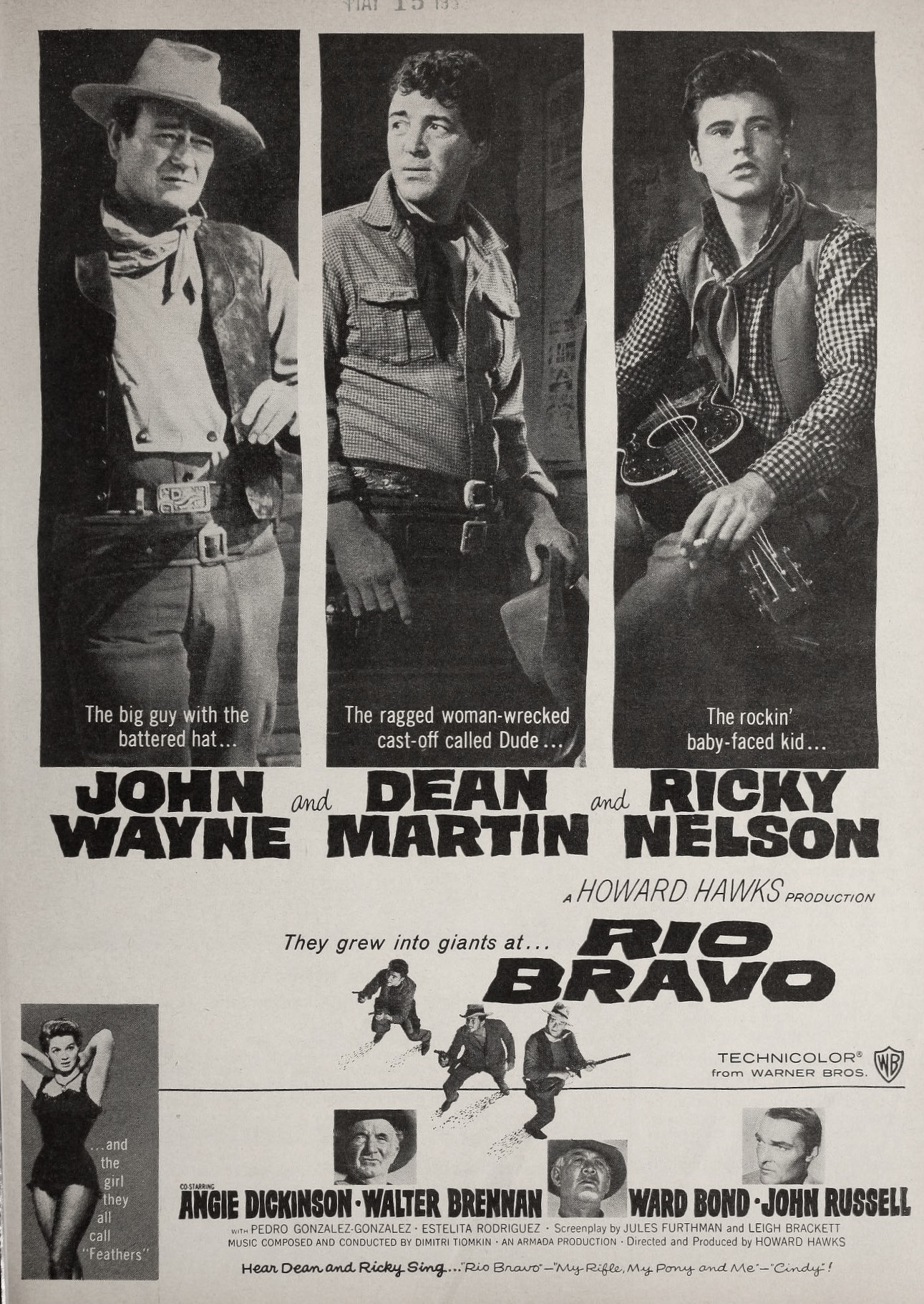
Theatrical poster

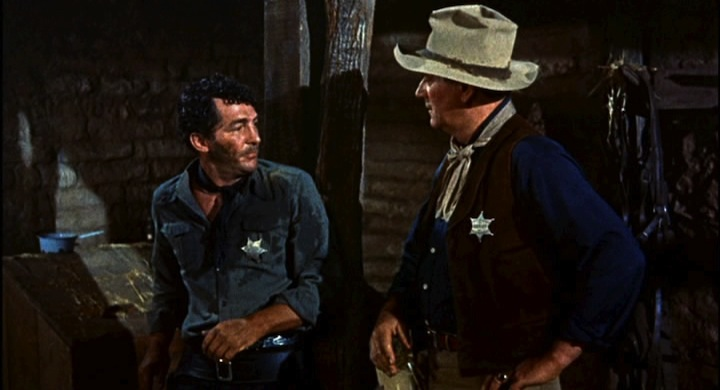
With John Wayne in Rio Bravo (1959)

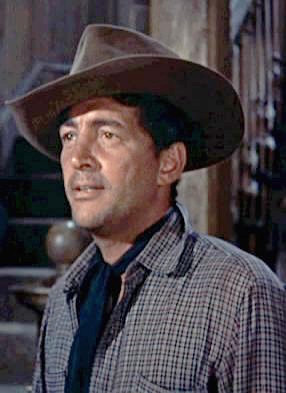
Rio Bravo (1959)

Martin's first solo film, Ten Thousand Bedrooms (1957), was a box-office failure. Although "Volare" reached number 15 in the U.S. and number 2 in the UK, the era of the pop crooner was waning with the advent of rock and roll. Martin wanted to become a dramatic actor, known for more than slapstick comedy films. Though offered a fraction of his former salary to co-star in a war drama, The Young Lions (1958), Martin accepted the part, co-starring with Marlon Brando and Montgomery Clift. Tony Randall already had the part, but talent agency MCA realized that with this film, Martin would become a triple threat: they could make money from his work in nightclubs, films, and records. Randall was paid off to relinquish the role, Martin replaced him and the film turned out to be the beginning of Martin's comeback. He starred alongside Frank Sinatra for the first time in the Vincente Minnelli drama, Some Came Running (1958).

By the mid-1960s, Martin was a movie, recording, television, and nightclub star. He was known as Dude in Rio Bravo (1959), directed by Howard Hawks and also starring John Wayne and singer Ricky Nelson. Martin teamed again with Wayne in The Sons of Katie Elder (1965), cast as brothers. In 1960, Martin was cast in the film version of the Judy Holliday stage musical comedy Bells Are Ringing. He won a Golden Globe nomination for his performance in the 1960 film comedy Who Was That Lady?, but continued to seek dramatic roles, portraying a Southern politician in 1961's Ada, and starring in 1963's screen adaptation of an intense stage drama, Toys in the Attic, opposite Geraldine Page, as well as in 1970's drama Airport with Burt Lancaster, a huge box-office success.

Sinatra and Martin teamed up for several more movies, the crime caper Ocean's 11, the musical Robin and the 7 Hoods, and the Western comedies Sergeants 3 and 4 for Texas, with their Rat Pack pals such as Sammy Davis Jr., Peter Lawford, and Joey Bishop, as well as a romantic comedy, Marriage on the Rocks. Martin also co-starred with Shirley MacLaine in a number of films, including Some Came Running, Artists and Models, Career, All in a Night's Work, and What a Way to Go! He played a satiric variation of his own womanizing persona as Las Vegas singer "Dino" in Billy Wilder's comedy Kiss Me, Stupid (1964) with Kim Novak, and Martin poked fun at his image in films such as the Matt Helm spy spoofs of the 1960s, in which he was a co-producer. In the third Matt Helm film The Ambushers (1967), Helm, about to be executed, receives a last cigarette and tells the provider, "I'll remember you from the great beyond", continuing sotto voce, "somewhere around Steubenville, I hope".

As a singer, Martin copied the styles of Harry Mills (of the Mills Brothers), Bing Crosby, and Perry Como until he developed his own and could hold his own in duets with Sinatra and Crosby. Like Sinatra, Martin could not read music, but he recorded 35 studio albums and over 550 songs. His signature tune, "Everybody Loves Somebody", knocked the Beatles' "A Hard Day's Night" off number one in the United States in 1964. This was followed by "The Door is Still Open to My Heart", which reached number six that year. Elvis Presley was said to have been a fan of Martin, and patterned his performance of "Love Me Tender" after Martin's style. Martin, like Elvis, was influenced by country music. By 1965, some of Martin's albums, such as Dean "Tex" Martin Rides Again, Houston, Welcome to My World, and Gentle on My Mind, were composed of country and western songs by artists such as Johnny Cash, Merle Haggard, and Buck Owens. Martin hosted country performers on his TV show and was named "Man Of the Year" by the Country Music Association in 1966. The final album of his recording career was 1983's The Nashville Sessions.

The image of Martin as a Vegas entertainer in a tuxedo has been an enduring one. "Ain't That a Kick in the Head?", a song Martin performed in Ocean's 11, did not become a hit at the time, but has enjoyed a revival in the media and pop culture and has been his most frequently played song in media for two decades. For three decades, Martin was among the most popular acts in Las Vegas, where he sang and was a comedian, benefiting from the decade of comedy with Lewis. Martin's daughter, Gail, also sang in Vegas and on many TV shows including his, co-hosting his summer replacement series on NBC. Daughter Deana Martin continues to perform, as did youngest son Ricci Martin until his death in August 2016. Eldest son Craig was a producer on Martin's television show and daughter Claudia was an actress in films such as For Those Who Think Young. Though thought of as promiscuous, Martin spent much time with his family; as second wife Jeanne put it, prior to the couple's divorce, "He was home every night for dinner."

=== Rat Pack ===
As Martin's solo career grew, he and Frank Sinatra became friends. In the late 1950s and early 1960s, Martin and Sinatra, along with friends Joey Bishop, Peter Lawford, and Sammy Davis Jr., formed the Rat Pack, so-called after an earlier group of social friends, the Holmby Hills Rat Pack centered on Humphrey Bogart and Lauren Bacall, of which Sinatra had been a member (The Martin-Sinatra-Davis-Lawford-Bishop group referred to themselves as "The Summit" or "The Clan" and never as "The Rat Pack", although this has remained their identity in popular imagination). The men made films together, formed part of the Hollywood social scene, and were politically influential (through Lawford's marriage to Patricia Kennedy, sister of President John F. Kennedy).

The Rat Pack was legendary for its Las Vegas Strip performances. For example, the marquee at the Sands Hotel might read "DEAN MARTIN—MAYBE FRANK—MAYBE SAMMY". Their appearances were valuable because the city would flood with wealthy gamblers. Their act (always in tuxedo) consisted of each singing individual numbers, duets and trios, along with seemingly improvised slapstick and chatter. In the socially charged 1960s, their jokes revolved around adult themes, such as Sinatra's womanizing and Martin's drinking, as well as Davis's race and religion. Sinatra and Martin supported the civil rights movement and refused to perform in clubs that would not allow black American or Jewish performers. Posthumously, the Rat Pack has experienced a popular revival, inspiring the George Clooney/Brad Pitt Ocean's Trilogy.

=== The Dean Martin Show ===
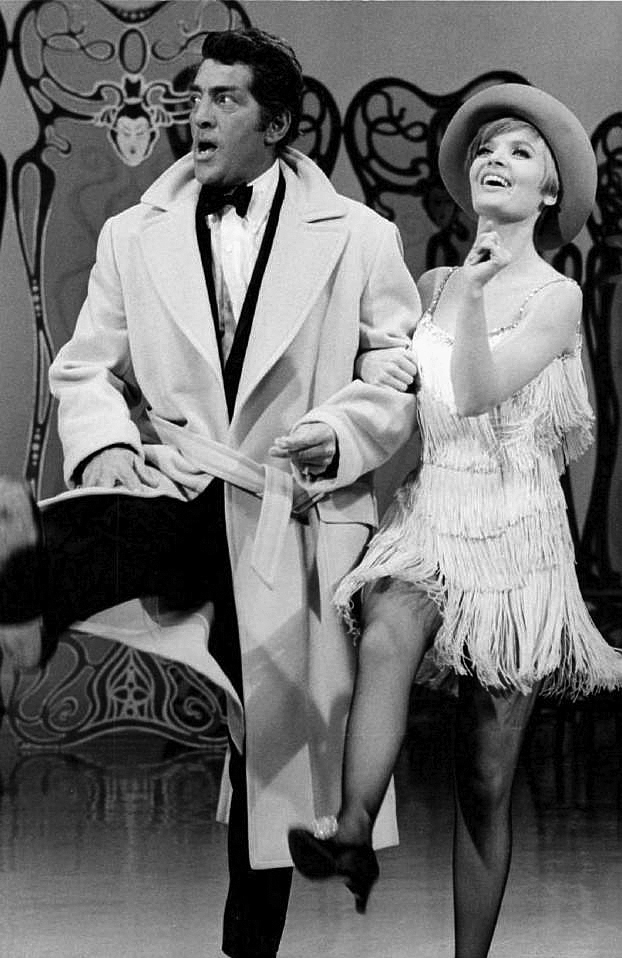
Martin and Florence Henderson on The Dean Martin Show (1968)

In 1965, Martin launched his weekly NBC comedy-variety series, The Dean Martin Show, which ran for 264 episodes until 1974. He won a Golden Globe Award for Best Actor - Television Series Musical or Comedy in 1966 and was nominated again the following three years.

Martin rebelled against the idea of hosting a weekly TV series but the NBC network was persistent. To put a stop to the pressure, Martin laid down a number of conditions that he was certain the network would refuse: he wanted an exorbitant amount of money; he would show up at the studio only on Sundays; he refused to rehearse during the week, leaving special-material creator Lee Hale to stand in for him and block the action with the celebrity guests; he agreed only to one dress rehearsal on Sunday afternoon before taping began at 7:00 p.m.; he declined to memorize any scripts, leaving the production staff to prepare cue cards for him to read during the taping; and he even reserved the right not to sing if he did not feel like it. NBC consented to Martin's conditions. "They should have thrown them in my face, but they agreed to it all," said Martin. "So what the hell, I had to show up!"

The show exploited his image as a carefree boozer. Martin capitalized on his laid-back persona of the half-drunk crooner, inappropriately hitting on women, and making snappy if slurred remarks about fellow celebrities during his roasts. This relaxed behavior was an element of Martin's breezing through the taping; he knew that if he stumbled over a cue-card reading or was momentarily confused by something, he could simply stay in character, cover the mistake with an offhand remark, and move ahead. Colleague Lee Hale insisted that Martin was always professional and prepared. Les Brown's orchestral accompaniments were recorded on cassette tape, so Martin could familiarize himself with the tempos while driving to the studio.

During the first few shows Martin was mostly acting as the master of ceremonies of a variety show, in the manner of popular TV personality Ed Sullivan. "After four of five shows," recalled Hale, "the show was in trouble, and director Greg Garrison thought that involving Dean more might cure all ills." Martin responded with enthusiasm, and took part in the guest-star spots and the comedy sketches. The show reduced the number of variety acts, leaving more room for Martin.

The show's loose format featured quick-witted improvisation from Martin and his weekly guests. This prompted a battle between Martin and NBC censors, who insisted on more scrutiny of the content. He later had trouble with NBC for his off-the-cuff use of obscene Italian phrases, which brought complaints from viewers who spoke the language. The show was often in the top ten. Martin, in appreciation of the show's producer Greg Garrison, made a handshake deal giving Garrison, a pioneer TV producer in the 1950s, 50% of the show. However, the validity of that ownership is the subject of a lawsuit brought by NBCUniversal.

Despite Martin's reputation as a drinker—perpetuated via his vanity license plate "DRUNKY"—his alcohol use was quite disciplined. Martin was the first to call it a night and, when not on tour or on a film location, liked to go home to see his family. Martin borrowed the lovable-drunk shtick from Joe E. Lewis, but his convincing portrayals of heavy boozers in Some Came Running and Howard Hawks' Rio Bravo led to unsubstantiated claims of alcoholism. Martin starred in and co-produced four Matt Helm superspy comedy adventures during this time, as well as a number of Westerns. By the early 1970s, The Dean Martin Show was still earning solid ratings, and although he was no longer a Top 40 hitmaker, his record albums continued to sell. He found a way to make his passion for golf profitable by offering a signature line of golf balls, and the Dean Martin Tucson Open was an event on golf's PGA Tour from 1972 to 1975. At his death, Martin was reportedly the single largest minority shareholder of RCA stock.

Martin began reducing his schedule once comfortable financially. The final (1973–1974) season of his variety show was retooled into one of celebrity roasts, requiring less involvement. In the roasts, Martin and his panel of pals made fun of a variety of popular entertainment, athletic, and political figures. After the show's cancellation, NBC continued to air The Dean Martin Celebrity Roast as a series of TV specials through 1984.

=== Later career ===
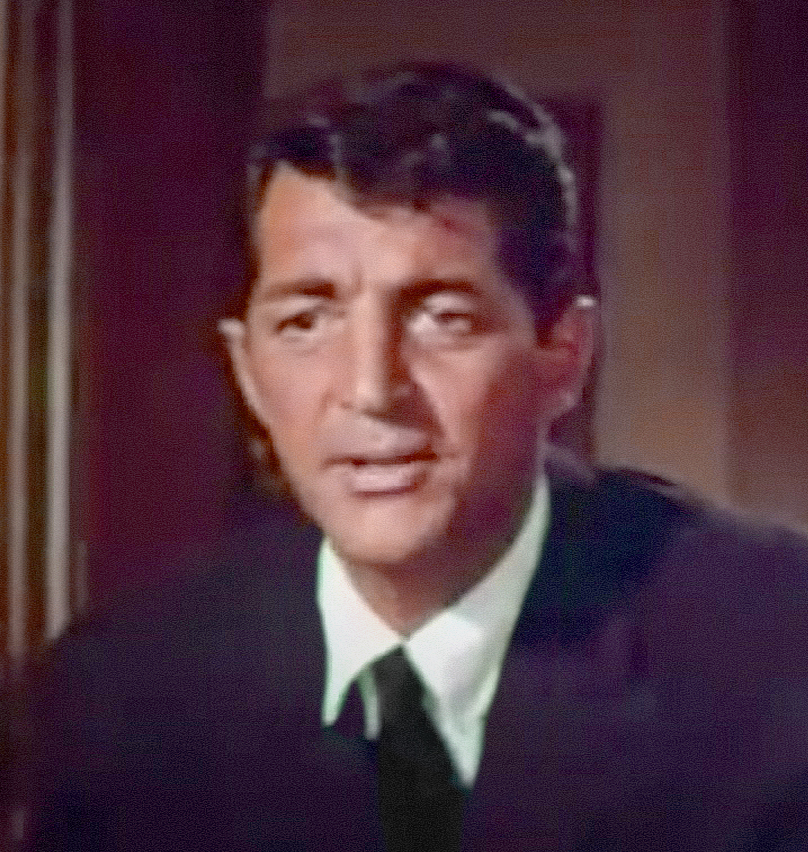
Martin in the film Ada (1961)

For nearly a decade, Martin had recorded as many as four albums a year for Reprise Records. Martin recorded his final Reprise album, Once in a While, in 1974, which was not issued until 1978. His final recordings were made for Warner Bros. Records. The Nashville Sessions was released in 1983, from which he had a hit with "(I Think That I Just Wrote) My First Country Song", which was recorded with Conway Twitty and made a respectable showing on the country charts. A follow-up single, "L.A. Is My Home"/"Drinking Champagne", came in 1985. The 1974 film drama Mr. Ricco marked Martin's final starring role, in which he played a criminal defense lawyer.

In 1972, Martin filed for divorce from his second wife, Jeanne. A week later, his business partnership with the Riviera hotel in Las Vegas dissolved amid reports of the casino's refusal to agree to Martin's request to perform only once a night. Martin joined the MGM Grand Hotel and Casino, where he was the featured performer on the hotel's opening night of December 23, 1973, and Martin's contract required him to star in a film (Mr. Ricco) for Metro-Goldwyn-Mayer studios.

Martin also made a public reconciliation with Lewis on his partner's Labor Day telethon, benefiting the Muscular Dystrophy Association, in September 1976. Sinatra shocked Lewis by bringing Martin out on stage and as the two men embraced, the audience gave them a standing ovation and the phones lit up, resulting in one of the telethon's most profitable years up to that time. Lewis later reported the event was one of the three most memorable of his life. Lewis quipped, "So, you working?" Martin, playing drunk, replied that he was appearing "at the 'Meggum'" (meaning the MGM Grand Hotel). This, with the death of Martin's son Dean Paul Martin more than a decade later, helped bring the two men together. They maintained a quiet friendship, but only performed again once, on Martin's 72nd birthday in 1989.

Martin returned to films briefly with appearances in the star-laden, critically panned but commercially successful The Cannonball Run and its sequel Cannonball Run II. He also had a minor hit single with "Since I Met You Baby" and made his first music video, which appeared on MTV and was created by Martin's youngest son, Ricci. On March 21, 1987, Martin's son, actor Dean Paul Martin (formerly Dino of the 1960s "teeny-bopper" rock group Dino, Desi & Billy), died when his F-4 Phantom II jet fighter crashed while flying with the California Air National Guard. Martin's grief over his son's death left him depressed and demoralized. Lewis stated in an on-stage interview in 2005 that subsequent to his son's death Martin became a reclusive alcoholic. Later, a tour with Davis and Sinatra in 1988, undertaken in part to help Martin recover, sputtered.

== Personal life ==
Martin was married three times. He wed Elizabeth Anne "Betty" McDonald of Ridley Park, Pennsylvania in 1941. The couple had four children including Deana Martin.

Martin then married Dorothy Jean "Jeanne" Biegger, a former Orange Bowl queen from Coral Gables, Florida. They were married for 24 years (1949–1973) and had three children, including Dean Paul Martin and Ricci Martin.

Less than a month after his second marriage was dissolved, Martin, 55, married 26-year-old Catherine Hawn on April 25, 1973. Hawn had been the receptionist at the chic Gene Shacove hair salon in Beverly Hills. Martin and Hawn had no biological children of their own, but Martin adopted Hawn's daughter. They divorced on November 10, 1976. After their divorce, Martin had a brief relationship with model and longtime friend Patricia Sheehan.

Martin was briefly engaged to Gail Renshaw, Miss World–U.S. 1969.

Eventually, Martin reconciled with Biegger, but they never remarried.

Martin's uncle, Leonard Barr, appeared in several of his shows.

In the 1960s and early 1970s Martin lived at 363 Copa De Oro Road in Bel Air, Los Angeles, before selling it to Tom Jones for $500,000 in June 1976 ($2.83 million in 2025).

Martin's son-in-law was the Beach Boys' Carl Wilson, who married Martin's daughter. Actor Kiel Martin was his son-in-law during the former's marriage to Martin's daughter. Figure skater Dorothy Hamill and actress Olivia Hussey were his daughters-in-law during their marriages to Martin's son, Dean Paul Martin. Martin's elder son was married to Lou Costello's daughter until her death from a stroke.

Dean Martin bred Andalusian horses at his Hidden Hills ranch, Thousand Oaks, Ventura County, California.

Martin volunteered to perform fundraisers for the Bergson Group in the late 1940s.

Martin, a Republican, supported Democratic candidate Lyndon B. Johnson in 1964.

In 1982, Martin was stopped on suspicion of drunk driving. No alcohol was detected, but he was arrested for carrying a concealed firearm without a permit. He pleaded guilty and was placed on one year of probation, in addition to a $120 fine.

=== Illness and death ===
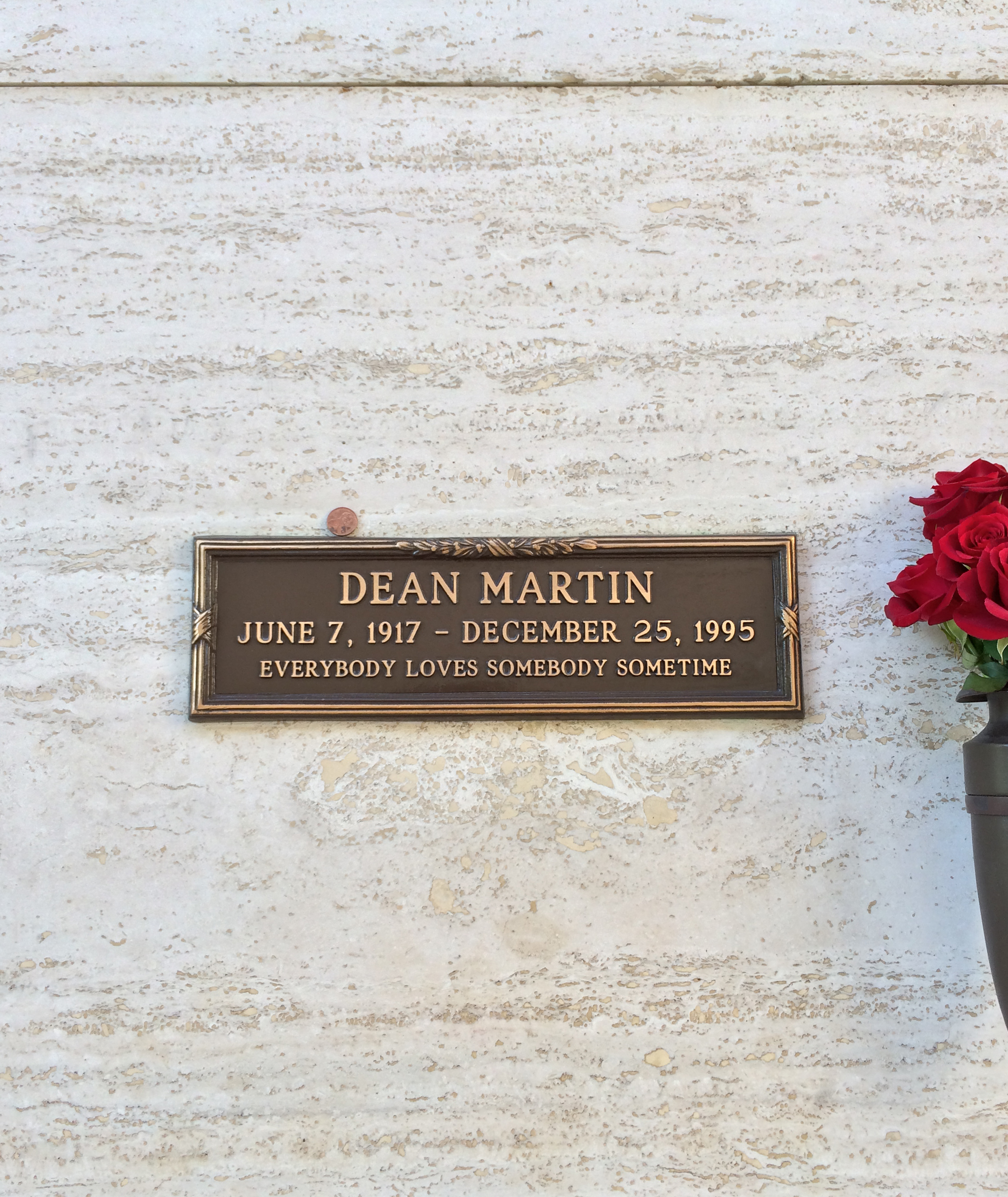
Crypt of Dean Martin, at Westwood Memorial Park

Martin, a lifelong heavy smoker, was diagnosed with lung cancer at Cedars-Sinai Medical Center in September 1993. He was told that he would require surgery to prolong his life, but he rejected it. Martin retired from public life in early 1995 and died of acute respiratory failure resulting from emphysema at his Beverly Hills home on Christmas Day, 1995, at the age of 78. The lights of the Las Vegas Strip were dimmed in his memory. Martin is interred at the Westwood Village Memorial Park Cemetery in Los Angeles. The crypt features the epitaph "Everybody loves somebody sometime", the first line of his signature song.

== Tributes and legacy ==
In 1997, Ohio Route 7 through Steubenville was rededicated as Dean Martin Boulevard. Road signs bearing an Al Hirschfeld caricature of Martin's likeness designate the stretch with a historical marker bearing a small picture and brief biography in the Gazebo Park at Route 7 and North Fourth Street.

The Dean Martin Hometown Festival is held over a long weekend every June in Steubenville. Led by the Dean Martin Association since 2024, impersonators, friends, family, and entertainers, many of Italian ancestry, appear.

In 2005, Clark County, Nevada, renamed a portion of Industrial Road as Dean Martin Drive. A similarly named street was dedicated in 2008 in Rancho Mirage, California.

Martin's family was presented a gold record in 2004 for Dino: The Essential Dean Martin, his fastest-selling album, which also hit the iTunes Top 10, and in 2006 it was certified "Platinum".

There is a street named after Martin in San Antonio, Texas.

For the week ended December 23, 2006, the Dean Martin and Martina McBride duet of "Baby, It's Cold Outside" reached No. 7 on the R&R AC chart. It also went to No. 36 on the R&R Country chart. The last time Martin had a song that high in the charts was in 1965, with the song "I Will", which reached No. 10 on the Pop chart. An album of duets, Forever Cool, was released by Capitol/EMI in 2007. It features Martin's voice with Kevin Spacey, Shelby Lynne, Joss Stone, Big Bad Voodoo Daddy, Robbie Williams, McBride, and others. His footprints were immortalized at Grauman's Chinese Theatre in 1964. Martin has three stars on the Hollywood Walk of Fame: one at 6519 Hollywood Boulevard for movies, the second at 1617 Vine for recordings, and a third at 6651 Hollywood Boulevard for television. In February 2009, Martin was memorialized with a posthumous Grammy Lifetime Achievement Award. Four of his surviving children--Gail, Deana, Ricci, and Gina--accepted it on his behalf. In 2010, Martin received a posthumous star on the Italian Walk of Fame in Toronto, Ontario, Canada.

The town of origin of Dean's father, Montesilvano, dedicated to him a square between via Sarca and via Torrente Piomba and a congress palace called Pala Dean Martin congress center in via Aldo Moro adjacent to the Porto Allegro structure (former cinema Warner).

== In popular culture ==
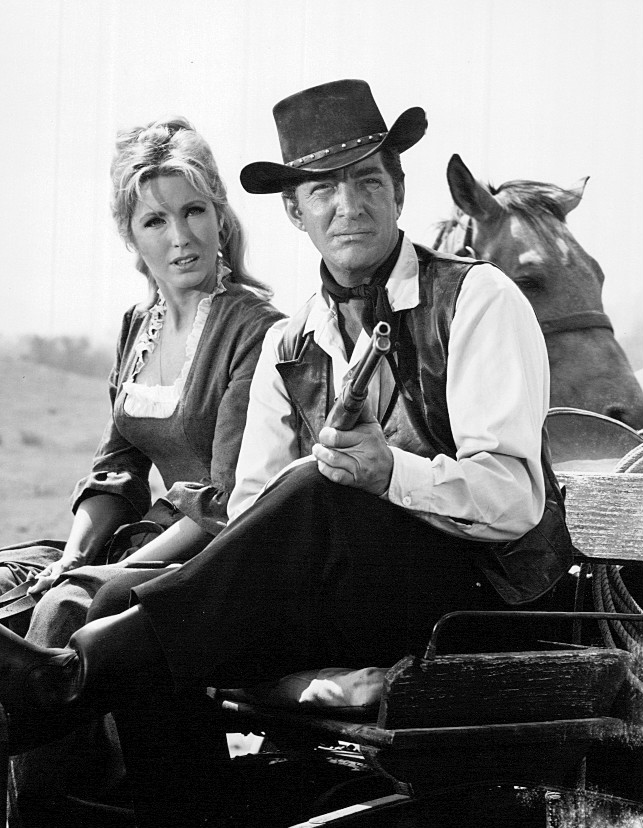
Martin with Laura Devon in Rawhide (1964)

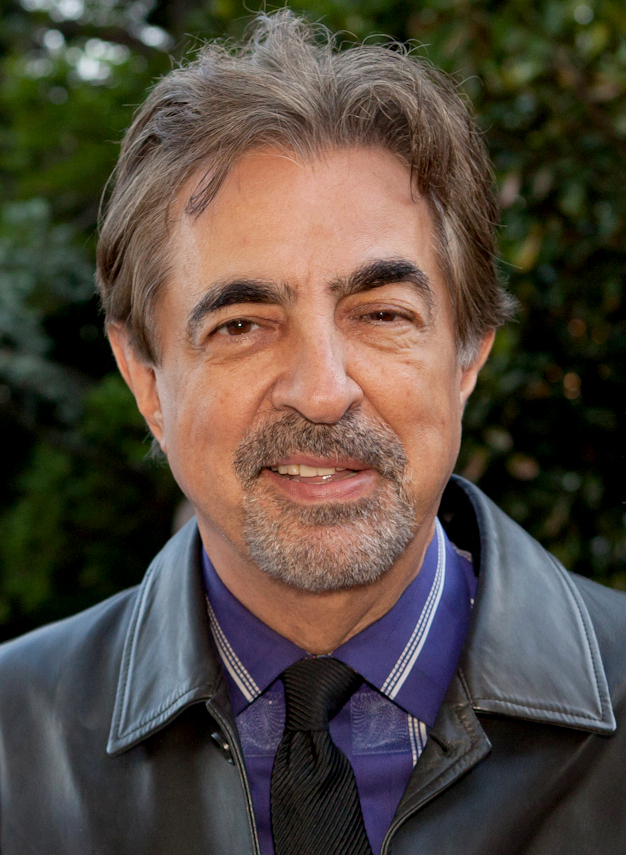
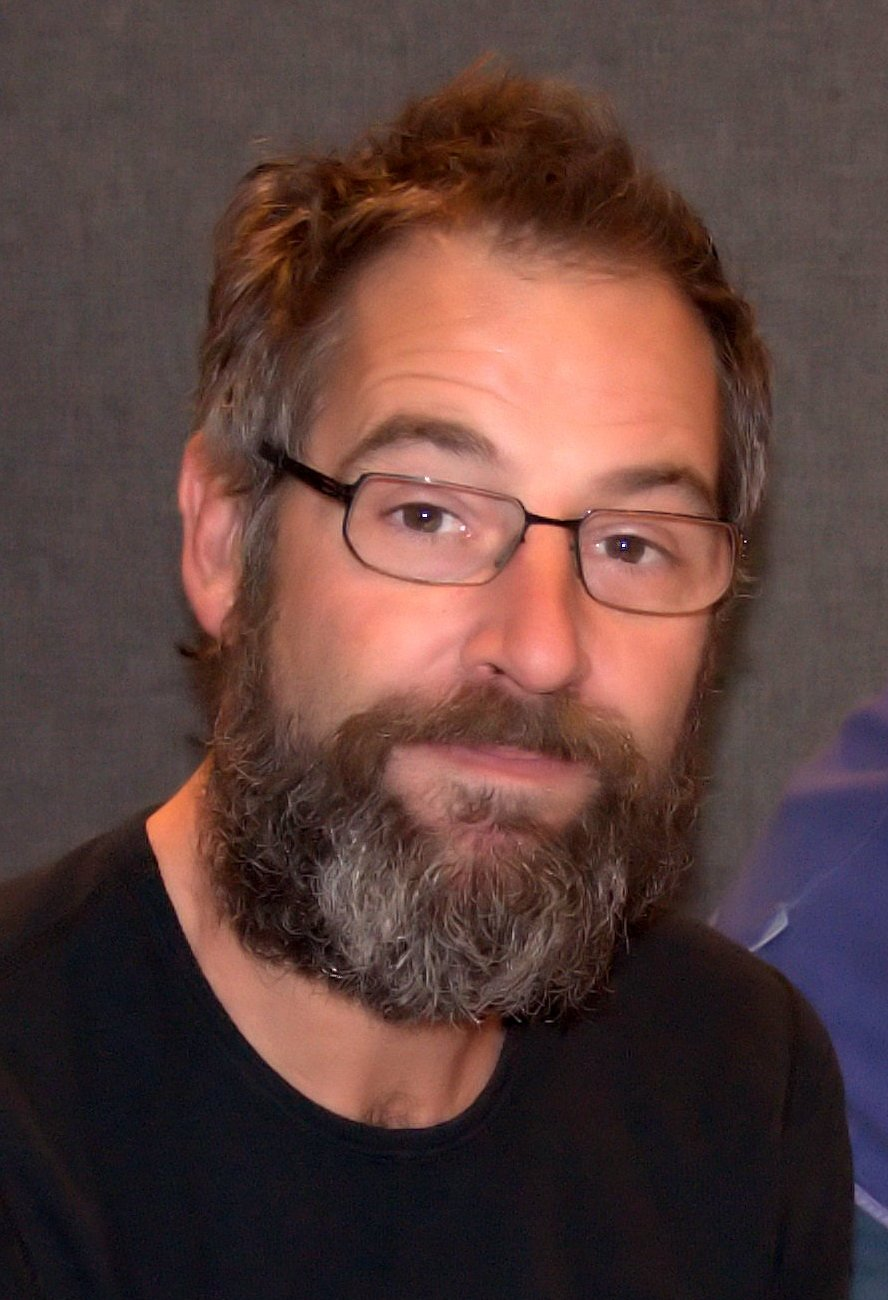
Actor Joe Mantegna (left) received nominations for an Emmy Award and a Golden Globe Award for his portrayal of Dean Martin in the HBO film The Rat Pack (1998). Jeremy Northam (right) received critical acclaim for his portrayal of Martin in the TV film Martin and Lewis (2002).

A number of Martin songs have been featured across popular culture for decades. Hits such as "Ain't That A Kick In the Head", "Good Mornin' Life", "Sway", "You're Nobody Till Somebody Loves You", "That's Amore", and Martin's signature song, "Everybody Loves Somebody", have appeared in films (such as the Oscar-winning Logorama, A Bronx Tale, Casino, Goodfellas, Payback, Mission: Impossible – Ghost Protocol, Sexy Beast, Moonstruck, Vegas Vacation, Swingers, and Return to Me), television series (such as American Dad!, Friends, The Sopranos, Mad Men, House, Samurai Jack, and The Fresh Prince of Bel-Air), video games (such as The Godfather: The Game, The Godfather II, Fallout: New Vegas, and Mafia II), and fashion shows (such as the 2008 Victoria's Secret Fashion Show).

Danny Gans portrayed Martin in the 1992 CBS miniseries Sinatra. Martin was portrayed by Joe Mantegna in the 1998 HBO movie about Sinatra and Martin titled The Rat Pack. Mantegna was nominated for both an Emmy Award and a Golden Globe Award for the role. British actor Jeremy Northam portrayed the entertainer in the 2002 made-for-TV movie Martin and Lewis, alongside Will & Grace's Sean Hayes as Jerry Lewis.

Martin is the subject of Dean Martin's Wild Party and Dean Martin's Vegas Shindig, a pair of video slot machines found in many casinos. The games feature songs sung by Martin during the bonus feature and the count-up of a player's winnings. A compilation album called Amore! debuted at number one on Billboard magazine's Top Pop Catalog Albums chart in its February 21, 2009, issue.

In 1998, the MTV animated show Celebrity Deathmatch had a clay-animated fight to the death between Martin and comedian Jerry Lewis. Martin wins by whacking Jerry out of the ring. The Rat Pack: Live from Las Vegas has been a successful tribute show, featuring Martin impersonators, on stage in Europe and North America since 2000. The popular Las Vegas show, "The Rat Pack is Back" has played The Copa Room at the Tuscany Suites Casino for several years. The walk-up song for Francisco Cervelli, a catcher for the Atlanta Braves, is the Dean Martin tune "That's Amore". In DePatie-Freleng's animated theatrical cartoon series The Ant and the Aardvark, the Ant's voice was performed by John Byner as an imitation of Martin.

Martin appears as Matt Helm in Quentin Tarantino's 2019 period piece Once Upon a Time in Hollywood. Sharon Tate (played by Margot Robbie) goes to a cinema to see The Wrecking Crew.

== Discography ==
The list below shows the singer's studio albums only. His full discography, singles, compilations, and other releases are described in a separate article.

- Dean Martin Sings (1953)
- Swingin' Down Yonder (1955)
- Pretty Baby (1957)
- Sleep Warm (1959)
- A Winter Romance (1959)
- This Time I'm Swingin'! (1960)
- Dino: Italian Love Songs (1962)
- French Style (1962)
- Cha Cha de Amor (1962)
- Dino Latino (1962)
- Dean "Tex" Martin: Country Style (1963)
- Dean "Tex" Martin Rides Again (1963)
- Reprise Musical Repertory Theatre (1963)
- Robin and the 7 Hoods (1964)
- Dream with Dean (1964)
- The Door Is Still Open to My Heart (1964)
- Dean Martin Hits Again (1965)
- (Remember Me) I'm the One Who Loves You (1965)
- Houston (1965)
- Somewhere There's a Someone (1966)
- Dean Martin Sings Songs from "The Silencers" (1966)
- The Hit Sound of Dean Martin (1966)
- The Dean Martin Christmas Album (1966)
- The Dean Martin TV Show (1966)
- Happiness Is Dean Martin (1967)
- Welcome to My World (1967)
- Gentle on My Mind (1968)
- I Take a Lot of Pride in What I Am (1969)
- My Woman My Woman My Wife (1970)
- For the Good Times (1971)
- Dino (1972)
- Sittin' on Top of the World (1973)
- You're the Best Thing That Ever Happened to Me (1973)
- Once in a While (1978)
- The Nashville Sessions (1983)

== Filmography ==
=== Film ===
Year	Film	Role	Notes
1946	Film Vodvil: Art Mooney and Orchestra		Short
1949	My Friend Irma	Steve Laird	Martin and Lewis
1950	My Friend Irma Goes West	Steve Laird	Martin and Lewis
1950	At War with the Army	1st Sgt. Vic Puccinelli	Martin and Lewis
1950	Screen Snapshots: Meet the Winners		Short
1950	Screen Snapshots: Thirtieth Anniversary Special		Short
1951	That's My Boy	Bill Baker	Martin and Lewis
1952	The Stooge	Bill Miller	Martin and Lewis
1952	Sailor Beware	Al Crowthers	Martin and Lewis
1952	Jumping Jacks	Corp. Chick Allen	Martin and Lewis
1952	Road to Bali	Man in Lala's dream	Cameo, Uncredited
1953	Scared Stiff	Larry Todd	Martin and Lewis
1953	The Caddy	Joe Anthony	Martin and Lewis
1953	Money from Home	Herman 'Honey Talk' Nelson	Martin and Lewis
1954	Living It Up	Dr. Steve Harris	Martin and Lewis
1954	3 Ring Circus	Peter 'Pete' Nelson	Martin and Lewis
1955	You're Never Too Young	Bob Miles	Martin and Lewis
1955	Artists and Models	Rick Todd	Martin and Lewis
1956	Screen Snapshots: Hollywood, City of Stars		Short
1956	Pardners	Slim Mosely Jr. / Slim Mosely Sr.	Martin and Lewis
1956	Hollywood or Bust	Steve Wiley	Martin and Lewis
1957	Ten Thousand Bedrooms	Ray Hunter	
1958	The Young Lions	Michael Whiteacre	
1958	Some Came Running	Bama Dillert (professional gambler)	
1959	Rio Bravo	Dude ('Borrachón')	
1959	Career	Maurice 'Maury' Novak	
1960	Who Was That Lady?	Michael Haney	Nominated—Golden Globe Award for Best Actor – Motion Picture Musical or Comedy
1960	Bells Are Ringing	Jeffrey Moss	
1960	Ocean's 11	Sam Harmon	
1960	Pepe	Dean Martin	Cameo
1961	All in a Night's Work	Tony Ryder	
1961	Ada	Bo Gillis	
1962	Sergeants 3	Sgt. Chip Deal	
1962	The Road to Hong Kong	The 'Grape' on plutonium	Cameo, Uncredited
1962	Who's Got the Action?	Steve Flood	
1962	Something's Got to Give	Nicholas 'Nick' Arden	(unfinished)
1963	38-24-36	Self	
1963	Come Blow Your Horn	The Bum	Uncredited
1963	Toys in the Attic	Julian Berniers	
1963	4 for Texas	Joe Jarrett	
1963	Who's Been Sleeping in My Bed?	Jason Steel	
1964	What a Way to Go!	Leonard 'Lennie' Crawley	
1964	Robin and the 7 Hoods	Little John	
1964	Kiss Me, Stupid	Dino	
1965	The Sons of Katie Elder	Tom Elder	
1965	Marriage on the Rocks	Ernie Brewer	
1966	The Silencers	Matt Helm	
1966	Birds Do It	Dean Martin	
1966	Texas Across the River	Sam Hollis	
1966	Murderers' Row	Matt Helm	
1967	Rough Night in Jericho	Alex Flood	
1967	The Ambushers	Matt Helm	
1968	Rowan & Martin at the Movies		Short
1968	How to Save a Marriage and Ruin Your Life	David Sloane	
1968	Bandolero!	Dee Bishop	
1968	5 Card Stud	Van Morgan	
1969	The Wrecking Crew	Matt Helm	
1970	Airport	Capt. Vernon Demerest	
1971	Something Big	Joe Baker	
1973	Showdown	Billy Massey	
1975	Mr. Ricco	Joe Ricco	
1981	The Cannonball Run	Jamie Blake	
1984	Cannonball Run II	Jamie Blake	
1984	Terror in the Aisles		(archival footage)
2019	Once Upon a Time in Hollywood	Himself / Matt Helm	(archival footage from The Wrecking Crew)

=== Television ===
Year	Program	Role	Notes
1950–1955	The Colgate Comedy Hour	Himself	28 episodes
1953–1954	The Jack Benny Program	Himself	Two episodes
1956	Make Room for Daddy	Himself	Episode: "Terry Has a Date"
1957	The Frank Sinatra Show	Himself	Episode 7, aired on November 29, 1957
1958	The Phil Silvers Show	Unnamed Las Vegas Gambler	Episode: "Bilko's Secret Mission"
1958	The Danny Thomas Show	Himself	Episode: "Terry's Crush"
1959	The Frank Sinatra Timex Show	Himself	Television special
1959–1960	The Dean Martin Variety Show	Himself	Two episodes
1962	The Judy Garland Show	Himself	Television special
1964	Rawhide	Gurd Canliss	Episode: "Canliss"
1965–1974	The Dean Martin Show	Himself	264 episodes Won – Golden Globe Award for Best TV Star – Male
1966	The Lucy Show	Himself	Episode: "Lucy Dates Dean Martin"
1967	Movin' with Nancy	Nancy's Fairy Goduncle	Television special
1970	Swing Out, Sweet Land	Eli Whitney	Television special
1971	The Powder Room	Host	Unsold pilot
1973	The Electric Company	Himself	Episode: "223"
1974–1984	The Dean Martin Celebrity Roast	Himself	54 episodes
1975	Lucy Gets Lucky	Himself	Television film
1975	Dean's Place	Himself	Television special
1975	Dean Martin's Christmas in California	Himself	Television special
1976	Dean Martin's Red Hot Scandals of 1926	Himself	2-part television special
1977	Dean Martin's Christmas in California	Himself	Television special
1978	Charlie's Angels	Frank Howell	Episode: "Angels in Vegas"
1978	Dean Martin's Christmas in California	Himself	Television special
1979	The Misadventures of Sheriff Lobo	Himself	Episode: "Dean Martin and the Moonshiners"
1979	Vega$	Himself	Episode: "The Usurper"
1979	Dean Martin's Christmas in California	Himself	Television special
1980	The Dean Martin Christmas Special	Himself	Television special
1981	Dean Martin's Christmas at Seaworld	Himself	Television special
1982	Dean Martin at the Wild Animal Park	Himself	Television special
1985	Half Nelson	Himself	Six episodes
