= List of Billboard Hot 100 top-ten singles in 1964 =

This is a list of singles that have peaked in the top 10 of the Billboard Hot 100 during 1964.

The Beatles scored eleven top ten hits during the year with "I Want to Hold Your Hand", "She Loves You", "Please Please Me", "Twist and Shout", "Can't Buy Me Love", "Do You Want to Know a Secret", "Love Me Do", "P.S. I Love You", "A Hard Day's Night", "I Feel Fine", and "She's a Woman", the most among all other artists. The Beatles became the only act in history to have six number-one songs in a calendar year ("I Want to Hold Your Hand", "She Loves You", "Can't Buy Me Love", "Love Me Do", "A Hard Day's Night" and "I Feel Fine"). The Beatles also became the only act in history to have three consecutive, self-replacing No. 1s, holding the top spot for 14 consecutive weeks across three songs ("I Want to Hold Your Hand" → "She Loves You" → "Can't Buy Me Love").

== Top-ten singles ==
- (#) – 1964 Year-end top 10 single position and rank

Top ten entry date	Single	Artist(s)	Peak	Peak date	Weeks in top ten
Singles from 1963
December 14	"There! I've Said It Again"	Bobby Vinton	1	January 4	9
December 21	"Popsicles and Icicles"	The Murmaids	3	January 11	6
December 28	"Forget Him"	Bobby Rydell	4	January 18	5
December 28	"Talk Back Trembling Lips"	Johnny Tillotson	7	January 4	3
Singles from 1964
January 4	"Quicksand"	Martha and the Vandellas	8	January 4	1
January 4	"The Nitty Gritty"	Shirley Ellis	8	January 11	3
January 4	"Midnight Mary"	Joey Powers	10	January 4	2
January 11	"Surfin' Bird"	The Trashmen	4	January 25	5
January 18	"Out of Limits"	The Marketts	3	February 1	5
January 18	"Hey Little Cobra"	The Rip Chords	4	February 8	6
January 18	"Drag City"	Jan and Dean	10	January 18	2
January 25	"I Want to Hold Your Hand" (#1)	The Beatles	1	February 1	12
January 25	"Um, Um, Um, Um, Um, Um"	Major Lance	5	February 8	6
February 1	"You Don't Own Me"	Lesley Gore	2	February 1	5
February 1	"For You"	Rick Nelson	6	February 15	3
February 1	"Anyone Who Had a Heart"	Dionne Warwick	8	February 15	3
February 8	"She Loves You" (#2)	The Beatles	1	March 21	11
February 15	"Java"	Al Hirt	4	February 29	6
February 15	"What Kind of Fool (Do You Think I Am)"	The Tams	9	February 22	2
February 22	"Dawn (Go Away)"	The Four Seasons	3	February 22	6
February 22	"California Sun"	The Rivieras	5	February 29	4
February 22	"Navy Blue"	Diane Renay	6	March 14	5
February 29	"Please Please Me"	The Beatles	3	March 14	7
February 29	"Stop and Think It Over"	Dale & Grace	8	March 7	2
March 7	"Fun, Fun, Fun"	The Beach Boys	5	March 21	4
March 7	"See the Funny Little Clown"	Bobby Goldsboro	9	March 14	2
March 14	"I Love You More and More Every Day"	Al Martino	9	March 21	2
March 21	"Hello, Dolly!" (#3)	Louis Armstrong	1	May 9	13
March 21	"Twist and Shout"	The Beatles	2	April 4	7
March 28	"Suspicion"	Terry Stafford	3	April 11	7
March 28	"My Heart Belongs to Only You"	Bobby Vinton	9	March 28	2
March 28	"Glad All Over"	The Dave Clark Five	6	April 25	5
April 4	"Can't Buy Me Love"	The Beatles	1	April 4	6
April 4	"The Shoop Shoop Song (It's in His Kiss)"	Betty Everett	6	April 11	3
April 11	"Don't Let the Rain Come Down (Crooked Little Man)"	The Serendipity Singers	6	May 2	6
April 18	"Do You Want to Know a Secret"	The Beatles	2	May 9	5
April 18	"Dead Man's Curve"	Jan and Dean	8	May 9	5
April 25	"Bits and Pieces"	The Dave Clark Five	4	May 2	5
April 25	"My Guy" (#7)	Mary Wells	1	May 16	8
May 2	"Ronnie"	The Four Seasons	6	May 16	4
May 9	"White on White"	Danny Williams	9	May 16	2
May 16	"Love Me Do"	The Beatles	1	May 30	6
May 16	"It's Over"	Roy Orbison	9	May 23	3
May 23	"Chapel of Love"	The Dixie Cups	1	June 6	7
May 23	"A World Without Love"	Peter and Gordon	1	June 27	8
May 23	"Love Me with All Your Heart"	The Ray Charles Singers	3	June 13	6
May 23	"(Just Like) Romeo and Juliet"	The Reflections	6	May 30	3
May 30	"Walk On By"	Dionne Warwick	6	June 13	5
May 30	"Little Children"	Billy J. Kramer with The Dakotas	7	June 13	3
June 6	"P.S. I Love You"	The Beatles	10	June 6	1
June 13	"I Get Around" (#5)	The Beach Boys	1	July 4	9
June 13	"People"	Barbra Streisand	5	June 27	5
June 20	"My Boy Lollipop"	Millie Small	2	July 4	5
June 20	"Don't Let the Sun Catch You Crying"	Gerry and the Pacemakers	4	July 4	5
June 20	"Diane"	The Bachelors	10	June 20	1
June 27	"Memphis"	Johnny Rivers	2	July 11	6
June 27	"Bad to Me"	Billy J. Kramer with The Dakotas	9	June 27	2
July 4	"Rag Doll"	The Four Seasons	1	July 18	7
July 4	"Can't You See That She's Mine"	The Dave Clark Five	4	July 18	4
July 11	"The Girl from Ipanema"	Stan Getz and Astrud Gilberto	5	July 18	4
July 11	"No Particular Place to Go"	Chuck Berry	10	July 11	1
July 18	"The Little Old Lady from Pasadena"	Jan and Dean	3	August 1	5
July 18	"Dang Me"	Roger Miller	7	August 1	4
July 18	"Keep On Pushing"	The Impressions	10	July 18	2
July 25	"A Hard Day's Night"	The Beatles	1	August 1	8
July 25	"Wishin' and Hopin'"	Dusty Springfield	6	August 1	5
August 1	"Everybody Loves Somebody" (#6)	Dean Martin	1	August 15	8
August 1	"Where Did Our Love Go" (#10)	The Supremes	1	August 22	9
August 8	"Under the Boardwalk"	The Drifters	4	August 22	5
August 8	"I Wanna Love Him So Bad"	The Jelly Beans	9	August 8	2
August 15	"The House of the Rising Sun"	The Animals	1	September 5	8
August 15	"C'mon and Swim"	Bobby Freeman	5	August 29	5
August 22	"Because"	The Dave Clark Five	3	September 12	5
August 22	"Walk, Don't Run '64"	The Ventures	8	August 22	2
August 22	"How Do You Do It?"	Gerry and the Pacemakers	9	September 5	3
August 29	"Bread and Butter"	The Newbeats	2	September 19	7
September 5	"G.T.O."	Ronny & the Daytonas	4	September 26	6
September 12	"Oh, Pretty Woman" (#4)	Roy Orbison	1	September 26	8
September 12	"Remember (Walking in the Sand)"	The Shangri-Las	5	September 26	6
September 19	"Do Wah Diddy Diddy"	Manfred Mann	1	October 17	9
September 19	"Dancing in the Street"	Martha and the Vandellas	2	October 17	7
September 26	"It Hurts to Be in Love"	Gene Pitney	7	October 3	4
September 26	"Save It for Me"	The Four Seasons	10	September 26	2
October 3	"We'll Sing in the Sunshine" (#8)	Gale Garnett	4	October 17	6
October 10	"Last Kiss" (#9)	J. Frank Wilson and the Cavaliers	2	November 7	8
October 10	"A Summer Song"	Chad & Jeremy	7	October 17	3
October 17	"Let It Be Me"	Betty Everett and Jerry Butler	5	November 7	5
October 17	"When I Grow Up (To Be a Man)"	The Beach Boys	9	October 17	2
October 24	"Baby Love"	The Supremes	1	October 31	8
October 24	"Have I the Right?"	The Honeycombs	5	November 14	5
October 31	"Little Honda"	The Hondells	9	October 31	1
October 31	"Chug-A-Lug"	Roger Miller	9	November 7	2
November 7	"Leader of the Pack"	The Shangri-Las	1	November 28	5
November 7	"Come a Little Bit Closer"	Jay and the Americans	3	November 21	4
November 7	"The Door Is Still Open to My Heart"	Dean Martin	6	November 14	3
November 14	"Ringo"	Lorne Greene	1	December 5	7
November 14	"She's Not There"	The Zombies	2	December 12	8
November 21	"Time Is on My Side"	The Rolling Stones	6	December 5	6
November 21	"You Really Got Me"	The Kinks	7	November 28	5
November 28	"Mr. Lonely"	Bobby Vinton	1	December 12	9
November 28	"Mountain of Love"	Johnny Rivers	9	December 5	2
December 5	"Come See About Me"	The Supremes	1	December 19	9
December 5	"I'm Gonna Be Strong"	Gene Pitney	9	December 12	3
December 12	"I Feel Fine"	The Beatles	1	December 26	7
December 12	"Dance, Dance, Dance"	The Beach Boys	8	December 19	3
December 19	"Goin' Out of My Head"	Little Anthony and the Imperials	6	December 26	5
December 26	"She's a Woman"	The Beatles	4	December 26	2

=== 1963 peaks ===
List of Billboard Hot 100 top ten singles in 1964 which peaked in 1963
Top ten entry date	Single	Artist(s)	Peak	Peak date	Weeks in top ten
November 23	"Dominique"	The Singing Nun	1	December 7	9
December 7	"Louie Louie"	The Kingsmen	2	December 14	9
December 14	"Since I Fell for You"	Lenny Welch	4	December 28	5

=== 1965 peaks ===
List of Billboard Hot 100 top ten singles in 1964 which peaked in 1965
Top ten entry date	Single	Artist(s)	Peak	Peak date	Weeks in top ten
December 26	"The Jerk"	The Larks	7	January 16	5

== See also ==
- 1964 in music
- List of Billboard Hot 100 number ones of 1964
- Billboard Year-End Hot 100 singles of 1964
