= Billboard Year-End Hot 100 singles of 1964 =

Ranking of recorded music

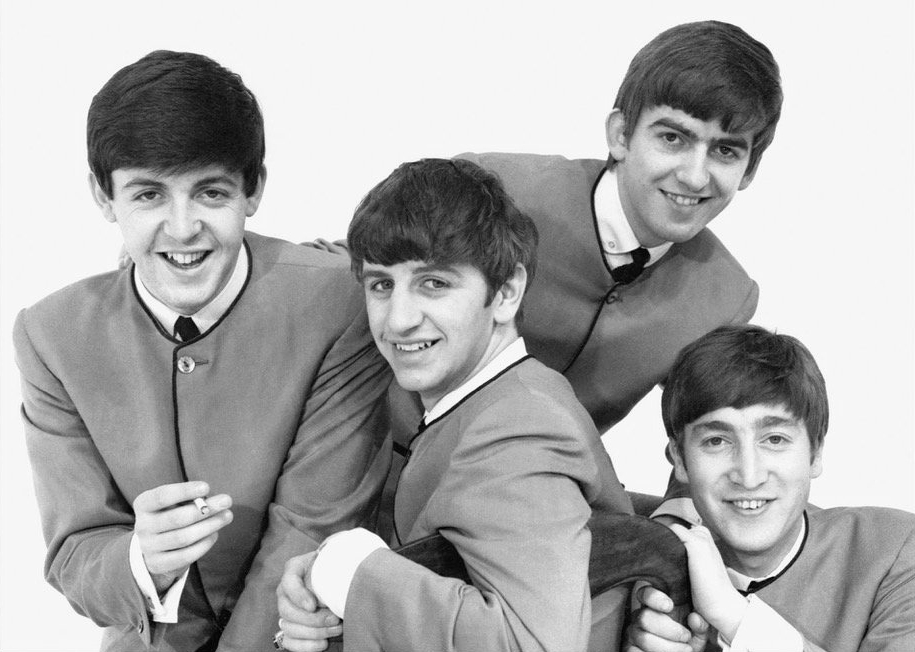
The Beatles had nine songs on the Year End Hot 100, including "I Want to Hold Your Hand" and "She Loves You", the top two songs of 1964.

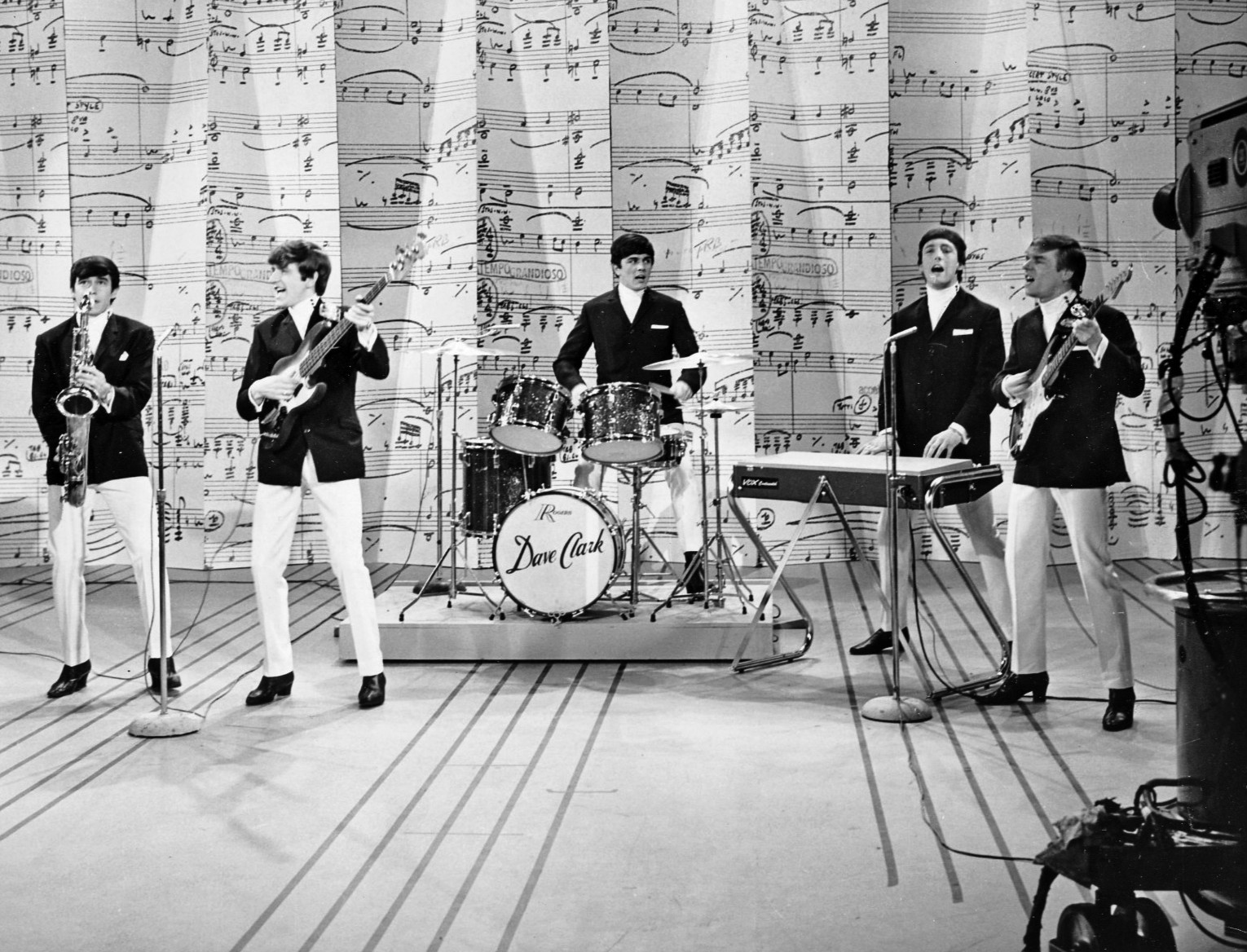
The Dave Clark Five had five songs on the Year-End Hot 100.

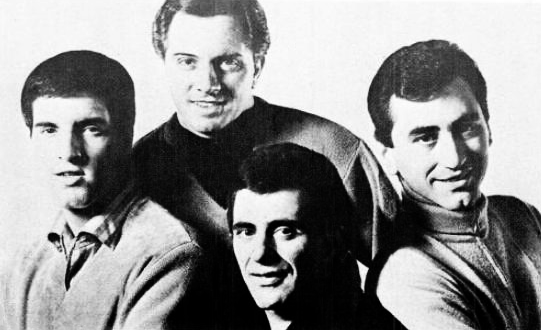
The Four Seasons had three songs on the Year-End Hot 100.

This is a list of Billboard magazine's Top Hot 100 songs of 1964. The Top 100, as revealed in the edition of Billboard dated January 2, 1965, is based on Hot 100 charts from the issue dates of January 4 through December 12, 1964.

No.	Title	Artist(s)
1	"I Want to Hold Your Hand"	The Beatles
2	"She Loves You"	The Beatles
3	"Hello, Dolly!"	Louis Armstrong
4	"Oh, Pretty Woman"	Roy Orbison
5	"I Get Around"	The Beach Boys
6	"Everybody Loves Somebody"	Dean Martin
7	"My Guy"	Mary Wells
8	"We'll Sing in the Sunshine"	Gale Garnett
9	"Last Kiss"	J. Frank Wilson and the Cavaliers
10	"Where Did Our Love Go"	The Supremes
11	"People"	Barbra Streisand
12	"Java"	Al Hirt
13	"A Hard Day's Night"	The Beatles
14	"Love Me Do"	The Beatles
15	"Do Wah Diddy Diddy"	Manfred Mann
16	"Please Please Me"	The Beatles
17	"Dancing in the Street"	Martha and the Vandellas
18	"Little Children"	Billy J. Kramer & The Dakotas
19	"Love Me with All Your Heart (Cuando Calienta El Sol)"	The Ray Charles Singers
20	"Under the Boardwalk"	The Drifters
21	"Chapel of Love"	The Dixie Cups
22	"Suspicion"	Terry Stafford
23	"Glad All Over"	The Dave Clark Five
24	"Rag Doll"	The Four Seasons
25	"Dawn (Go Away)"	The Four Seasons
26	"Bread and Butter"	The Newbeats
27	"It Hurts to Be in Love"	Gene Pitney
28	"Dead Man's Curve"	Jan and Dean
29	"Come a Little Bit Closer"	Jay and the Americans
30	"A World Without Love"	Peter and Gordon
31	"Have I the Right?"	The Honeycombs
32	"Don't Let the Rain Come Down (Crooked Little Man)"	The Serendipity Singers
33	"Baby Love"	The Supremes
34	"Let It Be Me"	Betty Everett & Jerry Butler
35	"Wishin' and Hopin'"	Dusty Springfield
36	"You Don't Own Me"	Lesley Gore
37	"Walk On By"	Dionne Warwick
38	"The House of the Rising Sun"	The Animals
39	"G.T.O."	Ronny & the Daytonas
40	"Twist and Shout"	The Beatles
41	"Memphis"	Johnny Rivers
42	"White on White"	Danny Williams
43	"Hey Little Cobra"	The Rip Chords
44	"The Shoop Shoop Song (It's in His Kiss)"	Betty Everett
45	"Bits and Pieces"	The Dave Clark Five
46	"My Boy Lollipop"	Millie Small
47	"Um, Um, Um, Um, Um, Um"	Major Lance
48	"The Little Old Lady (from Pasadena)"	Jan and Dean
49	"Don't Let the Sun Catch You Crying"	Gerry and the Pacemakers
50	"A Summer Song"	Chad & Jeremy
51	"The Girl from Ipanema"	Stan Getz & Astrud Gilberto
52	"Can't Buy Me Love"	The Beatles
53	"Remember (Walking in the Sand)"	The Shangri-Las
54	"C'mon and Swim"	Bobby Freeman
55	"Do You Want to Know a Secret"	The Beatles
56	"Keep On Pushing"	The Impressions
57	"Baby I Need Your Loving"	Four Tops
58	"Navy Blue"	Diane Renay
59	"Diane"	The Bachelors
60	"Out of Limits"	The Marketts
61	"Little Honda"	The Hondells
62	"Chug-a-Lug"	Roger Miller
63	"See the Funny Little Clown"	Bobby Goldsboro
64	"Because"	The Dave Clark Five
65	"(Just Like) Romeo and Juliet"	The Reflections
66	"For You"	Rick Nelson
67	"Today"	The New Christy Minstrels
68	"Can't You See That She's Mine"	The Dave Clark Five
69	"Leader of the Pack"	The Shangri-Las
70	"Funny How Time Slips Away"	Joe Hinton
71	"The Way You Do the Things You Do"	The Temptations
72	"Anyone Who Had a Heart"	Dionne Warwick
73	"I Love You More and More Every Day"	Al Martino
74	"It's Over"	Roy Orbison
75	"Ronnie"	The Four Seasons
76	"Surfin' Bird"	The Trashmen
77	"What Kind of Fool (Do You Think I Am)"	The Tams
78	"The Door Is Still Open to My Heart"	Dean Martin
79	"You Really Got Me"	The Kinks
80	"The Shelter of Your Arms"	Sammy Davis Jr.
81	"I'm So Proud"	The Impressions
82	"I Wanna Love Him So Bad"	The Jelly Beans
83	"Dang Me"	Roger Miller
84	"Cotton Candy"	Al Hirt
85	"(You Don't Know) How Glad I Am"	Nancy Wilson
86	"Money (That's What I Want)"	The Kingsmen
87	"Don't Throw Your Love Away"	The Searchers
88	"Hi-Heel Sneakers"	Tommy Tucker
89	"How Do You Do It?"	Gerry and the Pacemakers
90	"Walk, Don't Run '64"	The Ventures
91	"Do You Love Me"	The Dave Clark Five
92	"Shangri-La"	Robert Maxwell
93	"Haunted House"	Jumpin' Gene Simmons
94	"Steal Away"	Jimmy Hughes
95	"I Saw Her Standing There"	The Beatles
96	"A Fool Never Learns"	Andy Williams
97	"Bad to Me"	Billy J. Kramer & The Dakotas
98	"There! I've Said It Again"	Bobby Vinton
99	"Louie Louie"	The Kingsmen
100	"Needles and Pins"	The Searchers

== See also ==
- 1964 in music
- List of Billboard Hot 100 number-one singles of 1964
- List of Billboard Hot 100 top-ten singles in 1964
