= 7th Annual Grammy Awards =

1965 US music awards ceremony

- Date: April 13, 1965
- Location: Beverly Hilton Hotel, Beverly Hills

Television/radio coverage
- Network: NBC

The 7th Annual Grammy Awards were held on April 13, 1965, at Beverly Hilton Hotel, Beverly Hills. They recognized accomplishments of musicians for the year 1964. João Gilberto & Stan Getz won 4 awards.

Steve Allen performed monologues throughout the ceremony. Louis Armstrong canceled at the last minute, so they brought in Jimmy Durante to perform his song Hello Dolly! Woody Allen also made an appearance. Sammy Davis Jr. did a tribute to Nat King Cole, who had died of lung cancer on February 15, 1965.

== Performers ==
- Sammy Davis Jr. - Nat King Cole tribute
- Jimmy Durante - Hello, Dolly!

== Presenters ==
- Peter Sellers - Presented The Beatles with their Grammy awards
- Arthur Fiedler

== Award winners ==
The following awards were the winners and nominees of the 7th annual awards ceremony:

- Record of the Year
  - Astrud Gilberto & Stan Getz for "The Girl from Ipanema"
  - Barbra Streisand for "People"
  - The Beatles for "I Want To Hold Your Hand"
  - Louis Armstrong for "Hello, Dolly!"
  - Petula Clark for "Downtown"
- Album of the Year
  - João Gilberto & Stan Getz for Getz/Gilberto
  - Henry Mancini for The Pink Panther
  - Barbra Streisand for People
  - Barbra Streisand for Funny Girl
  - Al Hirt for Cotton Candy
- Song of the Year
  - Jerry Herman (songwriter) for "Hello, Dolly!" performed by Louis Armstrong
  - Leslie Bricusse & Anthony Newley (songwriters) for "Who Can I Turn To?" performed by Anthony Newley
  - Bob Merrill & Jule Styne (songwriters) for "People" performed by Barbra Streisand
  - Ray Evans, Jay Livingston & Henry Mancini (songwriters) for Dear Heart performed by Henry Mancini
  - John Lennon & Paul McCartney (songwriters) for "A Hard Day's Night" performed by The Beatles
- Best New Artist
  - The Beatles
  - Petula Clark
  - Morgana King
  - Antonio Carlos Jobim
  - Astrud Gilberto

=== Children's ===
- Best Recording for Children
  - Julie Andrews, Dick Van Dyke, Glynis Johns, David Tomlinson & Ed Wynn for Mary Poppins
  - Fess Parker for Daniel Boone
  - Burl Ives & Children's Chorus for Burl Ives Chim Chim Cher-ee And Other Children's Choices
  - Hugh Downs, Arthur Fielder and the Boston Pops for Britten: Young Person's Guide To The Orchestra
  - Mary Martin & The Do-Re-Mi Children's Chorus for A Spoonful Of Sugar

=== Classical ===
- Best Performance - Orchestra
  - Erich Leinsdorf (conductor) & the Boston Symphony Orchestra for Mahler: Symphony No. 5/Berg: Wozzeck Excerpts
- Best Vocal Soloist Performance (with or without orchestra)
  - Fritz Reiner (conductor), Leontyne Price & the Chicago Symphony Orchestra for Berlioz: Nuits d'Ete (Song Cycle)/Falla: El Amor Brujo
- Best Opera Recording
  - Herbert von Karajan (conductor) Franco Corelli, Mirella Freni, Robert Merrill, Leontyne Price & the Vienna Philharmonic Orchestra for Bizet: Carmen
- Best Choral Performance (other than opera)
  - Robert Shaw (choir director) & the Robert Shaw Chorale for Britten: A Ceremony of Carols
- Best Performance - Instrumental Soloist or Soloists (with orchestra)
  - Eugene Ormandy (conductor), Isaac Stern & the Philadelphia Orchestra for Prokofiev: Violin Concerto No. 1 in D
- Best Performance - Instrumental Soloist or Soloists (without orchestra)
  - Vladimir Horowitz for Vladimir Horowitz Plays Beethoven, Debussy, Chopin
- Best Chamber Music Performance - Vocal
  - Noah Greenberg (conductor) & the New York Pro Musica for It Was a Lover and His Lass
- Best Chamber Music Performance - Instrumental
  - Jascha Heifetz, Jacob Lateiner & Gregor Piatigorsky for Beethoven: Trio No. 1 in E Flat, Op.1 #1
- Best Composition by a Contemporary Composer
  - Samuel Barber for Concerto performed by John Browning
- Best Classical Album
  - Leonard Bernstein (conductor) & the New York Philharmonic for Bernstein: Symphony No. 3 "Kaddish"
- Most Promising New Classical Recording Artist
  - Marilyn Horne

=== Comedy ===
- Best Comedy Performance
  - Bill Cosby for I Started Out as a Child
  - Woody Allen for Woody Allen
  - Jonathan Winters for Whistle Stopping
  - Godfrey Cambridge Ready Or Not, Here Comes Godfrey Cambridge
  - Allan Sherman for For Swingin' Livers Only!

=== Composing and arranging ===
- Best Instrumental Composition (other than jazz)
  - Henry Mancini (composer) for "The Pink Panther Theme"
- Best Original Score Written for a Motion Picture or Television Show
  - Richard M. Sherman & Robert B. Sherman (composers) for Mary Poppins performed by Julie Andrews, Dick Van Dyke & various artists
- Best Instrumental Arrangement
  - Henry Mancini (arranger) for "The Pink Panther Theme"
- Best Accompaniment Arrangement for Vocalist(s) or Instrumentalist(s)
  - Peter Matz (arranger) for "People" performed by Barbra Streisand

=== Country ===
- Best Country & Western Vocal Performance - Female
  - Dottie West for "Here Comes My Baby"
- Best Country & Western Vocal Performance - Male
  - Roger Miller for "Dang Me"
- Best Country & Western Single
  - Roger Miller for "Dang Me"
- Best Country & Western Song
  - Roger Miller (songwriter) for "Dang Me"
- Best Country & Western Album
  - Roger Miller for Dang Me/Chug-A-Lug
- Best New Country & Western Artist
  - Roger Miller

=== Folk ===
- Best Folk Recording
  - Gale Garnett for We'll Sing in the Sunshine
  - Woody Guthrie for Woody Guthrie: Library Of Congress Recordings
  - The New Christy Minstrels for Today
  - Miriam Makeba for The Voice Of Africa
  - Bob Dylan for The Times They Are A-Changing
  - Peter, Paul and Mary for Peter, Paul And Mary In Concert
  - Harry Belafonte for Belafonte At The Greek Theatre

=== Gospel ===
- Best Gospel or Other Religious Recording (Musical)
  - Tennessee Ernie Ford for Great Gospel Songs
  - Fred Waring and the Pennsylvanians for This I Believe
  - Jo Stafford for Sweet Hour Of Prayer
  - James Cleveland and the Angelic Choir for Standin' On The Banks Of The River
  - George Beverly Shea for Hymns Of Sunrise And Sunset
  - Dominican Nuns of Fichermont for Gregorian Chant
  - Roger Williams for Family Album Of Hymns

=== Jazz ===
- Best Instrumental Jazz Performance - Small Group or Soloist with Small Group
  - Stan Getz for Getz/Gilberto
  - Pete Jolly for Sweet September
  - Andre Previn for My Fair Lady
  - Clark Terry & Oscar Peterson for Mumbles
  - Miles Davis for Miles Davis In Europe
  - The Modern Jazz Quartet with Laurindo Almeida for Collaboration
- Best Instrumental Jazz Performance - Large Group or Soloist with Large Group
  - Laurindo Almeida for Guitar from Ipanema
  - Woody Herman for Woody Herman '64
  - Gil Evans for The Individualism Of Gil Evans
  - Rod Levitt for The Dynamic Sound Patterns Of The Rod Levitt Orchestra
  - Quincy Jones for Quincy Jones Explores The Music Of Henry Mancini
  - Miles Davis & Gil Evans for Quiet Nights
  - Oscar Peterson & Nelson Riddle for Oscar Peterson/Nelson Riddle
  - Shelly Manne for My Fair Lady With The Unoriginal Cast
- Best Original Jazz Composition
  - Lalo Schifrin (composer) for "The Cat"
  - Dave Brubeck (composer & performer) for "Theme From Mr. Broadway"
  - Quincy Jones (composer & performer) for "The Witching Hour"
  - Gerald Wilson (composer & performer) for "Paco"
  - Duke Ellington (composer & performer) for "Night Creature"
  - Bob Florence (composer & performer) for "Here And Now"

=== Musical show ===
- Best Score From an Original Cast Show Album
  - Jule Styne & Robert Merrill (composers) & the original cast (Barbra Streisand, Sydney Chaplin, Danny Meehan, Kay Medford, Jean Stapleton & John Lankston) for Funny Girl
  - Erin Drake (composer) for What Makes Sammy Run? performed by the original cast including Steve Lawrence, Robert Alda, Al Manheim & Sally Ann Howes
  - Timothy Gray & Hugh Martin (composer) for High Spirits performed by original cast including Beatrice Lillie, Tammy Grimes, Edward Woodward & Louise Troy
  - Jerry Herman (composer) for Hello, Dolly! performed by original cast including Carol Channing, David Burns, Charles Nelson Reilly & Eileen Brennan
  - Jerry Bock & Sheldon Harnick (composers) for Fiddler On The Roof performed by original cast including Zero Mostel & Beatrice Arthur

=== Packaging and notes ===
- Best Album Cover - Classical
  - Robert M. Jones (art director) & Jan Balet (graphic artist) for Saint-Saens: Carnival of the Animals/Britten: Young Person's Guide to the Orchestra conducted by Arthur Fiedler
  - Marvin Schwartz (art director) for Verdi: Requiem Mass conducted by Carlo Maria Giulini
  - Robert "Bob" Cato (art director) for Mexico (Legacy Collection) performed by Carlos Chavez
  - David Hecht (photographer) & Robert M. Jones (art director) for Mahler: Symphony No. 5 In C Sharp Minor conducted by Eric Leinsdorf
  - William S. Harvey (art director) for Court And Ceremonial Music Of The 16th Century performed by Roger Blanchard Ensemble With The Poulteau Consort
  - John Berg (art director) for (Richard) Strauss: Also Sprach Zarathustra conducted by Eugene Ormandy
- Best Album Cover - Other Than Classical
  - Robert Cato (art director) & Don Bronstein (photographer) for People performed by Barbra Streisand
  - Bob Cato (art director) for The Sounds Of Harlem, Jazz Odyssey Vol. 3 performed by various artists
  - Ed Thrasher (photographer & art director) for Poitier Meets Plato performed by Sydney Poitier
  - Acy R. Lehman (art director) for Oscar Peterson Plays My Fair Lady performed by Oscar Peterson
  - George Jerman (photographer) & George Osaki (art director) for Guitar From Ipanema performed by Laurindo Almeida
  - Acy R. Lehman (art director) for Getz/Gilberto performed by Stan Getz & Joao Gilberto
- Best Album Notes
  - Stanton Catlin (album notes writer) for Mexico (Legacy Collection) performed by Carlos Chavez
  - George Sponhaltz (notes writer) for The Young Chevalier performed by Maurice Chevalier
  - Rory Guy (notes writer) for The Definitive Piaf performed by Edith Piaf
  - Jack Tracy (notes writer) for Quincy Jones Explores The Music Of Henry Mancini performed by Quincy Jones
  - Neville Cardus (notes writer) for Mahler Symphony No. 5 In C Sharp Minor/Berg: "Wozzeck" Excerpts performed by Erich Leinsdorf
  - Stan Gets, João Gilberto & Gene Lees (notes writer) for Getz/Gilberto performed by Stan Getz & João Gilberto
  - Alexander Cohen (notes writer) for Beyond The Fringe '64 performed by various artists

=== Pop ===
- Best Vocal Performance, Female
  - Barbra Streisand for People
  - Gale Garnett for "We'll Sing In The Sunshine"
  - Astrud Gilberto for "The Girl From Ipanema"
  - Nancy Wilson for "How Glad I Am"
  - Petula Clark for "Downtown"
- Best Vocal Performance, Male
  - Louis Armstrong for "Hello, Dolly!"
  - Tony Bennett for "Who Can I Turn To"
  - João Gilberto for Getz/Gilberto
  - Dean Martin for Everybody Loves Somebody
  - Andy Williams for Call Me Irresponsible
- Best Performance by a Vocal Group
  - The Beatles for A Hard Day's Night
  - Double Six Of Pairs for The Double Six Sing Ray Charles
  - Peter, Paul & Mary for Peter, Paul & Mary In Concert
  - The Four Freshmen for More Four Freshmen And Five Trombones
  - The Browns for Grand Ole Opry Favorites
- Best Performance by a Chorus
  - Ward Swingle for The Swingle Singers Going Baroque performed by The Swingle Singers
  - Ray Charles Singers for "Love Me With All Your Heart"
  - The Serendipity Singers for "Don't Let The Rain Come Down (Crooked Little Man)"
  - Henry Mancini Orchestra And Chorus for "Dear Heart"
  - Stan Kenton Orchestra for Artistry In Voices And Brass conducted by Pete Rugolo
- Best Instrumental Performance - Non-Jazz
  - Henry Mancini for "The Pink Panther Theme"
  - Hollyridge Strings for The Beatles Song Book conducted by Stu Phillips
  - Quincy Jones for "Golden Boy (String Version)"
  - Al Hirt for "Cotton Candy"
  - Peter Nero for "As Long As He Needs Me"
- Best Rock and Roll Recording
  - Petula Clark for "Downtown"
  - Righteous Brothers for "You've Lost That Lovin' Feeling"
  - Roy Orbison for "Oh, Pretty Woman"
  - Bobby Vinton for "Mr. Lonely"
  - The Beatles for "A Hard Day's Night"

=== Production and engineering ===
- Best Engineered Recording - Non-Classical
  - Phil Ramone (engineer) for Getz/Gilberto performed by Stan Getz & João Gilberto
  - George Kneurr & Frank Laico (engineers) for "Who Can I Turn To" performed by Tony Bennett
  - James Malloy (engineer) for The Pink Panther performed by Henry Mancini
  - Chuck Seitz (engineer) for Sugar Lips performed by Al Hirt
  - Bernard "Bernie" Keville (engineer) for Pops Goes The Trumpet performed by Al Hirt, Arthur Fielder & The Boston Pops
  - John Kraus (engineer) for Artistry In Voices And Brass performed by Stan Kenton
- Best Engineered Recording
  - Douglas Larter (engineer), Carlo Maria Giulini (conductor) & the Philharmonia Orchestra for Britten: Young Person's Guide to the Orchestra
  - Fred Plaut (engineer) for Vladimir Horowitz Plays Beethoven, Debussy, Chopin (Beethoven: Sonata No. 8 "Pathetique"; Debussy: Preludes; Chopin: Etudes Adn Scherzos 1 Thru 4) performed by Vladimir Horowitz
  - Lewis W. Layton for Verdi: Falstaff conducted by Georg Solti
  - Lewis W. Layton (engineer) for Prokofiev: Symphony No. 5 Op.100 conducted by Erich Leinsdorf
  - Lewis W. Layton (engineer) for Mahler: Symphony No. 5 In C Sharp Minor conducted by Erich Leinsdorf
  - Fred Plaut (engineer) for Mahler: Symphony No. 2 In C Minor ("Resurrection") conducted by Leonard Bernstein
- Best Engineered Recording - Special or Novel Effects
  - David Hassinger (engineer) for The Chipmunks Sing the Beatles performed by The Chipmunks
  - Larry Levine for Walking In The Rain performed by The Ronettes
  - William "Bill" Robinson (engineer) for The Big Sounds Of The Sports Cars
  - James Malloy (engineer) for "Main Theme From The Addams Family" performed by Vic Mizzy
  - John Norman (engineer) for Les Poupees De Paris performed by various artists

=== R&B ===
- Best Rhythm & Blues Recording
  - Nancy Wilson for "(You Don't Know) How Glad I Am"
  - Dionne Warwick for "Walk On By"
  - The Impressions for Keep On Pushing
  - Joe Tex for "Hold What You've Got"
  - Sam Cooke for "Good Times"
  - The Supremes for "Baby Love"

=== Spoken ===
- Best Documentary, Spoken Word or Drama Recording (other than comedy)
  - That Was The Week That Was for BBC Tribute to John F. Kennedy performed by the That Was the Week That Was cast
  - John F. Kennedy, Adlai Stevenson & David Brinkley for The Kennedy Wit
  - Laurence Olivier for Shakespeare: Othello
  - Richard Burton for Shakespeare: Hamlet performed by original Broadway cast including Richard Burton, Hume Cronyn, Alfred Drake & Eileen Herlie
  - Sydney Michaels for Dylan performed by original cast including Kate Reid & Alec Guinness
  - Richard Burton & Peter O'Toole for Dialogue Highlights From Beckett
