= List of Cash Box Top 100 number-one singles of 1964 =

These are the songs that reached number one on the Top 100 Best Sellers chart in 1964 as published by Cash Box magazine.

Issue date	Song	Artist
January 4	There! I've Said It Again	Bobby Vinton
January 11	Louie Louie	The Kingsmen
January 18	Louie Louie	The Kingsmen
January 25	I Want to Hold Your Hand	The Beatles
February 1	I Want to Hold Your Hand	The Beatles
February 8	I Want to Hold Your Hand	The Beatles
February 15	I Want to Hold Your Hand	The Beatles
February 22	I Want to Hold Your Hand	The Beatles
February 29	I Want to Hold Your Hand	The Beatles
March 7	I Want to Hold Your Hand	The Beatles
March 14	I Want to Hold Your Hand	The Beatles
March 21	She Loves You	The Beatles
March 28	She Loves You	The Beatles
April 4	Twist and Shout	The Beatles
April 11	Can't Buy Me Love	The Beatles
April 18	Can't Buy Me Love	The Beatles
April 25	Can't Buy Me Love	The Beatles
May 2	Can't Buy Me Love	The Beatles
May 9	Can't Buy Me Love	The Beatles
May 16	Hello, Dolly!	Louis Armstrong & All Stars
May 23	Love Me Do	The Beatles
May 30	My Guy	Mary Wells
June 6	Chapel of Love	The Dixie Cups
June 13	Chapel of Love	The Dixie Cups
June 20	Chapel of Love	The Dixie Cups
June 27	A World Without Love	Peter and Gordon
July 4	I Get Around	The Beach Boys
July 11	Rag Doll	The Four Seasons
July 18	Rag Doll	The Four Seasons
July 25	A Hard Day's Night	The Beatles
August 1	A Hard Day's Night	The Beatles
August 8	A Hard Day's Night	The Beatles
August 15	Everybody Loves Somebody	Dean Martin
August 22	Where Did Our Love Go	The Supremes
August 29	Where Did Our Love Go	The Supremes
September 5	The House of the Rising Sun	The Animals
September 12	The House of the Rising Sun	The Animals
September 19	The House of the Rising Sun	The Animals
September 26	Oh, Pretty Woman	Roy Orbison & Candy Men
October 3	Oh, Pretty Woman	Roy Orbison & Candy Men
October 10	Oh, Pretty Woman	Roy Orbison & Candy Men
October 17	Do Wah Diddy Diddy	Manfred Mann
October 24	Do Wah Diddy Diddy	Manfred Mann
October 31	We'll Sing in the Sunshine	Gale Garnett
November 7	Last Kiss	J. Frank Wilson and the Cavaliers
November 14	Baby Love	The Supremes
November 21	Baby Love	The Supremes
November 28	Leader of the Pack	The Shangri-Las
December 5	She's Not There	The Zombies
December 12	Ringo	Lorne Greene
December 19	I Feel Fine	The Beatles
December 26	Come See About Me	The Supremes

== See also ==
- 1964 in music
- List of Hot 100 number-one singles of 1964 (U.S.)
