= List of Billboard Middle-Road Singles number ones of 1964 =

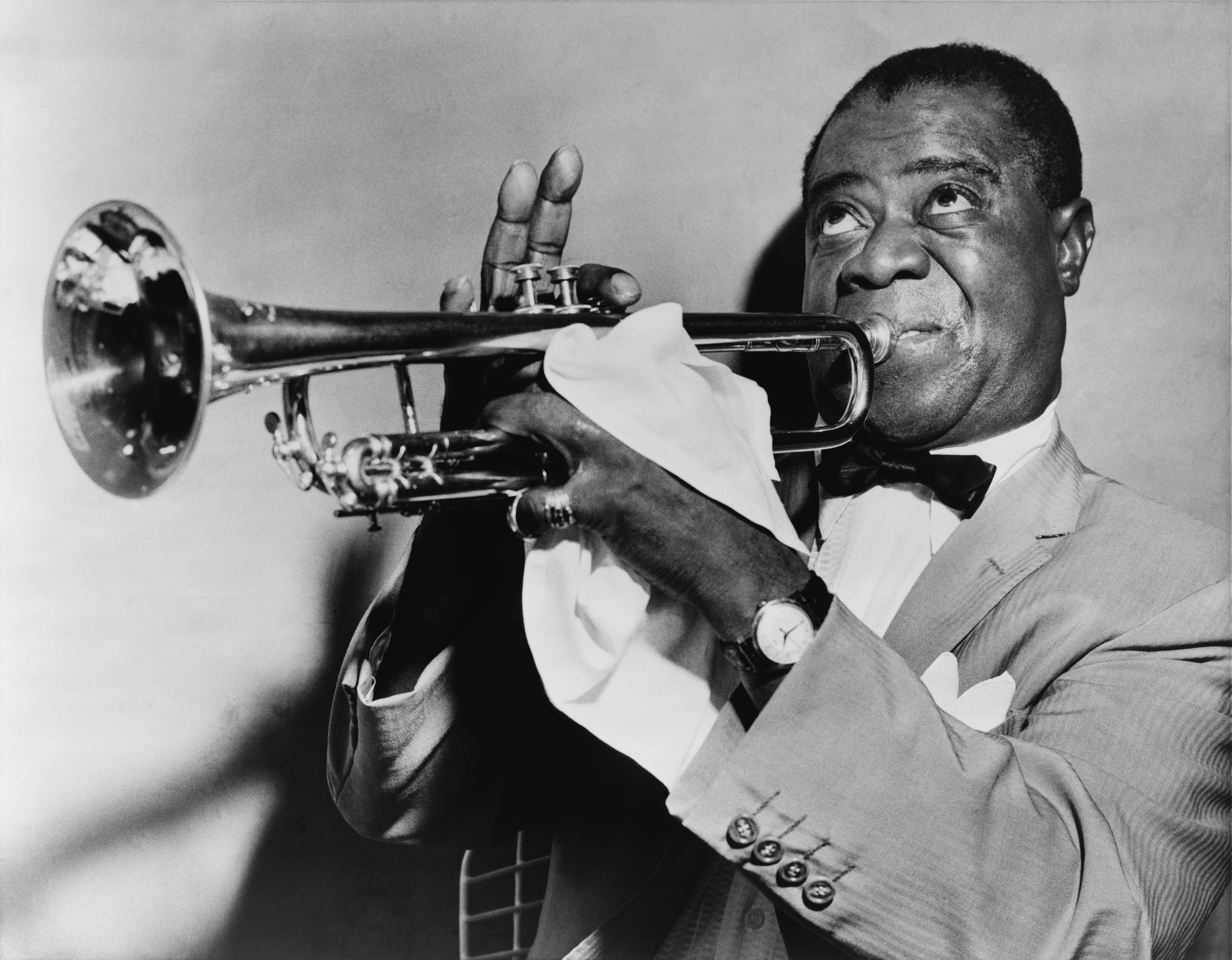
Louis Armstrong had the longest-running number one of the year with "Hello, Dolly!".

In 1964, Billboard magazine published a chart ranking the top-performing songs in the United States which were considered to be "middle of the road". The chart has undergone various name changes and since 1996 has been published under the title Adult Contemporary. Until 1965, the listing was compiled simply by extracting from Billboard's pop music chart, the Hot 100, those songs which were deemed by the magazine's staff to be of an appropriate style and ranking them according to their positions on the Hot 100. In 1964, the chart was published under the title Middle-Road Singles through the issue of Billboard dated April 25, Pop-Standard Singles through the issue dated October 17, and Middle-Road Singles again for the remainder of the year. In 52 issues of the magazine, 12 different songs topped the listing.

The only artist to achieve more than one number one in 1964 was Dean Martin, who spent eight weeks in the top spot with "Everybody Loves Somebody" and one with "The Door Is Still Open to My Heart". Martin tied for the highest total number of weeks spent at number one with Louis Armstrong, who had an unbroken run of nine weeks at number one with "Hello, Dolly!", the longest uninterrupted run in the top spot during the year. Armstrong's song was the title song of the stage musical of the same name, which had opened on Broadway earlier in the year. A second song from a newly opened musical to top the chart was "People" from Funny Girl, which gave Barbra Streisand her first Billboard chart-topper; she would go on to have one of the most successful careers in popular music history.

Four of the year's Middle-Road/Pop-Standard chart-toppers also reached number one on the magazine's pop music chart, the Hot 100, including both the first and last number ones of the year, "There! I've Said It Again" by Bobby Vinton and "Ringo" by actor-singer Lorne Greene. Armstrong's "Hello, Dolly!" and Martin's "Everybody Loves Somebody" also topped both charts. Three of the year's number ones were Grammy Award winners. Al Hirt's "Java" won the award for Best Performance by an Orchestra or Instrumentalist with Orchestra at the 1964 ceremony, and the following year "Hello, Dolly!" won the award for Song of the Year and "The Girl from Ipanema" by Stan Getz and Astrud Gilberto was named Record of the Year.

== Chart history ==
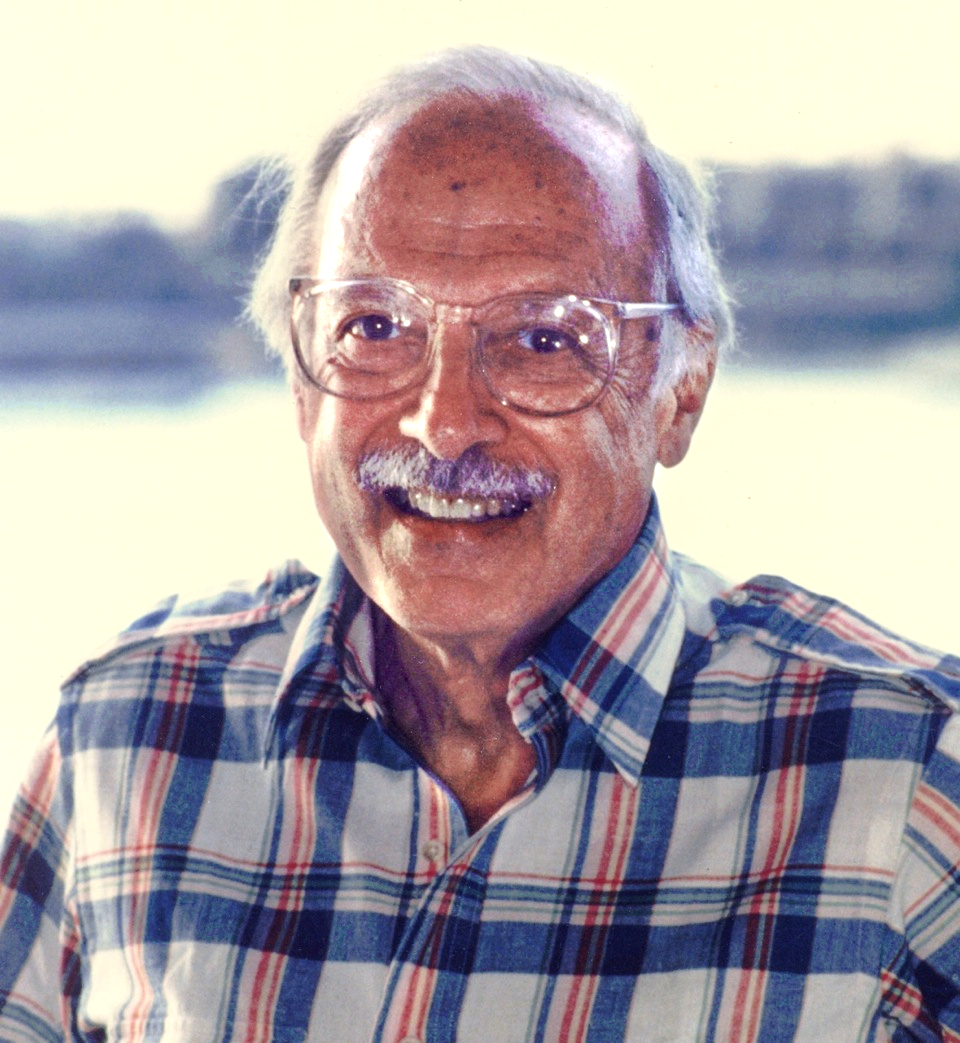
"Love Me with All Your Heart" was a chart-topper for the Ray Charles Singers (Charles pictured in 1975).

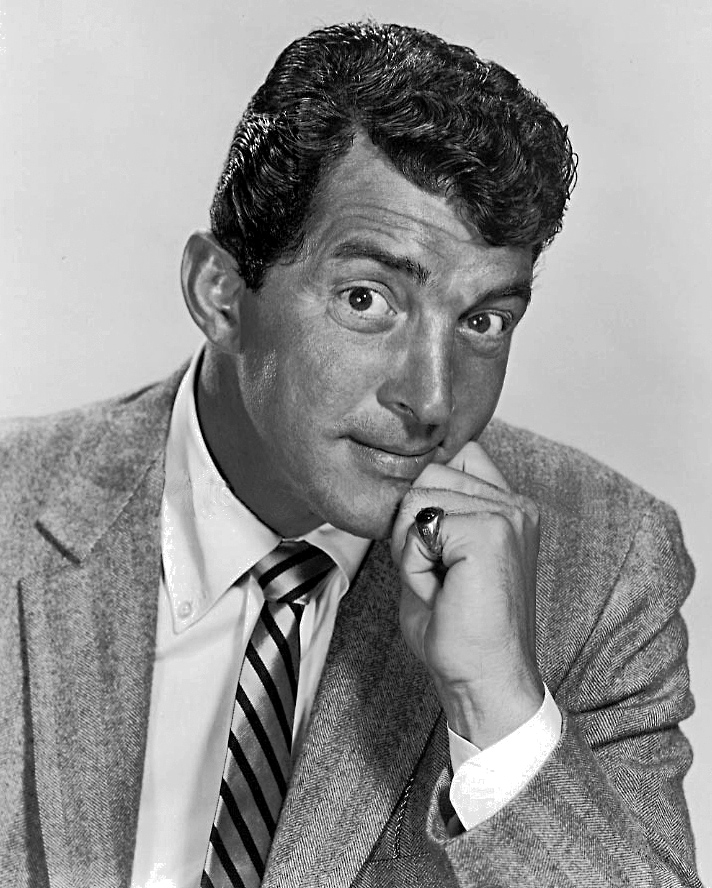
Dean Martin was the only artist with two Middle-Road number ones in 1964.

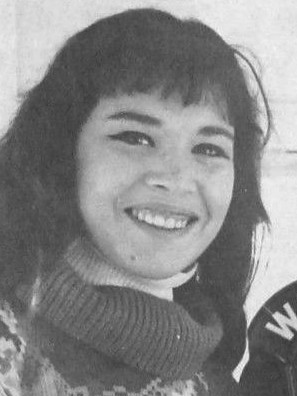
Gale Garnett had her only number one hit on the Middle-Road chart with "We'll Sing in the Sunshine".

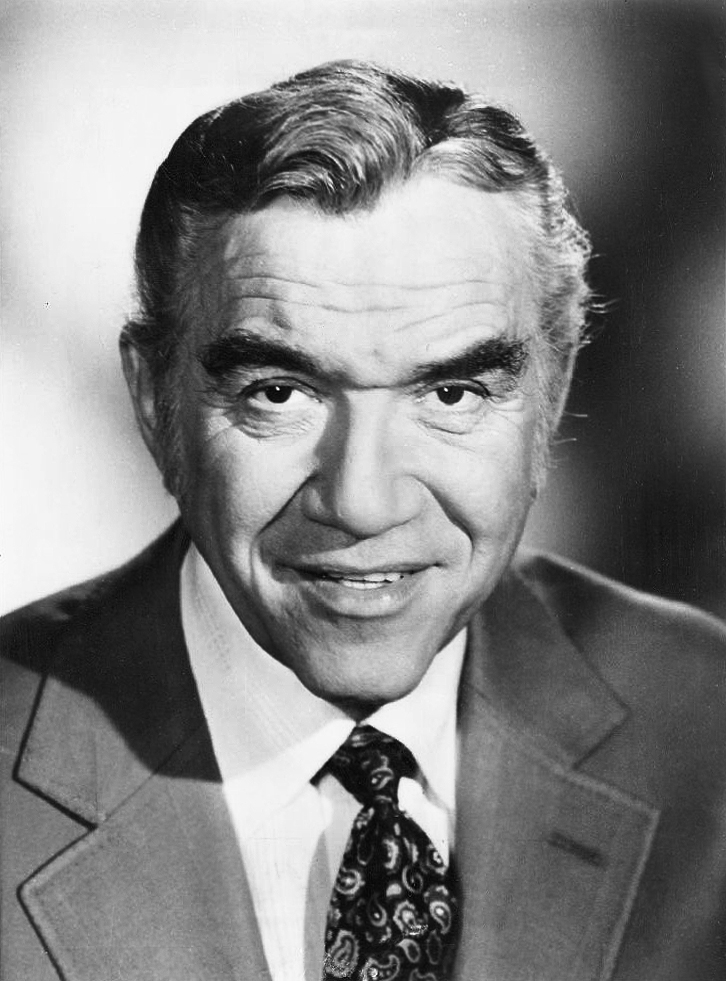
The actor-singer Lorne Greene ended the year at number one with "Ringo".

Chart history
Issue date	Title	Artist(s)	Ref.
January 4	"There! I've Said It Again"	Bobby Vinton	
January 11	"There! I've Said It Again"	Bobby Vinton	
January 18	"There! I've Said It Again"	Bobby Vinton	
January 25	"There! I've Said It Again"	Bobby Vinton	
February 1	"There! I've Said It Again"	Bobby Vinton	
February 8	"For You"	Ricky Nelson	
February 15	"For You"	Ricky Nelson	
February 22	"Java"	Al Hirt	
February 29	"Java"	Al Hirt	
March 7	"Java"	Al Hirt	
March 14	"Java"	Al Hirt	
March 21	"Navy Blue"	Diane Renay	
March 28	"Hello, Dolly!"	Louis Armstrong	
April 4	"Hello, Dolly!"	Louis Armstrong	
April 11	"Hello, Dolly!"	Louis Armstrong	
April 18	"Hello, Dolly!"	Louis Armstrong	
April 25	"Hello, Dolly!"	Louis Armstrong	
May 2	"Hello, Dolly!"	Louis Armstrong	
May 9	"Hello, Dolly!"	Louis Armstrong	
May 16	"Hello, Dolly!"	Louis Armstrong	
May 23	"Hello, Dolly!"	Louis Armstrong	
May 30	"Love Me with All Your Heart"	The Ray Charles Singers	
June 6	"Love Me with All Your Heart"	The Ray Charles Singers	
June 13	"Love Me with All Your Heart"	The Ray Charles Singers	
June 20	"Love Me with All Your Heart"	The Ray Charles Singers	
June 27	"People"	Barbra Streisand	
July 4	"People"	Barbra Streisand	
July 11	"People"	Barbra Streisand	
July 18	"The Girl from Ipanema"	Stan Getz with Astrud Gilberto	
July 25	"The Girl from Ipanema"	Stan Getz with Astrud Gilberto	
August 1	"Everybody Loves Somebody"	Dean Martin	
August 8	"Everybody Loves Somebody"	Dean Martin	
August 15	"Everybody Loves Somebody"	Dean Martin	
August 22	"Everybody Loves Somebody"	Dean Martin	
August 29	"Everybody Loves Somebody"	Dean Martin	
September 5	"Everybody Loves Somebody"	Dean Martin	
September 12	"Everybody Loves Somebody"	Dean Martin	
September 19	"Everybody Loves Somebody"	Dean Martin	
September 26	"We'll Sing in the Sunshine"	Gale Garnett	
October 3	"We'll Sing in the Sunshine"	Gale Garnett	
October 10	"We'll Sing in the Sunshine"	Gale Garnett	
October 17	"We'll Sing in the Sunshine"	Gale Garnett	
October 24	"We'll Sing in the Sunshine"	Gale Garnett	
October 31	"We'll Sing in the Sunshine"	Gale Garnett	
November 7	"We'll Sing in the Sunshine"	Gale Garnett	
November 14	"The Door Is Still Open to My Heart"	Dean Martin	
November 21	"Ringo"	Lorne Greene	
November 28	"Ringo"	Lorne Greene	
December 5	"Ringo"	Lorne Greene	
December 12	"Ringo"	Lorne Greene	
December 19	"Ringo"	Lorne Greene	
December 26	"Ringo"	Lorne Greene	
