= Dream with Dean =

Studio album by Dean Martin
- Released: August 4, 1964
- Genres: Vocal jazz; traditional pop
- Length: 30:12
- Label: Reprise – R/RS 6123
- Producer: Jimmy Bowen

Dean Martin chronology
Robin and the 7 Hoods (w/ Bing Crosby, Frank Sinatra, Sammy Davis Jr. and Peter Falk) (1964)	Dream with Dean (1964)	The Door Is Still Open to My Heart (1964)

Dream with Dean is the thirteenth studio album by Dean Martin, released on August 4, 1964 and produced by Jimmy Bowen.

This was the first of two albums that Martin released in 1964. Dream with Dean peaked at 15 on the Billboard 200. The album features "Everybody Loves Somebody" with a quartet accompaniment, Martin was to re-record the song with strings later that year, and it would become his second single to top the Billboard Hot 100.

== Reception ==
Professional ratings
Review scores
Source	Rating
Allmusic	3/5 stars

The initial Billboard review from 22 August 1964 praised the selection of material on the album and wrote that "As long as the performer is Dean Martin, you've got to see the words "sales" and "airplay" light up".

Joe Viglione on Allmusic.com gave the album three stars out of five. Viglione said that if the album had "one drawback, it is that the 12 songs are incessant in their providing the same atmosphere...not only a very pleasant listening experience, it shows what a tremendous vocalist Dean Martin truly was". Vigilone describes Martin as performing as if "he were a lounge singer at 1:15 a.m. as the Saturday night crowd is dwindling".

== Track listing ==
No.	Title	Writer(s)	Length
1.	"I'm Confessin' (That I Love You)"	Don Dougherty, Ellis Reynolds, Al J. Neiburg	3:15
2.	"Fools Rush In (Where Angels Fear to Tread)"	Rube Bloom, Johnny Mercer	3:04
3.	"I'll Buy That Dream"	Herbert Magidson	3:16
4.	"If You Were the Only Girl (In the World)"	Clifford Grey, Nat Ayer	3:03
5.	"Blue Moon"	Richard Rodgers, Lorenz Hart	3:07
6.	"Everybody Loves Somebody"	Sam Coslow, Irving Taylor, Ken Lane	3:11
7.	"I Don't Know Why (I Just Do)"	Fred E. Ahlert, Roy Turk	2:36
8.	"Gimme a Little Kiss, Will Ya, Huh?"	Maceo Pinkard	2:18
9.	"Hands Across the Table"	Jean Delettre	2:18
10.	"Smile"	Charlie Chaplin, John Turner, Geoffrey Parsons	2:58
11.	"My Melancholy Baby"	Ernie Burnett, George A. Norton	2:45
12.	"Baby Won't You Please Come Home"	Charles Warfield, Clarence Williams	2:18

- "I'm Confessin' (That I Love You)" was re-recorded for 1973's You're the Best Thing That Ever Happened to Me.
  - "I Don't Know Why (I Just Do)" was originally cut for 1957's Pretty Baby. A third version is on You're the Best Thing That Ever Happened to Me.
    - "Gimme a Little Kiss, Will Ya, Huh?" was re-recorded for You're the Best Thing That Ever Happened to Me.
      - "Smile" was re-recorded for 1973's Sittin' on Top of the World.
        - "Baby, Won't You Please Come Home" was waxed a second time for 1966's The Dean Martin TV Show and a final time for You're the Best Thing That Ever Happened to Me.

== Personnel ==
Performance

- Dean Martin – vocals
- Ken Lane – piano
- Barney Kessel – guitar
- Red Mitchell – double bass
- Irving Cottler – drums

Production

- Stan Cornyn – liner notes
- Jimmy Bowen – producer
