= Hello, Dolly! =

Hello, Dolly! may refer to:

- Hello, Dolly! (musical), with music and lyrics by Jerry Herman, first staged in 1964
  - "Hello, Dolly!" (song), the title song first recorded by Louis Armstrong, often covered as a pop standard
  - Hello, Dolly! (original Broadway cast recording), a 1964 album containing a recording of the above musical
  - Hello, Dolly! (film), the musical's 1969 screen adaptation
    - Hello, Dolly! (soundtrack), recording from the 1969 musical film
- Hello, Dolly! (Ella Fitzgerald album), 1964
- Hello, Dolly! (Louis Armstrong album), 1964
- A seven-layer dessert bar
