= Dean Martin Hits Again =

Studio album by Dean Martin
- Released: January 1965
- Recorded: January 1965
- Genres: Traditional pop, country
- Length: 24:32
- Label: Reprise - R/RS 6146
- Producer: Jimmy Bowen

Dean Martin chronology
The Door Is Still Open to My Heart (1964)	Dean Martin Hits Again (1965)	(Remember Me) I'm the One Who Loves You (1965)

Dean Martin Hits Again is the fifteenth studio album by Dean Martin, released in 1965, produced by Jimmy Bowen and arranged by Ernie Freeman. The album was a Top 20 hit, and Martin's fourth gold album.

This was Martin's first album to be produced by Bowen and arranged by Freeman. The previous year they had arranged and produced Martin's biggest hit, "Everybody Loves Somebody". "You're Nobody 'Til Somebody Loves You" had appeared on the 1964 album The Door Is Still Open to My Heart.

Dean Martin Hits Again peaked at 13 on the Billboard Top LPs. "Send Me the Pillow You Dream On," went into the Top 20 of the pop charts and the Top 5 of the easy listening chart.

== Reception ==
Professional ratings
Review scores
Source	Rating
Allmusic	3/5 stars

The initial Billboard magazine review from February 13, 1965 commented that "Rack up another winner for Dino...well chosen material, well performed and strong support from Ernie Freeman's arrangements".

William Ruhlmann on Allmusic.com gave the album three stars out of five and commented that the production formula of Bowen and Freeman was "already sounding very repetitious".

== Track listing ==
No.	Title	Writer(s)	Length
1.	"You're Nobody till Somebody Loves You"	Russ Morgan, Larry Stock, James Cavanaugh	1:58
2.	"I'll Hold You in My Heart"	Eddy Arnold, Hall Horton, Tommy Dilbeck	2:39
3.	"Have a Heart"	Ken Lane, Irving Taylor	2:40
4.	"My Heart Is an Open Book"	Hal David, Lee Pockriss	2:02
5.	"You'll Always Be the One I Love"	Ticker Freeman, Sunny Skylar	2:02
6.	"Send Me the Pillow You Dream On"	Hank Locklin	2:32
7.	"In the Chapel in the Moonlight"	Billy Hill	2:34
8.	"Send Me Some Lovin'"	John Marascalco	2:39
9.	"Wedding Bells"	Claude Boone	2:44
10.	"I'll Be Seeing You"	Sammy Fain, Irving Kahal	2:42

== Personnel ==
- Dean Martin – vocals
- Ernie Freeman – arranger
- Jimmy Bowen – producer
- Hal Blaine - drums
