= (Remember Me) I'm the One Who Loves You (album) =

Studio album by Dean Martin
- Released: September 1965
- Recorded: 1965
- Genres: Traditional pop, country
- Length: 31:56
- Label: Reprise – R/RS 6170
- Producer: Jimmy Bowen

Dean Martin chronology
Dean Martin Hits Again (1965)	(Remember Me) I'm the One Who Loves You (1965)	Houston (1965)

(Remember Me) I'm the One Who Loves You is the sixteenth studio album by Dean Martin, produced by Jimmy Bowen and arranged by Ernie Freeman. The album was Martin's fifth album to appear in the Top 40, and peaked at number 12 on the Billboard Top LPs chart. The album's release in September 1965 corresponded with the debut of Martin's long-running TV series The Dean Martin Show.

The album was reissued on CD by Hip-O Records in 2009.

== Reception ==
Professional ratings
Review scores
Source	Rating
AllMusic	3/5 stars

William Ruhlmann on AllMusic gave the album three stars out of five, commenting on the "Formula" developed by Bowen for Martin's sound, of "piano triplets, a 4/4 beat, swooping strings, a female chorus." Ruhlman added that "...The country market never bit at these records, but Martin had a clutch of material that sounded fresh to pop fans. And, the liner notes notwithstanding, Bowen and Freeman knew that the time had come to vary the formula."

== Track listing ==
No.	Title	Writer(s)	Length
1.	"(Remember Me) I'm the One Who Loves You"	Stuart Hamblen	2:24
2.	"King of the Road"	Roger Miller	2:22
3.	"Welcome to My World"	John Hathcock, Ray Winkler	2:20
4.	"My Shoes Keep Walking Back to You"	Lee Ross, Bob Wills	2:55
5.	"Born to Lose"	Frankie Brown, Ted Daffan	2:30
6.	"The Birds and the Bees"	Herb Newman, Barrington Stuart	2:05
7.	"Walk on By"	Kendall Hayes, Gary Walker	2:40
8.	"Red Roses for a Blue Lady"	Roy Brodsky, Sid Tepper	2:45
9.	"Take These Chains from My Heart"	Hy Heath, Fred Rose	2:42
10.	"Here Comes My Baby"	Bill West, Dottie West	3:17
11.	"I Don't Think You Love Me Anymore"	Don Lanier	2:35
12.	"Bumming Around"	Peter Graves	2:41

== Personnel ==
- Dean Martin – vocals
- Ernie Freeman – arranger
- Jimmy Bowen – producer
- Ed Thrasher – photography
- Hal Blaine - drums
