= Something Special for Young Lovers =

Studio album by Ray Charles Singers
- Released: 1964
- Recorded: 1964
- Genre: Easy listening, doo-wop
- Length: 31:18
- Label: Command

Ray Charles Singers chronology
Something Wonderful (1961)	Something Special for Young Lovers (1964)	Al-Di-La & Other Special Songs for Young Lovers (1964)

Singles from Something Special for Young Lovers
- 1. "Love Me with All Your Heart" Released: April 1964; 2. "Hello, Dolly!" Released: March 1964

Something Special for Young Lovers is the fifteenth studio album by the Ray Charles Singers. It peaked at number 11 on the Billboard Top LPs & Tape chart in 1964. Its biggest single was "Love Me with All Your Heart", which peaked at number one on the Adult Contemporary chart and number three on the Billboard Hot 100 chart.

== Track listing ==
Side one

1. "This Could Be the Start of Something" – 1:59
2. "I Left My Heart in San Francisco" – 3:13
3. "More" – 2:25
4. "There! I've Said It Again" – 2:13
5. "This Is All I Ask" – 2:55
6. "Dominique" – 2:36

Side two

1. "Hello, Dolly!" – 2:11
2. "Quiet Nights" – 2:41
3. "Love Me with All Your Heart" – 2:18
4. "Charade" – 2:54
5. "What Kind of Fool Am I?" – 3:23
6. "Sweet Little Mountain Bird" - 2:21

== Charts ==
Chart (1964)	Peak position
US Billboard 200	11
