= Ed Thrasher =

American graphic designer (1932–2006)

Edward Lee Thrasher Jr. (March 7, 1932 – August 5, 2006) was an American art director and photographer. He was the recipient of a number of Grammy Award nominations for his work on album covers and won a Grammy for Best Album Package in 1974 for the Mason Proffit cover Come & Gone. He worked with various recording artists and is known for his influence on album cover design.

== Biography ==
Thrasher was born on March 7, 1932, in Glendale, California, to a Los Angeles city councilman. He served in the US Navy during the Korean War attending Los Angeles Trade Technical College upon his return. In 1957, began working at Capitol Records as an assistant, later becoming the Head Art Director and photographer. In 1964, he joined Warner Bros. Records, where he designed a number of album covers, including the Jimi Hendrix Experience's Are You Experienced, Van Morrison's Astral Weeks, the Grateful Dead's Anthem of the Sun and the Doobie Brothers' Toulouse Street. He was also a part of the architectural team to build the Warner Bros. Records building in Burbank. In 1979, Thrasher left Warner Bros. Records to start his own advertising company, Ed Thrasher and Associates. Here, he created art for films including Prince's "Purple Rain" and Mel Gibson's "Mad Max Beyond Thunderdome." Throughout his career, Thrasher worked with a plethora of famous artists including Frank Sinatra, Jimi Hendrix, Grateful Dead, James Taylor, and Van Morrison.

Thraster was married to Linda Gray from 1962 to 1983.

Thrasher died on August 5, 2006, aged 74, from cancer, at his home in Big Bear Lake, California.

== Influence ==
Thrasher had a great influence on the world of album cover design. Before the 1960s, album cover designs typically used only a picture of an artist or an inanimate object, not being reflective of the artist or the music. Thrasher helped to change this by combining different types of photography to capture the energy of the band and the way they performed their concerts. He utilized portraits and live scenes. This allowed for an album cover to better market an artist's image. Thrasher was also known for being very versatile and able to adapt the design to whatever artist he was working with.

== Awards and nominations ==
=== Grammy Awards ===
| Year | Nominated album | Artist | Category | Result |
|---|---|---|---|---|
| 1963 | Potpourri Par Piaf | Edith Piaf | Best Album Cover - Other Than Classical | Nominated |
| 1964 | Carl Reiner and Mel Brooks at the Cannes Film Festival | Carl Reiner and Mel Brooks | Best Album Cover - Other Than Classical | Nominated |
| 1965 | Poitier Meets Plato | Sidney Poitier | Best Album Cover - Other Than Classical | Nominated |
| 1966 | Concert in the Virgin Islands | Duke Ellington | Best Album Cover - Graphic Arts | Nominated |
| 1966 | The Aznavour Story | Charles Aznavour | Best Album Cover - Photography | Nominated |
| 1967 | Sammy Davis Jr. Sings and Laurindo Almeida Plays | Sammy Davis Jr. | Best Album Cover - Photography | Nominated |
| 1968 | The Gold Standard Collection | Hank Thompson | Best Album Cover - Graphic Arts | Nominated |
| 1971 | Hand Made | Mason Williams | Best Album Cover | Nominated |
| 1972 | Hot Platters | Various Artists | Best Album Cover | Nominated |
| 1972 | Sharepickers | Mason Williams | Best Album Cover | Nominated |
| 1973 | Sunset Ride | Zephyr | Best Album Cover | Nominated |
| 1975 | Come & Gone | Mason Proffit | Best Album Package | Won |
