= The Door Is Still Open to My Heart (album) =

Studio album by Dean Martin
- Released: November 1964
- Recorded: 1964
- Genres: Traditional pop, country, countrypolitan
- Length: 31:12
- Label: Reprise – R/RS 6140
- Producer: Jimmy Bowen

Dean Martin chronology
| Dream with Dean (1964) | The Door Is Still Open to My Heart (1964) | Dean Martin Hits Again (1965) |

Singles from The Door Is Still Open to My Heart
- 1. "The Door Is Still Open to My Heart" Released: September 1964; 2. "You're Nobody till Somebody Loves You" Released: December 1964

The Door Is Still Open to My Heart is the fourteenth studio album by Dean Martin, released in November 1964, produced by Jimmy Bowen and featuring arrangements by Ernie Freeman, Gus Levene and Marty Paich.

Three of the songs from the album, ("I'm Gonna Change Everything," "The Middle of the Night Is My Cryin' Time," and "My Sugar's Gone") had previously featured on Martin's 1963 album Dean "Tex" Martin Rides Again.

The Door Is Still Open to My Heart peaked at number 9 on the Billboard 200. "Send Me the Pillow You Dream On," which went into the Top 20 of the pop charts and the Top 5 of the easy listening chart.

"You're Nobody till Somebody Loves You" was released as a single from the album and was a Top 40 hit for Martin, and his third song to top the Easy Listening charts.

== Reception ==
Professional ratings
Review scores
| Source | Rating |
|---|---|
| AllMusic | 3/5 stars |

William Ruhlmann on AllMusic gave the album three stars out of five and commented that aside from the songs newly recorded for the album, "the resulting lineup fit for the most part into the "hit plus filler" formula of albums assembled mainly for people who didn't like to buy 45s."

== Track listing ==
| No. | Title | Writer(s) | Length |
|---|---|---|---|
| 1. | "The Door Is Still Open to My Heart" | Chuck Willis | 2:52 |
| 2. | "We'll Sing in the Sunshine" | Gale Garnett | 2:48 |
| 3. | "I'm Gonna Change Everything" | Alex Zanetis | 2:30 |
| 4. | "The Middle of the Night Is My Cryin' Time" | Sheb Wooley | 2:46 |
| 5. | "Every Minute, Every Hour" | Ken Lane, Irving Taylor | 2:08 |
| 6. | "Clinging Vine" | Leon Carr, Burton Lane, Earl Shuman, Mort Shuman | 2:22 |
| 7. | "In the Misty Moonlight" | Cindy Walker | 2:43 |
| 8. | "Always Together" | Peter DeAngelis, Jean Sawyer | 2:49 |
| 9. | "My Sugar's Gone" | Walter Kent, Harry Warren | 2:57 |
| 10. | "You're Nobody till Somebody Loves You" | James Cavanaugh, Russ Morgan, Larry Stock | 1:57 |
| 11. | "Take Me" | Rube Bloom, Mack David, Bert Kaempfert | 2:44 |
| 12. | "So Long Baby" | Gene Cross | 2:36 |

== Personnel ==
- Dean Martin – vocals
- Ernie Freeman – arranger, tracks 1, 2, 5–8, 10, 12
- Gus Levene – arranger, track 11
- Marty Paich – arranger, tracks 3, 4, 9
- Jimmy Bowen – producer
- Phil Stern – photography
- Hal Blaine - drums
