= Hello, Dolly! (original Broadway cast recording) =

Hello, Dolly!: The Original Broadway Cast Recording

Cast recording by the original Broadway cast
- Released: 1964
- Recorded: 1964
- Genre: Show tunes
- Label: RCA Victor

Professional ratings
Review scores
Source	Rating
AllMusic	3.5/5 stars

Hello, Dolly!, subtitled The Original Broadway Cast Recording, is an album containing a recording of the 1964 Broadway musical Hello, Dolly! made by its original cast. The album was released in the same year on RCA Victor.

The album peaked at number one on the Billboard Top LPs chart for the week of June 6 and finished 1964 as the best-selling album of the year in the United States according to Billboard.

== Track listing ==
LP – RCA Victor LOC 1087 (mono), LSO 1087 (stereo)

Side 1
No.	Title	Length
1.	"Overture"
2.	"I Put My Hand In"
3.	"It Takes a Woman"
4.	"Put On Your Sunday Clothes"
5.	"Ribbons down My Back"
6.	"Motherhood"
7.	"Dancing"

Side 2
No.	Title	Length
1.	"Before the Parade Passes By"
2.	"Elegance"
3.	"Hello, Dolly!"
4.	"It Only Takes a Moment"
5.	"So Long Dearie"
6.	"Finale"

== Charts ==
=== Weekly charts ===
Chart (1964)	Peak position
US Billboard Top LPs	1

=== Year-end charts ===
Chart (1964)	Position
US Billboard 200	1

== Certifications ==
Region	Certification	Certified units/sales
United States (RIAA)	Gold	500,000^{^}
^{^} Shipments figures based on certification alone.

== Awards ==
Year	Award type	Categories	Results	Ref.
1965	Grammy Awards	Best Score from an Original Cast Show Album	Nominated	
