= The Wonderful World of the Young =

Single by Danny Williams with Geoff Love and His Orchestra
- B-side: "A Kind of Loving"
- Released: 1962
- Genre: Traditional pop
- Length: 2:46
- Label: His Master's Voice
- Songwriter(s): Sid Tepper, Roy C. Bennett

Danny Williams singles chronology
"Jeannie" (1962)	"The Wonderful World of the Young" (1962)	"Tears" (1962)

"The Wonderful World of the Young" is a song written by Sid Tepper and Roy C. Bennett, and first recorded by American singer Andy Williams, whose version reached No. 99 on the Billboard Hot 100 in March 1962. The following month, a version by British singer Danny Williams was more successful, peaking at No. 8 on the UK Singles Chart.

Other versions have been recorded by Lawrence Welk, Phil Tate, and John Treacy Egan.
