= I Love You More and More Every Day =

Single by Al Martino

from the album I Love You More and More Every Day/Tears and Roses
- B-side: "I'm Living My Heaven with You"
- Released: January 13, 1964
- Genre: Traditional pop
- Length: 2:14
- Label: Capitol
- Songwriter: Don Robertson
- Producer: Voyle Gilmore

Al Martino singles chronology
"Living a Lie" (1963)	"I Love You More and More Every Day" (1964)	"Tears and Roses" (1964)

"I Love You More and More Every Day" is a song written by Don Robertson and performed by Al Martino. It was featured on his 1964 album I Love You More and More Every Day/Tears and Roses. The single was arranged by Peter DeAngelis and produced by Voyle Gilmore.

== Chart performance ==
It reached #3 on the adult contemporary chart, #9 on the U.S. pop chart, and #11 on the Cashbox chart in 1964. The song ranked #73 on Billboard magazine's Top 100 singles of 1964.

== Other charting versions ==
- Joe Dolan covered the song in 1965, released on the Pye Label.
- Sonny James covered the song (as "I Love You More and More Everyday") in 1973, releasing a single that peaked at #3 on the Canadian country chart and #4 on the U.S. country chart.

== Other versions ==
- Lawrence Welk and His Orchestra released a version of the song on their 1964 album Early Hits of 1964.
- Bob Braun released a version of the song on his 1965 album Introducing: Bob Braun.
- Jean Shepard released a version of the song on her 1965 album It's a Man Every Time.
- Kitty Wells released a version of the song on her 1973 album Yours Truly.
- Marilyn Sellars released a version of the song on her 1975 album Gather Me.
- Pat Boone released a version of the song on his 1980 compilation album Love Letters.
- Foster and Allen released a version of the song on their 1992 compilation album Heart Strings.
