= Jan Balet =

German painter, graphic artist and illustrator (1913-2009)

- Born: 20 July 1913; Bremen, Germany
- Died: 31 January 2009 (aged 95); Estavayer-le-Lac, Switzerland
- Website: janbalet.com

Jan Balet (1913 – 2009) was a painter, graphic artist and illustrator, known for his naive style

Balet was born on 20 July 1913 in Bremen, Germany. He studied at the Academy of Fine Arts, Munich. He emigrated to the United States in 1938 and began a career in commercial art in New York City. For a time he was the art director for Mademoiselle magazine. His work was included in the 1949 exhibition The 28th Annual Exhibition of Advertising and Editorial Art of the New York Art Directors Club at the Museum of Modern Art. In 1962 he created a cover for The Saturday Evening Post.

Balet illustrated several children's books including The Snow Queen in 1942 and What Makes an Orchestra in 1962.

Balet died on 31 January 2009 in Estavayer-le-Lac, Switzerland.
