= C'mon and Swim =

Single by Bobby Freeman

from the album C'mon and Swim
- B-side: "C'mon and Swim—Part 2"
- Released: June 1964
- Genre: Rock and roll
- Length: 2:43
- Label: Autumn
- Songwriters: Thomas Coman, Sylvester Stewart
- Producer: Sylvester Stewart

Bobby Freeman singles chronology
"Let's Surf Again" (1963)	"C'mon and Swim" (1964)	"S-W-I-M" (1964)

"C'mon and Swim" is a song by Bobby Freeman, written by Thomas Coman and Sylvester Stewart (later known as Sly Stone) and produced by Stewart. It reached No.5 on the U.S. pop chart in 1964 and No. 3 in Canada. It was featured on Freeman's 1964 album C'mon and Swim. The song peaked at #6 on the New Zealand Lever Hit Parade charts.

The song ranked No.54 on Billboard magazine's Top 100 singles of 1964.

== Other charting versions ==
- Ray Columbus & the Invaders released a version as a single in 1965 which reached No.71 in Australia.

== Other versions ==
- Ray Anthony – on his 1964 album Swim, Swim, C'mon and Swim.
- Enoch Light and His Orchestra – on their 1964 album Discotheque: Dance Dance Dance.
- Billy Strange – on his 1964 album The James Bond Theme.
- Leroy Jones recorded a rendition that was released on Hit 136.
- Lloyd Thaxton – on his 1964 album Lloyd Thaxton Presents.
- A version re-titled, "Jerk" was recorded by Mexican group, Los Rebeldes del Rock and released on Orfeon 45-1715.
- The Up featuring Allen Ginsberg – on their 1995 compilation album Killer Up! (1969–1972).
- Martha and the Vandellas – on their 2013 compilation album 50th Anniversary – The Singles Collection 1962–1972.
