= Carl Reiner and Mel Brooks at the Cannes Film Festival =

Live album by Carl Reiner and Mel Brooks
- Released: 1963
- Recorded: 1963 at the Cannes Film Festival, Cannes
- Genre: Comedy
- Length: 31:18
- Label: Capitol W 1815

Carl Reiner and Mel Brooks chronology
2000 and One Years with Carl Reiner and Mel Brooks (1961)	Carl Reiner and Mel Brooks at the Cannes Film Festival (1963)	2000 and Thirteen (1973)

Carl Reiner and Mel Brooks at the Cannes Film Festival is a live 1963 comedy album by the American comedians Carl Reiner and Mel Brooks, recorded at the Cannes Film Festival. It was the third album released by the pair, and their last recording in 12 years. In 1964 at the 6th Annual Grammy Awards it was nominated for both Best Comedy Performance and Best Album Cover – Other Than Classical.

Characters on the album include the Italian film director "Federico Fetuchini" (inspired by Federico Fellini), the Nazi inspired "Adolph Hartner", and the British Tippy Skittles K.C.V.B.

== Reception ==
The Negro Digest positively reviewed the album in their September 1963 issue, highlighting the satire on Italian film directors as the "richest ore of humour in this platter". Referencing the character's imaginary film, Rape, the Negro Digest wrote that "Everything is rape with Mr. Fetuchini. He loves it. And so will the listener".

== Track listing ==
1. "The Cannes Film Festival" – 9:59
2. "Dr. Felix Wheird" – 5:26
3. "2000 and Two Year Old Man" – 9:41
4. "The L.M.N.O.P. Ad Agency" – 6:12
