= White on White (song) =

Single by Danny Williams

from the album White on White
- B-side: "The Comedy Is Ended"
- Released: 1964
- Genre: Traditional pop
- Length: 2:15
- Label: United Artists
- Songwriter(s): Bernice Ross, Lor Crane
- Producer(s): Jack Gold

Danny Williams singles chronology
"A Little Toy Balloon" (1964)	"White on White" (1964)	"Today" (1964)

"White on White" is a song by British singer Danny Williams. It was a top ten hit in the U.S., peaking at No. 9 on the Billboard Hot 100 in 1964.

This song, sung by the narrator, is about himself, sadly, having to witness the wedding of his former girlfriend to another man. He plans to kiss the bride, and do everything politely, in accepting the fact that she does not belong to the narrator.

Another interpretation: If you follow the narration, is a father doing all the things the father of the bride does in a wedding: waiting at the altar for the bride to come down the aisle, "silently saying 'I do'.", and the thought that "She has been my only love since she was thirteen."

Other versions have been recorded by Nelson Riddle, Rob de Nijs in Dutch, and by Peter Beil in German.

== Chart performance ==
Chart (1964)	Peak position
U.S. Billboard Hot 100	9
U.S. Billboard Middle-Road Singles	3
