= The Door Is Still Open to My Heart =

- German release picture sleeve

Single by Dean Martin

from the album The Door Is Still Open to My Heart
- B-side: "Every Minute Every Hour"
- Released: 1964
- Genre: Traditional pop
- Length: 2:40
- Label: Reprise
- Songwriter: Chuck Willis
- Producer: Jimmy Bowen

Dean Martin singles chronology
"Everybody Loves Somebody" (1964)	"The Door Is Still Open to My Heart" (1964)	"Every Minute Every Hour" (1964)

"The Door Is Still Open to My Heart" is a 1955 song written by Chuck Willis and originally performed by the Baltimore-based R&B vocal group, The Cardinals. In the US, the original version peaked at number four on the R&B playlist and number ten in R&B sales charts. Later in 1955, Don Cornell recorded the song and released it as the B-side to his hit, "Most of All". The Hilltoppers had a moderate hit with this song the same year.

== Dean Martin version ==
In 1964, Dean Martin recorded the most successful version of the song. Martin's version spent 11 weeks on the Billboard Hot 100 chart, peaking at No. 6, while spending one week at No. 1 on Billboard's "Middle-Road Singles" chart that November. In Canada, the song reached No. 22 on RPM's "Top 40 & 5" chart, and No. 15 on the CHUM Hit Parade. In New Zealand, the song reached No. 6 on the "Lever Hit Parade".

== See also ==
- List of number-one adult contemporary singles of 1964 (U.S.)
