= List of Billboard Hot 100 number ones of 1964 =

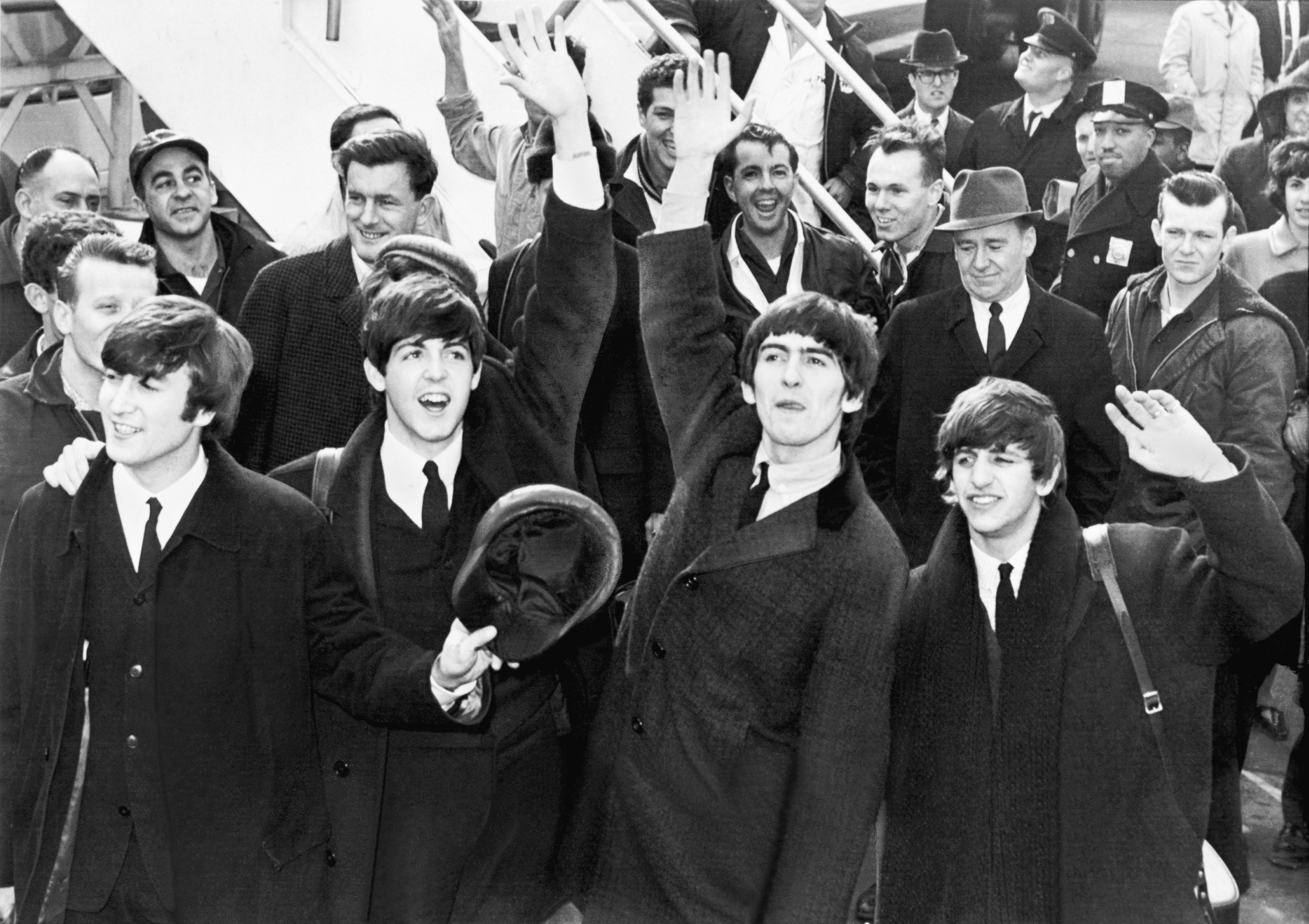
The Beatles achieved their breakthrough in the United States in 1964 and had six number-one singles during the year.

The Billboard Hot 100 is a chart published since August 1958 by Billboard magazine which ranks the best-performing singles in the United States. In 1964, it was compiled based on a combination of sales and airplay data sourced from surveys of retail outlets and playlists submitted by radio stations respectively, and 23 different singles spent time at number one.

In the issue of Billboard dated January 4, Bobby Vinton moved into the number-one position with "There! I've Said It Again", displacing the final number one of 1963, "Dominique" by the Singing Nun. The single held the top spot for four weeks before being replaced by "I Want to Hold Your Hand", the first Hot 100 number one for the Beatles. Having released their first single in 1962, the British band had experienced a dramatic surge in popularity, dubbed "Beatlemania", in their native country in 1963. Capitol Records, the label which held the rights to their singles in the United States, initially declined to release them, however, deeming them unsuitable for the U.S. market. In late 1963, following a news report about the group's success in Britain, a prominent U.S. radio DJ obtained and played an imported copy of the group's latest UK single, "I Want to Hold Your Hand". The track's popularity grew rapidly, prompting Capitol to release it in the United States; it was an immediate success and reached number one on the Hot 100 in the issue dated February 1, 1964. It spent seven weeks at number one before being replaced by an older Beatles single, "She Loves You", which had been licensed to a smaller label in the United States the previous year without success when Capitol passed on it. This in turn was replaced in the issue dated April 4 by the group's next Capitol single, "Can't Buy Me Love", which extended the Beatles' run at number one to 14 weeks. In the week that "Can't Buy Me Love" moved into the top spot, the continued success of their preceding two chart-toppers as well as further releases which had been licensed to other labels meant that the Beatles achieved the unprecedented feat of occupying the entire top five.

Later in the year, the Beatles topped the Hot 100 with the new singles "A Hard Day's Night" and "I Feel Fine", as well as "Love Me Do", their debut single originally released in the UK in 1962, to give them a total of six chart-toppers during the year. Vinton and the Supremes were the only other acts with more than one number one in 1964. The Beatles' total of 18 weeks in the top spot during 1964 was more than twice the figure achieved by any other act. Their success triggered what was dubbed the British Invasion of the U.S. music scene, and three other British acts, Peter and Gordon, the Animals, and Manfred Mann, topped the Hot 100 during the year. Prior to 1964, there had only been two Hot 100 number ones by British acts: Mr. Acker Bilk in May 1962 and the Tornados in December 1962. (Note: In 1952, the British singer Vera Lynn (accompanied by the Soldiers and Airmen of Her Majesty's Forces and the Johnny Johnston Singers) reached number one on the separate sales, airplay, and jukebox play charts published by Billboard before the creation of the Hot 100.) Seven other acts gained their first number-one singles in 1964: Louis Armstrong, Mary Wells, the Dixie Cups, the Beach Boys, the Supremes, the Shangri-Las, and Lorne Greene. Dean Martin topped the Hot 100 for the first time, having previously topped the separate sales and airplay listings which Billboard published prior to the launch of the consolidated chart in 1958. Some of 1964's number ones have been considered among the greatest pop songs ever recorded. In 2024, Rolling Stone magazine ranked "I Want to Hold Your Hand" at number 15 and "She Loves You" at number 135 on its list of the 500 greatest songs of all time, and 1964 chart-toppers by the Animals and the Shangri-Las also featured on the list. "A Hard Day's Night" by the Beatles and "Where Did Our Love Go" by the Supremes had been included on earlier iterations of the list.

== Chart history ==
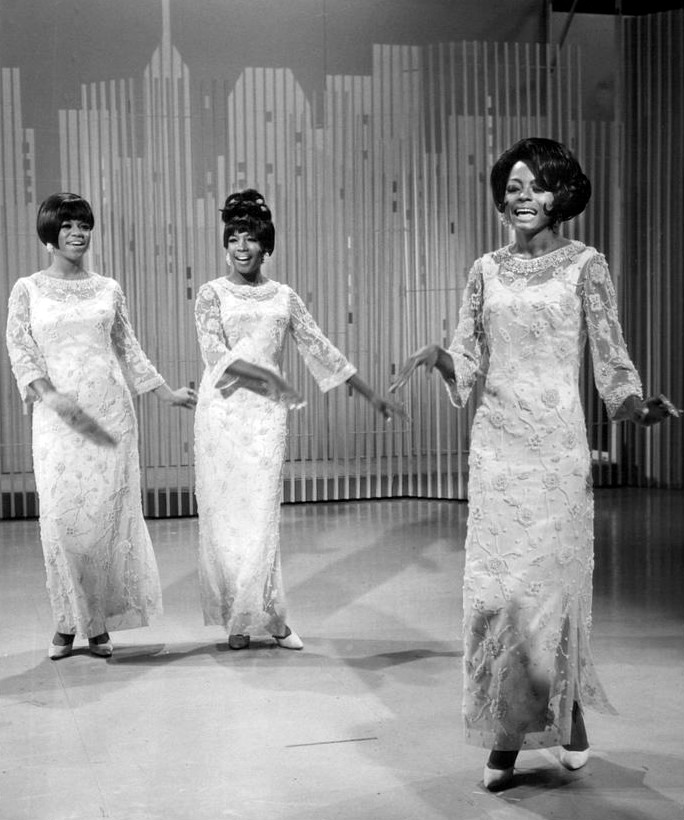
The Supremes had three number ones in 1964.

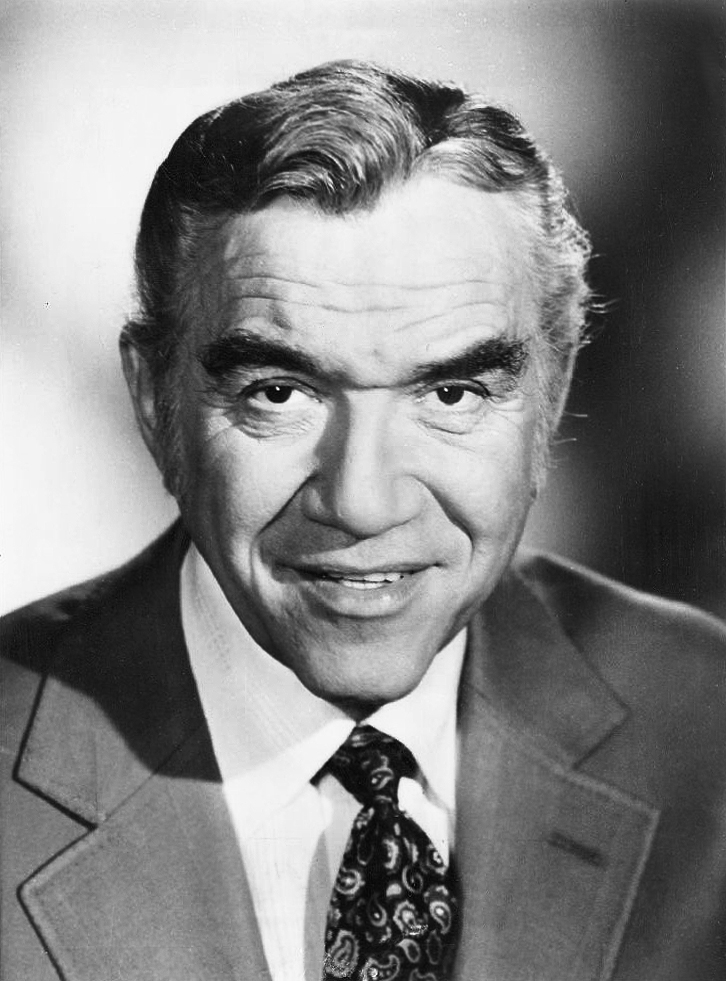
Lorne Greene, better known as an actor, had a number one with "Ringo".

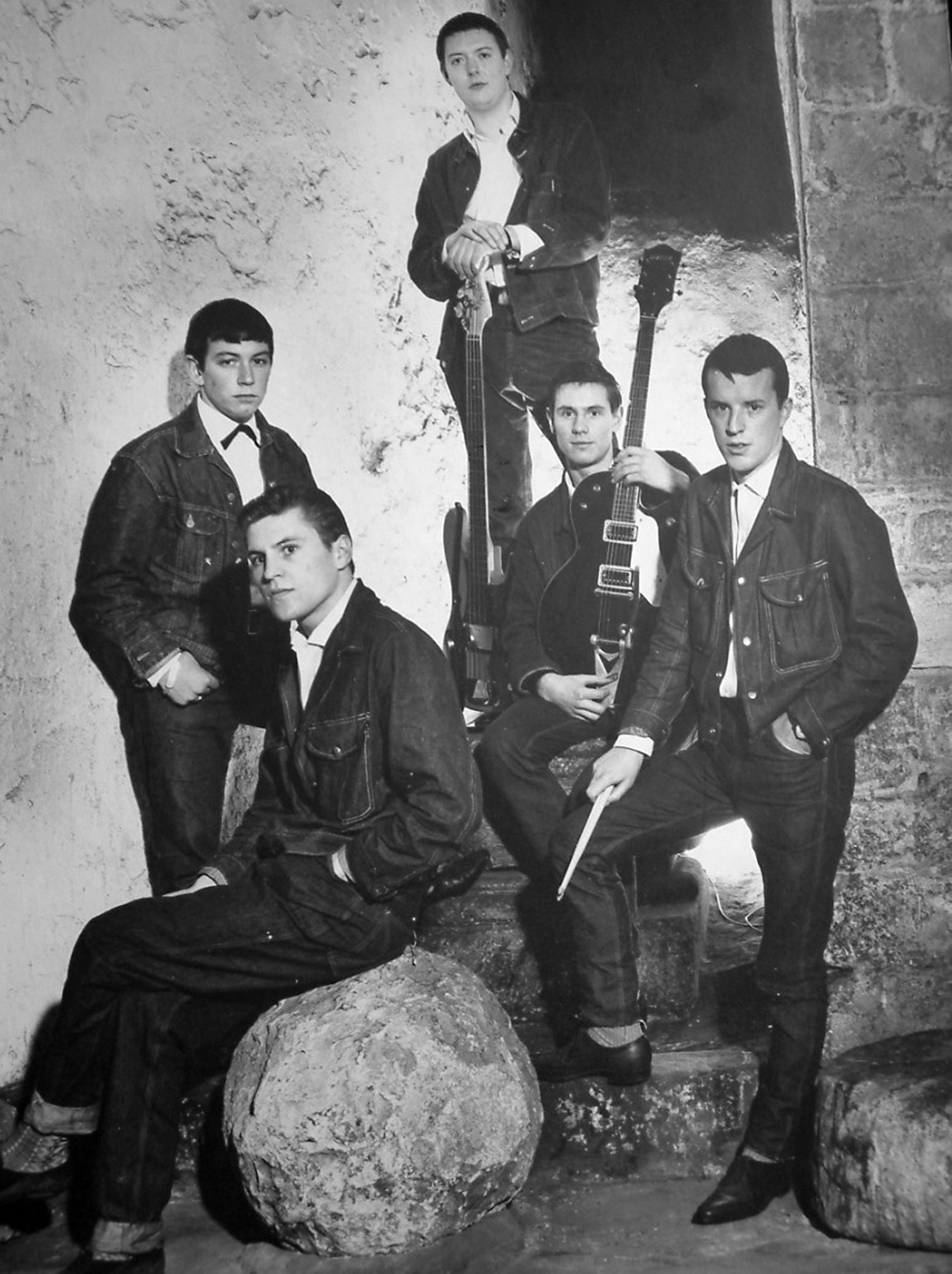
The Animals topped the chart with their version of the traditional song "The House of the Rising Sun".

Chart history
No. (Note: The "No." column indicates the numerical sequence of number ones in Hot 100 history.)	Issue date	Title	Artist(s)	Ref.
103	January 4	"There! I've Said It Again"	Bobby Vinton	
103	January 11	"There! I've Said It Again"	Bobby Vinton	
103	January 18	"There! I've Said It Again"	Bobby Vinton	
103	January 25	"There! I've Said It Again"	Bobby Vinton	
104	February 1	"I Want to Hold Your Hand"	The Beatles	
104	February 8	"I Want to Hold Your Hand"	The Beatles	
104	February 15	"I Want to Hold Your Hand"	The Beatles	
104	February 22	"I Want to Hold Your Hand"	The Beatles	
104	February 29	"I Want to Hold Your Hand"	The Beatles	
104	March 7	"I Want to Hold Your Hand"	The Beatles	
104	March 14	"I Want to Hold Your Hand"	The Beatles	
105	March 21	"She Loves You"	The Beatles	
105	March 28	"She Loves You"	The Beatles	
106	April 4	"Can't Buy Me Love"	The Beatles	
106	April 11	"Can't Buy Me Love"	The Beatles	
106	April 18	"Can't Buy Me Love"	The Beatles	
106	April 25	"Can't Buy Me Love"	The Beatles	
106	May 2	"Can't Buy Me Love"	The Beatles	
107	May 9	"Hello, Dolly!"	Louis Armstrong	
108	May 16	"My Guy"	Mary Wells	
108	May 23	"My Guy"	Mary Wells	
109	May 30	"Love Me Do"	The Beatles	
110	June 6	"Chapel of Love"	The Dixie Cups	
110	June 13	"Chapel of Love"	The Dixie Cups	
110	June 20	"Chapel of Love"	The Dixie Cups	
111	June 27	"A World Without Love"	Peter and Gordon	
112	July 4	"I Get Around"	The Beach Boys	
112	July 11	"I Get Around"	The Beach Boys	
113	July 18	"Rag Doll"	The Four Seasons	
113	July 25	"Rag Doll"	The Four Seasons	
114	August 1	"A Hard Day's Night"	The Beatles	
114	August 8	"A Hard Day's Night"	The Beatles	
115	August 15	"Everybody Loves Somebody"	Dean Martin	
116	August 22	"Where Did Our Love Go"	The Supremes	
116	August 29	"Where Did Our Love Go"	The Supremes	
117	September 5	"The House of the Rising Sun"	The Animals	
117	September 12	"The House of the Rising Sun"	The Animals	
117	September 19	"The House of the Rising Sun"	The Animals	
118	September 26	"Oh, Pretty Woman"	Roy Orbison	
118	October 3	"Oh, Pretty Woman"	Roy Orbison	
118	October 10	"Oh, Pretty Woman"	Roy Orbison	
119	October 17	"Do Wah Diddy Diddy"	Manfred Mann	
119	October 24	"Do Wah Diddy Diddy"	Manfred Mann	
120	October 31	"Baby Love"	The Supremes	
120	November 7	"Baby Love"	The Supremes	
120	November 14	"Baby Love"	The Supremes	
120	November 21	"Baby Love"	The Supremes	
121	November 28	"Leader of the Pack"	The Shangri-Las	
122	December 5	"Ringo"	Lorne Greene	
123	December 12	"Mr. Lonely"	Bobby Vinton	
124	December 19	"Come See About Me"	The Supremes	
125	December 26	"I Feel Fine"	The Beatles	

== Number-one artists ==
List of number-one artists by total weeks at number one
Weeks at No. 1	Artist
18	The Beatles
7	The Supremes
5	Bobby Vinton
3	The Dixie Cups
3	The Animals
3	Roy Orbison
2	Mary Wells
2	The Beach Boys
2	The Four Seasons
2	Manfred Mann
1	Louis Armstrong
1	Peter and Gordon
1	Dean Martin
1	The Shangri-Las
1	Lorne Greene

== See also ==
- 1964 in music
- List of Billboard number-one singles
- List of Billboard Hot 100 top-ten singles in 1964
- List of Billboard Hot 100 number-one singles from 1958 to 1969
