= Bobby Freeman =

American singer (1940–2017)

Background information
- Born: Robert Thomas Freeman; June 13, 1940; Alameda County, California, U.S.
- Died: January 23, 2017 (aged 76) San Francisco, California, U.S.
- Genres: Soul; rhythm and blues; pop
- Occupations: Singer; songwriter; record producer
- Instruments: Vocals; piano; keyboards
- Years active: 1956–2016
- Labels: Dootone; Josie; Double Shot; London; Autumn; Loma; Touch
- Formerly of: The Romancers; The West Coast Vocaleers

Robert Thomas Freeman (June 13, 1940 – January 23, 2017) was an American rock, soul and R&B singer, songwriter and record producer from San Francisco, best known for his two top ten hits, the first in 1958 on Josie Records called "Do You Want to Dance" and the second in 1964 for Autumn Records, "C'mon and Swim".

== Biography ==
Freeman was born in the San Francisco Bay Area and spent much of his youth in San Francisco, California. He attended Mission High School. He started singing in a doo-wop group, the Romancers, in his early teens, and first recorded with them for Dootone Records in 1956. Their recordings included "House Cat", included on several later rock and roll compilations. However, the group soon fell apart, and Freeman started a new group, the Vocaleers (not to be confused with an earlier group of the same name who recorded "Is It a Dream").

When asked by a local DJ if he had written any songs, he wrote several and recorded them as solo demos. These included "Do You Want to Dance", which were heard by a visiting record label executive, Mortimer Palitz of Jubilee Records. He signed Freeman to the label and had the original recording overdubbed in New York by session musicians including guitarist Billy Mure. Released on the Jubilee subsidiary label Josie, "Do You Want to Dance" quickly rose to number 5 on the pop chart and number 2 on the R&B chart in early 1958, when Freeman was still only 17. The song was covered later (as "Do You Wanna Dance") by Del Shannon, the Beach Boys, Johnny Rivers, Bette Midler, John Lennon, Cliff Richard with The Shadows, Marc Bolan & T.Rex, the Mamas & The Papas, Bobby Vee and the Ramones.

Freeman appeared on American Bandstand and toured with such musicians as Fats Domino, the Coasters, and Jackie Wilson. Several of his follow-ups on Josie, including "Betty Lou Got a New Pair of Shoes" and "Need Your Love", a ballad, also made the pop charts. He left Josie in 1960 and signed with King Records, reaching the charts again with "Shimmy Shimmy".

However, several of Freeman's later recordings for King in the early 1960s went unreleased, for unexplained reasons. He did not return to the charts again until 1964, after signing for the Autumn label, when he had his second top ten hit with "C'mon and Swim". The song was co-written by label owner and radio DJ Tom Donahue (credited under his birth name, Thomas Coman) and 20-year-old Sylvester Stewart, later known as Sly Stone, and was produced by Stewart. Freeman's final hit was "S-W-I-M", later in 1964.

In 1964 Bobby Freeman played nightly at the Condor Club in San Francisco, where Carol Doda performed her topless go-go dancing shows. Mainly supporting himself as a singer in clubs by the late 1960s, Freeman continued to release singles on various small local labels through to the mid-1970s but met with little commercial success. Freeman performed at the Bay Area Music ("Bammy") Awards in later years. In 1970s, he was noticed among UK northern soul fans.

== Death ==
Freeman died of natural causes on January 23, 2017, aged 76. He was remembered by SFGate as "the man who became known as San Francisco's first rock 'n' roll star after his song 'Do You Want to Dance' climbed the pop charts in 1958."

== Discography ==
=== Albums ===
- 1958: Do You Wanna Dance (Jubilee)
- 1959: Get in the Swim (Josie)
- 1960: Lovable Style of Bobby Freeman (King)
- 1964: C'mon and Swim (Autumn)

=== Chart singles ===
Year	Title	Chart positions		
Year	Title	US Pop	US R&B	CAN
1958	"Do You Want to Dance"	5	2	1
1958	"Betty Lou Got a New Pair of Shoes"	37	20	27
1958	"Need Your Love"	54	29	–
1959	"Mary Ann Thomas"	90	–	–
1959	"Ebb Tide"	93	–	–
1960	"(I Do the) Shimmy Shimmy"	37	–	–
1961	"The Mess Around"	89	–	–
1964	"C'mon and Swim"	5	*	3
1964	"S-W-I-M"	56	*	–
1965	"I'll Never Fall in Love Again"	131	–	–
1969	"Everybody's Got a Hang Up"	122	–	–

Note: * Billboard did not publish an R&B chart during this period.

== Bibliography ==
- The Rolling Stone Encyclopedia of Rock & Roll, Pareles, Jon & Romanowski, Patricia, eds., Summit Books 1983
