= Poitier Meets Plato =

Studio album by Sidney Poitier, Fred Katz, Henry L. Drake
- Released: 1964
- Genre: Jazz, Spoken Word
- Length: 33:38
- Label: Warner Bros.
- Producer: Jackie Barnett

Poitier Meets Plato is an album recorded by Warner Bros. Records and published by Jackie Barnett. The actor Sidney Poitier recites excerpts from Plato's works over music composed and conducted by Fred Katz. The passages were arranged and selected by Henry L. Drake.

== Track listing ==
(Side 1)

1. "The Philosopher-King Must Rule"

2. "This I Know-That I Know Nothing"

3. "Contribution of Music and Gymnastics"

4. "Immortality of the Soul"

5. "The Greeks Had a Word for it"

(Side 2)

6. "Our World a Cave"

7. "Woman's Place in Society"

8. "Discovery of the Good Life"

9. "Only the Wise are Brave"

10. "The Penalty is Death"
