= Danny Williams (singer) =

South African singer (1942–2005)

Background information
- Born: 7 January 1942; Port Elizabeth, Eastern Cape, South Africa
- Died: 6 December 2005 (aged 63)
- Genres: Traditional pop
- Occupation: Singer
- Instrument: Vocals
- Years active: 1959–2005
- Labels: His Master's Voice

Danny Williams (7 January 1942 – 6 December 2005) was a South African-born British pop singer who earned the nickname "Britain's Johnny Mathis", for his smooth and stylish way with a ballad. He is best known for his 1961 UK number one version of "Moon River" and his 1964 U.S. top ten hit, "White on White".

== Career ==
Born in Port Elizabeth, Eastern Cape, South Africa, Williams won a talent contest at the age of 14 and joined a touring show called Golden City Dixies that played throughout South Africa. In 1959, the show came to London where Williams impressed EMI's Norman Newell, who signed the young singer to a recording contract. He was to spend most of his life in the United Kingdom, where at first he made a few moderately successful singles, mainly popular ballads, before scoring a number-one hit with his cover version of "Moon River" in 1961. To this day, it remains his most famous record; he also scored a No. 8 chart hit with "The Wonderful World of the Young" in April 1962. It led to his appearance in the film Play It Cool (1962), directed by Michael Winner and starring Billy Fury as pop singer Billy Universe, and he also appeared in the Tommy Steele film It's All Happening (1963). In 1963, Williams joined a 20-city tour which starred Helen Shapiro and featured the Beatles as a support act on the bill; like many other ballad singers of the day, he was swept away by the new beat group era.

Williams had no more major British hits, even though "White on White" became popular abroad and was his only US top ten hit, charting in 1964 (No. 9 Pop, No. 3 MOR). He continued to record for His Master's Voice until 1967 while working the nightclub circuit. In 1968, he had a nervous breakdown and was declared bankrupt two years later. However, he resumed his singing career in the early 1970s, achieving a top 30 success with "Dancin' Easy" in 1977. In the early 1990s, he recorded for Prestige Records and subsequently starred in a Nat "King" Cole tribute show which made several British tours. Compilations of his early recordings, including "Moon River", have been issued on CD.

He died in December 2005 of lung cancer, at the age of 63. Williams was married three times, and is survived by his two daughters (Natali and Melody Williams) and two sons, the actor Anthony Barclay and Michael Stewart.

== Discography ==
=== Albums ===
(Record label in parentheses)

- 1961: Danny Williams (His Master's Voice)
- 1962: The Exciting Danny Williams (United Artists)
- 1962: Swinging for You (with Nelson Riddle) (His Master's Voice)
- 1964: With You in Mind (United Artists)
- 1964: White on White (United Artists) (No. 122 US)
- 1966: Romance with Danny Williams (Music for Pleasure)
- 1966: Only Love (His Master's Voice)
- 1968: Danny Williams (Deram)
- 1972: Danny Williams (Contour)
- 1973: I'm a Song – Sing Me (Philips)
- 1975: To Know You Is to Love You (Philips)
- 1977: Anytime Anyplace Anywhere (Philips)

=== Singles ===
Year	Title	UK Position
1961	"We Will Never Be as Young as This Again"	44
1961	"The Miracle of You"	41
1961	"Moon River"	1
1962	"Jeannie"	14
1962	"The Wonderful World of the Young"	8
1962	"Tears"	22
1963	"My Own True Love"	45
1977	"Dancin' Easy"	30

=== Catalogue ===
(Record label in bold)

His Master's Voice

- 1959: "Tall a Tree" / "I Look at You"
- 1959: "So High, So Low" / "My Own True Love"
- 1960: "Youthful Years" / "It Doesn't Matter"
- 1960: "A Million to One" / "Call Me a Dreamer"
- 1961: "We Will Never Be as Young as This Again" / "Passing Breeze"
- 1961: "The Miracle of You" / "Lonely"
- 1961: "Moon River" / "A Weaver of Dreams"
- 1962: "Jeannie" / "It Might as Well Be Spring"
- 1962: "The Wonderful World of the Young" / "A Kind of Loving"
- 1962: "Tears" / "Tiara Tahiti"
- 1963: "My Own True Love" / "Who Can Say?"
- 1963: "More" / "Rhapsody"
- 1963: "The Wild Wind" / "Once Upon a Time"
- 1963: "A Day Without You" / "Secret Love"
- 1963: "How Do You Keep from Crying?" / "Now the Day Is Over"
- 1964: "White on White" / "After You"
- 1964: "Today" / "Lonely in a Crowd"
- 1964: "The Seventh Dawn" / "The World Around Me"
- 1964: "Forget Her, Forget Her" / "Lollipops and Roses"
- 1965: "The Roundabout of Love" / "I Wanna Be Around"
- 1965: "Go Away" / "Masquerade"
- 1965: "Lovely Is She" / "Gone and Forgotten"
- 1965: "And So We Meet Again" / "Violets for Your Furs"
- 1966: "I've Got to Find That Girl Again" / "Throw a Little Lovin' My Way"
- 1966: "Don't Just Stand There" / "Now and Then"
- 1966: "Since You Set Me Free, Baby" / "I Really Don't Know What Hit Me"
- 1966: "Rain (Falling from the Skies)" / "I'm So Lost"

Deram

- 1967: "Never My Love" / "Whose Little Girl Are You"
- 1967: "Love Me" / "When You Were Mine"
- 1968: "Everybody Needs Somebody" / "They Will Never Understand"

Ocean

- 1970: "Fare Ye Well - Separate Ways" / "A Girl Like You"

Philips

- 1973: "I Will Touch You" / "Words of Romance"
- 1973: "So Begins My Life" / "Where Is the Love"
- 1974: "Hey Love" / "Life's a Roundabout"
- 1974: "Every Night I Cry Myself to Sleep" / "Natali"
- 1975: "Ebony Eyes" / "Believe in the Rain"

Ensign

- 1977: "Dancin' Easy" / "No More Cane"
- 1977: "I Hate Hate" / "I Hate Hate (Disco Version)"

Piccadilly

- 1980: "Daddy Write a Letter Soon" / "Give a Little Bit"
