= The Jelly Beans =

1960s R&B group

The Jelly Beans were an American rhythm and blues vocal group from Jersey City, New Jersey, United States. Formed in 1962 by five high schoolers, the group signed with Jerry Leiber and Mike Stoller's label, Red Bird Records, in 1963. Working with songwriters Jeff Barry and Ellie Greenwich, the group released its debut single, "I Wanna Love Him So Bad", in 1964; the song became a hit in the United States, peaking at No. 9 on the Billboard Hot 100 and No. 8 for 2 weeks in Canada. The follow-up, "Baby Be Mine", peaked at No. 51 later that year and No. 31 in Canada, and while the group recorded copiously, an album was never issued. Red Bird dropped the group at the end of 1964; one final single was released on Eskee Records in November 1965, but it fizzled in the US while appearing at No. 36 in Canada and the group broke up in 1966.

== Members ==
- Charles Thomas
- Alma Brewer
- Diane Taylor
- Elyse Herbert
- Maxine Herbert
