= Love Me with All Your Heart =

1964 single by the Ray Charles Singers

"Love Me with All Your Heart" is a popular song, based on the Spanish language song "Cuando calienta el sol", originally composed as "Cuando Calienta El Sol En Masachapa". The music was written by Rafael Gastón Pérez, a Nicaraguan songwriter and bandleader. SADAIC (the Argentine Society of Music Authors and Composers) also credits the Argentine composer, Carlos Albert Martinoli.

The song was made famous first with Spanish lyrics written by the Los Hermanos Rigual (Carlos Rigual and Mario Rigual). The English lyrics are sometimes credited to Michael Vaughn (or Maurice Vaughn) and sometimes to Sunny Skylar. The song was published in 1961. Although both the Spanish and the English versions are love songs, the lyrics are not translations of each other. The Spanish title translates as "When the sun heats (or warms) up".

== Ray Charles Singers recording ==
- A version recorded by The Ray Charles Singers went to number three on the Billboard Hot 100 and spent four weeks at number one on the Pop-Standard singles chart in June 1964.

== Notable recorded versions ==
"Love Me with All Your Heart"

Single by The Ray Charles Singers

from the album Something Special for Young Lovers
- B-side: "Sweet Little Mountain Bird"
- Released: April 1964
- Genre: Doo-wop, easy listening
- Length: 2:20
- Label: Command
- Songwriters: Rafael Gaston Perez, Carlos Albert Martinoli (see text)
- Producer: Enoch Light

The Ray Charles Singers singles chronology
"Autumn Leaves" (1955)	"Love Me with All Your Heart" (1964)	"Al-Di-La" (1964)

"Cuando calienta el sol (Love Me with All Your Heart)"

Single by Sergio Franchi
- A-side: "Chicago"
- Released: 1964
- Label: RCA Victor
- Songwriters: Rafael Gaston Perez, Carlos Albert Martinoli (see text)

- UK singer Karl Denver also had a hit version that reached number 37 in the UK charts in 1964.
- The Bachelors (#38 US Pop, 1966)
- Engelbert Humperdinck, included it on his "We Made It Happen" LP (1970)
- Johnny Rodriguez (#7 US country hit in 1978)

== Charts ==
The Ray Charles Singers
Chart (1964)	Peak position
Canada RPM Top Singles	17
US Billboard Hot 100	3
US Easy Listening (Billboard)	1

== See also ==
- List of number-one adult contemporary singles of 1964 (U.S.)
