= Ken Lane =

American songwriter

- Born: Kermit Lane; December 20, 1912; Brooklyn, New York, U.S.
- Died: November 23, 1996 (aged 83); Lake Tahoe, California, U.S.
- Occupation: Pianist

Kermit "Ken" Lane (December 20, 1912 – November 23, 1996) was an American musician and pianist from Brooklyn, New York. He was best known to audiences as Dean Martin's pianist on The Dean Martin Show in the late 1960s and early 1970s, but was already well known in the film community before that.

With Irving Taylor, Lane co-wrote "Everybody Loves Somebody" in 1947. Frank Sinatra recorded it first, followed by Dinah Washington and Peggy Lee before Martin himself recorded it in 1964 and took it to #1 on the Billboard Hot 100 list in August of that year. It would be Lane's biggest hit as a composer.

He also arranged the music for the feature films Tars and Spars, Monsieur Beaucaire, California, Ladies' Man, Champagne For Two, Smooth Sailing, and Paris In The Spring in 1946 and 1947. He composed the music for Lucy Gets Lucky, a 1975 made-for-TV movie starring Lucille Ball.

Lane had two children: a daughter, Robin Lane, who is a rock singer, with her band "Robin Lane and the Chartbusters", and a son, Christopher "Kit" Robert Lane.

Lane died of emphysema in 1996 in Lake Tahoe, California at the age of 83.
