= Ray Charles (conductor) =

American musician, conductor and arranger (1918–2015)

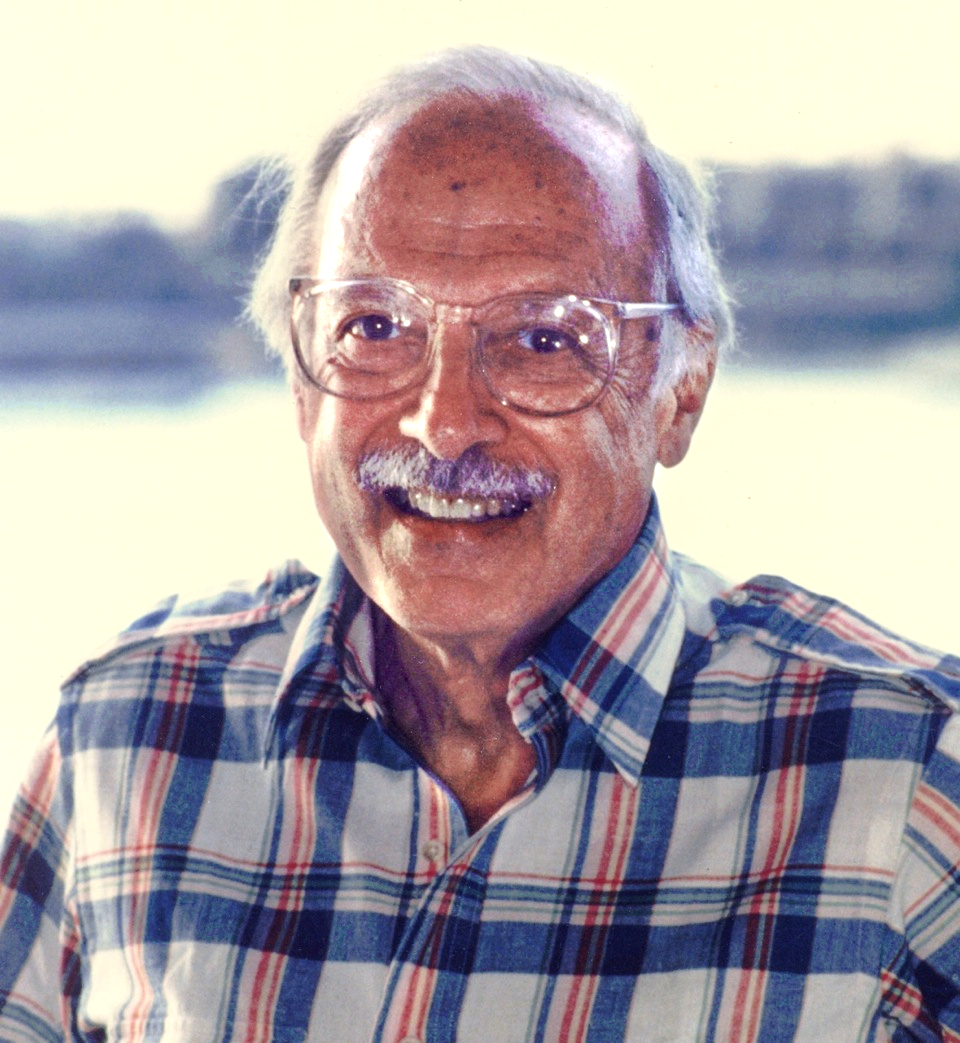
- Charles in 1975

Background information
- Born: Charles Raymond Offenberg; September 13, 1918; Chicago, Illinois, U.S.
- Died: April 6, 2015 (aged 96) Beverly Hills, California, U.S.
- Occupations: Musician, singer, songwriter, arranger, conductor
- Instrument: Vocals
- Years active: 1942–2015
- Labels: Essex; MGM; Decca; Command; Atlantic

Ray Charles (born Charles Raymond Offenberg; September 13, 1918 – April 6, 2015) was an American musician, singer, songwriter, vocal arranger and conductor who was best known as organizer and leader of the Ray Charles Singers, who accompanied Perry Como on his records and television shows for 35 years and were also known for a series of 30 choral record albums produced in the 1950s and 1960s for the MGM, Essex, Decca and Command labels.

As a vocalist, Charles recorded a few duets with Perry Como during the 1950s. In 1977, Charles, along with Julia Rinker Miller, sang the theme song to the television series Three's Company ("Come and Knock on Our Door"). As a songwriter, Charles was best known for the choral anthem "Fifty Nifty United States" in which he set the names of the states to music in alphabetical order. It was originally written for Perry Como's Kraft Music Hall. He is also known for "Letters, We Get Letters", also originally written for Como's show and later used on the Late Show with David Letterman.

In his later years, he continued to serve as a musical consultant to television programs, most notably for 31 years on the Kennedy Center Honors. Charles was acknowledged as an authority on American popular music.

== Biography ==
At the age of 13, Charles Raymond "Chuck" Offenberg (as he was known then) won a contest to sing on the radio in Chicago. At 16, while still at Hyde Park High School, he had his own 15 minute radio program on WENR and won a vocal scholarship to the Chicago Musical College. After graduation, he attended Central YMCA College, where he met fellow future choral director Norman Luboff, who was to become a lifelong friend. In 1936, Offenberg joined the Federal Theater show O Say Can You Sing, sharing a dressing room with the young Buddy Rich. In 1942, Offenberg, with his wife, Bernice, and son, Michael, came to New York City and he started getting work, singing on the radio for Lyn Murray, Ray Bloch and other choral directors.

By 1944, he was doing 10 radio shows a week. At this time, close harmony singing was popular, and Charles became the arranger and tenor for the Double Daters, a vocal quartet featured on Million Dollar Band.

In May 1944, Offenberg changed his name to Ray Charles. This was several years before the rhythm and blues singer Ray Charles first recorded under the same name in the early 1950s. Drafted into the Navy in 1944, Charles was assigned to Hunter College, where he created an entire new music library for the WAVE choruses and trained the "Singing Platoons", three choruses of 80 WAVES each, on six-week training cycles that sang on the radio, bond rallies and at local veterans hospitals. He also conducted the band on their two weekly CBS shows.

Discharged in 1946, Charles sang on New York radio ("Um Um Good" for Campbell's soups among other gigs) and on many record dates. In 1947, he was the conductor for the Broadway hit Finian's Rainbow, and conducted the original cast recording. Charles initially became associated with Perry Como in 1948 through his arrangements for the vocal group the Satisfiers. The group performed on Como's Chesterfield Supper Club. From 1949 to 1951, he was choral arranger-conductor on The Big Show, the last big radio variety show, with Tallulah Bankhead and Meredith Willson. Charles was also a soloist and sang in the choir on Manhattan Merry-Go-Round, Tuesday on Broadway, The Prudential Family Hour, The Celenese Hour, The Schafer Beer Program and The American Melody Hour, and he wrote the theme for Danny Kaye's 7-Up Radio Show.

=== Early television ===
Before its relocation to Los Angeles, Charles did some singing on the radio show Your Hit Parade. In 1950, when the show returned to New York, he became the arranger and conductor of the Hit Paraders, the choral group on the show, first on radio and later when it went to television, for seven years. Charles never got screen credit for his work as arranger and choral director of the Hit Paraders because the sponsor of Your Hit Parade was Lucky Strike and he was already getting a choral-director credit on The Perry Como Chesterfield Show. Lucky Strike and Chesterfield were competitors and Como's Chesterfield show aired three times a week on CBS.

For the next 35 years, the Ray Charles Singers became a fixture on the Perry Como television show. It was a busy time with television's top variety shows, records and commercial jingles. In 1955, the 15-minute Perry Como Show moved back to NBC and became an hour-long program. It was here that he first met the "other" Ray Charles. The Screen Actors Guild normally does not allow two members to have the same name, but Charles the performer was registered as Ray Robinson though he performed as Ray Charles. Charles the composer also wrote special material and did the choral work on Caesar's Hour with Sid Caesar, the successor to Your Show of Shows. In 1959, Charles produced the summer replacement for the Perry Como Show. Allan Sherman ("Hello Muddah, Hello Fadduh"), a friend of Charles', was the head writer. Also on the staff was Andy Rooney. The stars were Tony Bennett (his first series), Teresa Brewer and the Four Lads.

=== The Ray Charles Singers ===
In June 1959, the Ray Charles Singers, a name bestowed on them by Perry Como, began recording a series of albums. Due to advances in recording technology, they were able to create a softer sound than had been heard before and this was the birth of what has been called "easy listening". Record producer Jack Hansen used some of the singers to provide backing vocals for Buddy Holly's last songs, which Holly had composed and recorded shortly before his death in February 1959. The singers' close harmonies behind Holly's lead vocals simulated the sound of Holly's hit records with the Crickets. Six songs resulted from the Hansen sessions, led by the 45-rpm single "Peggy Sue Got Married"/"Crying, Waiting, Hoping".

On a cruise in 1964, Charles heard a Mexican song called "Cuando Calienta el Sol". He liked it, recorded it under the English title "Love Me with All Your Heart", and his recording became a hit, riding to No. 3 on Billboard and No. 2 on Cashbox. This was followed by "Al Di La", also a very popular recording. The Ray Charles Singers were not one group of vocalists. They were different combinations of singers on records, tours and TV shows. What made them the Ray Charles Singers was the conducting and arranging of Ray Charles. The group members included Alan Solokoff, Barbara Nelson, Bob Spiro, Clyde Seckler, Ed Lindstrom, Elise Bretton, Gene Lowell, Gene Steck, Jerry Duane, Lillian Clark, Lois Winter, Marilyn Palmer, Miriam Workman, Murray Kane, Peggy Powers, Rae Whitney, Rudy Williams, and Steve Steck. The group also appeared on Perry Como's television show "The Perry Como Show". They were also the voices behind many commercial jingles.

Charles was nominated for a Grammy for Best Performance by a Chorus at the 3rd Annual Grammy Awards for the 1960 album Deep Night, but lost to his old friend Norman Luboff, who was nominated in the same category for Songs of the Cowboy by the Norman Luboff Choir. He received a total of five Grammy nominations during the 1960s, but never won.

Charles decided to produce a "live" performing group to send on the road with Perry Como. The group of 12 singers opened in Las Vegas at the International Hotel and also opened the show for Como at Harrah's Lake Tahoe.

Charles wrote the music and lyrics for an album produced by the Continental Insurance Company for the 1964 New York World's Fair, titled Cinema '76. It was a companion piece to a 30-minute show about unsung heroes of the American Revolution.

=== Films ===
Charles had also worked on film projects: Funny Lady and Racing With the Moon.

=== West Coast television ===
After years working in television and writing hundreds of jingles, Charles started making trips to the West Coast to seek new employment opportunities. The television industry was changing and migrating to Los Angeles. After a couple of years commuting, in 1968 Charles and his family relocated to Los Angeles, where he produced a Bing Crosby special and worked on The Hollywood Palace. By 1968, The Perry Como Show was doing specials, so Charles could continue working with Como while residing in California. Then Charles wrote and arranged for two seasons of the Glen Campbell Goodtime Hour. In 1971, he suggested to the other Ray Charles that he perform "America the Beautiful" when a guest on the Campbell show. Also that year Charles wrote special material for the first Julie Andrews TV special, with Andrews and Gene Kelly.

Charles became the musical guru to Sha Na Na and guided that show through three seasons. His son, Jonathan, and daughter, Wendy, also worked on the show with their father. Charles, duetting with Julia Rinker, sang the title theme song for the long-running situation comedy Three's Company.

=== The Muppets and Kennedy Center ===
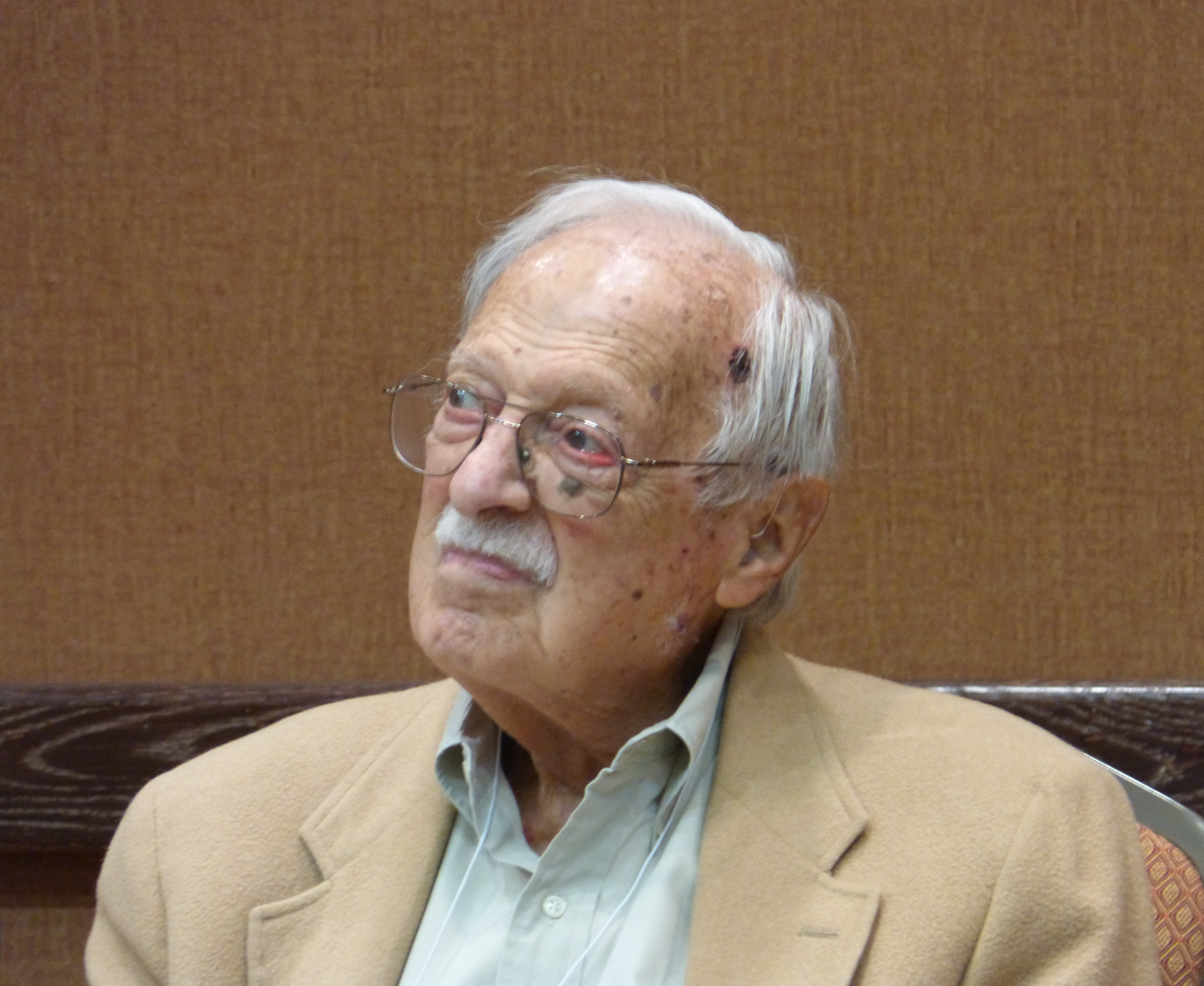
Charles in 2013

Charles eventually went to London to help on The Muppet Show. Writing special material for Carol Burnett and Brooke Shields, among others and working with Miss Piggy and Kermit the Frog, Charles shared an office with Jim Henson, whom Charles considered "a genius".

For 32 years, 1982 through 2014, Charles was the musical consultant of the Kennedy Center Honors and for 14 years performed the same function for the "Fourth of July" and "Memorial Day" concerts on PBS.

Ray Charles won two Emmy Awards for special musical material, music and lyrics for two comedy specials: The Funny Side of Marriage and The First Nine Months. His choral anthem, "Fifty Nifty United States", in which he set the names of the states to music in alphabetical order, is now a staple of school choirs.

He self-deprecatingly billed himself as "the other Ray Charles" in a humorous tribute to the blues singer with whom he worked on several occasions.

For his 90th birthday, Ray gave a concert at the L.A. Jazz Bakery. With the help of female singer Lynn Roberts and an instrumental combo, Ray demonstrated his vocal longevity to a full house by singing his way through the songs of World War II.

== Death ==
Charles died of cancer at the age of 96 on April 6, 2015, in Beverly Hills, California. He was survived by two sons, Michael (born 1941) and Jonathan (born 1946) however his wife Bernice (1916–2002) and daughter Wendy (1950–2004) predeceased him.

Charles donated a collection of his personal papers, including his scripts and musical arrangements for the Kennedy Center Honors galas, to the Great American Songbook Foundation shortly before his death.

== Awards ==
- 1970–71 Television Academy Award Lyrics and Special Material "The First Nine Months are the Hardest"
- 1971–72 Television Academy Award Lyrics and Special Material "The Funny Side of Marriage"
- 2004 Irwin Kostal Tribute Award from ASMAC.
- 2012 Honored as a Broadcasting Legend by the Pacific Pioneers.
- 2013 Foundation Life in Music Award from ASCAP.

== Discography ==
=== Singles ===
Year	Single	Chart positions		Release date
Year	Single	Hot 100	AC	Release date
1955	"Autumn Leaves"	55	–	September 1955
1964	"Love Me With All Your Heart"	3	1	April 1964
1964	"Al-Di-La"	29	4	June 1964
1964	"Till the End of Time"	83	18	June 1964
1964	"One More Time"	32	7	October 1964
1965	"This Is My Prayer"	72	15	February 1965
1965	"My Love, Forgive Me"	124	17	July 1965
1966	"One of Those Songs"	134	13	January 1966
1966	"Promises"	–	39	April 1966
1967	"Step By Step"	–	31	January 1967
1967	"Little By Little and Bit By Bit"	135	6	January 1967
1968	"I Can See It Now"	–	39	February 1968
1970	"Move Me, O Wondrous Music"	99	26	May 1970

=== Albums as the Ray Charles Singers ===
- I Love Essex ESLP 103
- Far Away Places Essex ESLP 110
- Spring Is Here MGM E3162
- Winter Wonderland MGM 3387
- Sing A Song of Paris MGM E3484
- Here We Come A-Caroling MGM E3467
- Here's to My Lady MGM E3568
- Autumn Moods MGM SE4163
- Summertime (Songs for a Lazy Afternoon) MGM E4164
- Love and Marriage Decca DL8787
- Sunrise Serenade Decca DL78835
- In the Evening By the Moonlight Decca DL78874
- We Gather Together Decca DL78940
- Deep Night Decca DL78988
- Something Wonderful Command RS 33 872 1961
- Something Special for Young Lovers Command RS 866 SD
- Al-Di-La & Other Special Songs for Young Lovers Command RS 33–870 SD 1964
- Rome Revisited Command RS 839 SD
- Songs for Lonesome Lovers Command RS 839 SD
- Songs for Latin Lovers Command RS 886 SD 1965
- Paradise Islands Command SH-165
- Young Lovers on Broadway Command RS 890 SD 1965
- One of Those Songs Command RS 898 SD 1966
- What the World Needs Now is Love Command RS 903 SD
- A Special Something... Command RS 914 SD 1967
- At the Movies Command RS 921 SD 1968
- MacArthur Park Command RS SD-936 1969
- Move Me, Oh Wondrous Music Command RS 949-5
- Take Me Along Command RS 526 SD
- Slices of Life Command 9425
- Love Me With All Your Heart the command performance Varèse Sarabande VSD-5626 (CD collection)
- 31 albums with Perry Como

=== Singles ===
- Command-4049‍—‌Al-Di-La/'Til The End of Time‍—‌1964
- Command-4090‍—‌Don't Cry-There's No Place Like Rome‍—‌1967
