= Everybody Loves Somebody =

1947 Coslow/Taylor/Lane song, 1964 Martin hit

Single by Dean Martin

from the album Everybody Loves Somebody
- B-side: "A Little Voice"
- Released: June 1964
- Recorded: 1964
- Studio: United Western, Hollywood
- Genre: Traditional pop
- Length: 2:48
- Label: Reprise
- Songwriters: Irving Taylor, Ken Lane
- Producer: Jimmy Bowen

Dean Martin singles chronology
"La Giostra" (1964)	"Everybody Loves Somebody" (1964)	"The Door Is Still Open to My Heart" (1964)

"Everybody Loves Somebody" is a song written in 1947 by Irving Taylor and pianist Ken Lane, and made famous by Dean Martin who recorded and released his version in 1964.

== History ==
Written almost 20 years earlier, by 1964 the song had already been recorded by several artists. The song was first recorded by Peggy Lee with Dave Barbour and his orchestra on November 20, 1947 for Capitol. Two weeks later Frank Sinatra recorded the song for Columbia with Axel Stordahl conducting the orchestra on December 4, 1947, but was not released and issued until mid- 1948. Though none of the recordings were a success. Lane was playing piano for Dean Martin on his Dream with Dean LP sessions, and with an hour or so of studio time left and one song short, Lane suggested that Martin take a run at his tune. Dean was agreeable, they called Irving Taylor to confirm the correct lyric, and the small combo of piano, guitar, drums, and bass performed a relatively quiet, laid-back version of the song (coincidentally, Martin had sung it almost 20 years earlier on Bob Hope's radio show in 1948, and also on Martin and Lewis's NBC radio program at about the same time). Almost immediately Martin re-recorded the song for his next album, this time with a full orchestra and chorus. His label, Reprise Records, was so enthusiastic about the hit potential of this version they titled the LP Everybody Loves Somebody to capitalize on it.

Although still a major recording artist, Dean Martin had not had a top 40 hit since 1958. With the British Invasion ruling the U.S. charts, few had hopes that an Italian American crooner who had been singing mainly standards for almost 20 years would sway many teenagers. Martin resented rock n' roll, and his attitude created conflict at home with his 12-year-old son Dean Paul Martin, who like many young people at the time worshipped pop groups like The Beatles. He told his son, "I'm gonna knock your pallies off the charts," and on August 15, 1964 he did just that: "Everybody Loves Somebody" knocked The Beatles' "A Hard Day's Night" off the No. 1 slot on Billboard, going straight up to the top of both the Billboard Hot 100 and the Pop-Standard Singles chart, the latter for eight weeks.

It ultimately replaced "That's Amore" as Martin's signature song, and he sang it as the theme of his weekly television variety show from 1965 to 1974. The song has become so identified with Martin that later versions are invariably compared to his take.

"Everybody Loves Somebody Sometime" appears on Martin's grave marker in Los Angeles.

In 1999, the 1964 recording of "Everybody Loves Somebody" on Reprise Records by Dean Martin was inducted into the Grammy Hall of Fame.

Sam Coslow's connection to this work comes from the inadvertent use, by Lane, of a musical phrase in the bridge, which Coslow claimed was plagiarized from his much older song "Midnight Moon." In order to avoid the vagaries of litigation, Taylor and Lane agreed that Coslow could receive a writing credit. There is a document memorializing this agreement.

== Covers ==
Ray Gelato recorded a cover of the song inserted in the 2004 self-titled album (T2, TWR0131-2), released in the UK.

In 1965 the Danish trio, 3 Jacks, had recorded a Danish version called "Alle og enhver kan blive forelsket" (Any and everyone can fall in love). It never became a hit. In 1975 Danish singer Gustav Winckler recorded a Danish version called "Gem et lille smil til det bli'r gråvejr" (Save a little smile 'till it's rainy). This became a big hit, and was released on Wincklers 25 years anniversary album.

== Charts ==
Frank Sinatra

Chart (1948)	Peak position
US Billboard Pop-Standard Singles	25

Dean Martin

Chart (1964)	Peak position
Australia - Music Maker	3
Canada - RPM Top 40-5s	8
Canada - CHUM Hit Parade	3
Belgium (Flanders)	5
Germany	20
New Zealand - "Lever Hit Parade"	1
Norway - VG-lista	10
UK - Record Retailer	11
US Billboard Hot 100	1
US Billboard Pop-Standard Singles	1
US Cash Box Top 100	1

== Certifications ==
Certifications for "Everybody Loves Somebody"
Region	Certification	Certified units/sales
New Zealand (RMNZ)	Gold	15,000^{‡}
United Kingdom (BPI)	Silver	200,000^{‡}
United States (RIAA)	Platinum	1,000,000^{‡}
^{‡} Sales+streaming figures based on certification alone.
