= Hello, Dolly! (song) =

Single by Louis Armstrong

from the album Hello, Dolly!
- B-side: "A Lot of Livin' to Do"
- Released: January 1964
- Recorded: 1963
- Studio: Columbia 30th Street, New York City
- Genre: Dixieland jazz
- Length: 2:27
- Label: Kapp
- Songwriter: Jerry Herman
- Producer: Michael Kapp

Louis Armstrong singles chronology
"Mack the Knife" (1962)	"Hello, Dolly!" (1964)	"What a Wonderful World" (1967)

Professional ratings
Review scores
Source	Rating
Billboard	positive (a "Pop spotlight" pick)

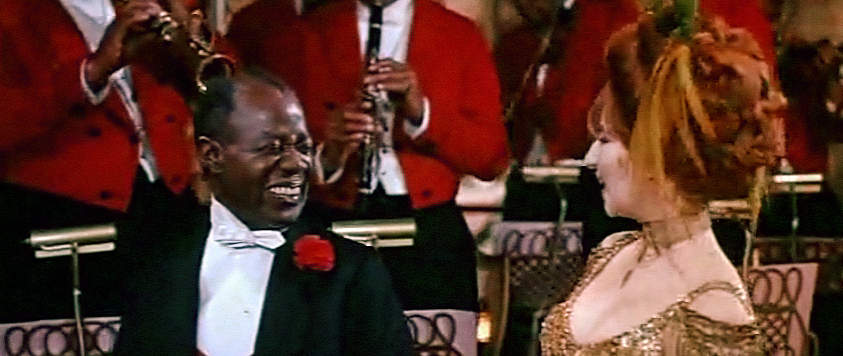
Louis Armstrong as the orchestra leader with Barbra Streisand, singing the song in the 1969 film.

"Hello, Dolly!" is the title song of the popular musical of the same name, with music and lyrics by Jerry Herman.

A recording by Louis Armstrong released in 1964 was a widely popular success, winning the Song of the Year and Male Vocal Performance awards at the 7th Annual Grammy Awards. Armstrong's rendition was inducted into the Grammy Hall of Fame in 2001.

== History ==
At the behest of his manager, Louis Armstrong made a demonstration recording of "Hello, Dolly!" in December 1963, for the song's publisher to use to promote the Broadway show.

In January 1964, the same month Hello, Dolly! opened in New York City, Kapp Records released Armstrong's publishing demo as a commercial single. His version reached No. 1 on the U.S. Billboard Hot 100, ending the Beatles' streak of 3 chart-topping hits in a row over 14 consecutive weeks.

"Hello Dolly!" became the most successful single of Armstrong's career, followed by a Gold-selling album of the same name. The song also spent nine weeks atop the adult contemporary chart shortly after the opening of the musical. The song also for nearly 60 years made Armstrong the oldest artist ever to reach No. 1 on the Hot 100, before Brenda Lee broke the record at age 78 when her 1958 holiday single "Rockin' Around the Christmas Tree" reached the top spot in December 2023. Billboard ranked the record as the No. 3 song of 1964, behind the Beatles' "I Want to Hold Your Hand" and "She Loves You".

"Hello, Dolly!" won the Grammy Award for Song of the Year in 1965, and Armstrong received a Grammy for Best Vocal Performance, Male. Louis Armstrong also performed the song alongside Barbra Streisand for the musical's 1969 screen adaptation. In 2018, the song was listed at number 178 on the Billboard Hot 100 60th Anniversary chart. There were other charting versions of the song also in 1964 by Kenny Ball, Frankie Vaughan, The Batchelors and Frank Sinatra. Liberace also recorded a vocal version of the song.

== "Hello, Lyndon!" ==
Lyndon B. Johnson used the tune, rechristened "Hello, Lyndon!", as a campaign song for his run in the 1964 U.S. presidential election. This version of the song was performed by Carol Channing at that year's Democratic National Convention, and a recording was made by Ed Ames for distribution at the convention.

== The "Sunflower" controversy ==
"Hello, Dolly!" became caught up in a lawsuit which could have endangered plans for filming the musical. Mack David, a composer, sued for infringement of copyright, because the first four bars of "Hello, Dolly!" were the same as those in the refrain of David's song "Sunflower" from 1948. As he recounts in his memoirs, Herman had never heard "Sunflower" before the lawsuit, and wanted a chance to defend himself in court, but, for the sake of those involved in the show and the potential film, he reluctantly agreed to pay a settlement before the case would have gone to trial.

== In popular culture ==
- In 1984, Carol Channing sang a parody of the song on Sesame Street called "Hello, Sammy!", a love song to a character known as Sammy the Snake (as voiced by its creator, Jim Henson). Carol tells Sammy just how much she loves and adores him while Sammy coils himself around Carol's arms. They are soon joined by four giant, swaying letter S's wearing a top hats. Carol ends the song by telling Sammy how much she'd miss his hisses if they ever parted.
