= Cocaine Blues =

1948 single by Roy Hogsed

Single by Roy Hogsed
- Released: June 1948
- Recorded: 1947
- Genre: Western swing, murder ballad
- Label: Coast
- Songwriter: Troy Junius Arnall

"Cocaine Blues" is a Western swing song written by Troy Junius Arnall, a reworking of the traditional song "Little Sadie." Roy Hogsed recorded a well known version of the song in 1947.

== Background ==
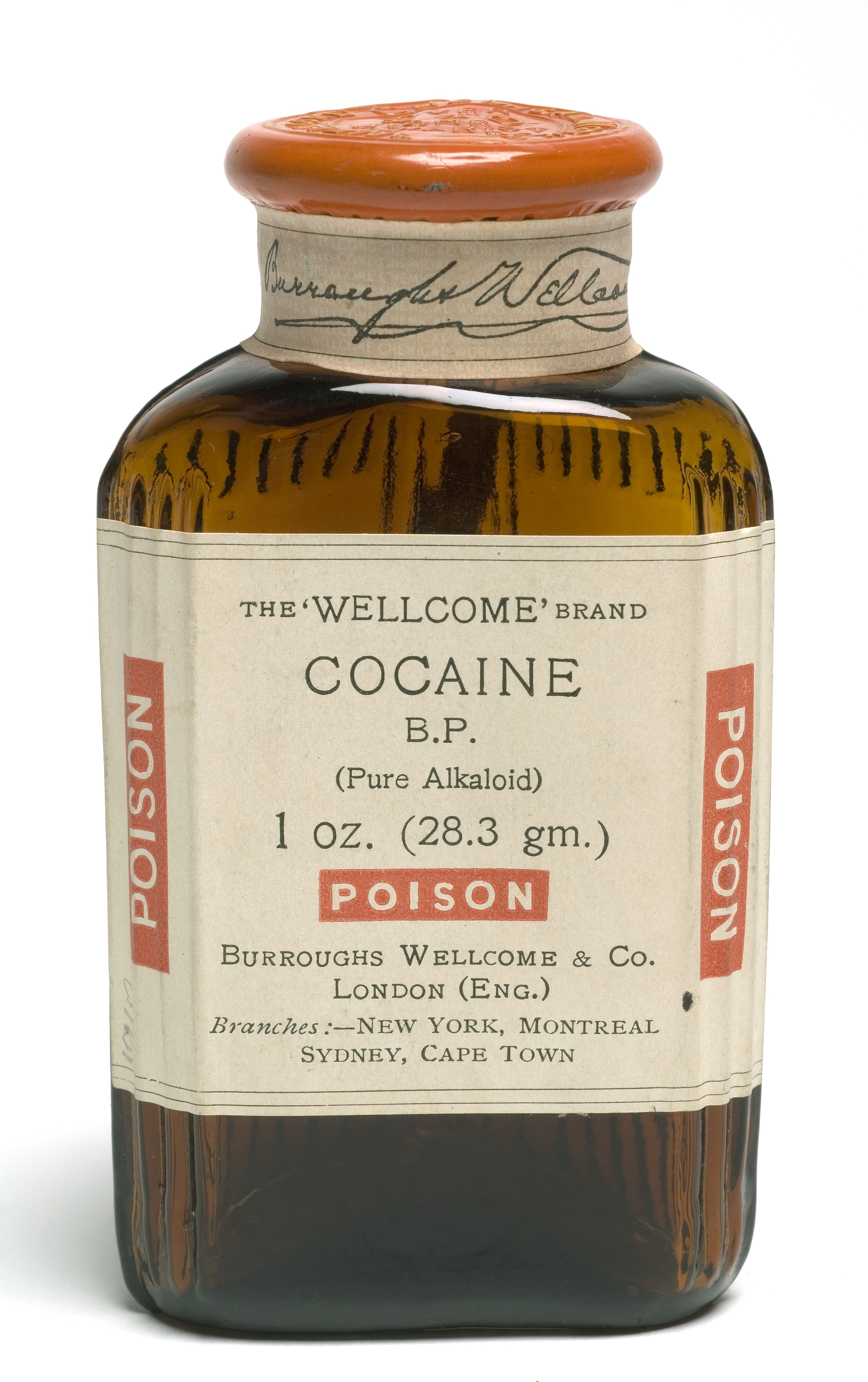
A container of Wellcome-brand cocaine, 1948.

The song is the tale of a man, Willy Lee, who murders his unfaithful girlfriend while under the influence of whiskey and cocaine. He flees to Mexico and works as a musician to fund his continued drug use. Willy is apprehended by a sheriff from Jericho Hill, tried, and promptly sentenced to "ninety-nine years in the San Quentin Pen". The song ends with Willy imploring the listener:

Come on you hypes listen unto me,
lay off that whiskey, and let that cocaine be.

== Early recordings ==
Lyrically based upon the turn of the century, traditional, folk song "Little Sadie", the popular version of this song was originally recorded by W. A. Nichol's Western Aces (vocal by "Red" Arnall) on the S & G label, probably in 1947, and by Roy Hogsed and the Rainbow Riders May 25, 1947, at Universal Recorders in Hollywood, California. Hogsed's recording was released on Coast Records (262) and Capitol (40120), with the Capitol release reaching number 15 on the country music charts in 1948.

== Johnny Cash versions ==
"Cocaine Blues [Explicit]"

Song by Johnny Cash

from the album At Folsom Prison
- Released: May 1968
- Recorded: January 13, 1968
- Genre: Rockabilly
- Length: 3:01
- Label: Columbia
- Songwriter: T.J. Arnall
- Producer: Bob Johnston

Johnny Cash famously performed the song at his 1968 Folsom Prison concert. He replaced the lyric "San Quentin" with "Folsom", and changed "C'mon you hypes..." to "C'mon you gotta listen unto me...", as well as using the then-provocative lyric "I can't forget the day I shot that bad bitch down." Cash also altered the last line to "Lay off the whiskey..." instead of "Drink all you want...". During the performance, which was released uncensored by Columbia Records in 1968 (though other language is censored), Cash can be heard coughing occasionally; later in the concert recording, he can be heard noting that singing the song nearly did his voice in.

The song was also featured on Cash's 1960 Columbia album Now, There Was a Song! under the title "Transfusion Blues" substituting the line "took a shot of cocaine" with "took a transfusion" along with some other minor lyrical changes (and a tamer version of the climactic lyric "I can't forget the day I shot my woman down"). Cash later recorded "Cocaine Blues" for his 1979 album Silver. Cash chose not to use the word "bitch" in this version.

Cocaine Blues excerpt as performed by Johnny Cash
Taken from the album At Folsom Prison

Cash also performed the song – with original lyrics and the use of the word "bitch" – for his December 1969 performance at Madison Square Garden, which was recorded but withheld from release until Johnny Cash at Madison Square Garden was released by Columbia Records in 2002.

Cash's Folsom Prison performance of "Cocaine Blues" was portrayed by Joaquin Phoenix in the 2005 Cash biographical film Walk the Line. The film version, edited down to make it shorter, fades into the next scene before the line "I can't forget the day I shot that bad bitch down" is sung. The DVD specials include an extended version of the song with the lyric, and the full, unedited version (apparently a different "take") is found on the soundtrack CD.

== Other versions ==
Arnall is also sometimes credited with the version of "Cocaine Blues" written and recorded by Billy Hughes (also in 1947). The music is similar, bearing a marked resemblance to 'Little Sadie", however the lyrics in Hughes' vary considerably from Arnall's. For instance, Hughes has the Cocaine Kid, not Willy Lee, killing "his woman and a rounder, too" in Tulsa, being captured in El Paso, and sentenced to "ninety-nine years way down in Mac." It ends with:

For you'll become an addict and blow your lid.
Take a look at what it did to the Cocaine Kid.

George Thorogood recorded a version of "Cocaine Blues" on his 1978 album Move It On Over.

Hank Thompson recorded a version of "Cocaine Blues" on his 1959 album Songs for Rounders.

Hank Williams III also recorded a version for his album Risin' Outlaw.

== Other songs titled "Cocaine Blues" ==
"Cocaine Habit Blues"/"Take a Whiff on Me"

Another song is often known as "Cocaine Blues" but is completely different; it is also known, in its different versions, as "Take a Whiff on Me" and "Cocaine Habit Blues". This song has three families of variants.

"Cocaine Blues"/"Coco Blues"

One of the most familiar, usually known as "Cocaine Blues," is Reverend Gary Davis’s arrangement, an eight-bar blues in C Major. Davis said that he learned the song in 1905 from a traveling carnival musician, Porter Irving. This version is made up of rhyming couplets, followed by a refrain "Cocaine, running all around my brain" or "Cocaine, all around my brain"). The song is sometimes known as "Coco Blues," as on Davis’ 1965 album Pure Religion and Bad Company.

Gary Davis was a key influence on the folk revival singers of the early 1960s, including Dave Van Ronk, who learned this version of "Cocaine Blues" from Davis (it features on his 1963 album Folksinger) and Bob Dylan (a 1961 variant features on The Minnesota Tapes, a 1962 variant is on Gaslight Tapes and a third version performed live in 1997 is on the more recent compilation album Tell Tale Signs). On Van Ronk's record, the song is wrongly credited to Luke Jordan, who recorded a completely different song of the same name, see below.

Davis' version of "Cocaine Blues" was subsequently recorded by a number of artists in the folk revival/singer-songwriter tradition, including Ramblin' Jack Elliott (1958 on Jack Takes the Floor and 1995 on South Coast), Richard Fariña and Eric Von Schmidt (1963), Hoyt Axton (1963, on Thunder 'n Lightnin), Davey Graham (1964, on Folk, Blues and Beyond), John Martyn (1967, on London Conversation), Nick Drake (on Tanworth-in-Arden 1967–68 and Family Tree), Led Zeppelin played a version in concert at Budokan, Tokyo, 1971, Jackson Browne (1977, on Running on Empty), Stefan Grossman (1978, on Acoustic Guitar), Townes Van Zandt (1977, on Live at the Old Quarter and 1993, on Roadsongs), as well as by the punk band UK Subs and live by Cryin' D.T. Buffkin and his band the Bad Breath. "Sweet Cocaine" by Fred Neil (1966) is loosely based on the same song, same is Small Faces and Humble Pie singer Steve Marriott's "Cocaine", recorded in 1971 and released on the 1998 compilation album Steve Marriott's Scrubbers. German singer-songwriter Hannes Wader covered the song as "Kokain" on his 1972 album 7 Lieder (Seven Songs), with the English chorus and new verses in German. The refrain, "Cocaine runnin’ all 'round my brain," was used by reggae artist Dillinger in "Cocaine In My Brain" ("I've got cocaine runnin' around my brain") and more recently in turn by hip hop group Poor Righteous Teachers in the song "Miss Ghetto" on the album The New World Order ("She's like cocaine, running around my brain/Miss Ghetto be like cocaine, running around your brain").

In 2013 Los Angeles skate-punk band FIDLAR recorded a version titled "Cocaine" on their eponymous debut album. This rendition was featured on the Grand Theft Auto V soundtrack. English indie rock singer Kate Nash covered this version, changing the title to "Girl Gang."

"Take a Whiff on Me"

Secondly, "Take a Whiff on Me" (again often known as "Cocaine Blues") shares chords and many rhyming couplets with this song, but with the refrain "Honey, take a whiff on me" instead of "Cocaine runnin’ all 'round my brain". This version is most strongly associated with Lead Belly, whose version opens with "Walked up Ellum and I come down Main." ("Ellum", "Elem" and "Dep Elem" in various version, refers to Elm Street in Dallas, in that city's red light district). The song was first published by John Lomax in 1934 as "Honey, Take a Whiff on Me". Lomax stated that its origins were uncertain.

Variants on the Lead Belly version have been recorded by Blind Jesse Harris (1937), Woody Guthrie, Roy Book Binder, Merle Travis, The Byrds (1970), Mungo Jerry (as "Have a Whiff on Me", 1971 single), Old Crow Medicine Show ("Cocaine Habit" from their 2006 album Big Iron World), The White Stripes, Abner Jay, and others.

"Take a Drink on Me"

The song "Take a Drink with Me"/”Take a Drink on Me", recorded by white old-time music performer Charlie Poole in 1927 and collected by various folklorists, is a variant on "Take A Whiff On Me", with alcohol rather than cocaine as the drug of choice. This in turn has been performed by a number of artists in the folk music and country music traditions, including the New Lost City Ramblers. It shares some words with Frank Hutchison's 1927 ballad "Coney Isle".

"Cocaine Habit Blues"

A third, very closely related to this version is the one also commonly known as "Cocaine Habit Blues", recorded by the Memphis Jug Band in 1930 (credited to Jennie Mae Clayton). It was a jug band standard, later recorded by the Panama Limited Jug Band and by Jerry Garcia in Mother McCree's Uptown Jug Champions in 1964. Its introductory verse is "Oh cocaine habit mighty bad".

"Croquet Habits"

This disguised version of "Cocaine Habit Blues" was recorded by Freeny's Barn Dance Band in 1930. After the first verse, there is no similarity in the lyrics.

"Tell It to Me"

Another traditional song often known as "Cocaine Blues". Also called "Let The Cocaine Be", some musicologists see a relationship to "Take A Whiff On Me" since some versions share the same lines. It has a similar structure to "Take a Whiff"/"Cocaine Habit Blues", and some versions share couplets (e.g. "Cocaine's [dose] is not for a man/Doctor said will kill you, but he don't say when" and "You know I walked down Fifth and I turned down Main/Looking for a nickel for to buy cocaine"), but the refrain is darker: "Cocaine that killed my honey dead".

A version was collected (as “Cocaine”) by folklorist Mellinger Edward Henry (1873–1946) in his Folk Songs from the Southern Highlands from the singing of Barnet George, Lithonia, Georgia, July 1931. The earliest recorded version is by white Tennessee band The Grant Brothers in 1928 (Columbia 15332-D). It has been recorded by numerous folk revival artists, including David Grisman and the New York City Ramblers at the Newport Folk Festival. Grisman collaborated with the Grateful Dead in 1970, and they included it in their live repertoire at that time. It has more recently been covered by Old Crow Medicine Show and White Ghost Shivers.

"Cocaine Done Killed My Baby"

This song recorded by Mance Lipscomb has the same refrain, but lacks the "Tell it to me" theme.

"Cocaine"

Another song of the same title (sometimes called simply "Cocaine" or "Simply Wild About My Good Cocaine") was recorded by bluesman Luke Jordan in 1927 as "Cocaine Blues", interspersed with verses from another song "Furniture Man". White singer Dick Justice recorded a cover under the title "Cocaine" in 1929. It copied all of Jordan's text, including the "Furniture Man" verses. In 1930, The Kentucky Ramblers sang most of Jordan's version (including the "Furniture Man" verses) as the first part of a medley entitled "Good Cocaine (Mama Don't Allow It)". David Bromberg recorded a version as "Cocaine Blues"; it was recorded under the same name by the Holy Modal Rounders on their 1967 album Indian War Whoop. The Luke Jordan lyrics share some lines ("Cocaine's for horses and not for men/Doctor says it'll kill you but don't know when") with "Take a Whiff on Me" as recorded by Lead Belly and the Reverend Gary Davis version of "Cocaine Blues" as recorded by Bob Dylan.

“Whiskey Blues”

Another title for the song as sung by Australia’s King of Country Slim Dusty, who rewrote some of the song to make it Australian which he recorded and released in on his first album in 1946 called Regal Zonophone Label.

== See also ==
- "Cocaine" by JJ Cale (1976), made famous by Eric Clapton

== Bibliography ==
- Kemper, Wolf-Reinhard. Kokain in der Musik: Bestandsaufnahme und Analyse aus kriminologischer Sicht. Berlin-Hamburg-Münster: LIT Verlag, 2001 ISBN 3-8258-5316-0, ISBN 978-3-8258-5316-7
- Kienzle, Rich. Southwest Shuffle: Pioneers of Honky Tonk, Western Swing, and Country Jazz. New York: Routledge, 2003. ISBN 0-415-94102-4
- Lomax, John A. American Ballads & Folk Songs. 1934.
- Russell, Tony. Country Music Records: A Discography, 1921–1942. Oxford University Press, 2004. ISBN 0-19-513989-5
- Tullos, Allen. Long Journey Home: Folklife in the South. Southern Exposure, 1977.
- Waltz, Robert B; David G. Engle. "Take a Whiff on Me". The Traditional Ballad Index: An Annotated Bibliography of the Folk Songs of the English-Speaking World. Hosted by California State University, Fresno, Folklore, 2007
