= Detour (song) =

"Detour (There's a Muddy Road Ahead)"

Song by Jimmy Walker
- Released: 1945
- Genre: Western swing
- Songwriter: Paul Westmoreland

"Detour (There's a Muddy Road Ahead)" is a Western swing ballad written by Paul Westmoreland in 1945. The original version was by Jimmy Walker with Paul Westmoreland and His Pecos River Boys, issued around the beginning of November 1945.

== Background ==
Westmoreland wrote the song while traveling to Murphy, North Carolina. He debuted the song in the neighboring town of Hayesville.

The title comes from the repetition of detour in the chorus:

Detour, there's a muddy road ahead.
Detour, paid no mind to what it said.
Detour, all these bitter things I find.
Should have read that detour sign.

Written in the first person, the song tells of the singer's regrets for the choices made in life.

Headed down life's crooked road
Lots of things I never knowed,
And because of me not knowin', I now pine.
Trouble got in the trail,
Spent the next five years in jail,
Should have read that detour sign.
(chorus)

== 1946 recordings ==
- Spade Cooley (Columbia 36935), with Tex Williams on vocals, had a big hit with it in 1946, spending 11 weeks on the country charts, reaching number two.
- Other artist scoring big with the song in 1946 included Wesley Tuttle, number three Elton Britt, number five, and Foy Willing, number six.

== Other versions ==
- A well-known version of the song was the popular recording by Patti Page in 1951. It was released by Mercury Records as catalog number 5682, and first entered the Billboard chart on August 4, 1951, staying for 16 weeks and peaking at number five.
- Bill Haley & His Comets for the album Haley's Juke Box (1960; not released as a single)
- Hank Thompson and His Brazos Valley Boys on the 1964 album Golden Country Hits
- Dean Martin on his 1965 album Houston
- Instrumental version was recorded by Duane Eddy, on his album Have 'Twangy' Guitar Will Travel (1958).
- Willie Nelson and Leon Russell on the album One For The Road (1979; not released as a single, album charted #3 on Billboard country)
- In 2016, American singer Cyndi Lauper recorded "Detour" with Emmylou Harris for her album Detour.

== Popular culture ==
- In its various versions, it is the Theme music of the Radio program, "Detour, The Folk, Roots, and World Music Show".
