= Somewhere There's a Someone (song) =

- Dutch release picture sleeve

Single by Dean Martin

from the album Somewhere There's a Someone
- B-side: "That Old Clock on the Wall"
- Released: February 1966
- Genre: Pop
- Length: 2:14
- Label: Reprise; G-0443
- Songwriter: Baker Knight
- Producer: Jimmy Bowen

Dean Martin singles chronology
"I Will" (1965)	"Somewhere There's a Someone" (1966)	"Come Running Back" (1966)

Professional ratings
Review scores
Source	Rating
Record World	4/5 stars
Billboard	Positive (Hot Pop)

"Somewhere There's a Someone" is a song written by Baker Knight, which was released in 1966 by Dean Martin.

== Release and reception ==
"Somewhere There's a Someone" was released as a seven-inch single in February 1966 by Reprise Records. It was backed by another country-pop style song, "That Old Clock on the Wall" on the B-side, which was included on Martin's Somewhere There's a Someone album, along with the title track. Both songs were produced by Jimmy Bowen and arranged by Ernie Freeman.

The single was met with a positive critical reception upon its release. Billboard magazine said that the "With the feel and sound of "Everybody Loves Somebody," Martin has a strong contender for a big chart winner." Record World said that it is a "wingalong tune that Dean does to sax accompaniment. Another in his list of amiable numbers.".

== Chart performance ==
Debuting on February 12, 1966, the song spent eight weeks on the Billboard Hot 100 chart, peaking at No. 32, while reaching No. 2 on Billboard's Easy Listening chart, during a longer thirteen-week run on it. On another American music magazine, Cashbox, the single peaked at No. 34 on their Top 100 Singles chart during a seven-week run. In Canada, the song reached No. 44 on the RPM 100, and peaked at No. 9 on RPM's "GMP Guide". On the Canadian CHUM Hit Parade the single reached No. 17.

The song was ranked No. 18 on Billboard's ranking of "Top Easy Listening Singles" of 1966.

== Charts ==
=== Weekly charts ===
Chart (1966)	Peak position
US Billboard Hot 100	32
US Billboard Easy Listening	2
US Cashbox Top 100 Singles	34
Canada - RPM 100	44
Canada - RPM - GMP Guide	9
Canada - CHUM Hit Parade	17

=== Year-end charts ===
Chart (1966)	Year-end Rank
US Easy Listening	18

== Track listing ==
7" vinyl single

- "Somewhere There's a Someone" - 2:14
- "That Old Clock on the Wall" – 3:00
