= Jimmy Walker (country musician) =

American country music singer

Ernest Earl "Jimmy" Walker (December 18, 1915 – June 27, 1990) was an American country musician.

Jimmy Walker recorded the first version of the country standard "Detour" in 1945, and to date he is the only man who ever replaced Roy Acuff on the Grand Ole Opry. He also recorded numerous other western swing-honky tonk numbers, appeared as a regular on Midwestern Hayride, WWVA Jamboree and Louisiana Hayride, and appeared in several motion pictures.

== Biography ==
Born Ernest E. Walker in Mason County, West Virginia, on December 18, 1915, "Jimmy" did not opt for a regular musical career until the mid-1940s. By this time, he had relocated to the West Coast which then was a booming region for country dance music. At his first record session he waxed the hit song "Detour." The song's author, Paul Westmoreland, played steel guitar on the recording. A year later, Grand Ole Opry officials hired him to replace Roy Acuff who took an extended leave. At the time, they were much impressed not only with "Detour" but also "Sioux City Sue" and another song entitled "Oh Why." Unfortunately for Walker, Acuff chose to return to the Opry after a year. His recordings during that period (1945–47), all made in Los Angeles, featured such musicians as Noel Boggs on steel guitar, Tex Atchison on fiddle, Cliffie Stone on bass, and Merle Travis on lead guitar.

Meanwhile, Walker moved on to serve stints of roughly a year and a half each on WLW Cincinnati's Midwestern Hayride and WWVA Wheeling's "World's Original Jamboree." In 1949, he returned to California and made some more recordings for another independent label. These sessions again featured Atchison and also Joe Maphis on lead guitar and Speedy West on steel. Other musicians who appeared in Walker sessions included Pedro DePaul and George Bamby on accordions (both veterans of the Spade Cooley band), and guitarist Charlie Morgan, the brother of pop vocal star Jaye P. Morgan. By 1951, he had recorded 28 sides. Later in the decade, he had sessions for two major labels and another independent studio visit in 1965. All were examples of the mainstream honky-tonk sound that dominated the country field before the rise of the Nashville sound. Meanwhile, Walker returned to the WWVA Jamboree in 1953 remaining for more than a decade. During this time one of his songs "Unkind Words" recorded by Jamboree vocalist Kathy Dee made the "Billboard Top 20" in 1964, but the royalties never reached him.

In the mid-1960s, Walker returned to California to work as a country singer and motion picture actor. One of the better-known films in which he played a character role was the Lee Marvin - Clint Eastwood picture, "Paint Your Wagon." Retiring in the late 1970s, Walker came back to his boyhood home in Mason County, West Virginia, but continued to play many clubs and other show dates and kept up contacts with old friends such as Tex Atchison and Merle Travis.

Walker died in 1990, at the age of 74.
