= The Hit Sound of Dean Martin =

Studio album by Dean Martin
- Released: August 1966
- Recorded: 1966
- Genres: Traditional pop, country
- Length: 29:28
- Labels: Reprise; R 6213
- Producer: Jimmy Bowen

Dean Martin chronology
Dean Martin Sings Songs from "The Silencers" (1966)	The Hit Sound of Dean Martin (1966)	The Dean Martin Christmas Album (1966)

The Hit Sound of Dean Martin is the twentieth studio album by Dean Martin arranged by Ernie Freeman and Billy Strange.

This was the third of five albums that Martin released in 1966, that year he also starred in three films and appeared in his own television show. The Hit Sound of Dean Martin peaked at 50 on the Billboard 200, and was still on the charts in the second week of February 1967. In contrast to the chart performance of his recent LP's, The Hit Sound of Dean Martin marked a waning in his chart popularity as it only became his first LP since 1964's Everybody Loves Somebody not to go gold.

The album combines newly recorded material with previously issued singles and B sides. The album featured Martin's singles "Come Running Back" and "A Million and One", respectively Top 40 pop and Top Five easy listening hits, with six newly recorded songs. "Shades" by Lee Hazlewood that appears on the album had previously been issued as the B side to "A Million and One". Two tracks, "Any Time" and "Ain't Gonna Try Anymore," from this album had been released originally on Martin's 1963 album Dean "Tex" Martin: Country Style. The song "Any Time" was appearing for the third time on an LP by Martin, having also featured on his album Somewhere There's a Someone, released earlier in 1966.

The Hit Sound of Dean Martin was reissued on CD by Hip-O Records in 2009.

== Reception ==
Professional ratings
Review scores
Source	Rating
Allmusic	2.5/5 stars

William Ruhlmann on Allmusic.com gave the album two and a half stars out of five. Ruhlmann commented on Martin's country music style writing that "The new songs, as usual arranged in a style that would define them as country music if they had been recorded in Nashville by a singer with more of a twang in his voice, were no great shakes".

== Track listing ==
Side One:

1. "A Million and One" (Yvonne DeVaney) – 2:56
2. "Don't Let the Blues Make You Bad" (Billy Mize) – 2:05
3. "Any Time" (Herbert "Happy" Lawson) – 2:20
4. "One Lonely Boy" (Baker Knight) – 2:22
5. "I'm Living in Two Worlds" (Jan Crutchfield) – 2:38
6. "Come Running Back" (Dick Glasser) – 2:07

Side Two:

1. "Shades" (Lee Hazlewood) – 2:21
2. "Today Is Not the Day" (Mary Taylor) – 2:01
3. "Terrible, Tangled Web" (Mize) – 2:09
4. "Nobody But a Fool (Would Love You)" (Bill Anderson) – 2:11
5. "Ain't Gonna Try Anymore" (Clint Ballard) – 2:18

== Personnel ==
- Dean Martin – vocals
- Ernie Freeman – arranger
- Billy Strange – conductor
- Ed Thrasher – art direction
- Eddie Brackett – engineer
- Jimmy Bowen – producer
