= Almost Free =

Studio album by Fidlar
- Released: January 25, 2019
- Recorded: 2017–2018
- Studios: Sunset Sound, Hollywood, CA
- Genres: Punk rock, garage punk
- Length: 41:44
- Labels: Mom + Pop; Dine Alone
- Producer: Ricky Reed

Fidlar chronology
Too (2015)	Almost Free (2019)	Surviving the Dream (2024)

Singles from Almost Free
- 1. "Alcohol" Released: April 20, 2018; 2. "Too Real" Released: September 14, 2018; 3. "Can't You See" Released: October 12, 2018; 4. "By Myself" Released: January 9, 2019; 5. "Flake" Released: April 12, 2019

Almost Free is the third studio album by American skate punk band Fidlar, released on January 25, 2019. The album was recorded at Sunset Sound Studios in Hollywood, and produced by Ricky Reed.

== Background ==
On recording the album, frontman Zac Carper said in an interview with Kerrang!'s Chris Krovatin that:

it took us a while to make this record. Each song was meticulously thought about. It was a bouncing back and forth between us and a producer over the course of a year and a half. Some of the songs, we had a beat and decided to add a bunch of shit to it, and that was the vibe. But there were moments that I never thought would’ve sounded how they do on the record. It's just such a weird record for us, as a whole.

Speaking to Kat Corbett on KROQ Radio during an October 2018 interview, guitarist Elvis Kuehn and drummer Max Kuehn stated that Jane's Addiction drummer Stephen Perkins plays drums on a track on the album.

In a September 2018 interview with Upset Magazine, on the upcoming record and its sound, Carper said "it's our most diverse record, 100%, more so than Too, more so than our first record [...] We have horns on this record, fucking trumpets and saxophones and trombones and shit; we went for it. We just completely fucking went for it, so I'm excited for it to come out."

Speaking of the album in general, Kuehn stated in a press release that "Almost Free feels like a step forward for us in a lot of ways. We tried to be true to ourselves and let the music come out naturally, without fear of how people would receive it."

Elvis Kuehn, in a mid-December 2018 interview with Flood Magazine, said about the album title: "It was sort of about music being devalued. People don't really buy music as much nowadays. It just kept sticking with us when we thought about other options, because it has so many other meanings too."

== Critical reception ==
Professional ratings
Aggregate scores
Source	Rating
AnyDecentMusic?	5.8/10
Metacritic	74/100
Review scores
Source	Rating
Dork	4/5 stars
Gigwise	9/10 stars
Kerrang!	5/5 stars
NARC Magazine	4.5/5 stars
NME	4/5 stars
Uncut	6/10 stars
Under the Radar	3/10 stars

Kerrang!'s David McLaughlin gave the album a positive review of 5 out of 5, stating that the mixed variety of sounds, and themes on the record are "All of which makes Almost Free an absolute joy to behold. It’s a trip to listen to, and an instant modern classic."

Hannah Mylrea, writing for NME, gave a 4/5 star review to the album, comments that this album is a bold new choice for music fans and brings fresh influences.

Similarly, Charlie Sinclair for Gigwise also gave the album a positive review of 9/10, and stated that "lyrically Carper is at his best, exploring his sobriety in terms of both his own mental psyche and the direct effect it's having on those around him. Standout track 'Kick' serves as a bleak look at the life of an addict desperate to stay on the straight and narrow."

Timothy Michalik of Under the Radar, gave the album a negative review of 3/10, saying "Almost Free finds FIDLAR, the SoCal corporate-punks that at one point made endearing and charming pop-punk, ripping off Beastie Boys' worst tendencies and creative scapegoats" as well as stating that "Every move FIDLAR has made following their full-length debut, FIDLAR, sounds calculated, as if it was drafted up in a dingy, strip mall marketing office by a pair of washed-out hacks who no longer understand what is relevant."

== Track listing ==
No.	Title	Writer(s)	Length
1.	"Get Off My Rock"		3:18
2.	"Can't You See"	Fidlar; Ricky Reed	2:58
3.	"By Myself"	Fidlar; Reed	3:34
4.	"Flake"	Fidlar; Reed	3:47
5.	"Alcohol"	Fidlar	3:16
6.	"Almost Free" (instrumental)	Fidlar; Reed	2:15
7.	"Scam Likely"	Fidlar; Reed	3:04
8.	"Called You Twice" (featuring K.Flay)	Fidlar; Kristine Flaherty; Reed	4:23
9.	"Nuke"	Fidlar	0:38
10.	"Too Real"	Fidlar	4:05
11.	"Kick"	Fidlar	3:11
12.	"Thought. Mouth."	Fidlar	3:37
13.	"Good Times Are Over"	Fidlar; Reed	3:39
Total length:			41:44

== Personnel ==
Credits adapted from Almost Free liner notes.

Fidlar

- Zac Carper – vocals, guitar, "laptop", "raw data", OP1
- Elvis Kuehn – guitar, vocals, piano, dobro, "note bending"
- Brandon Schwartzel – bass guitar, "ballistic missile alarm", "church harmonies"
- Max Kuehn – drums, percussion, "Tom Shaman"

Production

- Neal Avron – mixer ("Alcohol" only)
- Zac Carper – producer ("Get Off My Rock", "Nuke" & "Too Real" only)
- Sam Eaton – producer ("Nuke" only)
- Chris Gehringer – mastering
- Bill Malina – engineer (except "Nuke")
- Manny Marroquin – mixer (except "Alcohol", "Almost Free", "Nuke", "Kick" & "Thought. Mouth.")
- Ricky Reed – producer (except "Nuke"), mixer ("Almost Free", "Nuke", "Kick" & "Thought. Mouth." only)
- Ethan Shumaker – engineer (except "Alcohol")
- Jerry Ordonez – engineer ("Alcohol" only)

== Charts ==
Weekly charts

Chart (2019)	Peak position
Australian Album Charts (ARIA)	57
US Alternative Album Sales (Billboard)	11
US Internet Albums (Billboard)	24
US Rock Album Sales (Billboard)	18
US Top Current Albums (Billboard)	44

Singles

Year	Song	Chart	Peak position
2019	"Can't You See"	Canada Rock Chart (Billboard)	48
