= Where Is the Circus =

Studio album by Hank Thompson
- Released: 1966
- Genre: Country
- Label: Warner Bros.
- Producer: Joe Allison

Hank Thompson chronology
| Breakin' the Rules (1966) | Where Is the Circus (1966) | The Best of Hank Thompson, Volume 2 (1967) |

Singles from Where Is The Circus
- 1. "Squaws Along the Yukon" Released: July 13, 1958

Where Is the Circus (And Other Heart Breakin' Hits) is an album by country music artist Hank Thompson and His Brazos Valley Boys. It was released in 1966 by Warner Bros. (catalog no. W1664). Joe Allison was the producer.

The album debuted on Billboard magazine's Top Country Albums chart on November 19, 1966, peaked at No. 6, and remained on the chart for a total of 22 weeks.

AllMusic gave the album a rating of two stars.

== Track listing ==
Side A

1. "Where Is the Circus"
2. "I'll Set My Teardrops to Music"
3. "Number One on the Hurt Parade"
4. "I've Got a Date with a Teardrop"
5. "The Big One Got Away"
6. "Love Walked Out Long Before She Did"

Side B

1. "Green Light"
2. "Most of All"
3. "New Blackboard of My Heart"
4. "Breaking the Rules"
5. "Humpty Dumpty Heart"
6. "Squaws Along the Yukon"
