= Houston (album) =

Studio album by Dean Martin
- Released: 1965
- Recorded: 1965
- Genres: Traditional pop, country
- Length: 29:28
- Label: Reprise
- Producer: Jimmy Bowen

Dean Martin chronology
(Remember Me) I'm the One Who Loves You (1965)	Houston (1965)	Somewhere There's a Someone (1966)

Houston is the seventeenth studio album by Dean Martin, produced by Jimmy Bowen.

Houston peaked at 11 on the Billboard 200. The title track, written by Lee Hazlewood, had appeared in the Top 40 in the summer of 1965.

The album was reissued on CD by Hip-O Records in 2009.

== Reception ==
Professional ratings
Review scores
Source	Rating
Allmusic	3/5 stars
Record Mirror	4/5 stars

William Ruhlmann, on Allmusic.com, gave the album three stars out of five, commenting that in the choice of songs and arrangements on the album, producer Jimmy Bowen was "...shrewdly expanding Martin's contemporary base beyond the formula records he had made in the wake of "Everybody Loves Somebody," and doing it successfully." Ruhlmann said that the chart performance of Houston showed that Martin's comeback "...was being sustained, not diminishing", albeit helped by promotion on Martin's successful new television show.

== Track listing ==
No.	Title	Writer(s)	Length
1.	"Houston"	Lee Hazlewood	2:43
2.	"The First Thing Ev'ry Morning (And the Last Thing Ev'ry Night)"	Jimmy Dean, Ruth Ann Roberts	2:12
3.	"Hammer and Nails"	Dick Glasser	2:26
4.	"Little Lovely One"	Tommy Boyce, Bobby Hart	2:08
5.	"Love, Love, Love"	Sunny David, Teddy McRae, Sidney Wyche	2:40
6.	"Down Home"	Roy Clark	2:52
7.	"I Will"	Dick Glasser	2:24
8.	"Snap Your Fingers"	Grady Martin, Alex Zanetis	2:26
9.	"Everybody But Me"	Dave Burgess	2:14
10.	"Old Yellow Line"	Jimmy Bowen	2:21
11.	"Detour"	Paul Westmoreland	2:45
12.	"You're the Reason I'm in Love"	Jack Morrow	2:14

== Personnel ==
- Dean Martin – vocals
- Bill Justis – arranger, conductor
- Ed Thrasher – art direction, photography
- Artis Page – cover art
- Eddie Brackett – engineer
- Stan Cornyn – liner notes
- Jimmy Bowen – producer
- Hal Blaine - drums
