= The Cry of the Heart =

Studio album by Connie Smith
- Released: August 20, 2021
- Studio: The Rukkus Room
- Genres: Country; traditional country
- Length: 31:00
- Label: Fat Possum
- Producers: Harry Stinson; Marty Stuart

Connie Smith chronology
Long Line of Heartaches (2011)	The Cry of the Heart (2021)	Love, Prison, Wisdom and Heartaches (2024)

Singles from The Cry of the Heart
- 1. "Look Out Heart" Released: May 12, 2021; 2. "Here Comes My Baby Back Again" Released: June 24, 2021

The Cry of the Heart is the thirty-sixth solo studio album by American country music singer Connie Smith. It was released on August 20, 2021, via Fat Possum Records. It is Smith's third album to be produced by her husband, Marty Stuart. The album is also Smith's first studio album in a decade. It comprises a total of 11 tracks, three of which were penned by Smith and Stuart. the album features recordings penned by Merle Haggard, Melba Montgomery and Carl Jackson. Three tracks are covers of songs previously released as singles by country artists. The album received positive reception from critics and journalists following its release.

== Background ==
Connie Smith had not recorded a new album in over a decade and had made her private life a priority above professional endeavors. Stuart's busy touring schedule also accounted for delays in planning a new album project. Husband (and singer-songwriter) Marty Stuart encouraged Smith to return to the studio following a new tune written by songwriter Dallas Frazier. Smith has recorded 72 songs by Frazier and his new song made her realize it was time to return to the studio. A live performance of Smith singing "A Million and One" on Stuart's televised country music show also prompted to pair to return to the studio and record an album based on it. The album was finished prior to the COVID-19 pandemic, but Smith chose to wait to release it until things began to "settle down".

== Recording and content ==
The Cry of the Heart was chosen to be focused on Smith's traditional country music style. The New York Times described the album as having "tender piano chords, steel guitars and lush analog quality recall Smith’s ’60s era recordings". Pop Matters found the album to also have elements of Countrypolitan, Honky tonk and pop. The album was recorded at The Rukkus Room, a studio located in Nashville, Tennessee. The sessions were produced by Stuart, and co-produced Harry Stinson. The session musicians included Nashville pianist Hargus "Pig" Robbins. Robbins had previously recorded on Smith's earliest studio sessions. The album also included Nashville musicians Paul Martin and Justin Weaver.

The disc contains a total of 11 songs. Smith and Stuart composed both "Spare Me No Truth Tonight" and "Here Comes My Baby Back Again" for the project. The couple penned both songs on a bus ride returning from a trip. "We worked awhile on ‘Here Comes My Baby’, longer than usual. Finally, I said, ‘We better finish this up before the driver kicks us off this bus," Smith recounted. She also collaborated with songwriter Monty Holmes on the track "Three Sides". Holmes had previously written popular songs recorded by several country artists including George Strait. Stuart and Harry Stinson also penned "Look Out Heart" for the album. "To Pieces" was composed by Carl Jackson, who played the song for Smith and Stuart. According to Smith, "he played [the song] for us when we were listening to his songs, and we cut that one." "I Just Don't Believe Me Anymore" was the new track written by Dallas Frazier that promoted the album's making. "It’s one of those hillbilly songs I love, I told Marty, ‘I have to record this'," she told The New York Times.

Three songs on the project are covers that were first released as singles by country performers. "A Million and One" was first made commercially successful by Billy Walker while "All the Time" was made a country hit twice. It was first made a top 20 country single by Kitty Wells and later a number one country song by Jack Greene. "Heart, We Did All That We Could" was first released as a single by Jean Shepard that reached the top 20 of the Billboard country chart. Smith also covered "Jesus Take a Hold", which was originally composed and recorded by Merle Haggard. The gospel song about "the state of the world" was cut by Haggard for his studio album Hag. Smith had first recorded the song for her 1971 studio album Where Is My Castle. She chose to re-record it because "it’s just as relevant today as it was back then, if not more so".

== Critical reception ==
Professional ratings
Review scores
Source	Rating
AllMusic	4/5 stars
PopMatters	8/10

The Cry of the Heart received positive reviews from music critics and journalists. The British-based Lyric Magazine praised the album's classic country style and found songs like "A Million and One" to cement "her mantle as the ‘Queen of Broken Hearts'." The magazine concluded its review by comparing it to that of modern country music: "Her vocals, her delivery and her belief in these songs is what makes ‘The Cry of the Heart’ a special album and one that deserves to be listened with care and attention, something a lot of Country music fans find difficult in these days of streaming overload and TikTok demands."

Justin Cober-Lake of PopMatters praised Smith's voice and found it to be "sharp" despite her age. Cober-Lake also found the album to evoke classic country music, but did not see it as a nostalgia record: "They avoid nostalgic traps without rejecting the past. If you wanted to understand what traditional country is, you could go to the same place today as you could have 50 years ago: a Connie Smith record."

No Depression's Jon Young found that Smith's voice has deepened but praised her phrasing. "If her voice is inevitably deeper and a tad rougher today, her phrasing remains impeccable. In other circumstances, she would have been a masterful jazz or pop artist." Young also appreciated the album for its classic country elements, calling it "a rich sense of history". He concluded the review by noting Smith as a timeless performer: "Though fashions change, great songs — and great singers — never really go out of style. On The Cry of the Heart, Connie Smith proves that once again." Jim Hynes of Country Standard Time highlighted its traditional style but also hinted that the album had a relevance to modern day: "While all that precedes it could be considered "classic country" of any year, Smith reminds us that she is still very much here and now. For that, we say 'Amen'."

Stephen Thomas Erlewine of AllMusic placed The Cry of the Heart on his "Best of 2021" albums list and rated it four stars. Erlewine praised her delivery and her no thrills approach for recording. "There's not a bad tune in the batch and, better still, Smith sounds vigorous and vibrant. Maybe her range has diminished, but her mastery of phrasing has not -- she digs into the heart of the songs, infusing them with style and emotion that resonates," he concluded.

== Release ==
The Cry of the Heart was announced as Smith's next studio release in May 2021. With its announcement came the release of a single, which was "Look Out Heart". In July 2021, "Here Comes My Baby Back Again" was released as a single off the album. On August 20, 2021, The Cry of the Heart was officially released on Fat Possum Records. The disc marked Smith's first in ten years since 2011's Long Line of Heartaches. The album was released to digital and streaming sites. It was also offered as a compact disc and as a vinyl LP. Following its release, The Cry of the Heart peaked at number 92 on the Billboard Current Album Sales chart. It was Smith's first charting album since 1976.

== Track listing ==
The Cry of the Heart
No.	Title	Writer(s)	Length
1.	"A Million and One"	Yvonne DeVaney	2:38
2.	"Look Out Heart"	Harry Stinson; Marty Stuart	2:17
3.	"Spare Me No Truth Tonight"	Connie Smith; Stuart	3:05
4.	"To Pieces"	Carl Jackson	2:52
5.	"All the Time"	Mel Tillis; Wayne P. Walker	2:42
6.	"I Just Don't Believe Me Anymore"	Glenn Ashworth; Dallas Frazier	2:37
7.	"Three Sides"	Monty Holmes; Smith	3:03
8.	"I'm Not Over You"	Jackson; Melba Montgomery	2:48
9.	"Here Comes My Baby Back Again"	Smith; Stuart	3:39
10.	"Heart, We Did All That We Could"	Ned Miller	2:34
11.	"Jesus, Take a Hold"	Merle Haggard	2:45
Total length:			31:00

== Personnel ==
All credits are adapted from the liner notes of The Cry of the Heart and AllMusic.

Musical personnel

- David Angell – Violin
- Sam Bacco – Timpani
- Gary Carter – Steel guitar
- Chad Cromwell – Drums
- David Davidson – Violin
- Christian Davis – Background vocals
- Sonya Isaacs – Background vocals
- Paul Martin – Background vocals, guitar, upright bass
- James Mitchell – Guitar
- Sari Reist – Cello
- Hargus "Pig" Robbins – Piano
- Chris Scruggs – Electric bass, guitar, upright bass
- Connie Smith – Lead vocals
- Harry Stinson – Background vocals
- Marty Stuart – Acoustic guitar, background vocals, electric guitar, Hi-string guitar, Nylon-string guitar, Sitar
- Kenny Vaughan – Electric guitar
- Justin Weaver – Rhythm guitar
- Kritsin Wilkinson – Viola
- Terry Wilson – Background vocals

Technical personnel

- Jamie Tate – Retro Recording Concept Designer, Engineer, Mixing, Mastering
- Dusty Cantrell – Project coordinator, videography
- Karen Cronin – Project design
- David Fricke – Liner notes
- Kris Wilkinson – String arrangements
- Cody Peavy – Videography
- Harry Stinson – Producer
- Marty Stuart – Producer, videography

== Charts ==
Chart (2021)	Peak position
UK Americana Albums (Official Charts)	20
US Current Album Sales (Billboard)	92

== Release history ==
Region	Date	Format	Label	Ref.
United States	August 20, 2021	Compact disc; music download; vinyl	Fat Possum Records	
