= Smoky the Bar =

Studio album by Hank Thompson
- Released: 1969
- Genre: Country
- Label: Dot
- Producer: Joe Allison

Hank Thompson chronology
On Tap, in the Can, or in the Bottle (1968)	Smoky the Bar (1969)	Hank Thompson Salutes Oklahoma (1970)

Smoky the Bar is an album by country music artist Hank Thompson and the Brazos Valley Boys. It was released in 1969 by Dot Records (catalog no. DLP-25932). Joe Allison was the producer. It is an album of songs related to drinking, partying, and bars.

AllMusic gave the album a rating of four-and-a-half stars. Reviewer Thom Jurek concluded: "This is one of Thompson's finest works from top to bottom and should be sought out by every fan of great 1960s country music."

The album debuted on Billboard magazine's Top Country Albums chart on May 17, 1969, peaked at No. 16, and remained on the chart for a total of 15 weeks.

== Track listing ==
Side A

1. "Smoky the Bar" (Joe Penix, Hank Thompson) [2:25]
2. "Ace in the Hole" (Hank Thompson, Merle Travis) [2:35]
3. "Let's Get Drunk and Be Somebody" (Hank Thompson) [2:26]
4. "New Records on the Jukebox" (Jet Penix, Hank Thompson) [2:40]
5. "My Rough and Rowdy Ways" (Elsie McWilliams, Jimmie Rodgers) [2:20]
6. "Cocaine Blues"

Side B

1. "I See Them Everywhere" (Hank Thompson) [2:04]
2. "Drunkard's Blues" (Hank Thompson) [3:46]
3. "What's Made Milwaukee Famous (Has Made a Loser Out of Me)" (Glenn Sutton) [2:09]
4. "Girl in the Night" (Hank Thompson) [3:05]
5. "Bright Lights and Blonde Haired Women" (Eddie Kirk) [2:37]
6. "Pop a Top" (Nat Stuckey) [2:20]
