= Hypochondriac (disambiguation) =

Hypochondriac may refer to:

- Hypochondriac (The Frights album), 2018
- Hypochondriac (Brakence album), 2022
- "Hypochondriac", a 2020 song by Fenne Lily
- Hypochondriac (film), a 1979 Italian comedy film

== Other uses ==
- Hypochondriasis, a condition in which a person is excessively and unduly worried about having a serious illness.
- Hypochondrium, an anatomical term referring to regions in the upper third of the abdomen
