= Songs for Rounders =

Studio album by Hank Thompson
- Released: 1959
- Genre: Country
- Label: Capitol
- Producer: Ken Nelson

Hank Thompson chronology
Favorite Waltzes (1959)	Songs for Rounders (1959)	Most of All (1960)

Songs for Rounders is an album by country music artist Hank Thompson and His Brazos Valley Boys. It was released in 1959 by Capitol Records (catalog no. T-1246). Ken Nelson was the producer. It was Thompson's first stereo album.

As noted in its liner notes, the album told stories of "tarnished heros ... rounders, bounders, fourflushers and bums ... rolling stones who go through life itching for trouble and finding it." The dark subject matter, including a song about cocaine, was controversial and ground-breaking in the country music world of the late 1950s.

The album was released prior to the establishment of the Billboard Top Country Albums chart in 1964.

AllMusic gave the album a rating of five stars. Reviewer Bruce Eder called it "maybe Thomposon's best LP."

== Track listing ==
Side A

1. "Three Times Seven" (Cliffie Stone, Merle Travis) [2:07]
2. "I'll Be a Bachelor Till I Die" (Hank Williams) [2:11]
3. "Drunkards' Blues" (Hank Thompson) [3:00]
4. "Teach 'Em How to Swim" (Jet Penix, Orville Proctor) [2:32]
5. "Dry Bread" (traditional) [2:38]
6. "Cocaine Blues" [3:02]

Side B

1. "Deep Elm" (Willard Robison) [2:28]
2. "Just Bummin' Around" (Peter Graves) [2:36]
3. "Little Blossom"
4. "Rovin' Gambler"
5. "Left My Gal in the Mountains"
6. "May I Sleep in Your Barn Tonight Mister?"
