= Willie's Roadhouse =

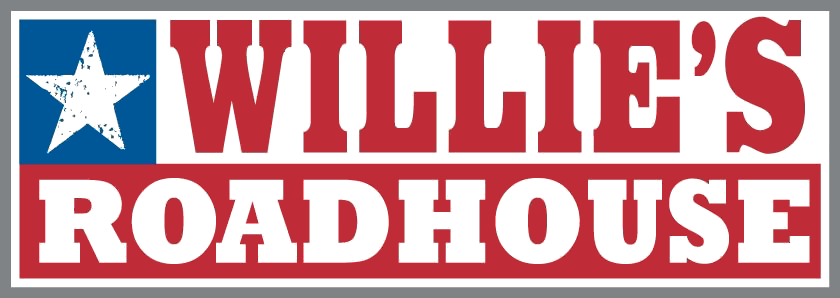
- Broadcast area: United States; Canada
- Frequencies: Sirius XM Radio 61; Dish Network 6061

Programming
- Format: Honky-Tonk Country

Ownership
- Owner: Sirius XM Radio; Willie Nelson

History
- First air date: 2001 as Hank's Place; July 10, 2006 as Willie's Place; May 4, 2011 as Willie's Roadhouse

Technical information
- Class: Satellite Radio Station

Links
- Website: Willie's Roadhouse

Willie's Roadhouse (formerly Willie's Place) is a channel on Sirius XM Radio that specializes in playing traditional country music and older country hit songs from the 1960s, 1970s, and 1980s. It is available on channel 61 (previously 59) and Dish Network 6061 (previously 6059), until No Shoes Radio took Willie's Roadhouse's former spot.

Until July 10, 2006, this channel was called "Hank's Place", named for Hank Williams. When this was announced, XM did not explain why the name was changed. Since then, however, Willie Nelson's face has appeared in print advertising for XM, meaning that he has signed an endorsement deal, like those earlier signed by Bob Dylan and Snoop Dogg, as well as many other celebrity figures in all walks of life (e.g. Oprah Winfrey and Dale Earnhardt Jr.).

It has since been announced that Nelson has taken over part ownership of the channel.

A program featuring cowboy poetry airs on Sunday nights.

On May 4, 2011, the channel was merged with The Roadhouse to make Willie's Roadhouse. As part of the merger, and in conjunction with the end of the Nashville! channel, the Grand Ole Opry moved its broadcasts to Willie's Roadhouse.

In 2018, it was announced that country artist Jeannie Seely would host a segment of the show on Sunday afternoons. "I’m so glad Jeannie Seely is on the Roadhouse. She is a good friend and will do a great job," commented Nelson. Following Seely's death in 2025, her time slot was given to Opry star Mandy Barnett to continue in her mentor's footsteps.

In February 2018, the channel attracted controversy in Canada by broadcasting the song "Squaws Along the Yukon" by Hank Thompson. The Canadian Broadcast Standards Council ruled that SiriusXM had breached Canadian broadcast standards by playing a song with discriminatory, degrading, and derogatory references to Indigenous women.

== Core artists ==
- Merle Haggard
- Kenny Rogers
- Willie Nelson
- George Jones
- Conway Twitty
- Johnny Cash
- Charley Pride
- Loretta Lynn
- Ronnie Milsap
- Dolly Parton
- Waylon Jennings
- Patsy Cline
- Tammy Wynette

== See also ==
- Willie's Place – A former truck stop named after Willie Nelson
