= On Tap, in the Can, or in the Bottle =

Studio album by Hank Thompson
- Released: 1968
- Genre: Country
- Label: Dot
- Producer: Joe Allison

Hank Thompson chronology
The Gold Standard Collection of Hank Thompson (1967)	On Tap, in the Can, or in the Bottle (1968)	Smoky the Bar (1969)

On Tap, in the Can, or in the Bottle is an album by country music artist Hank Thompson and the Brazos Valley Boys. It was released in 1968 by Dot Records (catalog no. DLP-25894). Joe Allison was the producer.

AllMusic gave the album a rating of five stars. Reviewer Thom Jurek called it "a masterpiece of writing, playing, sequencing, and overall honky tonk bravado ... one of the greatest country records of all time."

The album debuted on Billboard magazine's Top Country Albums chart on November 16, 1968, peaked at No. 42, and remained on the chart for a total of five weeks.

== Track listing ==
Side A

1. "On Tap, in the Can, or in the Bottle" (Hank Thompson) [2:23]
2. "He's Got a Way with Women" (Rodney Lay, Hank Thompson) [2:46]
3. "No. 1 on the Hurt Parade" (Hank Thompson) [2:20]
4. "Love Walked Out Before She Did" (Hank Thompson) [2:16]
5. "I'll Set My Teardrops to Music" (Hank Thompson) [2:37]
6. "The Big One Got Away" (Hank Thompson) [1:55]

Side B

1. "Where Is the Circus (Here Comes the Clown)" (Bob Bishop, Hank Thompson) [2:28]
2. "If I Love You Tomorrow" (Hank Thomposon) [2:55]
3. "I've Got a Date with a Teardrop" (Hank Thompson) [2:20]
4. "The Great Society" (Hank Thompson) [1:57]
5. "Let the Four Winds Choose" (Hank Thompson) [2:45]
6. "Lend Me a Dollar" (Hank Thompson) [2:08]
