= Seven Decades =

Studio album by Hank Thompson
- Released: July 18, 2000
- Genre: Country music
- Length: 36:32
- Label: HighTone Records
- Producer: Lloyd Maines

Hank Thompson chronology
Here's to Country Music (1988)	Seven Decades (2000)	Greatest Hits (2008)

Seven Decades is an album by Hank Thompson released on July 18, 2000. The album's name reflects the length of Thompson's career as a musician. It is the first album Thompson released on HighTone Records, and was produced by Lloyd Maines. Thompson described the music on the album as "just whatever I wanted to do" and said that each song had no intentional relationship to any of the others on the album. The songs on Seven Decades are a mix of new originals, such as "Condo in Hondo," "Medicine Man" and "New Wine in Old Bottles," and old standards such as "Wreck of the Old 97". Thompson said after the album's release that he felt better about it than anything he had done since "back in the old Capitol days." Seven Decades proved to be Thompson's final album before his death in 2007.

== Critical reception ==
Professional ratings
Review scores
Source	Rating
AllMusic	4/5 stars
The Austin Chronicle	3/5 stars
Calgary Herald	3/4
The Indianapolis Star	4/4 stars
Montreal Gazette	4/5
Sarasota Herald-Tribune	B–
Windsor Star	5/5 stars

Critical reception to Seven Decades was mixed. One of the more favorable reviews was written by The Indianapolis Star's Jim Johnson, who gave the album four out of four stars. Johnson wrote, "Singing like a man half his age, 74-year-old Hank Thompson swings ferociously on Seven Decades...Especially noteworthy are the strong Travis-style leads of guitarist Thom Bresh and the twin fiddle attack of George Uptmor and Billy McBay." A much less favorable review was written by Zac Crain, who wrote in the Dallas Observer that "Thompson makes a good effort on Seven Decades, but unless you grade the disc on a curve, this is just an average country album, about as extraordinary as a new country record by someone named Chad."

== Track listing ==
All songs composed by Hank Thompson, except where noted.

1. Sting in This Ole Bee
2. In the Jailhouse Now (Jimmie Rodgers)
3. Condo in Hondo
4. Triflin' Gal (Cindy Walker)
5. Dinner for One, Please, James (Nat King Cole)
6. The Night Miss Nancy Ann's Hotel for Single Girls Burned Down (Tex Williams)
7. I'll Start Believing in You
8. Abdul Abulbul Amir
9. Lobo the Hobo
10. New Wine in Old Bottles
11. Medicine Man
12. Scotch and Soda (Dave Guard)
13. Wreck of the Old 97 (G. B. Grayson and Henry Whitter)

== Personnel ==
- Thom Bresh - Guitar
- Lori Eanes - Photography
- Ronny Ellis - Bass (Upright)
- Gene Glover - Drums
- Terri Hendrix - Background Vocals
- Gary Hogue - Steel Guitar, Pedal Steel
- Mark Jordan - Keyboards
- Eduardo López - Accordion
- Lloyd Maines - Producer
- Cindy Pascarello - Design
- Kent Stump - Engineer
