= Hargus "Pig" Robbins =

American session keyboard player (1938–2022)

- Also known as: Mel Robbins
- Born: Hargus Melvin Robbins; January 18, 1938; Spring City, Tennessee, U.S.
- Died: January 30, 2022 (aged 84)
- Genres: Country
- Occupation: Session musician
- Instrument: Keyboards
- Years active: 1957–2022
- Labels: Time, Chart, Elektra
- Formerly of: The Nashville A-Team

Hargus Melvin Robbins (January 18, 1938 – January 30, 2022), known by his nickname "Pig", was an American keyboard player. He played on records for many artists as a prolific session musician, mostly in the country music style but occasionally other genres.

== Life and career ==
Robbins was born on January 18, 1938, in Spring City, Tennessee. When he was three years old, he accidentally poked himself in the eye with a knife so seriously the eye was medically removed. He later lost sight in his other eye as well, rendering him blind.

He learned to play piano at age seven, while attending the Tennessee School for the Blind in Nashville. During his time there, Robbins was given the nickname "Pig" by a school supervisor due to his propensity to "sneak in through a fire escape and play when [he] wasn’t supposed to and … get dirty as a pig."

He played his first session in 1957, with his first major recording being George Jones's "White Lightning". Thereafter, he played keyboard for scores of country music artists. Some of his prominent recording sessions were with Travis Tritt, Patsy Cline, Dolly Parton, Connie Smith, Patti Page, Loretta Lynn, The Everly Brothers, Kenny Rogers, George Jones, Charlie Rich, Bob Dylan, Neil Young, J.J. Cale, John Hartford, John Stewart, Mark Knopfler, Alan Jackson, Merle Haggard, Roger Miller, Gary Stewart, David Allan Coe, Moe Bandy, George Hamilton IV, Sturgill Simpson, Conway Twitty, Ween, and Al Hirt.

Between 1963 and 1979, Robbins recorded eight studio albums as a solo artist or bandleader: one on Time Records, three on Chart Records, and four on Elektra Records, as well as an independently released live album. He was awarded Musician of the Year by the Country Music Association in 1976 and 2000.

His 1959 single "Save It", recorded under the name Mel Robbins, was covered by The Cramps on their 1983 album Off the Bone.

Robbins joined producers Alan Autry and Randall Franks on In the Heat of the Night's 1991 Christmas Time's A Comin' CD, appearing on several cuts and receiving feature credit on David Hart's recording of "Let it Snow".

Robbins was inducted into the Musicians Hall of Fame and Museum in 2007 and on October 21, 2012, Robbins was inducted into the Country Music Hall of Fame.

In Robert Altman's classic, Nashville, a hippie piano player nicknamed "Frog" is fired by Henry Gibson's character (an egotistical country singer), who yells at the studio engineer: "When I ask for Pig, I want Pig!"

Robbins died on January 30, 2022, at the age of 84.

== Discography ==
=== Albums ===
Year	Album	US Country
1962	Hully Gully to The Hits as Mel "Pigue" Robbins	—
1963	A Bit of Country Piano	—
1968	Play It Again, Hargus	—
1969	Hargus Robbins	—
1969	One More Time	—
1977	Country Instrumentalist of the Year	46
1978	A Pig in a Poke	—
1979	Alive from Austin City Limits	—
1979	Unbreakable Hearts	—

=== Singles ===
Year	Song	US Country
1979	"Chunky People"	83
1979	"Unbreakable Hearts"	92

== Collaborations ==
- Blonde on Blonde - Bob Dylan (1966)
- Just Because I'm a Woman - Dolly Parton (1968)
- Any Day Now - Joan Baez (1968)
- David's Album - Joan Baez (1969)
- Summer Side of Life - Gordon Lightfoot (1971)
- Coat of Many Colors - Dolly Parton (1971)
- My Tennessee Mountain Home - Dolly Parton (1973)
- Hank Wilson's Back Vol. I - Leon Russell (1973)
- Okie - J. J. Cale (1974)
- Jolene - Dolly Parton (1974)
- Lovin' and Learnin' - Tanya Tucker (1976)
- Look My Way - Rosemary Clooney (1976)
- Love Lifted Me - Kenny Rogers (1976)
- Kenny Rogers - Kenny Rogers (1977)
- Daytime Friends - Kenny Rogers (1977)
- Love or Something Like It - Kenny Rogers (1978)
- The Gambler - Kenny Rogers (1978)
- Kenny - Kenny Rogers (1979)
- American Son - Levon Helm (1980)
- Dreamlovers - Tanya Tucker (1980)
- Some Days Are Diamonds - John Denver (1981)
- Both Sides of Love - Paul Anka (1981)
- Old Ways - Neil Young (1985)
- Shadowland - k.d. lang (1988)
- Pocket Full of Gold - Vince Gill (1991)
- Back Home Again - Kenny Rogers (1991)
- In My Wildest Dreams - Kenny Chesney (1994)
- The Tattooed Heart - Aaron Neville (1995)
- The Woman in Me - Shania Twain (1995)
- Treasures - Dolly Parton (1996)
- Golden Heart - Mark Knopfler (1996)
- 12 Golden Country Greats - Ween (1996)
- The Key - Vince Gill (1998)
- Backwoods Barbie - Dolly Parton (2008)
- Better Day - Dolly Parton (2011)
- High Top Mountain - Sturgill Simpson (2013)
- The Weight of These Wings - Miranda Lambert (2016)
- The Cry of the Heart - Connie Smith (2021)
- Love, Prison, Wisdom and Heartaches - Connie Smith (2024)

== See also ==
- The Nashville A-Team
