= Dance Ranch =

Studio album by Hank Thompson
- Released: 1958
- Genre: Country
- Label: Capitol

Hank Thompson chronology
Hank! (1957)	Dance Ranch (1958)	Favorite Waltzes (1959)

Dance Ranch is a studio album by country music artist Hank Thompson and His Brazos Valley Boys. It was released in 1958 by Capitol Records (catalog no. T-875).

In the annual poll of country music disc jockeys by Billboard magazine, Dance Ranch ranked as the No. 10 album of 1958.

AllMusic gave the album a rating of five stars. Reviewer Bruce Eder called it "one of the group's best albums."

== Track listing ==
Side A

1. "Beaumont Rag"
2. "Headin' Down the Wrong Highway"
3. "After All the Things I've Done"
4. "Woodchopper's Ball"
5. "Drivin' Nails in My Coffin"
6. "Klishama Klingo"

Side B

1. "Bartenders' Polka"
2. "Bubbles in My Beer"
3. "Make Room in Your Heart (For a Memory)"
4. "Summit Ridge Drive"
5. "I Wouldn't Miss It for the World"
6. "Lawdy, What a Gal"
