= Most of All (Hank Thompson album) =

Studio album by Hank Thompson
- Released: 1960
- Genre: Country
- Label: Capitol
- Producer: Ken Nelson

Hank Thompson chronology
Song for Rounders (1959)	Most of All (1960)	This Broken Heart of Mine (1960)

Most of All is a studio album by country music artist Hank Thompson and His Brazos Valley Boys. It was released in 1960 by Capitol Records (catalog no. T-1360). Ken Nelson was the producer.

In the annual poll by Billboard magazine of country music disc jockeys, Most of All ranked as the No. 7 album of 1960.

AllMusic gave the album a rating of two-and-a-half stars.

== Track listing ==
Side A

1. "Most of All"
2. "The Blackboard of My Heart"
3. "Tears Are Only Rain"
4. "Wake Up Irene"
5. "Breakin' the Rules"
6. "Squaws Along the Yukon"

Side B

1. "Green Light"
2. "We've Gone Too Far"
3. "I Was the First One"
4. "A Girl in the Night"
5. "Waiting in the Lobby of Your Heart"
6. "Rockin' in the Congo"
