= Come Running Back =

Single by Dean Martin

from the album The Hit Sound of Dean Martin
- B-side: "Bouquet of Roses"
- Released: 1966
- Genre: Pop
- Length: 2:05
- Label: Reprise
- Songwriter: Dick Glasser
- Producer: Jimmy Bowen

Dean Martin singles chronology
"Somewhere There's a Someone" (1966)	"Come Running Back" (1966)	"Bouquet of Roses" (1966)

"Come Running Back" is a song written by Dick Glasser, which was released in 1966 by Dean Martin. The song spent 7 weeks on the Billboard Hot 100 chart, peaking at No. 35, while reaching No. 4 on Billboard's Easy Listening chart. In Canada, the song reached No. 74 on the RPM 100 and No. 16 on the CHUM Hit Parade.

The song was ranked No. 35 on Billboard's ranking of "Top Easy Listening Singles" of 1966.

== Chart performance ==
Chart (1966)	Peak position
US Billboard Hot 100	35
US Billboard Easy Listening	4
Canada - RPM 100	74
Canada - CHUM Hit Parade	16
