= Songs of the Brazos Valley =

Studio album by Hank Thompson
- Released: 1956
- Genre: Country
- Label: Capitol

Hank Thompson chronology
Songs of the Brazos Valley (1956)	North of the Rio Grande (1955)

Singles from Songs of the Brazos Valley
- 1. "The Wild Side of Life" Released: January 12, 1952; 2. "Rub-A-Dub-Dub" Released: April 7, 1953

Songs of the Brazos Valley is a studio album by country music artist Hank Thompson and his Brazos Valley Boys. It was released in 1956 by Capitol Records (catalog no. T-418). It was Thompson's first album.

AllMusic gave the album a rating of four stars. Reviewer Bruce Eder called it "an entertaining combination of fast-paced novelty tunes ..., slow romantic ballads ..., covers ..., and surprisingly brisk adaptations of traditional material".

== Track listing ==
Side A

1. "The Wild Side of Life"
2. "Rub-A-Dub-Dub"
3. "Yesterday's Girl"
4. " When You're Lovin', You're Livin'"
5. "John Henry"
6. "I Saw My Mother's Name"

Side B

1. "The New Green Light"
2. "Simple Simon"
3. "The Letter Edged in Black"
4. "Mother, Queen of My Heart"
5. "You Don't Have the Nerve"
6. "At the Rainbow's End"
