= Hank! =

Studio album by Hank Thompson
- Released: 1957
- Genre: Country
- Label: Capitol

Hank Thompson chronology
New Recordings of Hank Thompson's All-Time Hits (1956)	Hank! (1957)	Dance Ranch (1958)

Hank! is a studio album by country music artist Hank Thompson and His Brazos Valley Boys. It was released in 1957 by Capitol Records (catalog no. T-826).

In the annual poll by Billboard magazine of country music disc jockeys, Hank! ranked as the No. 3 album of 1957. The album's popularity extended into 1958, and it still ranked No. 7 in the 1958 poll.

AllMusic gave the album a rating of four stars. Reviewer Bruce Eder wrote: "The band was nearing its peak from this point in its history."

== Track listing ==
Side A

1. "Hang Your Head in Shame"
2. "String of Pearls"
3. "The Gypsy"
4. "You'll Be the One"
5. "Don't Be That Way"
6. "Ole Napoleon"

Side B

1. "I Don't Want to Know"
2. "Prosperity Special"
3. "Someone Can Steal You from Me"
4. "Don't Look Now"
5. "Across the Valley from the Alamo"
6. "Don't Get Around Much Anymore"
