= The Frights =

American surf punk band

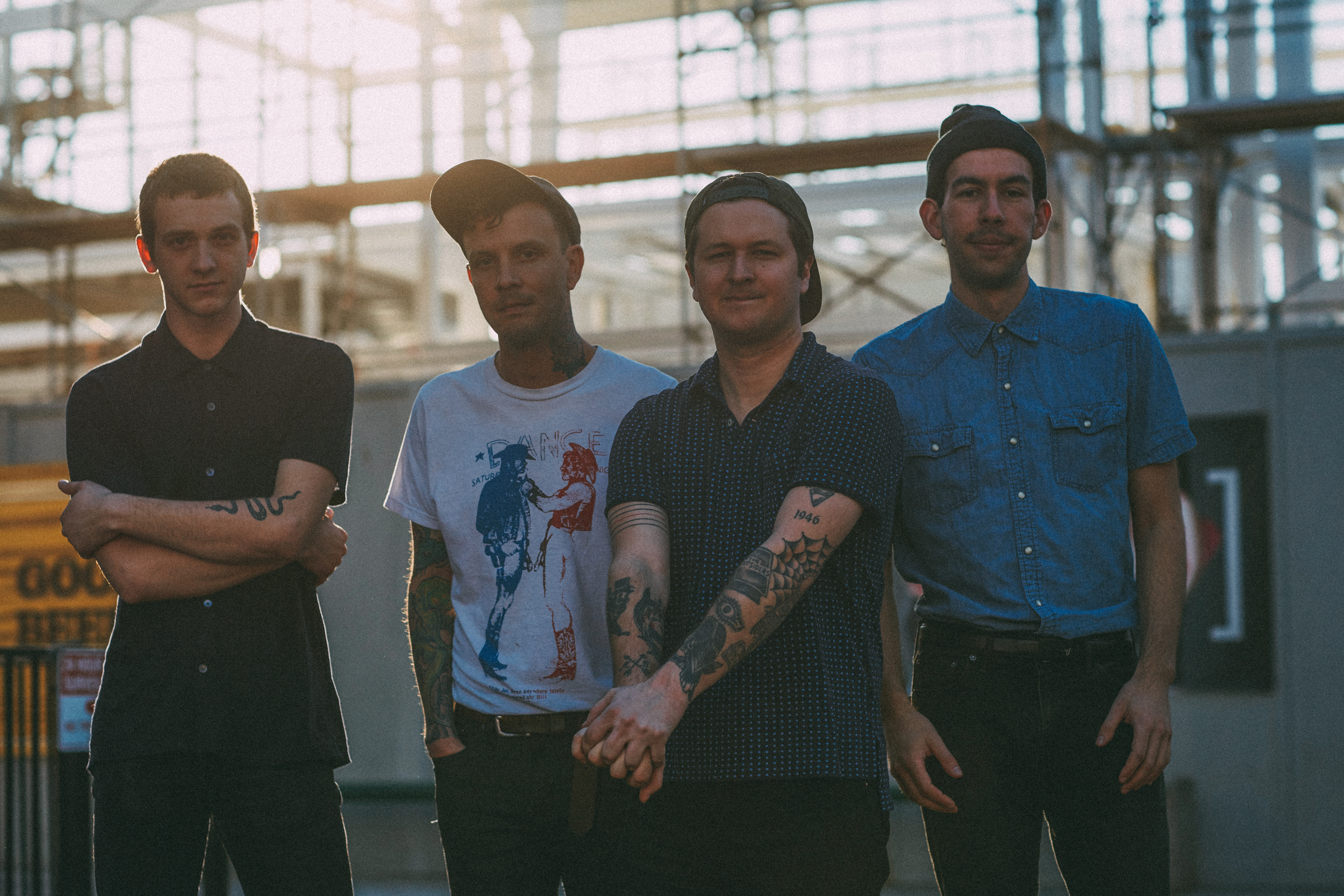
- The Frights in 2018 (left to right): Richard Dotson, Jordan Clark, Mikey Carnevale and Marc Finn.

Background information
- Also known as: Black Hootie (2012)
- Origin: Poway, California, United States
- Genres: Garage punk; surf punk; punk rock; indie rock; doo-wop
- Years active: 2012–present
- Labels: Postmark; Dangerbird; Epitaph
- Members: Mikey Carnevale; Richard Dotson; Marc Finn; Jordan Clark
- Past members: Adam Lomnitzer
- Website: thefrights.com

The Frights are an American surf punk band formed in Poway, California, in 2012. Since 2017, the band has consisted of Mikey Carnevale (lead vocals, rhythm guitar), Richard Dotson (bass guitar, backing vocals), Marc Finn (drums), and Jordan Clark (lead guitar, backing vocals).

== History ==
The Frights were formed in 2013 by lead vocalist/guitarist Mikey Carnevale, bassist Richard Dotson, and drummer Adam Lomnitzer as a simple time-killer project following the trio's graduation from high school. Their musical style mixed elements of surf, classic punk, and doo-wop, resulting in "tunes that managed to be catchy, aggressive, and playfully ridiculous all at once."

The band separated shortly after formation, with all three members attending college, but rejoined in December 2012 to play a one-off show during Christmas break. The intent was to disband once again after this show, but the band were approached by an audience member who offered to sign the band to local label Postmark Records.

The Frights released their first single "Hippie Lips" on the Postmark Records YouTube channel in February 2013. In March 2013, the Frights' debut EP Dead Beach was released by Postmark. This was followed by their second EP, Fur Sure, in May 2013, and their self-titled debut studio album on October 31, 2013.

In 2014, the band would continue to perform live as well as record and release new material starting with the single "Tongues / Puppy Knuckles" in April. On July 22, the Frights and Death Lens would release a split EP titled DeathFrights. This marked the band's final release with Postmark, as well as the exit of drummer Adam Lomnitzer who would be replaced by Marc Finn shortly after. Due to other commitments, Finn would not be able to gig consistently with the group until spring 2015, during which Ryan Ward would sit in on drums. Afterwards, Ward would continue to play with the band as a guitarist until his departure in September, 2016.

The Frights signed with independent label Dangerbird Records in 2015. Subsequently, they released their sophomore studio album You Are Going to Hate This, produced by FIDLAR frontman Zac Carper, on February 12, 2016.

In February of 2018, the Frights returned to the studio with Carper to record their third studio album Hypochondriac, this marked a shift in lyrical themes and musical style, with frontman Mikey Carnevale writing more personal songs about past relationships and mental health. The album was the band's first for Epitaph Records, as well as their first album to feature lead guitarist Jordan Clark. Hypochondriac was released August 24, 2018 to mixed critical reception.

On April 12, 2019, the Frights released Live at The Observatory, a live album which captured their September 8, 2018 show at The Observatory in Santa Ana, California.

Following the release of Live at The Observatory, on April 21, 2019, Mikey Carnevale and Richard Dotson began the recording of Carnevale's planned solo album, these sessions concluded on April 28 and the Frights would return to the road shortly after. Carnevale's songs would be performed live at a series of shows in San Diego and Los Angeles to positive response from the other band members, it was then decided that the album would be released as the Frights' next studio album. On January 24, 2020 Everything Seems Like Yesterday released via Epitaph Records.

On March 3, 2023, the Frights announced their fifth album, Gallows Humour, to be released on June 2.

== Personnel ==
Current members

- Mikey Carnevale – lead vocals, rhythm guitar, acoustic guitar (2012–present)
- Richard Dotson – bass guitar, backing vocals (2012–present); rhythm guitar (2020–present)
- Marc Finn – drums, percussion (2014–present)
- Jordan Clark – lead guitar, backing vocals (2016-present)

Former members

- Adam Lomnitzer – drums (2012–2014)

Former touring members

- Ryan Ward – drums (2014–2015); guitar, backing vocals (2015–2016)
- Elias Avila – keyboard/guitar/etc (2020–2024)

== Discography ==
=== Studio albums ===
- The Frights (2013)
- You Are Going to Hate This (2016)
- Hypochondriac (2018)
- Everything Seems Like Yesterday (2020)
- Gallows Humour (2023)
- Ready When You Are (2025)

=== EPs ===
- Dead Beach (2013)
- Fur Sure (2013)
- DeathFrights (2014) (split with Death Lens)

=== Live albums ===
- Live at the Observatory (2019)

=== Singles ===
- "Tongues" / "Puppy Knuckles" (2014)
- "Christmas Everyday" (2016)
- "Valentine's Sux" (2018)
- "CRUTCH" (2018)
- "Tiny Cities Made of Ashes" (2019)
- "Kicking Cans" (2020)
- "Leave Me Alone" (2020)
- "I'm a Beatle" (2023)
- "Boy" (2023)
