= Hank Thompson at the Golden Nugget =

Live album by Hank Thompson
- Released: October 1961
- Genre: Country
- Label: Capitol
- Producer: Ken Nelson

Hank Thompson chronology
An Old Love Affair (1961)	Hank Thompson at the Golden Nugget (1961)	The No. 1 Country & Western Band (1962)

Hank Thompson at the Golden Nugget is a live album by country music artist Hank Thompson and His Brazos Valley Boys. It was released in October 1961 by Capitol Records (catalog no. T-1632). Ken Nelson was the producer.

In the annual poll by Billboard magazine of country music disc jockeys, Hank Thompson at the Golden Nugget ranked as the No. 4 album of 1962.

AllMusic gave the album a rating of five stars. Reviewer Bruce Eder opined that it was "arguably Hank Thompson's best album, representing his amalgam of honky tonk and Western swing better than almost any other long player of its era."

== Track listing ==
Side A

1. "Honky Tonk Girl"
2. "I Guess I'm Getting Over You"
3. "I'll Step Aside"
4. "Orange Blossom"
5. "I Didn't Mean to Fall in Love"
6. "John Henry"

Side B

1. "Nine Pound Hammer"
2. "She's Just a Whole Lot Like You"
3. "Have I Told You Lately That I Love You"
4. "Steel Guitar Rag"
5. "Just One Step Away"
6. "Lost Highway"
7. "A Six Pack to Go"
