= Hypochondriac (The Frights album) =

Studio album by the Frights
- Released: August 24, 2018
- Recorded: February 1–13, 2018
- Studio: Balboa Recording, Los Angeles, CA
- Genre: Surf punk, indie rock
- Length: 38:50
- Label: Epitaph
- Producer: Zac Carper

The Frights studio chronology
You Are Going to Hate This (2016)	Hypochondriac (2018)	Everything Seems Like Yesterday (2020)

The Frights chronology
You Are Going to Hate This (2016)	Hypochondriac (2018)	Live at the Observatory (2019)

Singles from Hypochondriac
- 1. "Crutch" Released: May 14, 2018

Professional ratings
Review scores
Source	Rating
AllMusic	3.5/5 stars
Upset	3/5 stars

Hypochondriac is the third studio album by American surf-punk band the Frights, released August 24, 2018 on Epitaph Records.

== Background ==
Frontman Mikey Carnevale explains starting work on Hypochondriac in his own terms:

I had started to brainstorm where I wanted to go with this record basically the day we released You Are Going to Hate This. At first, I overthought the hell out of it, due to coming down from the high of making our first real album in a real studio with a real producer. So it took about a year or so until I realized that I’m not special and I just forced myself to sit down with an acoustic guitar. What came of that, I think, is a confessional album that I never assumed a band like ours would make.

The band entered Balboa Recording in Los Angeles in February 2018 with producer and Fidlar frontman Zac Carper, spending two straight weeks recording songs. Hypochondriac marked the debut of guitarist Jordan Clark and was the band's first release for Epitaph Records.

== Track listing ==
All tracks are written by Mikey Carnevale

No.	Title	Length
1.	"Tell Me Why I'm Okay"	3:17
2.	"Crutch"	2:44
3.	"Broken Brain"	3:13
4.	"Whatever"	3:42
5.	"Over It"	3:12
6.	"Me and We and I"	4:50
7.	"Goodbyes"	3:14
8.	"Pills"	2:49
9.	"No Place Like (Not Being) Home"	4:00
10.	"Hold Me Down"	4:15
11.	"Alone"	3:34
Total length:		38:50

Notes

- "Crutch" is stylized in all uppercase.
- Some sources credit Zac Carper as a co-writer. According to The Frights official Bandcamp page, Mikey Carnevale is the sole writer of the album.

== Personnel ==
The Frights

- Mikey Carnevale – lead vocals, guitar
- Jordan Clark – guitar
- Richard Dotson – bass guitar
- Marc Finn – drums

Production

- David Baker – mixing assistant
- Greg Calbi – mastering
- Zac Carper – producer
- Rowan Daly – photography
- David Jerkovich – engineer
- Rob Kinelski – mixing
- Jason Link and the Frights – layout and design

== Charts ==
Chart (2018)	Peak position
US Heatseekers Albums (Billboard)	10
US Independent Albums (Billboard)	34
