= Too (Fidlar album) =

Studio album by Fidlar
- Released: September 4, 2015
- Recorded: December 2014 at St. Charles Studio in East Nashville, TN
- Genres: Skate punk, garage rock, punk rock, garage punk
- Length: 39:31
- Labels: Mom + Pop; Wichita; Dine Alone
- Producer: Jay Joyce

Fidlar chronology
Fidlar (2013)	Too (2015)	Almost Free (2019)

Singles from Too
- 1. "40oz. On Repeat" Released: June 2, 2015; 2. "Drone" Released: August 13, 2015; 3. "Why Generation" Released: February 1, 2016

Too is the second studio album by American skate punk band Fidlar, released September 4, 2015.

== Singles ==
The album's lead single "40 oz. On Repeat" was released on June 2, 2015, along with an official video.

The album's second single "Drone" and its video were released exclusively on iTunes and Apple Music on August 13, 2015 before being released to all retail formats the next day. The song is featured in the soundtrack to the video game WWE 2K17.

"Why Generation" was promoted as the album's third single with the premiere of an animated music video composed of almost entirely emojis. The video was directed by Ryan Baxley and animated by Nolan Fabricius.

=== Promotional singles ===
"West Coast" was released on July 15, 2015 as the album's first promotional single, along with a music video featuring performance footage. An original demo of the song was previously included on the band's 2012 EP Shit We Recorded in Our Bedroom.

"Leave Me Alone" was released on August 27, 2015 as the album's second promotional single, accompanied by a lyric video.

== Critical reception ==
Professional ratings
Aggregate scores
Source	Rating
Metacritic	76/100
Review scores
Source	Rating
AllMusic	3/5 stars
The A.V. Club	B
Clash	7/10
Consequence of Sound	B+
DIY	5/5 stars
Drowned in Sound	6/10
Exclaim!	8/10
NME	8/10
Pitchfork	5.8/10
Spin	7/10

Upon release, Too received generally positive reviews from music critics. At Metacritic, which assigns a normalized rating out of 100 to reviews from mainstream critics, the album received a generally favorable score of 76 based on 20 reviews. Consequence Of Sound ranked it No. 46 on their top 50 albums of 2015.

== Track listing ==
All tracks are written by Zac Carper, except where noted.

No.	Title	Writer(s)	Length
1.	"40oz. on Repeat"		3:52
2.	"Punks"	Elvis Kuehn, Carper	2:42
3.	"West Coast"		3:22
4.	"Why Generation"	Kuehn	4:28
5.	"Sober"		2:26
6.	"Leave Me Alone"		3:20
7.	"Drone"	Kuehn	2:48
8.	"Overdose"		3:48
9.	"Hey Johnny"	Kuehn	3:27
10.	"Stupid Decisions"	Brandon Schwartzel, Carper	3:31
11.	"Bad Medicine"	Schwartzel	2:56
12.	"Bad Habits"		5:31

== Personnel ==
Fidlar

- Zac Carper – vocals, guitar
- Elvis Kuehn – guitar, vocals
- Brandon Schwartzel – bass guitar, vocals
- Max Kuehn – drums, percussion

Production

- Alice Baxley – photography
- Ryan Baxley – design
- Paul Cossette – assistant engineer
- Richard Dodd – mastering
- Jason Hall – recording
- Jay Joyce – producer, recording
- Melissa Spillman – production assistant
- Caleb VanBuskirk – studio assistant

== Charts ==
Chart (2015)	Peak position
Australian Albums (ARIA)	28
Belgian Albums (Ultratop Flanders)	175
UK Albums (Official Charts)	45
US Billboard 200	124
US Heatseekers Albums (Billboard)	1
