= Dean Martin Sings Songs from "The Silencers" =

Dean Martin Sings Songs from 'The Silencers'

Studio album by Dean Martin
- Released: March 1966
- Recorded: 1966
- Genre: Traditional pop
- Length: 30:06
- Label: Reprise - R/RS 6211
- Producer: Jimmy Bowen

Dean Martin chronology
Somewhere There's a Someone (1966)	Dean Martin Sings Songs from 'The Silencers' (1966)	The Hit Sound of Dean Martin (1966)

Dean Martin Sings Songs from "The Silencers" is the nineteenth studio album by Dean Martin of songs that featured in his film The Silencers, the first of the four films featuring the Matt Helm character that Martin would appear in. The album was arranged by Ernie Freeman and Gene Page.

Many of the Tin Pan Alley songs featured on this album appeared in the film, as songs imagined by Martin's character. The album also features a recording of incidental music not in the film and an instrumental of Elmer Bernstein's title song.

This was the second of five albums that Martin released in 1966. As well as starring in The Silencers that year he also starred in two other films; another Matt Helm film, Murderers' Row, and Texas Across the River, and appeared in his own television show. Dean Martin Sings Songs from "The Silencers" peaked at 108 on the Billboard 200. Dean Martin Sings Songs from "The Silencers" was the last soundtrack album that Martin recorded. The 1960s had also seen Martin appear on the soundtrack to Robin and the 7 Hoods, a 1964 film fellow Rat Pack members Frank Sinatra and Sammy Davis Jr., with Bing Crosby.

A soundtrack album featuring Elmer Bernstein's score without any artwork of Dean Martin was also released.

The Everly Brothers released a vocal version of Lovey Kravezit.

== Reception ==
Professional ratings
Review scores
Source	Rating
Allmusic	2.5/5 stars

William Ruhlmann on Allmusic.com gave the album two and a half stars out of five. Ruhlmann commented on the "bravura treatment" given to the songs by Ernie Freeman and Gene Page's arrangements, but added that as a film tie-in, the album "deservedly didn't attract much attention, although Martin's popularity assured it would spend several weeks in the charts."

== Track listing ==
1. "The Glory of Love" (Billy Hill) – 2:20
2. "Empty Saddles (in the Old Corral)" (Hill) – 2:22
3. "Lovey Kravezit" – 2:28 (Howard Greenfield and Jack Keller instrumental by Mike Leander)
4. "The Last Round-Up" (Hill) – 3:14
5. "Anniversary Song" (Saul Chaplin, Al Jolson) – 2:33 (instrumental)
6. "Side by Side" (Harry M. Woods) – 2:15
7. "South of the Border" (Michael Carr, Jimmy Kennedy) – 2:41
8. "Red Sails in the Sunset" (Kennedy, Hugh Williams) – 2:38
9. "Lord, You Made the Night Too Long" (Victor Young, Sam M. Lewis) – 2:34 (instrumental)
10. "If You Knew Susie (Like I Know Susie)" (Buddy DeSylva, Joseph Meyer) – 2:14
11. "On the Sunny Side of the Street" (Dorothy Fields, Jimmy McHugh) – 2:34
12. "The Silencers" (Elmer Bernstein, Mack David) – 2:13 (instrumental by Mike Leander)

== Personnel ==
- Dean Martin – vocals
- Ernie Freeman – arranger
- Gene Page
- Ed Thrasher – art direction
- Eddie Brackett – engineer
- Jimmy Bowen – producer
