= A Six Pack to Go =

Studio album by Hank Thompson
- Released: 1966
- Genre: Country
- Label: Capitol
- Producer: Ken Nelson

Hank Thompson chronology
Luckiest Heartache in Town (1966)	A Six Pack to Go (1966)	Breakin' the Rules (1966)

A Six Pack to Go is an album by country music artist Hank Thompson and His Brazos Valley Boys. It was released in 1966 by Capitol Records (catalog no. T-2460). Ken Nelson was the producer. The album consists of 12 songs related to drinking.

The album debuted on Billboard magazine's Top Country Albums chart on April 16, 1966, peaked at No. 19, and remained on the chart for a total of eight weeks.

AllMusic gave the album a rating of five stars. Reviewer Thom Jurek praised Merle Travis's guitar playing and concluded: "While the songs have a cherry feel to them, this is one dark record, and there is no redemption anywhere present. A classic."

== Track listing ==
Side A

1. "A Six Pack to Go"
2. "Honky Tonk Town"
3. "Hangover Heart"
4. "Beer Barrel Polka"
5. "Drunkard's Blues"
6. "Bubbles in My Beer"

Side B

1. "Hangover Tavern"
2. "The Wild Side of Life"
3. "Bartender's Polka"
4. "Anybody's Girl"
5. "Warm Red Wine"
6. "A Broken Heart and a Glass of Beer"
