= Sy Devore =

Sy Devore (1907–1966) was an American costume designer and tailor known as the "tailor to the stars" during Hollywood's golden era. Born Seymour Devoretsky in Brooklyn in 1907, he moved to Los Angeles in 1944 to create custom menswear, opening a store at Sunset Boulevard and Vine Street. He was known for outfitting the entire Rat Pack, and Elvis Presley, John Wayne, Jerry Lewis, Nat King Cole, and President John F. Kennedy were among his clients.

Devore worked as a costume designer on films including: Ocean's 11 (1960), The Nutty Professor (1963), Viva Las Vegas (1964), The Sandpiper (1965), and The Silencers (1966).

Currently, the brand is operated by Danny Marsh and the store is in Studio City, California on Ventura Boulevard.
