= Love, Prison, Wisdom and Heartaches =

Studio album by Connie Smith
- Released: April 11, 2024
- Studio: East Iris Studios
- Genre: Traditional country
- Label: Fat Possum
- Producer: Marty Stuart

Connie Smith chronology
The Cry of the Heart (2021)	Love, Prison, Wisdom and Heartaches (2024)

Love, Prison, Wisdom and Heartaches is a studio album by American country artist Connie Smith. It was released on April 11, 2024, via Fat Possum Records. It is the 37th solo studio album in Smith's recording career and is a collection of 12 tracks. The album contains covers of songs previously recorded by artists. Since its release, the album has received positive reviews from critics.

== Background ==
Connie Smith has been considered among country music's most "underrated" and "influential" artists. She first became known for a string of top ten singles beginning with 1964's eight-week number one US country song "Once a Day". After her commercial success waned in the late 1970s, she settled into domestic life but continued to sporadically return to her country career. This was in part due to the personal and professional collaboration she developed with Marty Stuart beginning in the 1990s. Since 1998, she has released four studio albums with her most recent being 2021's The Cry of the Heart (issued on Fat Possum Records). Fat Possum would also release Love, Prison, Wisdom and Heartaches.

== Recording and content ==
Love, Prison, Wisdom and Heartaches was produced by Smith's husband and musical collaborator Marty Stuart. It was recorded at East Iris Studios in Nashville, Tennessee. Unlike her most recent album projects, the collection is a series of cover songs. However, Smith herself did not describe the album as a covers disc. "I'm singing on behalf of my friends. Hoping to share them while passing along their songs." The album features songs first recorded by Merle Haggard, Loretta Lynn, George Jones and Dottie West.

== Release and critical reception ==
Love, Wisdom, Prison and Heartaches was given a surprise digital release on April 11, 2024. The physical version of the album released on May 24, 2024. The album has since received positive reviews. Billboard wrote, "Smith's voice is still an instrument of formidable power and style, while this gorgeous record is an essential listen for fans of old-school country." The Kingsport Times-News gave the disc a positive review as well, commenting, "Embedded within the tears and fears and aching breaking heart of Smith's new album stands like a statue the quest for hope."

== Track listing ==
Love, Prison, Wisdom and Heartaches
No.	Title	Writer(s)	Length
1.	"The Other Side of You"	William Broadwell Morgan	3:00
2.	"Once More"	Robert James Owens	2:34
3.	"One of These Days"	Vince Matthews	2:15
4.	"If You Won't Tell on Me (I Won't Tell on You)"	Dallas Frazier	2:45
5.	"Drifting and Dreaming of You"	Jesse McReynolds	3:07
6.	"Country Girl"	Red Lane; Dottie West	3:01
7.	"World of Forgotten People"	Loretta Lynn	2:09
8.	"Seattle"	Jack Keller; Hugo Montenegro; Ernie Sheldon	2:56
9.	"The Fugitive"	Casey Anderson; Liz Anderson	3:23
10.	"End of the World"	Arthur Kent; Sylvia Dee	2:44
11.	"Beneath Still Waters"	Frazier	3:11
12.	"The Wayward Wind"	Herb Newman; Stanley Lebowsky	3:23

== Personnel ==
All credits are adapted from the liner notes of Love, Prison, Wisdom and Heartaches. All session players are credited under the title "musician".

Musical personnel

- David Angell – musician
- Jimmy Buchanan – musician
- Gary Carter – musician
- Mick Conley – musician
- Dennis Crouch – musician
- Christian Davis – musician
- David Davidson – musician
- Stuart Duncan – musician
- Alicia Enstrom – musician
- Nick Gibbons – musician
- Sonya Isaacs – musician
- John Jarvis – musician
- Larry Marro – musician
- Paul Martin – musician
- Carole Rabinowitz – musician
- Sari Reist – musician
- Hargus "Pig" Robbins – musician
- Jodi Seyfried – musician
- Connie Smith – lead vocals
- Harry Stinson – musician
- Marty Stuart – musician
- Kenny Vaughan – musician
- Justin Weaver – musician
- Kris Wilkinson – musician
- Terry Wilson – musician

Technical personnel

- Mick Conely – recording engineer
- Karen Cronin – artwork/design
- Cronin Creative – artwork/design
- Nick Gibbons – mixing and mastering engineer, recording engineer
- Maria Elan Orbea – project coordinator
- Les Leverett – photography
- Cody Peavy – cartage, session photography
- Marty Stuart – photography, producer
- Trent Woodman – assistant engineer

== Release history ==
Region	Date	Format	Label	Ref.
North America	April 11, 2024	Music download; streaming	Fat Possum Records	
North America	May 24, 2024	Compact disc; vinyl LP	Fat Possum Records	
