= Roy Hogsed =

American singer-songwriter

- Born: Roy Clifton Hogsed; December 24, 1919; Flippin, Arkansas
- Origin: San Diego, California
- Died: March 13, 1978 (aged 58) San Diego, California
- Genres: Country
- Occupation: Singer
- Instrument: Guitar
- Years active: 1947-1954
- Label: Capitol

Roy Clifton Hogsed (December 24, 1919, in Flippin, Arkansas - March 13th, 1978) was an American country music singer. He is best known for his song "Cocaine Blues", which he took to number 15 on the country music charts in 1948. Although he was active in the music business for only seven years, "Cocaine Blues" has been widely covered. Roy Hogsed was the first artist to record the Rockabilly song Gonna Get Along Without You Now made famous by Teresa Brewer (1952), Patience and Prudence (1956), Skeeter Davis (1964), Trini Lopez (1967) and Viola Wills (1979).

== Singles ==
Year	Title	Chart Positions
Year	Title	US Country
1948	"Cocaine Blues"	15

== Discography ==
Year	Part #	Titles	Notes
Coast Records
1947	261	Daisy Mae // Red Silk Stockings And Green Perfume	as 'Roy Hogsed & The Rainbow Riders'
1947	262	Loafers Song (Livin' A Life Of Sin) // Cocaine Blues	as 'Roy Hogsed & The Rainbow Riders'
1947	265	Don't Telephone, Don't Telegraph, Tell A Woman // I Can't Get My Foot Off The Rail	as 'Roy Hogsed & The Rainbow Riders'
1947	266	Baby Won't You Settle Down // The Short Cut Cutie Polka	as 'Roy Hogsed & The Rainbow Riders'
1948	271	Come On In And Set A Spell // Happy Birthday Polka	as 'Roy Hogsed & His Rainbow Riders'
Capitol Records
1948	40120	Cocaine Blues // Fishtail Boogie	as 'Roy Hogsed'
1948	40133	Easy Payment Blues // The Short Cut Cutie Polka	as 'Roy Hogsed'
1949	40141	Take That Slow Train Thru Arkansas // Twenty-Five Chickens, Thirty-Five Cows (The Poultry Polka)	as 'Roy Hogsed'
1949	40220	Let's Go Dancin' // Dill Pickles	as 'Roy Hogsed'
1950	F40274	Cocaine Blues // Fishtail Boogie (reissue)	as 'Roy Hogsed'
1950	F40286	Rag Mop // Rainbow Polka	as 'Roy Hogsed Trio'
1950	F1201	The Red We Want Is The Red We Got (In The Old Red, White And Blue) // Don't Bite The Hand That's Feeding You	as 'Roy Hogsed'
1951	F1529	Shuffleboard Shuffle // Poco Tempo	as 'Roy Hogsed'
1951	F1635	Cocaine Blues // Fishtail Boogie (reissue)	as 'Roy Hogsed'
1951	F1721	Free Samples // I Wish I Wuz	as 'Roy Hogsed'
1951	F1854	The Snake Dance Boogie // I'm Gonna Get Along Without You	as 'Roy Hogsed'
1952	F1987	Let Your Pendulum Swing // (She's A) Mean, Mean Woman	as 'Roy Hogsed'
1952	F2083	Stretchin' A Point Or Two // Put Some Sugar In Your Shoes	as 'Roy Hogsed'
1953	F2350	Ain't A Bump In The Road // =Roll-'Em Dice	as 'Roy Hogsed'
1953	F2468	Red Wing // It's More Fun That Way	as 'Roy Hogsed'
1954	F2720	Who Wrote That Letter To John // Babies And Bacon	as 'Roy Hogsed'
1954	F2807	You're Just My Style // Too Many Chiefs And Not Enough Indians	as 'Roy Hogsed'
1954	F3007	I'm Hurtin' Again // Do You Call That A Sweetheart	as 'Roy Hogsed'

== Compilations ==
- Cocaine Blues (Bear Family BCD-16191, 1999)
