= Favorite Waltzes =

Studio album by Hank Thompson
- Released: 1959
- Genre: Country
- Label: Capitol

Hank Thompson chronology
Dance Ranch (1958)	Favorite Waltzes (1959)	Songs for Rounders (1959)

Favorite Waltzes is a studio album by country music artist Hank Thompson and His Brazos Valley Boys. It was released in 1959 by Capitol Records (catalog no. T-1111).

In the annual poll by Billboard magazine of country music disc jockeys, Favorite Waltzes ranked as the No. 14 album of 1959.

AllMusic gave the album a rating of two-and-a-half stars. Reviewer Bruce Eder described it as "sort of a novelty album" and concluded: "Not Thompson's most exciting record, but it makes for pleasant enough listening, and the musicianship is very solid."

== Track listing ==
Side A

1. "Shenandoah Valley Waltz'
2. "Wednesday Night Waltz"
3. "Signed, Sealed and Delivered"
4. "Skater's Waltz"
5. "Warm Red Wine"
6. "Fifty Year Ago Waltz"

Side B

1. "In the Valley of the Moon"
2. "La Zinda Waltz"
3. "Let Me Call You Sweetheart"
4. "The Anniversary Waltz"
5. "What Will I Do on Monday"
6. "Gold and Silver Waltz"
