= Squaws Along the Yukon =

Single by Hank Thompson
- B-side: "Gathering Flowers"
- Released: 1958
- Recorded: 1958
- Genre: Country
- Length: 2:28
- Label: Capitol
- Songwriter: Cam Smith

Hank Thompson singles chronology
"How Do You Hold a Memory" (1958)	"Squaws Along the Yukon" (1958)	"I've Run Out of Tomorrows" (1958)

"Squaws Along the Yukon" is a song written by Cam Smith, popularized in 1958 by Hank Thompson, and released in July 1958 on the Capitol label. An earlier version of the song, released in the 1940s, was recorded by Texas Jim Lewis and His Lone Star Cowboys.

== Lyrics ==
The song's lyrics evoke the Alaska Gold Rush of the late 1800s, a theme also used in other popular country songs of the time, including "The Gold Rush Is Over" (1952) and "North to Alaska" (1960). The language of the gold rush era is used throughout, including referring to seasoned prospectors as "sourdoughs", newcomers as "chechakos", and women as "squaws". The singer declares his love for a local native girl and includes light-hearted references to her beautiful figure, smile, and culture. The song repeats the phrases "ooga ooga mushka, which means that I love you" and "The squaws along the Yukon are good enough for me."

== Chart performance ==
In August 1958, it peaked at No. 2 on Billboard's country and western chart. It spent 22 weeks on the charts and was also ranked No. 27 on Billboard's 1958 year-end country and western chart.

== Controversy ==
In 2015, Bear Family Records included the song on an album titled "Politically Incorrect", consisting of songs considered inappropriate by modern standards.

When the song was played in 2016 on the satellite radio channel Willie's Roadhouse, a listener complained about the song's "misogynist and racial slurs." SiriusXM apologized for any offense caused by the "outdated and insensitive" references but defended the decision to play the song. The listener was not satisfied with the response and pursued a claim to the Canadian Broadcast Standards Council. The complaint resulted in a 2018 ruling that the Sirius XM breached Canadian broadcast standards by playing a song with discriminatory, degrading and derogatory references to Indigenous women. The panel noted:

In addition to the prominent use of the word “squaw”, references to a “salmon colored girl” and making underwear from the hides of grizzly bears, the nonsense language “Ooga ooga mooshka”, the line “The squaws along the Yukon are good enough for me”, and the paternalistic tone expressed throughout as exemplified by the line “Then I take her hand in mine and set her on my knee” combine to render the song all the more problematic. Taken together, the noted elements of the song demean and belittle Indigenous women.

== See also ==
- Billboard year-end top 50 country & western singles of 1958
