= A Million and One =

1966 song

- German release picture sleeve

Single by Billy Walker

from the album A Million and One
- B-side: "Close to Linda"
- Released: June 1966
- Genre: Country
- Length: 2:46
- Label: Monument
- Songwriter: Yvonne Devaney
- Producer: Fred Foster

"A Million and One"

Single by Dean Martin

from the album The Hit Sound of Dean Martin
- B-side: "Shades"
- Released: July 1966
- Genre: Traditional pop
- Length: 2:45
- Label: Reprise
- Songwriter: Yvonne Devaney
- Producer: Jimmy Bowen

"A Million and One"

Single by Vic Dana
- B-side: "My Baby Wouldn't Leave Me"
- Released: July 1966
- Genre: Traditional pop
- Length: 2:48
- Label: Dolton
- Songwriter: Yvonne Devaney
- Producer: Bob Reisdorff

"A Million and One" is a song written by Yvonne Devaney, which was a hit single for Billy Walker, Dean Martin, and Vic Dana in 1966.

== Notable recordings ==
"A Million and One" was first released by Billy Walker, in late May 1966. Walker's version reached No. 2 on Billboard's Hot Country Singles chart.

Dean Martin's version spent 7 weeks on the Billboard Hot 100 chart, peaking at No. 41, while reaching No. 4 on Billboard's Easy Listening chart. In Canada, Martin's version reached No. 64 on the RPM 100 and No. 23 on the CHUM Hit Parade.

Dean Martin's version was ranked No. 49 on Billboard's ranking of "Top Easy Listening Singles" of 1966.

Vic Dana's version spent 3 weeks on the Billboard Hot 100 chart, peaking at No. 71, while reaching No. 24 on Billboard's Easy Listening chart.
