= Fidlar (album) =

Studio album by Fidlar
- Released: January 22, 2013
- Studio: Shred Aloha Soundlabs (Highland Park)
- Genres: Skate punk; garage punk; surf punk; garage rock; lo-fi
- Length: 36:30
- Labels: Mom + Pop; Wichita; Dine Alone
- Producer: Fidlar

Fidlar chronology
Don't Try (2012)	Fidlar (2013)	Too (2015)

Singles from Fidlar
- 1. "Cheap Beer" Released: September 18, 2012

Fidlar (stylized as FIDLAR), is the debut studio album by California skate punk band Fidlar, released on January 1, 2013, through Dine Alone Records in Canada; on January 22, 2013, through Mom + Pop Music in the US; and on February 1, 2013, through Wichita Recordings in the UK. The album peaked at No. 5 on Billboard magazine's Top Heatseekers chart.

Ahead of its official release, the album premiered on Pitchfork's Advance streaming service.

== Critical reception ==
Professional ratings
Aggregate scores
Source	Rating
Metacritic	72/100
Review scores
Source	Rating
AllMusic	4/5 stars
DIY	9/10
NME	8/10
Pitchfork	7.0/10
Rolling Stone	3.5/5 stars
Spin	8/10

Ahead of its release, Fidlar was named as one of 2013's most anticipated releases by Time, The Huffington Post, Stereogum, and Consequence of Sound. At Metacritic, the album received an average score of 72 based on 27 critics, which indicates "generally favorable reviews".

== Track listing ==
All tracks are written by Zachary Carper, Elvis Kuehn, Max Kuehn & Brandon Schwartzel, except "Cocaine", written by Reverend Gary Davis.

No.	Title	Length
1.	"Cheap Beer"	2:22
2.	"Stoked and Broke"	2:02
3.	"White on White"	2:54
4.	"No Waves"	2:14
5.	"Whore"	3:40
6.	"Max Can't Surf"	2:39
7.	"Blackout Stout"	3:07
8.	"Wake Bake Skate"	1:44
9.	"Gimmie Something"	2:12
10.	"5 to 9"	1:08
11.	"LDA"	2:26
12.	"Paycheck"	2:54
13.	"Wait For The Man"	2:10
14.	"Cocaine" (song ends at 3:16, followed by hidden track "Cheap Cocaine", which starts at 4:20)	7:28

iTunes bonus track
No.	Title	Length
15.	"Awkward (Recorded at MANT, June 2013)"	3:04
Total length:		42:04

Japanese Edition bonus tracks
No.	Title	Length
15.	"Shitty Jobz"	2:48
16.	"I'm Going Nowhere"	2:07
Total length:		41:25

== Personnel ==
Fidlar

- Zac Carper – vocals, guitar
- Elvis Kuehn – vocals, lead guitar
- Max Kuehn – drums
- Brandon Schwartzel – bass guitar, vocals

Production

- Alice Baxley – photography
- Ryan Baxley – sleeve design
- Fidlar – recording, design, producer
- Rob Schnapf – mixing
- Milo Ward – artwork

== Charts ==
Weekly chart performance for Fidlar
Chart (2013)	Peak position
US Heatseekers Albums (Billboard)	5
US Independent Albums (Billboard)	38
