= White Ghost Shivers =

- Origin: Austin, Texas, USA
- Genres: Cabaret; Jazz
- Years active: 2000–present
- Website: whiteghostshivers.com^{[usurped]}

White Ghost Shivers is an eclectic American band based in Austin, Texas which claims cabaret, jazz, vaudeville, hokum, western swing, hillbilly, jugband and ragtime as its inspiration. The band has been declared "Best None of the Above" by the Austin Music Awards for 2005 and 2007.

== Band members ==
- Shorty Stump: vocals, tenor banjo, ukuleles, guitar, mandolin, kazoo, nose flute, tuba, jug
- Cella Blue: vocals, skirt-lifting, slide whistle, various sound effects, mover and shaker
- Smokebreak Slemenda/Detective Stain: vocals, lead guitar
- Hot Thomas/Sleepytime T: vocals, violin, tenor banjo
- Poppiticus/Ma poppitt: string bass, background vocals
- Ten-Penny Brown/Saturn: clarinet, tenor saxophone, jug
- Reese's Pieces/Baby-Faced Finster: stride piano, saw, uke
