= Golden Country Hits =

Studio album by Hank Thompson
- Released: 1964
- Genre: Country
- Label: Capitol
- Producer: Ken Nelson

Hank Thompson chronology
At the State Fair of Texas (1963)	Golden Country Hits (1964)	It's Christmas Time with Hank Thompson (1964)

Golden Country Hits is an album by country music artist Hank Thompson and His Brazos Valley Boys. It was released in 1964 by Capitol Records (catalog no. T-2089). Ken Nelson was the producer.

The album debuted on Billboard magazine's Top Country Albums chart on August 8, 1964, peaked at No. 6, and remained on the chart for a total of 16 weeks.

AllMusic gave the album a rating of three stars. One of Thompson's final albums for Capitol, reviewer Bruce Eder wrote that Thompson and his band "go out in style."

== Track listing ==
Side A

1. "San Antonio Rose"
2. "Pick Me Up on Your Way Down"
3. "The Wild Side of Life"
4. "Shot-gun Boogie"
5. "Back Street Affair"
6. "Detour"

Side B

1. "Wabash Cannon Ball"
2. "You Nearly Lose Your Mind"
3. "Yesterday's Girl"
4. "I'll Keep on Loving You"
5. "I Don't Hurt Anymore"
6. "Beer Barrel Polka"
