= I Will (Dick Glasser song) =

1962 single by Vic Dana, written by Dick Glasser

Single by Vic Dana

from the album More
- B-side: "Proud"
- Released: 1962
- Genre: Traditional pop
- Length: 2:29
- Label: Dolton
- Songwriter: Dick Glasser
- Producer: Bob Reisdorff

"I Will"

Single by Dean Martin

from the album Houston
- B-side: "You're the Reason I'm in Love"
- Released: 1965
- Genre: Traditional pop
- Length: 2:20
- Label: Reprise
- Songwriter: Dick Glasser
- Producer: Jimmy Bowen

Dean Martin singles chronology
"Bumming Around" (1965)	"I Will" (1965)	"You're the Reason I'm in Love" (1965)

"I Will" (released b/w "I Catch Myself Crying", Liberty 55707) is a song written by Dick Glasser.

The song was first a hit for Vic Dana in 1962, whose version spent 9 weeks on the Billboard Hot 100 chart, peaking at No. 47, while reaching No. 12 on Billboard's Easy Listening chart.

== Other versions ==
- Dick Glasser recorded the song, which he released in June 1964 under the pseudonym Dick Lory.
- Billy Fury released a version in 1964, which spent 12 weeks on the UK's Record Retailer chart, reaching No. 14.
- In 1965, Dean Martin released a version, which spent 10 weeks on the Billboard Hot 100, reaching No. 10, while reaching No. 3 on Billboard's Easy Listening chart, No. 5 on Canada's CHUM Hit Parade, and No. 11 on Canada's "R.P.M. Play Sheet".
- The song was recorded by Connie Smith for the 1966 album Born to Sing.
- Brazilian rock singer Raul Seixas has a Portuguese version on his 1968 debut album Raulzito e os Panteras.
- Ruby Winters released a version in late 1973, which peaked at number No. 39 on the US Hot Soul singles chart. In 1977, the song was released in the UK, where it spent 13 weeks on the UK Singles Chart, reaching No. 4.
- Declan Sinnott recorded the song on Christy Moore's 2009 album "Listen".
