= Somewhere There's a Someone =

Studio album by Dean Martin
- Released: February 1966
- Recorded: 1966
- Genres: Traditional pop, country
- Length: 30:12
- Label: Reprise - R/RS 6211
- Producer: Jimmy Bowen

Dean Martin chronology
Houston (1966)	Somewhere There's a Someone (1966)	Dean Martin Sings Songs from "The Silencers" (1966)

Somewhere There's a Someone is the eighteenth studio album by Dean Martin, produced by Jimmy Bowen.

== Overview ==
This was the first of five albums that Martin released in 1966, that year he also starred in three films, and appeared in his own television show. Somewhere There's a Someone peaked at 50 on the Billboard 200.

The title track, "Somewhere There's a Someone" was a Top 40 pop hit and appeared in the Top Five of the easy listening chart in the late winter of 1966. The song was in a familiar arrangement to his comeback hit, "Everybody Loves Somebody" from 1964.

Reprise Records had intended to record an album anchored by "Somewhere There's a Someone", which had been a hit for Martin in the Winter of 1966. Martin was too preoccupied with other work to record, so this album was issued featuring ten tracks from two of his earlier albums, plus the two sides of the "Somewhere There's a Someone" single.

"Any Time," "Blue Blue Day," "I'm So Lonesome I Could Cry," "I Walk the Line," and "Room Full of Roses" had been previously released by Martin on his 1963 album Dean "Tex" Martin: Country Style and "Candy Kisses," "I Can't Help It", "Bouquet of Roses," "Just a Little Lovin'," and "Second Hand Rose (Second Hand Heart)" had been on Dean "Tex" Martin: Country Styles follow-up, Dean "Tex" Martin Rides Again, also released in 1963. Despite the duplication of material, Somewhere There's a Someone became Martin's eighth gold album.

== Reception ==
Professional ratings
Review scores
Source	Rating
Allmusic	2.5/5 stars

The initial Billboard magazine review from March 5, 1966 commented that "Martin offers a beautiful and commercial program...which he performs to the hilt".

William Ruhlmann on Allmusic.com gave the album two and a half stars out of five. Ruhlmann commented on Martin's duplication of material from his earlier country music albums writing that "All the tracks were listed on the front cover, so you couldn't accuse Reprise of deception...But this was the most egregious example yet of Reprise's tendency to recycle its Martin catalog"

== Track listing ==
No.	Title	Writer(s)	Length
1.	"Somewhere There's a Someone"	Baker Knight	2:14
2.	"Anytime"	Herbert "Happy" Lawson	2:19
3.	"Blue Blue Day"	Don Gibson	1:45
4.	"I'm So Lonesome I Could Cry"	Hank Williams	2:36
5.	"Candy Kisses"	George Morgan	3:04
6.	"I Can't Help It (If I'm Still in Love with You)"	Hank Williams	2:42
7.	"That Old Clock on the Wall"	Ken Lane, Irving Taylor	2:57
8.	"Bouquet of Roses"	Bob Hilliard, Steve Nelson	2:56
9.	"I Walk the Line"	Johnny Cash	2:24
10.	"Just a Little Lovin'"	Eddy Arnold, Zeke Clements	2:03
11.	"Room Full of Roses"	Tim Spencer	2:57
12.	"Second Hand Rose (Second Hand Heart)"	Harlan Howard	2:15

== Personnel ==
- Dean Martin – vocals
- Ed Thrasher – art direction
- Artis Lane – cover art
- Jimmy Bowen – producer
