= Paul Westmoreland =

Paul "Okie Paul" Westmoreland (September 19, 1916 – June 21, 2005) was an American musician, songwriter, and disc jockey in Sacramento, California.

Born in Tyler Texas, he moved to California during the Okie migration.

As a songwriter he is best known for "Detour (There's A Muddy Road Ahead)", written in 1945, which became a big hit for Spade Cooley and was afterwards covered by Patti Page and many others. Other songs by Westmoreland include, "Lordy, Oh Lord" (1952), "Save The Pieces" (1953), and "What's Another Broken Heart To You?" (1953, with Joe Hobson).

He also recorded for Decca Records and toured with his own band in 1954. Included in his band was bass player Raymond "Cousin Ray" Woolfenden. Woolfenden was elected to the Country Radio DJ Hall of Fame in 1999.

Westmoreland died in California.

== Bibliography ==
- Gregory, James Noble. American Exodus: The Dust Bowl Migration and Okie Culture in California. Oxford University Press, 1991. ISBN 0-19-507136-0
- Pew, Thomas W., Jr. "Route 66: Ghost Road of the Okies". American Heritage (August 1977).
