= Fidlar =

American punk/garage rock band

FIDLAR
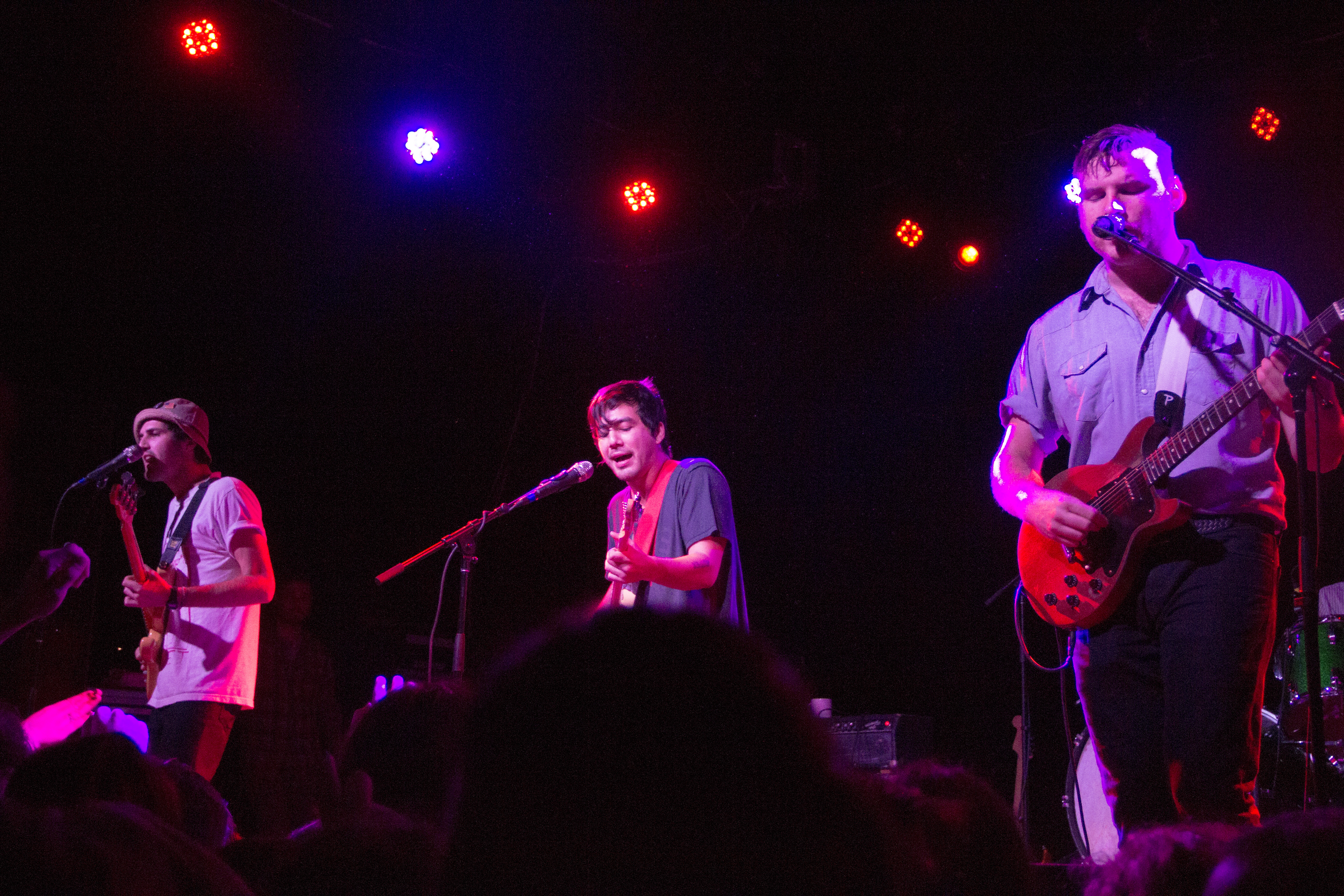
- FIDLAR performing in 2013

Background information
- Origin: Los Angeles, California
- Genres: Punk rock; garage punk; surf punk; skate punk; pop-punk
- Years active: 2009–present
- Labels: Mom + Pop; Wichita; Dine Alone
- Members: Zac Carper; Brandon Schwartzel; Max Kuehn
- Past members: Elvis Kuehn
- Website: fidlarmusic.net

Fidlar, stylized as FIDLAR, is an American punk and garage rock band from Los Angeles. The band's name is an acronym for Fuck It Dawg, Life's a Risk, a skate mantra stolen from singer Zac Carper's former roommates. Originally, FIDLAR went under the name 'Fuck The Clock', as referenced in their song "Cheap Beer". To date, the band have released four studio albums: FIDLAR (2013), Too (2015), Almost Free (2019) and Surviving the Dream (2024). The band are mostly known for short, fast songs that deal with partying and narcotics. In 2013, Pitchfork wrote that the band "don't make music you'll grow old with, and they won't get an "A" for originality, but that's not really the point".

== History ==
Founding members Zac Carper and Elvis Kuehn met while working at a recording studio in which Carper was employed as an engineer and Kuehn was an intern. The two started recording songs when the studio was empty and posting the finished products online. The band began playing house shows, many of which resulted in authorities showing up.

Three years after recording their first songs, they stepped on stage together with the Black Lips and went on tour with the Hives.

In 2011, they released their debut EP, DIYDUI, produced by Lewis Pesacov. In 2012, FIDLAR were named one of Stereogum's 40 Best New Bands of 2012. In October 2012, the band made their television debut on Last Call with Carson Daly, where they performed "Whore" and "No Waves" from their then-upcoming album FIDLAR.

The band is currently signed to Mom + Pop Music in the US, Wichita Recordings in the UK and Dine Alone Records in Canada.

== Musical style and influences ==
According to Jason Lymangrover of AllMusic, FIDLAR's music incorporates elements of "classic" skate punk, thrash metal, and "surfy" lo-fi indie rock. The instrumentation is described as "punchy, fast, loud." The band's influences include the Offspring and blink-182. The band's first studio album contains "slacker subject matter" pertaining to topics such as substance abuse, surfing and skateboarding. Yardbarker stated that "the band paid homage to the pillars of rock ‘n’ roll: hedonism, drugs, and booze." Stylistically, the album has drawn comparisons to Angry Samoans, Fear, Surf Punks, the Ramones and Circle Jerks. The band's music has been categorized as pop-punk.

== Other projects ==
Each member of FIDLAR has been involved in at least one side project. Carper has produced albums or helped co-write songs by such bands as Dune Rats, SWMRS, The Frights, Sweet Thing, The Goldberg Sisters, Dirty Sweet, and Tokyo Police Club. Schwartzel also periodically performs DJ sets at Monty's Bar under the pseudonym of "DJ Basil". Schwartzel & Max Kuehn are in a band with members of Together Pangea called Los Bolos. Max Kuehn has released solo compositions online, as well as being a member of The Squirmers, The Diffs and The Head Hunters with his brother Elvis, The Small Wigs, and Kitten, with Carper prior to, and during their full time in FIDLAR.

== Personal life ==
Elvis Kuehn (guitar/vocals) and Max Kuehn (drums) are the sons of Greg Kuehn, keyboardist for Long Beach punk legends, T.S.O.L. while Zac Carper (vocals/guitar) is the son of famed surfboard designer John Carper. Carper struggled with drug addiction and spent time in rehab for it, inspiring the song "No Waves". Bassist Brandon Schwartzel was Carper's friend before joining the band, with the two bonding over drugs and homelessness. The four have been performing together as FIDLAR since 2009. Carper was born in Hawaii, while the Kuehn brothers were born in Los Angeles, and Schwartzel was born in San Diego.

== Band members ==
- Zac Carper – lead vocals, guitar, keyboards (2009–present)
- Brandon Schwartzel – bass, backing vocals (2009–present)
- Max Kuehn – drums, percussion (2009–present)

Former members

- Elvis Kuehn – guitar, backing and lead vocals, keyboards (2009–2022)

Former touring musicians

- Danny Nogueiras – drums (2009–2010)
- Alice Baxley – bass (2010)
- Andy Miller – bass (2010–2011)
- Mikki Itzigsohn – bass (2009–2010)

== Discography ==
=== Studio albums ===
Title	Album details
Fidlar	Released: January 22, 2013; Labels: Mom + Pop, Burger (US); Wichita (UK); Dine Alone (Canada); Formats: LP, CD, cassette, digital download
Too	Released: September 4, 2015; Labels: Mom + Pop, Burger (US); Wichita (UK); Hostess (Japan); Formats: LP, CD, cassette, digital download
Almost Free	Released: January 25, 2019; Labels: Mom + Pop, Liberator, Dine Alone (Canada); Formats: LP, Flexi disc, CD, digital download
unplug	Released: August 5, 2023; Labels: Self Published; Formats: cassette, digital download
Surviving The Dream	Released: September 20, 2024; Labels: Self Published

=== Extended plays ===
Title	Extended play details
DIYDUI	Released: April 12, 2011; Label: White Iris; Formats: 7-inch, digital download
Don't Try...	Released: April 10, 2012; Labels: Mom + Pop (US); Wichita (UK); Formats: 7-inch, CD, digital download
Shit We Recorded in Our Bedroom	Released: October 15, 2012; Label: Self-released; Format: Digital download
Don't Fuck With Vol. 01	Released: December 15, 2022; Label: Self-released; Format: Digital download
That's Life	Released: March 17, 2023; Label: Self-released; Format: Digital download
Don't Fuck With Vol. 02	Released: May 19, 2023; Label: Self-released; Format: Digital download
Don't Fuck With Vol. 03	Released: March 22, 2024; Label: Self-released; Format: Digital download

== Certified singles ==
List of singles, with selected chart positions
Title	Year	Certification
"By Myself"	2019	ARIA: Gold

== Music videos ==
Year	Song	Director
February 2012	Wait for the Man	Ryan Baxley
February 2012	Max Can't Surf	Ryan Baxley
February 2012	Oh	Ryan Baxley
June 2012	No Waves	Ryan Baxley
October 2012	Cheap Beer	Ryan Baxley
November 2012	Gimme Something	Ryan Baxley
February 2013	Max Can't Surf (Fidlar Version)	Ryan Baxley
July 2013	Cocaine	Ryan Baxley
May 2015	40oz On Repeat	Ryan Baxley
July 2015	West Coast	Ryan Baxley
August 2015	Drone	Ryan Baxley
August 2015	Leave Me Alone	Ryan Baxley
January 2016	Why Generation	Ryan Baxley
April 2016	Punks	Ryan Baxley
August 2018	Are You High?	FIDLAR
September 2018	Too Real	Jonathan Atchley
January 2019	By Myself	Brandon Schwartzel
January 2019	Can't You See	Jonah Ray
June 2019	Flake	FIDLAR
August 2022	FSU	Alice & Ryan Baxley
October 2022	Sand on the Beach	Alice & Ryan Baxley
November 2022	Taste The Money	Ryan Baxley
February 2023	Centipede	Ryan Baxley
June 2024	FIX ME	Ryan Baxley & Brandon Schwartzel

== Appearance in media ==
The band also played on Jimmy Kimmel Live! in 2015, where they performed "West Coast" and "Why Generation" from their second album Too. The band was also featured on Conan, in 2016, where they performed "West Coast”"

- "No Waves" appeared in the video games Saints Row IV and The Crew and also in Netflix series Love.
- "White on White" was featured in the video game Sunset Overdrive.
- "Cheap Beer" was featured in the film Neighbors, the TV show iZombie and in Plan B's skateboarding film "True" during Pat Duffy's part.
- "Cocaine" was featured in the TV show Finding Carter and video game Grand Theft Auto V.
- "5 to 9" is played in the 16th episode of the fourth season of The Vampire Diaries
- "Wait For the Man" and "Oh" appeared on an episode of Shameless (US).
- "Cheap Beer" and "No Waves" both appeared on the soundtrack to The Crew.
- "Punks" appeared in the "Embrace Your Dark Side" promo for the fourth season of Arrow.
- "Drone" appeared on the soundtrack to the video game WWE 2K17.
- The band's cover version of the song "Red Right Hand" featured in the opening episode of series 4 of the BBC series Peaky Blinders.
- The band's cover of the Nirvana track "Frances Farmer Will Have Her Revenge On Seattle" was released on the Mom+Pop-exclusive Record Store Day 2018 3xLP compilation 10 Years of Mom+Pop.
- "Flake" appeared in the 11th episode of the third season of Thirteen Reasons Why
- "Flake" appeared in the 1st episode of Locke & Key
- "Breaker" appeared on the soundtrack to the 2020 film Bill & Ted Face the Music.
- "West Coast" appeared on the soundtrack to the 2020 video game Tony Hawk's Pro Skater 1+2.
- “Move On” is a single featured in the video game NHL 24
- "Low" appeared in the video game Skate

== Awards ==
- 2013: O Music Awards, Best Web-Born Artist
- 2013: Association of Independent Music, AIM Independent Music Awards, Best Live Act
