= Hank Thompson (musician) =

American country music singer-songwriter (1925–2007)

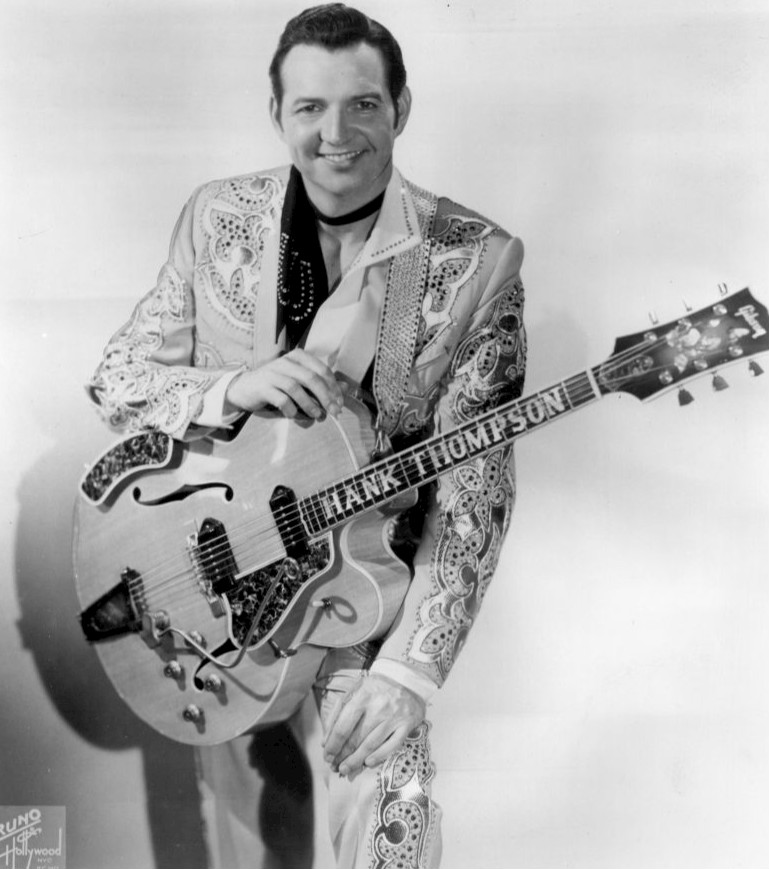
- Thompson in 1966

Background information
- Born: Henry William Thompson; September 3, 1925; Waco, Texas, U.S.
- Died: November 6, 2007 (aged 82) Keller, Texas, U.S.
- Genres: Country
- Occupations: Singer; songwriter
- Instruments: Vocals; guitar
- Years active: 1946–2007
- Website: www.hankthompson.com

Henry William Thompson (September 3, 1925 – November 6, 2007) was an American country music singer-songwriter and musician whose career spanned seven decades.

Thompson's musical style, characterized as honky-tonk Western swing, was a mixture of fiddles, electric guitar, and steel guitar that featured his distinctive, smooth baritone vocals.

His backing band, the Brazos Valley Boys, was voted the top Country Western Band for 14 years in a row by Billboard. Thompson pursued a "light" version of the Western swing sound that Bob Wills and others played; the primary difference between his music and that of Wills was that Thompson, who used the swing beat and instrumentation to enhance his vocals, discouraged the intense instrumental soloing from his musicians that Wills encouraged; however, the "Hank Thompson sound" exceeded Bob Wills in top-40 country hits.

Although not as prominent on the top country charts in later decades, Thompson remained a recording artist and concert draw until a month before he died in 2007.

The 1987 novel Crazy Heart by Thomas Cobb was inspired by Thompson's life, specifically by his practice of picking up a local band to back him when he toured. In 2009, Cobb's novel was turned into a successful film directed by Scott Cooper and starring Jeff Bridges in an Academy Award-winning performance.

== Biography ==
=== Life ===
Born in Waco, Texas, United States, Thompson was interested in music from an early age, and won several amateur harmonica contests. He decided to pursue his musical talent after serving in the United States Navy in World War II as a radioman and studying electrical engineering at Princeton University before his discharge. He had intended to continue those studies on the GI Bill following his 1946 discharge, and return to Waco. Later that year, after having regional hits with his first single "Whoa Sailor" for Globe Records, Dallas (Globe 124) and almost simultaneously "California Women" for another Dallas label (Blue Bonnet 123), he chose to pursue a full-time musical career.

In 1952, he brought his first number-one single, "The Wild Side of Life", which contained the memorable line, "I didn't know God made honky-tonk angels". (This line inspired songwriter J. D. "Jay" Miller to write the 1952 answer song "It Wasn't God Who Made Honky Tonk Angels", which became the first hit single for pioneer female country vocalist Kitty Wells.) Other hits for Thompson followed in quick succession in the 1950s and 1960s.

Thompson began singing in a plaintive honky-tonk style similar to that of Ernest Tubb, but desiring to secure more engagements in the dance halls of the Southwest, he reconfigured his band, the Brazos Valley Boys, to play a "light" version of the Western swing sound that Bob Wills and others made famous, emphasizing the dance beat and meticulous arrangements.

From 1947 to 1964, he recorded for Capitol Records, then joined Warner Bros. Records, where he remained from 1966 through 1967. From 1968 through 1980, he recorded for Dot Records and its successors, ABC Dot and MCA Records. In 1997, Thompson released Hank Thompson and Friends, a collection of solo tracks and duets with some of country music's most popular performers. In 2000, he released a new album, Seven Decades, on the Hightone label. The title reflected his recording history from the 1940s to 2000s.

Thompson was elected to the Country Music Hall of Fame in 1989, and was inducted into the Nashville Songwriters Hall of Fame in 1997. He continued touring throughout the U.S. until shortly before he became ill. Often, he worked with a reconstituted version of the Brazos Valley Boys that included a few original members.

=== Retirement and death ===
Thompson's last public performance was on October 8, 2007, in Waco, Texas, his birthplace. A smoker for most of his adult life, Thompson was admitted into a Texas hospital in mid-October for shortness of breath. He was diagnosed with a particularly aggressive form of lung cancer. On November 1, 2007, two days after being released, Thompson cancelled the rest of his 2007 Sunset Tour and retired from singing. He went into hospice care at his home in Keller, Texas, and died five days later, on November 6, 2007, aged 82.

According to Thompson's spokesman, Tracy Pitcox, president of Heart of Texas Records, Thompson requested that no funeral be held. On November 14, a "celebration of life", open to both fans and friends, took place at Billy Bob's Texas, a Ft. Worth country and western nightclub that bills itself as the World's Largest Honky-Tonk.

== Discography ==
=== Albums ===
Year	Album	US Country	Label
1952	Hank Thompson Favorites	—	Capitol
1955	Songs of the Brazos Valley	—	Capitol
1955	North of the Rio Grande	—	Capitol
1956	New Recordings of Hank Thompson's All-Time Hits	—	Capitol
1957	Hank!	—	Capitol
1958	Hank Thompson's Dance Ranch	—	Capitol
1959	Favorite Waltzes by Hank Thompson	—	Capitol
1959	Songs for Rounders	—	Capitol
1960	Most of All	—	Capitol
1960	This Broken Heart of Mine	—	Capitol
1961	An Old Love Affair	—	Capitol
1961	At the Golden Nugget	—	Capitol
1962	The No. 1 Country & Western Band	—	Capitol
1962	Cheyenne Frontier Days	—	Capitol
1963	The Best of Hank Thompson	—	Capitol
1963	At the State Fair of Texas	—	Capitol
1964	Golden Country Hits	6	Capitol
1964	It's Christmas Time with Hank Thompson	—	Capitol
1965	Breakin' in Another Heart	18	Capitol
1965	Luckiest Heartache in Town	17	Capitol
1966	A Six Pack to Go	19	Capitol
1966	Breakin' the Rules	22	Capitol
1966	Where Is the Circus	6	Warner Bros.
1967	The Best of Hank Thompson Vol. 2	34	Capitol
1967	The Countrypolitan Sound	—	Warner Bros.
1967	The Gold Standard Collection of Hank Thompson	42	Warner Bros.
1967	Just an Old Flame	—	Capitol
1968	Hank Thompson Sings the Gold Standards	—	Dot
1968	On Tap, in the Can, or in the Bottle	42	Dot
1969	Smoky the Bar	16	Dot
1969	Hank Thompson Salutes Oklahoma	38	Dot
1971	Next Time I Fall in Love (I Won't)	22	Dot
1971	Hank Thompson's 25th Anniversary Album	24	Dot
1972	Cab Driver (A Salute to the Mills Brothers)	10	Dot
1972	Hank Thompson's Greatest Hits Vol. 1	34	Dot
1973	Kindly Keep It Country	22	Dot
1974	Moving On	37	Dot
1975	Sings Nat King Cole	—	Dot
1976	Back in the Swing of Things	48	Dot
1977	The Thompson Touch	—	Dot
1977	Doin' My Things	—	Dot
1978	Brand New Hank	—	ABC
1980	Take Me Back to Tulsa	—	MCA
1982	One Thousand and One Nighters	—	Churchill
1986	Hank Thompspn	—	Dot/MCA
1988	Here's to Country Music	—	Step One
1997	Real Thing: Hank Thompson and Friends	—	Curb
2000	Seven Decades	—	Hightone
2013	Pathway of My Life	—	Bear Family

=== Singles ===
Year	Single	Chart Positions			Album
Year	Single	US Country	US	CAN Country	Album
1948	"Humpty Dumpty Heart"	2	—	—	singles only
1948	"Yesterday's Mail"	12	—	—	singles only
1948	"Green Light"	7	—	—	singles only
1949	"What Are We Gonna Do About the Moonlight"	10	—	—	singles only
1949	"I Find You Cheatin' on Me"	14	—	—	singles only
1949	"You Broke My Heart (In Little Bitty Pieces)"	15	—	—	singles only
1949	"Whoa Sailor"	6	—	—	singles only
1949	"Soft Lips"	10	—	—	singles only
1949	"The Grass Looks Greener Over Yonder"	15	—	—	singles only
1952	"The Wild Side of Life"	1	27	—	Hank Thompson Favorites
1952	"Waiting in the Lobby of Your Heart"	3	—	—	Hank Thompson Favorites
1952	"The New Wears Off Too Fast"	10	—	—	singles only
1953	"You're Walking On My Heart"	—	21	—	singles only
1953	"No Help Wanted"	9	—	—	
1953	"Rub-a-Dub-Dub"	1	—	—	Songs of the Brazos Valley
1953	"Yesterday's Girl"	8	—	—	Songs of the Brazos Valley
1953	"Wake Up, Irene"	1	—	—	singles only
1954	"Breakin' the Rules"	10	—	—	singles only
1954	"A Fooler, a Faker"	9	—	—	singles only
1954	"Honky-Tonk Girl"	9	—	—	singles only
1954	"We've Gone Too Far"	10	—	—	singles only
1954	"The New Green Light" (re-recording)	3	—	—	singles only
1955	"If Lovin' You Is Wrong"	12	—	—	singles only
1955	"Annie Over"	13	—	—	singles only
1955	"Wildwood Flower" (with Merle Travis)	5	—	—	singles only
1955	"Breakin' In Another Heart"	7	—	—	singles only
1955	"Most of All"	6	—	—	singles only
1955	"Don't Take It Out on Me"	5	—	—	singles only
1955	"Honey, Honey Bee Ball"	flip	—	—	singles only
1956	"The Blackboard of My Heart"	4	—	—	singles only
1956	"I'm Not Mad, Just Hurt"	14	—	—	singles only
1957	"Rockin' in the Congo"	13	—	—	singles only
1957	"I Was the First One"	flip	—	—	singles only
1957	"Tears Are Only Rain"	14	—	—	singles only
1958	"How Do You Hold a Memory"	11	—	—	singles only
1958	"Squaws Along the Yukon"	2	—	—	singles only
1958	"I've Run Out of Tomorrows"	7	—	—	
1959	"You're Going Back to Your Old Ways Again"	26	—	—	
1959	"Anybody's Girl"	13	—	—	
1959	"Total Strangers"	25	—	—	
1959	"I Didn't Mean to Fall in Love"	22	—	—	At the Golden Nugget
1960	"A Six Pack to Go"	10	102	—	At the Golden Nugget
1960	"She's Just a Whole Lot Like You"	14	99	—	At the Golden Nugget
1961	"Oklahoma Hills"	7	—	—	Cheyenne Frontier Days
1961	"Teach Me How to Lie"	25	—	—	Cheyenne Frontier Days
1961	"Hangover Tavern"	12	—	—	Cheyenne Frontier Days
1962	"I Cast a Lonesome Shadow"		—	—	single only
1963	"I Wasn't Even in the Running"	23	—	—	Luckiest Heartache in Town
1963	"Too in Love"	22	—	—	single only
1964	"Twice as Much"	45	—	—	Luckiest Heartache in Town
1965	"Then I'll Start Believing in You"	42	—	—	Luckiest Heartache in Town
1966	"Pick Me Up on Your Way Down"	—	134	—	Golden Country Hits
1966	"Where Is the Circus"	15	—	—	Where Is the Circus
1967	"He's Got a Way with Women"	16	—	—	On Tap, in the Can, Or in the Bottle
1968	"On Tap, in the Can, Or in the Bottle"	7	—	12	On Tap, in the Can, Or in the Bottle
1968	"Smoky the Bar"	5	—	9	Smoky the Bar
1969	"I See Them Everywhere"	47	—	—	Smoky the Bar
1969	"The Pathway of My Life"	46	—	—	Next Time I Fall in Love (I Won't)
1969	"Oklahoma Home Brew"	60	—	—	Hank Thompson Salutes Oklahoma
1970	"But That's All Right"	54	—	—	Next Time I Fall in Love (I Won't)
1970	"One of the Fortunate Few"	69	—	—	Next Time I Fall in Love (I Won't)
1971	"Next Time I Fall in Love (I Won't)"	15	—	36	Next Time I Fall in Love (I Won't)
1971	"The Mark of a Heel"	18	—	18	Next Time I Fall in Love (I Won't)
1971	"I've Come Awful Close"	11	—	19	Hank Thompson's 25th Anniversary Album
1972	"Cab Driver"	16	—	13	Cab Driver (A Salute to the Mills Brothers)
1972	"Glow Worm"	53	—	—	Cab Driver (A Salute to the Mills Brothers)
1973	"Roses in the Wine"	70	—	—	single only
1973	"Kindly Keep It Country"	48	—	45	Kindly Keep It Country
1974	"The Older the Violin, The Sweeter the Music"	8	—	4	Kindly Keep It Country
1974	"Who Left the Door to Heaven Open"	10	—	12	Moving On
1975	"Mama Don't 'Low"	29	—	—	Moving On
1975	"That's Just My Truckin' Luck"	70	—	—	single only
1975	"Mona Lisa"	—	—	—	Sings Nat King Cole
1976	"Asphalt Cowboy"	72	—	—	single only
1976	"Big Band Days"	86	—	—	Back in the Swing of Things
1977	"Honky Tonk Girl" (re-recording)	91	—	—	Back in the Swing of Things
1977	"Just an Old Flame"	92	—	—	The Thompson Touch
1978	"I'm Just Gettin' By"	92	—	—	Brand New Hank
1979	"Dance with Me Molly"	88	—	—	Brand New Hank
1979	"I Hear the South Callin' Me"	29	—	47	Brand New Hank
1980	"Tony's Tank-Up, Drive-In Cafe"	32	—	42	Brand New Hank
1980	"You're Poppin' Tops"	—	—	—	Take Me Back to Tulsa
1980	"King of Western Swing"	—	—	—	Take Me Back to Tulsa
1981	"Rockin' in the Congo" (re-recording)	82	—	—	One Thousand and One Nighters
1982	"Cocaine Blues"	—	—	—	One Thousand and One Nighters
1982	"Driving Nails in My Coffin"	—	—	—	One Thousand and One Nighters
1983	"Once in a Blue Moon"	82	—	—	single only
1988	"Here's to Country Music"	—	—	—	Here's to Country Music
1988	"Cowgirl Cutie"	—	—	—	Here's to Country Music
1997	"Gotta Sell Them Chickens" (with Junior Brown)	—	—	—	Hank Thompson and Friends

== Music videos ==
Year	Video	Director
1997	"Gotta Sell Them Chickens" (w/ Junior Brown)	Jim Gerik

== See also ==
- Academy of Country Music
- List of country musicians
- Country Music Association
- List of best-selling music artists
- Inductees of the Country Music Hall of Fame (1989 Inductee)
