= A Generation Ago Today =

Studio album by Kenny Burrell
- Released: 1967
- Recorded: December 16 & 20, 1966, January 31, 1967, and March 28, 1967
- Studio: Van Gelder Studio, Englewood Cliffs, NJ
- Genre: Jazz
- Label: Verve; V6-8656
- Producer: Creed Taylor

Kenny Burrell chronology
Have Yourself a Soulful Little Christmas (1966)	A Generation Ago Today (1967)	Ode to 52nd Street (1967)

A Generation Ago Today is an album by guitarist Kenny Burrell featuring standards associated with the Benny Goodman Sextet and Charlie Christian recorded in 1966 and 1967 and released on the Verve label.

== Reception ==
Professional ratings
Review scores
Source	Rating
Allmusic	4/5 stars

Allmusic awarded the album 4 stars with its review by Scott Yanow stating "the now-obscure set has been out-of-print for quite awhile [sic] but the music is excellent".

== Track listing ==
1. "As Long as I Live" (Harold Arlen, Ted Koehler)
2. "Wholly Cats" (Benny Goodman)
3. "A Smooth One" (Goodman)
4. "I Surrender Dear" (Harry Barris, Gordon Clifford)
5. "If I Had You" (Jimmy Campbell, Reg Connelly, Ted Shapiro)
6. "Poor Butterfly" (John Golden, Raymond Hubbell)
7. "Stompin' at the Savoy" (Goodman, Andy Razaf, Edgar Sampson, Chick Webb)
8. "Rose Room" (Art Hickman, Harry Williams)

== Personnel ==
- Kenny Burrell - guitar
- Phil Woods - alto saxophone
- Mike Mainieri - vibes
- Richard Wyands - piano
- Ron Carter - bass
- Grady Tate - drums

== For Charlie Christian and Benny Goodman ==
This is an re-issue by Verve with three additional tracks from the same recording sessions.

1. "As Long as I Live" (Harold Arlen, Ted Koehler)
2. "Poor Butterfly" (John Golden, Raymond Hubbell)
3. "Stompin' at the Savoy" (Goodman, Andy Razaf, Edgar Sampson, Chick Webb)
4. "I Surrender Dear" (Harry Barris, Gordon Clifford)
5. "Rose Room" (Art Hickman, Harry Williams)
6. "If I Had You" (Jimmy Campbell, Reg Connelly, Ted Shapiro)
7. "A Smooth One" (Goodman)
8. "Wholly Cats" (Benny Goodman)
9. Seven Come Eleven
10. Moonglow
11. Flying Home
