= Somebody Loves Me (film) =

1952 film by Irving Brecher

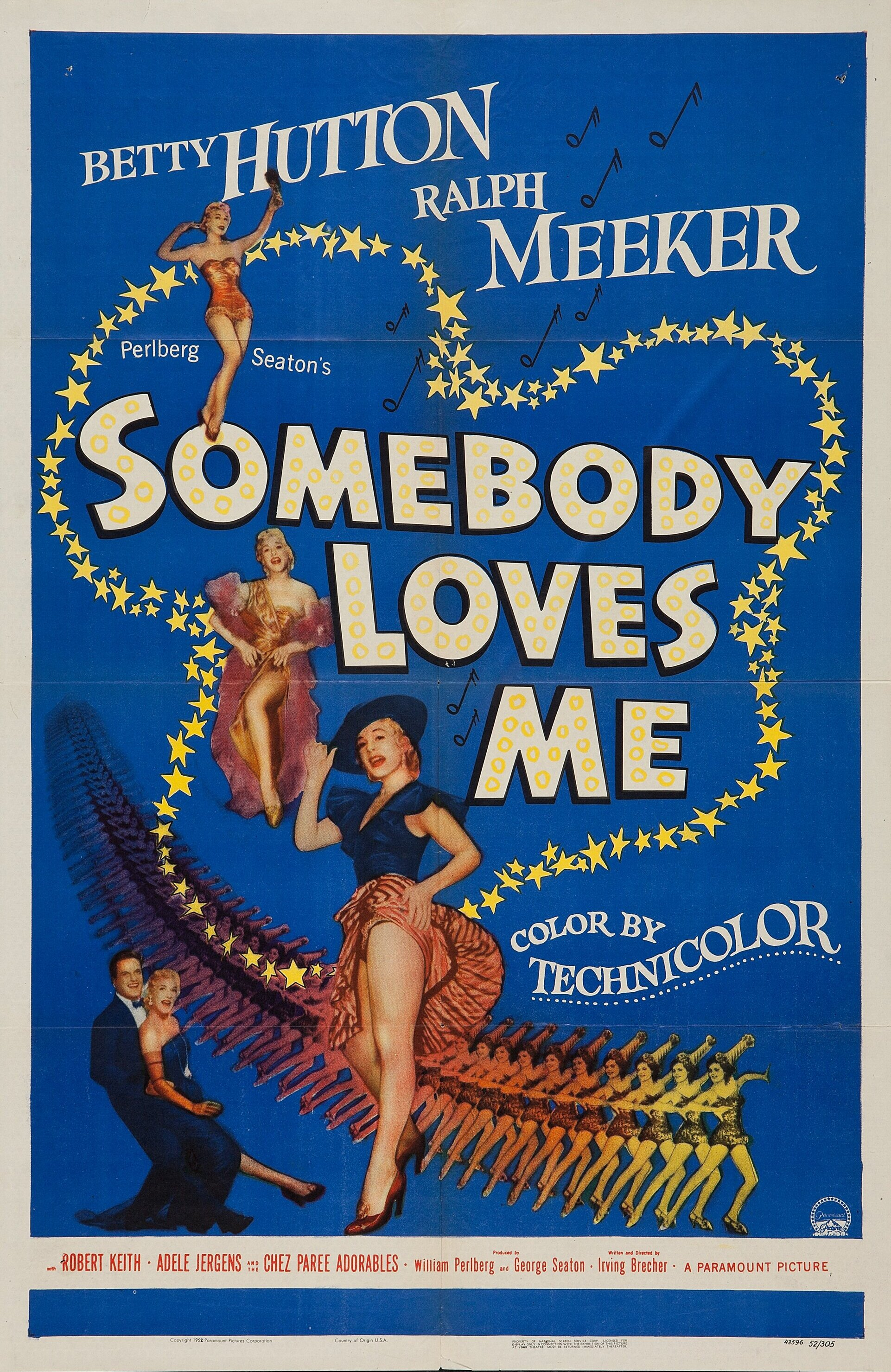
- Theatrical release poster
- Directed by: Irving Brecher
- Written by: Irving Brecher
- Produced by: William Perlberg; George Seaton
- Starring: Betty Hutton; Ralph Meeker; Robert Keith; Billie Bird
- Cinematography: George Barnes
- Edited by: Frank Bracht
- Music by: Van Cleave (uncredited)
- Color process: Technicolor
- Production company: Perlberg-Seaton Productions
- Distributed by: Paramount Pictures
- Release date: September 5, 1952
- Running time: 97 minutes
- Country: United States
- Language: English
- Box office: $2.2 million (US rentals)

Somebody Loves Me is a 1952 American Technicolor romantic drama musical film written and directed by Irving Brecher. It stars Betty Hutton and Ralph Meeker (Meeker's singing is dubbed by Pat Morgan), with Robert Keith, Billie Bird and Adele Jergens. It was produced by Perlberg-Seaton Productions, the production company of William Perlberg and George Seaton and released by Paramount Pictures.

The story is loosely based on the careers and relationship of entertainers and vaudevillians Blossom Seeley, played by Hutton and Benny Fields, played by Meeker. The film was Betty Hutton's last film with Paramount Pictures, with whom she had been under contract with since 1942. It was the film debut of Nick Adams where he plays an uncredited extra.

== Plot ==
In 1906 San Francisco Blossom Seely is an energetic performer in a club. Whilst performing, an earthquake strikes. The first theatre to reopen in the city since the earthquake is the Grauman Vaudeville theatre, where Blossom is set to next perform.

Blossom arrives with friends, Essie and her agent Sam Doyle. She requests to perform the song "Toddling the Todalo" only to find that Nola Beech, the arrogant star of the show with the top billing has demanded to sing the song and will be performing it instead of Blossom.

Whilst Nola is performing Toddling the Todalo in front of a large audience, Essie gives a monkey a banana and directs it onto the stage. The monkey eats the banana then throws the peel at Nola. This causes her to run off stage. Blossom scuttles onto stage and begins singing the song in place of Nola.

Blossom is suddenly catapulted into fame as San Francisco's number one vaudeville star and entertains people from San Francisco to soldiers fighting in the trenches during World War I.

After WW1, Blossom wishes to expand her act to include people other than herself mainly so she can change costumes between her numbers. She then goes to see a trio of performers, Benny Fields, Forrest and Henry and is particularly attracted to Fields. After the show, Blossom invites the three to work with her. Blossom performs with Fields, Forrest and Henry to applause. But Forrest and Henry wish to perform their own encore within Blossom's show which infuriates her and she fires them.

Blossom and Benny debut as a duo in Vaudeville with Blossom singing and Benny being the piano accompaniment. Much to Blossom's dismay, Benny tricks Blossom into singing the emotional song "Jealous" and she confronts Benny and threatens to break up their act. Benny then proposes marriage to Blossom and she accepts.

Blossom then goes on vacation without Benny to recover her singing voice. To her surprise Benny shows up at her hotel room with news. He tells her he has to leave their act and reveals that he only married Blossom for fame and was not in love with her when they married but loves her now and wants to prove that he can be successful on his own. He promises to return to her once he has become famous.

Back on Vaudeville, this time without Benny, Blossom performs to widespread acclaim amongst audiences. Backstage though, she feels incomplete without Benny and quits.

Benny, now in his own single act finds himself performing as a stooge with little to no pay. Sam is in the audience and confronts Benny backstage. Sam urges him to speak with Blossom partly because since she quit Vaudeville her finances and mental health have been in a dire condition. Benny returns to Blossom and they embrace. Benny tells Blossom that he doesn't want her to set him up with any work, as he still feels guilty about using her. Two months later, Benny finally gets a job at a club in Chicago. Backstage at the venue where he is set to perform, he overhears the organizers discussing how Blossom made a deal with them so that Benny would get the job. Benny confronts Blossom and she admits she pulled the strings. Benny swears that he will make a new single act just to spite Blossom. Later, Benny is interrupted by Sam. Sam tells Benny that Blossom plans to quit show business.

Benny forgives Blossom and they go on stage and sorrowfully sing Somebody Loves Me.

== Cast ==
- Betty Hutton as Blossom Seeley
- Ralph Meeker as Benny Fields
- Robert Keith as Sam Doyle
- Billie Bird as Essie
- Adele Jergens as Nola Beach
- Jack Benny as himself
- Henry Slate as Forrest
- Sid Tomack as Henry Lake
- Jeni Le Gon as Maid (uncredited)
- Nick Adams as Union Boy (uncredited)

== Soundtrack ==
- "Teasin' Rag" — (Written by Joe Jordan) Performed by Betty Hutton
- "I Can't Tell You Why I Love You But I Do" — (Music by Gus Edwards, lyrics by Will D. Cobb) Performed by Betty Hutton
- "Honey, Oh My Honey" — (Music by Jay Livingston & Ray Evans) Performed by Adele Jergens
- "Toddling The Todalo" — (Music by E. Ray Goetz, lyrics by A. Baldwin Sloane) Performed by Adele Jergens & reprised by Betty Hutton
- "Oh! Susanna" — (Music by Stephen Foster)
- "Gwine To Rune All Night" - (Music by Stephen Foster)
- "I Cried For You" — (Music by Gus Arnheim, Arthur Freed & Abe Lyman) Performed by Ralph Meeker
- "Dixie June" — (Writer and Lyricist Unknown) Performed by Betty Hutton & reprised by Ralph Meeker
- "On San Francisco Bay" — (Music by Gertrude Hoffman, lyrics by Vincent Bryan) Performed by Betty Hutton
- "Smiles" — (Music by Lee S. Roberts, lyrics by J. Will Callahan) Performed by Betty Hutton
- "Rose Room" — (Music by Art Hickman, lyrics by Harry Williams) Performed by Betty Hutton & Ralph Meeker
- "Way Down Yonder In New Orleans" — (Music by Turner Layton, lyrics by Henry Creamer) Performed by Betty Hutton
- "Jealous" — (Music by Jack Little, Tommie Maile & Dick Finch) Performed by Betty Hutton & Ralph Meeker
- "Love Him" — (Music by Jay Livingston & Ray Evans) Performed by Ralph Meeker & Betty Hutton
- "Wang-Wang Blues" — (Music by Gussie Mueller, Buster Johnson & Henry Busse) Performed by Henry Slate & Sid Tomack
- "Mister Banjo Man" — (Music by Jay Livingston & Ray Evans) Performed by Betty Hutton
- "Dixie Dreams" — (Music by Arthur Johnston & George W. Meyer, lyrics by Grant Clarke & Roy Turk) Performed by Betty Hutton (In Blackface)
- "I'm Sorry I Made You Cry" — (Music by N. J Clesi & Theodore Morse) Performed by Ralph Meeker
- "Thanks To You" — (Music by Jay Livingston & Ray Evans) Performed by Ralph Meeker
- "Somebody Loves Me" — (Music by George Gershwin, lyrics by Ballard MacDonald & Buddy DeSylva) Performed by Betty Hutton & Ralph Meeker

== Production ==
Filming took place from August till October 1951.

During filming, Hutton had a operation to remove a wart from her throat. Hutton also extensively trained to fit the singing style of Blossom Seely as Blossom had a lower vocal pitch.

Ralph Meeker was loaned from MGM to star in this film, though according to Hutton she wanted Frank Sinatra as her co-star but Perlberg and Seaton declined as Sinatra was suffering from throat problems at the time. Paramount originally intended for Robert Alda to play Fields, but he was occupied by his role of Sky Masterton in the original production of Guys and Dolls on Broadway. Hutton met her future husband, choreographer Charles O'Curran on the set of Somebody Loves Me.

== Release and reception ==
Somebody Loves Me premiered at the Chicago Theatre on September 5, 1952 and was opened by star Betty Hutton, cherographer Charles O'Curran, Charlton Heston, Hutton's leading man in her previous film The Greatest Show On Earth, Lydia Clarke, Blossom Seely, Benny Fields, Jan Sterling and Billy Daniels.

The Kokomo Tribune gave a favourable review, "On this authentic biographical framework have been built more than a dozen production numbers beautifully sung by Miss Hutton in a brilliant new singing style. Loud and brassy or sweet and low, she put over both the songs and the picture to great effect ... Adding to the over-all festivities is a wonderful supporting cast headed by Robert Keith as Blossom's understanding agent; Adele Jergens as a rival singer; Billie Bird as an acid-tongued companion to Miss Seely; and the talented "Chez Paree Adorables" who serve as delectable and enticing ornaments in the richly mounted surrondings."

A. H. Weiler gave a positive review of Hutton's performance in The New York Times writing that, "Aside from a wealth of noted old tunes, a couple of new ditties and the obvious talents of the ebullient Betty Hutton, who still sells songs as well as any plugger we know" They then go on to say that "Miss Hutton, who has enough changes of costume to please every woman's tastes, is equally adept at portraying the starry-eyed chanteuse who falls for a scheming pianist, she has all the bounce and verve of yore tempered, pleasingly enough, by occasional restraint in her emoting which makes for a convincing characterization."

== Radio adaption ==
Somebody Loves Me was adapted for radio and presented on the Lux Radio Theatre on April 27, 1953. The hour long adaptation starred Hutton, reprising her role as Seely and Gene Barry as Fields.
