= Doctor, Lawyer, Indian Chief =

1945 song by Hoagy Carmichael and Paul Francis Webster

"Doctor, Lawyer, Indian Chief" is a popular song published in 1945, with music by Hoagy Carmichael and lyrics by Paul Francis Webster. The title and lyrics are a play on the popular counting game "Tinker, Tailor." The song was introduced in the 1945 film The Stork Club by Betty Hutton. The biggest-selling version of the song was recorded by Hutton on June 29, 1945. The recording was released by Capitol Records as catalog number 220. The record first reached the Billboard magazine charts on December 6, 1945 and lasted 17 weeks on the chart, peaking at #1.

Another recording was made by the Les Brown Orchestra (with vocal by Butch Stone) on January 6, 1946. This recording was released by Columbia Records as catalog number 36945, with the flip side "Day by Day". The record first reached the Billboard magazine charts on March 7, 1946 and lasted 4 weeks on the chart, peaking at #6.

The composer Hoagy Carmichael recorded the song for the ARA label on October 23, 1945 (catalog number 128, with the flip side "Am I Blue?") and for the Decca label on December 9, 1946 (catalog number 23862, with the flip side "The Old Man's Sleepin'". A popular British version was recorded by Carole Carr with Geraldo and his Orchestra on September 11, 1945.

Other songs have referred to the same line from "Tinker, Tailor." The version of "The Gold Diggers Song" by the Boswell Sisters from 1933 featured the lyrics "Rich man, poor man, beggar man, thief / Doctor, lawyer, Indian chief / They're all in the money now." The lyrics of Johnny Otis's 1958 hit "Willie and the Hand Jive" mention "the doctor, the lawyer and the Indian chief." Bob Dylan's "Moonlight," from Dylan's 2001 "Love and Theft" album, includes this passage: "Doctor, lawyer, Indian chief / It takes a thief to catch a thief." Bruce Springsteen's "Man at the Top," from the album Tracks, has the line, "Rich man, poor man, beggar man, thief / Doctor, lawyer, Indian chief..." Joni Mitchell uses it in her song "Fiction": "What should I be? Which way to go? (Doctor, Lawyer, Indian Chief)."

Doctor, Lawyer, Indian Chief is also the title of a 2003 album by Thunderbirds Are Now! and a 2014 film by writer/director Pablo D'Stair.

Preceded by "Let It Snow! Let It Snow! Let It Snow!" by Vaughn Monroe	U.S. Billboard Best Sellers in Stores number-one single March 2, 1946 (Betty Hutton version)	Succeeded by "Personality" by Johnny Mercer
