= Darrell Huntley =

American actor

- Born: Darrell Franklin Huntley; August 28, 1917; Malta, Idaho, U.S.
- Died: August 1, 1995 (aged 77); Riverside, California, U.S.
- Occupation: Actor
- Years active: 1945–1957

Darrell Franklin Huntley (August 28, 1917 – August 1, 1995), was an American actor.

== Filmography ==
| Year | Title | Role | Notes |
|---|---|---|---|
| 1945 | The Stork Club | Chuck (fisherman) | uncredited |
| 1957 | Jet Pilot | Officer | uncredited |
