= Satins and Spurs =

1954 television film by Max Liebman

- Newspaper ad for the accompanying LP record album
- Written by: Billy Friedberg; Will Glickman; Max Liebman; Fred Saidy; Neil Simon
- Directed by: Max Liebman
- Starring: Betty Hutton; Kevin McCarthy
- Music by: Jay Livingston; Ray Evans
- Original language: English

Production
- Executive producers: Bill Hobin; Max Liebman
- Running time: 77 minutes
- Budget: $300,000

Original release
- Network: NBC
- Release: September 12, 1954

Satin and Spurs is a 1954 American musical comedy television variety special directed by Max Liebman and starring Betty Hutton and Kevin McCarthy, with Guy Raymond, Josh Wheeler, Edwin Philips, Neva Patterson and Genevieve. The special was the first of 28 variety musicals directed by Max Liebman for NBC and presented as part of the television series Max Liebman Presents.

This was the first NBC special broadcast in color. The special originated from NBC's color studios in the Midwood section of Brooklyn. NBC would produce later specials from here, including Peter Pan with Mary Martin.

Satins and Spurs was the television debut of Hutton, however, it was a disappointment for her and merely two weeks after Satins and Spurs first aired, Hutton quit showbusiness for two years.

== Plot ==
Cowgirl Cindy Smathers arrives in New York City with her cowboy buddy's, Tex and Dick, to participate in the Madison Square Rodeo. Cindy's publicist Ollie convinces her to pose for photographs and give an interview to Life magazine. Life magazine reporter Ursula and photographer Tony Barton, wait for Cindy to arrive. When Cindy does arrive, she immediately finds herself attracted to Tony, whilst Tony finds her lack of civility frustrating.

Tony informs Cindy that he'll be accompanying her morning, noon and night, to capture photographs of a cowgirl doing 'city activities'. Much to Cindy's dismay, Tony rejects her advances, adding that his assignment is strictly for business. Tony's first assignment with Cindy is dinner at a swanky restaurant. That night, when Cindy arrives at the restaurant, she begins performing to the patrons. When Cindy finishes, the patrons make it clear they disliked her performance and she storms out of the restaurant.

Soon after, Tony sends a letter to Cindy's apartment, inviting her to pose for photographs at a hotel, along with a record titled "How To Speak English". After Cindy earnestly attempts to follow the instructions on the record, Tony shows up, angering her and causing her to storm off. Tony then realizes that he loves Cindy, but stops himself from telling her.

Afterwards, Cindy wanders to a local bar where Tex and Dick are performing. Tony arrives and attempts to straighten things out with Cindy. Tony confesses his love to Cindy, but she remains unconvinced. Later, Tony arrives at Cindy's apartment to show her the magazine she is featured in. Cindy reads through the story and discovers the editors are congratulating Cindy and Tony on getting married. Tony explains to Cindy that unless they get married before the magazine goes to print, he'll be fired. Convinced that Tony's intentions are pure, Cindy agrees to marry him.

Tony then convinces Cindy to leave the rodeo as a producer on Broadway is casting her in an upcoming production.

== Cast ==
- Betty Hutton as Cindy Smathers
- Kevin McCarthy as Tony Barton
- Guy Raymond as Tex
- Neva Patterson as Ursula
- Josh Wheeler as Dick
- Edwin Philips as Ollie
- Genevieve as Chanteuse at restaurant
- Steve Allen made a special post-credits appearance to give a brief tour of the NBC Brooklyn studio and promote an upcoming special.

== Soundtrack ==
All the songs for the musical were written by Jay Livingston and Ray Evans.

- "Whoop-Diddy-Ay" — Performed by Betty Hutton
- "Wildcat Smathers" — Performed by Betty Hutton
- "Satins and Spurs" — Performed by Betty Hutton
- "The Little Rock Roll" — Performed by Betty Hutton and reprised by Guy Raymond
- "I've Had Enough" — Performed by Betty Hutton and Kevin McCarthy
- "Nobody Cares" — Performed by Betty Hutton
- "Back Home" — Performed by Josh Wheeler and Chorus
- "You're So Right For Me" — Performed by Betty Hutton and Kevin McCarthy
- "Sexy Sadie/Finale" — Performed by Betty Hutton and Chorus

The soundtrack of Satins and Spurs was released on a vinyl record by Capitol Records in 1954, with Hutton, the Textor Singers and Earl Wrightson, who replaced McCarthy's singing parts. The soundtrack was reissued on CD by DRG Records in 2003.

== Production ==
Hutton's salary for the film was $50,000, one of the highest amounts paid to anyone for a television performance at that point.

== Release and reception ==
Satins and Spurs aired on NBC between 7:30 to 9: P.M. on September 12, 1954.

Val Adams of The New York Times gave a negative review, writing that: "Despite the enormous energy of Miss Hutton, whose method of singing must have inspired the people who developed atomic energy, “Satins and Spurs" was a dull show. It lacked what should have been basic ingredients — originality, imagination and funny dialogue. Freshness came through only in stray moments, emphasizing more than ever the dullness of the performance. Evidently some mistakes were made way back when the idea for "Satins and Spurs" was first conceived. After seeing the program, it was difficult to tell if the producers had been thinking in terms of a musical comedy show or merely preparing an overlong song and dance nightclub act featuring Betty Hutton. Since Miss Hutton was on stage most of the time, and all other actors had extremely minor roles by comparison, one could infer that the producers felt the show needed only a star. They tossed her some undistinguished songs and let it go at that."

Time Magazine gave a more positive review: "Satins and Spurs (telecast in color) proved first-rate. The spectacular (a word detested by everyone at NBC, except the publicity department and President Pat Weaver) was big and tuneful. The book (by William Friedberg and Producer Liebman) contained the usual musical-comedy eyewash: Betty Hutton was cast as an untutored cowgirl who comes to Manhattan, falls in love with a LIFE photographer, falls out of love, falls back in love again. But it was a fine vehicle for the Hutton bounce and enabled her to do her brash singing and dancing against a background of Broadway, a fashion show and an intimate nightclub. Betty got excellent support from a pair of cowpokes (Josh Wheeler and Guy Raymond)."

== Award nominations ==
At the 7th Primetime Emmy Awards in 1955, Satins and Spurs conductor Nelson Riddle was nominated for "Best Scoring Of A Dramatic Or Variety Program" for his work on Satins and Spurs.
