= The Dean Martin Christmas Album =

Studio album by Dean Martin
- Released: October 1966
- Recorded: September 1966
- Genres: Christmas, traditional pop, jazz
- Label: Reprise - R/RS 6222
- Producer: Jimmy Bowen

Dean Martin chronology
The Hit Sound of Dean Martin (1966)	The Dean Martin Christmas Album (1966)	The Dean Martin TV Show (1966)

The Dean Martin Christmas Album is the twenty-first studio album by Dean Martin arranged by Ernie Freeman and Bill Justis.

== Release ==
This was Martin's only album of Christmas music released on Reprise Records (his only other Christmas album, A Winter Romance, having been released in 1959 on Capitol Records). It was reissued on CD by Hip-O Records in 2008, retitled A Very Cool Christmas.

This was the fourth of five albums Martin released in 1966. Billboard magazine reported in its December 3, 1966 issue that The Dean Martin Christmas Album was on top of its "Best Bets for Christmas" chart.

The release of The Dean Martin Christmas Album in October and The Dean Martin TV Show in November 1966 were accompanied by what Billboard described as a "merchandising avalanche" by Reprise Records and their parent company Warner Music. Billboard described Martin as running the "hottest streak of his career", and said that Reprise planned to sell $4 million of his records over the Christmas sales period. Billboard later reported that Martin had sold 850,000 albums in December 1966.

Ricci James Martin, Martin's son, wrote in a biography of his father that The Dean Martin Christmas Album was the only one of his father's albums that was played in the Martin household; his parents seldom listened to Dean Martin's music.

== Reception ==
Professional ratings
Review scores
Source	Rating
AllMusic	3.5/5 stars

Reviewing A Very Cool Christmas (a 2008 CD reissue of the Dean Martin Christmas Album) on Allmusic.com, William Ruhlmann gave the album three and a half stars out of five. Ruhlmann commented that Martin was in a "typically easygoing, good-natured mood on these tracks...He sings the seasonal material with the same nonchalance he gave to pop music of the period".

== Track listing ==
1. "White Christmas" (Irving Berlin) – 2:55
2. "Jingle Bells" (James Pierpont)
3. "I'll Be Home for Christmas" (Kim Gannon, Walter Kent, Buck Ram)
4. "Blue Christmas" (Billy Hayes, Jay W. Johnson) – 2:17
5. "Let It Snow! Let It Snow! Let It Snow!" (Sammy Cahn, Jule Styne) – 1:57
6. "A Marshmallow World" (Peter DeRose, Carl Sigman) – 2:44
7. "Silver Bells" (Ray Evans, Jay Livingston)
8. "Winter Wonderland" (Felix Bernard, Richard B. Smith)
9. "The Things We Did Last Summer" (Cahn, Styne) – 2:42
10. "Silent Night" (Franz Gruber, Josef Mohr)

== Personnel ==
- Dean Martin – vocals
- Ernie Freeman – arranger
- Bill Justis
- Ed Thrasher – art direction
- Eddie Brackett – engineer
- Lee Herschberg
- Jimmy Bowen – producer

== Charts ==
Chart performance for The Dean Martin Christmas Album
Chart (1966–2026)	Peak position
Canadian Albums (Billboard)	16
Croatian International Albums (HDU)	22
German Albums (Offizielle Top 100)	78
Latvian Albums (LaIPA)	66
Swedish Albums (Sverigetopplistan)	42
US Billboard 200	18
US Top Holiday Albums (Billboard)	16
