= The Dean Martin TV Show =

Studio album by Dean Martin
- Released: November 1966
- Recorded: 1966
- Genre: Traditional pop
- Length: 23:27
- Label: Reprise - R/RS 6233
- Producer: Jimmy Bowen

Dean Martin chronology
The Dean Martin Christmas Album (1966)	The Dean Martin TV Show (1966)	Happiness Is Dean Martin (1967)

The Dean Martin TV Show is the twenty-second studio album by Dean Martin accompanied by the Les Brown orchestra, with arrangements by Ernie Freeman.

== Overview ==
This was the last of five albums Martin released in 1966, it was named to capitalise on the immense success of his television show, The Dean Martin Show. The Dean Martin TV Show peaked at 34 on the Billboard 200, and was still on the charts in Spring 1967.

The album is not a soundtrack of The Dean Martin Show. Eschewing his recent country pop style, The Dean Martin TV Show was a collection of traditional pop standards, Martin's first such album in this vein since 1964's Dream with Dean.

The release of The Dean Martin TV Show and The Dean Martin Christmas Album in late 1966 was accompanied by what Billboard magazine described as a "merchandising avalanche" by Reprise Records and their parent company Warner Music. Billboard described Martin as running the "hottest streak of his career," and said that Reprise planned to sell $4 million of his records over the Christmas sales period.

== Reception ==
Professional ratings
Review scores
Source	Rating
Allmusic	3/5 stars

The initial Billboard review from November 26, 1966 commented that "The material is some of the best in the standard category...backed by exceptional Ernie Freeman arrangements and the Les Brown Orchestra, Martin is in top vocal form". William Ruhlmann on Allmusic.com gave the album three stars out of five. Noting that Martin's recent recordings had been a "lengthy series of country-pop hits that borrowed from the Nashville sound", Ruhlmann commented that Martin's album of traditional pop standards must have come as a "considerable relief" for his most "faithful fans".

== Track listing ==
1. "If I Had You" (Jimmy Campbell and Reg Connelly, Ted Shapiro) - 2:32
2. "What Can I Say After I Say I'm Sorry?" (Walter Donaldson, Abe Lyman) - 2:00
3. "The One I Love (Belongs to Somebody Else)" (Isham Jones, Gus Kahn) - 2:10
4. "S'posin'" (Paul Denniker, Andy Razaf) - 2:27
5. "It's the Talk of the Town" (Jerry Livingston, Al J. Neiburg, Marty Symes) - 2:20
6. "Baby Won't You Please Come Home" (Charles Warfield, Clarence Williams) - 2:05
7. "I've Grown Accustomed to Her Face" (Alan Jay Lerner, Frederick Loewe) - 2:12
8. "Just Friends" (John Klenner, Sam M. Lewis) - 2:37
9. "The Things We Did Last Summer" (Sammy Cahn, Jule Styne) - 2:37
10. "Home" (Harry Clarkson, Peter van Steeden) - 2:27

== Personnel ==
- Dean Martin – vocals
- Ernie Freeman - arranger
- Ed Thrasher - art direction
- Lowell Frank - engineer
- Stan Cornyn - liner notes
- Jimmy Bowen - producer
- Les Brown - conductor
- Bernie Fuchs - cover art
- Ken Lane - piano
