= A Winter Romance =

Studio album by Dean Martin
- Released: November 16, 1959
- Recorded: July 29 – August 6, 1959
- Studio: Capitol (Hollywood)
- Genre: Christmas
- Length: 33:34
- Label: Capitol
- Producer: Lee Gillette

Dean Martin chronology
Sleep Warm (with an orchestra conducted by Frank Sinatra) (1959)	A Winter Romance (1959)	This Time I'm Swingin'! (1960)

Singles from A Winter Romance
- 1. "Let It Snow! Let It Snow! Let It Snow!" Released: November 1959

A Winter Romance is the fifth studio album by Dean Martin, accompanied by an orchestra arranged and conducted by Gus Levene. While not exclusively a Christmas album, it features several songs associated with Christmas as part of its larger winter theme. It was Martin's only Christmas themed album for Capitol Records. Martin later recorded The Dean Martin Christmas Album for Reprise Records in 1966.

The original artwork featured a picture of Martin embracing a fetching young woman. At the same time, he is throwing a passing flirt at a second, attractive woman.

== Reception ==
Professional ratings
Review scores
Source	Rating
AllMusic	link

The initial Billboard magazine review from November 30, 1959, chose the album as one of its "Spotlight Winners of the Week" and commented that "The tunes are all one the winter kick ... Martin sings them with his usual ease and nonchalance ... A potent waxing for the holiday season".

== Track listing ==
=== Original LP ===
Capitol (S) T-1285

==== Side A ====
Track	Song title	Written by	Recording date	Session information	Time
1.	"A Winter Romance"	Sammy Cahn and Ken Lane	August 4, 1959	Session 7875S; Master 32161; Take 10	2:57
2.	"Let It Snow! Let It Snow! Let It Snow!"	Jule Styne and Sammy Cahn	August 6, 1959	Session 7882; Master 32194; Take 15	1:55
3.	"The Things We Did Last Summer"	Jule Styne and Sammy Cahn	July 29, 1959	Session 7851; Master 32147; Take 8	3:37
4.	"I've Got My Love to Keep Me Warm"	Irving Berlin	August 4, 1959	Session 7875S; Master 32164; Take 8	2:43
5.	"June in January"	Leo Robin and Ralph Rainger	August 4, 1959	Session 7875S; Master 32162; Take 6	2:46
6.	"Canadian Sunset"	Eddie Heywood and Norman Gimbel	July 29, 1959	Session 7851; Master 32150; Take 4	3:18

==== Side B ====
Track	Song title	Written by	Recording date	Session information	Time
1.	"Winter Wonderland"	Felix Bernard and Dick Smith	July 29, 1959	Session 7851; Master 32148; Take 7	1:51
2.	"Out in the Cold Again"	Rube Bloom and Ted Koehler	August 6, 1959	Session 7882; Master 32191; Take 12	3:34
3.	"Baby, It's Cold Outside"	Frank Loesser	August 6, 1959	Session 7882; Master 32192; Take 15	2:23
4.	"Rudolph the Red-Nosed Reindeer"	Johnny Marks	August 6, 1959	Session 7882; Master 32193; Take 4	2:15
5.	"White Christmas"	Berlin	July 29, 1959	Session 7851; Master 32149; Take 7	2:28
6.	"It Won't Cool Off"	Cahn and Lane	August 4, 1959	Session 7875S; Master 32163; Take 7	2:27

=== Reissues ===
The LP was reissued in 1965 as Holiday Cheer (Capitol STT-2343) as well as on the cassette tape, with different cover art and the song "A Winter Romance" omitted. This version charted for 11 weeks peaking at #12 on Billboard's Best Bets For Christmas album chart December 14, 1968.

==== The 1989 Capitol CD reissue added a thirteenth bonus track following to the original album. ====
Track	Song title	Written by	Recording date	Session information	Time
1.	"The Christmas Blues"	David Holt and Cahn	October 5, 1953	Session 3176; Master 11943–8; Take 8	2:54

==== The 2005 Collectors' Choice Music CD reissue added four (non-Christmas) bonus tracks to the original album. ====
Track	Song title	Written by	Recording date	Session information	Time
1.	"Meanderin"	Cy Coben and Charles Randolph Grean, George Botsford	September 15, 1951	Session 2309; Master 9022–7	2:58
2.	"Sogni d'Oro"	Marilyn Keith, Lew Spence and Alan Bergman	May 13, 1959	Session 7751; Master 31662–14	2:35
3.	"Go Go Go Go"	Jerry Livingston and Mack David	June 20, 1951	Session 2092; Master 7256–7	2:22
4.	"Buttercup of Golden Hair"	Mitchell Tableporter	May 15, 1959	Session 7757; Master 31694–3	2:18

== Personnel ==
- Dean Martin – vocals
- Gus Levene – leader
- Hy Lesnick – contractor
- Joseph R. (Bobby) Gibbons – guitar
- George Sylvester 'Red' Callender – bass guitar
- Louis 'Lou' Singer – drums
- James Rowles – piano on sessions 7851 and 7882
- Ray I. Sherman – piano on session 7875S
- Edward Ross – accordion on session 7882
- Kurt Reher – cello
- Eleanor Aller Slatkin – cello
- Kathryn Julye – harp on sessions 7875S and 7882
- Donald Cole – viola
- Alvin Dinkin – viola on session 7875S
- Virginia Majewski – viola
- David H. Sterkin – viola on session 7851
- Israel Baker – violin on session 7882
- Victor Bay – violin
- John Peter DeVoogt – violin
- Nathan Kaproff – violin
- Joseph Livoti – violin
- Daniel 'Dan' Lube – violin
- Erno Neufeld – violin
- Jerome 'Jerry' Reisler – violin
- Ralph Schaeffer – violin on session 7875S
- Felix Slatkin – violin on sessions 7851 and 7882
- Gerald Vinci – violin on sessions 7851 and 7875S
- Arnold Koblentz – oboe on sessions 7851 and 7875S
- James Briggs – saxophone on session 7882
- Mahlon Clark – saxophone on sessions 7875S and 7882
- Arthur 'Skeets' Herfurt – saxophone on session 7875S
- Edward Kuczborski ('Eddie' Kusby) – saxophone on session 7875S
- Harry Klee – saxophone on session 7882
- Ronald Langinger – saxophone on session 7875S
- Theodore M. 'Ted' Nash – saxophone on session 7851
- Emanuel 'Mannie' Klein – trumpet on session 7875S

== Charts ==
Chart performance for A Winter Romance
Chart (2018–2025)	Peak position
Austrian Albums (Ö3 Austria)	11
Danish Albums (Hitlisten)	8
Dutch Albums (Album Top 100)	5
Estonian Albums (Eesti Tipp-40)	22
Finnish Albums (Suomen virallinen lista)	13
German Albums (Offizielle Top 100)	4
Hungarian Albums (MAHASZ)	5
Icelandic Albums (Tónlistinn)	18
Irish Albums (Official Charts)	31
Italian Albums (FIMI)	27
Latvian Albums (LaIPA)	8
Lithuanian Albums (AGATA)	3
Norwegian Albums (VG-lista)	10
Polish Albums (ZPAV)	40
Portuguese Albums (AFP)	125
Swedish Albums (Sverigetopplistan)	9
Swiss Albums (Schweizer Hitparade)	17
US Billboard 200	61

== Certifications ==
Certifications for A Winter Romance
Region	Certification	Certified units/sales
Denmark (IFPI Danmark)	Gold	10,000^{‡}
United Kingdom (BPI)	Silver	60,000^{^}
^{^} Shipments figures based on certification alone.^{‡} Sales+streaming figures based on certification alone.
