= ARA Records =

U.S. record label (1944–1947)

ARA Records, or American Recording Artists, was an American record label in existence from 1944 to 1947.

== History of operations ==
ARA was founded by Boris Morros as part of his Boris Morros Music Company, a cover for his spying activities for the Soviet Union. The label's initial name was American Recording Artists, and its purpose was money laundering for Morros' Soviet handlers. His son Richard Morros acted in an A&R capacity, as did Dave Gould. Mark Leff acted as president. The label name was changed to ARA soon after becoming active.

ARA had two main factors going for it: It took advantage of several major entertainment names being dropped by their labels to quickly establish credibility, and also benefited from Morros' industry contacts. The label undertook recording activities in Hollywood, Chicago, and New York. The built a distribution network that rivaled the major labels. By August 1945 ARA had a national hit with Hoagy Carmichael's 'Hong Kong Blues', which placed at No. 6. Hits for the label continued into 1946, with 'Let It Snow! Let It Snow! Let It Snow!' by Bob Crosby was No. 14 in February, and ARA had a moderate hit with Carmichael's version of Doctor, Lawyer, Indian Chief (No. 18) in March 1946. That same month it also had a huge hit with Phil Harris' version of 'One-Zy Two-Zy I Love You-Zy' which held the No. 2 chart position for two weeks. Harris followed this up with a record entering the chart one week later, 'Darktown Poker Club' which reached No. 10. March 1946 was a busy month for the label, as it was reorganized as ARA, Inc. and acquired Symphony Records, a small classical label.

The label was in financial trouble by the middle of 1946. Lesh was in agreement to sell his interest in the company by that time. Although ARA had shut down its own pressing plant, it continued to contract work to other pressing plants and signed new major artists. Most operations were moribund by the end of Summer 1946, and majority ownership had been turned over to Morton Garbus, an attorney. The press reported ARA had $75,000 ($1.2 million US 2026) in masters that were unreleased. ARA entered receivership September 1946 in order to avert seizure by the IRS. Legal problems and financial wrangling followed for the next few months. Despite financial difficulties, ARA was producing hits. Hoagy Carmichael's recording of 'Ole Buttermilk Sky' was No. 2 for four weeks beginning October 1946.

== Aftermath ==
ARA's masters were put up for sale in a competitive bidding process. These sales, including music by Art Tatum and the soundtrack for Spellbound, were not always successful. Some of the 'winners' passed bad checks, and others who acquired the masters demanded their money back when they found out they discovered they could not use them unless the American Federation of Musicians was paid back-royalties owed. The total amount owed to AFM by ARA was reportedly $18,000. (~$260,000 US in 2026). Phil Harris made an initial offer to acquire his hit masters, but lost interest during the legal battles. Leff claimed he and his family had made loans totaling $550,000 (nearly US$8,000,000 in 2026) to ARA. Morros came clean to the FBI in July 1947, and turned double-agent. Litigation surrounding the company's operations was finally settled in 1949. Irving Mills acquired rights to the name and used it until the mid-1950s for his own recording operations.

== Artists who recorded for or signed to ARA ==
- Smiley Burnette
- Judy Canova
- Hoagy Carmichael
- Bob Crosby
- Skinnay Ennis
- Porky Freeman
- Ferde Grofé
- Stuart Hamblen
- Phil Harris
- Earl Hines
- Frances Langford
- Jan Savitt
- Ginny Simms
- Art Tatum
- Vatican Choir
