= Blossom Seeley =

American jazz singer, dancer, and actress (1886–1974)

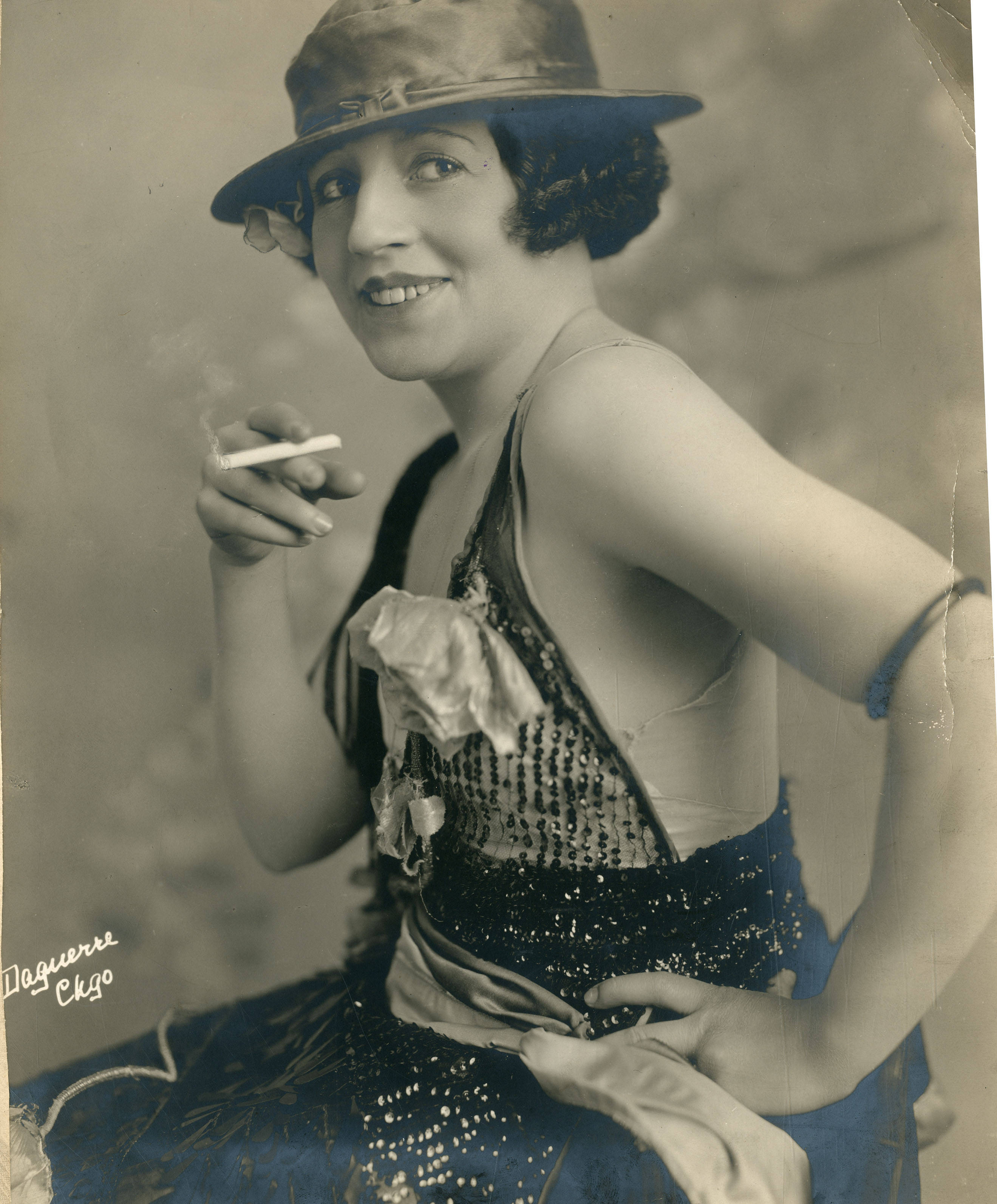
- Born: Minnie Guyer; July 16, 1886; New Haven, Connecticut, U.S.
- Died: April 17, 1974 (aged 87); New York City, New York, U.S.
- Occupations: Singer, actress, dancer
- Years active: 1908–1972
- Spouse(s): Joe Kane (1911–1913); Rube Marquard (1913–1920); Benny Fields (1921–1959)
- Children: 1

Blossom Seeley (July 16, 1886 — April 17, 1974) was an American singer, dancer, and actress.

== Biography ==
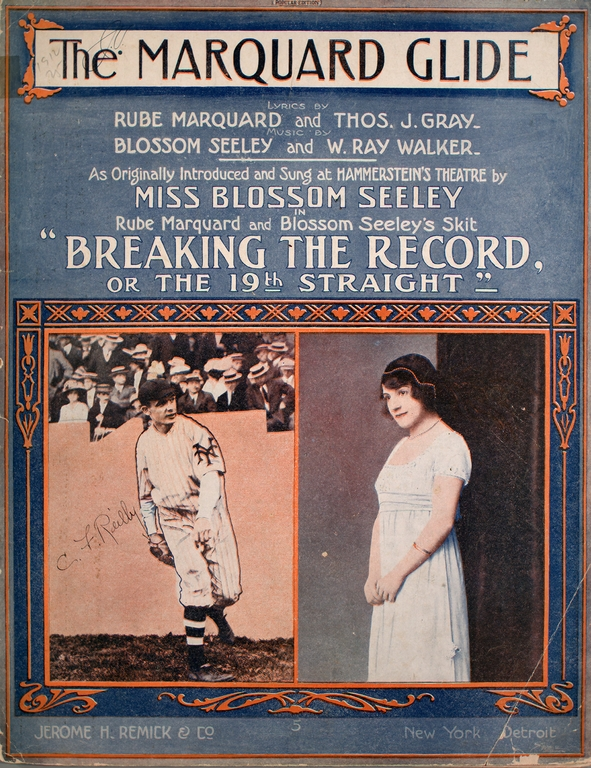
Sheet music cover for the Marquard and Seeley production.

Seeley was born Minnie Guyer (or Guiger) in New Haven, Connecticut, to photographer William F. Guyer (or Guiger) and his wife, Mertle F. "Minnie" Winson, who had married in 1880. In her teens, she was billed as "The Little Blossom" when she appeared at Sid Grauman's San Francisco, doing specialty acts. A top vaudeville headliner, she was known as the "Queen of Syncopation" and helped bring jazz and ragtime into the mainstream of American music. She introduced the Shelton Brooks classic "Some of These Days" in vaudeville in 1910, before Sophie Tucker recorded it in 1911.

Seeley was a major recording star, with a series of solo records in the 1920s, and her biggest hits included, "Way Down Yonder in New Orleans", "Rose Room", "Lazy", "Yes Sir, That's My Baby", and her signature song, "Toddling the Todalo". She was featured in singing roles in two pre-Code films in 1933, Blood Money (with George Bancroft, Judith Anderson (in her film debut), and Frances Dee), and Broadway Through a Keyhole (with Russ Columbo and Texas Guinan).

Seeley performing with Benny Fields in a 1927 Vitaphone Varieties short

Seeley was one half of the vaudeville team of Blossom Seeley and Benny Fields. When they played the Palace Theatre in its Golden Era, they always had the number-one spot, even when sharing the bill with such stars as Jack Benny, George Burns, Gracie Allen, and George Jessel. In 1927, they filmed one of the first Vitaphone sound shorts, Blossom Seeley and Benny Fields in which Blossom introduced the song "Hello, Bluebird", later repopularized by Judy Garland in the movie I Could Go On Singing. The story of their marriage and career was made into the movie Somebody Loves Me (1952) with Betty Hutton and Ralph Meeker, which revived their careers and led to a string of TV appearances on The Ed Sullivan Show.

Seeley and Fields also recorded three LP records in the 1950s for the Decca, MGM, and Mercury labels. Seeley continued to perform as a solo after Fields' death in 1959, and was one of the legends who starred on the 1961 CBS special Chicago and All That Jazz. She also sang on the accompanying Verve album, which was her first in stereo. She made two appearances on The Garry Moore Show and sang her version of the Frank Sinatra hit "My Kind of Town" on a 1966 Ed Sullivan Show. Her last TV appearance was with Mike Douglas, which he taped at the nursing home where she was living.

== Personal life ==
Blossom Seeley was married three times: to Joe Kane (né Joseph Cahen); to Baseball Hall of Famer Rube Marquard (né Richard William Marquard) of the New York Giants (a book by Noel Hynd detailing their relationship, Marquard and Seeley, was published in 1996); and to Benny Fields. She had one child, Richard William Marquard II.

On April 17, 1974, Seeley died at the DeWitt Nursing Home in New York City. She was 87 years old.
