= Benny Fields =

American singer and actor (1894–1959)

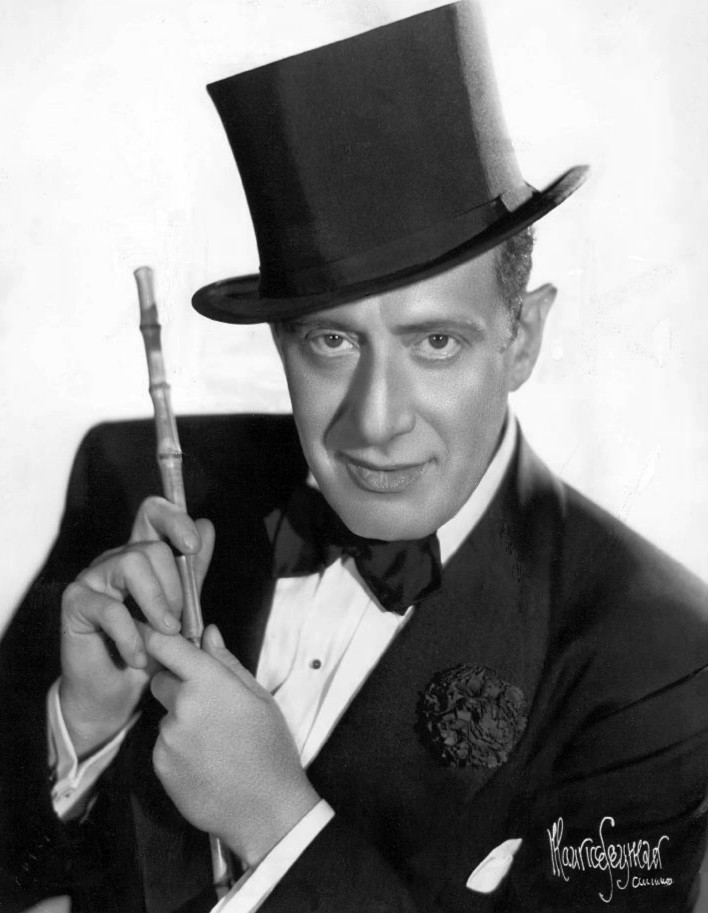
- Fields in 1946
- Born: Benjamin Geisenfeld; June 14, 1894; Milwaukee, Wisconsin, U.S.
- Died: August 16, 1959 (aged 65); New York City, U.S.
- Occupations: Singer; actor
- Years active: 1921–1959
- Spouse: Blossom Seeley (m. 1921)

Benny Fields, occasionally billed as "Bennie Fields" (born Benjamin Geisenfeld; June 14, 1894 – August 16, 1959), was a popular singer of the early 20th century, best known as one-half of the Blossom Seeley-Benny Fields vaudeville team.

== Early life ==
Born in Milwaukee, Wisconsin, Fields began his career in Chicago, as a singer in Al Tierney's popular café on 22nd Street. The tall young man had a gentle, easygoing way with a song, and held the listeners' rapt attention with tunes like "Melancholy Baby." Singer Blossom Seeley, touring in vaudeville, found Fields in 1921 and hired him to sing—offstage—in accompaniment to her solo numbers, Fields's voice gradually got more attention until he became a partner in the act. The couple was married in 1922, a year after he was hired by Seeley. Fields's laid-back stylings complemented Seeley's vivacious beltings beautifully, and Seeley and Fields became very successful on stage and in recordings.

== Career ==
Fields performing with Seeley in a 1927 Vitaphone Varieties short

In the late 1920s Warner Bros. filmed their songs and comic patter for Vitaphone short subjects. On radio, Fields was heard on The Ziegfeld Follies of the Air and other shows.

Fields and Seeley were well paid, saving and investing wisely. The couple believed they had no financial worries until the stock market crash of 1929 wiped out everything they had worked for. Vaudeville went into a steep and rapid decline at about the same time as the stock market. Fields and Seeley struggled until he launched a solo career in New York in 1933. Times were so hard that the couple filed for bankruptcy in New York State in 1936.

After Fields became an established star in his own right, Seeley retired in 1936 to simply be Mrs. Benny Fields. He appeared occasionally in films, most notably in The Big Broadcast of 1937, but remained a New York-based performer. In 1936 he recorded four sides for Decca, and in 1937 he recorded eight sides for Variety Records. In 1941 he filmed four three-minute musicals (including two of the Big Broadcast numbers) for Soundies.

== Comeback ==
Benny Fields made a surprise comeback in 1944. The low-budget PRC studio mounted its most ambitious production around Fields, and hired the imaginative Joseph H. Lewis to direct it. The finished musical, Minstrel Man, was a credit to the star, director, and studio. Reviewers were delighted by Fields's naturalistic performance—one critic described him as "a talent, voice, and personality the screen's been too long without." Minstrel Man was a personal triumph for Fields, and PRC had planned to follow it up with a true-life film biography of Seeley and Fields. The story would not be told until 1952, however, in the Paramount film Somebody Loves Me (1952), starring Betty Hutton and Ralph Meeker. Seeley came out of retirement during the filming of the movie. Following the release of Somebody Loves Me, they recorded three LP albums for the Decca, MGM, and Mercury labels and made occasional TV appearances on The Ed Sullivan Show.

Seeley and Fields were now semi-retired from performing in public, but George Burns fondly recalled a house party he threw in the late 1950s, when he asked the team to do one of their old vaudeville numbers. Seeley and Fields were rather embarrassed, worrying that their act wouldn't interest the many teenagers in the house, but at Burns's urging they sang—and their old magic captured the hearts of the young audience.

== Final years ==
Following Fields's heart attack in 1956, the couple had few engagements; Fields's medical expenses wiped out the payments they had received from Somebody Loves Me. In 1959, Fields asked Ed Sullivan, who was arranging a floor show for the Desert Inn hotel and casino in Nevada, for a spot on the bill for himself and his wife. Sullivan agreed; the couple played at the Desert Inn for a month, making a comeback with the engagement, which ended two weeks before Fields's death in New York City on August 16, 1959.
