= The Stork Club (film) =

1945 film by Hal Walker

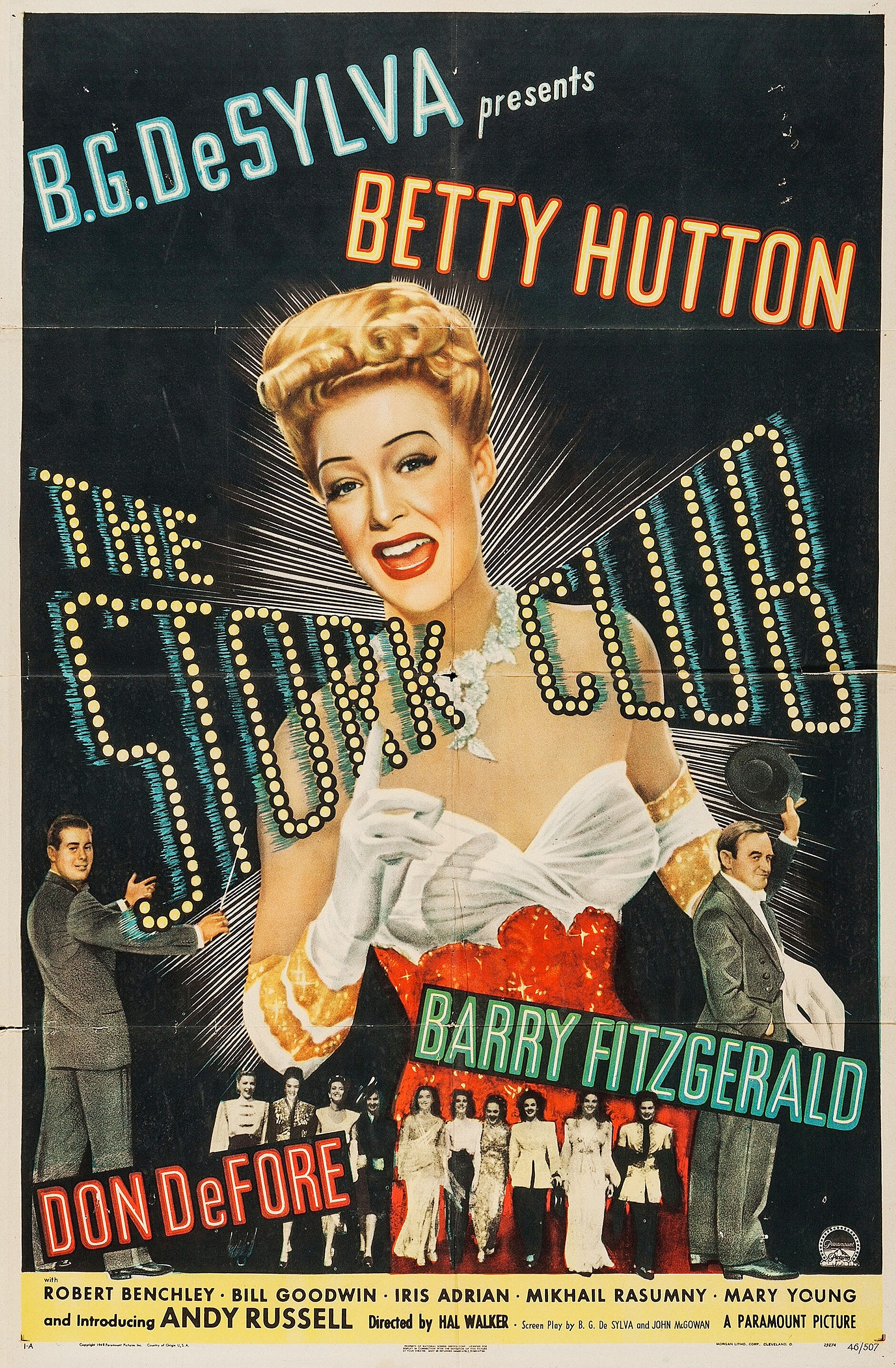
- Theatrical release poster
- Directed by: Hal Walker
- Written by: Buddy G. DeSylva; Jack McGowan
- Produced by: Harold Wilson (associate producer); Buddy G. DeSylva (producer; uncredited)
- Starring: Betty Hutton; Barry Fitzgerald; Don DeFore
- Cinematography: Charles Lang
- Edited by: Gladys Carley
- Music by: Robert Emmett Dolan
- Production company: B. G. DeSylva Productions
- Distributed by: Paramount Pictures
- Release date: December 19, 1945
- Running time: 98 minutes
- Country: United States
- Language: English
- Box office: $4 million+ or $3.2 million (US rentals)

The Stork Club is a 1945 American musical comedy film directed by Hal Walker and starring Betty Hutton, Barry Fitzgerald and Don DeFore, with Robert Benchley, Bill Goodwin, Iris Adrian, Mikhail Rasumny, Mary Young and Andy Russell. The film was produced by B.G. DeSylva Productions, the then newly formed production company of former Paramount executive producer Buddy DeSylva, and released by Paramount Pictures.

Betty Hutton introduced the song "Doctor, Lawyer, Indian Chief" in the film, of which Hutton's recording quickly reached number #1 on the Billboard Magazine charts.

The film follows a hatcheck girl called Judy Peabody, played by Hutton, who works at the prestigious nightclub the Stork Club. She saves a wealthy old man, Jerry Bates, played by Fitzgerald, from drowning; he, in thanks for her saving his life, anonymously sends her gifts and money. However, things are complicated when her bandleader boyfriend Danny Wilton, played by DeFore, returns from World War II.

== Plot ==
Judy Peabody is a hat-check girl at New York's popular Stork Club nightclub. Her dreams are for her bandleader boyfriend Danny to return home from the Marines, and to sing with his band.

While sunbathing on a dock, Judy saves an elderly man from drowning. She assumes from his disheveled appearance and folksy demeanor that he is poor, and calls him "Pop". She gives him her name and tells him where she works, and encourages him to contact her if he ever needs help again.

Unbeknownst to her, the man is the wealthy Jerry Bates, whom his lawyer Curtis refers to as "J.B." Bates instructs Curtis to anonymously reward Judy with everything her heart desires. Curtis sends a letter to Judy at the Stork Club, informing her she now has a new luxury apartment, and a line of credit at a prestigious department store, with no strings attached.

Bates, donning shabby clothes to conceal his wealth, visits Judy at the club. Assuming he is unemployed, she convinces the maitre d' to hire him as a busboy, a position Bates quickly sabotages.

Bates returns to the club to see Judy receive the letter. She promptly goes on a shopping spree, buying dresses and furs without knowing her benefactor's identity.

Assuming Bates is homeless, Judy offers him a room in her new apartment—and Bates, who has formed a fatherly attachment to her, and whose wife has recently left him, accepts.

Danny arrives home with plans to form a new band of top-flight musicians. He is excited to see Judy, until he sees her luxurious apartment and clothes and suspects she has become a "kept woman" in his absence. When he sees Bates at Judy's apartment, he believes his suspicions have been confirmed and breaks up with her.

When Danny finds out Judy has rented the other apartment on her floor for his band, he becomes cool to her. Judy continues to invest in Danny's band by buying new clothes for them using Bates' money. Bates is upset and wants to rein in her spending and asks his lawyer Curtis to tell her who he is. Curtis refuses, but Bates catches Curtis in the hallway to tell Curtis he works for him.

Danny meets with an agent but has trouble finding work for his new band. Judy phones Sherman Billingsley, the Stork Club's powerful but generous owner, and posing as gossip columnist Walter Winchell, tells him about a fantastic new band he must hear. Billingsley arrives at the apartment, where Danny's tuxedoed band and Judy perform brilliantly for him. Billingsley offers them a job at the club, then tells Judy: "By the way, I'd know your voice anywhere—and I was having lunch with Winchell when you called."

When Judy meets Bates's estranged wife, she finally learns that Bates is responsible for her new riches. Seeking to return his kindness, she engineers a reconciliation between them.

Meanwhile, Danny confronts Curtis and learns the truth about Judy's benefactor. Realizing she has been true to him, Danny apologizes to her—on the bandstand, during a song—and they are reunited.

== Cast ==
(in credits order)
- Betty Hutton as Judy Peabody
- Barry Fitzgerald as Jerry B. "J.B."/"Pop" Bates
- Don DeFore as Sgt. Danny Wilton
- Robert Benchley as Tom P. Curtis
- Bill Goodwin as Sherman Billingsley
- Iris Adrian as Gwen
- Mikhail Rasumny as Mr. Coretti
- Mary Young as Mrs. Edith Bates
- Andy Russell as Jimmy 'Jim' Jones

(partial remaining cast, in alphabetic order)

- Jean Acker as Dress Saleslady (uncredited)
- Sam Ash as Ringsider (uncredited)
- Mae Busch as Vera (uncredited)
- Anthony Caruso Joe – Fisherman (uncredited)
- Charles Coleman as MacFiske (uncredited)
- Catherine Craig as Louella Parsons (uncredited)
- Franklyn Farnum as Nightclub Diner (uncredited)
- William Haade as Army Sergeant Dancing with Judy (uncredited)
- Noel Neill as Jacqueline Billingsley (uncredited)
- William Newell as Higgins – Judy's Chauffeur (uncredited)
- Elaine Riley as Deb (uncredited)
- Grady Sutton as Peter – Salesman (uncredited)
- Pierre Watkin as Mr. Gray (uncredited)
- Audrey Young as Jenny (uncredited)

== Soundtrack ==
- "Love Me" — (Music by Jule Styne and Lyrics by Sammy Cahn) Performed by Andy Russell
- "Doctor, Lawyer, Indian Chief" — (Music by Hoagy Carmichael, Lyrics by Paul Francis Webster) Performed by Betty Hutton
- "If I Had A Dozen Hearts"— (Music by Harry Revel, Lyrics by Paul Francis Webster) Performed by Betty Hutton and Andy Russell
- "I'm A Square In The Social Circle" — (Music and lyrics by Jay Livingston and Ray Evans) Performed by Betty Hutton
- "In the Shade of the Old Apple Tree" — (Music by Egbert Van Alstyne, Lyrics by Harry Williams) Performed by Betty Hutton, Barry Fitzgerald and Mary Young

== Production ==
Filming took place from April 16th, 1945 to June 9th, 1945.

Danny Kaye was originally meant to be Hutton's leading man in the film.

Noel Madison was to make his directorial debut with The Stork Club but was replaced by Hal Walker after he withdrew. Buddy DeSylva oversaw and produced the film, but withdrew in July 1945 due to illness so associate producer Harold Wilson filled in for DeSylva for the remainder of the film's production.

Over 700 photos were taken of the real life Stork Club, in order to create an accurate replica of the club in Hollywood.

== Release and reception ==
The film premiered at the Paramount Theatre in New York City on December 19th, 1945 with a stage show headed by Woody Herman and Frances Wayne.

Writing for The New York Times, Bosley Crowther said that, "A bright and beribboned Christmas package was opened at the Paramount yesterday to reveal a purely frivolous donation, but one which is good for lots of laughs. It goes by the name of "The Stork Club," and it has as principals in its cast the tom-boisterous Betty Hutton and the roguish Barry Fitzgerald. With these two playing its farce comedy in an agile and debonair style, the silliness of its story is neatly and pleasantly disguised.That story—which really hasn't very much to do with the titular East-Side night resort—is all about a Cinderella who checks hats at that popular water-hole and who saves an elderly gentleman from drowning on one of her afternoons off."

Photoplay Magazine wrote that, "The day was when Betty Hutton was both loud and funny. In “The Stork Club” she’s more loud and less funny through no fault of her own, we may say. There just isn’t enough newness in the story to lift it too far above average. On the other hand, there’s sufficient good music and liveliness to keep it above average. Knowing Mr. Sherman Billingsley personally, we doubt if the writers had any serious intention of capturing his real personality. It looked to us as if he were dragged in for story purposes only. But the Stork itself is authentically presented."
