= Let It Snow! Let It Snow! Let It Snow! =

Song written and composed by Jule Styne and Sammy Cahn

Single by Vaughn Monroe
- Published: 1945
- Composer: Jule Styne
- Lyricist: Sammy Cahn

"Let It Snow! Let It Snow! Let It Snow!", also known as simply "Let It Snow", is a song written by lyricist Sammy Cahn and composer Jule Styne in July 1945 in Hollywood, California, during a heatwave as Cahn and Styne imagined cooler conditions. The song was first recorded that fall by Vaughn Monroe, was released just after Thanksgiving, and became a hit by Christmas.

Other U.S. recordings during the 1945–46 winter season included those by Danny O'Neil (Majestic), Connee Boswell (Decca), Woody Herman (Columbia), and Bob Crosby (ARA).

Due to its wintry setting and lighthearted tone, the song has come to be associated with Christmas, even though the lyrics never once mention the holiday. Instead, the song seems to describe the affection between two lovers spending time together during a snowstorm. Nevertheless, in the United States the song has come to be regarded as a Christmas classic, and is often played on radio stations during the Christmas and holiday season. It has been covered by multiple artists on Christmas-themed albums.

== Vaughn Monroe version ==
In the U.S., the Monroe record charted higher—by several of Billboard magazine's measures—than has any successor. For 15 weeks, through 30 March 1946, it appeared in its "Honor Roll of Hits: The Nation’s Top 15 Tunes." In the "Songs with Greatest Radio Audiences" category, it was listed for 16 weeks (again through 30 March 1946). Of Billboard's "Top 15 Most Played on the Air," the Monroe recording charted for 13 weeks—five of them at #1 in January–February 1946. In Billboard's "Best Selling Popular Retail Records" tabulation, it spent 13 weeks in the top ten (three weeks as #1). Sheet music sales were similarly high during this period, spending 10 weeks in Billboard's top ten through 23 March 1946.

== Frank Sinatra version ==
"Let It Snow! Let It Snow! Let It Snow!"

Single by Frank Sinatra
- B-side: "Remember Me in Your Dreams"
- Released: 1950
- Genre: Christmas; traditional pop
- Length: 2:36
- Label: Columbia
- Composer: Jule Styne
- Lyricist: Sammy Cahn

American singer Frank Sinatra released a version as a single in 1950 that featured The B. Swanson Quartet.

=== Charts ===
==== Weekly charts ====
Weekly chart performance
Chart (1950–2024)	Peak position
Australia (ARIA)	17
Austria (Ö3 Austria Top 40)	52
Belgium (Ultratop 50 Flanders)	36
Belgium (Ultratop 50 Wallonia)	34
Canada Hot 100 (Billboard)	28
Czech Republic Singles Digital (ČNS IFPI)	13
Estonia Airplay (TopHit)	41
Finland (Suomen virallinen lista)	13
France (SNEP)	43
Germany (GfK)	65
Global 200 (Billboard)	41
Greece International Digital (IFPI)	22
Hungary (Single Top 40)	22
Hungary (Stream Top 40)	6
Ireland (IRMA)	34
Italy (FIMI)	33
Latvia Streaming (LaIPA)	9
Lithuania (AGATA)	19
Luxembourg (Billboard)	25
Netherlands (Single Top 100)	16
New Zealand (Recorded Music NZ)	15
Poland (Polish Streaming Top 100)	38
Portugal (AFP)	19
Slovakia Singles Digital (ČNS IFPI)	19
Spain (PROMUSICAE)	69
Sweden (Sverigetopplistan)	12
Switzerland (Schweizer Hitparade)	16
UK Singles (Official Charts)	33
US Holiday 100 (Billboard)	45
US Rolling Stone Top 100	81

==== Monthly charts ====
Monthly chart performance
Chart (2025)	Peak position
Estonia Airplay (TopHit)	70

=== Certifications ===
Certifications for "Let It Snow! Let It Snow! Let It Snow!" by Frank Sinatra
Region	Certification	Certified units/sales
Australia (ARIA)	Platinum	70,000^{‡}
Denmark (IFPI Danmark)	Platinum	90,000^{‡}
Italy (FIMI)	Platinum	100,000^{‡}
New Zealand (RMNZ)	Platinum	30,000^{‡}
Portugal (AFP)	Platinum	25,000^{‡}
United Kingdom (BPI)	Platinum	600,000^{‡}
Streaming
Greece (IFPI Greece)	Gold	1,000,000^{†}
^{‡} Sales+streaming figures based on certification alone.^{†} Streaming-only figures based on certification alone.

== Dean Martin version ==
"Let It Snow! Let It Snow! Let It Snow!"

Single by Dean Martin

from the album A Winter Romance
- Released: 1959
- Genre: Christmas; traditional pop
- Length: 1:53
- Label: Capitol
- Composer: Jule Styne
- Lyricist: Sammy Cahn

Dean Martin singles chronology
"I Ain't Gonna Lead This Life No More" (1959)	"Let It Snow! Let It Snow! Let It Snow!" (1959)	"Love Me, My Love" (1960)

American singer Dean Martin released a version of the song in 1959, as part of his album A Winter Romance, and a re-recorded version in 1966, as part of The Dean Martin Christmas Album. The song entered the Billboard Hot 100 for the first time in 2018 and every year since, peaking at number 7 through 2026, with a total of 29 weeks in the Top 100.

=== Weekly charts ===
Chart (1966–2026)	Peak position
Australia (ARIA)	12
Austria (Ö3 Austria Top 40)	7
Belgium (Ultratop 50 Flanders)	18
Belgium (Ultratop 50 Wallonia)	12
Canada (Canadian Hot 100)	9
Croatia (Billboard)	9
Czech Republic Singles Digital (ČNS IFPI)	10
Denmark (Tracklisten)	15
Estonia Airplay (TopHit)	86
Finland (Suomen virallinen lista)	11
France (SNEP)	11
Germany (GfK)	5
Global 200 (Billboard)	6
Greece International Streaming (IFPI)	4
Hungary (Single Top 40)	9
Hungary (Stream Top 40)	9
Iceland (Tónlistinn)	13
Ireland (IRMA)	8
Italy (FIMI)	5
Latvia Streaming (LaIPA)	4
Lithuania (AGATA)	4
Luxembourg (Billboard)	4
Moldova Airplay (TopHit)	40
Netherlands (Single Top 100)	15
New Zealand (Recorded Music NZ)	8
Norway (VG-lista)	20
Philippines Hot 100 (Billboard Philippines)	77
Poland (Polish Streaming Top 100)	8
Portugal (AFP)	8
Romania Airplay (TopHit)	76
Russia Streaming (TopHit)	44
Singapore Streaming (RIAS)	21
Slovakia Singles Digital (ČNS IFPI)	7
Slovenia Airplay (SloTop50)	26
Spain (Promusicae)	70
Sweden (Sverigetopplistan)	19
Switzerland (Schweizer Hitparade)	4
United Arab Emirates Streaming (IFPI)	19
UK Singles (Official Charts)	12
US Billboard Hot 100	7
US Holiday 100 (Billboard)	6
US Rolling Stone Top 100	7

=== Monthly charts ===
Monthly chart performance
Chart (2025)	Peak position
Moldova Airplay (TopHit)	94

=== Year-end charts ===
2023 year-end chart performance for "Let It Snow! Let It Snow! Let It Snow!" by Dean Martin
Chart (2023)	Position
Hungary (Single Top 40)	58

2024 year-end chart performance for "Let It Snow! Let It Snow! Let It Snow!" by Dean Martin
Chart (2024)	Position
Austria (Ö3 Austria Top 40)	64
Germany (GfK)	94

2025 year-end chart performance for "Let It Snow! Let It Snow! Let It Snow!" by Dean Martin
Chart (2025)	Position
Germany (GfK)	93
Switzerland (Schweizer Hitparade)	96

=== Certifications ===
Certifications for "Let It Snow! Let It Snow! Let It Snow!" by Dean Martin
Region	Certification	Certified units/sales
Australia (ARIA)	Platinum	70,000^{‡}
Denmark (IFPI Danmark)	2× Platinum	180,000^{‡}
Germany (BVMI)	Platinum	600,000^{‡}
Italy (FIMI)	Platinum	100,000^{‡}
New Zealand (RMNZ)	Platinum	30,000^{‡}
Portugal (AFP)	Platinum	10,000^{‡}
Spain (Promusicae)	Gold	30,000^{‡}
United Kingdom (BPI)	3× Platinum	1,800,000^{‡}
United States (RIAA)	2× Platinum	2,000,000^{‡}
Streaming
Greece (IFPI Greece)	Platinum	2,000,000^{†}
^{‡} Sales+streaming figures based on certification alone.^{†} Streaming-only figures based on certification alone.

== Lena Horne version ==
"Let It Snow! Let It Snow! Let It Snow!"

Single by Lena Horne

from the album Merry from Lena
- Released: 1966
- Genre: Vocal jazz; Christmas
- Length: 2:33
- Label: United Artists
- Songwriters: Jule Styne; Sammy Cahn
- Producer: Ray Ellis

Lena Horne recorded her version of "Let It Snow! Let It Snow! Let It Snow!" for her 1966 holiday album, Merry from Lena. It has remained popular since, notably appearing on Christmas soundtracks such as the 2003 film Elf.

== Jessica Simpson version ==
"Let It Snow! Let It Snow! Let It Snow!"

Single by Jessica Simpson

from the album Rejoyce: The Christmas Album
- Released: November 22, 2004
- Recorded: 2004
- Studio: Turtle Sound Studios (New York, NY); Headman Recording (New York, NY); Pyramid Studios (New York, NY); House of Blues Studios (Los Angeles, CA)
- Genre: Christmas; traditional pop
- Length: 2:01
- Label: Columbia
- Composers: Sammy Cahn, Jule Styne
- Lyricist: Sammy Cahn

American singer Jessica Simpson released a version of the song in 2004, as part of her album Rejoyce: The Christmas Album. Her version was produced by Billy Mann and reached Number 20 on the Billboard Adult Contemporary chart.

Chart performance for "Let It Snow! Let It Snow! Let It Snow!" by Jessica Simpson
Chart (2004)	Peak position
US Billboard AC	20

== Other charting recordings ==
=== Glee Cast version ===
Chart performance for "Let It Snow" by the Glee cast
Chart (2011–2012)	Peak position
US Holiday Digital Song Sales (Billboard)	22

=== Michael Bublé version ===
Chart performance for "Let It Snow" by Michael Bublé
Chart (2021–2022)	Peak position
Ireland (IRMA)	61
UK Singles (Official Charts)	44
US Adult Contemporary (Billboard)	1

=== Pentatonix version ===
Chart performance for "Let It Snow! Let It Snow! Let It Snow!" by Pentatonix
Chart (2017–2018)	Peak position
US Adult Contemporary (Billboard)	17
US Holiday Digital Song Sales (Billboard)	5

== Other notable versions ==
Widely heard recordings of the song include:

- 1945 (first recording) – Vaughn Monroe for RCA Victor, which became a popular hit, reaching No. 1 on the Billboard "Best Sellers" music chart for five weeks from late December into early 1946. Vaughn later re-recorded the song in stereo for his 1958 RCA Victor album There I Sing/Swing It Again, and once again for his 1962 Dot Records album His Greatest Hits.
- 1946 – Woody Herman for Columbia Records, which reached No. 8 on the Billboard chart. Other 1946 versions were recorded by Connee Boswell for Decca Records and Bob Crosby for ARA Records.
- 1962 – Bing Crosby, on his album I Wish You a Merry Christmas.
- 2005 – Carly Simon, on a CD single. It peaked at No. 6 on the Billboard Adult Contemporary chart.
- 2012 – Rod Stewart, on his album Merry Christmas, Baby. Stewart's version reached No. 1 on Billboard's Adult Contemporary chart in December 2012 and remained there for a total of five weeks, tying it for the longest leading rendition of a holiday title in the history of the chart.
- 2013 – Dove Cameron recorded the song for the Christmas album Disney Holidays Unwrapped.
- 2019 – Doris Day recorded the song for her Christmas album The Doris Day Christmas Album in 1964. Her version is unusual as she sings as the host in a breathy seductive tone with sighs; all in a slow tempo, with The Royal Philharmonic Orchestra remixing the version in 2019.

== See also ==
- List of Billboard Adult Contemporary number ones of 2012
- List of Billboard Adult Contemporary number ones of 2021
