= Rose Room =

Jazz standard made by Art Hickman & Harry Williams

Single by Art Hickman and His Orchestra
- A-side: "Cairo"
- Published: 1917
- Released: March 1920
- Recorded: September 19, 1919
- Genre: Jazz
- Label: Columbia
- Composer: Art Hickman
- Lyricist: Harry Williams

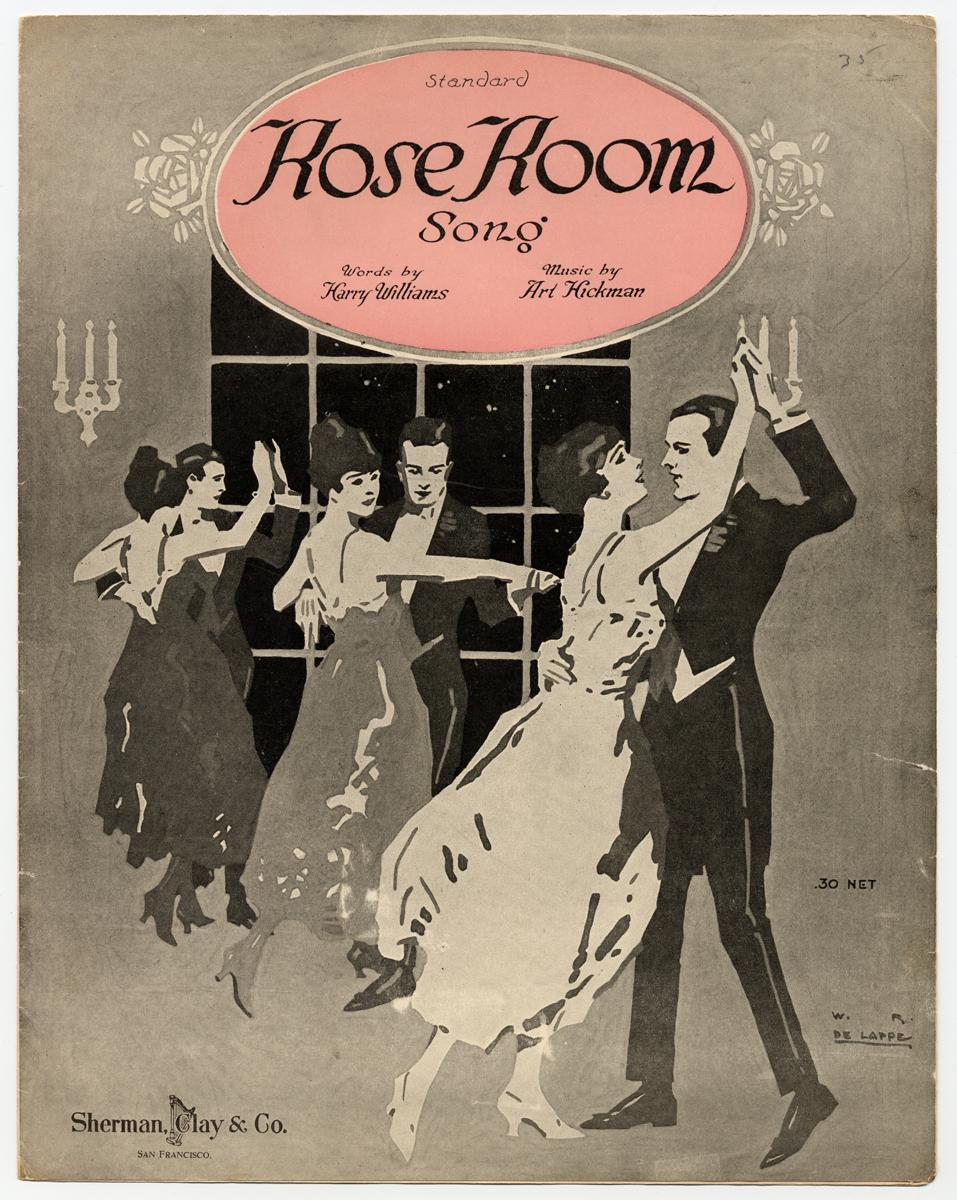
1918 sheet music cover

Art Hickman's Orchestra playing "Rose Room" c.1919.

"Rose Room", also known as "In Sunny Roseland", is a 1917 jazz standard, music by Art Hickman, lyrics by Harry Williams. It is almost always performed as an instrumental. Composed at a time when the popularity of ragtime was fading in favor of thirty-two-bar form and twelve-bar blues songs, the song has been called "definitely ahead of its time" by composer Alec Wilder. Indeed, while popular in the late 1910s and early 1920s, the song enjoyed its biggest popularity during the swing era. The song was named after the Rose Room in St. Francis Hotel, where Hickman was playing at the time. In 1914, jazz pioneer Bert Kelly was a member of Hickman's band.

== History ==
Duke Ellington is credited in reviving the popularity of "Rose Room" with his 1932 recording. Ellington later used the song's chord progression in his 1939 composition, "In a Mellotone". "Rose Room" is also the song with which Charlie Christian impressed Benny Goodman in 1939, jamming it solo after solo for 45 minutes with Goodman's band. The October 2, 1939, recording of the song by Benny Goodman and Charlie Christian was inducted into the National Recording Registry by the Library of Congress in 2024.

It was sung by Betty Hutton in the 1952 film Somebody Loves Me, which is loosely based on the life of Blossom Seely, of which Rose Room was one of her signature songs.

Modern Swing Group, Leader: John Kongshaug recorded a version in Oslo on December 6, 1954. It was released on the 78 rpm record His Master's Voice A.L. 3489.

Bandleader Phil Harris used "Rose Room" as his theme song while performing in San Francisco. He also used "Rose Room" again as a second theme on his NBC radio series, The Phil Harris-Alice Faye Show. The Lawrence Welk Orchestra/Show made a rendition with "Peanuts" Hucko on clarinet, in a show paying tribute to roses.

== In popular culture ==
- The tune plays over the closing credits of "Away with the Fairies" (2012), an episode from the first season of Miss Fisher's Murder Mysteries.

== See also ==
- List of pre-1920 jazz standards
