= Betty Hutton =

American actress (1921–2007)

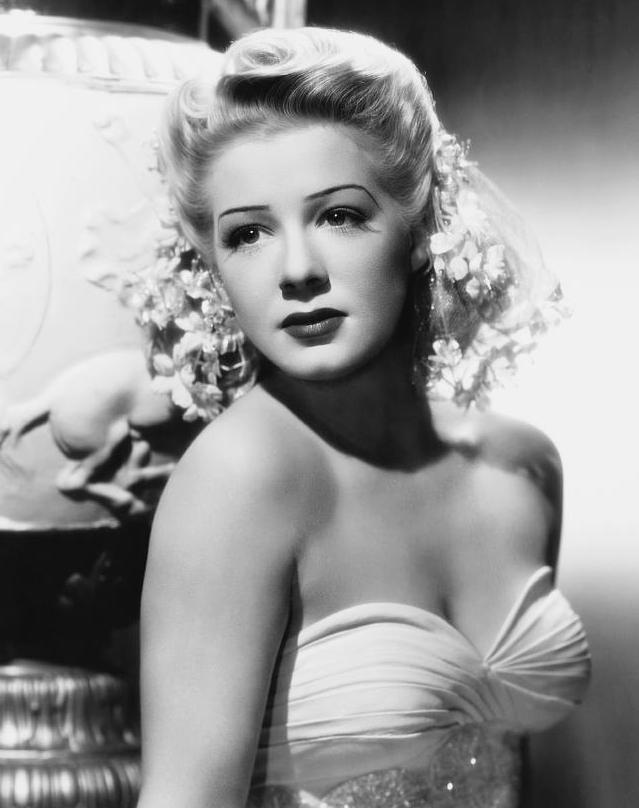
- Hutton c. 1945
- Born: Elizabeth June Thornburg; February 26, 1921; Battle Creek, Michigan, U.S.
- Died: March 12, 2007 (aged 86); Palm Springs, California, U.S.
- Resting place: Desert Memorial Park
- Education: Salve Regina University (B.A; M.A.)
- Occupations: Actress; comedian; singer; dancer
- Years active: 1938–1983
- Spouses: Ted Briskin (m. 1945; div. 1951) Charles O'Curran (m. 1952; div. 1955) Alan W. Livingston (m. 1955; div. 1960) Pete Candoli (m. 1960; div. 1967)
- Children: 3
- Relatives: Marion Hutton (sister)
- Awards: Hollywood Walk of Fame

Betty Hutton (born Elizabeth June Thornburg; February 26, 1921 – March 12, 2007) (Note: Information about the date of Hutton's death has conflicts.: Her gravestone says March 12, which is also given in the Social Security Death Index and in a list provided by the cemetery.; The New York Times obituary, published on March 14 (Wednesday), says she died "Sunday night", which was March 11.; The AP obituary does not have a clear death date: "The death was confirmed Monday by a friend of Hutton, who spoke only on condition of anonymity, citing her wishes that her death be announced at a specified time by the executor of her estate, Carl Bruno."; The Guardian obituary was first published with March 12 as the death date, which was then changed to the 11th a week later, per the note at the bottom.) was an American stage, film, and television actress, comedian, dancer, and singer. With a career spanning six decades, she rose to fame in the 1940s as a contract player for Paramount Pictures, appearing primarily in musicals and becoming one of the studio's most valuable stars. She was noted for her energetic performance style.

Raised in Detroit during the Great Depression by a single mother who worked as a bootlegger, Hutton began performing as a singer from a young age, entertaining patrons of her mother's speakeasy. While performing in local nightclubs, she was discovered by orchestra leader Vincent Lopez, who hired her as a singer in his band.

In 1940, Hutton was cast in the Broadway productions Two for the Show and Panama Hattie, and attracted notice for her raucous and animated live performances. She relocated to Los Angeles in 1941 after being signed by Paramount Pictures, and concurrently recorded numerous singles for Capitol Records. Her breakthrough role came in Preston Sturges's The Miracle of Morgan's Creek (1943), and she went on to receive further notice for her lead role as Annie Oakley in the musical Annie Get Your Gun (1950), and for Cecil B. DeMille's epic The Greatest Show on Earth (1952). She made her final feature film appearance in Spring Reunion (1956).

After leaving Paramount, Hutton starred in her own series, The Betty Hutton Show, from 1959 until 1960. She continued to perform in stage productions, though her career faltered following a series of personal struggles, including chronic depression, alcoholism, and prescription drug addiction. Hutton largely abandoned her performing career by the 1970s and found employment in a Rhode Island rectory after becoming nearly destitute. She returned to the stage temporarily, replacing Alice Ghostley in the original Broadway production of Annie in 1980.

In her later life, Hutton attended Salve Regina University, where she earned a master's degree in psychology in 1986. After working as an acting instructor at Emerson College, Hutton returned to California in 1999 and resided in Palm Springs, where she died in 2007 at 86.

== Early life ==
Hutton was born Elizabeth June Thornburg on February 26, 1921, in Battle Creek, Michigan, the youngest of two daughters of Percy Thornburg, a railroad brakeman, and Mabel Thornburg (née Lum). When she was two years old, her father abandoned the family. They did not hear of him again until they received a telegram years later, informing them of his suicide. Betty and her older sister, Marion, were raised by their single mother, who was an alcoholic.

Hutton's formative years during the Great Depression were marked by poverty, with Hutton's mother supporting herself and her two children by working as an automobile upholsterer and running an illegal speakeasy out of her home in Lansing, Michigan. There, Hutton and her sister regularly performed songs to entertain customers of the speakeasy.

Due to her mother's bootlegging of alcohol during prohibition, the family relocated frequently to evade police, eventually settling in Detroit when she was eight years old. Recalling her childhood, Hutton said: "Mom just ran a joint on a small scale. We'd operate until the cops got wise. Then they'd move in and close us down, and we'd move somewhere else. Marion and I would entertain the customers by dancing and singing. We really lived that way until we were 12 and 14 years old... Things were really tough. At one time we were down to one can of beans."

Hutton attended Foch Intermediate School in Detroit before dropping out in ninth grade. She sang in several local bands as a teenager and at 15 attempted to find stage work in New York City; her efforts proved unsuccessful, and she returned to Detroit.

== Career ==
=== 1938–1940: Music and Broadway ===
In 1938, Hutton was discovered by orchestra leader Vincent Lopez while she was performing as a singer in local Detroit nightclubs. Lopez recruited her as a member of his band, and she began touring with them as a singer, billed as Betty Jane. During her tenure with the band, Hutton established a distinctive "whoop and holler" vocal style. Lopez, an adherent of numerology, used his numerology practice to rebrand her with the stage name Betty Hutton: "I tried to get a vibration that would make her a lot of money. It was a five-eight vibration. After that she did fine." Through her work with Lopez, Hutton was hired to appear in several musical shorts for Warner Bros.: Queens of the Air (1938), Three Kings and a Queen (1939), Public Jitterbug No. 1 (1939), and One for the Book (1940).

In 1940, Hutton was cast in the Broadway production Two for the Show, which ran for 124 performances and received rave reviews. Hutton soon became known for her raucous performances onstage, summarized in a 1950 Time magazine article:

During the show's run, hardworking, hard-cussing actress Hutton spared her fellow performers no more than she spared herself. She thrashed about so violently that once she catapulted off the stage and onto a drummer in the orchestra pit. In a number that required her to maul Keenan Wynn, she once toed him into a dead faint, forced him to take to protective padding. Among her later victims: Bob Hope, whose teeth caps she sent scattering over a soundstage floor during a bit of jujitsu; Cinemactor Frank Faylen, whom she knocked out with a right to the jaw when the director demanded realism; Eddie Bracken, who, in a saloon scene, caught a Hutton slap on the back that looped him over the bar and into a heap on the other side. "When they work with me," crows Betty, "they gotta get insurance policies."

Two for the Show was produced by Buddy DeSylva, who then cast Hutton in Panama Hattie (1940–1942). This was a major hit, running for 501 performances. It starred Ethel Merman; despite rumors through the years that Merman demanded from envy that Hutton's musical numbers be reduced from the show, more careful reports demonstrate that producer DeSylva chose to cut just one song of three, "They Ain't Done Right by Our Nell", due to Hutton's "always in overdrive" performance style.

=== 1941–1949: Paramount contract and breakthrough ===
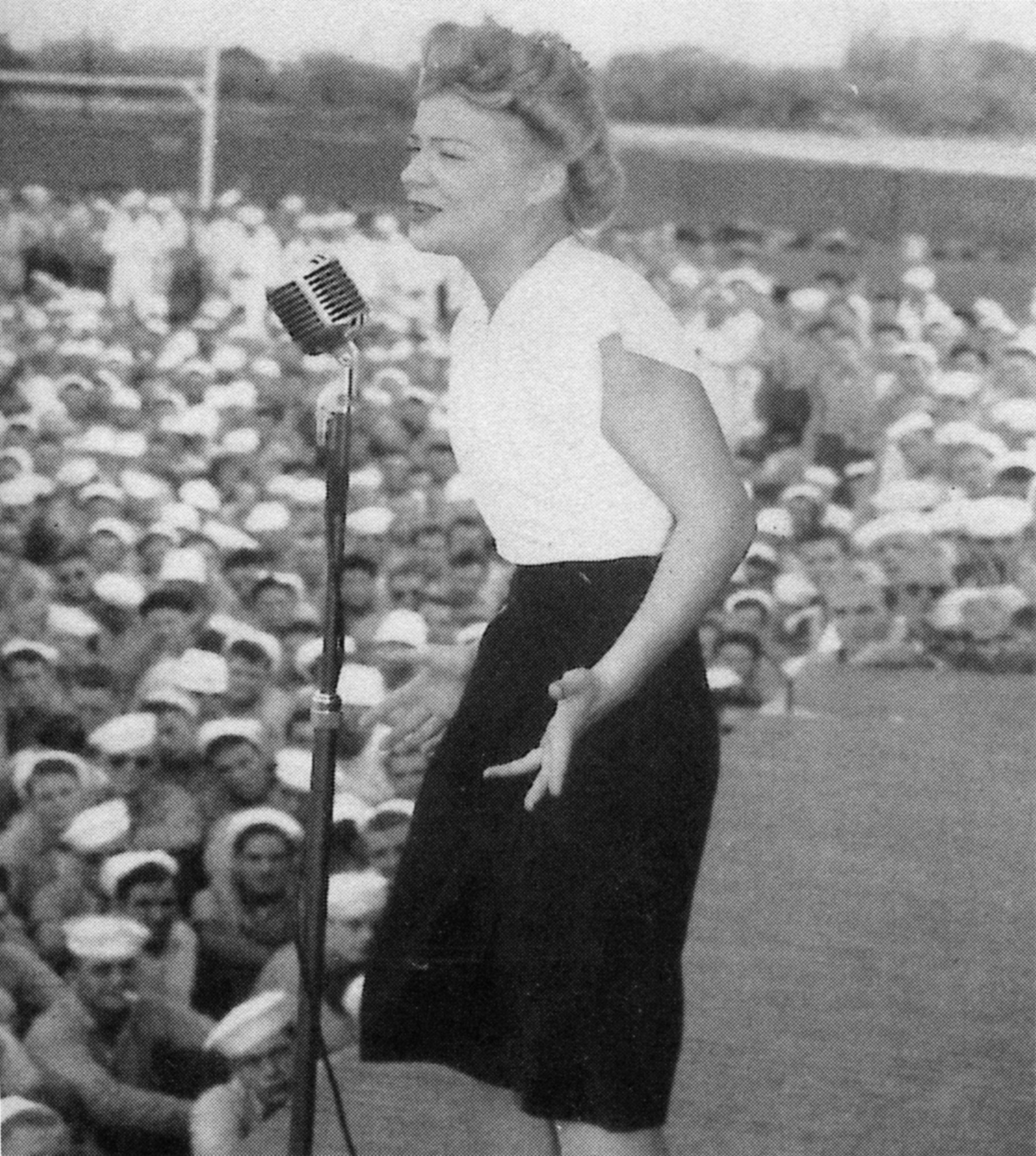
Betty Hutton performing for sailors at Naval Air Station Kaneohe, Oahu, Hawaii, 1945

When DeSylva became a producer at Paramount Pictures, he offered Hutton a contract with the studio, and she relocated to Los Angeles. She was first cast in a featured role in The Fleet's In (1942), starring Paramount's number-one female star Dorothy Lamour, alongside Eddie Bracken and William Holden. The film was popular and Hutton was an instant hit with the moviegoing public.

Hutton was one of the many Paramount contract artists who appeared in Star Spangled Rhythm (1942). The same year, she was signed to Capitol Records and recorded several singles over the following years, marking one of the label's earliest recording artists. Meanwhile, Paramount did not immediately promote her to major stardom, but gave the second lead in a Mary Martin film musical, Happy Go Lucky (1943). The response was positive, and Hutton was given co-star billing with Bob Hope in Let's Face It (1943). During that year, she made $1250 per week.

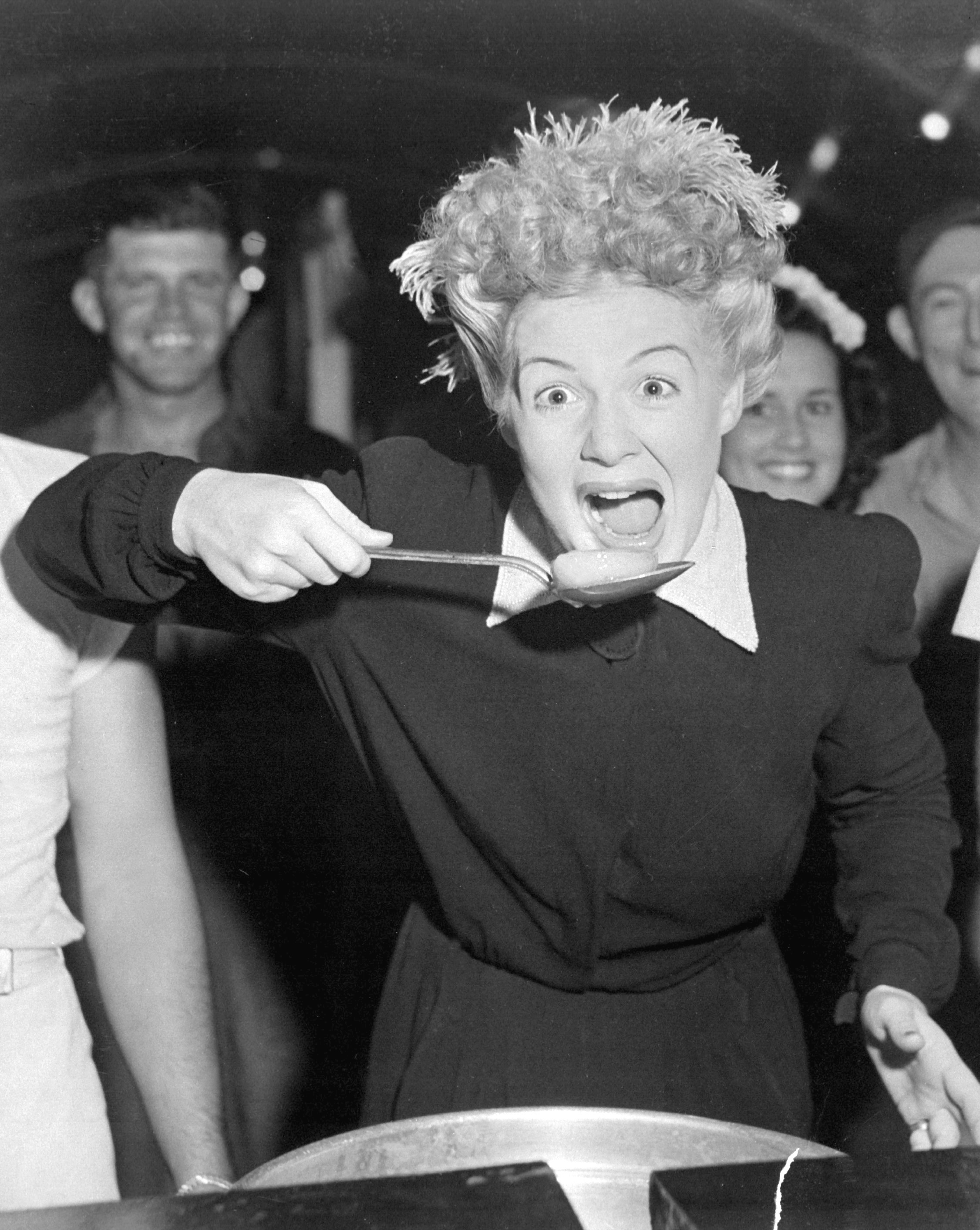
With American sailors and marines in the Marshall Islands, December 1944

In 1942, writer-director Preston Sturges cast Hutton in The Miracle of Morgan's Creek as a small-town girl who gives local troops a happy send-off and wakes up married and pregnant, but with no memory of who her husband is. The film was delayed by Hays Office objections and Sturges' prolific output. The film was released in the United Kingdom in December, 1943, before being finally released in the United States in January, 1944. The film made Hutton a major star; Sturges was nominated for a Best Writing Oscar, the film was named to the National Film Board's Top Ten films for the year, and the National Board of Review nominated the film for Best Picture of 1944, and awarded Betty Hutton the award for Best Acting for her performance. The New York Times named it as one of the 10 Best Films of 1942–1944.

Critic James Agee noted that "the Hays office must have been raped in its sleep" to allow the film to be released. And although the Hays Office received many letters protesting the film's subject matter, it was Paramount's highest-grossing film of 1944, playing to standing room-only audiences in some theatres.

Hutton was next cast in Paramount's And the Angels Sing (1944) with Fred MacMurray and Dorothy Lamour, and Here Come the Waves (1944) with Bing Crosby. Both were huge hits. DeSylva, one of Capitol's founders, also co-produced her next hit, the musical Incendiary Blonde (1945), where she played Texas Guinan. It was directed by veteran comedy director George Marshall, and Hutton had replaced Lamour as Paramount's top female box-office attraction. Hutton was one of many Paramount stars in Duffy's Tavern (1945), and was top billed in The Stork Club (1945) with Barry Fitzgerald, produced by DeSylva. Hutton went into Cross My Heart (1946) with Sonny Tufts, which she disliked. She did however enjoy the popular The Perils of Pauline (1947), directed by Marshall, where she sang a Frank Loesser song that was nominated for an Oscar: "I Wish I Didn't Love You So". The recording sold over a million copies worldwide, and reached number six in the U.S. charts.

Hutton's relationship with Paramount began to disintegrate when DeSylva left the studio due to illness (he died in 1950). "After he left I started doing scripts that I knew weren't good for me."

The film Romance on the High Seas (1948) directed by Michael Curtiz, was originally intended to be a musical vehicle for Hutton, but Hutton was pregnant with her second child at the time and was unavailable. Instead, Curtiz cast Doris Day in her feature film debut.

Hutton starred in Dream Girl (1948) with MacDonald Carey. Directed by Mitchell Leisen, it is based on the popular Broadway play of the same name by Elmer Rice. A drama, it was her second non-musical film. Hutton said Dream Girl, "almost ruined me."

She did Red, Hot and Blue (1949) with Victor Mature, which she also disliked.

=== 1950–1958: Annie Get Your Gun, The Greatest Show on Earth & film career decline ===
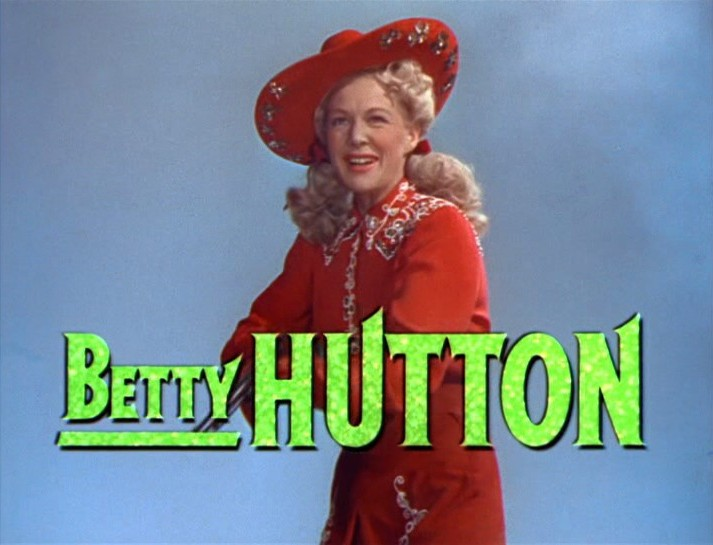
Trailer for Annie Get Your Gun (1950)

Hutton starred in the 1950 movie adaption of the 1946 Irving Berlin musical, Annie Get Your Gun, for Metro-Goldwyn-Mayer. Judy Garland, MGM's top female musical attraction, was originally cast in the leading role of Annie Oakley. One month into filming, Garland was fired for tardiness. Production on the film came to a halt in May, 1949, as a replacement actress was required. Hutton, Paramount's top female musical attraction, lobbied hard for the role with both MGM and Paramount. An agreement between the studios was reached through a $100,000 loan out deal, with MGM given the option to use Hutton in two more films. Hutton claims that the cast and crew of Annie Get Your Gun treated her poorly and that MGM did not invite her to the film's premiere. Annie Get Your Gun was a box office success and was one of the highest grossing films of 1950.

Hutton was top billed in the 1950 technicolor musical Let's Dance, in which she starred with Fred Astaire.

Hutton in 1952

She was one of several stars in The Greatest Show on Earth (1952), an epic drama directed by Cecil B. DeMille about performers in a circus which won two Academy Awards: Best Picture and Best Story. Hutton portrayed a trapeze artist in the film, and trained extensively for the role for six months, allowing her to perform many of her own stunts. She made an unbilled cameo in Sailor Beware (1952) with Dean Martin and Jerry Lewis, a remake of The Fleet's In, in which she portrayed Dean's girlfriend, Hetty Button.

She starred in Somebody Loves Me (1952), a biography of singers and vaudevillans Blossom Seeley & Benny Fields with Ralph Meeker. During filming, Hutton had vocal surgery to have a wart removed in her throat. She extensively trained her voice to fit Seeley's lower pitch.

Hutton then clashed with Paramount. The New York Times reported that the dispute resulted from her insistence that her husband at the time, choreographer Charles O'Curran, direct her in a film.

In April 1952, Hutton returned to Broadway, performing in Betty Hutton and Her All-Star International Show. In July 1952, she announced that she and her husband would form a production company. She left Paramount in August.

In January 1953, Variety named her the second highest-grossing female star of 1952, behind Elizabeth Taylor, and fifth highest-grossing overall with a total gross of $14,200,000.

Hutton then transitioned to radio work and appeared in Las Vegas, where she had success performing in live theater productions. She had the rights to a screenplay about Sophie Tucker, but was unable to raise funds. In 1954, TV producer Max Liebman, of comedian Sid Caesar's Your Show of Shows, fashioned his first "Color Spectacular" as an original musical written especially for Hutton, Satins and Spurs. Hutton's last completed film was a small one, Spring Reunion (1956). It was a financial disappointment. She also became disillusioned with Capitol's management and moved to RCA Victor. In 1957, she appeared on a Dinah Shore show on NBC that also featured Boris Karloff; the program has been preserved on a kinescope.

=== 1959–1964: Television work ===
Lucille Ball and Desi Arnaz took a chance on Hutton in 1959, with their company Desilu Productions giving her a CBS sitcom, The Betty Hutton Show. Hutton hired the still-blacklisted and future film composer Jerry Fielding to direct her series. They had met over the years in Las Vegas when he was blacklisted from TV and radio and could get no other work, and her Hollywood career was also fading. It was Fielding's first network job since losing his post as musical director of Groucho Marx's You Bet Your Life in 1953 after hostile questioning by the House UnAmerican Activities Committee. The Betty Hutton Show ended after 30 episodes.

Hutton continued headlining in Las Vegas and touring across the country. She returned to Broadway briefly in 1964 when she temporarily replaced a hospitalized Carol Burnett in the show Fade Out – Fade In. She guest-starred on shows such as The Greatest Show on Earth, Burke's Law, and Gunsmoke.

=== 1965–1979: Personal and financial struggles ===
By the early 1960s, Hutton's career had declined significantly, attributed to her chronic depression and addiction to alcohol and prescription drugs. Turner Classic Movies described her career downswing as "one of the grimmest declines in Hollywood history." Following the 1962 death of her mother in a house fire, and the collapse of her last marriage, Hutton's depression and substance abuse escalated. She divorced her fourth husband, jazz trumpeter Pete Candoli, when she discovered he had fallen in love with Edie Adams (who would become Candoli's second wife), and attempted suicide, causing her to lose custody of her youngest daughter, Carolyn, then sixteen years old. She declared bankruptcy the same year.

In 1967, she was signed to make a comeback starring in two low-budget Westerns for Paramount, but was fired shortly after the projects began. After losing her singing voice in 1970, Hutton had a nervous breakdown and again attempted suicide. She regained control of her life through rehabilitation and the mentorship of a Catholic priest, Father Peter Maguire. Hutton converted to Catholicism and took a job as a cook and housekeeper at a rectory in Portsmouth, Rhode Island. She made national headlines when it was revealed she was practically penniless and working in a rectory. Speaking on her conversion to Catholicism, Hutton stated that she had been fascinated by the religion since childhood, though she was raised irreligious by her mother, who was an atheist.

After an aborted comeback in 1974, she was hospitalized with emotional exhaustion.

Hutton appeared in an interview with Mike Douglas and made a brief guest appearance in 1975 on Baretta. In September 1978, Hutton was featured on The Phil Donahue Show, where she discussed her life and career. She was then happily employed as hostess at a Newport, Rhode Island, jai alai arena.

She also appeared on Good Morning America, which led to a 1978 televised reunion with her two daughters. Hutton began living in a shared home with her divorced daughter and grandchildren in California, but returned to the East Coast for a three-week return to the stage.

=== 1980–1983: Return to Broadway and academic endeavors ===
In 1980, she took over the role of Miss Hannigan during the original Broadway production of Annie while Alice Ghostley was on vacation. Ghostley replaced the original Miss Hannigan actress, Dorothy Loudon (who won a Tony Award for the role).

Hutton's rehearsal of the song "Little Girls" was featured on Good Morning America. Her Broadway comeback was also included in a profile on CBS News Sunday Morning about her life, her struggle with pills, and her recovery.

A ninth-grade dropout, Hutton went back to school and earned a master's degree in psychology from Salve Regina University in 1986. During her time at the university, Hutton became friends with fellow student and singer-songwriter Kristin Hersh, and attended several early concerts of Hersh's band, Throwing Muses. Hersh later wrote the song "Elizabeth June" as a tribute to Hutton, and wrote about their relationship in further detail in her memoir, Rat Girl (2010).

After completing her master's degree, Hutton worked as a drama instructor at Emerson College in Boston, Massachusetts.

Hutton's last known performance, in any medium, was on Jukebox Saturday Night, which aired on PBS in 1983. She became estranged again from her daughters.

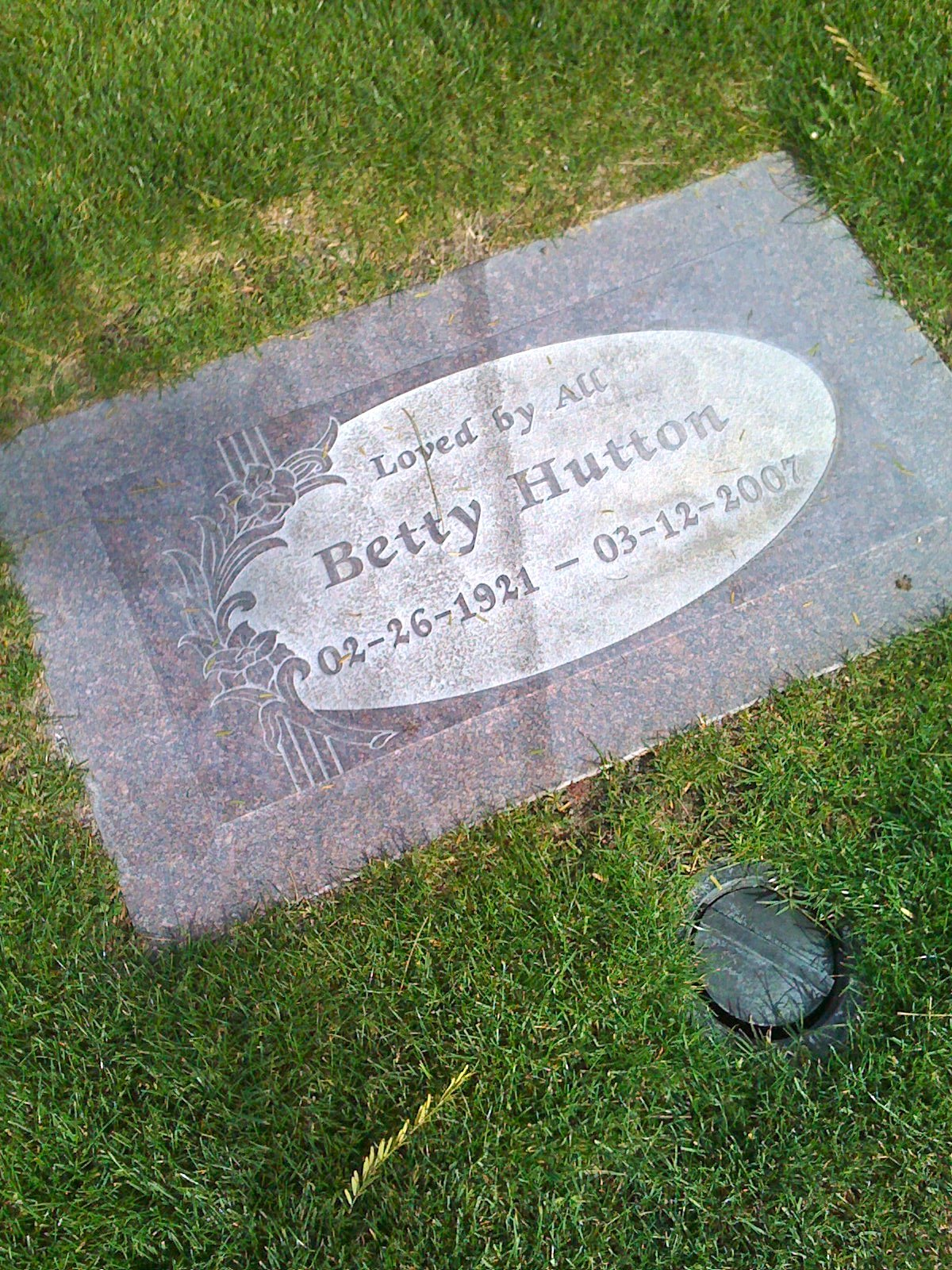
Hutton's headstone with epitaph "Loved by All", Desert Memorial Park, Cathedral City, California

== Personal life ==
=== Marriages and children ===
Hutton was once engaged to the head of the Warner Bros. makeup department, makeup artist Perc Westmore, in 1942, but broke off the engagement, saying it was because he bored her.

Her first marriage was to camera manufacturer Ted Briskin in September 1945. The couple met in a nightclub, and she described their meeting as "love at first sight." The couple had two daughters, Lindsay (b. 1946) and Candice (b. 1948), before their marriage ended in divorce in 1951.

Hutton's second marriage in 1952 was to choreographer Charles O'Curran. They divorced in 1955.

She married husband Alan W. Livingston in 1955, weeks after her divorce from O'Curran. They divorced in 1960.

Her fourth and final marriage in 1960 was to jazz trumpeter Pete Candoli. They divorced in 1967. Hutton and Candoli had one child, Carolyn (b. 1962).

=== Final years and death ===
After the death of her mentor, Father Maguire, Hutton returned to California, moving to Palm Springs in 1999, after decades in New England. Hutton hoped to grow closer to her daughters and grandchildren, as she told Robert Osborne on TCM's Private Screenings in April 2000, though her children remained distant. She told Osborne that she understood their hesitancy to accept a now elderly mother. The TCM interview first aired on July 18, 2000.

Hutton lived in Palm Springs until her death on March 12, 2007, at the age of 86 from complications of colon cancer. She is buried at Desert Memorial Park in Cathedral City, California.

== Legacy ==
For her contribution to the motion picture industry, Betty Hutton was awarded a star on the Hollywood Walk of Fame on 2 August 1960, which is located at 6259 Hollywood Boulevard. Hutton was posthumously awarded a star on the Palm Springs Walk of Stars on what would have been her 92nd birthday on February 26, 2013, which is located at 121 S. Palm Canyon Dr.

Hutton was one of 500 Hollywood stars nominated by the American Film Institute for the AFI's 100 Years...100 Stars as one of the greatest female stars.

=== Influence ===
Debbie Reynolds started her musical career lip syncing to Hutton's recording of the song "A Square in The Social Circle" written by Ray Evans. As a young girl, Skeeter Davis was inspired by Hutton and her music, with Davis citing Hutton as one of the people who sparked her love for music.

=== In popular culture ===
The song "Peggy The Pin Up Girl", written by Redd Evans and John Jacob Loeb, and most famously covered by Glenn Miller and his Orchestra, name-drops multiple female Hollywood stars, including Hutton. Hutton is name-dropped in the lyrics "Peggy's dancing caused a heat wave up in Nome / She has Betty Hutton's vigor / Lana Turner's classy figure."

Hutton's music has been used in popular media; her recording of "Hit The Road To Dreamland" written by Johnny Mercer & Harold Arlend features in the 1997 film L.A. Confidential.

Her music has also featured in the post-apocalyptic franchise Fallout, where her songs "It's a Man" and "He's a Demon, He's a Devil, He's a Doll" appeared in Fallout 4's in-game soundtrack. "It's a Man" also appeared in the 2024 Fallout episode "Target" along with "He's a Demon, He's a Devil, He's a Doll" which appears in the 2025 Fallout second season episode of "The Demon In The Snow".

== Hit songs ==
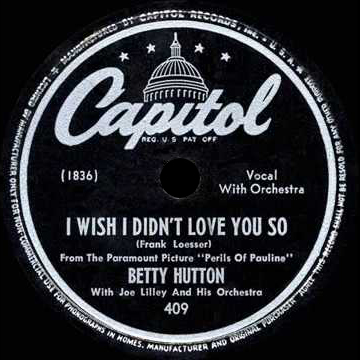
Introduced by Hutton in The Perils of Pauline (1947) and released on Capitol Records, "I Wish I Didn't Love You So" received an Academy Award nomination for Best Original Song

Year	Title	Chart peak	Catalog number	Notes
1939	"Old Man Mose"			with Vincent Lopez Orchestra
1939	"Igloo"	15	Bluebird 10300	with Vincent Lopez Orchestra
1939	"The Jitterbug"		Bluebird 10367	with Vincent Lopez Orchestra
1942	"Arthur Murray Taught Me Dancing in a Hurry"			
1942	"I'm Doin' It For Defense"			
1943	"Murder, He Says"			
1943	"The Fuddy Duddy Watchmaker"			
1944	"Bluebirds in my Belfry"			
1944	"It Had To Be You"	5	Capitol 155	with Paul Weston Orchestra
1944	"His Rocking Horse Ran Away"	7	Capitol 155	with Paul Weston Orchestra
1945	"Stuff Like That There"	4	Capitol 188	with Paul Weston Orchestra
1945	"What Do You Want to Make Those Eyes at Me For?"	15	Capitol 211	with Paul Weston Orchestra
1945	"(Doin' It) The Hard Way"		Capitol 211	with Paul Weston Orchestra
1945	"Doctor, Lawyer, Indian Chief"	1	Capitol 220	with Paul Weston Orchestra
1945	"A Square in the Social Circle"		Capitol 220	with Paul Weston Orchestra
1946	"My Fickle Eye"	21	RCA Victor 20-1915	with Joe Lilley Orchestra
1947	"Poppa, Don't Preach To Me"		Capitol 380	with Joe Lilley Orchestra
1947	"I Wish I Didn't Love You So"	5	Capitol 409	with Joe Lilley Orchestra
1949	"(Where Are You?) Now That I Need You"		Capitol 620	with Joe Lilley Orchestra
1950	"Orange Colored Sky"	24	RCA Victor 20-3908	with Pete Rugolo Orchestra
1950	"Can't Stop Talking"		RCA Victor 20-3908	with Pete Rugolo Orchestra
1950	"A Bushel and a Peck" (duet with Perry Como)	3	RCA Victor 20-3930	with Mitchell Ayres Orchestra
1951	"It's Oh So Quiet"		RCA Victor 20-4179	with Pete Rugolo Orchestra
1951	"The Musicians" (with Dinah Shore, Tony Martin and Phil Harris)	24	RCA Victor 20-4225	with Henri René Orchestra
1953	"Goin' Steady"	21	Capitol 2522	with Nelson Riddle Orchestra
1954	"The Honeymoon's Over" (duet with Tennessee Ernie Ford)	16	Capitol 2809	with Billy May Orchestra
1956	"Hit the Road to Dreamland"		Capitol 3383	with Vic Schoen Orchestra

== Filmography ==
Motion pictures
Year	Title	Role	Notes
1938	Queens of the Air	Herself	film short
1939	Vincent Lopez and His Orchestra	Herself	film short
1939	Three Kings and a Queen	Herself	film short
1939	Public Jitterbug No. 1	Herself	film short
1940	One for the Book	Cinderella	film short
1942	The Fleet's In	Bessie Dale	
1942	Star Spangled Rhythm	Polly Judson	
1943	Happy Go Lucky	Bubbles Hennessy	
1943	Let's Face It	Winnie Porter	
1943	Strictly G.I.	Herself	film short
1943	The Miracle of Morgan's Creek	Trudy Kockenlocker	
1944	And the Angels Sing	Bobby Angel	
1944	Skirmish on the Home Front	Emily Average	film short
1944	Here Come the Waves	Susan Allison / Rosemary Allison	
1945	Incendiary Blonde	Texas Guinan	
1945	Duffy's Tavern	Herself	cameo
1945	Hollywood Victory Caravan	Herself	film short
1945	The Stork Club	Judy Peabody	
1946	Cross My Heart	Peggy Harper	
1947	The Perils of Pauline	Pearl White	
1948	Dream Girl	Georgina Allerton	
1949	Red, Hot and Blue	Eleanor "Yum-Yum" Collier	
1950	Annie Get Your Gun	Annie Oakley	
1950	Let's Dance	Katherine "Kitty" McNeil	
1952	The Greatest Show on Earth	Holly	
1952	Sailor Beware	Hetty Button	cameo, Uncredited
1952	Somebody Loves Me	Blossom Seeley	
1956	Spring Reunion	Margaret "Maggie" Brewster	

Television
Year	Title	Role	Notes
1954	Satins and Spurs	Cindy Smathers	TV musical
1958	That's My Mom		1 episode (unaired pilot)
1959–1960	The Betty Hutton Show	Goldie Appleby	30 episodes
1964	The Greatest Show on Earth	Julia Dana	1 episode
1964–1965	Burke's Law	Carlene Glory; Rena Zito	2 episodes
1965	Gunsmoke	Molly McConnell	1 episode
1977	Baretta	Velma	1 episode (final appearance)

=== Box-office ranking ===
For several years, film exhibitors voted Hutton among the leading stars in the country:

- 1944 – 23rd (US)
- 1945 - 12th (US)
- 1950 – 15th (US)
- 1951 – 9th (UK)
- 1952 – 14th (US), 3rd (UK)

== Stage work ==
- Two for the Show (1940)
- Panama Hattie (1940)
- Betty Hutton and Her All-Star International Show (1952)
- Gypsy (1962)
- South Pacific (1962)
- Annie Get Your Gun (1963)
- Gentlemen Prefer Blondes (1964)
- Fade Out – Fade In (1964) (replacement for Carol Burnett)
- Mary, Mary (1965)
- Here Today (1966)
- Here Today (1972)
- Anything Goes (1973)
- Annie (1980) (replacement for Alice Ghostley)

== Radio appearances ==
Year	Program	Episode/source
April 12, 1942	Command Performance	with Gene Tierney - first show from Hollywood
June 2, 1942	Command Performance	with Mickey Rooney
February 6, 1943	Command Performance	with Rita Hayworth
October 2, 1943	Command Performance	with Don Ameche
November 13, 1943	Command Performance	with Bob Hope
May 29, 1948	Command Performance	with Bob Hope - sixth-anniversary special
February 6, 1950	Lux Radio Theatre	"Red, Hot And Blue"
1952	Stars in the Air	"Suddenly, It's Spring"
April 27, 1953	Lux Radio Theatre	"Somebody Loves Me"

== Awards and nominations ==
Year	Award	Category	Film	Result
1944	Golden Apple Awards	Most Cooperative Actress	—N/a	Won
1944	National Board of Review Awards	Best Acting	The Miracle of Morgan's Creek	Won
1950	Golden Globe Awards	Best Actress in a Motion Picture – Musical or Comedy	Annie Get Your Gun	Nominated
1950	Photoplay Awards	Most Popular Female Star	Annie Get Your Gun	Won
