= If I Had You (Ted Shapiro, Jimmy Campbell and Reg Connelly song) =

Song by Jimmy Campbell, Reg Connelly, and Ted Shapiro

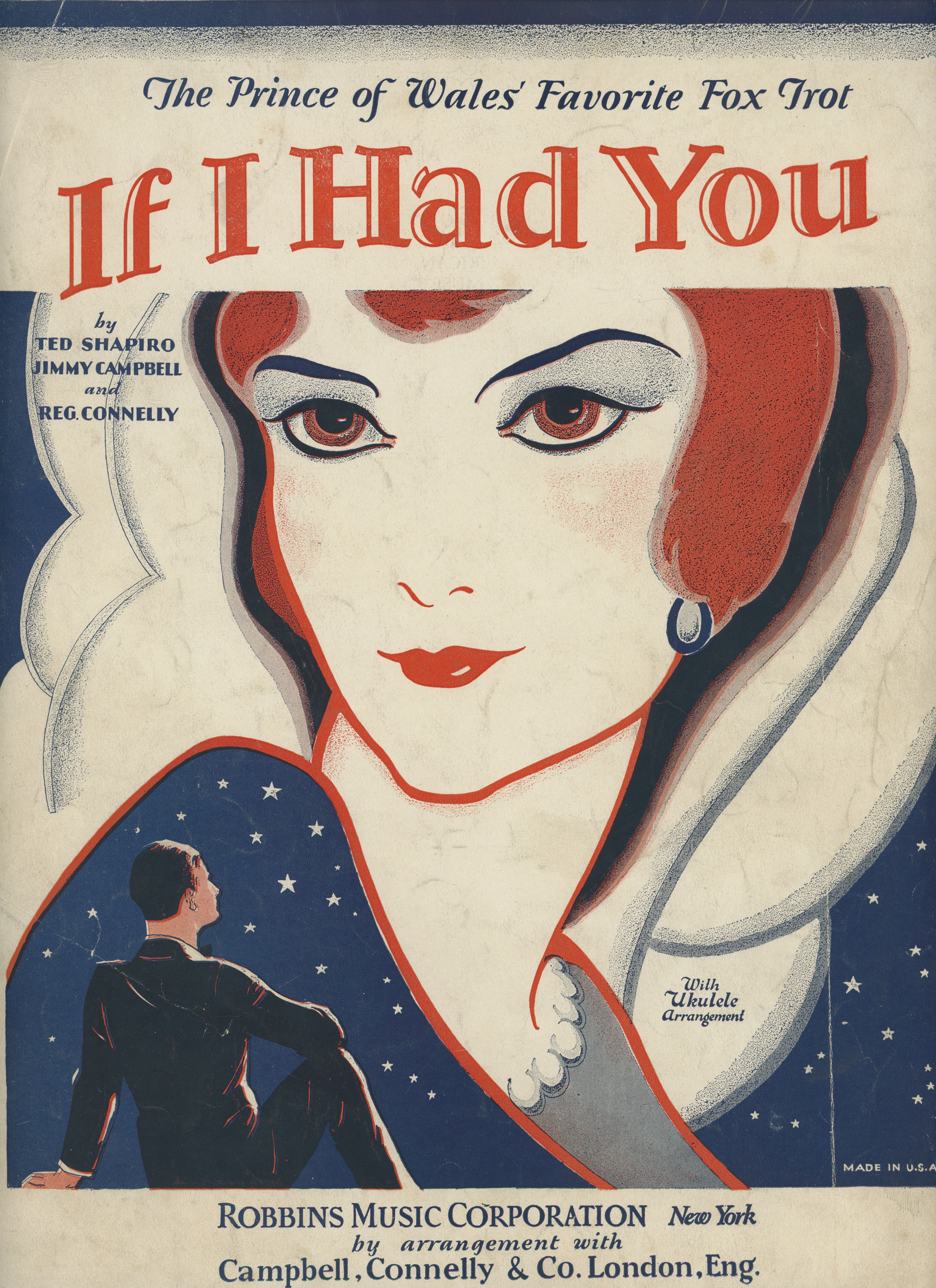
Sheet music cover

"If I Had You" is a 1928 song by "Irving King" (Jimmy Campbell and Reg Connelly) with Ted Shapiro. Early hit versions in 1929 were by Rudy Vallée and Al Bowlly.

Many other artists have recorded the song over the years, it became one of the "classic" jazz songs and many people enjoy it.

Notable covers

- Frank Sinatra included the song on his 1957 album A Swingin' Affair.
- Connie Francis included the song on her album Who's Sorry Now? (1958).
- Dean Martin included the song on his 1966 The Dean Martin TV Show and later another version of the song on the 1974 Once in a While (Dean Martin album) album.

Other covers

- Willie Nelson recorded the song as a duet with Diana Krall.
- The Platters also recorded the song.
- Benny Carter recorded the song as well.
- Jimmy Durante.Album (Way of Life)
- Billy May Orchestra. Album : " A Band is Born"
- Etta Jones Album: ( Don't go to Strangers )

== See also ==
- List of 1920s jazz standards
