= Harry Williams (songwriter) =

American songwriter (1879–1922)

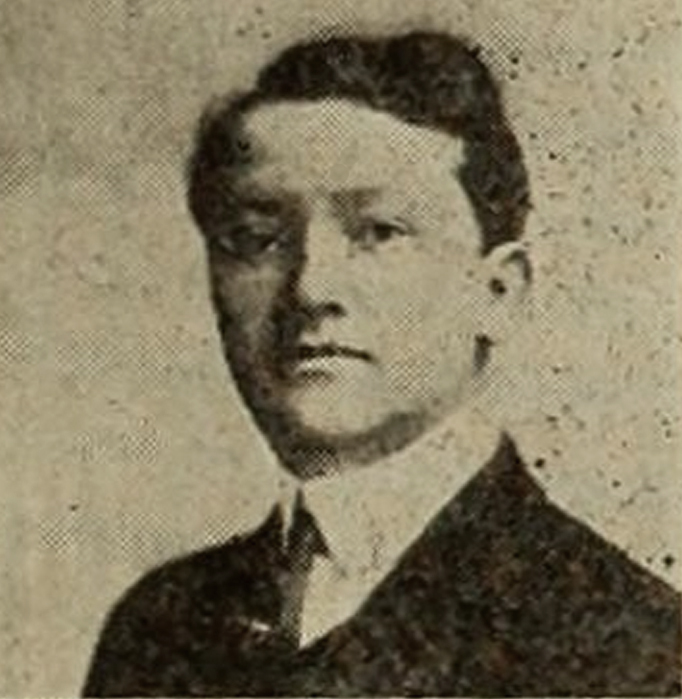
Williams circa 1915.

Harry Hiram Williams (August 23, 1879 – May 15, 1922) was an American composer, lyricist, and publisher of popular music from 1903 until his death in 1922.

One of his early hits, written in 1905 with Egbert Van Alstyne, is "In the Shade of the Old Apple Tree". With Aaron Hoffman he co-wrote the lyrics for Van Alstyne's musical Tom, Dick and Harry (1905). He also produced story ideas and directed silent movies with Mack Sennett for Keystone Studios, according to Sennett's biography The King of Comedy. Williams joined The Lambs Club in 1908.

In 1912 he wrote "It's a Long, Long Way to Tipperary", with music by Jack Judge, and in 1917 the lyrics to Art Hickman's "Rose Room", to which Fred Astaire and Ginger Rogers danced in the film The Story of Vernon and Irene Castle.
