= Art Hickman =

Musical artist (1886-1930)

Arthur George Hickman
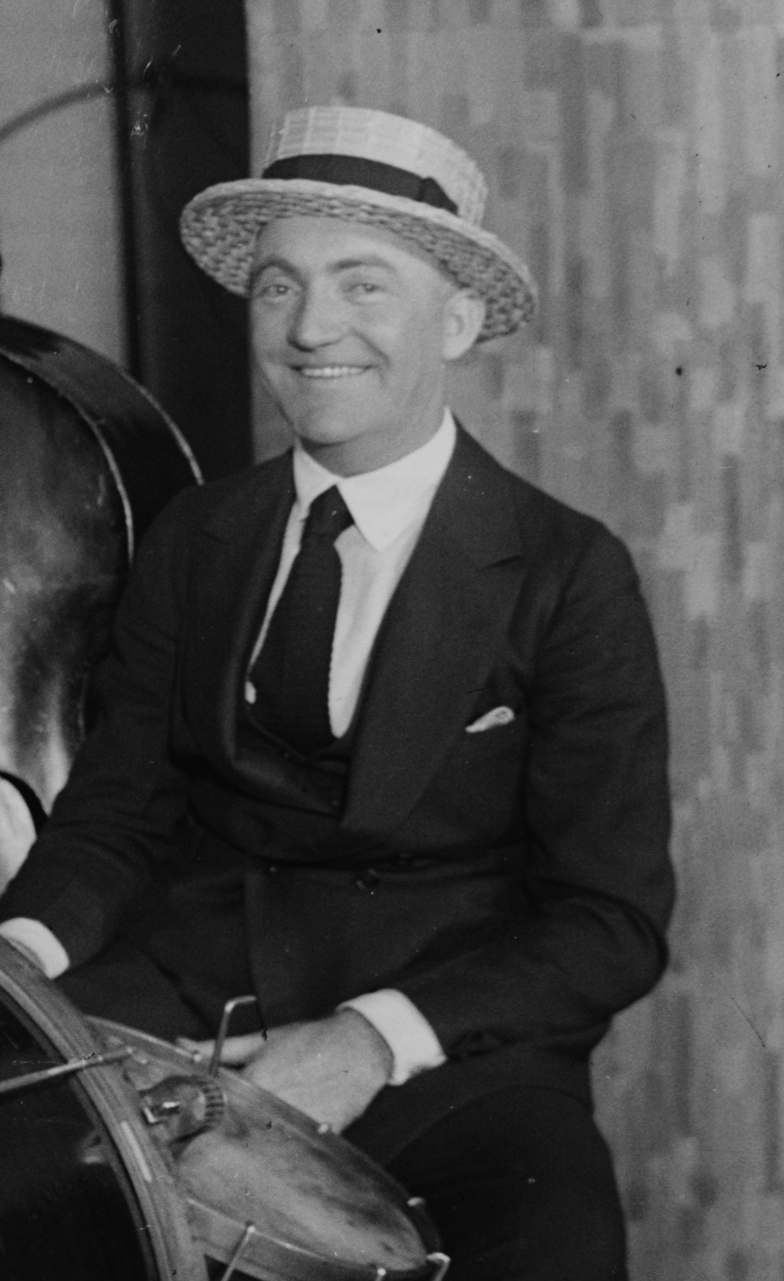
- Hickman c. 1919

Background information
- Born: June 13, 1886; Oakland, California, U.S.
- Died: January 16, 1930 (aged 43) San Francisco, California
- Genres: Jazz, big band
- Occupation: Musician
- Instruments: Piano, drums
- Years active: 1913–1920s
- Labels: Columbia, Victor

Arthur George Hickman (June 13, 1886 – January 16, 1930) was a drummer, pianist, and bandleader of one of the first big bands.

== Career ==
Hickman founded a sextet in San Francisco in 1913. The band's first job was playing at training camp for the baseball team the San Francisco Seals. Next it was hired to perform at the St. Francis Hotel. Popularity allowed Hickman to expand his sextet and hire Ben Black, Earl Burtnett, Fred Coffman, Clyde Doerr, Steve Douglas, Frank Ellis, Dick Noolan, Ed Fitzpatrick, Jess Fitzpatrick, Roy Fox, Ray Hoback, Vic King, Lou Marcasie, Hank Miller, Mark Moica, Bert Ralton, Juan Ramos, Forrest Ray, Walt Rosener, Bela Spiller, Dick Winfree.

In 1915, they performed at the world's fair in San Francisco. Four years later they were hired by Florenz Ziegfeld Jr. to play at his nightclub on the roof of the New Amsterdam Theatre in New York City. During the next year, they accompanied the Ziegfeld Follies. Hickman's orchestra went back to California and played again at the St. Francis Hotel and the Ambassador Hotel in Los Angeles. After Hickman retired, the band was led by Frank Ellis. Hickman's "Rose Room" became a big band standard.

== Influence ==
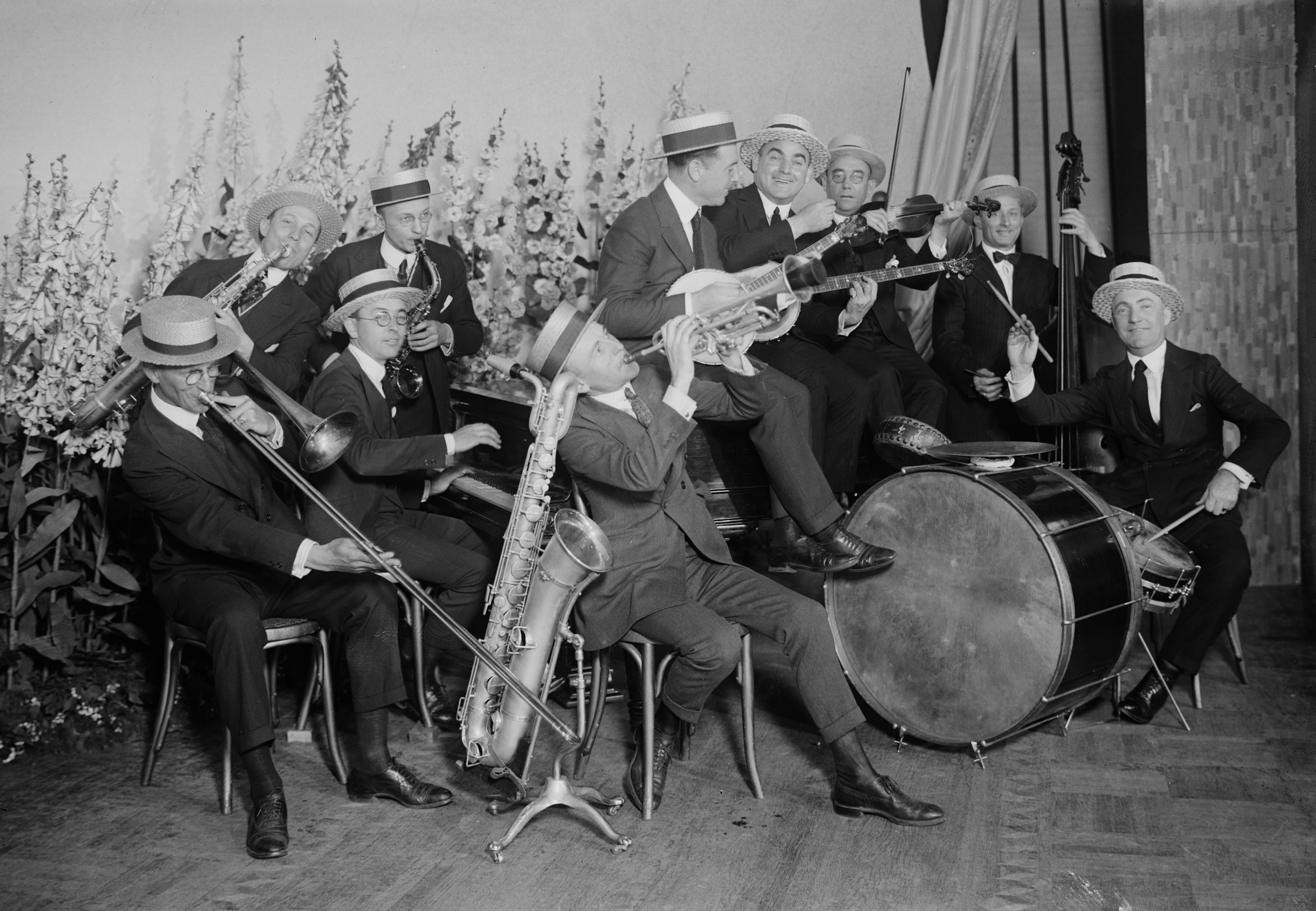
Art Hickman and His Orchestra, c. 1919

Before Paul Whiteman, Hickman's dance orchestra was one of the first to use elements of jazz and one of the first to use a saxophone section. The bands instruments also included violin, trumpet, trombone, reeds (2), banjo (2), double bass, and piano, with Hickman on second piano and drums.

The Japanese Sandman
The Japanese Sandman, performed by Art Hickman and His Orchestra on September 30th, 1920

In 2004, Archeophone Records released The San Francisco Sound, an album that contains nearly all of Hickman's recordings from Sept. 15, 1919 to July 8, 1920. Clyde Doerr plays alto and baritone saxophone. Bert Ralton plays soprano saxophone, tenor saxophone, oboe, and English horn.

== Death ==
For 3 years prior to his death in 1930, Arthur had been suffering from Benti's syndrome, a chronic enlargement to the spleen. On January 15th, 1930, he suffered a relapse, and had an operation planned for the next day. It failed, however, and even after 3 blood transfusions, Arthur Hickman died on January 16th, 1930, at the Saint Francis Hospital, in San Francisco, California.

== Discography ==
- The San Francisco Sound (Archeophone, 2004)
