= 1951 in country music =

This is a list of notable events in country music that took place in the year 1951.

== Top hits of the year ==
=== Number one hits ===
(As certified by Billboard magazine)

US	Single	Artist
January 6	"I Love You a Thousand Ways"	Lefty Frizzell
January 6	"The Golden Rocket"	Hank Snow and His Rainbow Ranch Boys
January 13	"The Shotgun Boogie"	Tennessee Ernie Ford
February 10	"There's Been a Change in Me"	Eddy Arnold
March 31	"The Rhumba Boogie"	Hank Snow and His Rainbow Ranch Boys
May 12	"Cold Cold Heart"	Hank Williams with His Drifting Cowboys
May 19	"Kentucky Waltz"	Eddy Arnold
May 26	"I Want to Be With You Always"	Lefty Frizzell
July 14	"I Wanna Play House With You"	Eddy Arnold
August 11	"Hey, Good Lookin'"	Hank Williams with His Drifting Cowboys
September 1	"Always Late with Your Kisses"	Lefty Frizzell
November 3	"Slow Poke"	Pee Wee King and His Golden West Cowboys (feat. Redd Stewart)
December 22	"Let Old Mother Nature Have Her Way"	Carl Smith

Note: Several songs were simultaneous No. 1 hits on the separate "Most Played Juke Box Folk (later Country & Western) Records," "Best Selling Retail Folk (later Country & Western) Records) and – starting December 10 – "Country & Western Records Most Played by Folk Disk Jockeys" charts.

=== Other major hits ===
US	Single	Artist
3	Alabama Jubilee	Red Foley
5	Beautiful Brown Eyes	Jimmy Wakely and the Les Baxter Chorus
9	Blue Christmas	Ernest Tubb
4	Bluebird Island	Hank Snow and Anita Carter
7	Cherokee Boogie (Eh-Oh-Aleena)	Moon Mullican
8	Chew Tobacco Rag	Zeb Turner
4	Crazy Heart	Hank Williams
5	Cryin' Heart Blues	Johnnie & Jack
8	Dear John	Hank Williams
9	Don't Stay Too Long	Ernest Tubb
2	Down the Trail of Achin' Hearts	Hank Snow and Anita Carter
5	Down Yonder	Del Wood
7	Driftwood On the River	Ernest Tubb
5	Heart Strings	Eddy Arnold
6	Hey La La	Ernest Tubb
8	Hobo Boogie	Red Foley
5	Hot Rod Race	Arkie Shibley
7	Hot Rod Race	Ramblin' Jimmie Dolan
7	Hot Rod Race	Red Foley
7	Hot Rod Race	Tiny Hill
3	Howlin' at the Moon	Hank Williams
2	I Can't Help It (If I'm Still in Love with You)	Hank Williams
5	I Don't Want to Be Free	Margaret Whiting and Jimmy Wakely
8	I Love You a Thousand Ways	Hawkshaw Hawkins
10	I'll Sail My Ship Alone	Tiny Hill
8	I'm Waiting Just for You	Hawkshaw Hawkins
8	If Teardrops Were Pennies	Carl Smith
8	It Is No Secret	Stuart Hamblen
9	Lonesome Whistle	Hank Williams
4	Look What Thoughts Will Do	Lefty Frizzell
8	May the Good Lord Bless and Keep You	Eddy Arnold
3	Mockin' Bird Hill	The Pinetoppers
7	Mockin' Bird Hill	Les Paul and Mary Ford
2	Mom and Dad's Waltz	Lefty Frizzell
2	Mr. and Mississippi	Tennessee Ernie Ford
4	Mr. Moon	Carl Smith
6	My Heart Cries for You	Evelyn Knight and Red Foley
7	My Heart Cries for You	Jimmy Wakely
9	Old Soldiers Never Die	Gene Autry
8	On Top of Old Smoky	The Weavers and Terry Gilkyson
4	Poison Love	Johnnie & Jack
7	Shine, Shave, Shower (It's Saturday)	Lefty Frizzell
7	Sick, Sober and Sorry	Johnny Bond
2	Somebody's Been Beating My Time	Eddy Arnold
4	Something Old, Something New	Eddy Arnold
10	Sparrow in the Treetop	Rex Allen
5	The Strange Little Girl	Cowboy Copas
9	The Strange Little Girl	Red Foley and Ernest Tubb
9	The Strange Little Girl	Tennessee Ernie Ford
8	Tailor Made Woman	Tennessee Ernie Ford and Joe "Fingers" Carr
2	Tennessee Waltz, 6,000,000 sold by 1967	Patti Page
6	Tennessee Waltz	Pee Wee King
5	(There'll Be) Peace in the Valley (For Me)	Red Foley
6	Travelin' Blues	Lefty Frizzell
6	Unwanted Sign Upon Your Heart	Hank Snow
7	When You and I Were Young, Maggie Blues	Margaret Whiting and Jimmy Wakely

== Births ==
- January 19 — Crystal Gayle, younger sister of Loretta Lynn who became a star in her own right, mainly in the country-pop vein.
- May 23 — Judy Rodman, backing vocalist who enjoyed fame in the 1980s as a solo performer.
- December 7 — Lyle Evans, bass guitarist of the Western Underground.
