= List of Billboard number-one country songs of 1951 =

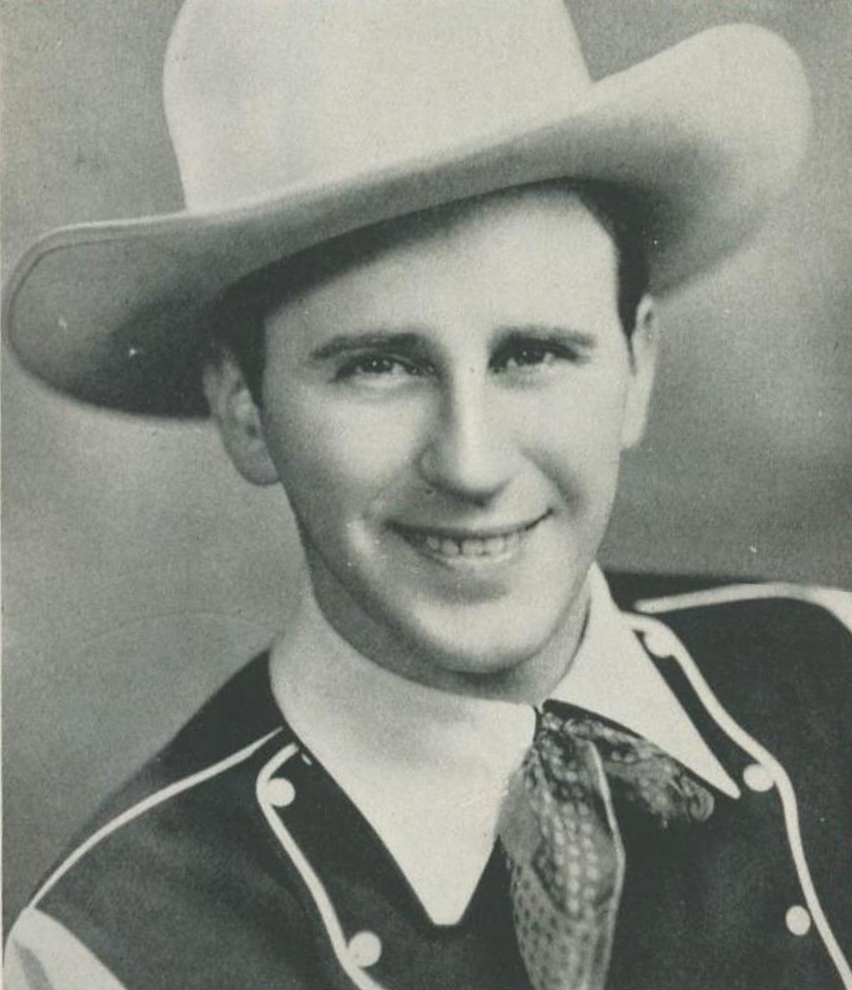
Pee Wee King ended the year at number one on all three charts.

In 1951 Billboard magazine published three charts covering the best-performing country music songs in the United States: Most-Played Juke Box (Country & Western) Records, Best-Selling Retail Folk (Country & Western) Records and Country & Western Records Most Played By Folk Disk Jockeys. The juke box chart was compiled based on a "weekly survey among a selected group of jukebox operators whose locations require country and western records", the best sellers chart based on a "survey among a selected group of retail stores, the majority of whose customers purchase country and western records", and the jockeys chart based on a "weekly survey among a select list of over 400 disk jockeys specializing in country and western tunes". The juke box chart would be discontinued in 1957 and the other two charts merged in 1958 to form a multimetric chart, which has been published weekly since that date and since 2005 has been entitled Hot Country Songs.

In the first issue of Billboard of 1951, each chart had a different number one, although two were by the same artist. Lefty Frizzell was atop both the juke box and jockeys charts, with "If You've Got the Money I've Got the Time" and "I Love You a Thousand Ways" respectively, while the best sellers chart was headed by Hank Snow with "The Golden Rocket". During the year, each of the three charts had a song spend more than ten consecutive weeks at number one: Frizzell had an unbroken run of eleven weeks in the top spot of the best sellers chart with "Always Late (with Your Kisses)" and had a similar run at number one on the jockeys chart with "I Want to Be with You Always". The longest run at number one on any of the charts, however, was the fourteen consecutive weeks which Tennessee Ernie spent atop the juke box chart with "Shotgun Boogie". Frizzell reached number one for the first time in late 1950 and achieved five chart-toppers within 18 months, but soon afterwards his chart performance began to decline, his career suffering in part due to issues in his personal life. He was the only artist with four number-one country songs in 1951; Snow and Eddy Arnold each had three. Hank Williams had two number ones on the jockeys chart, but none on either of the other two charts.

Two artists reached number one for the first time in 1951. Carl Smith spent a single week in December atop the jockeys chart with his first number one, "Let Old Mother Nature Have Her Way", although the song would return to the top spot, and also top the best sellers and juke box charts, in 1952. Smith, who had only entered the chart for the first time earlier in the year, would go on to reach the top 40 nearly 70 times over a 20-year career before he chose to retire from the music industry. Bandleader Pee Wee King's debut chart-topper "Slow Poke", featuring his band the Golden West Cowboys and lead vocalist Redd Stewart, had lengthy runs in the top spot on all three charts in 1951, and ended the year in the number one position on all the listings. It would, however, prove to be the only number one single for King, whose career went into decline in the mid-1950s. Every artist to top the chart in 1951 has been inducted into the Country Music Hall of Fame, beginning with Hank Williams, who was inducted posthumously in the first group of entrants in 1961.

== Chart history ==
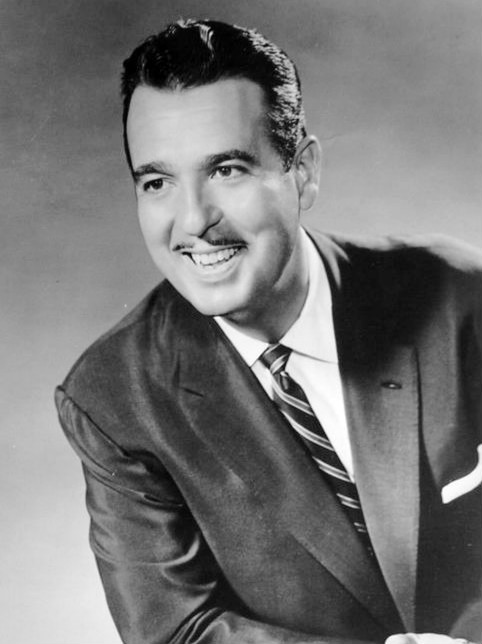
Tennessee Ernie had the longest-running number one on the juke box chart with "Shotgun Boogie".

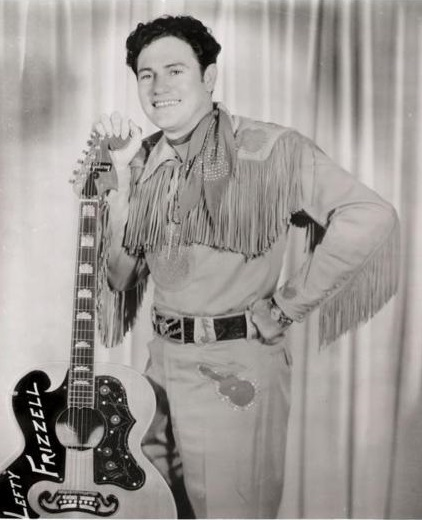
Lefty Frizzell had the highest total number of weeks on the best sellers chart.

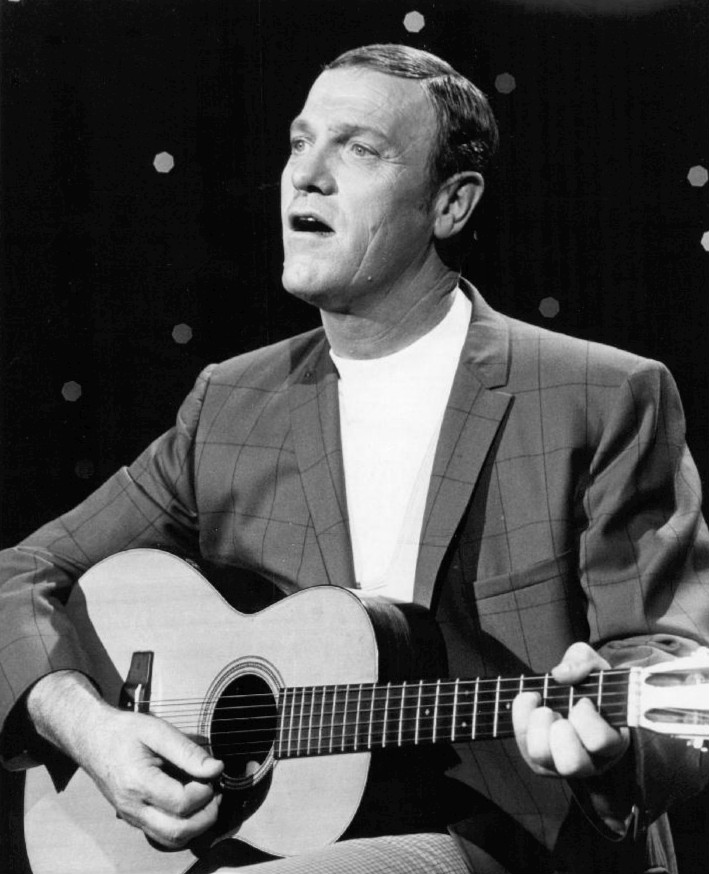
Eddy Arnold (pictured in later life) spent a total of eleven weeks at number one on the jockeys chart with "There's Been a Change in Me".

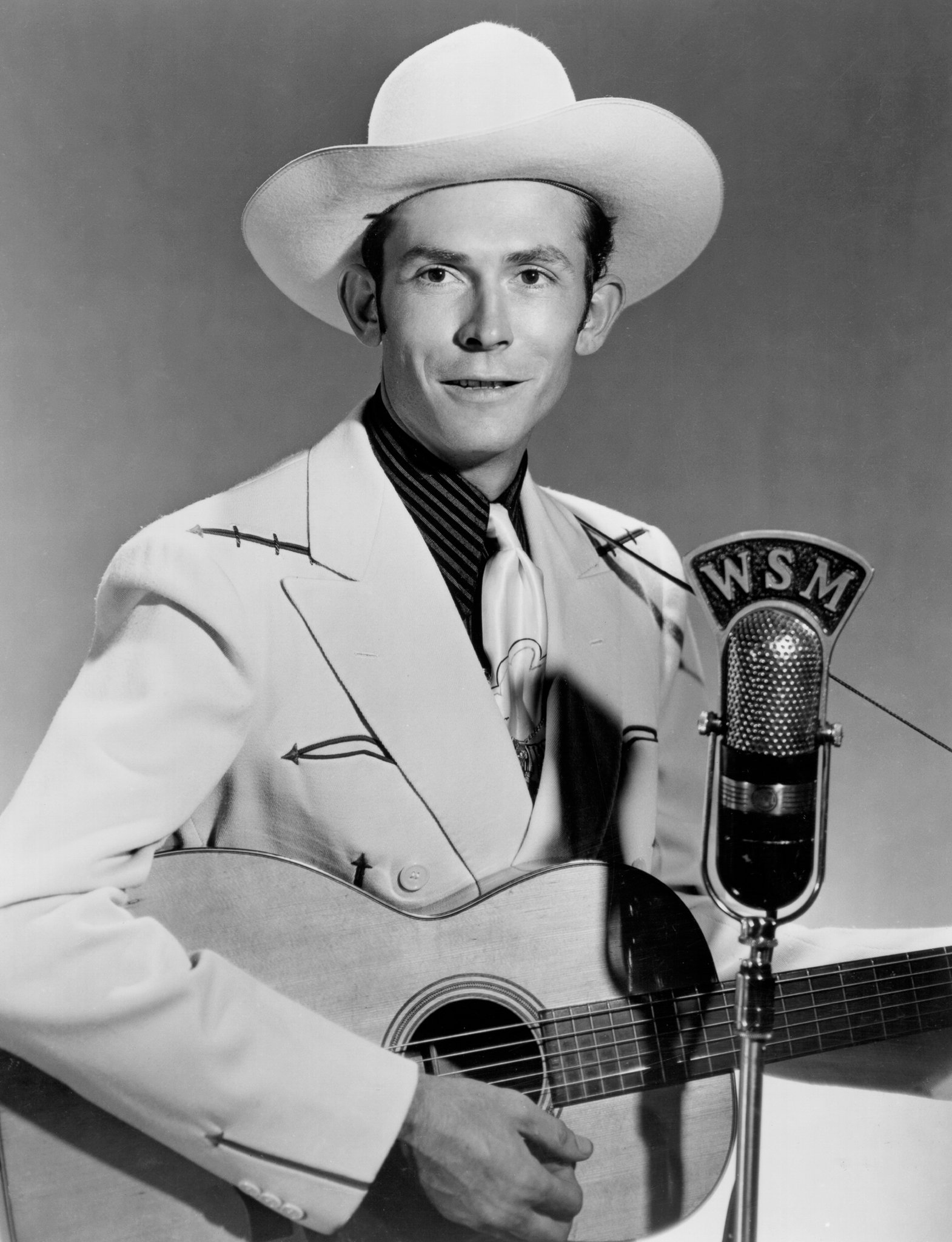
Hank Williams had two number ones on the jockeys chart but none on the other two listings.

Chart history
Issue date	Juke Box		Best Sellers		Jockeys		Ref.
Issue date	Title	Artist(s)	Title	Artist(s)	Title	Artist(s)	Ref.
January 6	"If You've Got the Money I've Got the Time"	Lefty Frizzell	"The Golden Rocket"	Hank Snow	"I Love You a Thousand Ways"	Lefty Frizzell	
January 13	"Shotgun Boogie"	Tennessee Ernie	"The Golden Rocket"	Hank Snow	"I'm Movin' On"	Hank Snow	
January 20	"Shotgun Boogie"	Tennessee Ernie	"I'm Movin' On"	Hank Snow	"I Love You a Thousand Ways"	Lefty Frizzell	
January 27	"Shotgun Boogie"	Tennessee Ernie	"I'm Movin' On"	Hank Snow	"The Golden Rocket"	Hank Snow	
February 3	"Shotgun Boogie"	Tennessee Ernie	"Shotgun Boogie"	Tennessee Ernie	"I Love You a Thousand Ways"	Lefty Frizzell	
February 10	"Shotgun Boogie"	Tennessee Ernie	"I'm Movin' On"	Hank Snow	"There's Been a Change in Me"	Eddy Arnold	
February 17	"Shotgun Boogie"	Tennessee Ernie	"There's Been a Change in Me"	Eddy Arnold	"There's Been a Change in Me"	Eddy Arnold	
February 24	"Shotgun Boogie"	Tennessee Ernie	"Shotgun Boogie"	Tennessee Ernie	"Shotgun Boogie"	Tennessee Ernie	
March 3	"Shotgun Boogie"	Tennessee Ernie	"There's Been a Change in Me"	Eddy Arnold	"There's Been a Change in Me"	Eddy Arnold	
March 10	"Shotgun Boogie"	Tennessee Ernie	"There's Been a Change in Me"	Eddy Arnold	"There's Been a Change in Me"	Eddy Arnold	
March 17	"Shotgun Boogie"	Tennessee Ernie	"Shotgun Boogie"	Tennessee Ernie	"There's Been a Change in Me"	Eddy Arnold	
March 24	"Shotgun Boogie"	Tennessee Ernie	"There's Been a Change in Me"	Eddy Arnold	"There's Been a Change in Me"	Eddy Arnold	
March 31	"Shotgun Boogie"	Tennessee Ernie	"Rhumba Boogie"	Hank Snow	"There's Been a Change in Me"	Eddy Arnold	
April 7	"Shotgun Boogie"	Tennessee Ernie	"Rhumba Boogie"	Hank Snow	"There's Been a Change in Me"	Eddy Arnold	
April 14	"Shotgun Boogie"	Tennessee Ernie	"Rhumba Boogie"	Hank Snow	"There's Been a Change in Me"	Eddy Arnold	
April 21	"Rhumba Boogie"	Hank Snow	"Rhumba Boogie"	Hank Snow	"There's Been a Change in Me"	Eddy Arnold	
April 28	"Rhumba Boogie"	Hank Snow	"Rhumba Boogie"	Hank Snow	"Rhumba Boogie"	Hank Snow	
May 5	"Rhumba Boogie"	Hank Snow	"Rhumba Boogie"	Hank Snow	"There's Been a Change in Me"	Eddy Arnold	
May 12	"Rhumba Boogie"	Hank Snow	"Rhumba Boogie"	Hank Snow	"Cold, Cold Heart"	Hank Williams	
May 19	"Rhumba Boogie"	Hank Snow	"Kentucky Waltz"	Eddy Arnold	"Rhumba Boogie"	Hank Snow	
May 26	"Kentucky Waltz"	Eddy Arnold	"Rhumba Boogie"	Hank Snow	"I Want to Be With You Always"	Lefty Frizzell	
June 2	"Kentucky Waltz"	Eddy Arnold	"Kentucky Waltz"	Eddy Arnold	"I Want to Be With You Always"	Lefty Frizzell	
June 9	"I Want to Be With You Always"	Lefty Frizzell	"I Want to Be With You Always"	Lefty Frizzell	"I Want to Be With You Always"	Lefty Frizzell	
June 16	"I Want to Be With You Always"	Lefty Frizzell	"I Want to Be With You Always"	Lefty Frizzell	"I Want to Be With You Always"	Lefty Frizzell	
June 23	"I Want to Be With You Always"	Lefty Frizzell	"Kentucky Waltz"	Eddy Arnold	"I Want to Be With You Always"	Lefty Frizzell	
June 30	"I Want to Be With You Always"	Lefty Frizzell	"I Want to Be With You Always"	Lefty Frizzell	"I Want to Be With You Always"	Lefty Frizzell	
July 7	"I Want to Be With You Always"	Lefty Frizzell	"I Want to Be With You Always"	Lefty Frizzell	"I Want to Be With You Always"	Lefty Frizzell	
July 14	"I Want to Play House With You"	Eddy Arnold	"I Want to Be With You Always"	Lefty Frizzell	"I Want to Be With You Always"	Lefty Frizzell	
July 21	"I Want to Play House With You"	Eddy Arnold	"I Want to Be With You Always"	Lefty Frizzell	"I Want to Be With You Always"	Lefty Frizzell	
July 28	"I Want to Play House With You"	Eddy Arnold	"I Want to Play House With You"	Eddy Arnold	"I Want to Be With You Always"	Lefty Frizzell	
August 4	"I Want to Play House With You"	Eddy Arnold	"I Want to Play House With You"	Eddy Arnold	"I Want to Be With You Always"	Lefty Frizzell	
August 11	"I Want to Play House With You"	Eddy Arnold	"I Want to Play House With You"	Eddy Arnold	"Hey Good Lookin'"	Hank Williams	
August 18	"I Want to Play House With You"	Eddy Arnold	"I Want to Play House With You"	Eddy Arnold	"Hey Good Lookin'"	Hank Williams	
August 25	"I Want to Play House With You"	Eddy Arnold	"I Want to Play House With You"	Eddy Arnold	"Hey Good Lookin'"	Hank Williams	
September 1	"I Want to Play House With You"	Eddy Arnold	"Always Late (with Your Kisses)"	Lefty Frizzell	"Hey Good Lookin'"	Hank Williams	
September 8	"I Want to Play House With You"	Eddy Arnold	"I Want to Play House With You"	Eddy Arnold	"Hey Good Lookin'"	Hank Williams	
September 15	"I Want to Play House With You"	Eddy Arnold	"Always Late (with Your Kisses)"	Lefty Frizzell	"Always Late (with Your Kisses)"	Lefty Frizzell	
September 22	"I Want to Play House With You"	Eddy Arnold	"Always Late (with Your Kisses)"	Lefty Frizzell	"Always Late (with Your Kisses)"	Lefty Frizzell	
September 29	"Always Late (with Your Kisses)"	Lefty Frizzell	"Always Late (with Your Kisses)"	Lefty Frizzell	"Always Late (with Your Kisses)"	Lefty Frizzell	
October 6	"Always Late (with Your Kisses)"	Lefty Frizzell	"Always Late (with Your Kisses)"	Lefty Frizzell	"Always Late (with Your Kisses)"	Lefty Frizzell	
October 13	"Always Late (with Your Kisses)"	Lefty Frizzell	"Always Late (with Your Kisses)"	Lefty Frizzell	"Hey Good Lookin'"	Hank Williams	
October 20	"Always Late (with Your Kisses)"	Lefty Frizzell	"Always Late (with Your Kisses)"	Lefty Frizzell	"Always Late (with Your Kisses)"	Lefty Frizzell	
October 27	"Always Late (with Your Kisses)"	Lefty Frizzell	"Always Late (with Your Kisses)"	Lefty Frizzell	"Always Late (with Your Kisses)"	Lefty Frizzell	
November 3^{[a]}	"Always Late (with Your Kisses)"	Lefty Frizzell	"Always Late (with Your Kisses)"	Lefty Frizzell	"Hey Good Lookin'"	Hank Williams	
November 3^{[a]}	"Slow Poke"	Pee Wee King	"Always Late (with Your Kisses)"	Lefty Frizzell	"Hey Good Lookin'"	Hank Williams	
November 10	"Slow Poke"	Pee Wee King	"Always Late (with Your Kisses)"	Lefty Frizzell	"Slow Poke"	Pee Wee King	
November 17	"Slow Poke"	Pee Wee King	"Always Late (with Your Kisses)"	Lefty Frizzell	"Hey Good Lookin'"	Hank Williams	
November 24	"Slow Poke"	Pee Wee King	"Always Late (with Your Kisses)"	Lefty Frizzell	"Slow Poke"	Pee Wee King	
December 1	"Slow Poke"	Pee Wee King	"Slow Poke"	Pee Wee King	"Slow Poke"	Pee Wee King	
December 8	"Slow Poke"	Pee Wee King	"Slow Poke"	Pee Wee King	"Slow Poke"	Pee Wee King	
December 15	"Slow Poke"	Pee Wee King	"Slow Poke"	Pee Wee King	"Slow Poke"	Pee Wee King	
December 22	"Slow Poke"	Pee Wee King	"Slow Poke"	Pee Wee King	"Let Old Mother Nature Have Her Way"	Carl Smith	
December 29	"Slow Poke"	Pee Wee King	"Slow Poke"	Pee Wee King	"Slow Poke"	Pee Wee King	

a. Two songs tied for number one on the juke box chart.

== See also ==
- List of Billboard Top Country & Western Records of 1951
- 1951 in country music
- List of artists who reached number one on the U.S. country chart
