= You Belong to Me =

You Belong to Me may refer to:

== Film and literature ==
- You Belong to Me (1934 film), a drama starring Helen Morgan
- You Belong to Me (1941 film), a romantic comedy starring Henry Fonda and Barbara Stanwyck
- You Belong to Me (2001 film), a television movie
  - You Belong to Me, a novel by Mary Higgins Clark, basis for the 2001 film
- You Belong to Me (2007 film), a thriller starring Patti D'Arbanville
- You Belong to Me (2008 film), a television film starring Shannon Elizabeth
- You Belong to Me (2021 film), a psychological thriller also known as Every Breath You Take

== Music ==
=== Songs ===
- "You Belong to Me" (1952 song), a song popularized by Patti Page and Jo Stafford, as well as more recently by Bob Dylan and, later, Tori Amos
- "You Belong to Me" (Carly Simon song), originally recorded by The Doobie Brothers
- "You Belong to Me" (JX song), by Jake Williams recording as JX, featuring Shena
- "You Belong to Me", a song by Victor Herbert from The Century Girl
- "You Belong to Me", a song by Gary Glitter from Silver Star
- "You Belong to Me", a song by Elvis Costello from This Year's Model
- "You Belong to Me", a song by Bryan Adams from Get Up
- "You Belong to Me", a song by Trey Songz from Anticipation

=== Albums ===
- Jo Stafford albums:
  - You Belong to Me (1989 Jo Stafford album)
  - You Belong to Me (ASV/Living Era), 2004
  - You Belong to Me (Memoir), 2004
  - You Belong to Me (Rajon), 2004
  - You Belong to Me (Remember), 2004
  - You Belong to Me (2008 Jo Stafford album)
- You Belong to Me, a 1962 album by The Duprees

== See also ==
- "You Belong with Me", a 2009 song by Taylor Swift
- "Tonight You Belong to Me", by Billy Rose and Lee David
- I Belong to You (disambiguation)
