= Tennessee Ernie Ford discography =

The following is the discography of American singer Tennessee Ernie Ford.

== Albums ==
Year	Album	Chart positions		Cert. (RIAA)	Label
Year	Album	US Country	US	Cert. (RIAA)	Label
1956	This Lusty Land!		12		Capitol Records
1956	Hymns		2	Platinum	Capitol Records
1957	Spirituals		5	Gold	Capitol Records
1957	Ford Favorites				Capitol Records
1957	Ol' Rockin' Ern'				Capitol Records
1958	Nearer the Cross		5	Gold	Capitol Records
1958	The Star Carol		4	Platinum	Capitol Records
1959	Gather 'Round				Capitol Records
1959	A Friend We Have				Capitol Records
1960	Sing a Hymn with Me		23		Capitol Records
1960	Sixteen Tons				Capitol Records
1960	Sing a Spiritual with Me				Capitol Records
1960	Come to the Fair				Capitol Records
1961	Civil War Songs of the North				Capitol Records
1961	Civil War Songs of the South				Capitol Records
1961	Looks at Love				Capitol Records
1961	Hymns at Home		67		Capitol Records
1962	Mississippi Showboat		110		Capitol Records
1962	I Love to Tell the Story		43		Capitol Records
1962	Book of Favorite Hymns		71		Capitol Records
1963	Long, Long Ago				Capitol Records
1963	We Gather Together				Capitol Records
1963	Story of Christmas		14		Capitol Records
1964	Great Gospel Songs				Capitol Records
1964	Country Hits Feelin' Blue				Capitol Records
1964	World's Best Loved Hymns				Capitol Records
1965	Let Me Walk with Thee				Capitol Records
1965	Sing We Now of Christmas		31		Capitol Records
1966	My Favorite Things				Capitol Records
1966	Wonderful Peace				Capitol Records
1966	God Lives				Capitol Records
1966	Bless Your Pea Pickin' Heart				Capitol Records
1967	Aloha				Capitol Records
1967	Faith of Our Fathers				Capitol Records
1968	Our Garden of Hymns (w/ Marilyn Horne)				Capitol Records
1968	World of Pop and Country Hits				Capitol Records
1968	O Come All Ye Faithful				Capitol Records
1968	The Best of Tennessee Ernie Ford Hymns				Capitol Records
1969	Songs I Like to Sing				Capitol Records
1969	New Wave				Capitol Records
1969	Holy, Holy, Holy				Capitol Records
1970	America the Beautiful		192		Capitol Records
1970	Everything Is Beautiful				Capitol Records
1971	Abide with Me				Capitol Records
1971	C-H-R-I-S-T-M-A-S				Capitol Records
1971	Folk Album				Capitol Records
1972	Mr. Words and Music				Capitol Records
1972	Standin' in the Need of Prayer				Capitol Records
1973	Country Morning	46			Capitol Records
1973	Ernie Ford Sings About Jesus				Capitol Records
1974	Make A Joyful Noise	35			Capitol Records
1975	Ernie Sings & Glen Picks (w/ Glen Campbell)				Capitol Records
1976	Sing His Great Love				Capitol Records
1976	For the 83rd Time				Capitol Records
1977	He Touched Me				Word Records
1978	Swing Wide Your Golden Gate				Word Records
1979	Ramblin' Down Country Roads With Tennessee Ernie Ford				Word Records
1980	Tell Me the Old, Old Story				Word Records
1982	There's A Song In My Heart				Word Records
1983	Sunday School Songs For Children of All Ages				Word Records
1984	Keep Looking Up				Word Records
2009	6000 Sunset Boulevard: Featuring The Billy Liebert Band				Sundazed Music
2014	Amazing Grace: 14 Treasured Hymns	19	159		Gaither Music

== Singles ==
Year	Single (A-side, B-side) Both sides from same album except where indicated	Chart positions		Album
Year	Single (A-side, B-side) Both sides from same album except where indicated	US Country	US	Album
1949	"Tennessee Border"	8		Non-album track
1949	"Milk 'Em in the Morning Blues"	15		Ol' Rockin' Ern
1949	"Country Junction"	14		Ol' Rockin' Ern
1949	"Philadelphia Lawyer"			Sixteen Tons
1949	"Smokey Mountain Boogie" b/w "You'll Find Her Name Written There" (non-album track)	8		Ol' Rockin' Ern
1949	"Mule Train"	1	9	Sixteen Tons
1949	"Anticipation Blues"	3		Ol' Rockin' Ern
1950	"The Cry of the Wild Goose" b/w "The Donkey Serenade"	2	15	Sixteen Tons
1950	"My Hobby" b/w "I've Got to Feed 'em in the Morning"			Non-album tracks
1950	"Ain't Nobody's Business but My Own" (with Kay Starr)	5	22	Non-album tracks
1950	"I'll Never Be Free" (with Kay Starr)	2	3	Non-album tracks
1950	"What This Country Needs" b/w "The Lord's Lariat" (from Ol' Rockin' Ern)			Non-album tracks
1950	"Cincinnati Dancing Pig" b/w "Bright Lights and Blonde Haired Women"; Both sides with The Starlighters			Non-album tracks
1950	"Little Juan Pedro" b/w "Bryant's Boogie"			Non-album tracks
1950	"The Shotgun Boogie"	1	14	Ol' Rockin' Ern
1950	"I Ain't Gonna Let It Happen (No More)"	flip		Ol' Rockin' Ern
1951	"Tailor Made Woman" (with Joe "Fingers" Carr)	8		Non-album tracks
1951	"Stack-O-Lee" (with Joe "Fingers" Carr)			Non-album tracks
1951	"Ocean of Tears" (with Kay Starr)		15	Non-album tracks
1951	"You're My Sugar" (with Kay Starr)		22	Non-album tracks
1951	"Mr. and Mississippi" b/w "She's My Baby" (from Ol' Rockin' Ern)	2	18	Non-album tracks
1951	"The Strange Little Girl"	9		Non-album tracks
1951	"Kentucky Waltz"	flip		Non-album tracks
1951	"Kissin' Bug Boogie" b/w "Woman Is a Five Letter Word"	12		Non-album tracks
1951	"Hey Good Lookin'" b/w "Cool, Cool Kisses"; Both sides with Helen O'Connell			Non-album tracks
1951	"Rock City Boogie" b/w "Streamlined Cannonball"; Both sides with The Dinning Sisters			Non-album tracks
1951	"Christmas Dinner" b/w "A Rootin' Tootin' Santa Claus"			Non-album tracks
1952	"Hambone" (with Bucky Tibbs) b/w "The Gandy Dancer's Ball"			Non-album tracks
1952	"Everybody's Got a Girl but Me" (Note: "Everybody's Got a Girl But Me" peaked at No. 2 on the Capitol Records' "Top Country & Hillbilly" best sellers list in 1952) b/w "Put Your Arms Around Me"			Non-album tracks
1952	"Snowshoe Thompson" b/w "Fatback Louisiana USA"			Non-album tracks
1952	"Blackberry Boogie" b/w "Tennessee Local" (non-album track)	6		Ol' Rockin' Ern
1952	"Hog-Tied over You" b/w "False Hearted Girl"; Both sides with Ella Mae Morse			Non-album tracks
1953	"I Don't Know" b/w "Sweet Temptation"			Non-album tracks
1953	"Hey, Mr. Cotton Picker" b/w "Three Things (A Man Must Do)"	8		Non-album tracks
1953	"Don't Start Courtin' in a Hot Rod Ford" b/w "We're a-Growin' Up"; Both sides with Molly Bee			Non-album tracks
1953	"Kiss Me Big"			Ol' Rockin' Ern
1953	"Catfish Boogie"		flip	Ol' Rockin' Ern
1954	"Honeymoon's Over" b/w "This Must Be the Place"; Both sides with Betty Hutton		16	Non-album tracks
1954	"River of No Return" b/w "Give Me Your Word"	9		Ford Favorites
1954	"Ein Zwei Drei" b/w "Losing You"			Non-album tracks
1954	"Somebody Bigger Than You or I" b/w "There Is Beauty in Everything"			Non-album tracks
1955	"The Ballad of Davy Crockett" b/w "Farewell"	4	5	Non-album tracks
1955	"His Hands" b/w "I Am a Pilgrim"	13		Spirituals
1955	"Sixteen Tons"	1	1	Ford Favorites
1956	"You Don't Have to Be a Baby to Cry"		78	Ford Favorites
1956	"That's All" b/w "Bright Lights and Blonde Haired Women" (from Sixteen Tons)	12	17	Ford Favorites
1956	"Rovin' Gambler" b/w "John Henry"		60	This Lusty Land!
1956	"Rock and Roll Boogie" b/w "Call Me Darling, Call Me Sweetheart" (from Ford Favorites)			Non-album track
1956	"First Born" b/w "Have You Seen Her"		46	Ford Favorites
1957	"Watermelon Song"		87	Ford Favorites
1957	"One Suit"		93	Ford Favorites
1957	"False Hearted Girl" b/w "Lonely Man" (from Bless Your Pea Pickin' Heart!)			This Lusty Land!
1957	"In the Middle of an Island"		23	Non-album track
1957	"Ivy League"			Bless Your Pea Pickin' Heart!
1958	"Bless Your Pea Pickin' Heart" b/w "Down Deep"			Bless Your Pea Pickin' Heart!
1958	"Sunday Barbeque" b/w "Love Makes the World Go Round"		97	Bless Your Pea Pickin' Heart!
1958	"Glad Rags" b/w "Sleepin' at the Foot of the Bed" (non-album track)		100	Bless Your Pea Pickin' Heart!
1959	"Black-Eyed Susie" b/w "Code of the Mountains"			I Love You So Much It Hurts Me
1959	"Love Is the Only Thing" b/w "Sunny Side of Heaven"			Non-album track
1960	"O Mary Don't You Weep" b/w "Joshua Fit the Battle"			Sing a Spiritual with Me
1960	"Little Klinker" b/w "Jingle-o-the-Brownie"			Non-album tracks
1960	"Bless This Land" b/w "Lord of All Creation"			Non-album tracks
1961	"Dark as a Dungeon" b/w "His Love (Makes the World Go Round)" (non-album track)			This Lusty Land!
1961	"Little Red Rockin' Hood" b/w "I Gotta Have My Baby Back" (from Ernie Looks at Love)			Non-album track
1962	"Take Your Girlie to the Movies" b/w "There'll Be No New Piano Tunes on This Old Piano"			Here Comes the Tennessee Ernie Ford Mississippi Showboat
1962	"Work Song" b/w "Rags and Old Iron" (from I Love You So Much It Hurts Me)			Everything Is Beautiful
1962	"How Great Thou Art" b/w "Eternal Life" (from God Lives!)			I Love to Tell the Story
1965	"Hicktown" b/w "Sixteen Tons" (from Sixteen Tons)	9		Non-album tracks
1965	"Girl Don't You Know" b/w "Now It's All Over" (from I Love You So Much It Hurts Me)			Non-album tracks
1965	"Sing We Now of Christmas" (Note: "Sing We Now of Christmas" peaked at No. 2 on the RPM Top Singles chart in Canada) b/w "The Little Drummer Boy"			Sing We Now of Christmas
1966	"God Lives" b/w "How Great Thou Art"			God Lives
1967	"Lahaina Luna" b/w "Pearly Shells"			Aloha from Tennessee Ernie Ford
1967	"The Road" b/w "Hand-Me-Down Things"			Non-album tracks
1968	"Talk to the Animals" b/w "What a Wonderful World"			World of Pop and Country Hits
1969	"Honey-Eyed Girl (That's You That's You)" b/w "Good Morning, Dear"	54		The New Wave
1970	"Rainy Night In Georgia" b/w "Let the Lovelight in Your Eyes Lead Me On"			Everything Is Beautiful
1971	"Happy Songs of Love" b/w "Don't Let the Good Life Pass You By" (from 25th Anniversary Yesterday–Today)	58		Non-album track
1972	"Pea-Pickin' Cook" b/w "The Song" (non-album track)			It's a Ford
1973	"Printers Alley Stars" b/w "Baby"	66		Country Morning
1973	"Farther Down the River (Where the Fishin's Good)" b/w "You've Still Got Love All Over You"	73		Country Morning
1973	"Colorado Country Morning" (Note: "Colorado Country Morning" peaked at No. 85 on the RPM Country Tracks chart in Canada) b/w "Daddy Usta Say"	70		Country Morning
1974	"Sweet Child of Sunshine" b/w "She Picked Up the Pieces" (non-album track)			Country Morning
1974	"I've Got Confidence" b/w "I'd Like to Be" (from Country Morning)			Make a Joyful Noise
1975	"Come On Down" b/w "Bits and Pieces of Life" (non-album track)	52		Make a Joyful Noise
1975	"Baby" b/w "I'd Like to Be"; Both sides with Andra Willis	63		Country Morning
1975	"The Devil Ain't a Lonely Woman's Friend" b/w "Smokey Taverns, Bar Room Girls"	96		Non-album tracks
1976	"I Been to Georgia on a Fast Train" b/w "Baby's Home" (non-album track)	95		For the 83rd Time
1976	"Sweet Feelins" b/w "Dogs and Sheriff John"			For the 83rd Time
