= You Belong to Me (Memoir) =

Compilation album by Jo Stafford
- Released: June 29, 2004
- Genre: Traditional pop
- Label: Memoir

Professional ratings
Review scores
| Source | Rating |
|---|---|
| Allmusic | 4/5 stars |

You Belong to Me is a 2004 compilation album of songs recorded by American singer Jo Stafford. It is one of many Stafford compilations to have been released in the early 2000s under the title You Belong to Me, the name derived from the song of the same name, which became one of her best known hits during the 1950s. This album was released on June 29, 2004, and appears on the Memoir label.

== Track listing ==
1. Kissin' Bug Boogie
2. Hawaiian War Chant
3. Jambalaya (On the Bayou)
4. Gabriella (The Gamblin' Lady)
5. Georgia on My Mind
6. Always True to You in My Fashion
7. I Hate Men
8. Wunderbar
9. Walkin' My Baby Back Home
10. Early Autumn
11. The Moment I Saw You
12. Our Very Own
13. Pretty Eyed Baby
14. Shrimp Boats
15. Around the Corner
16. I'm Gonna Wash That Man Right Outa My Hair
17. Some Enchanted Evening
18. With These Hands
19. Stardust
20. No Other Love
21. Don't Worry 'Bout Me
22. You Belong to Me
23. Allentown Jail
24. Tennessee Waltz
