= Rainbow Ranch (disambiguation) =

Rainbow Ranch may refer to:

- Rainbow Ranch, a 1933 American film
- Rainbow Ranch, a NRHP historic home
- Rainbow Ranch Boys, Musician Hank Snow's band
