= You Belong to Me (Remember) =

Compilation album by Jo Stafford
- Released: June 29, 2004
- Genre: Traditional pop
- Label: Remember Records

Professional ratings
Review scores
| Source | Rating |
|---|---|
| Allmusic | 4/5 stars |

You Belong to Me is a 2004 compilation album of songs recorded by American singer Jo Stafford. It is one of many Stafford compilations to have been released in the early 2000s under the title You Belong to Me, the name derived from the song of the same name which became one of her best known hits during the 1950s. This album was released on June 29, 2004 by Remember Records.

== Track listing ==
1. "You Belong to Me"
2. "Shrimp Boats"
3. "Keep it a Secret"
4. "Jambalaya"
5. "If"
6. "Ay-Round the Corner"
7. "Tennessee Waltz"
8. "Hambone"
9. "Some Enchanted Evening"
10. "Ragtime Cowboy Joe"
11. "Whispering Hope"
12. "Hey, Good Lookin'"
13. "No Other Love"
14. "Pretty Eyed Baby"
15. "Somebody"
16. "If You've Got the Money, I've Got the Time"
17. "In the Cool, Cool, Cool of the Evening"
18. "Scarlet Ribbons (For Her Hair)"
19. "(Tonight We're) Setting the Woods on Fire"
20. "Once and for Always"
21. "Congratulations"
22. "Kissin' Bug Boogie"
23. "It Is No Secret (What God Can Do)"
24. "Gambella (Gambling Lady)"
25. "Early Autumn"
26. "(Now and Then There's) A Fool Such as I"
