= There's Been a Change in Me =

1951 song written by Cy Coben

Single by Eddy Arnold
- B-side: "Tie Me To Your Apron Strings Again"
- Released: 1950
- Genre: country
- Length: 2:19
- Label: RCA Victor
- Songwriter: Cy Coben

"There's Been a Change in Me" is a 1951 song written by Cy Coben and performed by Eddy Arnold. The song went to number one on the Country & Western Best Seller chart for four weeks and spent a total of twenty-three weeks on the chart.

| Preceded by "The Shotgun Boogie" by Tennessee Ernie Ford | Best Selling Retail Folk (Country & Western) Records; February 10, 1951 | Succeeded by "The Rhumba Boogie" by Hank Snow |
