= You Belong to Me (2008 Jo Stafford album) =

Compilation album by Jo Stafford
- Released: April 8, 2008
- Genre: Traditional pop
- Label: Dynamic Records

Professional ratings
Review scores
Source	Rating
Allmusic	4/5 stars

You Belong to Me is a 2008 compilation album of songs by American artist Jo Stafford. Released on the Dynamic label on April 8, 2008, the album features 16 of Stafford's hits.

== Track listing ==
1. "You Belong to Me"
2. Jambalaya"
3. "Candy"
4. "Long Ago (And Far Away)"
5. "Serenade of the Bells"
6. "Teach Me Tonight"
7. "That's for Me"
8. "Day by Day"
9. "If"
10. "My Darling, My Darling"
11. "Shrimp Boats"
12. "Symphony"
13. "A-Round the Corner"
14. "Hey Good Lookin'"
15. "I Love You"
16. "It's Almost Tomorrow"
