= You Belong to Me (ASV/Living Era) =

Compilation album by Jo Stafford
- Released: June 29, 2004
- Genre: Traditional pop
- Label: ASV/Living Era

Professional ratings
Review scores
| Source | Rating |
|---|---|
| Allmusic | 4/5 stars |

You Belong to Me is a 2004 compilation album of songs recorded by American singer Jo Stafford. It is one of many Stafford compilations to have been released in the early 2000s under the title You Belong to Me, the name derived from the song of the same name which became one of her best known hits during the 1950s. This album was released on June 29, 2004 and appears on the ASV and Living Era labels.

== Track listing ==
1. "Blues in the Night" [From Blues in the Night]
2. "How Sweet You Are" [From Thank Your Lucky Stars]
3. "I Remember You" [From The Fleet's In]
4. "Tumbling Tumbleweeds" [From Tumbling Tumbleweeds]
5. "On the Sunny Side of the Street" [From Lew Leslie's International Revue]
6. "Let's Take the Long Way Home" [From Here Come the Waves]
7. "The Boy Next Door" [From Meet Me in St. Louis]
8. "Over the Rainbow" [From The Wizard of Oz]
9. "Georgia on My Mind"
10. "Walkin' My Baby Back Home"
11. "September Song" [From Knickerbocker Holiday]
12. "Almost Like Being in Love" [From Brigadoon]
13. "Smoke Dreams"
14. "The Stanley Steamer" [From Summer Holiday]
15. "The Gentleman Is a Dope" [From Allegro]
16. "Autumn in New York" [From Thumbs Up]
17. "He's Gone Away"
18. "The Best Things in Life Are Free" [From Good News]
19. "Roses of Picardy"
20. "In the Still of the Night" [From Rosalie]
21. "Haunted Heart" [From Inside USA]
22. "Smoke Gets in Your Eyes" [From Roberta]
23. "Make Believe" [From Show Boat]
24. "If I Loved You" [From Carousel]
25. "Say Something Sweet to Your Sweetheart"
26. "Red River Valley"
27. "My Darling, My Darling" [From Where's Charley?]
28. "Always True to You in My Fashion" [From Kiss Me, Kate]
29. "Some Enchanted Evening" [From South Pacific]
30. "Whispering Hope"
31. "Ragtime Cowboy Joe"
32. "Scarlet Ribbons (For Her Hair)"
33. "Play a Simple Melody" [From Watch Your Step]
34. "Pagan Love Song" [From The Pagan]
35. "Sometime"
36. "No Other Love"
37. "The Old Rugged Cross"
38. "Goodnight Irene"
39. "Autumn Leaves" (Les Feuilles Mortes)
40. "La Vie en Rose"
41. "If"
42. "The Tennessee Waltz"
43. "If You've Got the Money, I've Got the Time"
44. "Teardrops from My Eyes"
45. "Shrimp Boats"
46. "Till We Meet Again"
47. "The Hawaiian War Chant"
48. "Allentown Jail"
49. "Hey, Good Lookin'"
50. "There's a Small Hotel" [From On Your Toes]
51. "Hambone"
52. "You Belong to Me"
53. "Jambalaya (On the Bayou)"
54. "Keep It a Secret"
