= Chilton Price =

American songwriter

Chilton Price (December 25, 1913 – January 14, 2010) was an American songwriter, primarily known for country music songs, which became pop music hits.

She was born Chilton Searcy near Fern Creek, Kentucky, the daughter of Chesley Hunter Searcy, a lawyer, and Lillian Searcy, a pianist. At the age of 5, she was taught a couple of piano chords by her father, who was an amateur musician who played by ear. She studied music appreciation at the University of Louisville. During the 1930s and 1940s, she played violin for the Louisville Orchestra. She got a job as a music librarian at the Louisville radio station WAVE, where country music artists Pee Wee King and Redd Stewart were regular performers.

She showed them some songs she had written, and they convinced her to publish them; since she had little experience in the commercial music world, she gave them partial credit, and so the songs "Slow Poke" and "You Belong to Me" were published with credits given as King/Stewart/Price. The former became a big hit for King, with a vocal by Stewart; the latter was a major hit for Jo Stafford, and later was covered by The Duprees. She was said to be happy with the arrangement, even though she had to share credit for songs she wrote herself, being grateful for the break she got in this way. She wrote other songs under her name only, including "Never Look Back" in 1954, which Doris Day sang in the film Love Me or Leave Me and which was a Top 20 hit on one of the U.S. charts.

== Personal life ==
She was married for 65 years to Louisville businessman Robert L. Price, and had a daughter, two grandchildren and seven great-grandchildren. She was widowed in 2000. She died in Louisville on January 14, 2010, aged 96.

Price was an avid bridge player and played at the Louisville chapter of the ACBL, where she met ACBL Life Master Nona Dorsky.
