= My Own True Love (song) =

Song by Mack David and Max Steiner

Single by Jimmy Clanton
- B-side: "Little Boy in Love"
- Released: June 1959
- Recorded: 1959
- Genre: Rock and roll
- Length: 2:32
- Label: Ace
- Songwriters: Mack David, Max Steiner

Jimmy Clanton singles chronology
"My Love Is Strong" (1959)	"My Own True Love" (1959)	"Go, Jimmy, Go" (1959)

"My Own True Love"

Single by The Duprees
- B-side: "Ginny"
- Released: October 1962
- Recorded: 1962
- Genre: Doo-wop
- Length: 2:27
- Label: Coed
- Songwriters: Mack David, Max Steiner

The Duprees singles chronology
"You Belong to Me" (1962)	"My Own True Love" (1962)	"I Wish I Could Believe You" (1962)

"My Own True Love" is a song written by Mack David and Max Steiner and made popular by Jimmy Clanton in 1959 and the Duprees in 1962. Jimmy Clanton's version peaked at No. 33 and the Duprees' version peaked at No. 13 on the Billboard Hot 100 singles chart. The melody of the song is also known as Tara's Theme from the movie Gone with the Wind.

== Weekly charts ==
=== Jimmy Clanton version ===
Chart (1959)	Peak position
US Billboard Hot 100	33

=== The Duprees version ===
Chart (1962)	Peak position
US Billboard Hot 100	13
