= I Belong to You =

I Belong to You may refer to:

- I Belong to You (album) or the title song, by Emilia Mitiku, 2013
- "I Belong to You" (Caro Emerald song), 2013
- "I Belong to You" (Gina G song), 1996
- "I Belong to You" (Lenny Kravitz song), 1998
- "I Belong to You" (Love Unlimited song), 1974
- "I Belong to You" (Nikki Sudden song), 1991
- "I Belong to You" (Toni Braxton song), 1994
- "I Belong to You" (Whitney Houston song), 1992
- "I Belong to You (Every Time I See Your Face)", by Rome, 1997
- "I Belong to You (Il Ritmo della Passione)", by Eros Ramazzotti and Anastacia, 2006
- "I Belong to You (+Mon Cœur S'ouvre a ta Voix)", by Muse from The Resistance, 2009

== See also ==
- You Belong to Me (disambiguation)
