= Josef Marais =

South African musician (1905–1978)

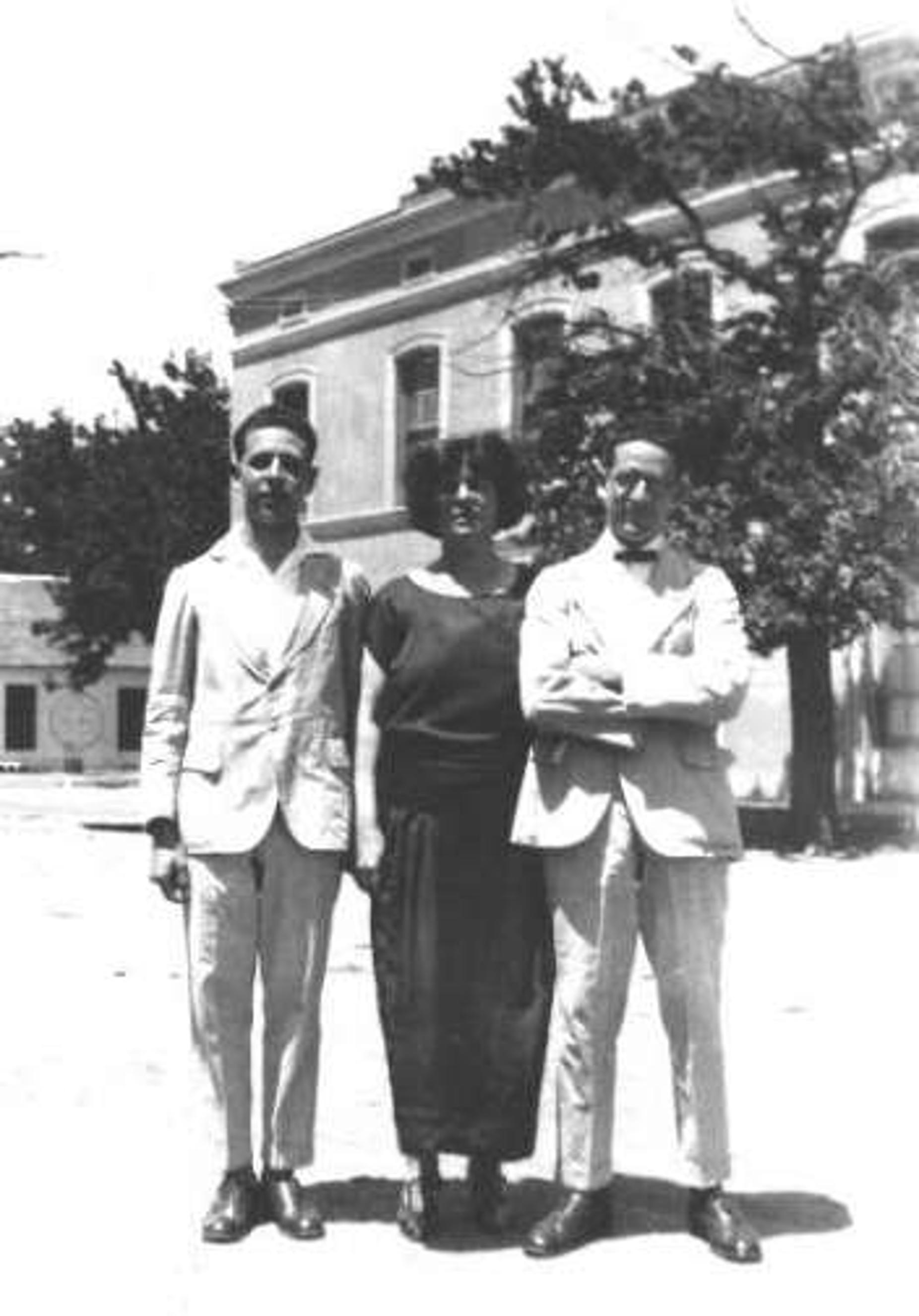
- Josef Marais with his parents in South Africa
- Born: Joseph Pessach; November 17, 1905; Sir Lowry's Pass Village, Western Cape, South Africa
- Died: April 27, 1978 (aged 72); Los Angeles, California
- Other name: Joseph Pessac
- Occupations: Singer, songwriter
- Spouses: Nance Elizabeth (m. 1934); Roosje Baruch de la Bardo (m. 1947)

Josef Marais (born Joseph Pessach; November 17, 1905 – April 27, 1978) was a folk singer and songwriter from South Africa who based himself in Britain, and then the United States, where he achieved notability. He performed with his wife as a duo called Marais and Miranda.

== Early life ==
Marais was born to Jewish immigrants in Sir Lowry's Pass Village, a suburb of Cape Town, in 1905. His birth name was Joseph Pessach; due to the antisemitic climate in the 1920s, he decided to use the name Josef Marais.

== Career ==
Marais left South Africa in the 1920s to study violin and viola in Europe, finally settling in London, where he studied at the Royal Academy of Music.

He toured as a concert violinist for several years, and when he heard that His Master's Voice was eager to record songs in Afrikaans for the South African market, he offered his services. Marais made a number of these recordings for HMV from 1930 to 1931, with more coming between 1935 and 1936.

The successful recordings were heard by the BBC, who approached Marais with the request that he translate and perform the songs for British audiences. These broadcasts were heard by the British representative of NBC, and Marais was invited to New York in 1939 to do a radio show for NBC.

During World War II, he worked at the U.S. Office of War Information. In 1945, he started singing with Roosje Baruch de la Bardo, a Dutch Jewish refugee who had fled the Nazis in Holland, and worked at the Office of War Information as a linguist. In time, they became a team and she adopted the stage name Miranda. They were married in 1947 and performed for more than 30 years as Marais and Miranda, recording many South African traditional folk ballads, and original songs such as "Zulu Warrior".

Several of their songs achieved popularity when recorded by high-profile American recording artists, such as "Sugar Bush" (a duet between Doris Day and Frankie Laine), "A-round the Corner (Beneath the Berry Tree)" (by Jo Stafford) and "Ma Says, Pa Says" (a duet between Doris Day and Johnnie Ray).

Marais compositions recorded by other artists during this era included "(We're All Invited To) Henrietta's Wedding" and "Cross My Heart, Madame" by Champ Butler, "The Cherries" by Doris Day, "Chow, Willy" by Laine and Stafford duetting, "How Lovely Cooks the Meat" by Laine and Day duetting, "Over the Mountain" by Percy Faith and his Orchestra and Chorus, "Counting Sheep" by Peggy King and "I'll Stay in the House" by Jimmy Boyd.

== Personal life and death ==
Marais married Nance Elizabeth on October 16, 1934, in Paris, France. He went on to marry Rosa de Miranda on July 22, 1947, in California.

He died at Daniel Freeman Memorial Hospital in Inglewood, Los Angeles, California, in 1978, aged 72. He was survived by his wife, Miranda, son, Marcel de Miranda, and daughter, Yvonne de Miranda.

== Legacy ==
In 2023, a musical about Marais and Miranda, Ver in die Wêreld Kittie ("Far in the World Kittie"), premiered at the Klein Karoo Nasionale Kunstefees in Oudtshoorn, South Africa.

== Partial discography ==
=== Marais & Miranda ===
- Josef Marais and his Bushveld Band - Songs of the South African Veld (Decca DLP 5014 10")
- Josef Marais and his Bushveld Band - Songs from the Veld (Decca DLP 5083 10")
- Josef Marais and Miranda - Songs Of Many Lands (Decca DL 5106 10")
- Marais and Miranda - In Person Vol.1 (Decca DL 9026)
- Marais and Miranda - In Person Vol.2 (Decca DL 9027)
- Marais and Miranda - Christmas with Marais and Miranda (Decca DL 9030)
- Marais and Miranda - Africana Suite and Songs of Spirit and Humor (Decca DL 9047)
- Josef Marais and Miranda - Revisit the South African Veld (Decca DL 8811)
- Josef Marais and Miranda - South African Folk Songs (Harmony HL 7043)
- Marais and Miranda - No Dolly No and Other Rare Folk Songs (MGM E4143)
- Marais and Miranda - Nature Songs (Motivation Records MR 0318)
- Marais and Miranda - More Nature Songs (Motivation Records MR 0320)
- Marais and Miranda - Souvenir Album (Glendale GLS6022)
