= Hymns (Tennessee Ernie Ford album) =

Studio album by Tennessee Ernie Ford
- Released: 1957
- Genre: Gospel
- Label: Capitol
- Producer: Lee Gillette

Tennessee Ernie Ford chronology
This Lusty Land! (1955)	Hymns (1957)	Ol' Rockin' Ern (1957)

Professional ratings
Review scores
Source	Rating
The Encyclopedia of Popular Music	3/5 stars
The Rolling Stone Album Guide	3/5 stars

Hymns is a 1956 studio album by Tennessee Ernie Ford, released in 1957. It was the second-best-selling record in the United States in 1957. The album is one of the best selling of all time, and spent 277 weeks on the Billboard 200. The album was re-recorded in stereo in 1962 and assigned the catalog number ST 756, while the original 1957 mono recording remained in the Capitol catalog as T 756.

The album appeared the same year that Ford launched his 5-year NBC television series, The Ford Show, Starring Tennessee Ernie Ford. He closed each episode with a hymn.

== Track listing ==
=== Side 1 ===
1. "Who At My Door Is Standing"
2. "Rock of Ages"
3. "Softly and Tenderly"
4. "Sweet Hour of Prayer"
5. "My Task"
6. "Let the Lower Lights Be Burning"

=== Side 2 ===
1. "The Ninety and Nine"
2. "The Old Rugged Cross"
3. "When They Ring the Golden Bells"
4. "In the Garden"
5. "Ivory Palaces"
6. "Others"
