= Slow Poke =

Single by Pee Wee King
- B-side: "Whisper Waltz"
- Released: July 1951
- Recorded: March 4, 1951
- Genre: Country
- Length: 3:00
- Label: RCA Victor
- Songwriter: Chilton Price

Pee Wee King singles chronology
"Tennessee Waltz" (1951)	"Slow Poke" (1951)	"Silver and Gold" (1952)

"Slow Poke" is a 1951 popular song.

== Background ==
"Slow Poke" is credited to three writers: Pee Wee King, Redd Stewart, and Chilton Price. Actually Price wrote the song in 1951, as she thought the song described her friend, King, very well. King recorded the song and Stewart did the vocal. Price gave rights to the other two in exchange for publicity, as she felt she knew nothing about the music distribution business. The song did so well commercially that when Price wrote the song "You Belong to Me" the next year, she felt she could do better by ceding partial credit for authorship to King and Stewart than trying to publicize the song on her own, so that song as well was credited to King, Stewart, and Price, though Price was the sole author.

== Pee Wee King recording ==
Pee Wee King's recording was issued by RCA Victor as catalog number 21-0489 (78 rpm) and 48-0489 (45 rpm). It first entered the Billboard magazine Best Seller chart on October 21, 1951, and lasted 22 weeks, peaking at #3. It was his only crossover from the country genre to score on the pop chart. It appeared on the country charts on September 21, 1951, for 31 weeks, peaking at #1 and remaining there for 15 weeks. Outside the US, topped the Australian charts in May 1952.

== Other recorded versions ==
- As "Slow Poke":
  - A Hawkshaw Hawkins version was released by King Records (USA) as catalog number 998, reached #7 on the country charts, having first charted on December 8, 1951. It lasted 4 weeks on the charts. The song also reached #26 on the pop charts.
  - The Ray Conniff Singers (1964)
  - In 1951, the recording by Ralph Flanagan and his orchestra with vocals by The Singing Winds was issued by RCA Victor on 78 rpm as catalog number 21-4373 and 45 rpm as 47-4373. It first appeared on the Billboard magazine Best Seller chart on January 18, 1952, for 2 weeks and peaked at #29.
  - The next-best-known version was the recording by Arthur Godfrey, which was released by Columbia Records as catalog number 39632. It entered the Billboard magazine Best Seller chart on December 28, 1951, for 11 weeks, peaking at #12. The song was one side of a two-sided hit; the flip side, "Dance Me Loose," also reached #12.
  - Tiny Hill's version was released by Mercury Records as catalog number 5740. It entered the Billboard magazine Best Seller chart on January 4, 1952, at #30, in its only week on the chart.
  - A version by Roberta Lee was issued by Decca Records, catalog number 27792, entered the Billboard magazine Best Sellers chart on December 7, 1951, and lasted 4 weeks on the chart, where it peaked at #28.
  - Helen O'Connell released her recording on Capitol Records as catalog number 1837. It first appeared on the Billboard magazine Best Seller chart beginning December 7, 1951, and lasted 11 weeks, peaking at #16.
  - Jimmie Rodgers for his album No One Will Ever Know (1962)
- In the United Kingdom the song was called "Slow Coach." The lyric was changed to fit the British title. Pee Wee King also recorded a version with that title. The major British versions recorded by Johnny Brandon and the Ray Ellington Quartet.

Other who recorded the song as "Slow Coach":

  - Dyd Dean
  - Dinah Kaye
  - The Radio Revellers (1951)
  - Semprini with Rhythm Acc. Recorded in London on March 24, 1952, as the first melody of the medley "Dancing to the piano (No. 14) - Part 1. Hit Medley of Foxtrots" along with "Cry" and "Unforgettable". It was released by EMI on the His Master's Voice label as catalog number B 10263.
  - Yet another recording made by Pee Wee King used the title "Slow Bloke" (and appropriate lyric changes). This would seem to have been made for the British market ("bloke" being a British word), but since all other British versions (and the previously mentioned King recording) use the title "Slow Coach", the actual reason for this recording is unclear. The record may have been intended for the Australian market, where bloke is a common appellation.
- As "Punk":
  - Doris Day (1955)

== Samples ==
- This song was sampled for the song "Punk" by British singer Red Face in 2007.

== See also ==
- Billboard Top Country & Western Records of 1952
