= Rainbow Ranch (Nashville, Tennessee) =

Historic home in Nashville, Tennessee

- U.S. National Register of Historic Places
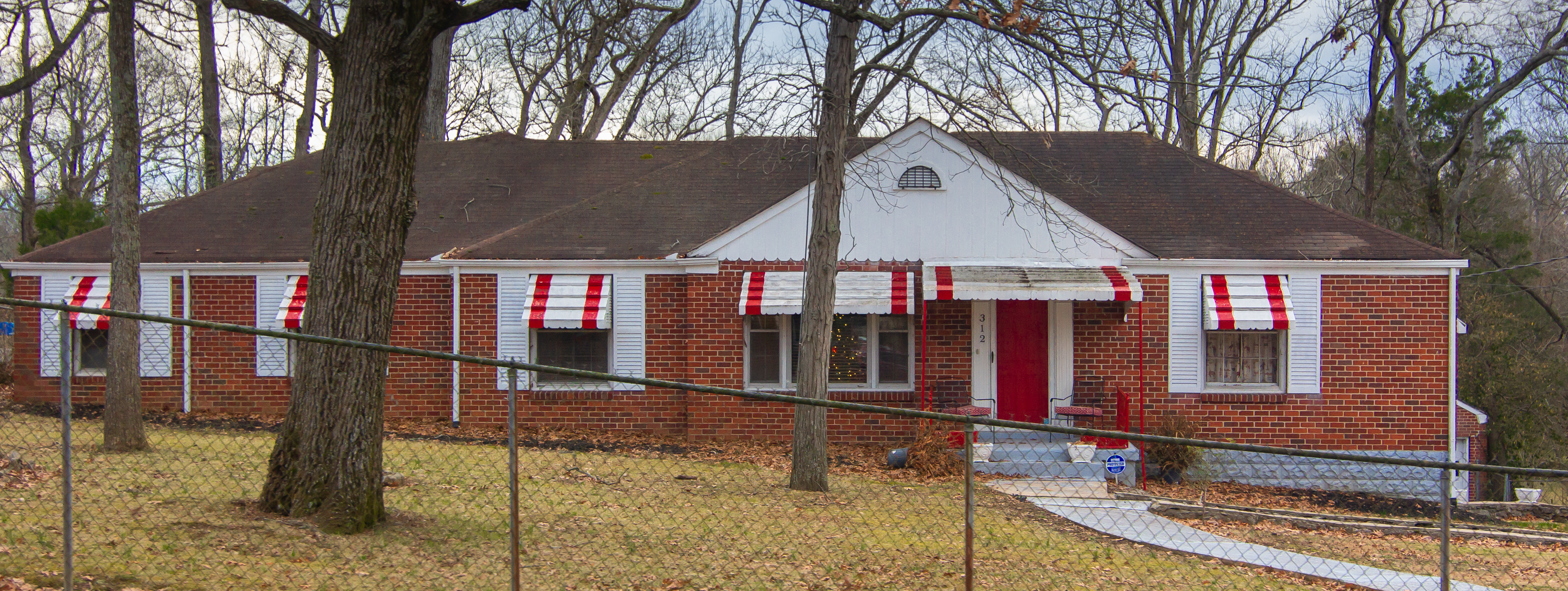
- Rainbow Ranch (2021)

- Location within Tennessee Location within the United States
- Location: 312 E Marthona Rd. Madison, Tennessee 37115
- Coordinates: 36.260556°N 86.728056°W
- Built: 1951
- Website: hanksnowsranch.com
- NRHP reference No.: 100003154
- Added to NRHP: November 27, 2018

Rainbow Ranch is a ranch home located in Madison, Tennessee. The property was listed on the National Register of Historic Places listings in Davidson County, Tennessee (NRHP) on November 27, 2018.

== History ==
Canadian American musician Hank Snow lived in the Rainbow Ranch. He died on December 20, 1999 at the ranch in Madison, Tennessee. Snow bought the home shortly after he experienced success with his song, "I'm Movin' On." He named the home 'Rainbow Ranch' after his band, which was known as the "Rainbow Ranch Boys". In recent years the home has been restored by Snow's family.

== Description ==
The home is 3,800 ft (1,200 m) and the walls are covered in knotty pine. Snow also built a "Rainbow Ranch barn" on the property for his horse Shawnee. The home also features a recording studio.
