= Ernie Sings & Glen Picks =

Studio album by Tennessee Ernie Ford & Glen Campbell
- Released: May 1975
- Recorded: 1975
- Studio: Capitol (Hollywood)
- Genre: Country
- Label: Capitol
- Producer: Steve Stone

Glen Campbell chronology
Live in Japan (1975)	Ernie Sings & Glen Picks (1975)	Rhinestone Cowboy (1975)

Professional ratings
Review scores
Source	Rating
Allmusic	3/5 stars

Ernie Sings & Glen Picks is an album by singer Tennessee Ernie Ford and singer/guitarist Glen Campbell, released in 1975.

== Track listing ==
Side 1:

1. "Trouble in Mind" (Richard M. Jones) – 3:02
2. "(I'd Be) A Legend in My Time" (Don Gibson) – 2:31
3. "Here Comes My Baby Back Again" (Dottie West, Bill West) – 2:52
4. "There Goes My Everything" (Dallas Frazier) – 2:55
5. "She Called Me Baby" (Harlan Howard) – 3:03

Side 2:

1. "Gotta Get My Baby Back" (Floyd Tillman) – 3:40
2. "Nobody Wins" (Kris Kristofferson) – 2:52
3. "Loving Her Was Easier" (Kris Kristofferson) – 3:02
4. "I Really Don't Want to Know" (Music – Don Robertson; Lyrics – Howard Barnes) – 2:48
5. "For the Good Times" (Kris Kristofferson) – 3:38

== Personnel ==
- Ernie Ford – lead vocals
- Glen Campbell – acoustic guitars, harmony vocals
- Chuck Domanico – bass fiddle

== Production ==
- Producer – Steve Stone
- Engineer – Hugh Davis
- Photography – Rick Rankin
