= The Shotgun Boogie =

Single by Tennessee Ernie Ford
- B-side: "I Ain't Gonna Let It Happen No More"
- Written: 1949
- Released: January 1950
- Recorded: 1949
- Genre: Western swing, rockabilly
- Length: 2:37
- Label: Capitol
- Songwriter: Tennessee Ernie Ford
- Producer: Lee Gillette

"The Shotgun Boogie" is a 1950 song by Tennessee Ernie Ford. "The Shotgun Boogie" was Tennessee Ernie Ford's most successful release on the Rockabilly & Western Swing charts, staying on the charts for a total of twenty-five weeks, and at number one for fourteen weeks. Ford, a hunter himself, wrote the song. Jazz bandleader Cab Calloway covered the song.

Preceded by "The Golden Rocket" by Hank Snow	Best Selling Retail (Country & Western) Records; January 20, 1951	Succeeded by "There's Been a Change in Me" by Eddy Arnold
