= Hot Rod Race =

- 1950 Gilt-Edge release

Single by Arkie Shibley and His Mountain Dew Boys
- Released: November 1950
- Genre: Western swing
- Label: Gilt-Edge
- Songwriter: George Wilson (credited)

"Hot Rod Race" is a Western swing song about a fictional street race between hot rod customized cars in California, first recorded by Arkie Shibley, and released in November 1950. The comical lyrics relate a night-time race between a custom Ford and a Mercury, from the perspective of the Ford's driver. The race begins outside San Pedro and the drivers race through many towns, evading the police, before both cars are finally overtaken by a faster driver, "a kid in a hopped-up Model A".

With its hard driving boogie woogie beat and talking blues vocals, "Hot Rod Race" is sometimes named as one of the first rock and roll songs. It also broke new ground in tapping into hot rod and street racing culture, their terminology and slang. Its popularity inspired a series of hot rod songs and fast car songs from other artists and genres recorded for the car culture of the 1950s and '60s.

== History ==
The writing of the song was credited to George Wilson, but some sources suggest that it was in fact the work of George's 17-year-old son, Ron Wilson. George Wilson took the song to Shibley, who in turn took it to Bill McCall, owner of 4 Star Records in Pasadena, California. After McCall turned it down, Shibley recorded and released it on his own Mountain Dew label, but after it started to become popular McCall reconsidered and reissued the recording on the 4 Star subsidiary label, Gilt-Edge. Released as Gilt-Edge 5021, and credited to Arkie Shibley and His Mountain Dew Boys, it became a national hit, staying on the charts for seven weeks, peaking at number five in 1951. More polished cover versions were soon recorded on major labels by Ramblin' Jimmie Dolan (Capitol), Red Foley (Decca), and Tiny Hill (Mercury). Hill's version reached number seven on the Country chart and number 29 on the pop chart.

Shibley's record may have climbed higher and outpaced any of the others, but his second verse opened up with:

Now along about the middle of the night
We were ripping along like white folks might.

Eastern radio stations, never a fan of Western swing anyway, refused to play it. Dolan changed the verse to say "plain folks"; Hill to "rich folks"; and Foley to "poor folks".

== Legacy ==
"Hot Rod Race" prompted the even more successful answer song "Hot Rod Lincoln", a hit for Charlie Ryan (recorded 1955 and 1959, charted 1960, No. 33 pop), Johnny Bond (1960, No. 26 pop) and Commander Cody (1972, No. 9 pop). Shibley's record also directly influenced Chuck Berry's "Maybellene", Gene Vincent's "Race With The Devil", and the succession of hot rod records by the Beach Boys and others in the early 1960s.
