= Jimmie Dolan =

American singer-songwriter

Ramblin' Jimmie Dolan
- Also known as: America's Cowboy Troubador
- Born: Lee Roy Petit; October 29, 1916; Gardena, California, U.S.
- Died: July 31, 1994 (aged 77) Riverside Co., California, U.S.
- Genres: Western swing
- Occupation: Musician
- Instruments: Vocals, Guitar
- Years active: 1938-1957
- Labels: Capitol

Lee Roy Pettit (October 29, 1916 – July 31, 1994), known professionally as Ramblin' Jimmie Dolan, was a Western swing musician born in Gardena, California. He is best remembered for his hit single, "Hot Rod Race" on Capitol Records, which reached No. 7 on the Billboard country chart in February 1951. Dolan himself wanted to be remembered for his contributions in entertaining troops in the Pacific Theatre, especially the Philippines during World War II. He reached the rank of Chief Petty Officer filling the function of a radioman. He returned from the war with a ready built fan base and his charisma soon had him in demand at dance halls throughout the west. During the 1940s he hosted and played on numerous radio stations. In the early 1950s he was a pioneer of television in the Seattle area where he was the general manager of its first television station as well as one of its stars. He had a television show for children as well as an adult variety show, for which he won the award for Best Western TV show of 1951. He then had a long running radio show in San Francisco. On an airline flight he met United Airlines Stewardess Charline Bales, a graduate of the University of Idaho. They were married for 13 years. He is survived by a daughter, Patricia and a granddaughter Aria. During the late 1980s he was contacted by the former president of his fan club, recently widowed. They met again, both being free and lived happily together until his death.
