= Arkie Shibley =

American singer-songwriter

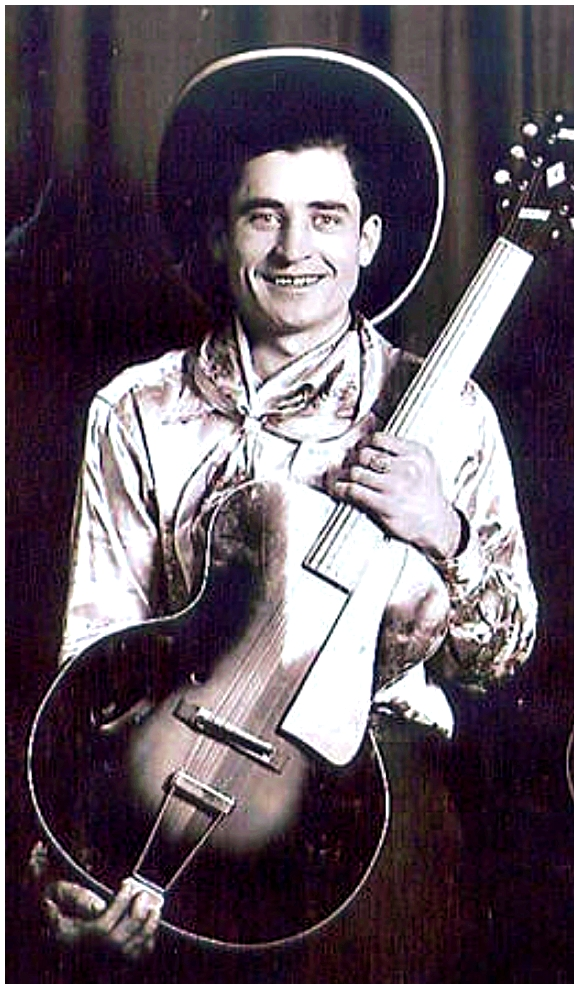

Background information
- Born: Jesse Lee Shibley; September 21, 1915; Van Buren, Arkansas, U.S.
- Died: September 7, 1975 (aged 59) Van Buren, Arkansas
- Genres: Western swing
- Occupation: Musician
- Instruments: Vocals, guitar
- Years active: 1940s – 1950s
- Labels: 4 Star (Gilt-Edge)

Jesse Lee "Arkie" Shibley (September 21, 1915 – September 7, 1975), was an American country singer who recorded the original version of "Hot Rod Race" in 1950. The record was important because "it introduced automobile racing into popular music and underscored the car's relevance to American culture, particularly youth culture."

== Biography ==
Shibley was born in Van Buren, Arkansas, United States, in 1915. After working as a cattle farmer and relocating, he acquired the nickname "Arkie" (widely used for people from Arkansas) and, around 1948, began hosting a regular country music show on radio station KBRG in Bremerton, Washington. Self-taught on guitar, he formed a group, the Mountain Dew Boys, who made their first recordings for a small label in California in the late 1940s.

In 1950, Shibley recorded the song "Hot Rod Race", suggested to him by George Wilson, who was credited but according to some sources was the father of the actual songwriter, 17-year-old Ron Wilson. Shibley offered the song to 4 Star Records in Los Angeles, but was turned down, and Shibley decided to release the song on his own Mountain Dew label. The record was credited to Arkie Shibley and his Mountain Dew Boys, who included Leon Kelley on lead guitar, Jackie Hayes on bass and banjo, and Phil Fregon on fiddle.

The record became popular, and McCall decided to reissue it on 4 Star's Gilt Edge imprint. Shibley's record raced into the country charts in January 1951, peaking at No. 5, with cover versions on major labels by Ramblin' Jimmie Dolan on Capitol, Red Foley on Decca and Tiny Hill on Mercury. The Hill version also crossed over to the pop charts (No. 29).

In 1951 Shibley recorded four sequels to his hit, all performed in a Woody Guthrie-like talking blues style: "Hot Rod Race # 2", "Arkie Meets the Judge (Hot Rod Race # 3)", "The Guy in the Mercury (Hot Rod Race # 4)" and "The Kid in the Model A (Hot Rod Race # 5)". He subsequently left the recording business, and returned to live in Arkansas. He died in Van Buren, Arkansas, in 1975.
