= I Wanna Play House With You =

"I Wanna Play House With You" is a 1951 song by Eddy Arnold, written by Cy Coben. The song went to number one on the Country & Western Best Seller lists for six weeks and a total of twenty-four weeks on the chart. The B-side of "I Wanna Play House With You", entitled, "Something Old, Something New" (also a Coben composition) peaked at number seven on the same chart.

The Buddy Holly song "I Wanna Play House With You", although sometimes credited to Coben, is a different song, a version of the song "Baby Let's Play House" by Arthur Gunter. It was the Gunter version which Elvis Presley covered. Presley altered the line " You may have religion..., to "You may have a pink Cadillac...".
