= Kentucky Waltz =

1946 song performed by Bill Monroe

"Kentucky Waltz" is a 1946 song written and performed by Bill Monroe. The song was Bill Monroe's most successful release on the Country & Western charts peaking at number three.

== Cover versions ==
- In 1951 Eddy Arnold recorded his version of the song which reached number one on the Country & Western Best Seller charts.
- Also in 1951, a version by Rosemary Clooney went to #24 on the Cashbox pop chart.

== See also ==
- List of Billboard number-one country songs of 1951
