= Pee Wee King =

American country music songwriter and recording artist (1914–2000)

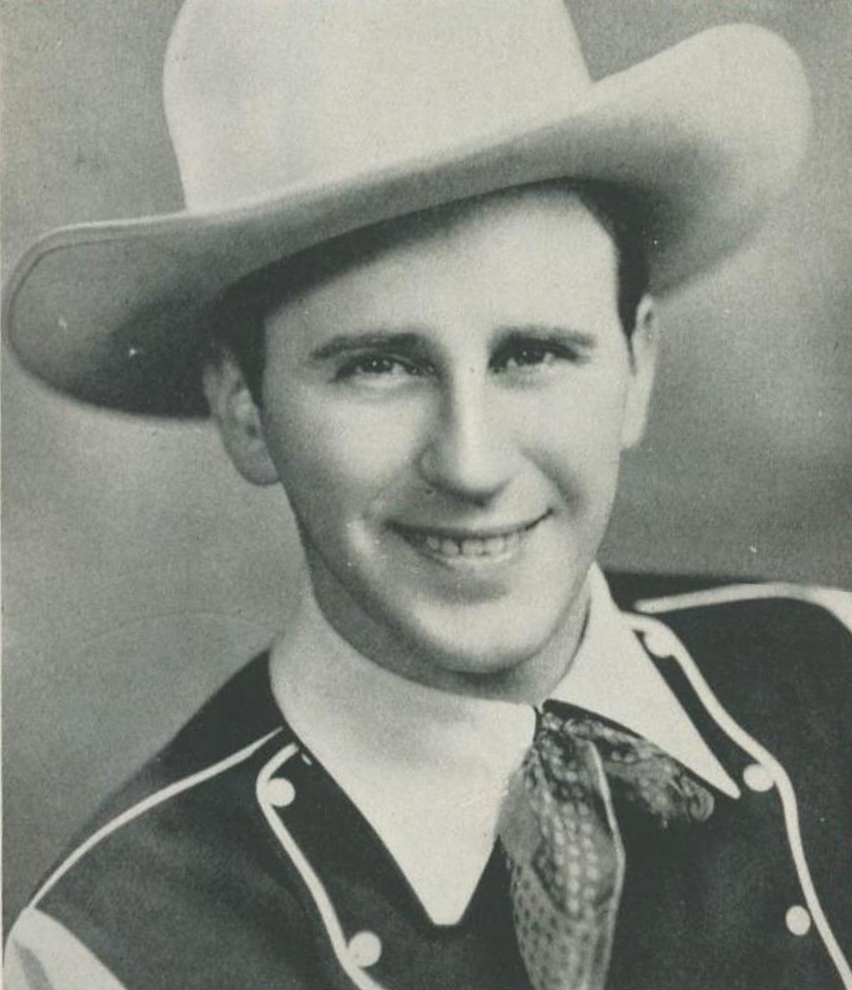
- Pee Wee King c. 1944

Background information
- Born: Julius Frank Anthony Kuczynski; February 18, 1914; Abrams, Wisconsin, United States
- Died: March 7, 2000 (aged 86) Louisville, Kentucky, United States
- Genres: Country
- Occupation: Singer-songwriter
- Instruments: Accordion, fiddle
- Years active: 1930s–1969

Julius Frank Anthony Kuczynski (February 18, 1914 – March 7, 2000), known professionally as Pee Wee King, was an American country music songwriter and recording artist best known for co-writing "Tennessee Waltz".

Pee Wee King is credited with bringing the musicians union to the Grand Ole Opry; he was one of the first musicians in Nashville to carry a union card and to have the members of his band be part of the union. He also served on the board of the Country Music Hall of Fame.

== Life and career ==
King was born in Abrams, Wisconsin, to a Polish-American family, and lived in Abrams during his youth. He learned to play the accordion from his father, who was a professional polka musician. In the 1930s, he toured and made cowboy movies with Gene Autry. King joined the Grand Ole Opry in 1937, with the help of his father-in-law J.L. Frank.

In 1946, while he was the bandleader of the Golden West Cowboys, King, together with the band's vocalist, Redd Stewart, composed "The Tennessee Waltz", inspired by "The Kentucky Waltz" by bluegrass musician Bill Monroe. King and Stewart first recorded "The Tennessee Waltz" in 1948. It went on to become a country-music standard, due mainly to the immense success of Patti Page's version of the song.

King had the Pee Wee King Show on WAVE-TV in Louisville, Kentucky, in 1949, with the Golden West Cowboys and announcer Bob Kay. The half-hour program was broadcast at 7:15 pm on Mondays. In 1955, he hosted a 90-minute ABC network summer series with the same name. This musical variety show, which originated from the Cleveland studios of WEWS-TV, again featured the Golden West Cowboys, along with vocalist Redd Stewart, comedienne Little Eller Long, and singer Neal Burris. The show also featured square dancing and was broadcast on Mondays at 9:00 pm, airing from May 23 to September 5, 1955.

King wrote or co-wrote more than 400 songs and recorded more than 20 albums and 157 singles. His other songs included "Slow Poke" and "You Belong to Me", both co-authored with Chilton Price and Redd Stewart. His songs introduced waltzes, polkas, and cowboy songs to country music. King became one of the charter members of the Nashville Songwriters Hall of Fame in 1970.

King was not permitted to use the drummer and trumpeter he featured in his stage shows when the band played on the Grand Ole Opry, where both instruments were banned. He ignored that ban only once, appearing at the Ryman in April 1945 following the death of Franklin Delano Roosevelt. The Opry had been canceled, but since a number of fans showed up, management decided to have King perform his stage show for them, performing as he did outside the Opry. He used his full band, with drums and trumpet. When confronted about it afterward, King told Opry emcee George D. Hay that he had done his stage show, as asked. Bob Wills had defied the Opry ban on drums a year earlier during a 1944 guest appearance.

His band also introduced on-stage dancing and Nudie Cohn's customized "rhinestone cowboy" outfits (Nudie suits), which later became popular with Nashville and country musicians, including Elvis Presley, to the Opry. He was inducted into the Country Music Hall of Fame in 1974.

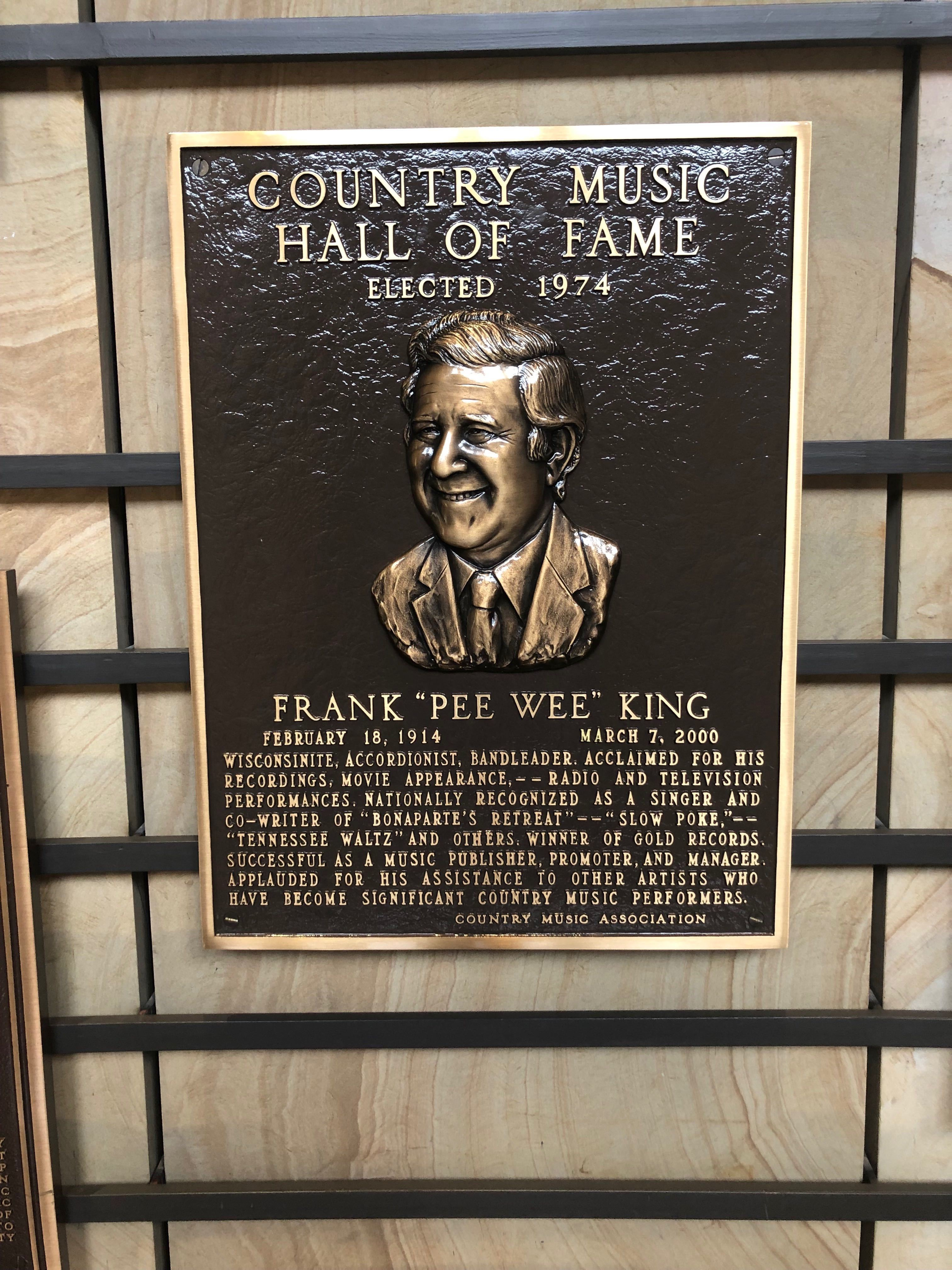
Pee Wee King's Country Music Hall of Fame Plaque located in the Hall of Fame Rotunda in Nashville, Tennessee

He joined producers Randall Franks and Alan Autry for the In the Heat of the Night cast CD Christmas Time's a Comin' performing "Jingle Bells" with the cast released on Sonlite and MGM/UA for one of the most popular Christmas releases of 1991 and 1992 with Southern retailers.

He died of a heart attack in Louisville, Kentucky, at age 86.

== Discography ==
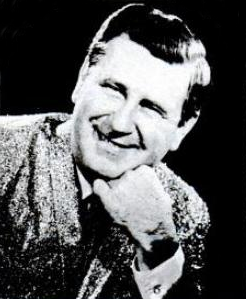
Pee Wee King in 1970

=== Albums ===
- Pee Wee King, RCA Victor, 1954
- Waltzes, RCA Victor, 1955
- Swing West, RCA Victor, 1956
- Country Barn Dance, RCA Camden, 1965
- Ballroom King, Detour, 1982
- Hog Wild Too!, Zu Zazz, 1990
- Pee Wee King and His Golden West Cowboys (6-CD box set), Bear Family, 1995
- Pee Wee King's Country Hoedown (live radio performances), Bloodshot, 1999

=== Singles ===
| Year | Single | Chart Positions | |
| Year | Single | US Country | US |
|---|---|---|---|
| 1948 | "Tennessee Waltz" | 3 | |
| 1949 | "Tennessee Tears" | 12 | |
| 1949 | "Tennessee Polka" | 3 | |
| 1950 | "Bonaparte's Retreat" | 10 | |
| 1951 | "Tennessee Waltz" (re-release) | 6 | |
| 1951 | "Slow Poke" | 1 | 1 |
| 1952 | "Silver and Gold" | 5 | 18 |
| 1952 | "Busybody" | 8 | 27 |
| 1954 | "Changing Partners" | 4 | |
| 1954 | "Bimbo" | 9 | |
| 1954 | "Backward, Turn Backward" | 15 | |
