= A-round the Corner (Beneath the Berry Tree) =

1952 song

Single by Jo Stafford
- B-side: "Heaven Drops Her Curtain Down"
- Published: February 1952 by Frank Music Corp
- Released: February 22, 1952
- Recorded: December 10, 1951
- Genre: Traditional pop
- Length: 2:34
- Label: Columbia
- Songwriters: Traditional, adapted by Josef Marais

"A-round the Corner (Beneath the Berry Tree)", also titled "Ay-round the Corner (Bee-hind The Bush)" or "A-round the Corner (Be-neath The Berry Tree)", is a traditional popular song adapted by Josef Marais, from the repertoire of Marais and Miranda. The title was first published in February 1952, but an earlier version was registered in August 1940. The most popular recording was made by Jo Stafford on 10 December 1951 with accompaniment by her partner Paul Weston and the Norman Luboff Choir. It was issued on Columbia 39653 and entered the Billboard chart in March 1952, peaking at number nine, also making number 12 on the Cash Box chart. A recording by The Weavers and Gordon Jenkins on Decca charted in April and reached number 19.

In the UK, the song entered the chart based on sheet music sales in April, and reached number one in May, holding the top spot for three weeks. Both the recordings by Stafford and The Weavers were available in the UK, alongside versions by British artists the Stargazers, Edmundo Ros and the Tanner Sisters.
