= Tennessee Waltz =

1947 song by Pee Wee King and Redd Stewart

Single by Pee Wee King and His Golden West Cowboys
- A-side: Rootie Tootie
- Published: February 26, 1948 by Acuff-Rose Publications, Inc., Nashville
- Released: January 26, 1948
- Recorded: December 2, 1947
- Studio: RCA Victor Studio A (Chicago, Illinois)
- Genre: Country
- Length: 2:57
- Label: RCA Victor 20-2680
- Composer: Pee Wee King
- Lyricist: Redd Stewart
- Producer: Stephen H. Sholes

Pee Wee King and His Golden West Cowboys singles chronology
"Quit Honkin' That Horn" (1947)	"Tennessee Waltz" (1948)	"The Waltz of Regret" (1948)

"Tennessee Waltz" is an American popular country music song with lyrics by Redd Stewart and music by Pee Wee King written in 1946 and first released in January 1948. The song became a multimillion seller via a 1950 recording – as "The Tennessee Waltz" – by Patti Page.

All versions of the lyrics narrate a situation in which the narrator introduces their sweetheart to a friend who then waltzes away with her or him. The lyrics are altered for pronoun gender on the basis of the gender of the singer.

The popularity of "Tennessee Waltz" made it the fourth official song of the state of Tennessee in 1965. Page's recording was inducted into Grammy Hall of Fame in 1998.

== Composition and early recordings ==
Pee Wee King, Redd Stewart, and their fellow Golden West Cowboys members were en route to Nashville "close to Christmas in 1946" when King and Stewart, who were riding in a truck carrying the group's equipment, heard Bill Monroe's new song "Kentucky Waltz" on the radio. Stewart had an idea to write a Tennessee waltz using the melody of King's theme song: "No Name Waltz", and wrote the lyrics on a matchbox as he and King thought up the words. King and Stewart presented "Tennessee Waltz" to music publisher Fred Rose the next day, and Rose adjusted one line in the bridge of Stewart's lyric from "O the Tennessee waltz, O the Tennessee Waltz," to "I remember the night and the Tennessee Waltz."

Almost a year passed before Pee Wee King's Golden West Cowboys were able to record "Tennessee Waltz". Their recording, made on December 2, 1947 at the RCA Victor Studio in Chicago was released as Victor (20–2680) the following month. 300,000 copies were sold for this release.

Acuff-Rose Music, the publisher, did not immediately register a copyright to the song when it was presented to the company by King and Stewart and did not obtain the "consummate proof of ownership, and the key to protecting a songwriter's property" until February 1948.

A version by Cowboy Copas, a former member of the Golden West Cowboys was released by King Records (King 696) two months later in March 1948. 80,000 copies were sold.

Both singles became Top Ten C&W hits – the chart was then known as "Best Selling Folk Retail Records" – in the spring and summer of 1948 with respective peaks of No. 3 (Pee Wee King's Golden West Cowboys) and No. 6 (Cowboy Copas).

== Patti Page version ==
"The Tennessee Waltz"

Single by Patti Page
- A-side: "Boogie Woogie Santa Claus" (initial release)
- B-side: "Long, Long Ago" (reissue)
- Released: November 1950
- Recorded: November 1950
- Genre: Pop
- Length: 3:06
- Label: Mercury
- Composer: Pee Wee King
- Lyricist: Redd Stewart
- Producer: Mitch Miller

Patti Page singles chronology
"So in Love" (1950)	"The Tennessee Waltz" (1950)	"Would I Love You" (1951)

The most successful version of the song was recorded by Patti Page. In October 1950, an R&B version by Erskine Hawkins was released and reviewed on Billboard, and the reviewer Jerry Wexler brought the song to the attention of Page's manager, Jack Rael, and suggested that the song could be a hit for Page. Page and Rael listened to Hawkins' version, and proceeded to record the song quickly despite lacking an arrangement for the song. Page cut "The Tennessee Waltz" in a November 1950 session in New York City with Rael conducting his orchestra: her vocal was cut multitracked with three voices, two voices, and a single voice, and Page herself selected the two-voice multitracked vocal on the released single.

Patti Page's recording was originally intended to serve as an obscure B-side to "Boogie Woogie Santa Claus" (Catalog# 5534), as the label Mercury Records was more interested in the seasonal single at that time of the year. However, it was "The Tennessee Waltz" that became a hit. After the initial pressings "Boogie Woogie Santa Claus" was replaced as the B-side by "Long Long Ago".

"The Tennessee Waltz" entered the Pop Music chart of Billboard dated November 10, 1950 for a 30-week chart run, peaking at number one on the December 30, 1950 chart, and remained at number one for a total of nine weeks. A No. 2 C&W hit, "The Tennessee Waltz" became Page's career record. On the Cash Box charts, "Tennessee Waltz" reached No. 1 on December 30, 1950, with the Patti Page, Jo Stafford, Guy Lombardo and Les Paul/Mary Ford versions being given a single ranking; as such "Tennessee Waltz" remained No. 1 in Cash Box through the February 3, 1951 chart. The song was also ranked No. 1 in England for multiple weeks.

Page's recording was reported to have sold 2.3 million copies by May 1951. Page's recording also inspired many other versions, and 4.8 million copies were sold for the various major versions combined, in addition to 1.8 million copies of sheet music sold, which made the song likely the most successful song in the history of pop music up to 1951 in the US. In Japan, the song was the biggest-selling song ever as of 1974.

The song was later included on Page's 1957 Mercury album This Is My Song. It was also re-recorded (in stereo, and with a different arrangement) for her 1966 Columbia Records album Patti Page's Greatest Hits. In 2024, the single was added to the National Recording Registry by the Library of Congress as being "culturally, historically, and/or aesthetically significant".

=== Charts ===
Chart (1950–51)	Peak position
US Billboard Best Selling Pop Singles	1
US Billboard Most played Juke Box Folk (Country & Western) Records	2
US Cash Box Best Selling Singles	1

== Other contemporary versions ==
The success of the Patti Page version led to covers by Les Paul with Mary Ford (Capitol 1316) and Jo Stafford (Columbia 39065) both of which reached the Top Ten – Stafford's at No. 7 and Paul/Ford at No. 6 (the latter was a double-sided hit with "Little Rock Getaway" reaching number 18). Also in 1951, the version by Guy Lombardo and his Royal Canadians (Decca 27336) reached No. 6 in the US. Guy Lombardo's version sold nearly 600,000 copies while Les Paul sold 500,000 copies by May 1951.

The Fontane Sisters made their first solo recording cutting "Tennessee Waltz" in a November 1950 session at RCA Victor Studios in New York City; the track would reach the Top 20 in 1951. In addition, the original version – credited to Pee Wee King – was re-released to reach No. 6 C&W in 1951. A further 100,000 copies were sold in addition to the 300,000 copies sold in the previous release.

Spike Jones and his City Slickers recorded a parody featuring a duet with singers sporting Yiddish accents, and this version reached No. 13 in January 1951. A version by Anita O'Day and the All Stars Top Songs reached No. 24.

Other recordings were made by Petula Clark for the UK market, and by Chiemi Eri for the Japanese market.

== Later recordings ==
Ivo Robić recorded "Tennessee Waltz" for his 1957 album Cowboyske Pjesme ("Cowboy Songs").

"Tennessee Waltz" returned to the charts in the fall of 1959 with a rockabilly version recorded by both Bobby Comstock & the Counts and Jerry Fuller: on the Billboard Hot 100 the versions respectively reached No. 52 and No. 63 while Cash Box assigned both versions a joint ranking on its Top 100 Singles chart with a peak position of No. 42. The two versions were co-charted in Canada reaching No. 13.

In 1962, Damita Jo had a non-charting single release of "Tennessee Waltz". Patsy Cline also recorded The Tennessee Waltz for Decca records in 1962.

In 1964, "Tennessee Waltz" was recorded in a rock and roll ballad style by Alma Cogan; this version was No. 1 in Sweden for five weeks and also reached No. 14 in Denmark while a German language rendering (with lyrics by Theo Hansen) reached No. 10 in Germany. Cogan's version served as template for the arrangement of the 1974 Danish-language rendering "Den Gamle Tennessee Waltz" by Birthe Kjær which spent 17 weeks in the Top Ten of the Danish hit parade with a two-week tenure at No. 1 also spending an additional eight weeks at No. 2. The arrangement of Cogan's version was also borrowed for remakes of "Tennessee Waltz" by Swedish singers Kikki Danielsson (Wizex (on the 1978 album Miss Decibel)) and Lotta Engberg (on the 2000 album Vilken härlig dag) and – with the German lyrics – by Heidi Brühl, Gitte, Renate Kern and Ireen Sheer.

Sam Cooke recorded a double-time version of "Tennessee Waltz" for his Ain't That Good News album recorded January 28, 1964 at the RCA Studio in Hollywood. Released 1 March 1, 1964, Ain't That Good News would be the final album release of new material by Cooke, and "Tennessee Waltz", coupled with another album track: "Good Times", would be the final Sam Cooke single released during the singer's lifetime, with "Tennessee Waltz", the original B-side, becoming sufficiently popular to chart at No. 35. Cooke performed "Tennessee Waltz" – and also "Blowin' in the Wind" – as a guest on the premiere of Shindig! broadcast September 16, 1964. The October 1964 live album release Sam Cooke at the Copa also features "Tennessee Waltz".

Ray Brown & the Whispers had a No. 4 hit in Australia in 1966 with a rockabilly version of "Tennessee Waltz" released as "Tennessee Waltz Song".

In 1966, Otis Redding recorded a version of "Tennessee Waltz" featuring Booker T & the MGs on his R&B album, Complete & Unbelievable: The Otis Redding Dictionary of Soul cut at the Stax Studio in Memphis, Tennessee: Redding was familiar with "Tennessee Waltz" from the album Sam Cooke at the Copa.

Manfred Mann included a version of the song on their number-one EP in 1966.

David Bromberg includes a live version on his 1972 album, Demon in Disguise, on Columbia Records.

Lacy J. Dalton recorded "Tennessee Waltz" for her 1979 self-titled debut album recorded at CBS Studio in Nashville, Tennessee: issued as a single in 1980 Dalton's reworking of the song reached No. 18 on the C&W – the sole C&W charting of "Tennessee Waltz" since 1951.

Other artists who have recorded "Tennessee Waltz" (with the parent album) include: LaVern Baker (Woke Up This Mornin' 1993), Pat Boone (I'll See You in My Dreams/ 1962), Eva Cassidy (Imagine/ 2002), Holly Cole (Don't Smoke in Bed 1993), Connie Francis (Country & Western Golden Hits/ 1959), Emmylou Harris (Cimarron 1981), Tom Jones backed by The Chieftains (Long Black Veil 1995), (1995), Pete Molinari (Today, Tomorrow and Forever 2009), Anne Murray (Let's Keep It That Way 1978), Elvis Presley, Billie Jo Spears (Country Girl 1981), Lenny Welch, Kitty Wells (Kitty's Choice/ 1960), Dottie West (Feminine Fancy/ 1968), Margaret Whiting (Margaret/ 1958), Broadway's Kerry Conte and Mike Rosengarten (An Evening With... Vol. 1/ 2019).

Kelly Clarkson performed the song at the 2013 Grammy Awards as part of a tribute to Patti Page.

== Other performances ==
The University of Tennessee Pride of the Southland Band performs Tennessee Waltz at the end of each home game at Neyland Stadium and Thompson–Boling Arena in Knoxville as the fans are filing out of those venues. East Tennessee State University's Marching Bucs perform the song during their pregame show. After every home game, the Appalachian State University Marching Mountaineers and the Middle Tennessee State University Band of Blue perform the song during their post-game show. Baylor University's Golden Wave Band plays the song at the end of each home game, a tradition possibly begun with a request from former head coach Grant Teaff. The Tennessee Waltz is also the corps song of Music City Drum and Bugle Corps, a Drum Corps International World Class corps from Nashville. The UTC Marching Mocs perform the Tennessee Waltz during their pregame show.

== Use in media ==
The song was also used in an instrumental form in the final scenes of the film Primary Colors where Jack Stanton dances with his wife at his Inauguration Ball. It was also used briefly during the 1983 drama film, The Right Stuff. John Huston's 1979 Wise Blood, an adaptation of a Flannery O'Connor novel, uses an instrumental version during the opening montage and as a recurrent musical theme throughout the picture. Also at the beginning of the French movie Les Cowboys (2015), the song was played by François Damiens. Patti Page's version features in Zabriskie Point. The song is also featured in Schitt's Creek, season 1 episode 12, "Surprise Party" and in the 1999 Japanese film Poppoya. In season 2 episode 11, "Triangle" of the original TV series Dallas it is faintly heard being played during a cocktail party. In the TV show M*A*S*H (season 5, episode 21), Colonel Potter has the camp sing along to the song during a movie night.

== See also ==
- Love triangle
