= The Golden Rocket =

Single by Hank Snow
- B-side: "Paving the Highway with Tears"
- Released: 1950
- Recorded: 1950
- Genre: Country
- Length: 2:47
- Label: RCA Victor
- Songwriter: Clarence E. Snow

Hank Snow singles chronology
"I'm Moving On" (1950)	"The Golden Rocket" (1950)	"The Rhumba Boogie" (1951)

"The Golden Rocket" is a 1950 single by Hank Snow. "The Golden Rocket" was his follow-up release to "I'm Movin' On", and spent two weeks on the Country & Western Best Seller list and a total of twenty-three weeks on the chart.

The song likely references the Golden Rocket, a proposed passenger train of the Rock Island Railroad.
