= The Rhumba Boogie =

Song by Hank Snow (The Singing Ranger) and his Rainbow Ranch Boys
- B-side: "You Pass Me By"
- Released: January 1951
- Genre: Country
- Label: RCA Victor 48-0431
- Songwriter: Clarence E. Snow

"The Rhumba Boogie" is a 1951 song written and originally performed by Hank Snow.

== Chart performance ==
The single was his follow up to "The Golden Rocket". "The Rhumba Boogie" was Hank Snow's third number one in a row on the Country & Western Best Seller chart where it stayed at the top for eight weeks and a total of twenty-seven weeks on the chart.

== Cover versions ==
- The song was also recorded by Spade Cooley & his Fiddlin' Friends (DECCA 9–46310) with a vocal by Ginny Jackson, and released in March 1951.
