= Tennessee Ernie Ford =

American singer and TV personality (1919–1991)

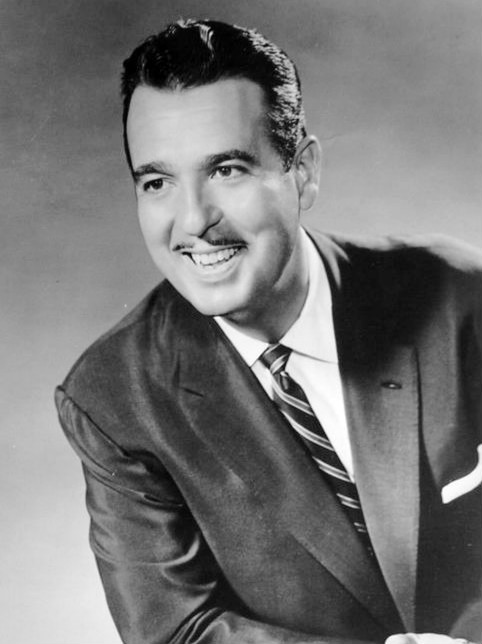
- Ford in 1957

Background information
- Born: Ernest Jennings Ford; February 13, 1919; Bristol, Tennessee, US
- Died: October 17, 1991 (aged 72) Reston, Virginia, US
- Genres: Country; pop; gospel
- Occupations: Musician; actor
- Instruments: Vocals; acoustic guitar; harmonica; piano
- Years active: 1949–1991
- Labels: Capitol Records, Word Records
- Formerly of: Eddy Arnold; Dean Martin; Glen Campbell; Johnny Cash; Kay Starr

Ernest Jennings Ford (February 13, 1919 – October 17, 1991), known professionally as Tennessee Ernie Ford, was an American singer and television host who enjoyed success in the country and western, pop, and gospel musical genres. Noted for his rich bass-baritone voice and down-home humor, he is remembered for his hit recordings of "The Shotgun Boogie" and "Sixteen Tons".

== Biography ==
=== Early years ===
Ford was born in Bristol, Tennessee, United States, to Maud (née Long) and Clarence Thomas Ford. He was descended from Southern Unionists during the American Civil War, but also quite possibly from a Confederate soldier too. He spent much of his time in his early years listening to country or western musicians, in person or on the radio.

Ford began wandering around Bristol, Tennessee, in his high school years, taking an interest in radio and began his radio career as an announcer at WOPI in 1937, being paid 10 dollars a week. In 1938, the young bass-baritone left the station and went to study classical music at the Cincinnati Conservatory of Music in Ohio. He returned for the announcing job in 1939 and did it from 1939 to 1941 in stations from Atlanta, Georgia, to Knoxville, Tennessee. A first lieutenant, he served in the United States Army Air Corps in World War II as the bombardier on a B-29 Superfortress, but the war ended before he was to be sent to Japan. He was also a bombing instructor at George Air Force Base, in Victorville, California.

After the war, Ford worked at radio stations in San Bernardino and Pasadena, California. At KFXM, in San Bernardino, Ford was hired as a radio announcer. He was assigned to host an early morning country music disc jockey program, Bar Nothin' Ranch Time. To differentiate himself, he created the personality of "Tennessee Ernie", a wild, madcap, exaggerated hillbilly. He became popular in the area and was soon hired away by Pasadena's country radio station KXLA. He also did musical tours. The Mayfield Brothers of West Texas, including Smokey Mayfield, Thomas Edd Mayfield, and Herbert Mayfield, were among Ford's warmup bands, having played for him in concerts in Amarillo and Lubbock, during the late 1940s.

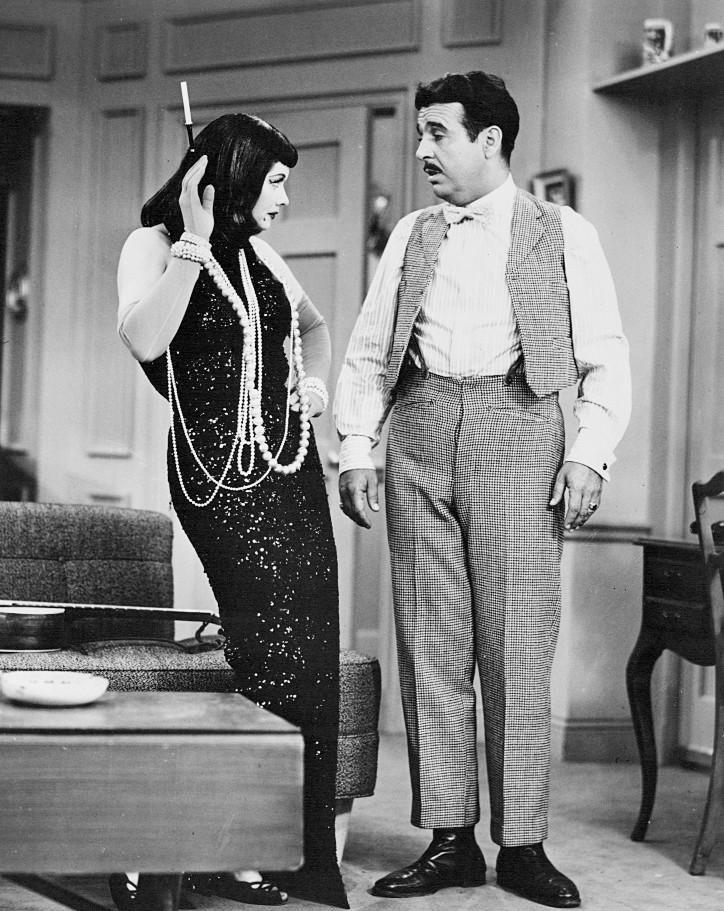
Ford appeared as "Cousin Ernie" in three episodes of I Love Lucy in 1954 and 1955. He is pictured here with Lucille Ball from his first episode "Tennessee Ernie Visits" (1954).

At KXLA, Ford continued doing the same show and also joined the cast of Cliffie Stone's popular live KXLA country show Dinner Bell Roundup as a vocalist while still doing the early morning broadcast. Cliffie Stone, a part-time talent scout for Capitol Records, brought him to the attention of the label. In 1949, while still doing his morning show, he signed a contract with Capitol. He became a local TV star as the star of Stone's popular Southern California Hometown Jamboree show. RadiOzark produced 260 15-minute episodes of The Tennessee Ernie Show on transcription disks for national radio syndication.

He released almost 50 country singles through the early 1950s, several of which made the Billboard charts. Many of his early records, including "The Shotgun Boogie" and "Blackberry Boogie", were exciting, driving boogie-woogie records featuring accompaniment by the 'Hometown Jamboree' band, which included Jimmy Bryant on lead guitar and pioneer pedal steel guitarist Speedy West. "I'll Never Be Free", a duet pairing Ford with Capitol Records pop singer Kay Starr, became a huge country and pop crossover hit in 1950. A duet with Ella Mae Morse, "False Hearted Girl" was a top seller for the Capitol Country and Hillbilly division.

Ford eventually ended his KXLA morning show and in the early 1950s, moved on from Hometown Jamboree. He took over from bandleader Kay Kyser as host of the TV version of NBC quiz show College of Musical Knowledge when it returned briefly in 1954 after a four-year hiatus. He became a household name in the U.S., largely as a result of his portrayal of "Cousin Ernie" in the I Love Lucy episodes "Tennessee Ernie Visits", "Tennessee Ernie Hangs On" (both 1954), and "Tennessee Bound" (1955). In 1955, Ford recorded "The Ballad of Davy Crockett" (which reached number 4 on the country music chart) with "Farewell to the Mountains" on the B-side.

=== "Sixteen Tons" cover version success ===
Sixteen Tons album cover

Ford scored an unexpected hit on the pop chart in 1955 with his rendering of "Sixteen Tons", a sparsely arranged coal-miner's lament. Merle Travis had first recorded it in 1946. It reflected experiences of the Travis family in the mines at Muhlenberg County, Kentucky. The song's fatalistic tone and bleak imagery were in stark contrast to some sugary pop ballads and rock & roll also on the charts in 1955:

You load sixteen tons, what do you get?
Another day older and deeper in debt.
Saint Peter, don't you call me, 'cause I can't go;
I owe my soul to the company store...

With Ford's snapping fingers and a unique clarinet-driven pop arrangement by Ford's music director, Jack Fascinato, "Sixteen Tons" spent ten weeks at number one on the country chart and seven weeks at number one on the pop chart. The record sold over two million copies, and was awarded a gold disc. The song made Ford a crossover star, and became his signature song.

=== The Ford Show ===
Ford subsequently hosted his own prime-time variety program, The Ford Show, which ran on NBC television from October 4, 1956, to June 29, 1961. Ford's last name allowed the show title to carry a unique double entendre by selling the naming rights to the Ford Motor Company (Ford had no known relation to the Ford family who founded that company). The Ford Theatre, an anthology series also sponsored by the company, had run in the same time slot on NBC in the preceding 1955–1956 season. Ford's program was notable for the inclusion of a religious song at the end of every show, a tradition he recalled during his days as a cast member on Cliffie Stone's Hometown Jamboree live radio and TV show. Ford insisted on ending with a hymn on his own show despite objections from network officials and the ad agency representing Ford, who feared it might provoke controversy. Everyone relented after the hymns received overwhelmingly favorable viewer response. The hymn became the most popular segment of his show. He earned the nickname "The Ol' Pea-Picker" due to his catchphrase, "Bless your pea-pickin' heart!" He began using the term during his disc jockey days on KXLA.

=== Later years ===
In 1956, he released Hymns, his first gospel music album, which remained on Billboard's Top Album charts for 277 consecutive weeks; his album Great Gospel Songs won a Grammy Award in 1964 and was nominated for several others. After the NBC show ended, Ford moved his family to Portola Valley in northern California. He also owned a cabin near Grandjean, Idaho, on the upper South Fork of the Payette River, where he would regularly retreat. In 1961, he recorded two albums of American Civil War songs, one for songs of the Union and another for songs of the Confederacy.

From 1962 to 1965, Ford hosted a daytime talk/variety show, The Tennessee Ernie Ford Show (later known as Hello, Peapickers) from KGO-TV in San Francisco, broadcast over the ABC television network. In 1968, Ford narrated the Rankin/Bass Thanksgiving TV special The Mouse on the Mayflower for NBC. The mouse narrator seen at the beginning of the special, William the Churchmouse, was a caricature of Ford, in keeping with a Rankin/Bass tradition. Ford was the spokesman for the Pontiac Furniture Company in Pontiac, Illinois, in the 1970s. He also became the spokesman for Martha White brand flour in 1972.

Although he left his own TV show, he went on other shows like Hee Haw in the 1970s, The Dolly Show, and on Barbara Mandrell and the Mandrell Sisters in the early 1980s.

Ford left Capitol Records in 1975. By that time, the quality of his country albums had become uneven and none of his releases were selling well. He would never record for a major label again.

Ford's experiences as a navigator and bombardier instructor in World War II led to his involvement with the Confederate Air Force (now the Commemorative Air Force), a war plane preservation group in Texas. He was a featured announcer and celebrity guest at the annual CAF Airshow in Harlingen, Texas, from 1976 to 1988. He donated a once-top-secret Norden bombsight to the CAF's B-29 bomber restoration project. In the late 1970s, as a CAF colonel, Ford recorded the organization's theme song "Ballad of the Ghost Squadron".

Over the years, Ford was awarded three stars on the Hollywood Walk of Fame, for radio, records, and television. He was awarded the Presidential Medal of Freedom in 1984, and was inducted into the Country Music Hall of Fame in 1990.

Out of the public eye, Ford and wife Betty contended with serious alcohol problems; Betty had the problem since the 1950s, as well as emotional issues that complicated both their lives and the lives of their sons. Though his drinking began to worsen in the 1960s, he worked continuously, seemingly unaffected by his heavy intake of whiskey. By the 1970s, however, it had begun to take an increasing toll on his health, appearance, and ability to sing, though his problems were not known publicly. After Betty took her own life in 1989 because of prescription drug abuse, Ernie's liver problems, diagnosed years earlier, became more apparent, but he refused to reduce his drinking despite repeated doctors' warnings. His last interview was taped on September 23, 1991, by his long-time friend Dinah Shore for her TV show, and was later aired on December 4 that year.

Ford received posthumous recognition for his gospel music contributions by being added to the Gospel Music Association's Gospel Music Hall of Fame in 1994.

== Personal life ==
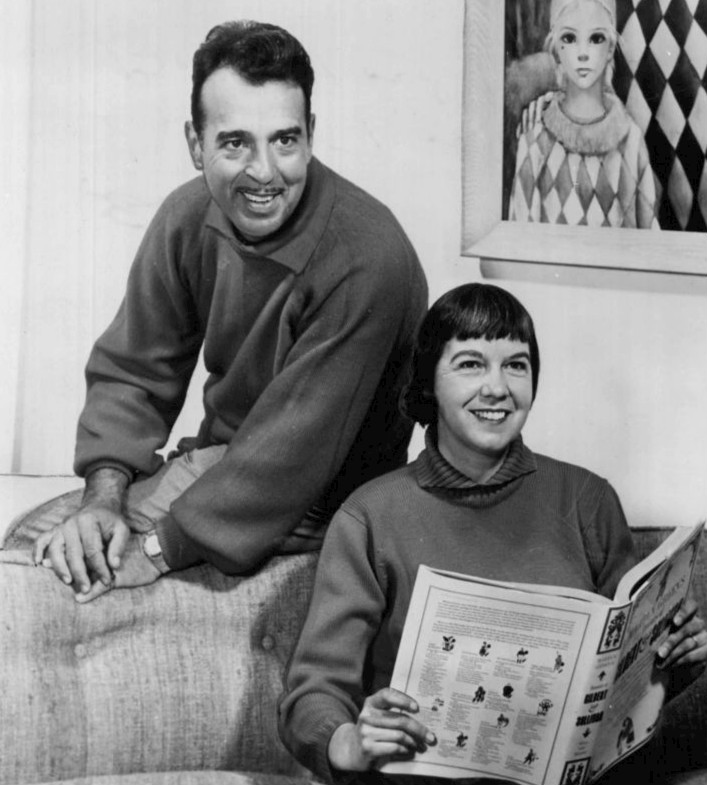
Ernie and Betty Ford at home in 1962

Ford was married to Betty Heminger from September 18, 1942, until her death on February 26, 1989. They had two sons: Jeffrey Buckner "Buck" Ford (born 1950), who died on June 21, 2026 in Nashville, Tennessee; and Brion Leonard Ford (born 1952, in San Gabriel, California), who died on October 24, 2008, in White House, Tennessee, of lung cancer, aged 56. In 1980, Ford lived in the Smoke Tree neighborhood of Palm Springs, California.

Less than four months after Betty's death in 1989, Ford married again. On September 28, 1991, he suffered severe liver failure at Dulles Airport, shortly after leaving a state dinner at the White House, hosted by President George H. W. Bush.

Grave

Ernie Ford died in the HCA Reston Hospital Center, of Reston, Virginia, on October 17, 1991. His body was interred at the Alta Mesa Memorial Park in Palo Alto, California.

His second wife, Beverly Wood Ford (1921–2001), died ten years after Ernie; her body was interred along his.

Ford was a member of the Pi Kappa Alpha fraternity, the Epsilon Zeta chapter at East Tennessee State University, as well as the Bohemian Club.

== Discography ==
Albums

- This Lusty Land! (1956)
- Hymns (1956)
- Spirituals (1957)
- Ford Favorites
- Ol' Rockin' Ern'
- Nearer the Cross (1958)
- The Star Carol (1958)
- Gather 'Round (1959)
- A Friend We Have (1959)
- Sing a Hymn with Me (1960)
- Sixteen Tons (1960)
- Sing a Spiritual with Me (1960)
- Come to the Fair (1960)
- Civil War Songs of the North (1961)
- Civil War Songs of the South (1961)
- Looks at Love (1961)
- Hymns at Home (1961)
- Mississippi Showboat (1962)
- I Love to Tell the Story (1962)
- Book of Favorite Hymns (1962)
- Long, Long Ago (1963)
- We Gather Together (1963)
- Story of Christmas (1963)
- Great Gospel Songs (1964)
- Country Hits Feelin' Blue (1964)
- World's Best Loved Hymns (1964)
- Let Me Walk with Thee (1965)
- Sing We Now of Christmas (1965)
- My Favorite Things (1966)
- Wonderful Peace (1966)
- God Lives (1966)
- Bless Your Pea Pickin' Heart (1966)
- Aloha (1967)
- Faith of Our Fathers (1967)
- Our Garden of Hymns (w/ Marilyn Horne) (1968)
- World of Pop and Country Hits (1968)
- O Come All Ye Faithful (1968)
- The Best of Tennessee Ernie Ford Hymns (1968)
- Songs I Like to Sing (1969)
- New Wave (1969)
- Holy, Holy, Holy (1969)
- America the Beautiful (1970)
- Everything Is Beautiful (1970)
- Abide with Me (1971)
- C-H-R-I-S-T-M-A-S (1971)
- Folk Album (1971)
- Mr. Words and Music (1972)
- Standin' in the Need of Prayer (1972)
- Country Morning (1973)
- Ernie Ford Sings About Jesus (1973)
- Make A Joyful Noise (1974)
- Ernie Sings & Glen Picks (w/ Glen Campbell) (1975)
- Sing His Great Love (1976)
- For the 83rd Time (1976)
- He Touched Me (1977)
- Swing Wide Your Golden Gate (1978)
- Ramblin' Down Country Roads With Tennessee Ernie Ford (1979)
- Tell Me the Old, Old Story (1980)
- There's A Song In My Heart (1982)
- "Back Where I Belong" (1982)
- Sunday School Songs For Children of All Ages (1983)
- Keep Looking Up (1984)
- 6000 Sunset Boulevard: Featuring The Billy Liebert Band (2009)
