= Redd Stewart =

American singer-songwriter (1923–2003)

Background information
- Born: Henry Ellis Stewart; May 27, 1923; Ashland City, Tennessee, U.S.
- Died: August 4, 2003 (aged 80) Louisville, Kentucky, U.S.
- Genre: Country
- Occupation: Singer-songwriter
- Instruments: Fiddle; banjo; piano; guitar

Henry Ellis Stewart (May 27, 1923 – August 4, 2003), better known as Redd Stewart, was an American country music songwriter and recording artist who co-wrote "Tennessee Waltz" with Pee Wee King in 1948.

== Biography ==
He was born in Ashland City, Tennessee, United States. While still a child, his family moved to Louisville, Kentucky. At an early age, he learned to play several musical instruments such as the banjo, piano, fiddle and guitar. He changed his first name to Redd because of his red hair and complexion. His talent was not only as a musician but also as a songwriter, beginning by writing a little jingle for a Louisville car dealer's commercial.

In 1937, he joined the Golden West Cowboys band headed by Pee Wee King with lead singer Eddy Arnold. Stewart served in the South Pacific in World War II, attaining the rank of sergeant. He wrote "Soldier's Last Letter" while in still in the South Pacific, which became a hit record in 1944 for Ernest Tubb. After he returned to the U.S., he again hooked up with King's band, this time as the lead singer after Arnold went solo. Stewart teamed up with King in writing many top 10 country hits starting with "Tennessee Waltz", proclaimed by Governor Frank Clement in 1965 as the Tennessee state song; and "You Belong To Me". He appeared in several movies with Pee Wee King, including Gold Mine in the Sky (1938), Ridin' the Outlaw Trail (1951) and The Rough, Tough West (1952), the last two starring Charles Starrett as the Durango Kid. In 1961, Redd and King appeared in the movie, Hoedown. In 1950–51, Stewart signed with King Records as a solo vocalist, though none of his singles were successful.

Stewart also wrote songs that would be made famous by other artists. He provided Jim Reeves with "That's a Sad Affair", (Reeves also recorded "You Belong to Me") and Moon Mullican with "Downstream" and "When Love Dies Where Does it Go" in the mid-1950s. "Tennessee Waltz" went on to be a hit for Patti Page and was also covered by Roy Acuff, the Louvin Brothers, Jerry Lee Lewis, Elvis Presley and many others. "You Belong to Me" also went on to become a major standard. The lesser known "Slow Poke", originally recorded by King, was covered by Hawkshaw Hawkins.

In 1972, he was inducted as a charter member into the Nashville Songwriters Hall of Fame.

On August 2, 2003, Stewart died at 80 at Baptist Hospital East in Louisville, from complications of injuries due to a fall in the early 1990s.

== Legacy ==
In 2004, "Tennessee Waltz" was awarded BMI's 3,000,000 Airplay Award. (equivalent to 17.1 years of continuous playing), an honor shared with Barry Manilow's "I Write the Songs", Frank Sinatra's "My Way", Hank Williams's "Your Cheatin' Heart", Elvis Presley's "Love Me Tender" and Roger Miller's "King of the Road". In 2004, he was inducted into Country Legends Hall of Fame and the Traditional Country Music Hall of Fame; and in 2005, Tennessee Waltz Parkway opened in his birthplace, Ashland City.
