= You Belong to Me (1952 song) =

1952 song by Chilton Price, Pee Wee King, Redd Stewart

Single by Jo Stafford with Paul Weston and his Orchestra
- B-side: "Pretty Boy (Pretty Girl)"
- Published: April 21, 1952 by Ridgeway Music, inc., Hollywood, Calif.
- Released: July 18, 1952
- Recorded: June 24, 1952
- Studio: Radio Recorders, Los Angeles, California
- Genre: Ballad; traditional pop
- Length: 3:06
- Label: Columbia 25734
- Songwriters: Chilton Price; Pee Wee King; Redd Stewart

"You Belong to Me" is a popular music ballad from the 1950s. It is well known for its opening line, "See the pyramids along the Nile". (Note: Dean Martin's recording of the song switched the order of the first two lines, beginning with "Watch the sunrise on a tropic isle".) The song was published in Hollywood on April 21, 1952, and the most popular version was by Jo Stafford, reaching No. 1 on both the UK and US singles charts.

== Conception and composition ==
"You Belong to Me" is credited to Chilton Price, Pee Wee King, and Redd Stewart.

Price, a songwriting librarian at WAVE Radio Louisville, had written the song in its virtual entirety as "Hurry Home to Me", envisioning the song as an American woman's plea to a sweetheart serving overseas in World War II. Afforded songwriting credit on the song mostly in exchange for their work in promoting it, King and Stewart did slightly adjust Price's composition musically and lyrically, shifting the focus from a wartime background "into a kind of universal song about separated lovers" (World War II having ended some years previously) and changing the title to "You Belong to Me". Price had previously had success with another hit she had written, "Slow Poke", under a similar arrangement with the two men.

== Chart performance ==
The first recording of the song, in February 1952, was by Joni James. She had seen the sheet music in the Woods Building in Chicago, and the lyrics attracted her. She recorded the song in Chicago, and it was released in March on the local Sharp Records label. After she signed to MGM, it was reissued as her second single on that label on August 5, 1952, after Jo Stafford, Patti Page, Ella Fitzgerald and Dean Martin had covered it. James' version was also issued on MGM Records for national distribution. The best-known version of the song in early 1952 was recorded after James, by Sue Thompson on Mercury's country label as catalog number 6407. It was soon covered by Patti Page, whose version was issued by Mercury (catalog number 5899), with "I Went to Your Wedding" (a bigger Page hit, reaching No. 1) on the flip side. It entered the Billboard chart on August 22, 1952, and lasted 12 weeks on the chart, peaking at No. 4. A cover version by Dean Martin, released by Capitol Records (catalog number 2165), was also in play at that time. This version first entered the US chart on August 29, 1952, and remained on it for 10 weeks, reaching No. 12. All the versions were combined in the rankings on the Cash Box charts, and the song reached No. 1 on those charts as well, lasting on the chart for more than half a year.

In the UK, the song also topped the sheet music sales chart. It first entered the chart on November 1, 1952, peaking at No. 1 on December 27, where it stayed for 7 weeks. Jo Stafford's recording was amongst the first batch to be issued in October 1952. British cover versions were also available by Larry Cross, Alma Cogan with Jimmy Watson (trumpet), Monty Norman, Dickie Valentine with Ted Heath and his Music, Victor Silvester and his Ballroom Orchestra, Jimmy Young, and Wally Fryer and his Perfect Tempo Dance Orchestra. American recordings by Patti Page, Grady Martin and his Slew Foot Five (vocal by Cecil Bayley), Dean Martin, Joni James, Ken Griffin (organ), Jan Garber and his Orchestra (vocal by Roy Cordell) and Mickey Katz (a Yiddish parody) and his Orchestra were available in the UK. In all, the song remained in the sheet music chart for 24 weeks. Despite the many recordings issued in the UK, only that by Stafford appeared in the singles sales chart.

"You Belong to Me"

Single by The Duprees
- B-side: "Take Me As I Am"
- Released: June 1962
- Recorded: 1962
- Genre: Doo-wop
- Length: 2:39
- Label: Coed
- Songwriters: Chilton Price, Pee Wee King, Redd Stewart

The Duprees singles chronology
"You Belong to Me" (1962)	"My Own True Love" (1962)

A cover version by Jo Stafford became the most popular version. It was recorded on June 24, 1952, when she was several months pregnant. Stafford's husband, Paul Weston, produced the record and provided orchestral accompaniment. Issued by Columbia Records as catalog number 39811, it was Stafford's biggest hit, topping the charts in both the United States and the United Kingdom (the first song by a female singer to top the UK Singles Chart). The single first entered the US chart on August 1, 1952, and remained there for 24 weeks.

The Stafford version appeared in the first ever UK singles chart of November 14, 1952 (then a top 12) and reached number 1 for a single week on January 16, 1953, its tenth week on chart. It thus became only the second record to top the chart, and remained on it for a total of 19 weeks.

Stafford re-recorded "You Belong to Me" twice, both in the 1960s. The first of these later recordings was made on January 13, 1963, and issued in January 1964 on a stereo Capitol LP, The Hits of Jo Stafford. On May 14, 1969, another recording was made, issued by Reader's Digest on a various-artists box set, They Sing The Songs.

== Other notable versions ==
- A version by the Duprees made the Billboard Top 10, reaching No. 7 in 1962.
- Patsy Cline released a version on August 7, 1962, as part of her Sentimentally Yours album, the final album released before her fatal plane crash less than a year later.
- Ringo Starr recorded a version on his 1981 album "Stop and Smell the Roses".
- Anne Murray recorded a version of the song for her album Croonin' (1993).
- A version by Bob Dylan was included on the soundtrack for the film Natural Born Killers, which also includes sampled dialogue from the film.
- Jason Wade recorded a cover of the song, which was used in the 2001 movie Shrek. Wade's version was also included in the soundtrack for the film.
- A version recorded by voice actress Courtnee Draper in character as Elizabeth Comstock is heard twice in the video game BioShock Infinite: Burial at Sea; once at a game location, and again during the closing credits.

== See also ==
- List of number-one singles from the 1950s (UK)
- List of number-one singles of 1952 (U.S.)
