= Hank Snow =

Canadian musician (1914–1999)

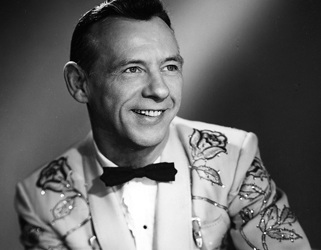
- Hank Snow publicity photo 1963

Background information
- Also known as: Hank, The Yodeling Ranger; Hank Snow, The Singing Ranger
- Born: Clarence Eugene Snow; May 9, 1914; Brooklyn, Nova Scotia, Canada
- Died: December 20, 1999 (aged 85) Madison, Tennessee, U.S.
- Genre: Country
- Occupations: Singer; songwriter; composer; musician
- Instruments: Vocals, guitar
- Years active: 1936–1999
- Label: RCA Victor

Clarence Eugene "Hank" Snow (May 9, 1914 – December 20, 1999) was a Canadian-American country music guitarist, singer, and songwriter. He recorded 140 albums and charted more than 85 singles on the Billboard country charts between 1950 and 1980. Snow had success on country music record charts with his songs including: "I'm Moving On", "The Golden Rocket", "The Rhumba Boogie", "I Don't Hurt Anymore", "Let Me Go, Lover!", "I've Been Everywhere", and "Hello Love".

Hank Snow wrote songs about a wide range of topics including joy, freedom, travel, anguish, and love. His work was often inspired by his personal experiences, such as his childhood in a small town in rural Nova Scotia. He experienced extreme poverty, abuse, and physically punishing labor during the Great Depression. His mother encouraged him to pursue his dream of becoming an entertainer like his idol, country star Jimmie Rodgers.

Snow received various music awards and is a member of the Country Music Hall of Fame, the Canadian Country Music Hall of Fame, and the Canadian Music Hall of Fame. The Hank Snow Home Town Museum in Liverpool, Nova Scotia, is dedicated to his life and work.

== Early life ==
Clarence Eugene "Hank" Snow was born on May 9, 1914 in the small community of Brooklyn in Queens County, Nova Scotia, to George Snow (1886–1966) and Maude Marie Hatt (1889–1953). He was the fifth of six children, of whom the two eldest died in infancy. His parents were married on November 10, 1909, in Liverpool, Nova Scotia. In his autobiography, Snow describes his parents' struggle to feed their four remaining children during hard financial times. His father worked for low pay as a foreman in sawmills, often far from home, while his mother helped support the family by washing clothes and scrubbing floors. Both parents showed musical talent. Snow said his father loved to sing, and described his mother as an accomplished singer who played piano during silent films at the local theatre and sometimes performed in minstrel shows. She also enjoyed playing her pump organ.

Snow's parents legally separated when he was eight, and the local Overseer of the Poor decided he and his siblings should be taken from their mother due to her financial difficulties. One sister moved in with an aunt while the other two were sent to separate foster homes. Snow went to live with his paternal grandmother, who forbade him from mentioning his mother and abused him. After divorcing his father, Hank's mother married Charles Tanner in 1930. Unwilling to work, Snow began visiting his mother in nearby Liverpool, and eventually, after his grandmother's attempt to send him to reform school failed, he was allowed to rejoin his mother.

=== Musical beginnings ===
After his mother's remarriage, she ordered a Hawaiian steel guitar and lessons, along with 78 rpm gramophone records. Initially, she forbade Snow from touching it, but later, she was amazed by his skill. He was soon playing for neighbours and others.

=== Life at sea ===
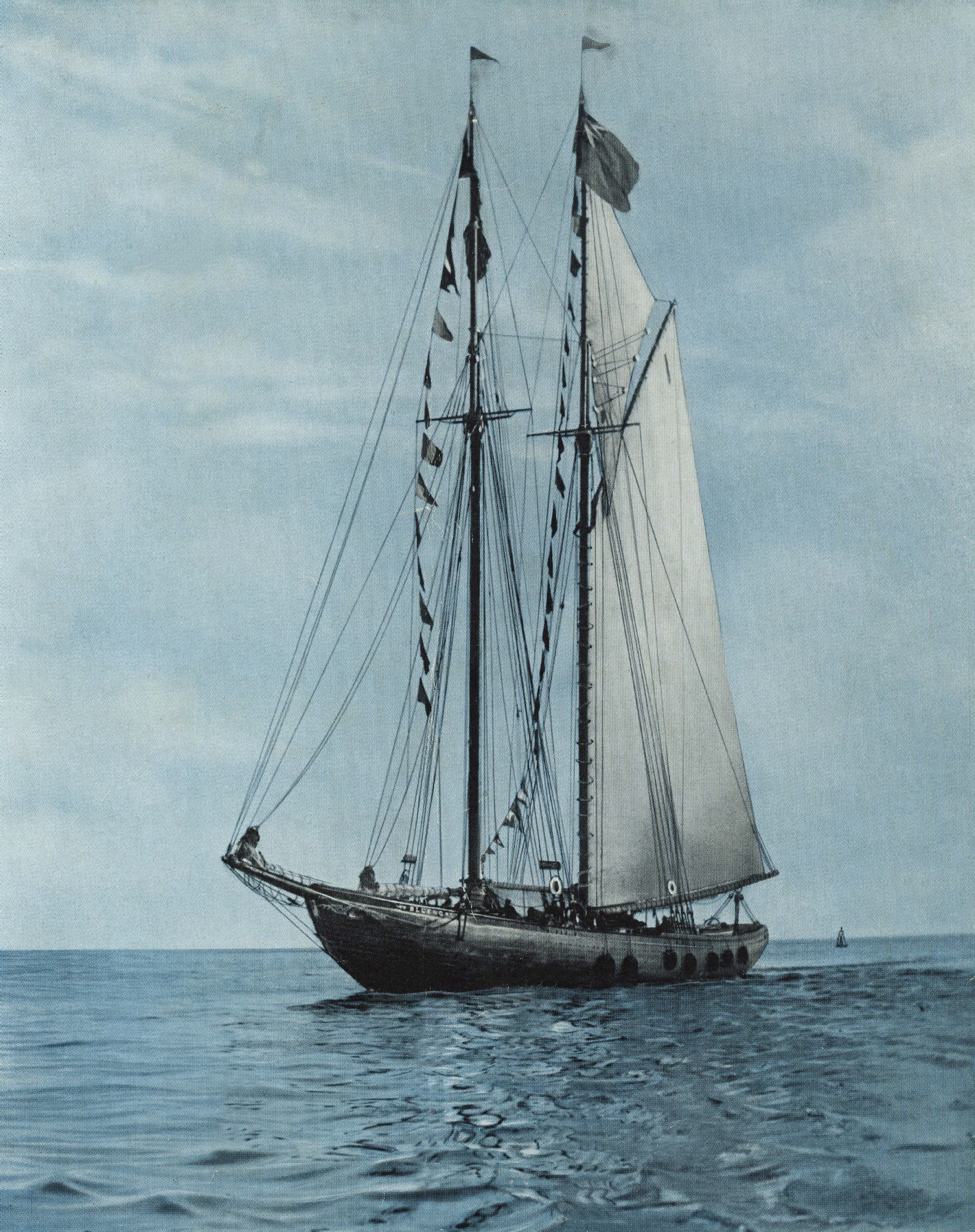
Photo of the Bluenose. Snow painted the schooner on cardboard winning 1st prize at the Lunenburg Fisheries Exhibition.

In 1926, Snow worked on a fishing schooner as a cabin boy. The job was unpaid, but Snow was allowed to sell cod tongues and fish he caught. After one trip, he used his earnings to buy a guitar and chord book. In 1927 or 1928, he heard radio broadcasts of country artists like Vernon Dalhart and Carson Robison, which inspired him to sing and play for his crewmates.

In August 1930, Snow's schooner nearly wrecked on Sable Island, but they were saved by a change in wind. Witnessing other vessels lost in the storm, he vowed to never return to sea.

=== Life after sailing ===
Snow returned home and worked at various odd jobs, including peddling fish, transporting passengers, unloading ships, and working in the woods. In September 1935, he married Minnie Blanche Aalders. Their son, Jimmie Rodgers Snow, was born soon after.

== Career ==
=== Early music career ===
Snow bought a new guitar and, playing in the style of Jimmie Rodgers, performed in a fish house and a minstrel show in Bridgewater. He later auditioned for Halifax radio station CHNS, and was hired for a Saturday evening show. He adopted the stage name "Hank, The Yodeling Ranger," and performed in various venues, gaining popularity through radio broadcasts.

=== Canadian years ===
In 1936, Snow auditioned for the Canadian division of RCA Victor in Montreal, Quebec, securing a recording contract. His weekly CBC radio show and touring brought him national recognition in Canada, and in the late 1940s his records began to gain popularity with American country music stations.

=== Nashville ===
Snow moved to Nashville, Tennessee, in 1949, releasing records for RCA Victor under the name "Hank Snow, the Singing Ranger." His performance at the Grand Ole Opry in 1950 brought him widespread attention in the United States. His song "I'm Moving On" became a number-one hit, holding the top spot for 21 weeks. Other number-one hits followed, including "The Golden Rocket" and "The Rhumba Boogie". His rendition of Australian country singer Geoff Mack's "I've Been Everywhere" popularized the song in North America. While performing in Renfro Valley, Snow worked with a young Hank Williams. In 1953, Billboard reported that Snow's son, Jimmie Rodgers Snow, had signed with RCA Victor and would record with his father.

=== Rainbow Ranch ===
After the success of "I've Been Everywhere" and "I'm Movin' On," Snow purchased a ranch home in Madison, Tennessee, which he named Rainbow Ranch. In recent years the home has been restored by Snow's family. The home was added to the National Register of Historic Places listings in Davidson County, Tennessee on November 27, 2018.

=== Elvis Presley ===
Snow helped launch the career of Elvis Presley by giving him stage time at the Grand Ole Opry and by introducing him to Colonel Tom Parker. They formed a management partnership, but Snow eventually left the management team.

=== Later career ===
Snow continued to reference Canada in his work, such as in his 1968 album My Nova Scotia Home. He was inducted into the Nashville Songwriters Hall of Fame in 1978 and several Canadian music halls of fame. His autobiography, The Hank Snow Story, was published in 1994. He also established the Hank Snow International Foundation For Prevention Of Child Abuse.

== Illness and death ==
Snow retired in 1996 due to respiratory problems. He died on December 20, 1999, at his Rainbow Ranch in Madison, Tennessee, and was buried in Nashville's Spring Hill Cemetery. His wife Minnie died on May 12, 2003.

== Legacy ==
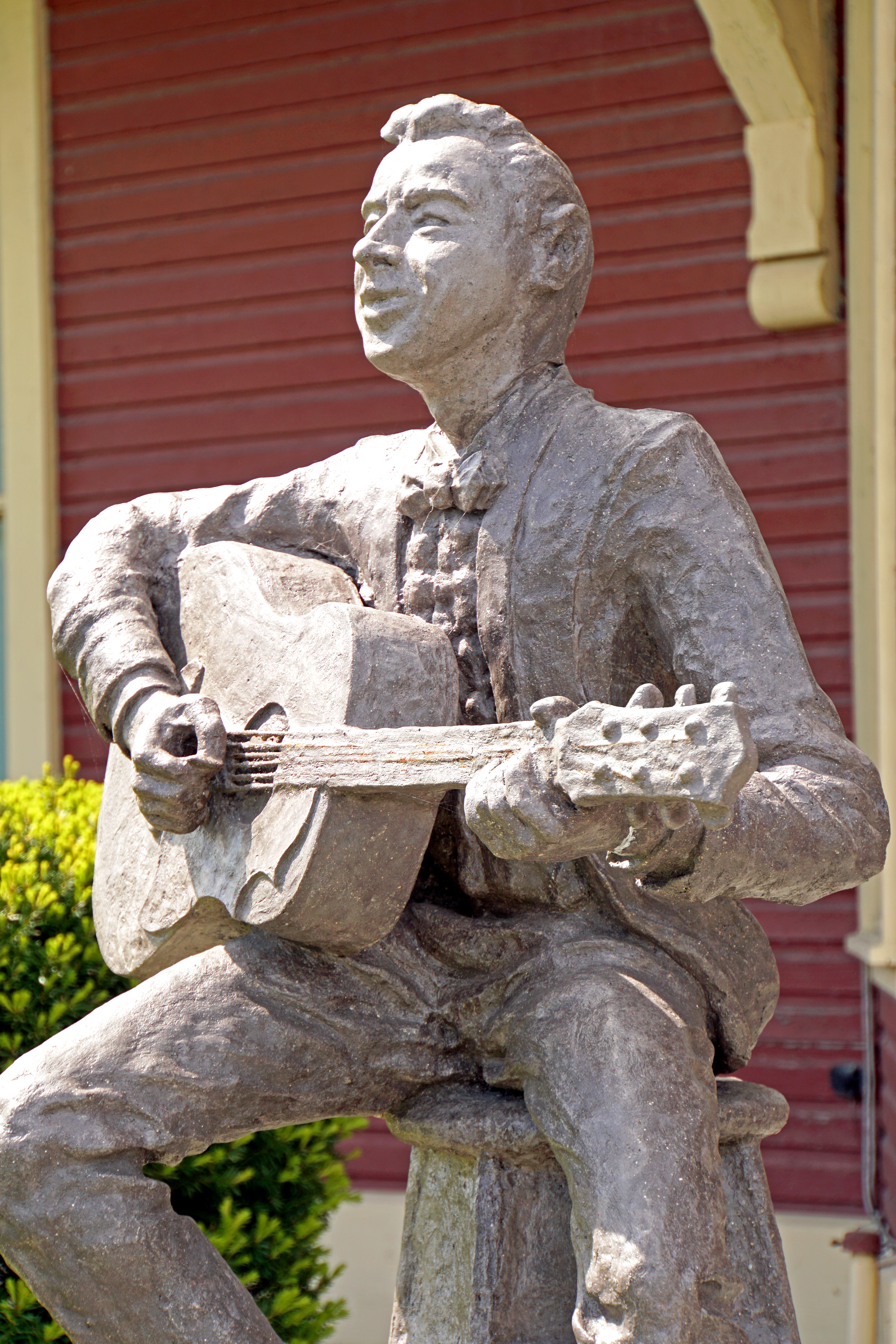
Hank Snow's statue at the Hank Snow Hometown Museum in Liverpool, Nova Scotia.

Many artists have covered his music, including Elvis Presley, the Rolling Stones, Ray Charles, Ashley MacIsaac, Johnny Cash, and Emmylou Harris. His song "Hello Love" was used to open broadcasts of A Prairie Home Companion. At 59 years and 11 months old, he became the oldest country artist to have a number-one hit, a record that stood for more than 26 years. In Robert Altman's 1975 film Nashville, a character was partly based on Snow. He is portrayed by David Wenham in Baz Luhrmann's Elvis. He is referenced in Jimmy Buffett's song "The Wino and I Know". The fictional Finnish snow god, Heikki Lunta, from Michigan's Upper Peninsula, is named after him.

== See also ==
- Music of Canada
- List of best-selling music artists

== Bibliography ==
- Oickle, Vernon (2014). I'm Movin' On: The Life and Legacy of Hank Snow. Halifax, NS: Nimbus Publishing. ISBN 978-1-7710-8138-2.
- Wolfe, Charles. (1998). "Hank Snow". In The Encyclopedia of Country Music. Paul Kingsbury, Editor. New York: Oxford University Press. pp. 494–5.
