= 1950 in country music =

This is a list of notable events in country music that took place in the year 1950.

== Events ==
- February 14 — "Chattanoogie Shoe Shine Boy" by Red Foley #1 selling Country record becomes first Country cross over on Pop Best Seller chart.
- August 19 — Hank Snow begins a 21-week run at No. 1 on the Billboard country charts with his landmark "I'm Movin' On." Until 2013 (when changes to chart methodology will result in longer chart runs), the song – a 12-bar blues song metaphorically using a train trip to describe a young man's breakup with a high-class girlfriend – is one of just three that will stay as long atop the charts in chart history.
- September 30 — The Grand Ole Opry is televised for the first time.

== Top hits of the year ==
=== Number one hits ===
(As certified by Billboard magazine)

US	Single	Artist
January 7	"Rudolph the Red-Nosed Reindeer", 7,000,000 sold by 1969	Gene Autry
January 7	"Blue Christmas"	Ernest Tubb
January 14	"I Love You Because"	Leon Payne
January 14	"Blues Stay Away From Me"	Delmore Brothers
January 21	"Chattanoogie Shoe Shine Boy"	Red Foley
January 28	"Take Me in Your Arms and Hold Me"	Eddy Arnold
April 22	"Long Gone Lonesome Blues"	Hank Williams with His Drifting Cowboys
May 27	"Birmingham Bounce"	Red Foley
June 17	"Why Don't You Love Me"	Hank Williams with His Drifting Cowboys
June 17	"I'll Sail My Ship Alone"	Moon Mullican
July 15	"M-I-S-S-I-S-S-I-P-P-I"	Red Foley
August 19	"I'm Movin' On"	Hank Snow and His Rainbow Ranch Boys
August 26	"Goodnight Irene"	Red Foley and Ernest Tubb
December 23	"If You've Got the Money I've Got the Time"	Lefty Frizzell
December 3	"Moanin' the Blues"	Hank Williams with His Drifting Cowboys

Note: Several songs were simultaneous No. 1 hits on the separate "Most Played Juke Box Folk (Country & Western) Records," "Best Selling Retail Folk (Country & Western) Records" and "Country & Western Records Most Played by Folk Disk Jockeys" charts.

=== Other major hits ===
US	Single	Artist
5	Ain't Nobody's Business by My Own	Kay Starr and Tennessee Ernie Ford
6	A-Sleeping at the Foot of the Bed	Little Jimmy Dickens
7	Beyond the Sunset	The Three Suns with Elton Britt and Rosalie Allen
4	Bloodshot Eyes	Hank Penny
7	Blues, Stay Away from Me	Owen Bradley Quintet
10	Bonaparte's Retreat	Pee Wee King
2	Broken Down Merry-Go-Round	Margaret Whiting and Jimmy Wakely
6	A Bushel and a Peck	Margaret Whiting and Jimmy Wakely
8	Careless Kisses	Red Foley
5	Choc'late Ice Cream Cone	Red Foley
8	Choc'late Ice Cream Cone	Kenny Roberts
2	Cincinnati Dancing Pig	Red Foley
7	Cry of the Dying Duck in a Thunder-Storm	Cactus Pryor
2	The Cry of the Wild Goose	Tennessee Ernie Ford
2	Cuddle Buggin' Baby	Eddy Arnold
6	Daddy's Last Letter	Tex Ritter
7	Don't Be Ashamed of Your Age	Ernest Tubb and Red Foley
6	Enclosed, One Broken Heart	Eddy Arnold
8	Faded Love	Bob Wills
4	Frosty the Snow Man	Gene Autry
9	Give Me a Little Old Fashioned Love	Ernest Tubb
9	God Please Protect America	Jimmie Osborne
3	The Gods Were Angry with Me	Margaret Whiting and Jimmy Wakely
5	Goodnight, Irene	Moon Mullican
3	Hillbilly Fever	Little Jimmy Dickens
9	Hillbilly Fever No. 2	Ernest Tubb and Red Foley
4	I Gotta Have My Baby Back	Floyd Tillman
10	I Gotta Have My Baby Back	Red Foley
5	I Just Don't Like This Kind of Living	Hank Williams
2	I Love You Because	Ernest Tubb
8	I Love You Because	Clyde Moody
3	(I Won't Go Huntin', Jake) But I'll Go Chasin' Women	Stuart Hamblen
2	I'll Never Be Free	Kay Starr and Tennessee Ernie Ford
8	I'll Take a Back Seat for You	Ernest Tubb
10	Ida Red Likes The Boogie	Bob Wills
9	Just a Closer Walk with Thee	Red Foley
2	Let's Go to Church (Next Sunday Morning)	Margaret Whiting and Jimmy Wakely
2	Letters Have No Arms	Ernest Tubb
3	Little Angel with the Dirty Face	Eddy Arnold
7	Lose Your Blues	Red Kirk
8	Love Song in 32 Bars	Johnny Bond
2	The Lovebug Itch	Eddy Arnold
6	Mama and Daddy Broke My Heart	Eddy Arnold
4	Mona Lisa	Moon Mullican
10	Mona Lisa	Jimmy Wakely
9	My Son Calls Another Man Daddy	Hank Williams
9	Nobody's Lonesome for Me	Hank Williams
8	Our Lady of Fatima	Red Foley
7	Pan American Boogie	The Delmore Brothers
3	Peter Cottontail	Gene Autry
6	Peter Cottontail	Mervin Shiner
7	Peter Cottontail	Jimmy Wakely
7	Peter Cottontail	Johnnie Lee Wills
10	A Prison Without Walls	Eddy Arnold
3	Quicksilver	Elton Britt and Rosalie Allen
2	Rag Mop	Johnnie Lee Wills
2	(Remember Me) I'm the One Who Loves You	Stuart Hamblen
5	(Remember Me) I'm the One Who Loves You	Ernest Tubb
5	Rudolph the Red-Nosed Reindeer	Gene Autry
7	Slippin' Around with Jole Blon	Bud Messner
8	Stampede	Roy Rogers
9	Steal Away	Red Foley
4	Sugarfoot Rag	Red Foley
3	Sunday Down in Tennessee	Red Foley
2	Tennessee Border No. 2	Red Foley and Ernest Tubb
6	There's No Wings on My Angel	Eddy Arnold
5	They'll Never Take Her Love from Me	Hank Williams
3	Throw Your Love My Way	Ernest Tubb
8	Unfaithful One	Ernest Tubb
3	Why Should I Cry?	Eddy Arnold
9	Why Should We Try Anymore	Hank Williams
10	You Don't Have to Be a Baby to Cry	Ernest Tubb

== Births ==
- January 1 – Steve Ripley, leader/producer of The Tractors (died 2019).
- February 16 — Paul Worley, record producer whose success dates from the mid-1980s onward.
- March 26 — Ronnie McDowell, male vocalist of the 1970s and 1980s, who first rose to fame with his Elvis Presley tribute "The King Is Gone".
- August 7 — Rodney Crowell, singer-songwriter who enjoyed mainstream fame in the late 1980s before becoming a leader in the alternative country movement; ex-husband of Rosanne Cash.
- September 16 — David Bellamy, of The Bellamy Brothers.
