= Country USA (Time-Life Music) =

Album by Time Life

Country USA was a 23-volume series issued by Time-Life Music during the late 1980s and early 1990s, spotlighting country music of the 1950s through early 1970s.

Each volume in the series chronicled a specific year in country music, from 1950 through 1972, and was issued on a double-length compact disc or cassette, or two vinyl albums. Individual volumes contained 24 tracks, usually representing the year's most popular and important songs. Also included was a booklet, containing liner notes written by some of the most respected historians of the genre, photographs of the artists, and information on the songs (writers, performers and peak position on Billboard magazine's country charts).

All told, the entire series contains 552 tracks.

== History ==
"Country USA" was first issued during the summer of 1988, and is patterned after Time-Life's successful "Rock'n'Roll Era" and "Your Hit Parade" series. It represented Time-Life's first real attempt at chronicling country music's post-1950 history; earlier in the 1980s, Time-Life had a budget "Country Series" and the later "Country & Western Classics."

During its peak, the "Country USA" series was advertised in television and magazine advertisements. The series was available by subscription (by calling a 1-800 number); those who purchased the series in that fashion received a new volume roughly every other month (on the format of their choice), and had the option of keeping just the volumes they wanted. Each volume was also offered for individual sale.

New volumes continued to be issued through 1991. Another series, "Contemporary Country," essentially picked up where "Country USA" left off, as that series covered the 1970s through early 1990s.

Time-Life continued to offer "Country USA" through the early first decade of the 21st century. The series has essentially been replaced by "Classic Country." Three newer series — "Country Gold," "Superstars of Country" and "Lifetime of Country Romance" — have also since been issued.

Critics widely hailed "Country USA" as a definitive overview of the genre during what some refer to as the Golden Age. In many cases, the songs offered on each volume represented the first time they had ever been re-released on compact disc. However, critics tempered their praise by pointing out a few minor faults, such as the exclusion of some tracks (in lieu of songs that weren't necessarily hits) and alternate versions/re-recordings of some hits.

=== The series ===
The track listings below represent the sequencing on the compact discs. While the sequencing is identical on the records and cassettes, some songs may be on different sides.

Also, while the years will be listed sequentially under the track listing section, the "Country USA" series was not issued sequentially by year. The series was issued in the following order:

- 1988 – 1961, 1957, 1962 and 1970.
- 1989 – 1971, 1968, 1958, 1969, 1959, 1965, 1963 and 1960.
- 1990 – 1956, 1964, 1954, 1952, 1967, 1972, 1955 and 1953.
- 1991 – 1966, 1951 and 1950.

== Track listing ==
=== 1950 ===
- "Hillbilly Fever" – Little Jimmy Dickens
- "Birmingham Bounce" – Red Foley
- "If You've Got the Money I've Got the Time" – Lefty Frizzell
- "My Bucket's Got a Hole in It" – Hank Williams
- "Throw Your Love My Way" – Ernest Tubb
- "Remember Me (I'm the One Who Loves You)" – Stuart Hamblen
- "Cuddle Buggin' Baby" – Eddy Arnold
- "The Gods Were Angry With Me" – Margaret Whiting and Jimmy Wakely
- "Moanin' the Blues" – Hank Williams
- "I Love You a Thousand Ways" – Lefty Frizzell
- "Chattanoogie Shoe Shine Boy" – Red Foley
- "I'm Moving On" – Hank Snow
- "Anticipation Blues" – Tennessee Ernie Ford
- "Why Don't You Love Me" – Hank Williams
- "The Lovebug Itch" – Eddy Arnold
- "Letters Have No Arms" – Ernest Tubb
- "I Love You Because" – Leon Payne
- "A-Sleepin' at the Foot of the Bed" – Little Jimmy Dickens
- "Mississippi" – Red Foley
- "Take Me in Your Arms and Hold Me" – Eddy Arnold
- "Quicksilver" – Elton Britt and Rosalie Allen
- "Long Gone Lonesome Blues" – Hank Williams
- "Mule Train" – Tennessee Ernie Ford
- "Goodnight Irene" – Red Foley and Ernest Tubb

=== 1951 ===
- "The Golden Rocket" – Hank Snow
- "Howlin' at the Moon" – Hank Williams
- "The Shot Gun Boogie" – Tennessee Ernie Ford
- "There's Been a Change in Me" – Eddy Arnold
- "Mom and Dad's Waltz" – Lefty Frizzell
- "Let Old Mother Nature Have Her Way" – Carl Smith
- "Hot Rod Race" – Ramblin' Jimmie Dolan
- "Hey Good Lookin'" – Hank Williams
- "Kentucky Waltz" – Eddy Arnold
- "Down Yonder" – Del Wood
- "Slow Poke" – Pee Wee King and His Golden West Cowboys (feat. Redd Stewart)
- "Always Late (With Your Kisses)" – Lefty Frizzell
- "Alabama Jubilee" – Red Foley
- "The Rhumba Boogie" – Hank Snow
- "Poison Love" – Johnnie and Jack
- "I Can't Help It (If I'm Still in Love with You)" – Hank Williams
- "Let's Live a Little" – Carl Smith
- "I Want to Be with You Always" – Lefty Frizzell
- "Cherokee Boogie (Eh-Oh Aleena)" – Moon Mullican
- "I Wanna Play House With You" – Eddy Arnold
- "The Tennessee Waltz" – Patti Page
- "Music Makin' Mama from Memphis" – Hank Snow
- "Cold, Cold Heart" – Hank Williams
- "Peace in the Valley" – Red Foley

=== 1952 ===
- "Jambalaya (On the Bayou)" – Hank Williams
- "Blackberry Boogie" – Tennessee Ernie Ford
- "That Heart Belongs to Me" – Webb Pierce
- "Midnight" – Red Foley
- "Are You Teasing Me" – Carl Smith
- "Give Me More, More, More (Of Your Kisses)" – Lefty Frizzell
- "A Full Time Job" – Eddy Arnold
- "The Wild Side of Life" – Hank Thompson
- "It Wasn't God Who Made Honky Tonk Angels" – Kitty Wells
- "Half as Much" – Hank Williams
- "Back Street Affair" – Webb Pierce
- "Almost" – George Morgan
- "Too Old to Cut the Mustard" – Ernest Tubb and Red Foley
- "I'm an Old, Old Man (Tryin' to Live While I Can)" – Lefty Frizzell
- "(When You Feel Like You're in Love) Don't Just Stand There" – Carl Smith
- "Easy on the Eyes" – Eddy Arnold
- "Indian Love Call" – Slim Whitman
- "Waiting in the Lobby of Your Heart" – Hank Thompson
- "Don't Let the Stars Get in Your Eyes" – Skeets McDonald
- "Wondering" – Webb Pierce
- "Don't Stay Away (Till Love Grows Cold)" – Lefty Frizzell
- "Missing in Action" – Ernest Tubb
- "I'll Never Get Out of This World Alive" – Hank Williams
- "The Gold Rush Is Over" – Hank Snow

=== 1953 ===
- "No Help Wanted" – The Carlisles
- "Hey Joe!" – Carl Smith
- "Eddy's Song" – Eddy Arnold
- "There Stands the Glass" – Webb Pierce
- "Paying for That Back Street Affair" – Kitty Wells
- "Yesterday's Girl" – Hank Thompson
- "I Let the Stars Get in My Eyes" – Goldie Hill
- "Your Cheatin' Heart" – Hank Williams
- "(Now and Then There's) A Fool Such as I" – Hank Snow
- "I Couldn't Keep from Crying" – Marty Robbins
- "It's Been So Long" – Webb Pierce
- "Crying in the Chapel" – Rex Allen
- "Mexican Joe" – Jim Reeves
- "Rub-a-Dub-Dub" – Hank Thompson
- "Kaw-Liga" – Hank Williams
- "I Forgot More Than You'll Ever Know" – The Davis Sisters
- "I'll Go On Alone" – Marty Robbins
- "Shake a Hand" – Red Foley
- "I'm Walking the Dog" – Webb Pierce
- "How Much is That Hound Dog in the Window" – Homer and Jethro
- "Bimbo" – Jim Reeves
- "Take These Chains from My Heart" – Hank Williams
- "A Dear John Letter" – Jean Shepard and Ferlin Husky
- "Wake Up, Irene" – Hank Thompson

=== 1954 ===
- "That's All Right" – Marty Robbins
- "Sure Fire Kisses" – Justin Tubb and Goldie Hill
- "Honky-Tonk Girl" – Hank Thompson
- "More and More" – Webb Pierce
- "I Don't Hurt Anymore" – Hank Snow
- "If You Ain't Lovin' (You Ain't Livin')" – Faron Young
- "You Better Not Do That" – Tommy Collins
- "Back Up Buddy" – Carl Smith
- "I'll Be There (If You Ever Want Me)" – Ray Price
- "I Really Don't Want to Know" – Eddy Arnold
- "If You Don't Somebody Else Will" – Jimmy & Johnny
- "Secret Love" – Slim Whitman
- "Blue Moon of Kentucky" – Elvis Presley
- "Even Tho" – Webb Pierce
- "Two Glasses Joe" – Ernest Tubb
- "One by One" – Red Foley and Kitty Wells
- "Loose Talk" – Carl Smith
- "Let Me Go Lover" – Hank Snow
- "This Ole House" – Stuart Hamblen
- "Watcha Gonna Do Now" – Tommy Collins
- "Slowly" – Webb Pierce
- "Release Me" – Ray Price
- "The New Green Light" – Hank Thompson
- "Goodnight Sweetheart Goodnight" – Johnnie and Jack

=== 1955 ===
- "Live Fast, Love Hard, Die Young" – Faron Young
- "I've Been Thinking" – Eddy Arnold
- "There She Goes" – Carl Smith
- "When I Stop Dreaming" – The Louvin Brothers
- "I Forgot to Remember to Forget" – Elvis Presley
- "Yellow Roses" – Hank Snow
- "Love Love Love" – Webb Pierce
- "Why Baby Why" – George Jones
- "Sixteen Tons" – Tennessee Ernie Ford
- "Just Call Me Lonesome" – Eddy Arnold
- "Making Believe" – Kitty Wells
- "It Tickles" – Tommy Collins
- "Mystery Train" – Elvis Presley
- "In the Jailhouse Now" – Webb Pierce
- "Cry! Cry! Cry!" – Johnny Cash
- "All Right" – Faron Young
- "Eat Drink and Be Merry (Tomorrow You'll Cry)" – Porter Wagoner
- "The Cattle Call" – Eddy Arnold
- "Wildwood Flower" – Hank Thompson
- "As Long as I Live" – Red Foley & Kitty Wells
- "Kisses Don't Lie" – Carl Smith
- "A Satisfied Mind" – Porter Wagoner
- "I Don't Care" – Webb Pierce
- "Yonder Comes a Sucker" – Jim Reeves

=== 1956 ===
- "Heartbreak Hotel" – Elvis Presley
- "Why Baby Why" – Red Sovine & Webb Pierce
- "I've Got Five Dollars and It's Saturday Night" – Faron Young
- "Cash on the Barrel Head" – The Louvin Brothers
- "I Take the Chance" – The Browns
- "The Blackboard of My Heart" – Hank Thompson
- "Singing the Blues" – Marty Robbins
- "Crazy Arms" – Ray Price
- "I Want You I Need You I Love You" – Elvis Presley
- "I'm a One-Woman Man" – Johnny Horton
- "You and Me" – Red Foley & Kitty Wells
- "I Walk the Line" – Johnny Cash
- "Blue Suede Shoes" – Carl Perkins
- "Any Old Time" – Webb Pierce
- "I Don't Believe You've Met My Baby" – The Louvin Brothers
- "Trouble in Mind" – Eddy Arnold
- "I've Got a New Heartache" – Ray Price
- "Searching" – Kitty Wells
- "You Are the One" – Carl Smith
- "Sweet Dreams" – Faron Young
- "Yes I Know Why" – Webb Pierce
- "Folsom Prison Blues" – Johnny Cash
- "You're Running Wild" – The Louvin Brothers
- "You Don't Know Me" – Eddy Arnold

=== 1957 ===
- "Honky Tonk Song" – Webb Pierce
- "A White Sport Coat (And a Pink Carnation)" – Marty Robbins
- "Dixie Fried" – Carl Perkins
- "Home of the Blues" – Johnny Cash
- "Walkin' After Midnight" – Patsy Cline
- "My Special Angel" – Bobby Helms
- "Bye Bye Love" – The Everly Brothers
- "Gonna Find Me a Bluebird" – Marvin Rainwater
- "A Fallen Star" – Jimmy C. Newman
- "Four Walls" – Jim Reeves
- "Repenting" – Kitty Wells
- "The Story of My Life" – Marty Robbins
- "My Shoes Keep Walking Back to You" – Ray Price
- "Young Love" – Sonny James
- "I'm Tired" – Webb Pierce
- "Fraulein" – Bobby Helms
- "I Found My Girl in the USA" – Jimmie Skinner
- "You Win Again" – Jerry Lee Lewis
- "I'm Coming Home" – Johnny Horton
- "Knee Deep in the Blues" – Marty Robbins
- "Am I Losing You" – Jim Reeves
- "Tangled Mind" – Hank Snow
- "Honeycomb" – Jimmie Rodgers
- "Gone" – Ferlin Husky

=== 1958 ===
- "Oh Lonesome Me" – Don Gibson
- "Tupelo County Jail" – Webb Pierce
- "Just Married" – Marty Robbins
- "Invitation to the Blues" – Ray Price
- "Pick Me Up on Your Way Down" – Charlie Walker
- "Don't" – Elvis Presley
- "Guess Things Happen That Way" – Johnny Cash
- "Treasure of Love" – George Jones
- "All I Have to Do Is Dream" – Everly Brothers
- "She's No Angel" – Kitty Wells
- "I Can't Stop Loving You" – Don Gibson
- "Squaws Along the Yukon" – Hank Thompson
- "Cigarettes and Coffee Blues" – Lefty Frizzell
- "Half a Mind" – Ernest Tubb
- "Alone with You" – Faron Young
- "Blue Boy" – Jim Reeves
- "City Lights" – Ray Price
- "It's Only Make Believe" – Conway Twitty
- "My Baby's Gone" – Louvin Brothers
- "Bird Dog" – Everly Brothers
- "Ballad of a Teenage Queen" – Johnny Cash
- "Blue Blue Day" – Don Gibson
- "Life to Go" – Stonewall Jackson
- "Send Me the Pillow You Dream On – Hank Locklin

=== 1959 ===
- "The Battle of New Orleans" – Johnny Horton
- "White Lightning" – George Jones
- "Who Cares" – Don Gibson
- "The Three Bells" – The Browns
- "Black Land Farmer" – Frankie Miller
- "The Same Old Me" – Ray Price
- "El Paso" – Marty Robbins
- "Amigo's Guitar" – Kitty Wells
- "I Ain't Never" – Webb Pierce
- "Cabin on the Hill" – Lester Flatt & Earl Scruggs
- "Gotta Travel On" – Billy Grammer
- "He'll Have to Go" – Jim Reeves
- "Who Shot Sam" – George Jones
- "Country Girl" – Faron Young
- "Set Him Free" – Skeeter Davis
- "When It's Springtime in Alaska (It's Forty Below)" – Johnny Horton
- "Under Your Spell Again" – Buck Owens
- "Don't Take Your Guns to Town" – Johnny Cash
- "Tennessee Stud" – Eddy Arnold
- "Heartaches by the Number" – Ray Price
- "Come Walk with Me" – Wilma Lee & Stoney Cooper
- "Waterloo" – Stonewall Jackson
- "Don't Tell Me Your Troubles" – Don Gibson
- "Long Black Veil" – Lefty Frizzell

=== 1960 ===
- "One More Time" – Ray Price
- "Alabam" – Cowboy Copas
- "No Love Have I" – Webb Pierce
- "Left to Right" – Kitty Wells
- "Another" – Roy Drusky
- "Excuse Me (I Think I've Got a Heartache)" – Buck Owens
- "A Six Pack to Go" – Hank Thompson
- "Miller's Cave" – Hank Snow
- "I Missed Me" – Jim Reeves
- "Just One Time" – Don Gibson
- "Your Old Used to Be" – Faron Young
- "Family Bible" – Claude Gray
- "Wishful Thinking" – Wynn Stewart
- "North to Alaska" – Johnny Horton
- "Honky Tonk Girl" – Loretta Lynn
- "Fallen Angel" – Webb Pierce
- "Big Iron" – Marty Robbins
- "Let's Think About Living" – Bob Luman
- "Hot Rod Lincoln" – Charlie Ryan
- "Above and Beyond" – Buck Owens
- "Wings of a Dove" – Ferlin Husky
- "Please Help Me, I'm Falling" – Hank Locklin
- "(I Can't Help You) I'm Falling Too" – Skeeter Davis
- "Last Date" – Floyd Cramer

=== 1961 ===
- "I Fall to Pieces" – Patsy Cline
- "Heart over Mind" – Ray Price
- "Walk On By" – Leroy Van Dyke
- "Don't Worry" – Marty Robbins
- "Sleepy-Eyed John" – Johnny Horton
- "My Last Date (With You)" – Skeeter Davis
- "Foolin' Around" – Buck Owens
- "The Window Up Above" – George Jones
- "Po' Folks" – Bill Anderson
- "Beggar to a King" – Hank Snow
- "Heartbreak U.S.A." – Kitty Wells
- "Sweet Dreams" – Don Gibson
- "Hello Walls" – Faron Young
- "Louisiana Man" – Rusty and Doug
- "I Dreamed of a Hill-Billy Heaven" – Tex Ritter
- "Three Hearts in a Tangle" – Roy Drusky
- "Oklahoma Hills" – Hank Thompson
- "Crazy" – Patsy Cline
- "Big Bad John" – Jimmy Dean
- "Your Old Love Letters" – Porter Wagoner
- "Tender Years" – George Jones
- "Right or Wrong" – Wanda Jackson
- "Sea of Heartbreak" – Don Gibson
- "Under the Influence of Love" – Buck Owens

=== 1962 ===
- "The Ballad of Jed Clampett" – Lester Flatt and Earl Scruggs
- "Wolverton Mountain" – Claude King
- "She Thinks I Still Care" – George Jones
- "Imagine That" – Patsy Cline
- "I Can Mend Your Broken Heart" – Don Gibson
- "I've Been Everywhere" – Hank Snow
- "Ruby Ann" – Marty Robbins
- "Don't Let Me Cross Over" – Carl Butler
- "Success" – Loretta Lynn
- "Charlie's Shoes" – Billy Walker
- "Misery Loves Company" – Porter Wagoner
- "Funny How Time Slips Away" – Willie Nelson
- "Lonesome Number One" – Don Gibson
- "Honky-Tonk Man" – Johnny Horton
- "Mama Sang a Song" – Bill Anderson
- "A Wound Time Can't Erase" – Stonewall Jackson
- "She's Got You" – Patsy Cline
- "Devil Woman" – Marty Robbins
- "In the Jailhouse Now" – Johnny Cash
- "The End of the World" – Skeeter Davis
- "Trouble's Back in Town" – The Wilburn Brothers
- "Touch Me" – Willie Nelson
- "If a Woman Answers (Hang Up the Phone)" – Leroy Van Dyke
- "Adios Amigo" – Jim Reeves

=== 1963 ===
- "Ring of Fire" – Johnny Cash
- "Act Naturally" – Buck Owens
- "Not What I Had in Mind" – George Jones
- "Night Life" – Ray Price
- "Leavin' on Your Mind" – Patsy Cline
- "Begging to You" – Marty Robbins
- "Six Days on the Road" – Dave Dudley
- "Detroit City" – Bobby Bare
- "Thanks a Lot" – Ernest Tubb
- "We Must Have Been Out of Our Minds" – George Jones and Melba Montgomery
- "From a Jack to a King" – Ned Miller
- "Make the World Go Away" – Ray Price
- "Love's Gonna Live Here" – Buck Owens
- "Ninety Miles an Hour (Down a Dead End Street)" – Hank Snow
- "Faded Love" – Patsy Cline
- "500 Miles Away from Home" – Bobby Bare
- "Roll Muddy River" – The Wilburn Brothers
- "Still" – Bill Anderson
- "Talk Back Trembling Lips" – Ernest Ashworth
- "Before I'm Over You" – Loretta Lynn
- "Abilene" – George Hamilton IV
- "The Matador" – Johnny Cash
- "Lonesome 7-7203" – Hawkshaw Hawkins
- "B.J. the D.J." – Stonewall Jackson
- "Sweet Dreams (Of You)" – Patsy Cline

=== 1964 ===
- "The Race Is On" – George Jones
- "Understand Your Man" – Johnny Cash
- "Second Fiddle (To an Old Guitar)" – Jean Shepard
- "Don't Be Angry" – Stonewall Jackson
- "Together Again" – Buck Owens
- "You're the Only World I Know" – Sonny James
- "Chug-a-Lug" – Roger Miller
- "Happy Birthday" – Loretta Lynn
- "Long Gone Lonesome Blues" – Hank Williams Jr.
- "Sorrow on the Rocks" – Porter Wagoner
- "The Ballad of Ira Hayes" – Johnny Cash
- "Four Strong Winds" – Bobby Bare
- "My Heart Skips a Beat" – Buck Owens
- "Saginaw, Michigan" – Lefty Frizzell
- "I Guess I'm Crazy" – Jim Reeves
- "Cross the Brazos at Waco" – Billy Walker
- "Your Heart Turned Left (And I Was on the Right)" – George Jones
- "Burning Memories" – Ray Price
- "It Ain't Me Babe" – Johnny Cash
- "I Don't Care (Just as Long as You Love Me)" – Buck Owens
- "Dang Me" – Roger Miller
- "Once a Day" – Connie Smith
- "Widow Maker" – Jimmy Martin
- "Welcome to My World" – Jim Reeves

=== 1965 ===
- "I've Got a Tiger By the Tail" – Buck Owens
- "(My Friends Are Gonna Be) Strangers" – Merle Haggard
- "Things Have Gone to Pieces" – George Jones
- "I Washed My Hands in Muddy Water" – Stonewall Jackson
- "Make the World Go Away" – Eddy Arnold
- "King of the Road" – Roger Miller
- "Orange Blossom Special" – Johnny Cash
- "Flowers on the Wall" – Statler Brothers
- "Then and Only Then" – Connie Smith
- "Skid Row Joe" – Porter Wagoner
- "Behind the Tear" – Sonny James
- "Ribbon of Darkness" – Marty Robbins
- "Girl on the Billboard" – Del Reeves
- "Take Me" – George Jones
- "This Is It" – Jim Reeves
- "Blue Kentucky Girl" – Loretta Lynn
- "Kansas City Star" – Roger Miller
- "What's He Doing in My World" – Eddy Arnold
- "Yakety Axe" – Chet Atkins
- "Green, Green Grass of Home" – Porter Wagoner
- "The Other Woman" – Ray Price
- "Before You Go" – Buck Owens
- "Is It Really Over?" – Jim Reeves
- "Ten Little Bottles" – Johnny Bond

=== 1966 ===
- "Open Up Your Heart" – Buck Owens
- "Don't Come Home A-Drinkin' (With Lovin' on Your Mind)" – Loretta Lynn
- "Swinging Doors" – Merle Haggard
- "Almost Persuaded" – David Houston
- "Take Good Care of Her" – Sonny James
- "(That's What You Get) For Lovin' Me" – Waylon Jennings
- "I Get the Fever" – Bill Anderson
- "The Streets of Baltimore" – Bobby Bare
- "Would You Hold It Against Me" – Dottie West
- "You Ain't Woman Enough" – Loretta Lynn
- "There Goes My Everything" – Jack Greene
- "Distant Drums" – Jim Reeves
- "The Bottle Let Me Down" – Merle Haggard
- "Waitin' in Your Welfare Line" – Buck Owens
- "The Hurtin's All Over" – Connie Smith
- "Room in Your Heart" – Sonny James
- "The One on the Right Is on the Left" – Johnny Cash
- "England Swings" – Roger Miller
- "Queen of the House" – Jody Miller
- "Four-O-Thirty-Three" – George Jones
- "Blue Side of Lonesome" – Jim Reeves
- "Think of Me" – Buck Owens
- "The Last Word in Lonesome Is Me" – Eddy Arnold
- "Standing in the Shadows" – Hank Williams Jr.

=== 1967 ===
- "Your Good Girl's Gonna Go Bad" – Tammy Wynette
- "The Cold Hard Facts of Life" – Porter Wagoner
- "Branded Man" – Merle Haggard
- "If You're Not Gone Too Long" – Loretta Lynn
- "Walk Through This World with Me" – George Jones
- "Jackson" – Johnny Cash and June Carter
- "Tonight Carmen" – Marty Robbins
- "It's Such a Pretty World Today" – Wynn Stewart
- "It's the Little Things" – Sonny James
- "Where Does the Good Times Go" – Buck Owens
- "My Elusive Dreams" – David Houston and Tammy Wynette
- "By the Time I Get to Phoenix" – Glen Campbell
- "Long-Legged Guitar Pickin' Man" – Johnny Cash and June Carter
- "The Fugitive" – Merle Haggard
- "I Can't Get There from Here" – George Jones
- "Phantom 309" – Red Sovine
- "Break My Mind" – George Hamilton IV
- "The Party's Over" – Willie Nelson
- "Sam's Place" – Buck Owens
- "Rosanna's Going Wild" – Johnny Cash
- "Does My Ring Hurt Your Finger" – Charley Pride
- "I Don't Wanna Play House" – Tammy Wynette
- "Sing Me Back Home" – Merle Haggard
- "Ode to Billie Joe" – Bobbie Gentry

=== 1968 ===
- "Only Daddy That'll Walk the Line" – Waylon Jennings
- "What's Made Milwaukee Famous (Has Made a Loser Out of Me)" – Jerry Lee Lewis
- "The Image of Me" – Conway Twitty
- "When the Grass Grows Over Me" – George Jones
- "Rocky Top" – The Osborne Brothers
- "Stand by Your Man" – Tammy Wynette
- "Mama Tried" – Merle Haggard
- "How Long Will My Baby Be Gone" – Buck Owens and the Buckaroos
- "The Last Thing on My Mind" – Porter Wagoner and Dolly Parton
- "The Day the World Stood Still" – Charley Pride
- "Harper Valley PTA" – Jeannie C. Riley
- "Wichita Lineman" – Glen Campbell
- "Folsom Prison Blues" – Johnny Cash
- "Fist City" – Loretta Lynn
- "She Still Comes Around (To Love What's Left of Me)" – Jerry Lee Lewis
- "The Carroll County Accident" – Porter Wagoner
- "D-I-V-O-R-C-E" – Tammy Wynette
- "I Take a Lot of Pride in What I Am" – Merle Haggard
- "Foggy Mountain Breakdown" – Flatt & Scruggs
- "Looking at the World Through a Windshield" – Del Reeves
- "Holding On to Nothin'" – Porter Wagoner and Dolly Parton
- "Next in Line" – Conway Twitty
- "Another Place, Another Time" – Jerry Lee Lewis
- "Skip a Rope" – Henson Cargill

=== 1969 ===
- "Workin' Man Blues" – Merle Haggard
- "All I Have to Offer You Is Me" – Charley Pride
- "Bloody Mary Morning" – Willie Nelson
- "My Blue Ridge Mountain Boy" – Dolly Parton
- "One Has My Name (The Other Has My Heart)" – Jerry Lee Lewis
- "Statue of a Fool" – Jack Greene
- "Ruby, Don't Take Your Love to Town" – Kenny Rogers and the First Edition
- "Homecoming" – Tom T. Hall
- "The Ways to Love a Man" – Tammy Wynette
- "I'll Share My World with You" – George Jones
- "Okie From Muskogee" – Merle Haggard
- "A Boy Named Sue" – Johnny Cash
- "Galveston" – Glen Campbell
- "Woman of the World (Leave My World Alone)" – Loretta Lynn
- "She Even Woke Me Up to Say Goodbye" – Jerry Lee Lewis
- "Darling You Know I Wouldn't Lie" – Conway Twitty
- "Just Someone I Used to Know" – Porter Wagoner and Dolly Parton
- "(Margie's At) The Lincoln Park Inn" – Bobby Bare
- "Daddy Sang Bass" – Johnny Cash
- "Ballad of Forty Dollars" – Tom T. Hall
- "Hungry Eyes" – Merle Haggard
- "Singing My Song" – Tammy Wynette
- "Since I Met You Baby" – Sonny James
- "Suspicious Minds" – Elvis Presley

=== 1970 ===
- "Coal Miner's Daughter" – Loretta Lynn
- "There Must Be More to Love Than This" – Jerry Lee Lewis
- "Fifteen Years Ago" – Conway Twitty
- "The Fightin' Side of Me" – Merle Haggard
- "If I Were a Carpenter" – Johnny Cash and June Carter Cash
- "For the Good Times" – Ray Price
- "The Taker" – Waylon Jennings
- "He Loves Me All the Way" – Tammy Wynette
- "Wonder Could I Live There Anymore" – Charley Pride
- "How I Got to Memphis" – Bobby Bare
- "Rose Garden" – Lynn Anderson
- "My Woman My Woman My Wife" – Marty Robbins
- "Mule Skinner Blues" – Dolly Parton
- "A Good Year for the Roses" – George Jones
- "Once More with Feeling" – Jerry Lee Lewis
- "I Know How" – Loretta Lynn
- "Hello Darlin'" – Conway Twitty
- "A Week in a Country Jail" – Tom T Hall
- "Snowbird" – Anne Murray
- "Is Anybody Goin' to San Antone" – Charley Pride
- "Endlessly" – Sonny James
- "Run Woman Run" – Tammy Wynette
- "Brown-Eyed Handsome Man" – Waylon Jennings
- "Sunday Morning Coming Down" – Johnny Cash

=== 1971 ===
- "Man in Black" – Johnny Cash
- "Joshua" – Dolly Parton
- "Lead Me On" – Conway Twitty & Loretta Lynn
- "I'm Just Me" – Charley Pride
- "The Year That Clayton Delaney Died" – Tom T Hall
- "How Much More Can She Stand" – Conway Twitty
- "You're Lookin' At Country" – Loretta Lynn
- "Bright Lights, Big City" – Sonny James
- "I'm a Truck" – Red Simpson
- "Daddy Frank (The Guitar Man)" – Merle Haggard
- "Good Lovin' (Makes It Right)" – Tammy Wynette
- "I Won't Mention It Again" – Ray Price
- "When You're Hot, You're Hot" – Jerry Reed
- "After the Fire Is Gone" – Conway Twitty & Loretta Lynn
- "Would You Take Another Chance on Me" – Jerry Lee Lewis
- "Coat of Many Colors" – Dolly Parton
- "She's All I Got" – Johnny Paycheck
- "Help Me Make It Through the Night" – Sammi Smith
- "Kiss an Angel Good Morning" – Charley Pride
- "Carolyn" – Merle Haggard
- "Easy Loving" – Freddie Hart
- "I Wanna Be Free" – Loretta Lynn
- "Empty Arms" – Sonny James
- "Me and Paul" – Willie Nelson

=== 1972 ===
- "It's Gonna Take a Little Bit Longer" – Charley Pride
- "Rated "X"" – Loretta Lynn
- "It's Not Love" – Merle Haggard
- "(Lost Her Love) On Our Last Date" – Conway Twitty
- "Delta Dawn" – Tanya Tucker
- "Made in Japan" – Buck Owens
- "Soul Song" – Joe Stampley
- "Loving You Could Never Be Better" – George Jones
- "The Happiest Girl in the Whole U.S.A." – Donna Fargo
- "Me and Jesus" – Tom T. Hall
- "I Wonder If They Ever Think of Me" – Merle Haggard
- "Do You Remember These" – Statler Brothers
- "One's on the Way" – Loretta Lynn
- "Good Hearted Woman" – Waylon Jennings
- "The Ceremony" – George Jones and Tammy Wynette
- "Eleven Roses" – Hank Williams Jr.
- "I Can't Stop Loving You" – Conway Twitty
- "(Old Dogs, Children and) Watermelon Wine" – Tom T. Hall
- "Whiskey River" – Johnny Bush
- "Lovin' on Back Streets" – Mel Street
- "A Picture of Me" – George Jones
- "'Til I Get It Right" – Tammy Wynette
- "Woman, Sensuous Woman" – Don Gibson
- "Think About It Darlin'" – Jerry Lee Lewis
