= Billboard Top Country & Western Records of 1950 =

American music chart

These are lists of Billboard magazine's "Top Country & Western Records" and "Top Country & Western Artists" for 1950, ranked by retail sales and juke box plays.

Hank Snow's "I'm Movin' On" was 1950's No. 1 country hit based on retail sales and ranked No. 4 based on juke box plays. Red Foley's "Chattanoogie Shoe Shine Boy" ranked No. 1 based on juke box plays and No. 2 based on retail sales. The year's other top hits included: Moon Mullican's "I'll Sail My Ship Alone" (No. 2 juke box, No. 3 retail); Hank Williams' "Why Don't You Love Me?" (No. 3 juke box, No. 4 retail); and Williams' "Long Gone Lonesome Blues" (No. 5 juke box, No. 5 retail).

The artists with the most songs in the 1950 year-end charts were Red Foley with eight songs, Eddy Arnold with seven, Ernest Tubb with five, Hank Williams with four, and the duet pairing of Margaret Whiting and Jimmy Wakely with four. Billboard also ranked the year's top artists as follows: (1) Red Foley, (2) Ernest Tubb, (3) Hank Williams, (4) Eddy Arnold, and (5) Hank Snow (retail)/Moon Mullican (juke box).

The Decca Records label released 11 of the songs included on the year-end lists, followed by RCA Victor with nine, and Capitol with six.

== Top records ==
Retail year-end	Juke box year-end	Peak (Note: This column recites the record's peak position on Billboard's weekly charts.)	Title	Artist(s)	Songwriter	Label
1	4	1	"I'm Movin' On"	Hank Snow	Hank Snow	RCA Victor
2	1	1	"Chattanoogie Shoe Shine Boy"	Red Foley	Harry Stone, Jack Stapp	Decca
3	2	1	"I'll Sail My Ship Alone"	Moon Mullican	Mullican, Bernard, Mann, Thurston	King
4	3	1	"Why Don't You Love Me?"	Hank Williams	Hank Williams	M-G-M
5	5	1	"Long Gone Lonesome Blues"	Hank Williams	Hank Williams	M-G-M
6	10	1	"Goodnight, Irene"	Red Foley, Ernest Tubb	Lead Belly	Decca
7	13	2	"Cuddle Buggin' Baby"	Eddy Arnold	Red Rowe	RCA Victor
8	24	2	"(Remember Me) I'm the One Who Loves You"	Stuart Hamblen	Stuart Hamblen	Columbia
9	6	1	"Birmingham Bounce"	Red Foley	Hardrock Gunter	Decca
10	17	2	"Lovebug Itch"	Eddy Arnold	Carson, Roy Blotkin	RCA Victor
11	9	1	"M-I-S-S-I-S-S-I-P-P-I"	Red Foley	Hanlon, Ryan, Tierney	Decca
12	12	3	"Throw Your Love My Way"	Ernest Tubb	Tubb, Loys Southerland	Decca
13	8	2	"I Love You Because"	Ernest Tubb	Leon Payne	Decca
14	26	2	"Cincinnati Dancing Pig"	Red Foley	Wood, Lewis	Decca
15	21		"I'll Never Be Free"	Tennessee Ernie Ford, Kay Starr	Benjamin, Weiss	Capitol
16	28	2	"Let's Go to Church (Next Sunday Morning)"	Margaret Whiting, Jimmy Wakely	Steve Allen	Capitol
17	23	6	"Enclosed One Broken Heart"	Eddy Arnold	Red Rowe	RCA Victor
18	NR	3	"Little Angel With the Dirty Face"	Eddy Arnold	Dale Parker	RCA Victor
19	16	3	"Why Should I Cry Over You?"	Eddy Arnold	Zeke Clements	RCA Victor
20	19	1	"Slipping Around"	Margaret Whiting, Jimmy Wakely	Floyd Tillman	Capitol
21	NR		"I Love You Because"	Leon Payne	Leon Payne	Capitol
22	NR	2	"Broken Down Merry-Go-Round"	Margaret Whiting, Jimmy Wakely	Fred Stryker, Arthur Herbert	Capitol
23	20	2	"Letters Have No Arms"	Ernest Tubb	Tubb, Arbie Gibson	Decca
24	NR		"Hillbilly Fever"	Little Jimmy Dickens	Vaughn Horton	Columbia
25	NR		"Just a Closer Walk With Thee"	Red Foley	Traditional	Decca
26	14	2	"Tennessee Border #2	Red Foley, Ernest Tubb	Jimmy Work	Decca
27	NR		"If You've Got the Money I've Got the Time"	Lefty Frizzell	Lefty Frizzell, Jim Beck	Columbia
28	27	4	"Mona Lisa"	Moon Mullican	Ray Evans, Jay Livingston	King
29	NR		"Bonaparte's Retreat"	Pee Wee King	Pee Wee King	RCA Victor
30	NR	1	"Moanin' the Blues"	Hank Williams	Hank Williams	M-G-M
NR	7	1	"Take Me in Your Arms"	Eddy Arnold	Cindy Walker	RCA Victor
NR	11		"Rag Mop"	Johnnie Lee Wills	Willis, Anderson	Bullett
NR	15	9	"Sugarfoot Rag"	Red Foley	Hank Garland, Vaughn Horton	Decca
NR	18		"Bloodshot Eyes"	Hank Penny	Hank Penny, Ruth Hall	King
NR	22		"Blues Stay Away From Me"	Delmore Brothers	Delmore, Raney, Delmore, Glover	King
NR	25	2	"My Bucket's Got a Hole in It"	Hank Williams	Clarence Williams	M-G-M
NR	29	3	"The Gods Were Angry With Me"	Margaret Whiting, Jimmy Wakely	Foreman Bill, Roma	Capitol
NR	30	6	"Mama and Daddy Broke My Heart"	Eddy Arnold	Spade Cooley	RCA Victor

== See also ==
- List of Billboard number-one country songs of 1950
- 1950 in country music
