= List of Billboard number-one country songs of 1950 =

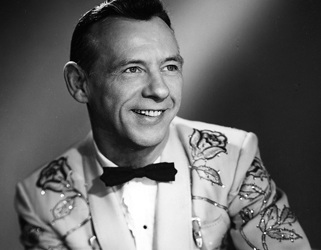
Hank Snow had lengthy runs at the top of all three charts with "I'm Movin' On".

In 1950, Billboard magazine published three charts covering the best-performing country music songs in the United States: Most-Played Juke Box (Country & Western) Records, Best-Selling Retail Folk (Country & Western) Records and Country & Western Records Most Played By Folk Disk Jockeys. The juke box chart was compiled based on a "weekly survey among a selected group of jukebox operators whose locations require country and western records", the best sellers chart based on a "survey among a selected group of retail stores, the majority of whose customers purchase country and western records", and the jockeys chart based on a "weekly survey among a select list of over 400 disk jockeys specializing in country and western tunes". All three charts are considered part of the lineage of the current Hot Country Songs chart, which was first published in 1958.

In the first issue of Billboard of 1950, Christmas songs were at number one on two charts, with "Blue Christmas" by Ernest Tubb in the top spot on the juke box chart and Gene Autry's recording of "Rudolph the Red-Nosed Reindeer" atop the jockeys chart. The number one on the best sellers chart was "Slipping Around" by Margaret Whiting and Jimmy Wakely, which had held the top spot since the previous October. The longest-running number one of 1950 on all three charts was "I'm Movin' On" by Canadian singer Hank Snow, which spent 14 weeks in the top spot on the juke box chart, 18 on the best sellers listing, and 17 on the jockeys chart. The song would spend three further weeks at number one on the best sellers chart in 1951, tying the record set in 1948 by Eddy Arnold's "I'll Hold You in My Heart (Till I Can Hold You in My Arms)" for the highest number of weeks spent at number one on any one of Billboard's country singles charts. Red Foley spent the highest total number of weeks at number one on both the juke box and best sellers charts in 1950, topping each for 19 weeks. He also had the highest number of individual chart-toppers on each of the two listings, with four and three respectively. On the jockeys chart, Hank Williams was the only artist with more than one number one hit, and he also spent the most weeks at number one, totalling 19 weeks in the top spot with his three chart-toppers.

Five artists achieved their debut country number ones in 1950, including Hank Snow with "I'm Movin' On". Leon Payne spent two non-consecutive weeks atop the jockeys chart in January with "I Love You Because". Payne, who was better known as a songwriter for other country artists, achieved the unusual feat of reaching number one with his only charting song as a performer. In the same week that Payne reached number one on the jockeys chart, the Delmore Brothers gained their first and only number one when "Blues, Stay Away From Me" topped the juke box chart. Moon Mullican reached number one on both the juke box and best sellers charts with "I'll Sail My Ship Alone", his only number one. Finally, Lefty Frizzell made his first appearance at number one in December when "If You've Got the Money I've Got the Time", his debut single, was the final juke box chart-topper of the year. It was the first of five chart-toppers which Frizzell achieved in a little over a year before his chart performance began to decline. "Moanin' the Blues" by Hank Williams was the last number one of 1950 on the jockeys chart and Hank Snow's "I'm Movin' On" was the year's final best sellers chart-topper.

== Chart history ==
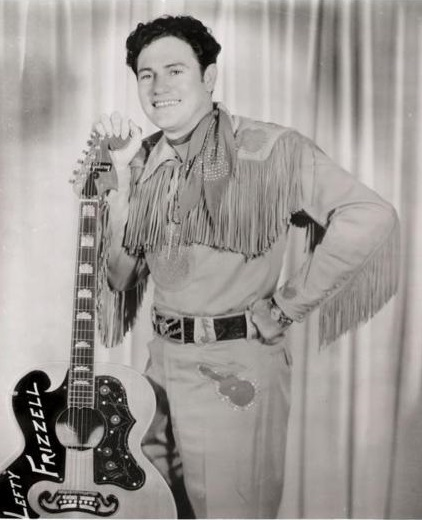
Lefty Frizzell ended the year at number one with his debut chart-topper, "If You've Got the Money I've Got the Time".

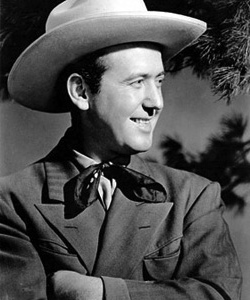
Red Foley had three number ones on the best sellers chart.

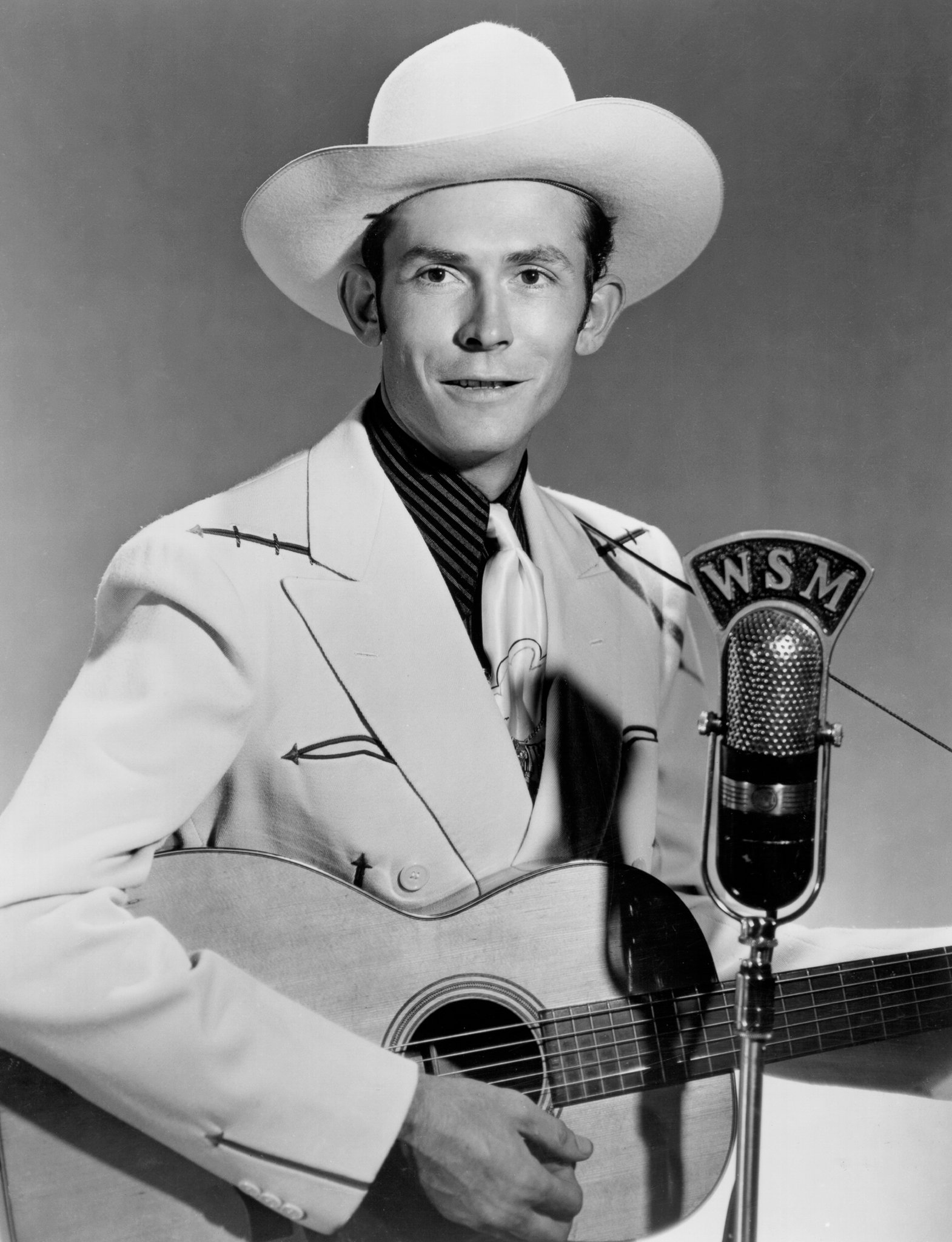
Hank Williams spent a total of 19 weeks at number one on the jockeys chart.

Chart history
Issue date	Juke Box		Best Sellers		Jockeys		Ref.
Issue date	Title	Artist(s)	Title	Artist(s)	Title	Artist(s)	Ref.
January 7	"Blue Christmas"	Ernest Tubb	"Slipping Around"	Margaret Whiting and Jimmy Wakely	"Rudolph the Red-Nosed Reindeer"	Gene Autry	
January 14	"Blues, Stay Away From Me"	The Delmore Brothers	"Slipping Around"	Margaret Whiting and Jimmy Wakely	"I Love You Because"	Leon Payne	
January 21	"Slipping Around"	Margaret Whiting and Jimmy Wakely	"Slipping Around"	Margaret Whiting and Jimmy Wakely	"Chattanoogie Shoe Shine Boy"	Red Foley	
January 28	"Take Me in Your Arms and Hold Me"	Eddy Arnold	"Slipping Around"	Margaret Whiting and Jimmy Wakely	"I Love You Because"	Leon Payne	
February 4	"Chattanoogie Shoe Shine Boy"	Red Foley	"Chattanoogie Shoe Shine Boy"	Red Foley	"Chattanoogie Shoe Shine Boy"	Red Foley	
February 11	"Chattanoogie Shoe Shine Boy"	Red Foley	"Chattanoogie Shoe Shine Boy"	Red Foley	"Chattanoogie Shoe Shine Boy"	Red Foley	
February 18	"Chattanoogie Shoe Shine Boy"	Red Foley	"Chattanoogie Shoe Shine Boy"	Red Foley	"Chattanoogie Shoe Shine Boy"	Red Foley	
February 25	"Chattanoogie Shoe Shine Boy"	Red Foley	"Chattanoogie Shoe Shine Boy"	Red Foley	"Chattanoogie Shoe Shine Boy"	Red Foley	
March 4	"Chattanoogie Shoe Shine Boy"	Red Foley	"Chattanoogie Shoe Shine Boy"	Red Foley	"Chattanoogie Shoe Shine Boy"	Red Foley	
March 11	"Chattanoogie Shoe Shine Boy"	Red Foley	"Chattanoogie Shoe Shine Boy"	Red Foley	"Chattanoogie Shoe Shine Boy"	Red Foley	
March 18	"Chattanoogie Shoe Shine Boy"	Red Foley	"Chattanoogie Shoe Shine Boy"	Red Foley	"Chattanoogie Shoe Shine Boy"	Red Foley	
March 25	"Chattanoogie Shoe Shine Boy"	Red Foley	"Chattanoogie Shoe Shine Boy"	Red Foley	"Chattanoogie Shoe Shine Boy"	Red Foley	
April 1	"Chattanoogie Shoe Shine Boy"	Red Foley	"Chattanoogie Shoe Shine Boy"	Red Foley	"Chattanoogie Shoe Shine Boy"	Red Foley	
April 8	"Chattanoogie Shoe Shine Boy"	Red Foley	"Chattanoogie Shoe Shine Boy"	Red Foley	"Chattanoogie Shoe Shine Boy"	Red Foley	
April 15	"Chattanoogie Shoe Shine Boy"	Red Foley	"Chattanoogie Shoe Shine Boy"	Red Foley	"Chattanoogie Shoe Shine Boy"	Red Foley	
April 22	"Chattanoogie Shoe Shine Boy"	Red Foley	"Chattanoogie Shoe Shine Boy"	Red Foley	"Long Gone Lonesome Blues"	Hank Williams	
April 29	"Chattanoogie Shoe Shine Boy"	Red Foley	"Long Gone Lonesome Blues"	Hank Williams	"Chattanoogie Shoe Shine Boy"	Red Foley	
May 6	"Long Gone Lonesome Blues"	Hank Williams	"Long Gone Lonesome Blues"	Hank Williams	"Long Gone Lonesome Blues"	Hank Williams	
May 13	"Long Gone Lonesome Blues"	Hank Williams	"Long Gone Lonesome Blues"	Hank Williams	"Long Gone Lonesome Blues"	Hank Williams	
May 20	"Long Gone Lonesome Blues"	Hank Williams	"Long Gone Lonesome Blues"	Hank Williams	"Long Gone Lonesome Blues"	Hank Williams	
May 27	"Long Gone Lonesome Blues"	Hank Williams	"Birmingham Bounce"	Red Foley	"Long Gone Lonesome Blues"	Hank Williams	
June 3	"Birmingham Bounce"	Red Foley	"Long Gone Lonesome Blues"	Hank Williams	"Long Gone Lonesome Blues"	Hank Williams	
June 10	"Birmingham Bounce"	Red Foley	"Birmingham Bounce"	Red Foley	"Long Gone Lonesome Blues"	Hank Williams	
June 17	"I'll Sail My Ship Alone"	Moon Mullican	"Why Don't You Love Me"	Hank Williams	"Long Gone Lonesome Blues"	Hank Williams	
June 24	"I'll Sail My Ship Alone"	Moon Mullican	"Birmingham Bounce"	Red Foley	"Why Don't You Love Me"	Hank Williams	
July 1	"I'll Sail My Ship Alone"	Moon Mullican	"Birmingham Bounce"	Red Foley	"Why Don't You Love Me"	Hank Williams	
July 8	"I'll Sail My Ship Alone"	Moon Mullican	"Why Don't You Love Me"	Hank Williams	"Why Don't You Love Me"	Hank Williams	
July 15	"M-I-S-S-I-S-S-I-P-P-I"	Red Foley	"Why Don't You Love Me"	Hank Williams	"Why Don't You Love Me"	Hank Williams	
July 22	"Why Don't You Love Me"	Hank Williams	"I'll Sail My Ship Alone"	Moon Mullican	"Why Don't You Love Me"	Hank Williams	
July 29	"Why Don't You Love Me"	Hank Williams	"Why Don't You Love Me"	Hank Williams	"Why Don't You Love Me"	Hank Williams	
August 5	"Why Don't You Love Me"	Hank Williams	"Why Don't You Love Me"	Hank Williams	"Why Don't You Love Me"	Hank Williams	
August 12	"Why Don't You Love Me"	Hank Williams	"Why Don't You Love Me"	Hank Williams	"Why Don't You Love Me"	Hank Williams	
August 19	"Why Don't You Love Me"	Hank Williams	"I'm Movin' On"	Hank Snow	"Why Don't You Love Me"	Hank Williams	
August 26	"Goodnight, Irene"	Red Foley and Ernest Tubb	"Goodnight, Irene"	Red Foley and Ernest Tubb	"Why Don't You Love Me"	Hank Williams	
September 2	"Goodnight, Irene"	Red Foley and Ernest Tubb	"Goodnight, Irene"	Red Foley and Ernest Tubb	"I'm Movin' On"	Hank Snow	
September 9	"Goodnight, Irene"	Red Foley and Ernest Tubb	"I'm Movin' On"	Hank Snow	"I'm Movin' On"	Hank Snow	
September 16	"I'm Movin' On"	Hank Snow	"I'm Movin' On"	Hank Snow	"I'm Movin' On"	Hank Snow	
September 23	"I'm Movin' On"	Hank Snow	"I'm Movin' On"	Hank Snow	"I'm Movin' On"	Hank Snow	
September 30	"I'm Movin' On"	Hank Snow	"I'm Movin' On"	Hank Snow	"I'm Movin' On"	Hank Snow	
October 7	"I'm Movin' On"	Hank Snow	"I'm Movin' On"	Hank Snow	"I'm Movin' On"	Hank Snow	
October 14	"I'm Movin' On"	Hank Snow	"I'm Movin' On"	Hank Snow	"I'm Movin' On"	Hank Snow	
October 21	"I'm Movin' On"	Hank Snow	"I'm Movin' On"	Hank Snow	"I'm Movin' On"	Hank Snow	
October 28	"I'm Movin' On"	Hank Snow	"I'm Movin' On"	Hank Snow	"I'm Movin' On"	Hank Snow	
November 4	"I'm Movin' On"	Hank Snow	"I'm Movin' On"	Hank Snow	"I'm Movin' On"	Hank Snow	
November 11	"I'm Movin' On"	Hank Snow	"I'm Movin' On"	Hank Snow	"I'm Movin' On"	Hank Snow	
November 18	"I'm Movin' On"	Hank Snow	"I'm Movin' On"	Hank Snow	"I'm Movin' On"	Hank Snow	
November 25	"I'm Movin' On"	Hank Snow	"I'm Movin' On"	Hank Snow	"I'm Movin' On"	Hank Snow	
December 2	"I'm Movin' On"	Hank Snow	"I'm Movin' On"	Hank Snow	"I'm Movin' On"	Hank Snow	
December 9	"I'm Movin' On"	Hank Snow	"I'm Movin' On"	Hank Snow	"I'm Movin' On"	Hank Snow	
December 16	"I'm Movin' On"	Hank Snow	"I'm Movin' On"	Hank Snow	"I'm Movin' On"	Hank Snow	
December 23	"If You've Got the Money I've Got the Time"	Lefty Frizzell	"I'm Movin' On"	Hank Snow	"I'm Movin' On"	Hank Snow	
December 30	"If You've Got the Money I've Got the Time"	Lefty Frizzell	"I'm Movin' On"	Hank Snow	"Moanin' the Blues"	Hank Williams	

== See also ==
- List of Billboard Top Country & Western Records and Artists of 1950
- 1950 in music
- 1950 in country music
- List of artists who reached number one on the U.S. country chart
