= Terry Shand =

American pianist, songwriter, vocalist and bandleader

Terence Alister Shand (October 1, 1904 – November 11, 1977) was an American pianist, vocalist, bandleader and songwriter.

== Biography ==
Terry Shand was born in Uvalde, Texas. He started his career by 1920, playing piano at the Kelly Field Hostess Club, where his mother was manager, and then toured with such musicians as Jack Teagarden, Wingy Manone and Muggsy Spanier. Around 1930, he joined Freddy Martin's orchestra, before forming his own band later in the decade and recording for Decca Records.

He was also a prolific and respected songwriter. Among his compositions are "I'm Gonna Lock My Heart (And Throw Away the Key)", co-written with Jimmy Eaton and first recorded by Billie Holiday in 1938; "Dance with a Dolly (With a Hole in Her Stocking)", written with Eaton and Mickey Leader, and first recorded by Tony Pastor in 1940; and "You Don't Have to Be a Baby to Cry", written with Bob Merrill. The latter song was recorded in 1950 by Jimmy Dorsey's Orchestra, with Shand on vocals, Moon Mullican, Ernest Tubb and most successfully by English vocal duo The Caravelles in 1963.

His wife, Violet Ott (née Gossett, 1902–1983), collaborated on some of his compositions and toured with him. He lived for most of his life in Texas, New Mexico, and Miami, Florida. He died in hospital in Houston in 1977, aged 73.
