= Take Me in Your Arms =

Take Me in Your Arms may refer to:

- Take Me in Your Arms (Lil Suzy song)
- Take Me in Your Arms (Eddy Arnold song)
- Take Me in Your Arms (Rock Me a Little While), a song written by Holland–Dozier–Holland
- Take Me in Your Arms (film), a 1954 Mexican drama film
