= Eddy's Song =

1953 single by Eddy Arnold

"Eddy's Song" is a 1953 single by Eddy Arnold, written by Charlie Grean and Cy Coben. "Eddy's Song" spent three weeks at number one on the Country & Western chart and spent a total of thirteen weeks on the chart.

== Background ==
The song's lyrics contains the titles of Arnold's best-known songs to that time, intertwined to affirm a man's dedication to his significant other. Included in the song's lyrics are the names of 10 of the 17 number one hits he had achieved on the Billboard country charts through late 1952, when Arnold recorded and released the song.

Songs included are "Lovebug Itch," "Molly Darling," "I Wanna Play House With You," "Take Me in Your Arms and Hold Me," "Bouquet Of Roses," "Anytime," "There's No Wings On My Angel," "Easy on the Eyes," "There's Been a Change in Me," "A Full Time Job," "That's How Much I Love You," "It's a Sin," "What Is Life Without Love," "Just a Little Lovin' (Will Go a Long Way)," "Older and Bolder," "Don't Ever Take the Ribbons From Your Hair," "Rockin' Alone," "Easy Rockin' Chair," "Don't Rob Another Man's Castle," "Chained to a Memory," "Bundle of Southern Sunshine" and "Cuddle Buggin' Baby"

"Eddy's Song" went on to become Arnold's 18th No. 1 song on the Billboard country chart, and was listed as the No. 11 song on the magazine's year-end retail chart for country records and No. 18 for jukebox plays.
