= The Definitive Collection (Ernest Tubb album) =

Compilation album by Ernest Tubb
- Released: June 6, 2006
- Recorded: 1941–1966
- Genres: Country, honky tonk
- Label: MCA Nashville

The Definitive Collection is a compilation album by American country singer Ernest Tubb, released in 2006 (see 2006 in music). The album includes duets with Red Foley and Loretta Lynn.

== Reception ==
Professional ratings
Review scores
Source	Rating
Allmusic	5/5 stars

In his Allmusic review, Stephen Thomas Erlewine said, "Given the length of Tubb's career, there are certainly plenty of charting hits and terrific music that didn't make the cut, but this has the great majority of his biggest and best hits, making this the best single-disc Tubb collection yet released..."

== Track listing ==
1. "Walking the Floor Over You" (Ernest Tubb) – 2:38
2. "Mean Mama Blues" (Tubb) – 2:59
3. "Our Baby's Book" (Tubb) – 3:08
4. "You Nearly Lose Your Mind" (Tubb) – 2:49
5. "Soldier's Last Letter" (Redd Stewart, Tubb) – 3:15
6. "Tomorrow Never Comes" (Tubb, Johnny Bond) – 3:08
7. "It's Been So Long Darling" (Tubb) – 3:15
8. "Rainbow at Midnight" (Lost John Miller) – 3:10
9. "Filipino Baby" (Billy Cox, Clarke Van Ness) – 3:02
10. "Drivin' Nails in My Coffin" (Gerald Irby) – 2:56
11. "Have You Ever Been Lonely (Have You Ever Been Blue)" (George Brown, Peter De Rose) – 2:53
12. "Let's Say Goodbye Like We Said Hello" (Tubb, Jimmie Skinner) – 3:01
13. "Slipping Around" (Floyd Tillman) – 2:55
14. "Blue Christmas" (Billy Hayes, Jay W. Johnson) – 2:48
15. "Letters Have No Arms" (Cindy Walker) – 3:08
16. "I Love You Because" (Leon Payne) – 2:43
17. "Goodnight, Irene" (Huddie Ledbetter, Alan Lomax) – 3:04
18. "You Don't Have to Be a Baby to Cry" (Bob Merrill, Terry Shand) – 2:25
19. "Two Glasses, Joe" (Cindy Walker) – 2:18
20. "Yellow Rose of Texas" (Don George) – 2:28
21. "Half a Mind" (Roger Miller) – 2:29
22. "Thanks a Lot" (Eddie Miller, Don Sessions) – 2:34
23. "Mr. and Mrs. Used to Be" (Billy Joe Deaton) – 2:44
24. "Waltz Across Texas" (Talmadge Tubb) – 2:39
25. "Sweet Thang" (with Loretta Lynn) (Nat Stuckey) – 2:39
