= I'm Gonna Lock My Heart (And Throw Away the Key) =

Songs

Single by Billie Holiday
- A-side: "I Wish I Had You"
- Released: 1938
- Recorded: June 23, 1938
- Genre: Jazz
- Label: Vocalion Records
- Songwriters: Jimmy Eaton, Terry Shand

"I'm Gonna Lock My Heart (And Throw Away the Key)" is a song written by Jimmy Eaton and Terry Shand. It was first recorded in 1938 by Billie Holiday for Vocalion Records.

Holiday recorded the song in New York City on June 23, 1938, with musicians including Charlie Shavers (trumpet), Buster Bailey (clarinet), Babe Russin (tenor saxophone), Claude Thornhill (piano), John Kirby (bass), Cozy Cole (drums), and an unidentified guitarist. Her recording was commercially successful, reaching No.2 on the pop charts in 1938 according to Joel Whitburn. Another version, by Henry Busse on Decca Records, reached No.7 on the charts the same year.

Later recordings include those by Eddy Arnold (1953), Carmen McRae (1962), and Elkie Brooks with Humphrey Lyttelton (2002).
