= Why Should I Cry Over You? =

Song by Eddy Arnold
- Released: 1950
- Genre: Country
- Length: 2:34
- Label: RCA Victor
- Songwriter(s): Zeke Clements

"Why Should I Cry Over You?" is a country music song written by Zeke Clements, sung by Eddy Arnold, and released on the RCA Victor label. In April 1950, it reached No. 3 on the country juke box chart. It spent 13 weeks on the charts and was the No. 16 juke box country record of 1950.

== See also ==
- Billboard Top Country & Western Records of 1950
