= Shoo-Fly Pie and Apple Pan Dowdy =

Song by Dinah Shore
- Published: 1945
- Genre: Pop
- Composer: Guy Wood
- Lyricist: Sammy Gallop

"Shoo-Fly Pie and Apple Pan Dowdy" is a popular song about Pennsylvania Dutch cooking, with music by Guy Wood and words by Sammy Gallop. It was published in 1945.

== Recording history ==
The song became a major hit in 1946 both for Dinah Shore and the Stan Kenton orchestra featuring June Christy on vocals. It also went on to be recorded by Guy Lombardo and his Royal Canadians, and by Ella Fitzgerald.

Dinah Shore's recording (released by Columbia Records as catalog number 36943), reached the Billboard magazine Best Seller chart on April 4, 1946 and lasted 2 weeks on the chart, peaking at number 7. It was narrowly preceded by Stan Kenton's recording with June Christy (Capitol Records, catalog number 235), which first arrived in the Billboard chart on March 14 and remained for 4 weeks, peaking at number 8. In the Cash Box survey, where all versions were combined at one position, the song reached number 4 for the year.

== Background ==
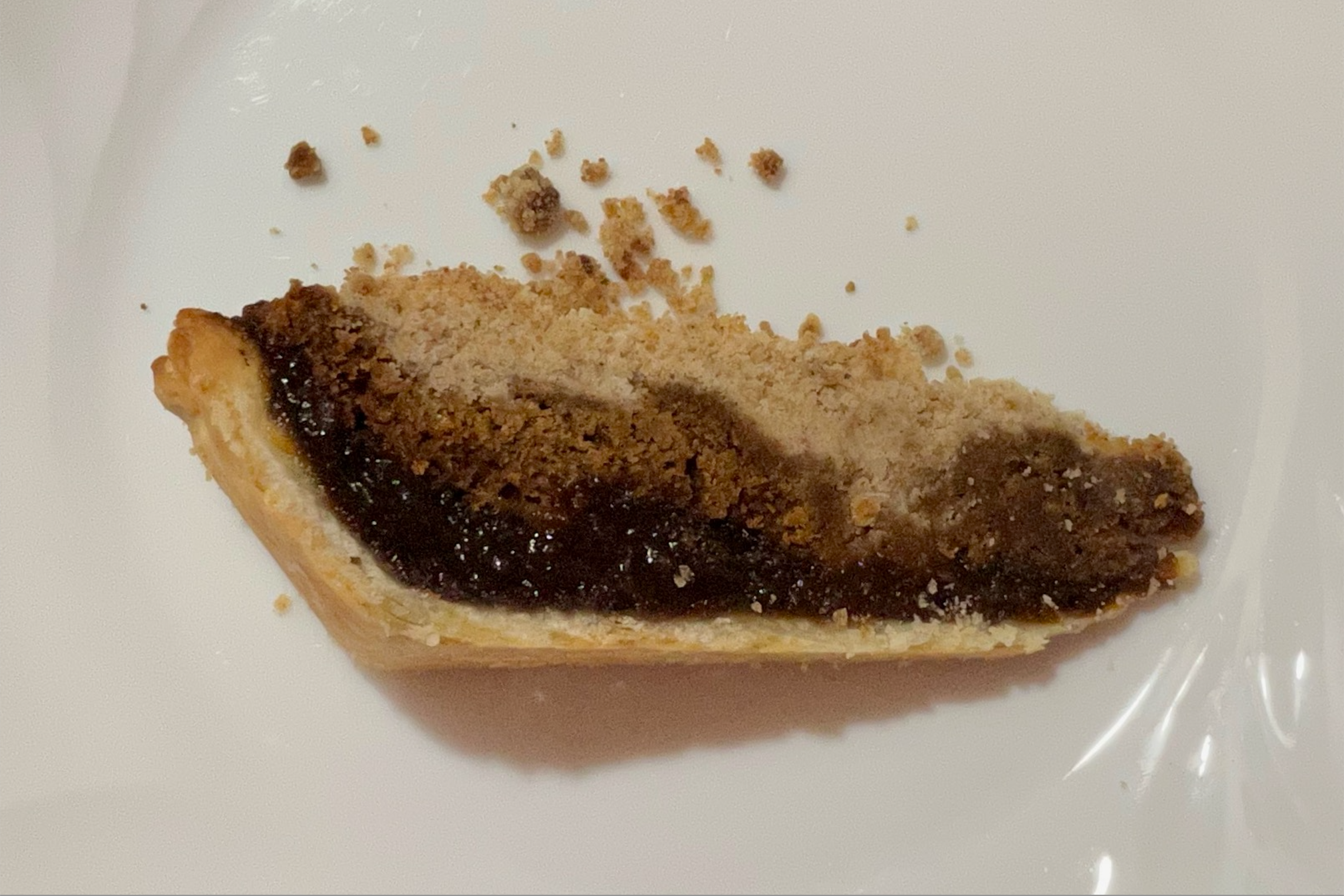
Slice of shoofly pie

Shoo-fly pie is a molasses pie common to both Pennsylvania Dutch cuisine cooking and southern (US) cooking. Apple pan dowdy (or Apple pandowdy) is a baked apple pastry traditionally associated with Pennsylvania Dutch cooking, with a recipe dating to (according to Crea) colonial times.

== In popular culture ==
The song is frequently mentioned in John Updike's 1988 novel Rabbit at Rest as a favorite childhood song of the protagonist, Pennsylvania native Harry "Rabbit" Angstrom.

The 'Two Fat Ladies' refer to this song in their cookbook Obsessions, as well as singing the song and cooking apple pan dowdy on an episode of their television show.
