= My Favorites of Hank Williams =

Studio album by George Jones
- Released: 1962
- Recorded: September 1962
- Studio: Columbia (Nashville, Tennessee)
- Genre: Country
- Length: 28:14
- Label: United Artists
- Producer: Pappy Daily

George Jones chronology
Homecoming in Heaven (1962)	My Favorites of Hank Williams (1962)	I Wish Tonight Would Never End (1963)

My Favorites of Hank Williams is an album by American country music artist George Jones. It was released in 1962 on the United Artists record label. It was Jones' second tribute to the music of Hank Williams.

== Reception ==
Professional ratings
Review scores
Source	Rating
Allmusic	3/5 stars

AllMusic's Stephen Erlewine observes that My Favorites "does differ from the previous Mercury recordings in terms of production – the UA release is slightly smoother, yet it is still firmly in the honky tonk tradition" and comments that Jones delivers the songs "with affection and grit, making the record a thoroughly enjoyable listen."

== Track listing ==
All songs by Hank Williams, except where noted.

No.	Title	Writer(s)	Length
1.	"Wedding Bells"	Claude Boone	2:10
2.	"I Heard You Crying in Your Sleep"		2:10
3.	"I Just Don't Like This Kind of Living"		2:29
4.	"You Win Again"		2:27
5.	"I Could Never Be Ashamed of You"		2:22
6.	"You're Gonna Change"		2:14
7.	"Lonesome Whistle"	Jimmie Davis, Williams	2:20
8.	"A House Without Love"		2:24
9.	"Your Cheatin' Heart"		2:28
10.	"They'll Never Take Her Love from Me"	Leon Payne	2:29
11.	"Mansion On The Hill"	Fred Rose, Williams	2:21
12.	"Take These Chains From My Heart"	Hy Heath, Rose	2:50
