= Cincinnati Dancing Pig =

Song by Red Foley
- Released: 1950
- Genre: Country
- Length: 2:47
- Label: Decca
- Songwriters: Guy Wood, Al Lewis

"Cincinnati Dancing Pig" is a country music song written by Guy Wood (music) and Al Lewis (lyrics), sung by Red Foley, and released on the Decca label. It was a novelty song about a dancing pig that included squealing and grunting sounds.

In September 1950, Foley's recording of the song reached No. 2 on the country best seller chart. It spent 12 weeks on the charts and was the No. 14 best selling country record of 1950.

Music critic Carol Ferrell wrote that Foley's "contagious 'slapping' rhythm" from "Chattanoogie Shoe Shine Boy" had "invaded the barnyard".

The song was also covered by Vic Damone, Teresa Brewer, and Gene Krupa (vocals by Bobby Soots).

The American jug band and musical humor group, Cincinnati Flying Pigs, was named after the song.

== See also ==
- Billboard Top Country & Western Records of 1950
