= Take Me in Your Arms (Eddy Arnold song) =

1949 song by Zeke Clements

"Take Me in Your Arms and Hold Me"

Single by Eddy Arnold, The Tennessee Plowboy and His Guitar
- B-side: Mama and Daddy Broke My Heart
- Released: December 2, 1949
- Recorded: September 13, 1949
- Genre: Country
- Length: 2:34
- Label: RCA Victor 21-0146
- Songwriter(s): Zeke Clements

Eddy Arnold, The Tennessee Plowboy and His Guitar singles chronology
"I'm Throwing Rice (At The Girl That I Love)" (1949)	"Take Me in Your Arms and Hold Me" (1949)	"Little Angel with the Dirty Face" (1950)

"Take Me in Your Arms" is a country music song written by Cindy Walker, sung by Eddy Arnold, and released on the RCA Victor label. In December 1949, it reached No. 1 on the country juke box chart. It spent 17 weeks on the charts and was the No. 7 juke box country record of 1950.

== See also ==
- Billboard Top Country & Western Records of 1950
