= The Caravelles =

British duo girl band

The Caravelles, Lois Wilkinson (born 3 April 1944 in Sleaford, Lincolnshire, England) and Andrea Simpson (born 9 September 1946 in Finchley, London), were a British female duo, best known for their 1963 hit single "You Don't Have to Be a Baby to Cry".

== Career ==
The Caravelles were named after the Sud Aviation Caravelle, a French aircraft. Their best known song, "You Don't Have to Be a Baby to Cry", was originally a regional hit for Moon Mullican, and then was used as the B-side to Tennessee Ernie Ford's hit single "Sixteen Tons". The Caravelles' version of "You Don't Have to Be a Baby to Cry" reached No. 3 on the U.S. Billboard Hot 100 and No. 6 on the UK Singles Chart. Carrying over into the next year, the song became the first British record on the Hot 100's top 40 in 1964, beating Cliff Richard by two weeks and the Beatles by three weeks, making the Caravelles the first British act to have a national top 40 hit in America that year.

They could not maintain their success, and Lois Wilkinson began recording solo under the name Lois Lane. The album Lois Lane, featuring 12 songs (mostly cover versions, though with one original, "One Upon a Time" by Wilkinson) arranged in orchestral middle-of-the-road style by Johnny Arthey, was issued in October 1968. Andrea Simpson continued to use the band name "The Caravelles" through the 1980s in groups with other musicians, and still performed occasionally into the 1990s.

== Partial discography ==
=== Singles ===
Year	Single	Chart Positions		
Year	Single	US	UK	AU
1963	"You Don't Have to Be a Baby to Cry"	3	6	48
1963	"I Really Don't Want to Know"	-	-	-
1964	"Have You Ever Been Lonely"	94	-	93
1964	"You Are Here"	-	-	-
1964	"Don't Blow Your Cool"	-	-	-
1964	"I Don't Care If the Sun Don't Shine"	-	-	-
1964	"True Love Never Runs Smooth"	-	-	-
1967	"Hey Mama You've Been on My Mind"	-	-	-
1967	"I Want to Love You Again"	-	-	-
1968	"The Other Side of Love"	-	-	-

=== Albums ===
Year	Album	Chart Positions
Year	Album	US BB
1963	You Don't Have to Be a Baby to Cry	127
1973	Dawning Of The Day	—
