= Tennessee Border No. 2 =

"Tennessee Border #2"

Song by Red Foley, Ernest Tubb
- Released: 1949
- Genre: Country
- Length: 2:38
- Label: Decca
- Songwriter: Jimmy Work

"Tennessee Border #2" is a country music song written by Jimmy Work and sung as a duet by Red Foley and Ernest Tubb. It was released in December 1949 on the Decca label with "Don't Be Ashamed of Your Age" as the "B" side. It peaked at No. 2 on the country best seller and disc jockey charts. It spent 10 weeks on the charts and was ranked as the No. 14 juke box song (No. 26 retail) on the Billboard Top Country & Western Records of 1950.

The song's comical lyrics describe a man's courtship of a large married woman named Helen. Her nose looked like a big banana, her neck like a roll of bologna, and her head like a watermelon. She was so fat that he thought he was seeing double, he couldn't put his arm around her, and she wore a girdle around her Tennessee border. He took her out one night, and they were confronted by her huband who used brass knuckles to scatter his teeth on the Tennessee border.

The song was included as part of multiple compilation albums, including "Red and Ernie" (1954), "The Very Best of Ernest Tubb" (1998), and "The Texas Troubadour" (2003).

== See also ==
- Billboard Top Country & Western Records of 1950
