= Let's Go to Church (Next Sunday Morning) =

Song by Margaret Whiting, Jimmy Wakely
- Released: 1950
- Genre: Country
- Length: 2:29
- Label: Capitol
- Songwriter(s): Steve Allen

"Let's Go to Church (Next Sunday Morning)" is a country music song written by Steve Allen, sung by Margaret Whiting and Jimmy Wakely, and released on the Capitol label. In April 1950, it reached No. 2 on the country best seller chart. It spent 10 weeks on the charts and was the No. 16 best selling country record of 1950.

== See also ==
- Billboard Top Country & Western Records of 1950
