= Broken Down Merry-Go-Round =

Song by Margaret Whiting, Jimmy Wakely
- Released: 1950
- Genre: Country
- Length: 2:32
- Label: Capitol
- Songwriter(s): Fred Stryker, Arthur Herbert

"Broken Down Merry-Go-Round" is a country music song written by Fred Stryker and Arthur Herbert, sung by Margaret Whiting and Jimmy Wakely, and released on the Capitol label. In February 1950, it reached No. 2 on the country best seller chart. It spent nine weeks on the charts and was the No. 22 best selling country record of 1950.

== See also ==
- Billboard Top Country & Western Records of 1950
