= Hillbilly Fever =

Song by Little Jimmy Dickens
- Released: 1950
- Genre: Country
- Length: 2:30
- Label: Columbia
- Songwriter(s): Vaughn Horton

"Hillbilly Fever" is a country music song written by Vaughn Horton, sung by Little Jimmy Dickens, and released on the Columbia label. It was recorded on February 14, 1950. The lyrics reflect the growing popularity of country music in the postwar years, as "hillbilly fever's going round".

The lyrics include references to popular country songs of the time, including "Honky Tonkin'", "Don't Rob Another Man's Castle", "Slippin' Around", "I'm Throwing Rice", "Sunday Down in Tennessee", "Lovesick Blues", and "Chattanoogie Shoe Shine Boy".

In April 1950, it reached No. 3 on the country disc jockey chart. It spent 10 weeks on the charts and was the No. 24 best selling country record of 1950.

With its country boogie sound and relentless drive, it has been cited as having "anticipated" or marked "the first stirrings" of rockabilly music.

== See also ==
- Billboard Top Country & Western Records of 1950
