= Hardrock Gunter =

American singer-songwriter

Background information
- Birth name: Sidney Louie Gunter Jr.
- Also known as: Sidney Jo Lewis
- Born: February 27, 1925; Birmingham, Alabama, U.S.
- Died: March 15, 2013 (aged 88)
- Genres: Rockabilly, western swing, rock
- Occupation(s): Musician, singer, songwriter
- Instrument(s): Guitar, vocals
- Years active: 1939–1960s
- Labels: Bama, Decca, King, Sun, Cross Country, Emperor, Island, Bronjo, GeeGee, Rollercoaster
- Website: www.hardrockgunter.com

Sidney Louie Gunter Jr. (February 27, 1925 – March 15, 2013), known as Hardrock Gunter, was a singer, songwriter and guitarist whose music at the turn of the 1950s prefigured rock and roll and rockabilly music.

== Biography ==
He was born in Birmingham, Alabama. He formed his first group, the Hoot Owl Ramblers, in his teens, and also performed a solo novelty act in talent shows. In 1939, he joined Happy Wilson's Golden River Boys, a country swing group, and acquired his nickname when a van trunk lid fell on him before a show and he never flinched. After wartime service he returned to work with the group, before leaving to become their agent and starting to appear on local TV.

As a popular local personality, he was approached to record by Birmingham's Bama label. He recorded his own song "Birmingham Bounce" in early 1950, the Golden River Boys being renamed the Pebbles on the record. It became a regional hit, and led to over 20 cover versions, the most successful being by Red Foley, whose version reached no.1 on the Billboard country chart and no.14 on the pop chart. Gunter's original version has become regarded as a contender for the first rock and roll record, predating "Rocket 88" by a year.

Gunter followed up with "Gonna Dance All Night", one of the first records to feature the actual words "rock'n'roll". When the Bama label folded, Gunter signed to Decca, and his 1951 duet with Roberta Lee, "Sixty Minute Man," was one of the first country records to cross over to R&B audiences. In 1953 he began working at a radio station, and also remade "Gonna Dance All Night" and recorded "Jukebox Help Me Find My Baby", both of which were issued by Sun Records and became regional hits. In 1958 he was one of the first musicians to use both echo and overdub on his recording of "Boppin' to Grandfather's Clock", released under the name Sidney Jo Lewis.

He continued to record with limited success, and in the 1960s left the music business to develop a career in insurance, based in Colorado. He retired to Rio Rancho, New Mexico. In 1995 he began to perform again at festivals in England, Germany and the United States. He died in 2013, from complications of pneumonia, at the age of 88.
