= Guy Wood =

English musician and songwriter (1911–2001)

- Born: Guy B. Wood; 24 July 1911; Manchester, England, United Kingdom
- Died: 23 February 2001 (aged 89)
- Genres: Saxophone
- Occupations: Musician, songwriter

Guy B. Wood (24 July 1911 – 23 February 2001) was a musician and songwriter born in Manchester, England. Wood started his career in music playing saxophone in dance bands in England. He moved to the United States in the 1930s, where he worked for Paramount Pictures and Columbia Pictures as well as serving as bandleader at the Arcadia Ballroom in New York. His songs include "Till Then", "My One and Only Love", "Shoo-Fly Pie and Apple Pan Dowdy". His song "Till Then" reached the pop charts three times (in 1944, 1954, and 1963). Wood also wrote songs for Captain Kangaroo and the Radio City Music Hall. Wood died on 23 February 2001.

== Songs ==
- "Till Then" 1944
- "Shoo-Fly Pie and Apple Pan Dowdy" 1946
- "Music from Beyond the Moon" 1947
- "Cincinnati Dancing Pig" 1950
- "Vanity" 1951
- "Hobo Boogie" 1951
- "Faith Can Move Mountains" 1952
- "My One and Only Love" 1952
- "French Foreign Legion" 1958
- "The Wedding" 1958
- "Look for Me (I'll Be Around)"(with Sylvia Dee) 1963
