= Anticipation Blues =

Single by Tennessee Ernie Ford
- B-side: "The Cry of the Wild Goose"
- Released: 1949
- Genre: Country
- Length: 2:10
- Label: Capitol
- Songwriters: Tennessee Ernie Ford, Cliffie Stone

"Anticipation" is a song written by Tennessee Ernie Ford and Cliffie Stone and performed by Ford. Released on Capitol Records in November 1949, the song peaked in December 1949 at No. 3 on the folk disc jockeys chart and No. 5 on the folk best sellers chart.

The lyrics refer to anticipation of being a father during a wife's pregnancy. He yells like a hound when he finds out he is going to be a father, deals with her ravings and cravings as the pregnancy progresses, paces nervously as he awaits the delivery, and at the conclusion is told he is the daddy of a pair of bouncing twins.
