= Enclosed, One Broken Heart =

"Enclosed One Broken Heart"

Song by Eddy Arnold
- Released: 1950
- Genre: Country
- Length: 2:06
- Label: RCA Victor (no. 48-0342)
- Songwriter: Red Rowe

"Enclosed, One Broken Heart" is a country music song written by Red Rowe, sung by Eddy Arnold, and released on the RCA Victor label. In July 1950, it reached No. 6 on the country juke box chart. It spent 12 weeks on the charts and was the No. 17 best selling country record of 1950.

== See also ==
- Billboard Top Country & Western Records of 1950
