= Bloodshot Eyes (song) =

1950 song by Hank Penny

Song by Hank Penny
- Released: 1949
- Genre: Country
- Length: 2:38
- Label: King
- Songwriters: Hank Penny, Ruth Hall

"Bloodshot Eyes" is a country music song written by Hank Penny and Ruth Hall, sung by Penny, and released on the King label. In February 1950, it reached No. 4 on the country juke box chart. It spent 12 weeks on the charts and was the No. 18 juke box country record of 1950.

It was recorded in 1951 by Wynonie Harris. The song was also a popular song in the Caribbean, and has been recorded in Jamaica by Denzil Laing's mento group the Wrigglers featuring guitarist Ernest Ranglin, and by the Montego Beach Hotel Calypsonians, also in Bermuda by the Talbot Brothers and Sidney Bean.

Also recorded by London Pub-Rock band [Bees Make Honey] on their 1973 album [Music Every Night]

== See also ==
- Billboard Top Country & Western Records of 1950
- Dicogs entry for [Bees Make Honey]
