= Why Should We Try Anymore =

Single by Hank Williams with His Drifting Cowboys
- B-side: "They'll Never Take Her Love from Me"
- Published: April 7, 1950 Acuff-Rose Publications, Inc.
- Released: August 1950
- Recorded: January 9, 1950
- Studio: Castle Studio, Nashville
- Genre: Country & Western, Honky-tonk, Country blues
- Length: 2:36
- Label: MGM 10760
- Songwriter: Hank Williams
- Producer: Fred Rose

Hank Williams with His Drifting Cowboys singles chronology
| "Why Don't You Love Me" (1950) | "Why Should We Try Anymore" (1950) | "Moanin' the Blues" (1950) |

"Why Should We Try Anymore" is a song written by Hank Williams and released as a single on MGM Records in 1950.

== Background ==
"Why Should We Try Anymore" was a wintry variation on Williams' previous single "Why Don't You Love Me," and its four verses, based loosely on "I'm Not Coming Home Any More," limned a bleak picture of a marriage gone sour." As was often the case with Hank's singles, the pessimistic ballad did not fare as well on the singles chart as his up-tempo singles, peaking at #9. In fact, the B-side, a cover of Leon Payne's "They'll Never Take Her Love from Me," outperformed the A-side, rising to #5. The A-side was recorded in Nashville at Castle Studio with Fred Rose producing on January 9, 1950 and featured Jerry Rivers (fiddle), Don Helms (steel guitar), Bob McNett (lead guitar), Jack Shook (rhythm guitar), and Ernie Newton (bass).

== Cover versions ==
- Ferlin Husky cut a version of the song.
- Hank Williams, Jr. and Lois Johnson recorded the song as a duet.
- Waylon Jennings recorded the tune for his 1992 Williams tribute LP.
- The song appears on the 1995 Willie Nelson box set A Classic and Unreleased Collection.
