= Lovebug Itch =

Song by Eddy Arnold
- Released: 1950
- Genre: Country
- Length: 2:20
- Label: RCA Victor
- Songwriter(s): Jenny Lou Carson, Roy Botkin

"Lovebug Itch" is a country music song written by Jenny Lou Carson and Roy Botkin, sung by Eddy Arnold, and released on the RCA Victor label. In September 1950, it reached No. 2 on the country charts. It spent 16 weeks on the charts and was the No. 10 best selling country record of 1950.

== See also ==
- Billboard Top Country & Western Records of 1950
