= I Just Don't Like This Kind of Living =

1949 song by Hank Williams

Single by Hank Williams With His Drifting Cowboys
- B-side: "May You Never Be Alone"
- Published: December 14, 1949 Acuff-Rose Publications
- Released: January 1950
- Recorded: August 30, 1949
- Studio: Herzog Studio, Cincinnati
- Genre: Country & Western, Honky-tonk, Country blues
- Length: 2:47
- Label: MGM
- Songwriter: Hank Williams

Hank Williams With His Drifting Cowboys singles chronology
"My Bucket's Got a Hole in It" (1949)	"I Just Don't Like This Kind of Living" (1950)	"Long Gone Lonesome Blues" (1950)

"I Just Don't Like This Kind of Living" is a song written by Hank Williams and released as his thirteenth single on MGM Records in January 1950. The song peaked at #5 on the Best Selling Retail Folk Records chart.

== Background ==
The song expresses frustration and resentment towards a frigid woman who will not reciprocate the narrator's affection. The song, which alludes to "fussin' and fightin'" and contains the line "You ain't never bin known to be wrong, and I ain't never bin right," was likely inspired by Hank's tumultuous relationship with his wife at the time, Audrey Williams, with biographer Colin Escott musing, "Audrey's thoughts can only be guessed at as she heard the substance of their domestic disputes on the radio, particularly as only one side ever got aired." Williams recorded the song on August 30, 1949, at Herzog Studio in Cincinnati, Ohio (the same session that produced the B-side "I'm So Lonesome I Could Cry"). He is backed by members of the Pleasant Valley Boys – Zeke Turner (lead guitar), Jerry Byrd (steel guitar), and Louis Innis (rhythm guitar) – as well as Tommy Jackson (fiddle) and Ernie Newton (bass)."

== Cover versions ==
- George Jones recorded a version for his 1962 album My Favorites of Hank Williams on United Artists.
- In 1965 the song appeared as an overdubbed duet by Williams and his son Hank Williams, Jr.
- Also, on February 15; 1965, a version by Johnny Horton was released by Columbia Records. Horton's parts had been recorded in October 1960, just days before his untimely death. (Incidentally, Horton was married to Williams' second wife, Billie Jean.) Additional instrumentation by session musicians was recorded on October 5, 1964, and overdubbed for the 1965 release, in much the same way many of Hank Williams' unfinished tracks had been completed.
- A cover by Dave Dudley was released in 1981 on the compilation album, Six Days on the Road (not to be confused with the similarly named Dave Dudley Sings Six Days on the Road, which was released in 1963).

== Bibliography ==
- Escott, Colin (2004). Hank Williams: The Biography. Back Bay. ISBN 0-316-73497-7.
