= You Don't Have to Be a Baby to Cry =

Single by The Caravelles
- B-side: "The Last One to Know"
- Released: 12 July 1963
- Recorded: 1963
- Genre: Pop
- Length: 2:01
- Label: Smash
- Songwriter(s): Bob Merrill, Terry Shand

The Caravelles singles chronology
"You Don't Have to Be a Baby to Cry" (1963)	"I Really Don't Want to Know" / "I Was Wrong" (1963)

"You Don't Have to Be a Baby to Cry" is a song written by Bob Merrill and Terry Shand, and first recorded in 1950 by Moon Mullican.

== Other 1950 recordings ==
- Jimmy Dorsey (with vocals by Terry Shand)
- Ernest Tubb – peaked at No. 10 on the Most Played Juke Box Folk chart

== The Caravelles recording ==
British girl group the Caravelles recorded a version of the song in 1963. The single reached No. 6 on the UK Singles Chart in 1963. In the US, it peaked at No. 3 on the U.S. Billboard Hot 100, and No. 2 on the Middle-Road Singles chart.On the New Zealand Lever Hit Parade chart it reached #8
