= Letters Have No Arms =

Song by Ernest Tubb
- Released: 1950
- Genre: Country
- Length: 3:07
- Label: Decca
- Songwriters: Ernest Tubb, Arbie Gibson

"Letters Have No Arms" is a country music song written by Ernest Tubb and Arbie Gibson and popularized in a single sung by Tubb. It was released on the Decca label (no. 46207) with "I'll Take a Back Seat for You" as the "B" side. It peaked in February 1950, reaching No. 2 on the country juke box chart, No. 3 on the disc jockey chart, and No. 5 on the best sellers chart. It spent 17 weeks on the charts and was ranked No. 23 on the Billboard Top Country & Western Records of 1950.

The lyrics tell of receiving a letter from a distant sweetheart. While the letter cheered him, he gets so lonesome and letters have no arms and never bring him the touch of her hand or her sweet loving charms.

The song has been covered by multiple artists, including Ray Price, Faron Young, George Hamilton IV, Del McCoury, Billy Byrd, the Osborne Brothers, and Vernon Oxford.

The song was also included on multiple compilations albums, including "The Ernest Tubb Story" (1959) "Country Music Hall of Fame Series" (1987), and "The Definitive Collection" (2006).

== See also ==
- Billboard Top Country & Western Records of 1950
