= The Gods Were Angry with Me =

"The Gods Were Angry With Me"

Song by Margaret Whiting, Jimmy Wakely
- Released: 1950
- Genre: Country
- Length: 2:30
- Label: Capitol
- Songwriter(s): Watt Watkins and Roma

"The Gods Were Angry With Me" is a country music song written by Watt Watkins and Roma, sung by Margaret Whiting and Jimmy Wakely, and released on the Capitol label. In February 1950, it reached No. 3 on the country best seller chart. It spent seven weeks on the charts and was the No. 29 juke box country record of 1950.

== See also ==
- Billboard Top Country & Western Records of 1950
