= I'll Sail My Ship Alone =

1950 song

"I'll Sail My Ship Alone" is a 1950 song written by Moon Mullican (sometimes credited as "Morry Burns"), Henry Bernard (sometimes credited as "Henry Glover"), Lois Mann (sometimes credited as "Sydney Nathan") and Henry Thurston, and popularized by Moon Mullican.

== Chart performance ==
The song was Mullican's most successful release, reaching number one on the Billboard Country & Western chart for a single week, and spending a total of nine months on that listing. "I'll Sail My Ship Alone" crossed over to the pop chart, reaching number 17.

== Other recordings ==
- Patsy Cline recorded this song on her last recording session, before she died in a plane crash.
- It was recorded by Jerry Lee Lewis in 1958.
- Hank Williams
- Skeets McDonald
- Tiny Hill
- Ferlin Husky
- George Jones
- Slim Whitman
- Patrick Wall
- Mickey Gilley
- Leon Russell (as "Hank Wilson").

Preceded by "Why Don't You Love Me" by Hank Williams with His Drifting Cowboys	Billboard Best Selling Retail Country & Western Records number-one single June 17, 1950	Succeeded by "Why Don't You Love Me" by Hank Williams with His Drifting Cowboys
