= Throw Your Love My Way =

Song by Ernest Tubb
- Released: 1950
- Genre: Country
- Length: 2:37
- Label: Decca
- Songwriters: Ernest Tubb, Loys Southerland

"Throw Your Love My Way" is a country music song written by Ernest Tubb and Loys Southerland and popularized by a single sung by Tubb. It was released in June 1950 on the Decca label with "Give Me a Little Old Fashioned Love" as the "B" side. It peaked at No. 3 on the country disc jockey chart, No. 4 on the juke box chart, and No. 5 on the best seller chart. It spent 15 weeks on the charts and ranked No. 12 on the Billboard Top Country & Western Records of 1950.

The song's lyrics are in the form of a courting song. He compares his intended to a speckled pup with a smile that would "turn you up and down". He will give his share of heaven and get down on his knees if she will "throw your pretty love at me."

The song was also recorded by Tubb in a version with the Andrews Sisters. It was included in multiple compilations albums, including "Hittin' the Road" (1965), "The Daddy of 'Em All - Ernest Tubb 1940-1952" (1974), "Country Music Hall of Fame", (1987), "Country USA 1950" (1991 Time-Life), "Let's Say Goodbye Like We Said Hello" (1991 Bear Family), "Waltz Across Texas" (1998 Bear Family), and "The Definitive Hits Collection" (2001).

== See also ==
- Billboard Top Country & Western Records of 1950
