= Little Angel with the Dirty Face =

1950 song by Dale Parker

Song by Eddy Arnold
- Released: 1950
- Genre: Country
- Length: 2:34
- Label: RCA Victor
- Songwriter(s): Dale Parker

"Little Angel with the Dirty Face" is a country music song written by Dale Parker, sung by Eddy Arnold, and released on the RCA Victor label. In April 1950, it reached No. 3 on the country best seller chart. It spent 12 weeks on the charts and was the No. 18 best selling country record of 1950.

== See also ==
- Billboard Top Country & Western Records of 1950
