= Moanin' the Blues =

Single by Hank Williams with His Drifting Cowboys
- B-side: "Nobody's Lonesome for Me"
- Published: October 25, 1950 Acuff-Rose Publications
- Released: October 1950
- Recorded: August 31, 1950
- Studio: Castle Studio, Nashville
- Genre: Country & Western, Honky-tonk, Country blues
- Length: 2:23
- Label: MGM 10832
- Songwriter: Hank Williams
- Producer: Fred Rose

Hank Williams with His Drifting Cowboys singles chronology
"Why Should We Try Anymore" (1950)	"Moanin' the Blues" (1950)	"Cold, Cold Heart" (1951)

"Moanin' the Blues" is a song by Hank Williams. It became his fourth number one single on MGM Records in 1950.

== Background ==
"Moanin' the Blues" was recorded in Nashville on August 31 with Fred Rose producing. The session personnel remains somewhat inconclusive: Jerry Rivers (fiddle); Don Helms (steel guitar); Sammy Pruett (electric guitar); probably Jack Shook (rhythm guitar); Ernie Newton or "Cedric Rainwater," a.k.a. Howard Watts (bass); Fred Rose or Owen Bradley (organ); and possibly Farris Coursey (drums). Like his number one hit "Long Gone Lonesome Blues" earlier in the year, "Moanin' the Blues" followed the same blueprint as "Lovesick Blues," and showcases his skills as a singer and Rose's ear for production:

"Once again, he left plenty of windows for yodels and flashes of trailing falsetto. The end result was greater than the sum of its parts. It rocked and rolled. The bridge was particularly compelling; Hank yodeled over the stops, setting up the smooth segue back to the verses. The rhythm, carried by Jack Shook's prominently mic'd acoustic guitar up on the neck, was reinforced by big band drummer Farris Coursey playing drums on the snare."

"Moanin' the Blues" is one of only two songs that feature Williams working with drums; the other is "Kaw-Liga." Moanin the Blues would also be the title of Williams second studio album, released in 1952.

== Cover versions ==
- Marty Robbins recorded the song for Columbia on January 10, 1957.
- Hank Williams Jr. recorded the song for MGM in 1963.
- Ace Cannon recorded an instrumental version on his album Moanin' Sax.
- Mel Tillis and the Statesiders covered the song in 1975.
- Merle Haggard and the Strangers recorded the song in 1977.
- Charley Pride recorded the song in 1980.
- Hank Williams III recorded the song as an overdubbed duet with his grandfather on the 1996 album Three Hanks: Men with Broken Hearts.

== Chart performance ==
Chart (1950)	Peak position
U.S. Billboard Hot Country Singles	1
