= (Remember Me) I'm the One Who Loves You =

1950 song by Stuart Hamblen

"(Remember Me) I'm The One Who Loves You"

Single by Stuart Hamblen
- B-side: "I’ll Find You"
- Released: 1950
- Genre: Country
- Label: Columbia
- Songwriter: Stuart Hamblen

"(Remember Me) I'm The One Who Loves You"

Single by Ernest Tubb
- B-side: "I Need Attention Bad"
- Released: 1950
- Genre: Country
- Length: 2:55
- Label: Decca
- Songwriter: Stuart Hamblen

"(Remember Me) I'm The One Who Loves You"

Single by Dean Martin

from the album (Remember Me) I'm the One Who Loves You
- B-side: "Born to Lose"
- Released: 1965
- Genre: Pop
- Length: 2:24
- Label: Reprise
- Songwriter: Stuart Hamblen
- Producer: Jimmy Bowen

"(Remember Me) I'm The One Who Loves You" is a song written and originally sung by Stuart Hamblen, which he released in 1950. The song was a hit for Ernest Tubb the same year, and Dean Martin in 1965. Johnny Cash also covered it on his 1957 debut album Johnny Cash with His Hot and Blue Guitar!

== Stuart Hamblen version ==
Hamblen's version reached No. 2 on Billboard's chart of "Country & Western Records Most Played by Folk Disk Jockeys", No. 3 on Billboard's chart of "Best-Selling Retail Folk (Country & Western) Records", and No. 4 on Billboard's chart of "Most Played Juke Box Folk (Country & Western) Records."

Hamblen's version was also ranked No. 8 on Billboard's ranking of 1950's "Top Country & Western Records According to Retail Sales" and No. 24 on Billboard's ranking of 1950's "Top Country & Western Records According to Juke Box Plays."

== Ernest Tubb version ==
Ernest Tubb released a version of the song in 1950, which reached No. 5 on Billboard's chart of "Most Played Juke Box Folk (Country & Western) Records" and No. 7 on Billboard's chart of "Best-Selling Retail Folk (Country & Western) Records."

== Dean Martin version ==
In 1965, the song was released by Dean Martin. The song spent 7 weeks on the Billboard Hot 100 chart, peaking at No. 32, while reaching No. 7 on Billboard's Easy Listening chart, and No. 14 on Canada's R.P.M. Play Sheet.
