= The Delmore Brothers =

American country music duo

Background information
- Origin: Elkmont, Alabama, United States
- Genres: Country
- Years active: 1926–1952
- Labels: Columbia, Bluebird, Decca, King

Alton Delmore (December 25, 1908 – June 9, 1964) and Rabon Delmore (December 3, 1916 – December 4, 1952), billed as The Delmore Brothers, were country music pioneer singer-songwriters and musicians who were stars of the Grand Ole Opry in the 1930s. The Delmore Brothers, together with other brother duos such as the Louvin Brothers, the Blue Sky Boys, the Monroe Brothers (Birch Monroe, Charlie Monroe and Bill Monroe), the McGee Brothers, and The Stanley Brothers, had a profound impact on the history of country music and American popular music. The duo performed extensively with old time fiddler Arthur Smith as the Arthur Smith Trio throughout the 1930s.

== Biography ==
The brothers were born into poverty in Elkmont, Alabama, United States, as the sons of tenant farmers amid a rich tradition of gospel music and Appalachian folk. Their mother, Mollie Delmore, wrote and sang gospel songs for their church. The Delmores blended gospel-style harmonies with the quicker guitar work of traditional folk music and the blues to help create the still-emerging genre of country. In addition to the regular six-string acoustic guitar, the duo was one of the few to use the rare tenor guitar, a four-string instrument that had primarily been used previously in vaudeville shows.

In 1925, 16-year-old Alton wrote his first song ("Bound for the Shore"), which he co-wrote with his mother. It was published by Athens Music Co.

In 1930, the brothers entered a contest in Athens, Alabama and won first prize after almost being beaten by a comedy act in multiple rounds of tie breakers.

The Brothers did their first recording session for Columbia Records in 1931, recording "Got The Kansas City Blues" and "Alabama Lullaby," which became their theme song. They signed a contract with Victor's budget label Bluebird in 1933 and became regulars on the Grand Ole Opry. Within three years, they had become the most popular act on the show.

In 1934, Arthur Smith (later known as "Fiddlin' Arthur Smith" to distinguish him from Arthur "Guitar Boogie" Smith) began touring with The Delmore Brothers. The trio recorded together for the next three years and had played together on over 52 sides together under both The Delmore Brothers and The Arthur Smith Trio. Their first session together was in 1935 for Bluebird. Talent scouts were impressed with Arthur's playing and recorded his first sides with Alton and Rabon backing him up. During a recording session in 1937 for Bluebird, Alton had a cold forcing him to sing lower which ended up damaging his vocal chords. After this, Alton was not able to sing as high ever again.

Disagreements with Opry management led to the brothers leaving the show in 1938. After leaving the Opry, the brothers moved to WPTF in Raleigh, North Carolina. While they continued to play and record music throughout the 1940s, they never achieved the same level of success they had with the Grand Ole Opry.

In 1941, their song "When It's Time for the Whippoorwill to Sing" made the Billboard "Hillbilly" top three.

In 1942, the brothers were officially signed to King Records. However, many of the early King Records that predate this signing were released under pen names. "Someday You'll Pay," "Remember I Feel Lonesome, Too," "Going Back to the Blueridge Mountains," and "The Last Old Shovel" were released under Alton's Pseudonym "Jim Scott".

While a myth exists stating that all of the King sides were recorded in Cincinnati, this is untrue. The sides were recorded wherever the Delmores were living at the time. The brothers tended to move two to three times a year which meant there were a lot of places that were sites of the recordings. The sides were recorded in Indianapolis, Memphis, Chattanooga, Jackson, Mississippi, Athens, Alabama, Covington, Fort Smith, Del Rio, and Houston.

Their "Freight Train Boogie" (recorded for the King label in 1946) is regarded by some as the first rock and roll record. Their best-known song, "Blues Stay Away From Me" (also on King, 1949), was covered by Johnny Burnette and The Rock and Roll Trio, Gene Vincent and the Blue Caps, The Louvin Brothers, The Browns, Les Paul and Mary Ford, Doc Watson, The Notting Hillbillies, Marshall Chapman, and The Everly Brothers.

Over the course of their careers, the Delmores wrote more than one thousand songs. Some of the most popular were "Brown's Ferry Blues," "Gonna Lay Down My Old Guitar" and "Fifteen Miles from Birmingham." Their guitar-based recordings were key in establishing the guitar as central in country and, later, rockabilly and rock and roll. A third instrument featured in many of their postwar records is the harmonica of Wayne Raney.

Rabon died of lung cancer in 1952, a day after his 36th birthday. Following Rabon's death, Alton suffered a heart attack, the loss of his father and his daughter Susan, all within a three-year period. He moved back to Huntsville, Alabama. He taught some guitar, did odd jobs, and devoted his creative energies to writing prose. He wrote a series of short stories and his autobiography, Truth is Stranger than Publicity, published posthumously in 1977 by the Country Music Foundation.

== Legacy ==
The Delmore Brothers were inducted into the Nashville Songwriters Hall of Fame in October 1971, as well as the Alabama Music Hall of Fame in 1989 and the Country Music Hall of Fame in 2001. Their pioneering contribution to the genre has been recognized by the Rockabilly Hall of Fame.

The Brothers' later records with electric guitars and boogie beat landed them a spot on the Rolling Stone's History of Rock n' Roll.

Bob Dylan was quoted in the Chicago Tribune, on November 10, 1985 as saying, "The Delmore Brothers, God, I really loved them! I think they've influenced every harmony I've ever tried to sing."

The Brothers recorded over 200 sides with major labels as the Delmore Brothers, and many more under pseudonyms such as Alton's most famous persona, "Jim Scott". Alton wrote many songs that were never released.

== Partial discography ==
=== Singles ===
- Got The Kansas City Blues (Columbia, 1931)
- Lonesome Yodel Blues (Bluebird, 1934)
- The Frozen Girl (Bluebird, 1934)
- Brown's Ferry Blues (Bluebird, 1934)
- Brown's Ferry Blues, Part 2 (Bluebird, 1935)
- Down South (Bluebird, 1935)
- I'm Gonna Change My Way (Bluebird, 1936)
- Till The Roses Bloom Again (Bluebird, 1937)
- Ain't It Hard To Love (Bluebird, 1938)
- I'm Alabama Bound (Bluebird, 1939)
- Silver Dollar (Decca, 1940)
- Prisoner's Farewell (King, 1944)
- Freight Train Boogie (King, 1946)
- Mobile Boogie (King, 1947)
- Blues Stay Away From Me (King, 1949)
- Pan American Boogie (King, 1950)
- I'll Be There (King, 1951)
- Good Time Saturday Night (King, 1952)
- Muddy Water (King, 1952)

=== Albums ===
- Sacred Songs (King, 1957)
- In Memory (King, 1964)
- In Memory, Vol. 2 (King, 1964)
- Wonderful Sacred Songs (King, 1966)
- When They Let The Hammer Fall (Bear Family, 1984)
- Lonesome Yodel Blues (Old Homestead, 1985)
- Classic Cuts: 1933-1941 (JSP, 2003)
- Fifty Miles To Travel (Ace, 2005)
- The Delmore Brothers, Vol. 2: The Later Years 1933-1952 (JSP, 2007)
- Blues Stay Away From Me (Jasmine, 2008)
- Classic Cuts, Vol. 3: More From The 1930s Plus (JSP, 2008)

== Awards ==
- Citation of Achievement from Broadcast Music Inc. presented to Alton Delmore for "Beautiful Brown Eyes", 1951.
- Induction into the Nashville Songwriters Hall of Fame, 1971
- Induction into the Alabama Country Music Hall of Fame, 1987
- Induction into the Alabama Music Hall of Fame, 1989
- Independent Country Music Association-Germany, Induction into the Hall of Fame. 2000
- Independent Country Music Association-Germany, Artists of the 20th Century, 2000
- Inducted into the Country Music Hall of Fame, October 4, 2001
- National Academy of Recording Arts & Sciences "Blues Stay Away From Me", Delmore Brothers, King, 1949, was inducted into the Grammy Hall of Fame, January 2007
- Limestone County Fiddlers Convention, c. 1920s, First Prize, duo awarded one sack of flour and a new pair of socks. <Alton Delmore, 1959>
