= Stuart Hamblen =

American singer-songwriter (1908–1989)

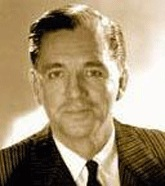

Background information
- Born: Carl Stuart Hamblen; October 20, 1908; Kellyville, Texas, U.S.
- Died: March 8, 1989 (aged 80) Santa Monica, California, U.S.
- Genres: Country, cowboy, gospel
- Occupation: Singer-songwriter
- Years active: 1926–1989
- Labels: Decca, RCA Victor, 4 Star

Carl Stuart Hamblen (October 20, 1908 – March 8, 1989) was an American entertainer who in 1926 became one of radio's first singing cowboys, going on to become a singer, actor, radio show host and songwriter. He converted to Christianity under the ministry of Billy Graham, becoming a temperance movement supporter and running several times for political office. He is best known as the composer of the Southern gospel hymn "It Is No Secret (What God Can Do)" (1951) and the song "This Ole House" (1954); which was most notably recorded by Rosemary Clooney and Shakin' Stevens.

Hamblen ran for U.S. president in 1952 as the nominee of the Prohibition Party; having been nominated at the party's 1951 national convention.

== Early life ==
Hamblen was born into the family of an itinerant Methodist preacher on October 20, 1908, in Kellyville, Texas. He married Suzy Daniels and they had two children. Hamblen's father was J. H. Hamblen, a minister in the Methodist Church in Texas, who in 1946 founded the Evangelical Methodist Church denomination in Abilene.

== Career ==
In 1931, Hamblen began hosting the popular radio program Family Album in California. He also composed music and acted in motion pictures with cowboy stars, including Gene Autry, Roy Rogers and John Wayne. In 1934, he became the first artist signed by the American subsidiary of Decca Records.

Hamblen did not cope well with the pressures of his high-profile career and sought relief in alcohol. Many times his drinking landed him in jail for public brawling and other destructive behavior. The Texas State Historical Association reports that Hamblen identified himself as the "original juvenile delinquent". Because Hamblen was hugely popular, his radio sponsors regularly bailed him out of jail and smoothed things over. For a while, he ventured into horse racing as an owner. Inevitably, Hamblen's drinking and gambling problems severely affected his life and career. In 1949 after years of struggle with alcohol, Hamblen converted to Christianity at a Billy Graham crusade in Los Angeles, and was soon fired from his radio program after refusing to do beer commercials. He subsequently gave up gambling and horse racing, and entered Christian broadcasting with his radio show The Cowboy Church of the Air, which ran until 1952.

== Personal life ==
During a 1949 crusade in Los Angeles, Graham called Hamblen's conversion "the turning point" in the Billy Graham Evangelistic Association's ministry, as the crowds had been rather small before Hamblen accepted Christ. Graham said Hamblen was the No. 1 radio personality in Los Angeles, which drew in crowds. He went on to relate an anecdote about Hamblen's hunting skills, instrumental in Hamblen's capture of a wild panther in the Los Angeles area prior to the crusade. That evening, also Graham's first coast-to-coast television broadcast, Hamblen shared about his faith and sang/spoke his signature hymn "It Is No Secret (What God Can Do)".

Stuart Hamblen died March 8, 1989, in Santa Monica, California, of brain cancer.

== Music ==
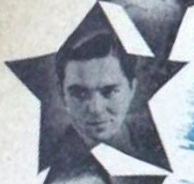
Hamblen in the 1940s

In his early career as a singing cowboy Hamblen composed the song "Texas Plains". It was this song that Patsy Montana reworked into her million-seller hit "I Want to Be a Cowboy's Sweetheart" (1935). Hamblen wrote the hit songs "This Ole House" (1954) (popularized by Rosemary Clooney, among others) and "Open Up Your Heart (And Let the Sunshine In)" (not to be confused with the song from the Broadway musical Hair). Other songs include "Hell Train", "It Is No Secret (What God Can Do)" and "Blood on Your Hands".

"It Is No Secret" was written following his acceptance of Christ and a spiritual conversation with John Wayne. After accepting the Lord, Hamblen was fired from his position as disc jockey because he refused to do alcohol commercials. John Wayne offered him a drink shortly thereafter, and Hamblen refused, saying, "It is no secret what the Lord can do." John Wayne said, "You should write a song by that title." The song would go on to be sung by popular singers Rosemary Clooney, Kate Smith, Jim Reeves, Wayne Newton, Leslie Uggams, Jo Stafford & Gordon MacRae (duet), Anne Murray, Tom Netherton, Eddy Arnold, Pat Boone, Johnny Cash, Elvis Presley, Hank Snow and Ernest Tubb.

"This Ole House" was inspired during a hunting trip in the High Sierras with John Wayne and guide Monte Wolfe. The two men came upon what looked like an abandoned shack, wherein they found the body of an elderly man, apparently dead of natural causes. Hamblen came up with the lyrics to the song while riding horseback down the mountain, and composed the melody within a week. In addition to being a No. 1 hit for Clooney, it was later recorded by Roberta Sherwood and The Statler Brothers, among many others. In 1981, a version performed by Welsh rock'n'roll singer Shakin' Stevens topped the UK Singles Chart.

Hamblen, circa 1951

In 1955, Hamblen had a hit single with "Open Up Your Heart (And Let the Sunshine In)" (B-side "The Lord is Counting on You"), performed along with his family under the name "The Cowboy Church Sunday School." Hamblen was accompanied by wife Suzy, daughters Veeva Suzanne and Obee Jane (Lisa), and two of the girls' friends. The song was recorded at the phonograph speed of 33 RPM so that, played back at the normal 7-inch–single speed of 45 RPM, it sounds like children singing. The tune hit No. 8 on the Billboard Hot 100 pop charts in 1955. "Open Up Your Heart (And Let the Sunshine In)" was sung on an episode of the television cartoon series The Flintstones in the mid-1960s by characters Pebbles and Bamm-Bamm.

Hamblen wrote the lyrics to the Christmas cult favorite "Hardrock, Coco and Joe". An animated Christmas cartoon short based on the song was created in the mid-1950s. Its running time is about 2 minutes and 45 seconds. The full title is Hardrock, Coco and Joe - The Three Little Dwarfs, but is commonly called Hardrock, Coco and Joe, after the song title.

One of Hamblen's few secular songs to become popular was "(Remember Me) I'm the One Who Loves You", recorded by Ernest Tubb, Jimmy Dean, Red Foley and others, and made into a gold record by Dean Martin in a 1965 Reprise recording.

The Hamblen family participated in the Pasadena Rose Parade for many years, riding Peruvian Paso horses.

At Hamblen's well-attended funeral in Los Angeles, a recording of his was played; Billy Graham gave the eulogy. Hamblen is buried at Forest Lawn Memorial Park-Hollywood Hills.

The Stuart Hamblen Collection, which includes Hamblen's original sound recordings, resides at the University of North Carolina at Chapel Hill within the Southern Folklife Collection.

== Awards ==
Hamblen was inducted into the Nashville Songwriters Hall of Fame in 1970, was presented the ACM Pioneer Award 1972, received the Gene Autry Golden Boot Award 1988, and was inducted into the Texas Country Music Hall of Fame 2001. He later received a star on Hollywood's Walk of Fame. He was inducted into the Gospel Music Hall of Fame in 1994 and the Western Music Hall of Fame in 1999.

Jefferson, Texas (near Hamblen's birth home of Kelleyville, Texas), celebrates "Stuart Hamblen Days" each year. A bronze plaque dedication took place in the city park in 1998, sponsored by a local opera house.

== Politics ==
Hamblen Presidential campaign button, 1952

Hamblen supported the American temperance movement and ran as the Prohibition Party's candidate for U.S. president in the 1952 presidential election, being nominated at the 1951 Prohibition National Convention. Hamblen garnered 72,949 recorded popular votes and no electoral votes in an election in which Republican Dwight D. Eisenhower was elected president for the first of two terms, defeating Democrat Adlai Stevenson.

Previously, Hamblen ran for California's 11th congressional district seat as a Democrat, losing to Carl Hinshaw in the 1938 election cycle. The race ended with Hinshaw at 47 percent and Hamblen with 41 percent of the vote.

== Discography ==
=== Albums ===
- It's No Secret (RCA Victor, 1956)
- The Grand Old Hymns (RCA Victor, 1957)
- Hymns (Harmony, 1957)
- A Visit With Stuart Hamblen (Sacred, 1958)
- Immortal Treasures (Sacred, 1958)
- Remember Me (Coral, 1958)
- Beyond the Sun (RCA Camden, 1959)
- The Spell of the Yukon (Columbia, 1961)
- Of God I Sing (Columbia, 1962)
- This Old House Has Got to Go (Kapp, 1966)
- I Believe (Harmony, 1967)
- The Cowboy Church (Word, 1973)
- A Man and His Music (Lamb & Lion, 1974)
- The Worlds of Stuart Hamblen Volume 1: The Shooting of Dan McGrew (Voss Records, 1978)
- The Worlds of Stuart Hamblen Volume 2: The Legacy of Stuart Hamblen (Voss, 1978)
- The Worlds of Stuart Hamblen Volume 3: So Dear to My Heart (Voss, 1978)
- The Worlds of Stuart Hamblen Volume 4: Songs the Cowboy Sings (Voss, 1978)

=== Singles ===
Year	Single		Label	Chart Positions	
Year	A-side	B-side	Label	US Country	US
1929	"When the Moon Shines Down Upon the Mountain"	"The Boy in Blue"	RCA Victor		
1930	"I Gotta Feelin'"	"Wrong Keyhole"	RCA Victor		
1930	"Standin' on the Pier in the Rain"	"Hawaii"	RCA Victor		
1930	"Sailor's Farewell"	"By the Sleepy Rio Grande"	RCA Victor		
1930	"The Big Rock Candy Mountains–No. 2"	"Drifting Back to Dixie"	RCA Victor		
1932	"My Brown-Eyed Texas Rose"	"My Mary"	RCA Victor		
1934	"Poor Unlucky Cowboy" (as Stuart Hamblen and His Covered Wagon Jubilee)	"Texas Plains" (as Stuart Hamblen and His Covered Wagon Jubilee)	Decca		
1935	"Lola Lee" (as Stuart Hamblen and His Covered Wagon Jubilee)	"Sunshine Alley" (as Stuart Hamblen and His Covered Wagon Jubilee)	Decca		
1935	"Be Just Like Your Daddy" (as Stuart Hamblen and His Covered Wagon Jubilee)	"Poor Boy" (as Stuart Hamblen and His Covered Wagon Jubilee)	Decca		
1935	"Riding Old Paint" (as Stuart Hamblen and His Covered Wagon Jubilee)	"Lopez the Bandit" (as Stuart Hamblen and His Covered Wagon Jubilee)	Decca		
1940	"Golden River" (with Ted Dahl Orchestra)	"Dream Book of Memories" (with Ted Dahl Orchestra)	Bluebird		
1945	"Whistling My Love Song to You"	"They're Gonna Kill Ya"	Ara		
1947	"Ace in the Hole" (as Stuart Hamblen and His Lucky Stars)	"My Old Hound Dog" (as Stuart Hamblen and His Lucky Stars)	4 Star		
1947	"Our Anniversary" (as Stuart Hamblen and His Lucky Stars)	"Blue Bonnets for Her Golden Hair" (as Stuart Hamblen and His Lucky Stars)	4 Star		
1949	"(I Won't Go Huntin', Jake) But I'll Go Chasin' Women"	"Let's See You Fix It"	Columbia	3	
1949	"Blue Bonnets in Her Golden Hair"	"Pony Express"	Columbia		
1950	"Sheepskin Corn and a Wrinkle on a Horn"	"Condemnation"	Columbia		
1950	"(Remember Me) I'm the One Who Loves You"	"I'll Find You"	Columbia	2	
1950	"It's No Secret"	"Blood on Your Hands"	Columbia	8	
1950	"Good Mornin' Yall"	"I Whisper Your Name"	Columbia		
1950	"Three Little Dwarfs"	"You Can't Kiss Santa Goodnight"	Columbia		
1951	"My Life With You"	"Old Glory"	Columbia		
1951	"King of All Kings"	"He Bought My Soul at Calvary"	Columbia		
1951	"Our Old Captain (Ain't a Man)" (with Darol Rice and His Orchestra)	"Don't Fool Around With Calico, When You Have Silk at Home" (with Darol Rice and His Orchestra)	Columbia		
1951	"These Things Shall Pass"	"I Believe"	Columbia		
1951	"Just Let Me Love You"	"You're Always Brand New"	Columbia		
1952	"This Ship of Mine"	"Black Diamond"	Columbia		
1952	"Lord, I Pray"	"Got So Many Million Years (I Can't Count Them)"	Columbia		
1952	"Known Only to Him" (with Darol Rice's Orchestra)	"Is He Satisfied" (with Darol Rice's Orchestra)	Columbia		
1952	"Our Love Affair (Will Always Smolder)"	"I Get Lonesome"	Columbia		
1952	"Grasshopper Mac Clain" (with Darol Rice's Orchestra)	"Oklahoma Bill" (with Darol Rice's Orchestra)	Columbia		
1953	"My Mary" (with Darol Rice and His Orchestra)	"A Million Wild Horses"	Columbia		
1953	"Old Pappy's New Banjo" (with the Cowboy Church Prairie Choir)	"Friends I Know" (with the Cowboy Church Prairie Choir)	Columbia		
1953	"Daddy's Cutie Pie" (with Darol Rice and His Orchestra)	"The Hidden You" (with Darol Rice and His Orchestra)	Columbia		
1953	"Teach Me Lord to Wait"	"I Believe"	Columbia		
1953	"Partners With God"	"You Must Be Born Again"	Columbia		
1953	"He Made a Way"	"My Religion's Not Old Fashioned"	Columbia		
1954	"The Workshop of the Lord"	"Rose of Cavalry"	Columbia		
1954	"This Ole House"	"When My Lord Picks Up the 'Phone"	RCA Victor	2	26
1954	"Please Tell Me Why"	"Beyond the Sun"	Columbia		
1954	"Heavenly Cannonball"	"I Am Persuaded"	RCA Victor		
1954	"Ole Pappy Time (Is a-Pickin' My Pockets)"	"The Toy Violin"	RCA Victor		
1954	"My Brother"	"If We All Said a Prayer"	RCA Victor		
1954	"Open Up Your Heart (And Let the Sunshine In)" (as the Cowboy Church Sunday School)	"The Lord Is Counting on You" (as the Cowboy Church Sunday School)	Decca		8
1955	"Just a Man"	"Go On By"	RCA Victor		
1955	"Lord I'll Try"	"Lonesome Valley"	RCA Victor		
1955	"The Little Black Sheep" (as the Cowboy Church Sunday School)	"Go on By" (as the Cowboy Church Sunday School)	Decca		
1955	"Lord I Can't Come Now" (with Martha Carson)	"Got So Many Million Years (I Can't Count Them)" (with Martha Carson)	RCA Victor		
1955	"A Handful of Sunshine"	"You'll Always Be Mine"	RCA Victor		
1956	"Those Bad Bad Kids" (as the Cowboy Church Sunday School featuring Little Miss Tomboy Janie)	"A Handful of Sunshine" (as the Cowboy Church Sunday School featuring Little Miss Enry)	Decca		
1956	"Hell Train"	"A Few Things to Remember"	RCA Victor		
1956	"Don't Send Those Kids to Sunday School (Get Out of Bed and Take Them)" (as Cowboy Church Sunday School)	"It Is No Secret" (as Cowboy Church Sunday School)	Decca		
1956	"The Rock"	"This Book"	RCA Victor		
1956	"Desert Sunrise" (as Stuart Hamblen's Orchestra)	"The Whistlers Dream" (as Stuart Hamblen's Orchestra)	RCA Victor		
1956	"God Is a Good God"	"The Sweetest Story Ever Told"	RCA Victor		
1956	"Beyond the Sun" (as Stuart Hamblen and His Family)	"Dear Lord, Be My Shepherd" (as Stuart Hamblen and His Family)	RCA Victor		
1957	"My Father" (with Darol Rice's Orchestra)	"The Lonesome Cowboy's Prayer" (with Darol Rice's Orchestra)	RCA Victor		
1957	"Oh Miss Chicken"	"The Baby Racoon in the Hollow Log"	RCA Victor		
1957	"The Old Rugged Cross"	"Old Time Religion"	RCA Victor		
1957	"This Ole World"	"Don't Fool Around With Calico"	RCA Victor		
1958	"You Can't Love Without Giving"	"Someone"	Coral		
1959	"(Remember Me) I'm the One Who Loves You"	"Indiana (Back Home Again in Indiana)"	Coral		
1960	"Golden River"	"The Foreman"	Columbia		
1961	"The Good Old Days"	"What Can I Do for My Country"	Columbia		
1962	"My Home (It's Always Where You Are)"	"Across the Great Divide"	Columbia		
1966	"Tho' Autumn's Coming On"	"This Old House Has Got to Go"	Kapp		
1971	"When Earth's Last Picture Is Painted"	"What Can I Do for My Country"	RCA Victor		
1973	"It's a Brand New Day"	"The Last Cowboy"	Voss		
1974	"Rack Up the Balls"	"Little Old Rag Doll"	Lamb & Lion		

== Filmography ==
Year	Title	Role	Notes
1937	Springtime in the Rockies	Truck Driver #1	Uncredited
1939	In Old Monterey	Bugler	
1939	The Arizona Kid	Val McBride	
1942	The Sombrero Kid	Smoke Denton	
1943	Carson City Cyclone	Frank Garrett	
1943	King of the Cowboys	Duke Wilson	Uncredited
1945	Flame of Barbary Coast	Jud McCone	Uncredited
1946	King of the Forest Rangers	Carver	Serial
1946	Plainsman and the Lady	Matt	
1950	The Savage Horde	Stuart	
1978	Mountain Lady	Narrator	(final film role)

== See also ==
- Prohibition Party presidential election results
