= Cuddle Buggin' Baby =

Song by Eddy Arnold
- Released: 1950
- Genre: Country
- Length: 2:20
- Label: RCA Victor
- Songwriter(s): Red Rowe

"Cuddle Buggin' Baby" is a country music song written by Red Rowe, sung by Eddy Arnold, and released on the RCA Victor label. In July 1950, it reached No. 2 on the country best-seller chart. It spent 17 weeks on the charts and was the No. 7 best selling country record of 1950.

== See also ==
- Billboard Top Country & Western Records of 1950
