= M-I-S-S-I-S-S-I-P-P-I =

M-I-S-S-I-S-S-I-P-P-I is a song written by Bert Hanlon and Ben Ryan, with music by Harry Tierney. The conductor of the song was Josef Pasternack. It was written by Ben Ryan for Frances White, who introduced it in the Florenz Ziegfeld revue Midnight Frolics in 1916. It was used again two years later in a revue, Hitchy-Koo.
