= Why Don't You Love Me (Hank Williams song) =

Single by Hank Williams with His Drifting Cowboys
- B-side: "A House Without Love"
- Published: April 7, 1950 Acuff-Rose Publications
- Released: May 1950
- Recorded: January 9, 1950
- Studio: Castle Studio, Nashville
- Genre: Country & Western, Honky-tonk, Country blues
- Length: 2:23
- Label: MGM 10696
- Songwriter: Hank Williams
- Producer: Fred Rose

Hank Williams with His Drifting Cowboys singles chronology
"Long Gone Lonesome Blues" (1950)	"Why Don't You Love Me" (1950)	"Why Should We Try Anymore" (1950)

"Why Don't You Love Me" is a song by American singer and guitarist Hank Williams. The song reached number one on the U.S. Country & Western chart. It was released as a single in 1950 with the B-side, "A House Without Love".

== Background ==
Like his previous hits "You're Gonna Change (Or I'm Gonna Leave)" and "I Just Don't Like This Kind of Living", "Why Don't You Love Me" was likely inspired by Hank's turbulent relationship with his wife Audrey Williams. However, the song is more lighthearted in nature, with the narrator admonishing himself ("I'm the same old trouble you've always been through") and became Williams' third No. 1 country hit. The tune was recorded in Nashville at Castle Studio with Fred Rose producing on January 9, 1950, and featured Jerry Rivers (fiddle), Don Helms (steel guitar), Bob McNett (lead guitar), Jack Shook (rhythm guitar), and Ernie Newton (bass). It is set in common time composed in a moderate tempo, with a main key of F major with a basic sequence of F–C7–B♭ as its chord progression.

"Why Don't You Love Me" was featured over the closing credits of the film The Last Picture Show.

== Charts ==
Chart (1950)	Peak position
U.S. Billboard Hot Country Singles	1

== Cover versions ==
- Connie Smith covered "Why Don't You Love Me" for her 1975 album, I Got a Lot of Hurtin' Done Today / I've Got My Baby on My Mind, and released as a single, peaking at No. 15 on the Billboard Country chart.
- The Red Hot Chili Peppers covered the song for their 1984 self-titled debut album.

== Sources ==
- Escott, Colin; Merritt, George; MacEwen, William (2004). Hank Williams: The Biography. New York: Little, Brown.
