= Birmingham Bounce =

"Birmingham Bounce" is a 1950s song written by Hardrock Gunter. Hardrock Gunter's original version recorded in 1950 was nominated in Jim Dawson and Steve Probe's book, What Was The First Rock and Roll Record?, as potentially the first rock and roll recording.

== Red Foley recording ==
The most famous version was recorded by Red Foley who made it a hit. The song was Foley's sixth number one on the Folk Record chart and spent a total of fifteen weeks on the chart. The B-side of Foley's "Birmingham Bounce", entitled, "Choc'late Ice Cream Cone" went to number five on the folk music chart.

== Other cover versions ==
Others that have recorded "Birmingham Bounce" include:

- Tommy Dorsey
- Amos Milburn
- Lionel Hampton,
- Sid Phillips
- Ted Heath
- Tex Williams
