= Chattanoogie Shoe Shine Boy =

1950 song by Harry Stone and Jack Stapp

Single by Red Foley
- B-side: "Sugar-Foot Rag"
- Published: January 11, 1950 by Acuff-Rose Publications, Inc., Nashville
- Released: December 1949
- Recorded: November 7, 1949
- Studio: Castle Studio, Nashville
- Genre: Country & Western
- Label: Decca 46205
- Songwriter(s): Harry Stone, Jack Stapp
- Producer(s): Owen Bradley

Red Foley singles chronology
"Tennessee Polka" (1949)	"Chattanoogie Shoe Shine Boy" (1949)	"Birmingham Bounce" (1950)

"Chattanoogie Shoe Shine Boy" (also known as "Chattanooga Shoe Shine Boy") is a popular song written by Harry Stone and Jack Stapp and published in 1950. It is the signature song of Red Foley who recorded it in late 1949. The song has been covered by many artists, including Bing Crosby, Frank Sinatra, and Faron Young who scored a hit with the song in 1959.

Many versions of the song charted in 1950, but the most successful was by Red Foley, whose recording, produced by Owen Bradley at the Castle Studio in Nashville, was released by Decca Records as catalog number 46205. The record first reached the Billboard charts on January 13, 1950, and lasted 15 weeks on the chart, peaking at number one. Foley's recording also went to number one on the country chart and stayed at the top spot for three months. It featured guitarist Grady Martin.

Other charting versions were recorded by Bing Crosby, Frank Sinatra, Phil Harris, Bradford & Romano and Bill Darnel. The Crosby recording was made on January 3, 1950 and was released by Decca Records as catalog number 24863. The record first reached the Billboard charts on February 4, 1950, and lasted 13 weeks on the chart, peaking at number four.

The Sinatra recording was released by Columbia Records as catalog number 38708. The record first reached the Billboard charts on March 10, 1950, and lasted one week on the chart, at number 24.

The Harris recording was released by RCA Victor Records as a 78 rpm single (catalog number 20-3692) and a 45 rpm single (catalog number 47-3216). The record first reached the Billboard charts on March 17, 1950, and lasted two weeks on the chart, peaking at No. 26.

The Darnel recording was released by Coral Records as catalog number 60147. The record first reached the Billboard charts on March 3, 1950, and lasted one week on the chart, at No. 26.

== Other versions ==
- Pat Boone on the album Howdy! 1957.
- Freddy Cannon recorded it for his debut 1960 album The Explosive Freddy Cannon. As a single from the album, it charted at #34 on the Billboard Hot 100 on March 19, 1960.

== See also ==
- Chattanooga Choo Choo
