= Long Gone Lonesome Blues =

1950 song by Hank Williams

Single by Hank Williams with His Drifting Cowboys
- B-side: "My Son Calls Another Man Daddy"
- Published: March 1, 1950 Acuff-Rose Publications
- Released: March 1950
- Recorded: January 9, 1950
- Studio: Castle Studio, Nashville
- Genre: Country, honky-tonk, country blues
- Length: 2:40
- Label: MGM
- Songwriter: Hank Williams
- Producer: Fred Rose

Hank Williams with His Drifting Cowboys singles chronology
"I Just Don't Like This Kind of Living" (1950)	"Long Gone Lonesome Blues" (1950)	"Why Don't You Love Me" (1950)

"Long Gone Lonesome Blues" is a 1950 song by Hank Williams. It was Williams' second number-one single on the Country & Western chart. "Long Gone Lonesome Blues" stayed on the charts for 21 weeks, with five weeks at the top.

== Background ==
"Long Gone Lonesome Blues" is quite similar in form and style to Williams' previous number-one hit "Lovesick Blues". Biographer Colin Escott speculates that Hank deliberately utilized the similar title, tempo, and yodels because, although he had scored five top-5 hits since "Lovesick Blues" had topped the charts, he had not had another number one. Williams had been carrying the title around in his head for a while but it was not until he went on a fishing trip with songwriter Vic McAlpin that the inspiration to write the song took hold:

"They left early to drive out to the Tennessee River where it broadens into Kentucky Lake, but Hank had been unable to sleep on the trip, and was noodling around with the title all the way. As McAlpin told journalist Roger Williams, he and Hank were already out on the lake when McAlpin became frustrated with Hank's preoccupation. 'You come here to fish or watch the fish swim by?' he said, and suddenly Hank had the key that unlocked the song for him. 'Hey!' he said. 'That's the first line!'

Williams bought out McAlpin's meager share in the song and took sole credit. The tune was recorded in Nashville at Castle Studio with Fred Rose producing on January 9, 1950, and featured Jerry Rivers (fiddle), Don Helms (steel guitar), Bob McNett (lead guitar), Jack Shook (rhythm guitar), and Ernie Newton (bass). The song's bluesy guitar intro, high falsettos, and Hank's suicidal yet irresistibly catchy lyrics, sent it soaring to the top of the country charts on March 25, 1950.

The song became one of Williams's best known songs. Three decades later, another American troubadour, Bruce Springsteen, would gain the inspiration to write one of his best known songs, "The River," from the opening lines of "Long Gone Lonesome Blues."

== Charts ==
Chart (1950)	Peak position
US Hot Country Songs (Billboard)	1

== Cover versions ==
- Mack Vickery recorded a rockabilly version of the song under the name Hollis Champion.
- In 1964, Hank Williams Jr. made his debut on the country chart with his own version of the song, which peaked at number five on the country chart and number 67 on the Hot 100.
- Dennis Robbins covered the song in 1986 as a live single for MCA Records. His version went to number 63 on the country chart.
- Sheryl Crow covered the song for the soundtrack of the 2002 film Sweet Home Alabama.

== Sources ==
- Escott, Colin; Merritt, George; MacEwen, William (2004). Hank Williams: The Biography. New York: Little, Brown.
