= Moon Mullican =

American singer-songwriter and pianist (1909–1967)

Background information
- Born: Aubrey Wilson Mullican; March 29, 1909; Polk County, Texas, United States
- Died: January 1, 1967 (aged 57) Beaumont, Texas
- Genres: Country and western; western swing; boogie-woogie; blues
- Occupations: Singer, pianist, songwriter
- Years active: 1926–1966
- Labels: King; Coral

Aubrey Wilson Mullican (March 29, 1909 – January 1, 1967), known professionally as Moon Mullican and nicknamed "King of the Hillbilly Piano Players", was an American country and western singer, songwriter, and pianist. He was associated with the hillbilly boogie style which influenced rockabilly. Jerry Lee Lewis cited him as a major influence on his own singing and piano playing.

== Early life ==
Mullican was born to Oscar Luther Mullican (1876–1961) and his first wife, Virginia Jordan Mullican (1880–1915), near Corrigan, Polk County, Texas, United States. They were a farming family of Scottish, Irish and Eastern European ancestry. His Scots-Irish immigrant ancestor, James Mullikin, was born in Scotland, arriving in Maryland, United States in the 1630s from Northern Ireland. His paternal grandfather was Pvt. Wilson G. Mullican, who served in the 6th Mississippi Infantry Regiment, Confederate States Army, at the Battle of Shiloh. Mullican's parents, stepmother, and grandparents are all buried in Stryker Cemetery, Polk County, Texas.

== Beginnings in music ==
As a child Mullican began playing the organ, which his religious father had purchased in order to better sing hymns at church. However, Moon made friends with Joe Jones, a black sharecropper on the family farm, who introduced him to the country blues. Moon's parents did not always approve, and he was torn between playing religious and secular music. After making his mark as a local piano player, Mullican left home at age 16, going to Houston, where he performed and sang in local clubs.

By the 1930s, Mullican had acquired his nickname "Moon". Although published sources suggest it is short for "moonshine" or possibly from his all-night performances; his family says it was because he loved to play "Shoot the Moon", a variation of the dominoes game "42". It is also highly likely the widely popular syndicated comic strip Moon Mullins, which debuted in 1923, played a role in the similar nickname and alliteration sticking to Mullican.

== Early career ==
His earliest influences were popular blues artists of the day such as Bessie Smith, Blind Lemon Jefferson and Leroy Carr, together with country musicians including Jimmie Rodgers, and Bob Wills. In 1936, he covered Cab Calloway's "Georgia Pine" and also sang his own compositions "Ain't You Kinda Sorry" and "Swing Baby Swing" for Leon Selph's Western swing band, The Blue Ridge Playboys. He played and recorded with Cliff Bruner's Texas Wanderers, the Sunshine Boys, and Jimmie Davis. By the end of the 1930s, he had become a popular vocalist with a warm, deep, vocal delivery. Mullican frequently met up with another pianist, Black Boy Shine, when performing around Houston. Combining nicknames, for a short time in the 1930s, they performed as a duo called "Moonshine".

In the early 1940s, he returned to the Texas Wanderers as lead singer and pianist, sang on the hits "Truck Driver's Blues" and "I'll Keep On Loving You". However, after leaving the band in 1942, he became a session musician playing on the songs of Floyd Tillman, Ernest Tubb, and Red Foley.

== The Showboys ==
In 1945, he put together his own band, The Showboys, who quickly became one of the most popular outfits in the Texas-Louisiana area with a mix of country music, Western swing, Cajun music, and Mullican's wild piano playing and singing. Although their style was highly eclectic and included country ballads, some of their music clearly foreshadowed what would later be called rock and roll. In September 1946, Mullican cut 16 recordings as band leader, for King Records in Cincinnati. His first release, "The Lonesome Hearted Blues" b/w "It's a Sin to Love You Like I Do" sold quite well, but did not chart. His second release, "New Jole Blon" in December 1946 (later recorded by Doug Kershaw), reached number 2 on the Country and Western chart, sold one million copies and was the beginning of a long string of hits. He became a member of the Grand Ole Opry in 1951.

Mullican was one of the highest-selling artists on King Records. Though not a major chart success, he was popular in the southeastern United States with records such as "The Leaves Mustn't Fall", "Hey Shah", "You Don't Have to Be a Baby to Cry", "Nine Tenths of the Tennessee River", and "I Was Sorta Wonderin'".

In the mid-1950s, many artists, such as Lefty Frizzell and George Jones experimented with rock and roll as its popularity began to gain ground on traditional country-and-western in the mid-1950s. Seeking some of that success, Mullican recorded four rock sides with Boyd Bennett and His Rockets, including "Seven Nights to Rock". However, both singles failed to chart. Before he signed to Coral in 1958, he had three other hits with King, including "Hey Shah".

== Later career ==
In 1958, Mullican was signed by country music producer Owen Bradley to Decca Records' subsidiary label Coral Records, and recorded more rock songs including "Moon's Rock" and "Sweet Rockin' Music". Devastated by the failure of his rock sides, Owen Bradley convinced Mullican to record his original songs in the burgeoning new more lush style of country music, the Nashville sound. However, Bradley was frustrated with Mullican; he reportedly said himself, "There was nothing I could do with him." Mullican, whose style was largely in traditional honky tonk, found it difficult to make such a large adjustment to his style and was dropped from Coral in 1959.

In the early 1960s, Mullican was a largely forgotten figure nationally, but based himself in Texas and carried on performing, recording then for the Starday and Spar labels. The decade saw him record country songs such as "I'll Pour the Wine" and "Love Don't Have a Guarantee", together with less notable novelties including "I Ain't No Beatle, But I Wanna Hold Your Hand". One of his last records was "Love That Might Have Been".

== Death ==
In spite of having a heart condition Mullican continued to perform regularly. On New Year's Eve 1966 he suffered a heart attack in Beaumont, Texas, and died early in the morning on January 1, 1967, aged 57. He is buried in Magnolia Cemetery, Beaumont, Texas, the epitaph on his tombstone reading "I'll Sail My Ship Alone", the name of one of his many hits.

His wife Eunice (d. 1973) survived him; the couple was childless.

== Influence ==
During the late 1940s and early 1950s, Mullican influenced many other country artists. He had defined a style of country balladeering not hinted at in his 1930s work. This style of music influenced Jim Reeves (a band member for a while), Hank Williams (who named Mullican as a favorite artist), Hank Snow, Bill Haley, Elvis Presley, and especially Jerry Lee Lewis, who covered many of Mullican's songs. It was in the realm of hillbilly boogie, however, that Mullican had his greatest influence. Many of his songs, such as "Pipeliners Blues", "Hey! Mister Cotton-Picker" and "Cherokee Boogie" (his biggest hit, in 1951) foreshadowed a style adopted with widespread popularity by Haley and later rock and rollers. Mullican also influenced many others, including the Western swing band Asleep at the Wheel, which recorded his song "Cherokee Boogie" on their 1973 album Comin' Right At Ya, with several recording tribute CDs to mark Mullican's 100th birthday in 2009

Mullican is also believed to have co-written "Jambalaya," a song made famous by Hank Williams that could not be credited to Mullican because of his contract with King Records. Mullican's recording of the song was released in July 1952, the same month as Williams' version, but differs significantly in having a different order of verses and extra rhyming couplets.

== Legacy ==
In 1976, Mullican was posthumously inducted into the Nashville Songwriters Hall of Fame. There have been many posthumous compilations of his music, on various labels including Ace and Bear Family.

== Discography ==
Year	Single	Chart positions	
Year	Single	US Country	US
1947	"New Pretty Blonde (Jole Blon)"	2	21
1947	"Jole Blon's Sister"	4	
1948	"Sweeter Than the Flowers"	3	30
1948	"I Left My Heart in Texas"	12	
1948	"Foggy River"	13	
1949	"What Have I Done That Made You Go Away?"	15	
1950	"I'll Sail My Ship Alone"	1	17
1950	"You Don't Have to Be a Baby to Cry "	8	
1950	"Goodnight Irene"	5	
1950	"Mona Lisa"	4	
1951	"I Was Sorta Wonderin'"	10	
1951	"Cherokee Boogie (Eh-Oh-Aleena)"	7	
1952	"Jambalaya"		
1953	"Pipeliner Blues"		
1956	"Hey Shah"		
1961	"Ragged but Right"	15	

=== CD compilations ===
- Moon's Rock (Bear Family, 1992)
- Moonshine Jamboree (Ace, 1993)
- The EP Collection (See For Miles, 2000)
- Showboy Special: The Early King Sides (1946-1947) (Westside, 2000)
- Moon's Tunes: The Chronological King Recordings, Vol. 2 (1947–1950) (Westside, 2002)
- I'll Sail My Ship Alone (Proper, 2002) 2CD
- Seven Nights To Rock (More King Classics 1950–1956) (Ace, 2004)
- I Done It! The Uptempo Moon Mullican 1949–1958 (Jasmine, 2019)
