= Lefty Frizzell discography =

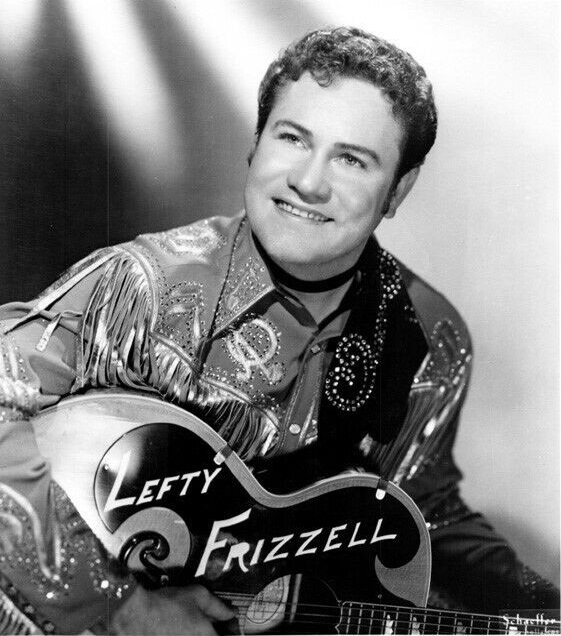
- Studio albums: 13
- EPs: 1
- Compilation albums: 10
- Singles: 66
- No.1 single: 6

Lefty Frizzell was an American country music singer-songwriter, who gained massive popularity in 1950, following an explosive debut two-sided single ("If You've Got the Money (I've Got the Time)," "I Love You A Thousand Ways"). He released a string of successful hits from 1950 to 1955. He released a country standard "Long Black Veil" in 1959, and released three mostly unnoticed LP's. After The Long Black Veil in 1959, Frizzell did not chart another single until 1963. The next year, he released his last of six US Country chart toppers: "Saginaw, Michigan."

After that, he released his first charting album with the same title, and it peaked at No. 2 in the same year. In 1965, Frizzell charted his last Top 20 hit, titled, "She's Gone, Gone, Gone". After developing a drinking habit, he released songs that did not chart very well, and in 1972, he left his longtime label Columbia Records, and signed to ABC Records. In 1975, he was inducted into the Nashville Songwriters Hall of Fame and was given the Grammy Hall of Fame Award. This success led to more money, then more drinking. On July 19, 1975, Frizzell suffered a massive stroke and later died at the age of 47.

After a 25-year career, Lefty Frizzell had charted a little over 30 singles, and released 13 studio albums. Today, he is regarded as one of the most influential voices in country music history, inspiring many of the next generation's artists. The following is collection of work gathered from 1950 to 2006:

== Studio albums ==
Title	Album details
Songs of Jimmie Rodgers	Release date: October 8, 1951; Label: Columbia
Listen to Lefty	Release date: June 1952; Label: Columbia
Lefty Frizzell (EP)	Release date: January 1957; Label: Columbia
The One and Only	Release date: August 1959; Label: Columbia
Sings the Songs of Jimmie Rodgers	Release date: 1960; Label: Columbia Records
Saginaw, Michigan	Release date: April 1964; Label: Columbia
Sad Side of Love	Release date: October 1965; Label: Columbia
Great Sound	Release date: August 1966; Label: Columbia
Puttin' On	Release date: March 1967; Label: Columbia
Mom and Dad Waltz	Release date: May 1967; Label: Columbia
Signed, Sealed and Delivered	Release date: 1968; Label: Columbia
Mark of Time	Release date: January 1973; Label: Columbia
The Legendary	Release date: September 18, 1973; Label: ABC
Classic Style	Release dates: April 4, 1975; Label: ABC

== Compilations ==
Title	Album details	Peak chart positions	
Title	Album details	US Country	US
Country Favorites	Release date: early 1966; Label: Columbia	—	—
Greatest Hits	Release date: late 1966; Label: Columbia	—	—
Remembering... The Greatest Of	Release date: mid 1975; Label: ABC	43	—
ABC Collection	Release date: early 1977; Label: ABC	—	—
Treasure's Untold	Release date: 1980; Label: Rounder	—	—
The Best of	Release date: 1991; Label: Rhino Records/Sony Music	—	—
Life's Like Poetry	Release date: 1992; Label: Bear Family Records	—	—
Look What Thoughts Will Do	Release date: January 28, 1997; Label: Columbia/Legacy	—	—
If You've Got the Money	Release date: May 24, 2005; Label: Living Era/ASV	—	—
16 Biggest Hits	Release date: February 21, 2006; Label: Legacy/Sony Music Distribution	—	—

== Singles ==
=== 1950s ===
Year	Single	Peak chart positions		Album
Year	Single	US Country	US	Album
1950	"If You've Got the Money (I've Got the Time)"	1	—	Listen to Lefty
1950	"I Love You a Thousand Ways"	1	—	Listen to Lefty
1951	"Look What Thoughts Will Do"	4	—	Listen to Lefty
1951	"Shine, Shave, Shower (It's Saturday)"	7	—	non-album single
1951	"My Baby's Just Like Money"	—	—	Country Favorites
1951	"I Want to Be with You Always"	1	29	Listen to Lefty
1951	"Always Late (With Your Kisses)	1	—	Listen to Lefty
1951	"Mom and Dad's Waltz"	2	—	Listen to Lefty
1951	"Blue Yodel No.2 (My Lovin' Gal Lucille)"	—	—	Songs of Jimmie Rodgers
1951	"Brakeman's Blues"	—	—	Songs of Jimmie Rodgers
1951	"Travelin' Blues"	6	—	Songs of Jimmie Rodgers
1951	"My Rough and Rowdy Ways"	—	—	Songs of Jimmie Rodgers
1952	"Give Me More, More, More (Of Your Kisses)"	1	—	Country Favorites
1952	"How Long Will It Take (To Stop Loving You)"	7	—	Treasures Untold
1952	"Don't Stay Away (Till' Love Grows Cold)"	2	—	Listen to Lefty
1952	"It's Just You (I Could Love Always)"	—	—	Treasures Untold
1952	Forever (And Always)	6	—	non-album single
1952	"You're Just Mine (Only In My Dreams)"	—	—	Country Favorites
1953	"I'm an Old, Old Man (Tryin' to Live While I Can)"	3	—	non-album singles
1953	"Hurry! (Bring Your Sweet Self Back to Me)"	8	—	non-album singles
1953	"Never No Mo' Blues"	—	—	Songs of Jimmie Rodgers
1953	"California Blues"	—	—	Songs of Jimmie Rodgers
1953	"We Crucified Our Jesus"	—	—	non-album singles
1953	"Before You Go (Be Sure You Know)"	—	—	non-album singles
1953	"Hopeless Love"	—	—	non-album singles
1953	"Two Hearts Broken Now"	—	—	Country Favorites
1954	"Run Em' Off"	8	—	Country Favorites
1954	"My Little Her and Him"	—	—	Mom and Dad's Waltz
1954	"King Without a Queen"	—	—	Country Favorites
1954	"You're Too Late"	—	—	non-album single
1955	"I Love You Mostly"	11	—	Country Favorites
1955	"Making Believe"	—	—	non-album singles
1955	"I'll Sit Alone and Cry"	—	—	non-album singles
1955	"Sweet Lies"	—	—	Country Favorites
1955	"Your Tomorrow's Will Never Come"	—	—	non-album singles
1956	"First to Have a Second Chance"	—	—	non-album singles
1956	"Promises"	—	—	non-album singles
1956	"Just Can't Live That Fast (Any More)"	—	—	non-album singles
1956	"Heart's Highway"	—	—	non-album singles
1956	"From an Angel to a Devil"	—	—	Country Favorites
1956	"Lullaby Waltz"	—	—	Mom and Dad's Waltz
1957	"Now That You Are Gone"	—	—	Treasures Untold
1957	"No One to Talk To (But the Blues)"	—	—	Mom and Dad's Waltz
1957	"Time Out for the Blues"	—	—	Mom and Dad's Waltz
1958	"Silence"	—	—	non-album single
1958	"Cigarettes and Coffee Blues"	13	—	Mom and Dad's Waltz
1959	"The Long Black Veil"	6	—	Greatest Hits
1959	"Farther Than My Eyes Can See"	—	—	non-album single

=== 1960s ===
Year	Single	Peak chart positions			Album
Year	Single	US Country	US	CAN Country	Album
1960	"She's Gone"	—	—	—	non-album singles
1960	"What You Gonna Do Leroy"	—	—	—	non-album singles
1961	"Heaven's Plan"	—	—	—	non-album singles
1961	"I Feel Sorry for Me"	—	—	—	non-album singles
1962	"Stranger"	—	—	—	Saginaw, Michigan
1963	"Forbidden Lovers"	23	—	—	Remembering... The Greatest of Hits
1963	"Don't Let Her See Me Cry"	30	—	—	Saginaw, Michigan
1964	"Saginaw, Michigan"	1	85	—	Saginaw, Michigan
1964	"The Nester"	28	—	—	non-album singles
1964	"Make that One for the Road a Cup of Coffee"	—	—	—	non-album singles
1965	"She's Gone, Gone, Gone"	12	—	—	The Sad Side of Love
1965	"A Little Unfair"	36	—	—	The Sad Side of Love
1965	"Love Looks Good on You"	41	—	—	The Sad Side of Love
1966	"Mama"	—	—	—	non-album single
1966	"I Just Couldn't See the Forest (For the Trees)"	51	—	—	Puttin' On
1967	"You Gotta Be Puttin' Me On"	—	—	—	Puttin' On
1967	"Get This Stranger Outta Me"	—	—	—	Puttin' On
1967	"Anything You Can Spare"	—	—	—	Puttin' On
1968	"Have I Ever Been Untrue"	—	—	—	non-album singles
1968	"The Marriage Bit"	59	—	35	non-album singles
1968	"Wasted Way of Life"	—	—	—	non-album singles
1969	"An Article from Life"	64	—	—	non-album singles
1969	"Honky Tonk Hill"	—	—	—	non-album singles

=== 1970s ===
Year	Single	Chart Positions			Album
Year	Single	US Country	US	CAN Country	Album
1970	"Watermelon Time in Georgia"	49			non-album singles
1972	"You, Babe"	59			non-album singles
1973	"Let Me Give Her the Flowers"				Mark of Time
1973	"I Can't Get Over You to Save My Life"	43			The Legendary Lefty Frizzell
1974	"I Never Go Around Mirrors"	25			The Legendary Lefty Frizzell
1974	"Railroad Lady"	52			The Legendary Lefty Frizzell
1974	"Lucky Arms"	21			The Legendary Lefty Frizzell
1975	"Life's Like Poetry"	67			Classic Style
1975	"Falling"	50		49	Classic Style
