= To Lefty from Willie =

Studio album by Willie Nelson
- Released: June 1977
- Recorded: 1975
- Studios: January Sound, Dallas, Texas
- Genre: Country
- Length: 28:31
- Label: Columbia
- Producer: Willie Nelson

Willie Nelson chronology
The Troublemaker (1976)	To Lefty from Willie (1977)	There'll Be No Teardrops Tonight (1978)

Professional ratings
Review scores
Source	Rating
AllMusic	4.5/5 stars
Christgau's Record Guide	B+
The Rolling Stone Album Guide	4/5 stars

To Lefty from Willie is a studio album by American country music singer Willie Nelson. Recorded in 1975, the album sat in the vaults of Columbia Records until 1977. It is Willie Nelson's tribute to fellow country singer Lefty Frizzell.

== Track listing ==
No.	Title	Writer(s)	Length
1.	"Mom and Dad's Waltz"	Lefty Frizzell	3:02
2.	"Look What Thoughts Will Do"	Frizzell, Dub Dickerson, Jim Beck	2:42
3.	"I Love You a Thousand Ways"	Frizzell, Beck	2:59
4.	"Always Late (with Your Kisses)"	Frizzell, Blackie Crawford	2:25
5.	"I Want to Be with You Always"	Frizzell, Beck	2:39
6.	"She's Gone, Gone, Gone"	Harlan Howard	2:31
7.	"A Little Unfair"	Chuck Howard, Hank Cochran	3:42
8.	"I Never Go Around Mirrors"	Frizzell, Sanger D. Shafer	2:34
9.	"That's the Way Love Goes"	Frizzell, Shafer	3:11
10.	"Railroad Lady"	Jerry Jeff Walker, Jimmy Buffett	2:39

=== 2003 bonus track ===
11. "If You've Got the Money I've Got the Time" (Frizzell, Beck) – 1:39

== Personnel ==
- Willie Nelson – guitar, vocals
- Jody Payne – guitar
- Bee Spears – bass
- Bobbie Nelson – piano
- Rex Ludwig – drums
- Paul English – drums
- Mickey Raphael – harmonica
