= Billboard Top Country & Western Records of 1951 =

American music chart

These are lists of Billboard magazine's "Top Country & Western Records" for 1951, ranked by retail sales and juke box plays.

== Overview ==
Hank Williams' "Cold, Cold Heart" was 1951's No. 1 country hit based on retail sales and No. 6 based on juke box plays. Lefty Frizzell's "I Want to Be with You Always" ranked No. 1 based on juke box plays and No. 2 based on retail sales. The year's other top hits included: Frizzell's "Always Late with Your Kisses" (No. 2 retail, No. 2 juke box), Hank Snow's "The Rhumba Boogie" (No. 4 retail, No. 5 juke box), Eddy Arnold's "I Wanna Play House With You" (No. 2 juke box, No. 5 retail), and Tennessee Ernie Ford's "The Shotgun Boogie" (No. 4 juke box, No. 7 retail).

=== Leading artists and labels ===
The Billboard year-end charts were cited as proof that Lefty Frizzell was "the nation's number one western and country recording star." Frizzell led all other artists with seven records appearing on the Billboard year-end charts. Eddy Arnold placed second with six records followed by Hank Williams (five), Hank Snow (five), and Carl Smith (three).

The RCA Victor and Columbia labels dominated the 1951 year-end country charts, with 14 records from RCA Victor and 12 from Columbia. Decca, which had dominated the 1950 year-end country charts with 11 records, managed to land only one record on the 1951 year-end charts.

=== Other promulgators ===
While Billboard is considered the authoritative source, at least one other publisher, Music VF, created its own list of the top country hits of 1951. Music VF's list was led by (1) "Slow Poke" by Pee Wee King, (2) "Mockin' Bird Hill" by Les Paul and Mary Ford, (3) "On Top of Old Smoky" by The Weavers, (4) "Down Yonder" by Del Wood, and (5) "Mockin' Bird Hill" by the Pinetoppers.

=== Country music in 1951 ===
During the early 1950s, there was tremendous growth in the popularity of country music, as artists like Eddy Arnold sold records at a level that rivaled Bing Crosby, Frank Sinatra, and other top pop artists. Patti Page's "Tennessee Waltz", produced and recorded in Nashville, crossed over to become a No. 1 hit on pop charts in 1951, and "more than any other single song, established Nashville as a source of songs for the pop market. Hank Williams' "Cold, Cold Heart" was another prominent example of country music crossing over in 1951; the song was such a massive hit that five versions reached the pop Top 30, and Tony Bennett's version spent six weeks at No. 1. The creation of a separate Billboard chart to track the top country hits confirmed the increased importance of the genre.

== Top records ==
Retail year-end	Juke box year-end	Peak (Note: This column recites the record's peak position on Billboard's weekly charts.)	Title	Artist(s)	Label
1	6	1	"Cold, Cold Heart"	Hank Williams	M-G-M
2	1	1	"I Want to Be with You Always"	Lefty Frizzell	Columbia
3	3	1	"Always Late with Your Kisses"	Lefty Frizzell	Columbia
4	5	1	"The Rhumba Boogie"	Hank Snow	RCA Victor
5	2	1	"I Wanna Play House With You"	Eddy Arnold	RCA Victor
6	13	1	"There's Been a Change in Me"	Eddy Arnold	RCA Victor
7	4	1	"The Shotgun Boogie"	Tennessee Ernie Ford	Capitol
8	7	1	"Hey, Good Lookin'"	Hank Williams	M-G-M
9	11	2	"Mom and Dad's Waltz"	Lefty Frizzell	Columbia
10	17	1	"The Golden Rocket"	Hank Snow	RCA Victor
11	NR	1	"I'm Movin' On	Hank Snow	RCA Victor
12	8	1	"Kentucky Waltz"	Eddy Arnold	RCA Victor
13	10	1	"Slow Poke"	Pee Wee King	RCA Victor
14	9	2	"Let's Live a Little"	Carl Smith	Columbia
15	19	1	"I Love You a Thousand Ways"	Lefty Frizzell	Columbia
16	30	4	"Poison Love"	Johnnie and Jack	RCA Victor
17	12	2	"Down the Trail of Aching Hearts" | Hank Snow Anita Carter	RCA Victor	
18	25	4	"Bluebird Island"	Anita Carter Hank Snow	RCA Victor
19	29	5	"Peace in the Valley"	Red Foley	Decca
20	23	4	"Mr. Moon"	Carl Smith	Columbia
21	20	1	"If You've Got the Money I've Got the Time"	Lefty Frizzell	Columbia
22	NR	5	"Heart Strings"	Eddy Arnold	RCA Victor
23	26	2	"Somebody's Been Beating My Time"	Eddy Arnold	RCA Victor
24	NR	6	"Travelin' Blues"	Lefty Frizzell	Columbia
25	21		"Beautiful Brown Eyes"	Jimmy Wakely	Capitol
26	NR	4	"Look What Thoughts Will Do"	Lefty Frizzell	Columbia
27	15	3	"Howlin' at the Moon"	Hank Williams	M-G-M
28	NR	1	"Let Old Mother Nature Have Her Way"	Carl Smith	Columbia
29	28	4	"Crazy Heart"	Hank Williams	M-G-M
30	NR	8	"It's No Secret"	Stuart Hamblen	Columbia
NR	14	2	"I Can't Help It (If I'm Still in Love with You)"	Hank Williams	M-G-M
NR	16	3	"Mockin' Bird Hill"	Pinetoppers	Coral
NR	18	5	"Down Yonder"	Del Wood	Tennessee
NR	22	4	"Something Old, Something New"	Eddy Arnold	RCA Victor
NR	24	2	"Tennessee Waltz"	Patti Page	Mercury
NR	27	5	"Cryin' Heart Blues"	Johnnie and Jack	RCA Victor
NR	30	7	"Sick, Sober and Sorry	Johnny Bond	Columbia

== See also ==
- List of Billboard number-one country songs of 1951
- Billboard year-end top 30 singles of 1951
- 1951 in country music
