= The One and Only (Lefty Frizzell album) =

Studio album by Lefty Frizzell
- Released: early 1959
- Recorded: 1950–1958
- Genre: Country
- Length: 31:38
- Label: Columbia
- Producer: Don Law

Lefty Frizzell chronology
Listen to Lefty (1952)	The One and Only (1959)	Saginaw, Michigan (1964)

The One and Only is a studio album by Lefty Frizzell released in 1959. The album is the third and last studio album of Frizzell's to be released in the 1950s (when he had his most success). It includes many of his fan favorites and most successful songs of the 1950s, including "If You've Got the Money (I've Got the Time)", "Always Late (With Your Kisses)", "I Love You a Thousand Ways", and "Mom and Dad's Waltz".

== Track listing ==
Side One
No.	Title	Writer(s)	Length
1.	"If You've Got the Money (I've Got the Time)"	Lefty Frizzell, Jim Beck	2:58
2.	"Mom and Dad's Waltz"	Frizzell	3:06
3.	"Signed, Sealed, and Delivered"	Cowboy Copas, Lois Mann	2:32
4.	"Nobody Knows But Me"	Elsie McWilliams, Jimmie Rodgers	2:23
5.	"Release Me"	Eddie Miller, Dub Williams, Robert Yount	2:45
6.	"Why Should I Be Lonely"	Estelle Lovell, Rodgers	3:19

Side Two
No.	Title	Writer(s)	Length
1.	"Always Late (With Your Kisses)"	Blackie Crawford, Lefty Frizzell	3:04
2.	"I Love You a Thousand Ways"	Frizzell, Beck	2:46
3.	"My Bucket's Got a Hole in It"	Clarence Williams	2:29
4.	"Is It Only That Your Lonely"	Aaron Schroeder, Ben Weisman	2:21
5.	"I Want to Be With You Always"	Frizzell, Beck	3:03
6.	"If You're Ever Lonely Darling"	Frizzell	2:21
