= Roots, Volume 1 =

Studio album by Merle Haggard
- Released: November 6, 2001
- Genre: Country
- Length: 33:32
- Label: ANTI-/Epitaph
- Producer: Merle Haggard

Merle Haggard chronology
Two Old Friends (2001)	Roots, Volume 1 (2001)	The Peer Sessions (2002)

Roots, Volume 1 is the fifty-third studio album by American country singer Merle Haggard, released in 2001. It reached Number 47 on the Billboard Country Albums chart.

== Background ==
After the success of Haggard's If I Could Only Fly, his first album for the independent label ANTI-, he followed with another successful recording with Norman Stephens, the guitarist for Lefty Frizzell, one of Haggard's major influences. Five of the album's tracks were written by Frizzell, but also pays tribute to Hank Williams and Hank Thompson. Haggard also contributes the original composition "More Than My Old Guitar."

== Reception ==
Professional ratings
Review scores
Source	Rating
AllMusic	4.5/5 stars
Robert Christgau	(2-star Honorable Mention)

In his AllMusic review, critic Stephen Thomas Erlewine called Roots, Volume 1 an "unexpected return to how country records used to be made" and "an album filled with small gems, but they add up to a large triumph–a rich, masterful album that's not just the best country album of 2001, but one of Haggard's finest moments."

== Track listing ==
1. "Always Late with Your Kisses" (Lefty Frizzell, Blackie Crawford) – 3:14
2. "More Than My Old Guitar" (Merle Haggard) – 3:28
3. "If You've Got the Money I've Got the Time" (Frizzell, Jim Beck) – 3:02
4. "Look What Thoughts Will Do" (Beck, Little Jimmy Dickens, Dub Dickerson, Frizzell, Richard Duncan James) – 2:28
5. "My Baby's Just Like Money" (Frizzell) – 2:27
6. "Honky Tonkin'" (Hank Williams) – 2:51
7. "Runaway Mama" (Haggard) – 4:08
8. "I'll Sign My Heart Away" (Hank Thompson) – 2:29
9. "I've Got a Tender Heart" (Haggard) – 2:21
10. "The Wild Side of Life" (Arlie Carter, William Warren) – 2:42
11. "Take These Chains from My Heart" (Fred Rose, Hy Heath) – 2:42
12. "I Want to Be with You Always" (Frizzell, Beck) – 3:00

== Personnel ==
- Merle Haggard – vocals, guitar
- Norm Hamlet – steel guitar
- Theresa Lane Haggard – background vocals, percussion
- Abe Manuel, Jr. – fiddle, mandolin, background vocals
- Billy McGill – guitar
- Chester Smith – guitar
- Norman Stephens – guitar
- Redd Volkaert – guitar
- Doug Colosio – piano
- Eddie Curtis – bass
- Johnnie Barber – drums
- Brooks Liggatt – drums

Production notes:

- Merle Haggard – producer
- Lou Bradley – engineer
- Bob McGill – engineer
- Doug Sax – mastering
- Robert Hadley – mastering
- Jesse Fischer – art direction, design
- Piper Ferguson – photography
- Johnny Whiteside – liner notes

== Chart performance ==
Chart (2001)	Peak position
U.S. Billboard Top Country Albums	47
U.S. Billboard Independent Albums	26
