= Stardust (Willie Nelson album) =

Studio album by Willie Nelson
- Released: April 1978
- Recorded: December 3–12, 1977
- Studio: Enactron Truck
- Genres: Country; pop; jazz; folk
- Length: 36:43
- Label: Columbia
- Producer: Booker T. Jones

Willie Nelson chronology
Waylon & Willie (1978)	Stardust (1978)	Sings Kristofferson (1979)

Stardust is the 22nd studio album by Willie Nelson, released in April 1978. Its ten songs consist entirely of American standards that Nelson picked from among his favorites. Nelson asked Booker T. Jones, who was his neighbor in Malibu at the time, to arrange a version of "Moonlight in Vermont". Impressed with Jones's work, Nelson asked him to produce the entire album. Nelson's decision to record such well-known tracks was controversial among Columbia executives because he had distinguished himself in the outlaw country genre. Recording the album took only ten days.

Stardust was met with high sales and near-universal positive reviews. It peaked at number 1 in Billboard's Top Country Albums and number 30 in the Billboard 200. Meanwhile, it charted at number 1 in Canadian RPM's Country Albums and number 28 in RPM's Top Albums. The singles "Blue Skies" and "All of Me" peaked, respectively, at numbers one and three in Billboard's Hot Country Singles.

In 1979, Nelson won a Grammy Award for Best Male Country Vocal Performance for the song "Georgia on My Mind". Stardust was on the Billboard's Country Album charts for ten years—from its release until 1988. The album also reached number one in New Zealand and number five in Australia in 1980. In 2012, the album was ranked number 260 on Rolling Stone magazine's list of the 500 greatest albums of all time. It was originally certified platinum by the Recording Industry Association of America in December 1978. In 1984, when it was certified triple platinum, Nelson was the highest-grossing concert act in the United States. By 2002, the album was certified quintuple platinum, and it was later inducted into the 2015 Grammy Hall of Fame class.

== Background and recording ==
After the critical and commercial success of 1975's Red Headed Stranger, Nelson became one of the most recognized artists in country music. He replicated this success in 1976, releasing Wanted! The Outlaws (featuring Waylon Jennings, Jessi Colter, and Tompall Glaser), which became the genre's first certified platinum album. His 1977 release To Lefty from Willie peaked at number 3 on Billboard's Top Country Albums.

By 1977, Nelson had decided to record a collection of American pop standards to follow. At the time, Nelson lived in Malibu, California. While he spent the summer days jogging on the beach, he reminisced about the songs that inspired him to start a career in music and about the influence Frank Sinatra had on him. On a trip to Nashville, he mentioned his plan to Columbia Records executive Rick Blackburn. Blackburn had a negative reaction to Nelson's idea, and he recommended that he focus on writing new material instead. Nelson told Blackburn that his younger audience would not know the songs, while he expected to reach older audiences that did not listen to his music at the time.

Nelson was living in the same neighborhood in Malibu as producer Booker T. Jones. After one of his morning runs, Nelson encountered Jones in the neighborhood, and the two of them became acquainted. Nelson was aware of Jones's work with the M.G.'s. He later visited Jones at his home to try some of the material he had in mind for his next album. The two became friends, and Nelson asked Jones to arrange "Moonlight in Vermont" for him. Pleased by the results, he later asked Jones to produce his next album.

"Georgia on My Mind"
For the song, Nelson won a Grammy Award for best male country performance in 1979.

Nelson selected his ten favorite pop songs from his childhood, starting with "Stardust". Nelson and his sister, Bobbie, had sheet music for the song that he had tried to perform with his guitar but did not like that arrangement. Jones adapted the song for Nelson, who also picked "Georgia on My Mind", "Blue Skies", "All of Me", "Unchained Melody", "September Song", "On the Sunny Side of the Street", "Moonlight in Vermont", "Don't Get Around Much Anymore", and "Someone to Watch Over Me" for the album. Initially, Nelson expressed to Jones his doubts about recording "Georgia on My Mind", as he compared his rendition to that of Ray Charles. Jones told him, "Ray did it his way, and you'll do it yours." Following Jones's advice, Nelson decided to create his own version of each of the songs with the support of Jones's arrangements.

Nelson then approached Brian Ahern to use the recording trailer parked at his home in the Hollywood Hills, Enactron Truck Studio. Ahern set up cables leading from the console of the truck to his own house, where the musicians played. The band worked on the songs that were produced using a few takes in the living room, while harmonicist Mickey Raphael did his part in a tiled bathroom shower. Jones decided to keep the arrangements sparse, without the use of backup singers or additional strings. It was recorded from December 3–12, 1977.

The executives of Columbia Records were not convinced that the album would sell well because the project was a radical departure from Nelson's earlier success with the outlaw movement. The album spanned pop, jazz, and folk music styles, in addition to country. Nelson's contract with the label granted him total creative control of his works. Nelson's decision not to use a photograph of himself for the cover of the recording was further criticized by Columbia but dismissed by the singer. The cover art featured a painting of the Pleiades constellation made by Susanna Clark. The executives of Columbia then decided to release fewer copies of the album.

== Release and reception ==
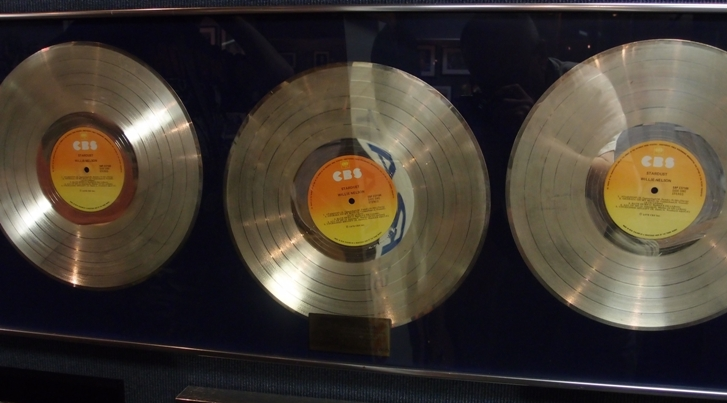
Triple platinum certification of Stardust by RIANZ

Stardust was released in April 1978. The album started to sell well, and Columbia reversed its decision and issued more copies of it. The release reached number one on the Billboard Top Country Albums chart (and would stay there until June 1988) and peaked at number 30 on the Billboard 200. Meanwhile, the songs "Blue Skies" and "All of Me" peaked at numbers one and three, respectively, on Billboard's Hot Country Songs. Stardust was certified platinum in December 1978, and it was named Top Country Album of the year for 1978. It charted at number one in Canadian RPM's Country Albums, while it charted at number 28 in RPM's Top Albums.

The August 14, 1978, issue of Newsweek featured Nelson on the cover with the title "King of Country Music". He was interviewed by staff writer Pete Axthelm. Nelson became the highest-grossing concert act in the United States. In 1979, he won a Grammy for Best Male Country Vocal Performance for "Georgia on My Mind". In 1979, "September Song" peaked at number 15 in Billboard's Hot Country Singles. Stardust spent two years on the Billboard 200, and the album charted 540 weeks (ten years) on Top Country Albums. On January 19, 1991, Stardust logged its 551st and final week on the Billboard Country Album Chart. In 1980, the album ranked at number one in New Zealand top albums, while it ranked at number five in Australian top albums.

In 1984, Stardust was certified triple platinum, earning US$2.1 million (equivalent to $6.51 million in 2025). It was certified quadruple platinum in 1990 and quintuple platinum in 2002. It was ranked by Rolling Stone at number 260 in The 500 Greatest Albums of All Time.

=== Contemporary reviews ===
Professional ratings
Review scores
Source	Rating
The Village Voice	A−

Stardust received positive reviews from most publications, both for its original release and for its various reissues. Rolling Stone welcomed the release as it considered that "[f]or all the sleek sophistication of the material, Stardust is as down-home as the Legion dance." The reviewer continued, "[T]hese tunes have become part of the folk music of exurban America. And that's the way Nelson plays them—spare and simple, with a jump band's verve and a storyteller's love of a good tale." Of Nelson's performance, the publication said: "[H]e's displaying the tools of a journeyman musician's trade—worn smooth and polished by constant use—and when he lays them out this way, they kind of look like works of art."

Billboard delivered a favorable review. The publication felt that it was an "unusual pairing of artist and producer", while adding that it "works well". It remarked Nelson's "distinctive, soft vocal style", while considering that "all of the material seems well suited to his easygoing indication style as Nelson backs himself with guitar and gets help with guitar, drums, keyboards, bass and harmonica." Texas Monthly also favored the album but noted the difference with previous Nelson recordings: "Stardust blends the stark economy of Red Headed Stranger with an underlying current of church spiritualism. More often than not it works. Though the selections are all at least twenty years old, the songs withstand the test of time. Occasionally when Willie's voice seems to crack, I do miss the more familiar hard-bitten whine that accompanies his usual fare like "Whiskey River". But nonetheless this is a sterling effort."

The Los Angeles Times favored the album; for the reviewer, the tracks represented "a warmly refreshing merger of earthy rural vocals and sophisticated urban songs." It called Nelson's performances "spare, sincere, soft and warm enough to invite comparisons with Crosby and Sinatra." The review concluded that the release showed that Nelson was "also at home in more conventional pop streams" and that he " not only knows how to create good music, he knows where to find it—and how to bring it out in all its sublimity." The Chicago Tribune stressed Nelson's decision to record classic tunes, as the review noted that he "directs the attention of his throng of young fans" to music "for his own (or an older generation)." It compared his vocal performances to those of his own repertoire numbers, "Night Life" and "Crazy". Meanwhile, Jones's production was considered "appropriately simple, clean and respectful of both songs and singer." The New York Daily News deemed it an "interesting and enjoyably flavored album." The Pittsburgh Press mentioned Nelson's phrasing that resulted in "a pure, plainly pretty sound." In its review, the Gannett News Service considered that "Hoagy Carmichael would be proud." New Times wrote: "In Texas, some folks swear that Willie could sing "The Star-Spangled Banner" and make it sound soulful. This collection of hoary old standards is the next best thing to testing that proposition directly." Orange Coast praised Nelson's performance of the standards: "Willie Nelson is perhaps the finest male singer in country music. [...] [H]is phrasing and sense of understated drama have caused him to be compared with the best jazz singers. Now he's released an album of old pop standards, Stardust (Columbia), and you can almost hear the stirrings of an outlaw uprising between the grooves. [...] [A]lthough it's definitively no step forward in Nelson's career, it's still a pleasurable showcase of his considerable artistry as a vocalist. Plus, even though he's dealing with the sophisticated likes of Irving Berlin, George Gershwin, and Kurt Weill, he remains essentially country."

Village Voice critic Robert Christgau said, "I'm real happy this record exists, not just because Nelson can be a great interpretive singer—his "Moonlight in Vermont" is a revelation—but because he's provided me with ten great popular songs that I've never had much emotional access to."

== Legacy ==
Stardust was reissued on compact disc in 1985. A 1999 release of the album included the additional tracks "Scarlet Ribbons" and "I Can See Clearly Now". In 2008, Columbia Records issued a version of Stardust subtitled 30th Anniversary Legacy Edition. The album contained a 16-track bonus disc of standards from Nelson's other albums. None of the bonus tracks date back to the original Stardust sessions.

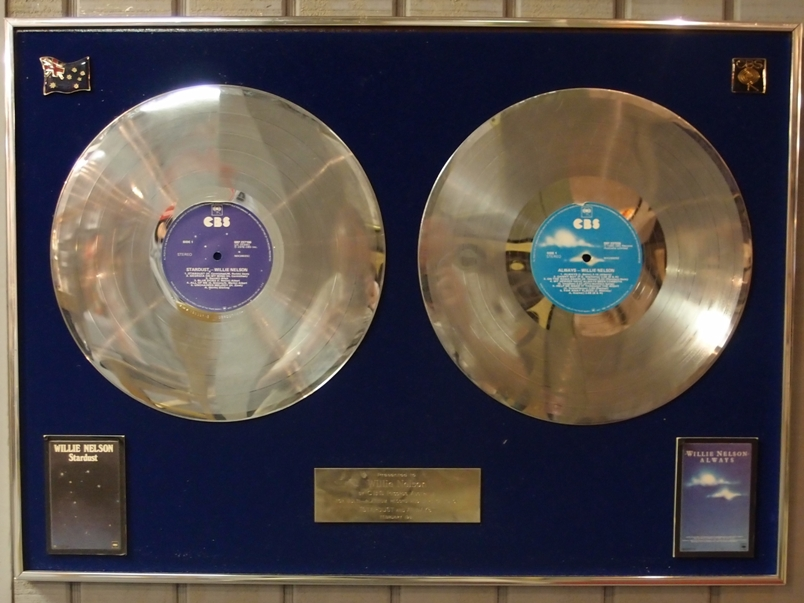
Multi-platinum certification of Stardust in Australia

For the 35th anniversary of the release, Nelson performed the entire album live with the accompaniment of an orchestra directed by David Campbell in two shows on August 9–10, 2013 at the Hollywood Bowl in Los Angeles, California. In December 2014, the induction of Stardust into the Grammy Hall of Fame was announced; the record was included among the 2015 class.

=== Retrospective reviews ===
Professional ratings
Review scores
Source	Rating
AllMusic	5/5 stars
Pitchfork	9.3/10
Zagat Survey	5/5 stars

Stephen Thomas Erlewine of AllMusic said that the album "showcases Nelson's skills as a musician and his entire aesthetic—where there is nothing separating classic American musical forms, it can all be played together—perhaps better than any other album, which is why it was a sensation upon its release and grows stronger with each passing year."

Pitchfork wrote: "Thirty years ago, Willie Nelson took a typically left turn and followed up a string of successful albums with a cover album of songs made famous by decidedly non-country musicians like Dean Martin, Frank Sinatra, and Louis Armstrong. [...] What makes the record so thrilling and very often beautiful—and what separates him from today's ham-handed vocalists—is Nelson's facility as an interpreter. [...] With his tender, textured voice and intuitively around-the-beat phrasing, Nelson gives these songs fresh readings, with just the touch of sentimentality and nostalgia they demand. The cliché 'makes them his own' certainly applies here: He sings them as they've never been sung before or since, which is quite a feat considering their age and popularity. Hardened from endless touring into a tough, tight roadhouse revue, Nelson's band gives a surprisingly supple performance on each song, which reinforces the album's sweetly ruminative mood. Producer Booker T. Jones, of Stax fame, facilitates every aspect of the band's sound, showcasing the performers' range while ensuring the arrangements play to the lyrics and vocals without overwhelming them. [...] Stardust set both the template for Nelson's career and the standard. Few artists have treat the American Songbook so affectionately and so cavalierly."

Zagat Survey wrote: "On this legendary departure from the traditional Willie, America's pop troubadour puts his one-of-a-kind touch on old pop standards, finding common ground between outlaw country and mellow. [...] Sweet and simple, more bow tie than bandana, each song is turned."

== Track listing ==
Side one
No.	Title	Writer(s)	Length
1.	"Stardust"	Hoagy Carmichael; Mitchell Parish	3:53
2.	"Georgia on My Mind"	Hoagy Carmichael; Stuart Gorrell	4:20
3.	"Blue Skies"	Irving Berlin	3:34
4.	"All of Me"	Seymour Simons; Gerald Marks	3:54
5.	"Unchained Melody"	Alex North; Hy Zaret	3:50
Total length:			19:31

Side two
No.	Title	Writer(s)	Length
1.	"September Song"	Kurt Weill; Maxwell Anderson	4:35
2.	"On the Sunny Side of the Street"	Jimmy McHugh; Dorothy Fields	2:36
3.	"Moonlight in Vermont"	Karl Suessdorf; John Blackburn	3:25
4.	"Don't Get Around Much Anymore"	Duke Ellington; Bob Russell	2:33
5.	"Someone to Watch Over Me"	George Gershwin; Ira Gershwin	4:03
Total length:			17:12

=== Reissues ===
1999 CD edition bonus tracks
No.	Title	Writer(s)	Length
11.	"Scarlet Ribbons"	Evelyn Danzig; Jack Segal	4:30
12.	"I Can See Clearly Now"	Johnny Nash	4:18

30th Anniversary Legacy Edition - Disc two: More From the Great American Songbook
No.	Title	Writer(s)	Length
1.	"What a Wonderful World" (from What a Wonderful World, 1988)	George David Weiss; Bob Thiele	2:16
2.	"Basin Street Blues" (from The Promiseland, 1986)	Spencer Williams	4:13
3.	"I'm Confessin' (That I Love You)" (from Somewhere Over the Rainbow, 1981)	Doc Dougherty; Ellis Reynolds; A. Neiburg	3:34
4.	"I'm Gonna Sit Right Down and Write Myself a Letter" (from Somewhere Over the Rainbow, 1981)	Fred E. Ahlert; Joe Young	3:01
5.	"The Gypsy" (from Angel Eyes, 1984)	Billy Reid	4:29
6.	"Mona Lisa" (from Somewhere Over the Rainbow, 1981)	Jay Livingston; Ray Evans	2:34
7.	"Ac-Cent-Tchu-Ate the Positive" (from What a Wonderful World, 1988)	Johnny Mercer; Harold Arlen	2:04
8.	"Ole Buttermilk Sky" (from What a Wonderful World, 1988)	Carmichael; Jack Brooks	2:50
9.	"That Lucky Old Sun" (from The Sound in Your Mind, 1976)	Haven Gillespie; Beasley Smith	2:24
10.	"Little Things Mean a Lot" (from Born for Trouble, 1990)	Edith Lindeman; Carl Stutz	3:36
11.	"Cry" (from City of New Orleans, 1984)	Churchill Kohlman	3:48
12.	"You'll Never Know" (from Without a Song, 1983)	Mack Gordon; Harry Warren	4:10
13.	"Tenderly" (from One for the Road, 1979)	Jack Lawrence; Walter Lloyd Gross	4:01
14.	"Stormy Weather" (from One for the Road, 1979)	Arlen; Ted Koehler	2:25
15.	"One for My Baby (and One More for the Road)" (from One for the Road, 1979)	Arlen; Johnny Mercer	2:36
16.	"Angel Eyes" (from Angel Eyes, 1984)	Earl Brent; Matt Dennis	4:50

== Personnel ==
Musicians

- Willie Nelson – vocals, guitar
- Booker T. Jones – Hammond organ, piano
- Bobbie Nelson – piano
- Mickey Raphael – harmonica
- Jody Payne – guitar
- Bee Spears, Chris Ethridge – bass
- Paul English, Rex Ludwick – drums

Recording studio

- Booker T. Jones – production, arrangements
- Bradley Hartman – engineer
- Donivan Cowart – engineer
- Bernie Grundman – mastering
- Jules Chaiken – string conductor

== Chart performance ==
Albums

Sales chart performance of Stardust
Year	Chart	Peak position
1978	US Top Country Albums (Billboard)	1
1978	US Billboard 200	30
1978	Canada Country Albums (RPM)	1
1978	Canada Top Albums/CDs (RPM)	28
1980	RIANZ Albums Chart (New Zealand)	1
1980	Australia (Kent Music Report)	5

Year-end charts

Year-end sales chart performance of Stardust
Year	Chart	Peak position
1978	US Billboard Top Country Albums	1
1980	Australia (Kent Music Report)	6
1980	New Zealand Albums (RMNZ)	6

== Certifications ==
Region	Certification	Certified units/sales
Australia (ARIA)	Platinum	50,000^{^}
United States (RIAA)	5× Platinum	5,000,000^{^}
^{^} Shipments figures based on certification alone.
