= Jimmy Rollins (musician) =

American singer-songwriter

Jimmy Rollins is an American guitarist, songwriter, audio engineer, and record producer from Dallas who flourished in the 1950s, playing guitar on recordings as sideman with Lefty Frizzell, Billy Walker, Marty Robbins, and Sid King and the Five Strings. Rollins composed songs recorded by Connie Smith, Jean Shepard, and Porter Wagoner. As an audio engineer, he worked at the Jim Beck Studio in Dallas during the mid-1950s and in 1956, he worked at Tom Merriman's recording studio at 3104 Maple Avenue, Dallas.

== Selected compositions ==
- "I Thought of You," lyrics & music by Rollins (1955; renewed 1983)
- "The Melody Ranch Girl"
- "Crazy Alligator (with the blue suede shoes) lyrics & music by Bill Peck, pseudonym of Bill Pecchi (né William F. Pecchi Sr.; 1921–2001) & Rollins (1956)
- "Dreamy Valley," lyrics & music by Bob Belyeu & Rollins (1956)
- "The Ghost of Your Love," lyrics & music by Rollins & Dick Thornton (1956)
- "How Quick," lyrics & music by W. D. Patty, Rollins & Billy Joe Knight. (1954)
- "Passing Love Affair," lyrics & music by Jack Rhodes & Rollins (1955)
- "Rock and Roll Guitar," lyrics & music by Bill Peck, pseudonym of Bill Pecchi (né William F. Pecchi Sr.; 1921–2001), & Rollins (1956)
- "Sugar Diet," lyrics & music by Clay Allen, Jim Beck & Rollins (1956)
- "When We Are Dancing Together," lyrics & music by Naomi F. Higgs & Rollins (1954)

== Selected audio ==
- Marty Robbins

"It's a Long Long Ride,", lyrics & music by Marty Robbins, Acuff-Rose Publications (© 1953)
Recorded at the Jim Beck Studio, Dallas, September 1953
Musicians: Marty Robbins (vocal), Jimmy Rollins (lead guitar), Joe Knight (guitar), Joe Vincent (steel guitar), Grundy Harbert (bass), Fred Cantu (drums), Harold Carmack (piano), Johnny Gimble (scat singing & fiddle)
