= Weldon Rogers =

American songwriter, radio disc jockey, and record producer (1927–2004)

Weldon Nelson Rogers (30 October 1927 Marietta, Oklahoma – 13 September 2004, Perryton, Texas) was an American songwriter, singer of country and rockabilly, radio disc jockey, and record producer. He co-founded Je–Wel Records with Jean Oliver (née Bobbie Jean Oliver; 1939–2008) to produce, as Je-Wel's first record, the first record for The Teen Kings in 1956. Oliver's father, Chester Oliver (né Chester Calvin Oliver; 1907–2000), (Note: Chester Oliver also, in the late 1950s, provided financial backing for Triple-D Records and Blue Moon Records, both of Seminole. (Brown, "Rockin'" Robin; né Robert William Brown; born 1945. "Record Labels of West Texas".)) an oil and gas industry lease pumper, (Note: A "pumper," in the North American oil and gas exploration and production industry, is an occupational title of a person who oversees daily operations of producing wells. The term is synonymous with "lease operator". (Hyne)) provided financial backing for the Je–Wel label.

== Teen Kings ==
The members of The Teen Kings were:

- Roy Orbison (1936–1988) – vocals, guitar
- Jack Kennelly (1937–2009) – upright bass (Note: Jack Desmond Kennelly, later known in Hollywood as Jackson D. Kane (born June 30, 1937 Madera County, California; died October 9, 2009 Littleton, Colorado).)
- Peanuts Wilson (1935–1980) – rhythm guitar
- James Emitt Morrow (1936–2020) – electric mandolin (played through an Echoplex)
- Billy Pat Ellis – drums

The Teen Kings first record (and Orbison's first recording) was:

- Je-Wel 101

Side A: "Trying to Get You", by Charles Singleton and Rose Marie McCoy
Side B: "Ooby Dooby", by Wade Moore and Dick Penner

== Selected discography ==
Original releases

1. Weldon Rogers & Wanda Faye Wolfe Side B: "Women Drivers", by Weldon Rogers (JE 103)
2. Rogers Brothers with the Western Melodiers – vocal duet: Weldon Rogers & Willie Rogers (JE 102) Side A: "Dim Lights, Thick Smoke (And Loud, Loud Music)" (vocal duet: Weldon Rogers & Willie Rogers) 45-JE-102-A
  Side B: "For Always; Yes Forever" (vocal: Weldon Rogers) 45-JE-102-B
3. Weldon Rogers (JE 103) (1959) Side A: "This Song Is Just for You" 45-JE-103-A
  Side B: "Everybody Wants You" (Weldon Rogers & Wanda Wolfe) 45-JE-103-B
4. Weldon Rogers (JE 105) (May 1960) "Heaven's Back Door"
  "Cimarron"
5. Weldon Rogers (JE 107) (September 1960) "Lying Lips and Cheating Heart"
  "If I Had One Day to Live"
6. Weldon Rogers, Wanda Rogers (Chart 1220) (45 rpm single) OCLC 732364095 Side A: "Don't Steal My Style" — SoN-19242 (matrix)
  Side B: "Two Empty Glasses — SoN-19241 (matrix)
7. Weldon Rogers & The Teen Kings (Imperial X5451) (45 rpm single) (1957) † Side A: "So Long, Good Luck and Goodbye", by Weldon Rogers, IM-1400
  Side B: "Tryin' to Get to You", by Weldon Rogers, IM-1401 (July 8, 1957)
8. Wanda Rogers, Weldon Rogers (Columbia 4-43322) (45 rpm single) OCLC 732360598 Sides A & B produced by Donald Firth Law (1902–1982) and Frank Mervyn Jones (1926–2005)
  Side A: "Bright Lights" — ZSP110861-1C (matrix)
  Side B: "Lying Lips and Cheating Heart" — ZSP110862-1C (matrix)
9. Wanda Rogers, Weldon Rogers (Columbia 4-43492) (45 rpm single) OCLC 732360626 Sides A & B produced by Donald Firth Law (1901–1982) and Frank Mervyn Jones (1926–2005)
  Side A: "The Longest Night" — JZSP112653-1B (matrix)
  Side B: "Old Memories Keep Returning" — JZSP112652-1B (matrix)
10. Pete Cassell, Wanda Rogers, Weldon Rogers, Carl Butler, Pearl Butler (Columbia 4-43030) (45 rpm single) OCLC 732360499 Sides A & B produced by Donald Firth Law (1902–1982) and Frank Mervyn Jones (1926–2005)
  Side A: "Just a Message" — JZSP-77271-1E (matrix); Radio station copy
  Side B: "I'm Hanging Up the Phone" — JZSP-77270-1F (matrix); Radio station copy

––––––––––––––––––––

† While living in California, Rogers landed a recording contract with Imperial Records, but, in doing so, he presented Orbison's recording of "Trying to Get to You" as his own. Lewis Robert Chudd (1911–1998) of Imperial agreed for Weldon to again record at Norman Petty Recording Studios backed up by The Teen Kings, who, in December 1956, had split from Orbison. Four songs were pressed including "So Long, Good Luck, Goodbye" (which was composed on the drive to the session). This side was selected for release along with a re-recording of "Trying To Get To You". When the record was issued, there was a snafu. Imperial company used Orbison's version but credited Rogers. There then arose a series of disagreements between Rogers and Chudd that led to a cessation of Imperial releases of Rogers. Rogers asked for, and got, a release from his contract.

Re-releases

1. Weldon Rogers, Tryin' To Get To You, Bear Family Records, (January 26, 1998) (CD) OCLC 236174823 Track Song
  1. "So Long, Good Luck, Goodbye"
  2. "Trying To Get To You"
  3. "Sale of Broken Hearts"
  4. "My Only Love"
  5. "Please Return My Broken Heart"
  6. "I'm Building a ???" ("On the Moon")
  7. "Dim Lights, Thick Smoke" ("and Loud, Loud Music")
  8. "For Always, Yes Forever"
  9. "Everybody Wants You"
  10. "I Still Want You"
  11. "I'm Gonna Be Around"
  12. "If I Had One Day to Live"
  13. "Lying Lips and a Cheatin' Heart"
  14. "You Made Me Love You"
  15. "Talk Of The Town"
  16. "That Was in the Deal"
  17. "Bright Lights"
  18. "This Song Is Just For You"
  19. "Back Door of Heaven"
  20. "Cimarron"
  21. "As Long As You Are Mine"
  22. "Living With a Heartache"
  23. "Our Rendezvous"
  24. "I'm Gonna Love Again"
  25. "I Lost the Moon"
  26. "I Haven't Seen Myself in Years"
  27. "Mr. Mountain Lion"
  28. "I've Got the Yearning"
  29. "Would You Still Want Me"

Re-releases via MP3 downloads

2. Doo Wop Finders Keepers. Vol. 3
  Label: Ling Music Group (May 27, 2011)
  1. "Tryin' to Get to You"
3. The Ultimate 50's Rockin' Sci-Fi Disc
  The Viper Label (October 12, 2009)
  OCLC 456199614
  1. "I'm Building a ???" ("On the Moon")

== Compositions recorded by other artists ==
Rogers' composition, "So Long, Good Luck and Goodbye", was recorded by Bob Dylan.

== Compositions ==
1. "So Long, Good Luck, and Goodbye", w & m Weldon Rogers (©1957)
2. "Sale of Broken Hearts", w & m Weldon Rogers (©1957)
3. "Lying Lips and Cheating Heart", w & m Weldon Rogers (©1960)
4. "If I Had One Day to Live", w & m Weldon Rogers (©1960)
5. "I've Got the Yearning", w Wanda Rogers, m Weldon Rogers (©1961)
6. "As Long as You Are Mine", w Weldon Rogers, m Wanda Rogers (©1962)
7. "Heaven in Your Arms", w Wanda Rogers, m Weldon Rogers (©1963)
8. "I'm Hanging Up the Phone", w Wanda Rogers, m Weldon Rogers (©1963)
9. "Longest Night", w Weldon Rogers, m Wanda Rogers (©1965)
10. "Two Empty Glasses", w Wanda Rogers, m Weldon Rogers (©1965)
11. "Longest Night", w Weldon Rogers, m Wanda Rogers (©1965)
12. "Old Memories Keep Returning", w & m Weldon Rogers (©1965)
13. "That Was in the Deal", by Weldon Rogers (©1966; ©1980)
14. "I Haven't Seen Myself in Years" (©1968)
15. "Would You Still Want Me?" (©1968)
16. "Mr. Mountain Lion" (©1968)
17. "Our Rendezvous" (©1969)
18. "How Times Have Changed" (©1971)
19. "I Lost the Moon" (©1972)
20. "I'm Gonna Love Again" (©1972)
21. "Bad Boy Slippin' Out of Me" (©2008)

== Family ==
Weldon was one of five children born to Otto Brigamyer Rogers (1903–1966) and Sadie Josephine Clifton (maiden 1908–1997) who were farmers. Weldon Rogers – on February 27, 1959, in Tijuana, Mexico – married singer and songwriter Wanda Faye Rogers (née Wanda Faye Narmore; 1929–1910). Both of them had been married before. They divorced October 2, 1967, in Jackson County, Oregon.

Weldon Nelson Rogers died September 13, 2004, in Perryton, Texas, and is buried in the Ochiltree Cemetery, Perryton, Texas.

== Bibliography ==
=== References ===
- ASCAP Biographical Dictionary (4th ed.). New York: Compiled for the American Society of Composers, Authors and Publishers by Jaques Cattell Press and R.R. Bowker Company. 1980. ISBN 9780835212830 – via Internet Archive. ISBN 0-8352-1283-1. LCCN 80--65351. OCLC 1229214905 (all editions).
1. "Wilson, Johnny Ancil (Peanuts)". p. 547.
- Escott, Colin (2002). "Chapter 1: Roy Orbison". Roadkill on the Three-Chord Highway – Art and Trash in American Popular Music. Routledge. pp. 9–12, 15. ISBN 9780415937825 – via Google Books. ISBN 0415-9378-2-5, 978-0-4159-3782-5, 0-4159-3783-3, 978-0-4159-3783-2. OCLC 977856894.
- Hyne, Norman John, PhD (born 1939) (2014). "Pumper". Dictionary of Petroleum Exploration, Drilling & Production (2nd ed.). Tulsa: PennWell Corporation. p. 412. ISBN 978-1-5937-0313-4. LCCN 2013023126. OCLC 942306707 – via Google Books.
- Ingman, John (1997). A.O.K.: Record Labels of West Texas & New Mexico. Brimington, England: Ingman Music Research. pp. 48–49 – via Google Books. OCLC 755283567 (all editions).
- Odessa American, The (September 26, 1980). "Deaths – Johnny A. Wilson" (obituary). Vol. 55, no. 271. Odessa, Texas. p. 2A (column 5) – via Newspapers.com (born November 28, 1935, [Rivesville] West Virginia; died September 19, 1980, Donelson, Tennessee; moved to Odessa, Texas, as a child).
- "James Emmit Morrow" (obituary). March 8, 2020 – via Dignity Memorial (born January 12, 1936 – died March 7, 2020, " ... graduated from Wink High School in 1955").
- "Weldon Rogers, 76, of Perryton, Died September 13, 2004". The Perryton Herald (obituary). Vol. 87. Perryton, Texas. September 16, 2004. OCLC 14257041.
- The Wildcat (yearbook). Wink, Texas: Wink High School. 1955. OCLC 20793131.
- Wilkinson, Tony (née Anthony Leonard Wilkinson; 1943–2013). "Weldon Rogers" (biography) – via tims.blackcat.nl (originally published as "This Is My Story" in the Yahoo! Group "Shakin' All Over"). Collected and compiled by Dik de Heer and posted on the website, tims.blackcat.nl of Norway. "TIMS" in the url is an acronym for Wilkinson's body of work, "This Is My Story." (author bio: "Tony Wilkinson Obituary", 2013, by John Howard, UK ROCK Magazine).
