= Listen to Lefty =

Studio album by Lefty Frizzell
- Released: June 1952
- Recorded: July 25, 1950–1952
- Genre: Country
- Label: Columbia
- Producer: Don Law

Lefty Frizzell chronology
Songs of Jimmie Rodgers (1951)	Listen to Lefty (1952)	One and Only (1959)

Listen to Lefty is a 1952 studio album recorded by Lefty Frizzell. The album includes many of his hit singles released from 1950, including two of his most well known songs, If You've Got the Money I've Got the Time and I Love You a Thousand Ways. It also includes the fan favorite 1952 hit, Mom and Dad's Waltz.

== Content ==
Listen to Lefty is one of the very few albums released by Lefty in the 1950s and only the second of his then very young career. Many of the songs included, like the 1950 hits noted above and the 1951 hits, "I Want to Be with You Always", "Always Late (With Your Kisses)", "Mom and Dad's Waltz"; and the 1952 hit "Don't Stay Away (Till Love Grows Cold)". The only tracks not hit singles at the time of release, were "Look What Thoughts Will Do", and "If You Can Spare the Time".

Upon the album's release sometime from mid to late 1952, it went mostly unnoticed.

== Track listing ==
Side One
No.	Title	Writer(s)	Length
1.	"If You've Got the Money (I've Got the Time)"	Frizzell, Jim Beck	2:55
2.	"I Want to Be with You Always"	Frizzell, Beck	3:03
3.	"Always Late (With Your Kisses)"	Beck, Blackie Crawford	3:06
4.	"Don't Stay Away"	Frizzell, Loys Sutherland	2:57

Side Two
No.	Title	Writer(s)	Length
1.	"If You Can Spare the Time"	Frizzell, Guidry Tassin	2:29
2.	"Mom and Dad's Waltz"	Frizzell	3:06
3.	"I Love You A Thousand Ways"	Frizzell	2:45
4.	"Look What Thoughts Will Do"	Frizzell, Beck, Dub Dickerson	2:29
