= Let's Live a Little (song) =

Single by Carl Smith

from the album Let's Live a Little
- B-side: "There's Nothing as Sweet as My Baby"
- Released: 1951
- Recorded: 1951
- Genre: Country
- Length: 2:49
- Label: Columbia
- Songwriter(s): Ruth E. Coletharp

Carl Smith singles chronology
"I Overlooked an Orchid (While Searching for a Rose)" (1950)	"Let's Live a Little" (1951)	"There's Nothing as Sweet as My Baby" (1951)

"Let's Live a Little" is a country music song written by Ruth E. Coletharp, recorded by Carl Smith, and released on the Columbia label. In June 1951, it reached No. 2 on the country charts. It spent 20 weeks on the charts and was the No. 9 country record of 1951 based on juke box plays.

The song has been covered by artists, including Jerry Lee Lewis, Tommy Collins, Jimmy Wakely, and Tex Williams.

== See also ==
- List of Billboard Top Country & Western Records of 1951
