= Waylon & Willie =

Studio album by Waylon Jennings and Willie Nelson
- Released: January 1978
- Genres: Country; outlaw country
- Length: 32:50
- Label: RCA Victor
- Producers: Waylon Jennings; Willie Nelson

Waylon Jennings & Willie Nelson chronology
Waylon & Willie (1978)	WWII (1982)

Waylon Jennings chronology
Ol' Waylon (1977)	Waylon & Willie (1978)	I've Always Been Crazy (1978)

Willie Nelson chronology
There'll Be No Teardrops Tonight (1978)	Waylon & Willie (1978)	Stardust (1978)

Singles from Waylon & Willie
- 1. "The Wurlitzer Prize (I Don't Want to Get Over You)" Released: September 1977; 2. "Mammas Don't Let Your Babies Grow Up to Be Cowboys" Released: January 1978

Waylon & Willie is the first collaborative studio album by American singers Waylon Jennings and Willie Nelson, released by RCA Records in 1978. In the US, it stayed at #1 album on the country album charts for ten weeks and would spend a total of 126 weeks on the country charts.

== Background ==
By 1978, Jennings and Nelson had attained country music superstar status. Jennings had three #1 country albums in a row, and his most recent, Ol' Waylon in 1977, included what turned out to be the biggest hit single of his career, "Luckenbach, Texas (Back to the Basics of Love)". Nelson, who had taken a verse on the Jennings single, had enjoyed blockbuster success of his own with the release of his 1975 West Texas epic Red Headed Stranger and did again with Stardust in 1978. After so many one-off collaborations and tours, it was inevitable that they would record an album of duets, although being contracted to different record labels (Waylon with RCA and Willie with Columbia) made matters difficult. According to the RCA executive Jerry Bradley, Jennings initially attempted to overdub his vocals on a few old Nelson recordings (Nelson had recorded for RCA Victor from 1965 to 1972) but struggled to do so. Instead, he approached Columbia Records in Nashville with the idea of recording an album of new duets. In a surprising show of co-operation, Columbia agreed. Jennings and Nelson had achieved great success previously, winning the Country Music Association Award for Duo of the Year for their song "Good Hearted Woman" in 1976, and were the marquee attractions on the Wanted! The Outlaws compilation, country music's first million selling album.

== Recording and composition ==
The album contains three songs sung individually by Jennings and Nelson, as well as five duets. Although it was presented as a new release, several of the tracks had been recorded for some time and had been redone using overdubbing. The Nelson-sung "It's Not Supposed to Be That Way" and "If You Can Touch Her at All" had appeared on Jennings' 1974 album This Time (which Nelson had co-produced), as had the song "Pick Up The Tempo", which is on this LP as a duet. Nelson's guitar playing is noticeably absent on the recording.

Jerry Bradley later recalled, "Waylon come to play those for me. He looked at me and said, 'You don't really like them?' I said 'Well, we'll do well with them, but I don't think there's one as good as what we had with the Outlaws.' He said, 'What about this one?' And that's when he played 'Mammas.'"

"Mammas Don't Let Your Babies Grow Up to Be Cowboys", written by Ed and Patsy Bruce, peaked at number 1 in March 1978, spending four weeks on top of the country music charts. It also reached 42 on the Billboard Hot 100, and won the 1979 Grammy Award for Best Country Performance by a Duo or Group with Vocal. It propelled the album to the top of the Billboard country albums chart. The Waylon-sung "The Wurlitzer Prize (I Don't Want to Get Over You)" also reached number 1, while Nelson's reading of Lee Clayton's "If You Can Touch Her at All" reached #5. The music journalist Stephen Thomas Erlewine of AllMusic observed, "...in retrospect, it looks like where the movement was beginning to slide into predictability, even if both singers are more or less in command of their talents here. Though still at the peak of his popularity, Waylon had begun to slip slightly creatively starting with the very good, but not great, Are You Ready for the Country, which suggested that he was having a little harder time getting a full album of consistently great material together. The patchwork nature of this album suggests that he still had the problem, but since it was divided into three solo songs apiece and five duets, this plays to his strengths, because the limited number of new songs doesn't give him room to stumble."

Jennings' legal problems, including a much publicized cocaine arrest in 1977, were no doubt a distraction and perhaps the inspiration for "I Can Get Off On You", a songwriting collaboration with Nelson (a notorious pothead) that celebrates the triumph of new love over past vices ("Take back the weed, take back the cocaine baby, take back the pills, take back the whiskey too..."). Jennings' cover version of Fleetwood Mac's "Gold Dust Woman" also addresses drugs, and was another example of Jennings' penchant for appropriating FM rock staples; he had previously covered Neil Young's "Are You Ready for the Country" and the Marshall Tucker Band's "Can't You See". Near the conclusion of Kris Kristofferson's "Don't Cuss the Fiddle", Jennings and Nelson began singing "Good Hearted Woman", which has an identical musical arrangement.

The original liner notes, complimenting Jennings and Nelson on their ability to surprise and deliver solid material, were written by Chet Flippo of Rolling Stone. Waylon & Willie was reissued by RCA Records in 2001. This was the first time that the full album was issued on CD in the US; previous US CD issues contained only eight of the album's eleven songs.

== Critical reception ==
Professional ratings
Review scores
Source	Rating
AllMusic	link
Christgau's Record Guide	B+

Rolling Stone ranked Waylon and Willie #30 on its "50 Country Albums Every Rock Fan Should Own", saying, "These old stoner compadres teamed up with startling purpose for this consistently poignant, pleasingly loopy Number One country smash. A last call of circular barroom logic, it evenly splits primo world-weary Willie (the quivering waltz 'If You Can Touch Her at All' and bewildered end-of-the-line lament 'It's Not Supposed to Be That Way') with top-tier wobbly Waylon (his chilling cinéma vérité version of Fleetwood Mac's 'Gold Dust Woman' and the light-touch pathos of 'The Wurlitzer Prize')." While conceding that the album "remains one of their biggest-selling albums," AllMusic thought, "its perennial popularity has more to do with their iconic status - something this album deliberately played up - than the quality of the music, which is, overall, merely good...Since it was cut at a time they were making consistently enjoyable music, it's fun, but it could have been much, much more than it is."

== Track listing ==
No.	Title	Writer(s)	Length
1.	"Mammas Don't Let Your Babies Grow Up to Be Cowboys"	Ed Bruce, Patsy Bruce	2:34
2.	"The Year 2003 Minus 25"	Kris Kristofferson	3:04
3.	"Pick Up the Tempo"	Willie Nelson	2:32
4.	"If You Can Touch Her at All"	Lee Clayton	3:04
5.	"Lookin' for a Feeling"	Waylon Jennings	2:38
6.	"It's Not Supposed to Be That Way"	Nelson	3:20
7.	"I Can Get Off on You"	Jennings, Nelson	2:24
8.	"Don't Cuss the Fiddle"	Kristofferson	3:04
9.	"Gold Dust Woman"	Stevie Nicks	4:00
10.	"A Couple More Years"	Dennis Locorriere, Shel Silverstein	4:02
11.	"The Wurlitzer Prize (I Don't Want to Get Over You)"	Bobby Emmons, Chips Moman	2:08

== Chart performance ==
Chart (1978)	Peak position
U.S. Billboard Top Country Albums	1
U.S. Billboard 200	12
Canadian RPM Country Albums	7
Canadian RPM Top Albums	11

== Certifications ==
Region	Certification	Certified units/sales
United States (RIAA)	2× Platinum	2,000,000^{^}
^{^} Shipments figures based on certification alone.
