= Travelin' Blues =

Song by Jimmie Rodgers
- Released: 1931
- Genre: Country
- Label: Victor
- Songwriter(s): Jimmie Rodgers, Shelly Lee Alley

"Travelin' Blues" is a country music song written by Jimmie Rodgers and Shelly Lee Alley. It was first recorded by Rodgers in 1931.

Lefty Frizzell later covered the song for the Columbia label. In October 1951, Frizzell's version reached No. 6 on the country best seller chart. It spent nine weeks on the charts and was the No. 24 best selling country record of 1951.

The song was also covered by Merle Haggard, Ernest Tubb, Gene Autry, Bob Wills and His Texas Playboys, Bill Monroe, and Tuba Skinny.

== See also ==
- List of Billboard Top Country & Western Records of 1951
