= Don Gililland =

American jazz musician

Don Dow Gililland (commonly misspelled as Gilliland; born 31 January 1939 Dallas, Texas) is a jazz guitarist and composer who recorded three rockabilly hits in 1956 on Sun Records with "Wade & Dick — The College Kids," led by Wade Lee Moore (born 1934) and Dick Penner: "Wild Woman", "Don't Need Your Lovin"', and "Bop Bop Baby".

Gililland got a part as a guitarist in the movie Rock Baby Rock It!, which was being filmed in Dallas in 1956. During the next year, he enrolled at North Texas State University, where he performed with the school's One O'Clock Lab Band. After graduating he worked in clubs with Buster Smith. During the day, he was employed by the Oak Cliff Tribune. He became managing editor, then worked for the Dallas Area Rapid Transit.

"Bop Bop Baby" was included on the soundtrack of Walk the Line, the film biography of Johnny Cash.

== Discography ==
=== As sideman ===
- One O'Clock Lab Band, North Texas Lab Band (90th Floor, 1961) (OCLC 15010703); re-released under the title The Road to Stan (90th Floor, 2009) as a tribute to musicians associated with the Stan Kenton Orchestra (OCLC 501846239)
- Don Jacoby, Swinging Big Sound: Don Jacoby and The College All Stars (Decca, 1961) (OCLC 8983410)
- Wade & Dick – The College Kids, "Bop Bop Baby" b/w "Don't Need Your Lovin' Baby" (Sun, 1957); "Bop Bop Baby" (alternate version) b/w/ "Don't Need Your Lovin' Baby" (1956)
- Dick Penner, "Cindy Lou" (Sun, 1957)
- Sag, Drag and Fall (1955), score composed by Ken Massey and Don Gililland (OCLC 499081157)

== Filmography ==
- Rock Baby Rock It! (1957)
- This World Won't Break (2019)
