= Je–Wel =

Je-Wel
- Founded: 1955
- Founder: Weldon Rogers, Chester Oliver
- Genre: Rock, country
- Country of origin: U.S.
- Location: Odessa, Texas

Je–Wel, latterly renamed Jewel Records, was an independent American record label founded in Odessa, Texas, in 1955 by Weldon Rogers (1927–2004), himself a singer, and Chester Calvin Oliver (1907–2000). Je–Wel is known for having engaged, recorded, and produced fledgling artists from West Texas at the dawn of rock and roll in the 1950s.

== JE-WEL 101 ==
Orbison's name is misspelled on this label.

Je–Wel's most notable production was a recording of The Teen Kings (with Roy Orbison) performing "Ooby Dooby". The session was recorded March 4, 1956, at Norman Petty's studio in Clovis, New Mexico. "Ooby Dooby" was on the B side and "Tryin' to Get to You" was on the A Side. The record – manufactured in Phoenix, Arizona – was issued as JE-WEL 101 around March 16, 1956. According to the authorised biography of Roy Orbison, this was Orbison's first record release.

Je–Wel 101 is considered one of the world's rarest and most collectible records. It exists in both 78 and 45 rpm versions with at least three label variations: the first pressing misspells Roy's surname "Oribson" and many copies credit "Trying to Get You" instead of "Trying to Get to You.'

== Naming and founding ==
The title on this label, "Trying to Get You" is incorrect. The correct title is "Trying to Get to You"

Je–Wel was formed to promote and record The Teen Kings. The name "Je–Wel" was derived from the first letters of the middle name of Bobbie Jean Oliver (1939–2008) (daughter of co-founder Chester Oliver) and Weldon.

Bobbie Jean Oliver was a singer and accordion player with Western Melodiers, a band that backed up other local artists, including Weldon and Willie Rogers. Jean Oliver also frequently performed with the Teen Kings, although she was never a member. In 1993, Chester's wife, Acia, told John Ingman, a journalist with Now Dig This, that it was Jean who had persuaded her parents to finance The Teen Kings' recordings, and that Rogers made little contribution. Weldon Rogers and Jean Oliver had been briefly husband and wife before annulling their marriage at the insistence of Jean's parents. Jean, later, had dated James Morrow, a member of The Teen Kings, who, when not appearing at the Archway Club in Monahans, Texas, usually performed at the Saturday Night Jamboree in Jal, New Mexico. That is where James Morrow met and dated Jean Oliver. Jean's father, Chester, had worked for Phillips Petroleum, and the family lived in Seminole, Texas.

== Master tapes ==
The Je–Wel tape box was taken from Norman Petty's studio in Clovis, New Mexico, to California by MCAs Steve Hoffman in 1984 and never returned. MCA had no rights to the tapes and has no knowledge of what happened to them.

== Relationship with Orbison ==
In 1955, Orbison had arranged for Wink Westerners to perform on KMID, a TV station in Midland, Texas. Cecil "Pop" Holifield (1905–1974) also arranged for Johnny Cash to perform on the same program in early 1956. Holifield owned two record stores ("The Record Shop"), one in Odessa and one in Midland. Holifield had also promoted local concerts for Elvis and Cash and arranged TV performances, and regularly contributed articles to Billboard.

Midland, Texas is where Cash first heard The Teen Kings and met Orbison. Orbison attended a concert at Midland High School on the evening of October 12, 1955, starring Elvis Presley and featuring himself, Wanda Jackson, Floyd Cramer, Porter Wagoner, Bobby Lord, Jimmy C. Newman, and Jimmy Day (1934–1999). Billy Walker also performed but was not named in the promotional materials. That afternoon, after a free promotional concert at Midland High School, Cash introduced Orbison to Elvis.

Johnny Cash and Elvis Presley tried to persuade Sam Phillips of Sun Records to give Orbison a contract. When Orbison made a follow-up call to Phillips, Phillips made it clear that no one, not even Johnny Cash, was going to dictate who did and did not get an audition on his record label. After what had happened to the careers of Presley and Cash, artists were coming to Sun in droves. Elvis, Cash, and Orbison had failed to persuade Phillips to sign Orbison.

On the day that Je–Wel released The Teen Kings' single, Orbison took a copy to Cecil "Pop" Holifield (1905–1974). Holifield phoned Sam Phillips and played Ooby Dooby over the phone and told him it was "sellin' big." He promised Phillips that he would never regret auditioning Orbison. A few days later, Phillips phoned Holifield to say that he wanted The Teen Kings in Memphis in three days to record for Sun Records.

The Teen Kings arrived in Memphis on Monday, March 19, 1956. When Phillips was made aware that Orbison was underage when he signed the contract with Je–wel without parental consent on behalf of The Teen Kings, Phillips persuaded Orbison to sign a contract with Sun and Orbison's father co-signed. Phillips also got a court order to prevent Je–wel from selling any more its records of Orbison, although, seemingly, another 5,000 copies were pressed with the assistance of Norman Petty. At this point, Chester Oliver had reach his threshold of tolerance and bowed-out of the partnership with Weldon.

According to "The Authorized Roy Orbison," on March 20, 1956, the Teen Kings re-recorded "Ooby Dooby," "Trying to Get to You", and also recorded "Go Go Go" at Sun. Bob Neal (1917–1983) — owner of Stars, Incorporated, and Elvis Presley's first manager — signed the group to a booking and management contract. By June 1956 The Teen Kings had their first hits on the Sun label, the back-to-back singles "Ooby Dooby" and "Go Go Go." The Teen Kings toured southern venues that included dance halls and drive-in movies theaters, performing on the projection house roofs between film showings. They appeared with Carl Perkins, Johnny Cash, Warren Smith, Sonny Burgess, Faron Young, Johnny Horton, and other country and rockabilly performers.

== Selected discography ==
1. The Teen Kings (JE 101) (1956) Roy Orbison (1936–1988) – vocals, guitar
  Billy Pat Ellis – drums
  Jack Kennelly (1937–2009) – upright bass
  James Emitt Morrow (born 12 Jan 1936 West Point, Arkansas) – electric mandolin (played thru an Echoplex)
  Peanuts Wilson (1935–1980) – rhythm guitar
  Side A: Trying to Get You, by Charles Singleton and Rose Marie McCoy
  Side B: Ooby Dooby, by Wade Moore and Dick Penner
2. Weldon Rogers & Wanda Wolfe (Wanda Faye Wolfe) † Side B: Women Drivers, by Weldon Rogers (JE 103)
3. Rogers Brothers with the Western Melodiers – vocal duet: Weldon Rogers & Willie Rogers (JE 102) Side A: Dim Lights, Thick Smoke (And Loud, Loud Music) (vocal duet: Weldon Rogers & Willie Rogers) 45-JE-102-A
  Side B: For Always; Yes Forever (vocal: Weldon Rogers) 45-JE-102-B
4. Weldon Rogers (JE 103) (1959) Side A: This Song Is Just for You 45-JE-103-A
  Side B: Everybody Wants You (Weldon Rogers & Wanda Wolfe) 45-JE-103-B
5. Weldon Rogers (JE 105) (May 1960) Heaven's Back Door
  Cimarron
6. Weldon Rogers (JE 107) (September 1960) Lying Lips and Cheating Heart
  If I Had One Day to Live

† Wanda Faye Wolfe was married to Weldon Rogers (her second marriage). She signed with Columbia Records in 1964. She was inducted into the Western Swing Society Hall of Fame. (1983)
