= Songs of Jimmie Rodgers =

Studio album by Lefty Frizzell
- Released: October 8, 1951
- Recorded: June 1, 1950 – March 9, 1951
- Genre: Country
- Length: 34:04
- Label: Columbia
- Producer: Don Law

Lefty Frizzell chronology
Songs of Jimmie Rodgers (1951)	Listen to Lefty (1952)

Professional ratings
Review scores
Source	Rating
AllMusic	4.5/5 stars
The Encyclopedia of Popular Music	4/5 stars

Songs of Jimmie Rodgers is the debut album by Lefty Frizzell, released in 1951. It is a tribute album dedicated to the songs of Jimmie Rodgers.

== Content ==
Frizzell recorded the album during his first sessions with Columbia Records. It was produced by Don Law.

== Critical reception ==
No Depression called the album "one of country music’s finest tributes," writing that "the record has no fat; it is an unassuming joy and comfort."

== Track listing ==
Side One
No.	Title	Writer(s)	Length
1.	"Blue Yodel No. 2 (My Lovin' Gal Lucille)"	Jimmie Rodgers	2:30
2.	"Treasures Untold"	Rodgers, Ellworth T. Cozzens	3:19
3.	"My Old Pal"	Rodgers, Elsie McWilliams	2:53
4.	"Brakeman's Blues"	Rodgers	2:55

Side Two
No.	Title	Writer(s)	Length
1.	"Blue Yodel No. 6"	Jimmie Rodgers	3:06
2.	"Travelin' Blues"	Rodgers, Shelly Le Alley	2:56
3.	"Lullaby Yodel"	Rodgers, Elsie McWilliams	2:43
4.	"My Rough and Rowdy Ways"	Rodgers, Elsie McWilliams	2:37
