= Without a Song (album) =

Studio album by Willie Nelson
- Released: 1983
- Recorded: 1983
- Genres: Country, pop, jazz
- Length: 38:53
- Label: Columbia
- Producer: Booker T. Jones

Willie Nelson chronology
Tougher Than Leather (1983)	Without a Song (1983)	Angel Eyes (1984)

Without a Song is a studio album by the American country singer Willie Nelson, released in 1983. Similar to Stardust (1978), it consists of renditions of traditional pop standards. The album was produced by Booker T. Jones.

"As Time Goes By" was nominated for a Grammy Award, in the "Best Country Performance by a Duo or Group with Vocal" category.

== Critical reception ==
Professional ratings
Review scores
Source	Rating
AllMusic	2/5 stars

Rolling Stone noted that "the familiar vocal hesitations and throat-catchings are all in place, but straightforward readings of these mostly less-than-spectacular tunes are tossed off by Nelson with little energy." The New York Times wrote that "Mr. Jones's arrangements, with their simple, plodding rhythms, and guitar and harmonica solos that repeat the tunes, keep the mood appropriately informal... If the music became any barer, however, Mr. Nelson might start sounding like a contemporary Mitch Miller."

== Track listing ==
1. "Without a Song" (Billy Rose, Edward Eliscu, Vincent Youmans) - 3:54
2. "Once in a While" (Bud Green, Michael Edwards) - 4:27
3. "Autumn Leaves" (Johnny Mercer) - 4:04
4. "I Can't Begin to Tell You" (James V. Monaco, Mack Gordon) - 4:03
5. "Harbor Lights" (Hugh Williams, Jimmy Kennedy) - 3:52
6. "Golden Earrings" (Jay Livingston, Ray Evans, Victor Young) - 3:48
7. "You'll Never Know" (Harry Warren, Mack Gordon) - 4:13
8. "To Each His Own" (Jay Livingston, Ray Evans) - 4:09
9. "As Time Goes By" (Herman Hupfeld) - 3:54
10. "A Dreamer's Holiday" (Kim Gannon, Mabel Wayne) - 3:27

== Personnel ==
- Willie Nelson – acoustic guitar, vocals
- Julio Iglesias – vocals on "As Time Goes By"
- Booker T. Jones – organ, arranger
- Bobbie Nelson – piano
- Mickey Raphael – harmonica
- Grady Martin, Jody Payne – guitar
- Bee Spears – bass guitar
- Paul English – drums
- Billy English – percussion
- Jules Chaikin – string and horn conductor

== Chart performance ==
Chart (1983)	Peak position
U.S. Billboard Top Country Albums	3
U.S. Billboard 200	54
Canadian RPM Country Albums	2
Canadian RPM Top Albums	35
