= Walkin' in the Sun =

Studio album by Glen Campbell
- Released: April 17, 1990
- Recorded: 1989–1990
- Studio: Sound Stage and Emerald Studios, Nashville, TN
- Genre: Country
- Label: Capitol
- Producer: Jimmy Bowen, Glen Campbell

Glen Campbell chronology
Favorite Hymns (1989)	Walkin' in the Sun (1990)	Unconditional Love (1991)

Professional ratings
Review scores
Source	Rating
Allmusic	3.5/5 stars

Walkin' in the Sun is the forty-sixth album by American singer/guitarist Glen Campbell, released in 1990 (see 1990 in music). It includes the single "She's Gone Gone Gone", Campbell's last Top 10 hit on the country music charts. The single itself was released via Universal Records, a short-lived label founded by Jimmy Bowen, instead. This album, however, marked his return to Capitol Records.

== Track listing ==
1. "She's Gone, Gone, Gone" (Harlan Howard) – 2:46
2. "You Will Not Lose" (Allen Toussaint) – 2:37 (duet with Steve Wariner)
3. "On a Good Night" (Jim Weatherly, Keith Stegall) – 3:23
4. "If I Could Only Get My Hands on You Now" (Larry Gatlin) – 3:17
5. "Walkin' in the Sun" (Jeff Barry) – 2:27
6. "William Tell Overture" (Gioachino Rossini, arranged by Glen Campbell and Dennis McCarthy) – 2:44
7. "Woodcarver" (Rusty Wolfe) – 3:21 (duet with Lacy J. Dalton)
8. "Cheatin' Is" (Rafe Van Hoy) – 2:16
9. "Tied to the Tracks" (J. Fred Knobloch, Gary Scruggs) – 2:40
10. "Somebody's Leavin'" (Curly Putman, Rafe Van Hoy, Don Cook) – 2:04
11. "Jesus on Your Mind" (Keith Stegall) – 2:39

== Personnel ==
- Glen Campbell – lead vocals, backing vocals, acoustic guitar, electric guitar
- Larrie Londin – drums
- James Stroud – drums
- Reggie Young – electric guitar
- Billy Joe Walker Jr. – acoustic guitar
- Pat Flynn – acoustic guitar
- David Hungate – bass guitar
- Michael Rhodes – bass guitar
- Glen Hardin – piano
- Larry Knechtel – piano
- Mike Lawler – synthesizer
- David Innis – synthesizer
- Mark O'Connor – mandolin, fiddle
- Béla Fleck – banjo
- Conni Ellisor – violin
- John Cowan – additional backing vocals
- Debby Campbell Olson – additional backing vocals
- Gail Davies – additional backing vocals
- Larry Gatlin, Steve Gatlin, Rudy Gatlin, Mark Gray, Alan Jackson, Kathy Mattea, Paul Overstreet, Eddy Raven, Ricky Skaggs, Sharon White, Keith Stegall, Karen Staley, Cheryl White Warren, Buck White, Chris Zann – backing vocals on "Jesus on Your Mind"

Technical

- Jimmy Bowen – producer
- Glen Campbell – producer
- Ron Treat – engineer
- John Guess – engineer, overdubs
- Russ Martin – engineer, overdubs
- Tim Kish – engineer, overdubs
- David Boyer – engineer
- Julian King – engineer
- Bob Bullock – overdubs
- Glenn Meadows/Masterfonics – mastering
- Jessie Nobel – project coordinator
- Virginia Team – art direction
- Jerry Joyner – design
- Beverly Parker – photography

== Charts ==
Singles – Billboard (United States)

Year	Single	Hot Country Singles
1989	"She's Gone, Gone, Gone"	6
1990	"Walkin' in the Sun"	61
