= Dick Penner =

American retired professor of English (born 1936)

Allen Richard Penner (born 1936 in Chicago, Illinois – 24 September 2024) was an American retired professor of English, who, while in college in 1955, co-composed, with Wade Lee Moore, "Ooby Dooby", which was recorded and released by Wade Moore and Rod Barkley. The song was later given away and became a rockabilly hit for Roy Orbison. Penner also had been a singer, guitar player, and recording artist.

In 1956, Penner switched from country music to rock and roll. That same year, he and Wade Moore (born November 15, 1934, in Amarillo, Texas) formed a duo and recorded for Sun Records. The duo was known as "Wade & Dick—The College Kids". Wade & Dick recorded three songs (with guitarist Don Gililland), "Wild Woman", "Don't Need Your Lovin'", and "Bop Bop Baby", which was included on the album Walk the Line, the soundtrack of the eponymous film biography of Johnny Cash. Penner recorded four on his own (with guitarist "Gypsy" Bob Izer). All four songs exhibited a hard, youthful edge that was targeted towards the then new teen market. Penner's four singles — (i) "Move Baby Move", (ii) "Fine Little Baby", Sun 615a, and (iii) "Cindy Lou" and (iv) "Honey Love" Sun 282 consisted of both rockabilly and ballads. The songs did not rise to the popularity of "Ooby Dooby"; which reached a formidable level on the national charts in Orbison's hands and, eventually, became regarded as a classic of the genre.

Moore was in business following his college graduation. After receiving his M.A. from North Texas State, Penner earned a Ph.D. from the University of Colorado. He was a professor of English at the University of Tennessee for 32 years until his retirement in 1990. Penner authored three academic books, his favorite being Fiction of the Absurd.

Dick died on September 24, 2024, of a heart attack suffered on August 23 of that year.

== Compositions ==
By Dick Penner & Wade Moore

- "Ooby Dooby," Allen Richard Penner & Wade Lee Moore (BMI) (written February 1955)
- "Bop Bop Baby," Allen Richard Penner & Wade Lee Moore (BMI)

By Dick Penner

- "Cindy Lou," Allen Richard Penner (BMI) (1957)
- "Your Honey Love," Allen Richard Penner (BMI) (1957)
- "Someday Baby," Allen Richard Penner
- "Don't Need Your Lovin' Baby," Allen Richard Penner (BMI)
- "Move Baby Move," Allen Richard Penner (BMI)
- "Fine Little Baby," Allen Richard Penner (BMI)
- "When Will You Love Me?" (BMI)
- "Wild Woman" (BMI)

== "Ooby Dooby" ==
In 1954, Penner had enrolled at the University of North Texas where he met Wade Moore. They composed "Ooby Dooby" in February 1955. Penner and Wade had taken a six-pack of beer onto the flat roof of their Lambda Chi fraternity house and wrote "Ooby Dooby" in a matter of minutes. Wade Moore later recorded a version of "Ooby Dooby" with Rod Barkley. After the recording of "Ooby Dooby" Rod Barkley quit the music business and moved back to his hometown of Gruver, Texas.

Roy Orbison, then a student at North Texas and friend, became aware of the song and, sometime late in 1955, recorded a demo of it, together with "Hey, Miss Fannie", with his band, the Wink Westerners, at the Jim Beck Studio in Dallas, and sent it to Columbia Records. Columbia was not interested in Orbison, but pitched the song to Sid King and the Five Strings, a band from Denton, Texas, who recorded it on March 5, 1956, in Dallas.

A second recording of "Ooby Dooby" by Orbison took place at Norman Petty Recording Studios in Clovis, New Mexico, and according to the authorised biography of Roy Orbison, this recording was Orbison's first record, released on Je-Wel 101 in March 1956.

On March 20, 1956, a Roy Orbison session was set at Sam Phillips' Sun Studio, 706 Union Avenue, Memphis and "Ooby Dooby" was released yet again on Sun 242. By June 1956, the single had climbed to number 59 on Billboard's Hot 100 and soon thereafter, sold over 250,000 copies.

In 1986, Orbison recorded another version of the song and this version was featured in the 1996 film Star Trek: First Contact as the favorite song on the jukebox of Zefram Cochrane (James Cromwell); played by Cochrane while meeting with the Vulcans who landed on Earth after detecting his first warp flight, the song is the first element of human culture shared with an alien race.

The song has been covered by several other artists, including Creedence Clearwater Revival, on their album Cosmo's Factory.

== Selected discography ==
Wade & Dick – The College Kids

1) Sun Records No. 269 (released May 27, 1957)

"Bop Bop Baby" (BMI U-250)
backed with ("bw") "Don't Need Your Lovin' Baby" (BMI U-251)

2) Sun Records (released 1956)

"Bop Bop Baby" (alternate version) (BMI U-250)
backed with ("bw") "Wild Woman"

Dick Penner

1) Sun Records No. 615 (1957)

"Move Baby Move" (BMI)
backed with ("bw") "Fine Little Baby" (BMI)

2) Sun Records No. 282

"Your Honey Love" (BMI U-278)

"Recordings of "Ooby Dooby"

- Single – Wade Moore & Rod Barkley with the B-side, "When Will You Love Me" (1955)
- Album – Roy Orbison at the Rock House, Sun Records (1961)

Track list includes "Ooby Dooby"

- The Teen Kings (1956)
- Janis Martin (1956)
- Creedence Clearwater Revival (1970)
- Charlie Feathers (1977)
- Elizabeth Mitchell (December 2002)

== Audio samples ==
- Wade and Dick, The College Kids, Bop Bop Baby on YouTube

== Education ==
Penner graduated from Sunset High School (1954) in the North Oak Cliff area of Dallas, Texas. Penner earned a Bachelor of Arts in English (1958) and a master's degree in English (1967) from the University of North Texas. In 1957, while working on his undergraduate degree, Penner was inducted into Blue Key, a national honor fraternity. After earning his master's degree, Penner taught English at North Texas. In the fall of 1961, Penner began teaching English at the University of Colorado at Boulder. He earned his Doctor of Philosophy degree in English from the University of Colorado at Boulder in 1965, whereupon, he became an instructor of English at the University of Tennessee at Knoxville.

== Family ==
First marriage

On June 10, 1961, Penner married Janice Carolyn Gilley in Denton, Texas. Janice was born January 2, 1937, in Dallas, Texas, and died October 26, 2004, in Charlotte, North Carolina.
Dick and Jan have two sons, Richard Lee Penner of Charlotte, NC and Gregory Joseph Penner of Knoxville, Tennessee.

== Academic publications ==
- Allen Richard Penner, PhD, Fielding and Cervantes: The Contribution of "Don Quixote" to "Joseph Andrews" and "Tom Jones" (dissertation) University of Colorado at Boulder (1965)
- Allen Richard Penner, Alan Sillitoe, Twayne Publishers (1972)
- Allen Richard Penner, Fiction of the Absurd; Pratfalls in the Void – a critical anthology, New American Library (1980)
- Allen Richard Penner, Countries of the mind: the fiction of J. M. Coetzee, Greenwood Press (1989)
- Allen Richard Penner, Illuminations Knoxville, Tennessee (2001)
