= Heart Strings (Eddy Arnold song) =

Song by Eddy Arnold
- Released: 1951
- Genre: Country
- Length: 2:43
- Label: RCA Victor
- Songwriter(s): Merle Moore

"Heart Strings" is a country music song written by Merle Moore, sung by Eddy Arnold, and released on the RCA Victor label. In October 1951, it reached No. 5 on the country best seller chart. It spent 12 weeks on the charts and was the No. 22 best selling country record of 1951.

== See also ==
- Billboard Top Country & Western Records of 1951
