= Favorite Hymns =

Studio album by Glen Campbell
- Released: 1989
- Recorded: 1989
- Genres: Traditional gospel, hymns
- Label: Word
- Producers: Glen Campbell, Marty Paich

Glen Campbell chronology
Light Years (1988)	Favorite Hymns (1989)	Walkin' in the Sun (1990)

Favorite Hymns is the forty-fifth album by American singer/guitarist Glen Campbell, released in 1989 (see 1989 in music). In the liner notes, Campbell stated: "This album with the exception of "I See Love" and "Talk Oak Tree", is made up of songs I learned as a child, in a little country church in Billstown, Arkansas. What a great message in these songs. I thank God for the privilege of recording them".

== Track listing ==
1. "Standing on the Promises" (Traditional) – 2:33
2. "What A Friend We Have in Jesus" (Traditional) – 3:08
3. "Softly and Tenderly" (Traditional) – 3:46
4. "Sweet Hour of Prayer" (Traditional) – 3:08
5. "I Surrender All" (Traditional) – 3:13
6. "The Lord's Prayer" (Albert Hay Malotte) – 2:22
7. "Tall Oak Tree" (Dorsey Burnette) – 3:10
8. "Sweet By and By" (Traditional) – 2:48
9. "I See Love" (Micheal Smotherman) – 2:35
10. "Farther Along" (Traditional) – 3:48
11. "In the Garden" (C. Austin Miles) – 3:57
12. "Suddenly There's a Valley" (Chuck Meyer, Biff Jones) – 2:56

== Personnel ==
- Glen Campbell – vocals, lead guitar
- Kim Darigan – bass guitar
- Craig Fall – guitar
- T.J. Kuenster – piano, synthesizer
- Steve Turner – drums

Production

- Glen Campbell – producer
- Marty Paich – producer, string arrangements and conductor
- Tom Knox – rhythm engineer
- Al Schmitt – string/mix engineer
- Randall Martin – illustration
- Tal Howell Design – design
- Terri Short – art direction
