= Something Old, Something New (song) =

Song by Eddy Arnold
- Released: 1951
- Genre: Country
- Length: 2:47
- Label: RCA Victor
- Songwriters: Eddy Arnold, Cy Coben, Charles Grean

"Something Old, Something New" is a country music song written by Eddy Arnold, Cy Coben, and Charles Grean, sung by Arnold, and released on the RCA Victor label. In July 1951, it reached No. 4 on the country juke box chart. It spent nine weeks on the charts and was the No. 22 country juke box record of 1951.

The song's lyrics uses the 19th century "something old, something new" rhyme to describe the singer's heartbreak after his love has left him for another. All that remains of her memory is something old (his love), something new (her new love), something borrowed (his heart), and something blue (the singer).

== See also ==
- Billboard Top Country & Western Records of 1951
