= Poison Love =

Song by Johnnie & Jack
- Released: 1951
- Genre: Country
- Length: 2:13
- Label: RCA Victor
- Songwriter: Mrs. Elmer Laird

"Poison Love" is a country music song written by Tillman Franks and Elmer Laird, but credited to Laird's widow. It was recorded by Johnnie & Jack, and released on the RCA Victor label. In January 1951, it reached No. 4 on the country charts. It spent 17 weeks on the charts and was the No. 16 best selling country record of 1951. Franks helped Laird write the song and pitched it to Eddy Arnold, who declined to record it. His friends Johnnie & Jack recorded it, and it became their first hit. Franks gave the entire copyright to the widow of Elmer Laird, a Shreveport automobile dealer who had once employed him. In 1978 the song became one of the first hits for artist Gail Davies who took the song to number 27 on the Billboard Magazine Hot Country Singles chart.

The song also has been covered by Jerry Lee Lewis, Alison Krauss, Webb Pierce, Ralph Stanley, Bill Monroe, Chet Atkins, Hank Snow, the Osborne Brothers, Emmylou Harris, Mel Tillis, Mac Wiseman, Buddy Miller, Doug Sahm, and T-Bone Burnett.

== See also ==
- List of Billboard Top Country & Western Records of 1951
