= Light Years (Glen Campbell album) =

Studio album by Glen Campbell
- Released: August 1988
- Recorded: 1988, Soundstage Studios, Nashville, TN
- Genre: Country
- Label: MCA
- Producer: Jimmy Bowen; Glen Campbell

Glen Campbell chronology
Still Within the Sound of My Voice (1987)	Light Years (1988)	Favorite Hymns (1989)

Professional ratings
Review scores
Source	Rating
Allmusic	3/5 stars

Light Years is the forty-fourth studio album by American singer-guitarist Glen Campbell, released in 1988 by MCA. The album features eight songs written by Jimmy Webb, including the singles "Light Years" and "More Than Enough".

== Track listing ==
All songs were written by Jimmy Webb, except where indicated.

Side 1

1. "Lightning in a Bottle" – 4:03
2. "If These Walls Could Speak" – 2:58
3. "More Than Enough" – 2:53
4. "Brand New Eyes" – 2:29
5. "Show Me the Way to Go" (Jeff Tweel) – 2:57

Side 2

1. "Light Years" – 3:47
2. "Heart of the Matter" (Michael Smotherman) – 3:01
3. "Almost Alright Again" – 3:27
4. "Saturday Night" – 2:32
5. "Our Movie" – 3:33

== Personnel ==
Music

- Glen Campbell – vocals, acoustic guitar, electric guitar, harmony vocals
- T.J. Kuenster – piano, synthesizer
- Mike Lawler – synthesizer
- Billy Joe Walker Jr. – acoustic guitar
- Reggie Young – electric guitar
- David Hungate – bass
- Russ Kunkel – drums, percussion
- Sandy Campbell Brink – harmony vocals
- Gail Davies – harmony vocals

Production

- Jimmy Bowen – producer
- Glen Campbell – producer
- Russ Martin – engineer
- Marty Williams – engineer
- Mark J. Coddington – engineer
- Chuck Ainlay – engineer
- Willie Pevear – recording at Soundstage Studios, Nashville, TN
- Simon Levy – art direction
- Peter Nash – photography
- Jackson Design – design

== Chart performance ==
=== Album ===
Chart (1988)	Peak position
U.S. Billboard Top Country Albums	58

=== Singles ===
Year	Single	Peak positions
Year	Single	US Country
1988	"Light Years"	35
1989	"More Than Enough"	47
