= Somebody's Been Beating My Time =

Song by Eddy Arnold
- Released: 1951
- Genre: Country
- Length: 2:14
- Label: RCA Victor
- Songwriter(s): Zeke Clements

"Somebody's Been Beating My Time" is a country music song written by Zeke Clements, sung by Eddy Arnold, and released on the RCA Victor label. In October 1951, it reached No. 2 on the country juke box chart. It spent 16 weeks on the charts and was the No. 23 best selling country record of 1951.

== See also ==
- Billboard Top Country & Western Records of 1951
