= There'll Be No Teardrops Tonight =

Compilation album by Willie Nelson
- Released: 1978
- Label: United Artists

Willie Nelson chronology
| To Lefty From Willie (1977) | There'll Be No Teardrops Tonight (1978) | Waylon & Willie (1978) |

There'll Be No Teardrops Tonight is a compilation album by country singer Willie Nelson. The name of the album comes from the Hank Williams song of the same name.

This album is composed mostly of tracks previously issued as singles on Liberty in the early 1960s as well as two previously unissued tracks, "Tomorrow Night" and "Blue Must Be the Color of the Blues".

Professional ratings
Review scores
| Source | Rating |
|---|---|
| Allmusic | 2/5 stars |

== Track listing ==
1. "River Boy" (Fred Carter, Jr.)
2. "I'll Walk Alone" (Sammy Cahn, Jule Styne)
3. "Take Me as I Am (Or Let Me Go)" (Boudleaux Bryant)
4. "Tomorrow Night (You'll Have Another Sweetheart)" (Previously unissued) (Hank Thompson)
5. "Am I Blue?" (Harry Akst, Grant Clarke)
6. "Take My Word" (Willie Nelson)
7. "Home Motel" (Willie Nelson)
8. "Blue Must Be the Color of the Blues" (Previously unissued)
9. "There'll Be No Teardrops Tonight" (Hank Williams)
10. "Feed It a Memory" (Hank Cochran, Justin Tubb)

== Personnel ==
- Willie Nelson – guitar, vocals
