= Lew Williams =

American singer-songwriter (1934–2019)

Lewis Wayne Williams (born Lewis William Kaczmarek, January 12, 1934 – September 1, 2019) was an American rockabilly singer and songwriter, known as the "Cab Calloway of rockabilly".

== Life and career ==
Lewis William Kaczmarek was born in Chillicothe, Texas on January 12, 1934. He began singing at age four, and moved with his family to Dallas at age eleven. He played in local clubs after graduating Adamson High School and entered Midwestern State University in 1952. However, a few months later he secured a job as a headliner for a radio program on Frederick, Oklahoma station KTAT.

The following year, Williams recorded demos at Jim Beck's recording studio and managed to get a single released on Flair Records in June 1953, but "I've Been Doin' Some Slippin' Too" was not a hit, and he did not release further material from these sessions. He sent some of the demos to Imperial Records, who offered him a publishing contract; Williams attempted to secure a recording contract as well but was unsuccessful initially. Imperial finally signed him as a recording artist in 1955, and his first releases came out in 1956. A few singles were issued in 1956 and 1957, with Jimmie Haskell producing and Barney Kessell on guitar; they did not sell and Williams was dropped early in 1957.

Williams graduated from the university in 1957 and devoted himself to songwriting full-time. He wrote material for Jimmy Hughes (with Mae Axton), Ferlin Husky, Floyd Cramer, Porter Wagoner, and Hoyt Johnson. After serving time in the Army, Williams took the pseudonym Vik Wayne for one final release on Dot Records, "The Girl I Saw on Bandstand"; when it did not sell, he opened a recording studio and started a talent agency. He left music for good in the early 1960s, moving into the publishing and mail order businesses.

After Bear Family Records released some of his material in the 1990s, fed by the burgeoning interest in rockabilly in Europe and Japan, he made a comeback, appearing in Las Vegas in 2000 and touring widely thereafter.

Lew Williams died at an assisted living facility in Winnsboro, Texas on September 1, 2019, at the age of 85.

== Discography ==
=== Singles ===
Year	Title	Label
1954	I’ve Been Doin’ Some Slippin’ Too / Please Don’t Tell A Lie About Me	Flair Records
1956	I’ll Play Your Game / Don’t Mention My Name	Imperial Records
1956	Cat Talk / Gone Ape Man	Imperial Records
1956	Bop Bop Ba Doo Bop / Something I Said	Imperial Records
1957	Centipede / Abracadabra	Imperial Records
1958	The Girl I Saw On Bandstand / I Saw You Crying In The Show (als Vik Wayne)	Hamilton Records
	I Cried Over You For The Last Time Last Night; Just For Tonight; What’re We Gonna Do; Cool It Ramon; Little ’Un; Teenager’s Talking On The Phone	not issued
	My New Pink Suedes; All Through The Night; Between Classes; Junior High Doll; Our Love; Over	not issued
	Rock and Roll School; All That I Own; Ba-Ba-Baby; Blue Eyed Blues; I Like The Way; I’m The Manager Of The Flying Purple People Eater	not issued
	Just Anytime; Missin’; Stick Around After School; Teenage Tears; Three Cheers (For My Baby); You’re Not My Baby This Year	not issued

=== Albums ===
- 1999: Cat Talk
- 2000: Teenager’s Talking On The Phone

== Sources ==
- Lew Williams at Allmusic
