= Mom and Dad's Waltz =

1951 song by Lefty Frizzell

Song by Lefty Frizzell
- B-side: "Always Late (With Your Kisses)"
- Released: July 8, 1951
- Genre: Country
- Length: 2:59
- Label: Columbia 20837
- Songwriter(s): Lefty Frizzell

"Mom and Dad's Waltz" is a country music song written and recorded by Lefty Frizzell and released on the Columbia label. In August 1951, it reached No. 2 on the country charts. It spent 29 weeks on the charts and was the No. 9 best selling country record of 1951.

The song has been covered by numerous artists, including Patti Page, Ernest Tubb, Merle Haggard, George Jones, Willie Nelson, The Mom and Dads, and Iris DeMent.

== See also ==
- List of Billboard Top Country & Western Records of 1951
