= City of New Orleans (album) =

Studio album by Willie Nelson
- Released: July 1984
- Studio: Moman's
- Genre: Country
- Length: 37:06
- Label: Columbia
- Producer: Chips Moman

Willie Nelson chronology
Angel Eyes (1984)	City of New Orleans (1984)	Music from Songwriter (1984)

Singles from City of New Orleans
- 1. "City of New Orleans" Released: July 30, 1984

City of New Orleans is a studio album by the American musician Willie Nelson, released by Columbia Records in 1984. With the exception of the Nelson penned "Why Are You Pickin' on Me", it is a cover album.

The title track was written and originally recorded by Steve Goodman; his version was released in 1971. The next year, Arlo Guthrie became the first to have a hit with the song. Nelson's version topped the U.S. country singles chart and received two Grammy nominations.

== Critical reception ==
Professional ratings
Review scores
Source	Rating
AllMusic	2/5 stars
The Philadelphia Inquirer	2/5 stars
The Rolling Stone Album Guide	2/5 stars

The Philadelphia Inquirer wrote that Nelson's "pushing his all-purpose interpretive powers too far." Saw Tek Meng of the New Straits Times cited that the title track was an excellent opener, while also praising "Good Time Charlie's Got the Blues" as a standout with sensitive singing. Jerry Spangler of the Deseret News found Nelson's version of "Good Time Charlie's Got the Blues" laughable.

Nelson performed "City of New Orleans" at the 27th Annual Grammy Awards, as it received two nominations. It won Best Country Song for Goodman, but lost Best Country Vocal Performance, Male to Merle Haggard's "That's the Way Love Goes".

== Track listing ==
No.	Title	Writer(s)	Original artist	Length
1.	"City of New Orleans"	Steve Goodman	Steve Goodman	4:47
2.	"Just Out of Reach"	Virgil "Pappy" Stewart	The Stewart Family	3:37
3.	"Good Time Charlie's Got the Blues"	Danny O'Keefe	Danny O'Keefe	2:52
4.	"Why Are You Pickin' on Me"	Willie Nelson		2:26
5.	"She's Out of My Life"	Tom Bahler	Michael Jackson	3:26

Side B
No.	Title	Writer(s)	Original artist	Length
6.	"Cry"	Churchill Kohlman	Ruth Casey	3:32
7.	"Please Come to Boston"	Dave Loggins	Dave Loggins	4:17
8.	"It Turns Me Inside Out"	Jan Crutchfield	Conway Twitty	3:27
9.	"Wind Beneath My Wings"	Larry Henley, Jeff Silbar	Kamahl	3:46
10.	"Until It's Time for You to Go"	Buffy Sainte-Marie	Buffy Sainte-Marie	4:06
Total length:				37:06

== Personnel ==
- Willie Nelson – vocals, guitar
- Reggie Young, J.R. Cobb, Chips Moman – guitar
- Mike Leech – bass guitar
- Bobby Emmons, Bobby Wood – keyboards
- Gene Chrisman – drums
- Mickey Raphael – harmonica
- Wayne Jackson – trumpet
- Donald Sanders – baritone saxophone
- Jon Marett – alto saxophone
- Toni Wine, Rick Yancey, Andy Black, Sherill Parks, Bobby Wood, J.R. Cobb, Chips Moman – backing vocals
- The A Strings – strings

== Charts ==
=== Weekly charts ===
Chart (1984)	Peak position
Canadian Country Albums (RPM)	24
Canadian Albums (RPM)	62
US Billboard 200	69
US Top Country Albums (Billboard)	1

=== Year-end charts ===
Chart (1984)	Position
US Top Country Albums (Billboard)	32
Chart (1985)	Position
US Top Country Albums (Billboard)	22

== Certifications ==
Region	Certification	Certified units/sales
Canada (Music Canada)	Gold	50,000^{^}
United States (RIAA)	Platinum	1,000,000^{^}
^{^} Shipments figures based on certification alone.
