= Imperial Records =

American record company founded in 1947

- Parent company: Liberty Records (1963–1970); United Artists Records (1970–1979); Thorn EMI (1979–1996); EMI (1996–2012); Universal Music Group (2012–present)
- Founded: 1947
- Founder: Lew Chudd
- Distributor: Republic Records
- Genre: Various (historic), urban (later)
- Country of origin: U.S.
- Location: Hollywood, California
- Official website: imperialmusic.com

Imperial Records is an American record company and label started in 1947 by Lew Chudd. The label was reactivated in 2006 by EMI, which owned the label and back catalogue at the time. Imperial is owned by Universal Music Group.

== Early years to 1979 ==
When Imperial was founded in 1947, it concentrated on rhythm and blues (R&B) and country music: Fats Domino, Frankie Ford, Ricky Nelson, and Slim Whitman. In the UK, Imperial was distributed by London Records.

During the 1950s and 1960s, Imperial released jazz albums by Sonny Criss, Charlie Mariano, Papa Celestin, Erskine Hawkins, and Harold Land.

Imperial bought Aladdin in 1961 and Minit Records in 1963, having distributed Minit since 1960. During the 1950s, Imperial was one of the primary labels issuing a vast quantity of R&B from New Orleans through their involvement with producer and writer Dave Bartholomew and in the 1960s with their distribution (and purchase, a few years later) of Minit.

In 1963, after Imperial lost Fats Domino and Ricky Nelson to rival record companies ABC Records and Decca Records, respectively, Chudd sold the label to Liberty Records.

Under Liberty's management, the label enjoyed success with Irma Thomas, Johnny Rivers, Jackie DeShannon, Classics IV, and Cher. During the British Invasion, Liberty (whose recordings were distributed by EMI in the UK) licensed the Hollies, Billy J. Kramer, the Dakotas, and the Swinging Blue Jeans from EMI. Recordings by the Bonzo Dog Band and Kim Fowley were issued in the U.S. by Imperial.

By 1970, the label had become part of Liberty's merger with United Artists Records but was phased out shortly after, with its roster transferred to United Artists. EMI acquired the Imperial Records catalogue with its acquisition of UA Records in 1979.

== 1990s to present ==
Throughout the 1990s, EMI released CD compilations of Imperial artists that featured the original Imperial labels.

In June 2006, EMI re-activated the Imperial Records imprint and announced that it would be the urban music division of Caroline Distribution, part of Virgin Records, spearheaded by the urban music veteran Neil Levine. The first signing to the imprint was Raptivism Records. Fat Joe signed with Virgin Records and Imperial Records. Imperial provided resources for developing urban artists with EMI's major labels, including Capitol Records and Virgin Records, which were merged into the Capitol Music Group in January 2007. Universal Music Group acquired the Capitol Music Group as part of its acquisition of the majority of EMI's recorded music operations in 2012. After a few releases, Imperial became dormant again.

In 2021, the Republic Records unit of Universal Music Group revived the Imperial name with the formation of Imperial Music.

In February 2026, the account name of the instagram page of Imperial Music was changed to Universal Records.

== Label variations ==
- Early 1950s to 1954: Blue label with "IMPERIAL" in script letters at the top; 78-RPM counterparts have red labels)
- 1954–1955: Red label with "IMPERIAL" in script (also silver block) letters at the top
- 1955–1957: Maroon label with "IMPERIAL" in silver block letters at the top
- 1957–1963: Black label with colored rays and "IMPERIAL" in white block letters at the top; stereo album counterparts have black labels with silver lettering
- 1964–1966: Black, white and magenta label with I-R logo in a black box on the left side, "IMPERIAL" under the logo, and "A SUBSIDIARY OF LIBERTY RECORDS" at the bottom
- 1966–1969: Black and lime green label with I-R logo in a red box on the left side, "IMPERIAL" under the logo, "A PRODUCT OF LIBERTY RECORDS" under "IMPERIAL" and "A DIVISION OF LIBERTY RECORDS"
- 1970: Black and lime green label with I-R logo in a red box on the left side, "IMPERIAL" (in slightly larger letters than the previous label) under the logo, and "LIBERTY/UA, INC"

== Imperial Records artists (1947–1970) ==
- Doris Akers (1953) (IM-694)
- Jeff Alexander
- Zane Ashton (Bill Aken)
- Ross Bagdasarian Sr.
- Dave Bartholomew
- Lee Bedford, Jr.
- Elmer Bernstein
- Joe Bill (DeAngelo)
- The Bonzo Dog Band
- James Booker
- Billy Briggs
- Mel Carter
- Papa Celestin
- Paul Chambers
- Cher
- Petula Clark
- Classics IV
- Clay Cole
- Albert Collins
- Kenneth Copeland
- Sugar Boy Crawford
- Sonny Criss
- Sonny Curtis
- Wild Bill Davis
- Dave Dee, Dozy, Beaky, Mick & Tich
- Jackie DeShannon
- Fats Domino
- Dukes of Dixieland
- Georgie Fame
- The Fantastic Baggys
- Freddy Fender
- The Fender IV
- Ralph Flanagan
- Frankie Ford
- Pete Fountain
- Kim Fowley
- Ernie Freeman
- George Girard
- Bob Harrington
- Peppermint Harris
- Ray Harrison Orchestra
- Duke Henderson
- Adolph Hofner
- The Hollies
- The Irresistibles
- Betty Kay
- Billy J. Kramer & the Dakotas
- Smiley Lewis
- George Liberace
- Bob Luman
- Harley Luse and His Orchestra
- The Majors
- Wingy Manone
- Warne Marsh
- Reginald G. Marshall
- Punch Miller
- Garnet Mimms
- The Misfits
- Bill Mooney and his Cactus Twisters
- Carl Myles
- Ozzie Nelson
- Ricky Nelson
- Sandy Nelson
- The O'Jays
- Don Ralke
- Bo Rhambo
- Johnny Rivers
- Weldon Rogers
- Leonard Rosenman
- Santo & Johnny
- Sheriff John
- Dorothy Simmons (1953) (IM-693)
- Huey "Piano" Smith
- Johnny Spencer & the Kona Koasters (1959) (LP-9076)
- The Spiders
- April Stevens
- The Sunshine Company
- The Swinging Blue Jeans
- The Teddy Bears
- Irma Thomas
- Al Toft and His Orchestra
- T-Bone Walker
- Slim Whitman
- Tim Whitsett
- Lester Williams
- Lew Williams
- Warren Zevon

== Later artists ==
- Fat Joe
- MC Jin
- Rasheeda
- Julian Park
- The Score
