= Angel Eyes (Willie Nelson album) =

Studio album by Willie Nelson
- Released: 1984
- Studio: Pedernales Recording (Spicewood, Texas)
- Genre: Pop
- Label: Columbia
- Producer: Willie Nelson

Willie Nelson chronology
Without a Song (1983)	Angel Eyes (1984)	City of New Orleans (1984)

Angel Eyes is a studio album by the American musician Willie Nelson, released in 1984. Ray Charles dueted on the title track. The album peaked at No. 116 on the Billboard 200.

== Critical reception ==
Professional ratings
Review scores
Source	Rating
AllMusic	1.5/5 stars
The Rolling Stone Album Guide	2/5 stars

The Daily Breeze noted that "the album could have been recorded in any cocktail lounge between [California] and Austin, complete with tinkling piano, blue notes and straight shot of bourbon lyrics."

== Track listing ==
1. "Angel Eyes" (Earl Brent, Matt Dennis)
2. "Tumbling Tumbleweeds" (Bob Nolan)
3. "I Fall in Love Too Easily" (Jule Styne, Sammy Cahn)
4. "Thank You"
5. "My Window Faces the South" (Jerry Livingston, Mitchell Parish, Abner Silver)
6. "Gypsy" (Billy Reid)
7. "There Will Never Be Another You" (Mack Gordon, Harry Warren)
8. "Samba for Charlie"

== Personnel ==
- Willie Nelson - guitar, vocals
- Ray Charles - guest vocals on "Angel Eyes"
- Jackie King - guitar
- Jon Blondell - bass
- Don Hass - keyboards, Prophet 5, Jupiter 8, obx a, Emulator II
- Bob Scott - drums, percussion

Technical

- Bobby Arnold, Larry Greenhill - engineer
- Denny Purcell - mastering
- Willie Nelson - producer
