= Always Late with Your Kisses =

"Always Late (with Your Kisses)"

Single by Lefty Frizzell

from the album Listen to Lefty
- B-side: "Mom and Dad's Waltz"
- Released: July 8, 1951
- Recorded: May 24, 1951
- Studio: Jim Beck Studio, Dallas, Texas
- Genre: Country
- Length: 3:10
- Label: Columbia 20837
- Songwriters: Lefty Frizzell, Blackie Crawford
- Producer: Don Law

Lefty Frizzell singles chronology
"I Want to Be With You Always" (1951)	"Always Late (with Your Kisses)" (1951)	"Travellin' Blues" (1951)

"Always Late (with Your Kisses)" is a song co-written and recorded by American country music artist Lefty Frizzell. It was the fifth single released from his 1951/1952 album Listen to Lefty. It peaked at number one in 1951 and became his fourth release to hit the top.

== Recording and composition ==
During early 1951, Lefty Frizzell was enjoying the success followed by his hit debut, "If You've Got the Money (I've Got the Time)". By this time, Frizzell and Hank Williams were the biggest names in country music. Frizzell met for another session on May 24, which capped off a single. "Always Late (With Your Kisses)" with the B-side "Mom and Dad's Waltz" was released in July and in August the single rose to the number one slot on the US Country chart.

"Mom and Dad's Waltz" peaked at number two for eight weeks on the country chart. The song has been covered by many different artists, most credibly, long-time Lefty Frizzell friend, George Jones, who was influenced by Frizzell. He covered the song in 1973 on his album, Nothing Ever Hurt Me (Half As Bad as Losing You).

== Chart performance ==
Chart (1951)	Peak position
US Hot Country Songs (Billboard)	1

== Cover version ==
In addition to Frizzell's own stereo re-recording of "Always Late" in 1959, many artists have recorded cover versions of the song, including:

George Jones version

George Jones covered the song for his 1973 album: Nothing Ever Hurt Me

Jo-El Sonnier version

Jo-El Sonnier covered the song in 1976. His version reached No. 99 on the U.S. country chart.

Merle Haggard version

Merle Haggard covered the song in 2001 on his album Roots, Volume 1.

Leona Williams version

A version by Leona Williams charted in 1981, reaching No. 84 on the same chart.

== Dwight Yoakam version ==
"Always Late with Your Kisses"

Single by Dwight Yoakam

from the album Hillbilly Deluxe
- B-side: "1000 Miles"
- Released: February 1988
- Recorded: 1987
- Genre: Country
- Length: 2:10
- Label: Reprise 27994
- Songwriters: Lefty Frizzell, Blackie Crawford
- Producer: Pete Anderson

Dwight Yoakam singles chronology
"Please, Please Baby" (1987)	"Always Late with Your Kisses" (1988)	"Streets of Bakersfield" (1988)

"Always Late with Your Kisses" was covered by country music artist Dwight Yoakam. It is the fourth and final single released from his 1987 album Hillbilly Deluxe. It peaked at No. 9 in the United States, and No. 5 in Canada.

== Chart performance ==
Chart (1988)	Peak position
US Hot Country Songs (Billboard)	9
Canadian RPM Country Tracks	5

Music video

The music video was directed by Sherman Halsey.
