= Sid King =

- Birth name: Sidney Erwin
- Born: October 15, 1936 (age 88); Denton, Texas, United States
- Genres: Rockabilly
- Occupation(s): Singer, guitarist
- Instrument(s): Guitar, vocals
- Years active: c.1950 – 1965
- Labels: Starday, Columbia

Sidney Erwin (born October 15, 1936), known by his stage name Sid King, is an American rockabilly singer and guitarist who recorded in the 1950s as the leader of Sid King and the Five Strings.

== Life and career ==
He was born in Denton, Texas, and grew up in the Dallas-Fort Worth area. As a singer and guitar player, he formed a band in 1952 with his friend Melvin Robinson, who played steel guitar and saxophone, and soon added his brother Billy Erwin (aka Billy King, 1938 – 2019) on lead guitar, with Ken Massey on bass and David White on drums. The band became known as the Western Melody Makers, played many local gigs in the North Texas area, and appeared on local radio and television in the early 1950s performing country music and Western swing. They recorded with producer Jim Beck for Starday Records but their early singles, including "Who Put the Turtle in Myrtle’s Girdle" in 1953, were unsuccessful.

By 1954, the band's repertoire had continued to expand to take on board rhythm and blues influences and songs, in a style the singer later termed "hillbilly bebop". They met producer Don Law, and signed to Columbia Records, with Erwin taking the stage name of Sid King and his band becoming the Five Strings. Billed as "the youngest band in the land", the group recorded nine singles for Columbia between 1955 and 1957, including "Good Rockin' Baby" and "Gonna Shake This Shack Tonight" (both written by King), and early versions of "Blue Suede Shoes" and "Ooby Dooby". They toured widely, performed on the Louisiana Hayride and Grand Ole Opry radio shows, and shared bills with emerging stars including Elvis Presley, Buddy Holly, Johnny Cash, and Roy Orbison. Music historian Craig Morrison described the records as "a restrained and controlled rockabilly, with a certain hillbilly charm". However, the recordings met with little success. The band were dropped by the record label in 1957, and split up the following year. King later said, "I think we were too rock for country and too country for rock".

The Erwin brothers continued to perform together locally, and toured with artists including Buddy Knox and Sonny James. Sid King also recorded briefly and unsuccessfully for Dot Records. In 1965, he set up a barbershop in Richardson, Texas, while his brother Billy became a sound engineer in Los Angeles before returning to work in the shop in the mid-1970s. A few years later, with renewed interest in original and revivalist rockabilly music, the original members of the group reunited and in 1982 recorded an album, Let's Get Loose, released in the Netherlands in 1987. Sid King and his brother, with a band, performed at rock and roll festivals, and made several trips to Europe, including a show at the 2008 Hemsby Rock'n'Roll Weekender. King released another album, From One Cut To Another in 2016.

King's recordings for Columbia were reissued by the Bear Family label as Gonna Shake This Shack Tonight.
