= She's Gone, Gone, Gone =

1965 song by Harlan Howard

"She's Gone Gone Gone"
- Dutch release picture sleeve

Single by Lefty Frizzell

from the album The Sad Side of Love
- B-side: "Confused"
- Released: May 1, 1965
- Genre: Country
- Length: 2:20
- Label: Columbia
- Songwriter: Harlan Howard
- Producer: Don Law

Lefty Frizzell singles chronology
"Gator Hollow" (1965)	"She's Gone Gone Gone" (1965)	"A Little Unfair" (1965)

"She's Gone Gone Gone" is a country music song written by Harlan Howard and originally recorded by American singer Lefty Frizzell. Frizzell's version of the song reached number 12 on the Billboard Hot Country Singles & Tracks chart.

== Critical reception ==
An uncredited review in Billboard said that the song has a "catchy rhythm but sad lyric" and that Frizzell "performs in his top fashion".

== Chart performance ==
Chart (1965)	Peak position
US Hot Country Songs (Billboard)	12

== Carl Jackson version ==
"She's Gone, Gone, Gone"

Single by Carl Jackson
- B-side: "You Made a Memory of Me"
- Released: November 3, 1984
- Genre: Country
- Length: 2:57
- Label: Columbia
- Songwriter: Harlan Howard
- Producer: Stan Cornelius

Carl Jackson singles chronology
"She's Gone, Gone, Gone" (1984)	"All That's Left for Me" (1985)

In 1984, Carl Jackson covered the song. His version, released as his debut single for Columbia Records, peaked at number 44 on the same chart.

=== Chart performance ===
Chart (1984)	Peak position
US Hot Country Songs (Billboard)	44

== Glen Campbell version ==
"She's Gone, Gone, Gone"

Single by Glen Campbell

from the album Walkin' in the Sun
- B-side: "William Tell Overture"
- Released: September 30, 1989
- Genre: Country
- Length: 2:48
- Label: Universal, Capitol
- Songwriter: Harlan Howard
- Producers: Jimmy Bowen; Glen Campbell

Glen Campbell singles chronology
"More Than Enough" (1989)	"She's Gone, Gone, Gone" (1989)	"Walkin' in the Sun" (1990)

"She's Gone, Gone, Gone" was recorded by American country music artist Glen Campbell. It was released in September 1989 as the first single from the album Walkin' in the Sun. The song reached number 6 on the Billboard Hot Country Singles & Tracks chart. Campbell's version was his last top 10 hit on this chart, and his only release for Jimmy Bowen's short-lived Universal label. The album was released via Capitol Records.

=== Chart performance ===
Chart (1989)	Peak position
Canada Country Singles (RPM)	24
US Hot Country Songs (Billboard)	6
