= Look What Thoughts Will Do =

Song by Lefty Frizzell
- Released: 1951
- Genre: Country
- Length: 2:29
- Label: Columbia
- Songwriter(s): Lefty Frizzell, Dub Dickerson

"Look What Thoughts Will Do" is a country music song written Lefty Frizzell and Dub Dickerson, sung by Frizzell, and released on the Columbia label. In March 1951, it reached No. 4 on the country jockey chart. It spent 12 weeks on the charts and was the No. 26 best selling country record of 1951.

The song was later covered by other artists, including Willie Nelson and Merle Haggard.

== See also ==
- List of Billboard Top Country & Western Records of 1951
