= I Want to Be with You Always =

Single by Lefty Frizzell

from the album Listen to Lefty
- B-side: "My Baby's Just Like Money"
- Released: March 19, 1951
- Recorded: January 11, 1951
- Studio: Jim Beck Studio, Dallas, Texas
- Genre: Country
- Length: 3:00
- Label: Columbia
- Songwriters: Lefty Frizzell, Jim Beck
- Producer: Don Law

Lefty Frizzell singles chronology
"Shine, Shave, Shower (It's Saturday)" (1950)	"I Want to Be with You Always" (1951)	"I Love You a Thousand Ways" (1951)

"I Want to Be with You Always" was the country music song released by Lefty Frizzell in March 1951. The song was Frizzell's third number one US Country hit since "If You've Got the Money (I've Got the Time)" one year earlier.

== Recording and composition ==
The song was written by Lefty Frizzell and his producer, Jim Beck. The two had also penned the "If You've Got the Money I've Got the Time". The song was recorded on January 11, and released on March 19, 1951.

Personnel

- Lefty Frizzell
- Jimmy Rollins
- Joe Knight
- C.B. White
- Bill Callahan
- Eddie Caldwell
- Chubby Crank
- Madge Sutee

== Success ==
The song was Lefty Frizzell's first number one on the Country & Western Best Seller charts where it spent six weeks at number one and a total of twenty-seven weeks on the chart.
