= If You've Got the Money I've Got the Time =

"If You've Got the Money (I've Got the Time)"

Single by Lefty Frizzell

from the album Listen to Lefty
- A-side: "I Love You a Thousand Ways"
- Released: September 14, 1950
- Recorded: July 25, 1950
- Studio: Jim Beck Studio, Dallas, Texas
- Genre: Country, honky-tonk
- Length: 2:58
- Label: Columbia
- Songwriters: Lefty Frizzell, Jim Beck
- Producers: Art Satherley, Don Law

Lefty Frizzell singles chronology
"I Love You a Thousand Ways" (1950)	"If You've Got the Money (I've Got the Time)" (1950)	"Look What Thoughts Will Do" (1951)

"If You've Got the Money (I've Got the Time)" is a debut song co-written and recorded by American country music artist Lefty Frizzell, released on September 14, 1950. The song is the second song recorded by Lefty Frizzell during his first session with Columbia Records in July 1950. The song rose to number one.

== Recording and composition ==
During a show there, Jim Beck, owner of a local recording studio, was starting to take notice of Frizzell. Beck had deals with several major record producing labels and maintained connections with the many publishers. Impressed with Frizzell's performance, he invited him to make a free demo at the studio. In April 1950, he cut several demos of Frizzell singing his own songs, including "If You've Got the Money (I've Got the Time)", which Beck took to Nashville where he pitched it to Little Jimmy Dickens, who disliked the song. However, Columbia Records producer Don Law heard the cut and liked it. After hearing Frizzell in concert, he signed the singer and recorded him for the first time.

The first session was held on July 25, 1950, in the Jim Beck Studio in Dallas, Texas. There he recorded four songs, the first: "I Love You a Thousand Ways", which was written by Frizzell as a letter to his newly wed wife, when he was jailed in 1947 for having sex with an underage girl. The next cut was "If You've Got the Money", a honky-tonk tune written by Frizzell and Frizzell's then manager and studio owner, Jim Beck. The songs were released together as a double-sided single on September 14, 1950.

Personnel

- Lefty Frizzell
- Norman Stevens
- Jimmie Curtis
- Bobby Williamson
- Pee Wee Stewart
- Madge Sutee

== Success ==
The single stayed at number one for three weeks on the Most Played C&W Jukebox Records and peaked at number two on the C&W Best Seller list. The Frizzell recording spent 22 weeks on the country chart.

== Cover versions ==
- In 1950, Dusty Fletcher on a 78 from National, 9142.
- In 1950, Jo Stafford on a 78 from Columbia Records, with Paul Weston and His Orchestra.
- In 1950, June Hutton recorded a version with the Lee Gordon Singers (Decca 27329).
- In 1958, Carl Butler recorded and released a version the song as an A-Side on Columbia Records (N.Y.) 41119.
- In 1961, George Jones on his album Sings Country & Western Hits.
- In 1961, Agnes and Orville who are actually June Stearns and Lefty
- In 1971, Mose Allison recorded a version on his album, Western Man.
- In 1976, Gary Stewart recorded it to his album, Steppin' Out.
- In 1976, Willie Nelson took his version to number one on the country chart, where it was his second solo release to reach the top slot.
- In 1980, Los Felinos released an English/Spanish version of said song under the title "Si tu tienes la plata".
- In 2001, Merle Haggard recorded a version on his album, Roots, Volume 1.
- In 2012, it appeared on The Little Willies album, For the Good Times.
- other versions are by Jess Willard, Wayne Raney, JImmy Owen, Ernie Lee. Kenny Roberts, Texas Jim Robertson, John Talley, Mervin Shiner And Bob Sandy. Others are out there too.
