= Jim Beck (music producer) =

American recording studio owner (1916–1956)

- Born: James Albert Beck; August 11, 1916; Marshall, Texas, U.S.
- Died: May 3, 1956 (aged 39); Dallas, Texas, U.S.
- Occupation(s): Record producer, publishing company executive, talent scout
- Years active: Late 1920s – 1956
- Known for: Jim Beck Studio

James Albert Beck (August 11, 1916 – May 3, 1956) was an American country music talent agent, record promoter, recording studio owner, A&R engineer, record producer, and music publisher from Dallas, Texas, best known for discovering and being the first to record Lefty Frizzell.

Beck operated the Jim Beck Studio in Dallas. Artists recording at the Jim Beck Studio included George Jones, Ray Price, Floyd Tillman, and Marty Robbins.

== Early life ==
Beck was born in Marshall, Texas on August 11, 1916. His father was Albert Demastor Beck, a grain merchant, and his mother was Lorine Young McClanahan Beck, a housekeeper. He had two younger sisters. His family relocated to Fort Worth by 1930, where Beck later worked in radio sales. Beck joined the United States Army during World War II and served as a radio engineer until 1945. After his military service, he settled in Dallas, Texas.

== Career ==
In Dallas, Beck built his first recording studio on Main Street, recording public service announcements for the Army. He worked as a DJ for Dallas radio station KRLD, working on the Big D Jamboree and occasional host for the Louisiana Hayride live country music programs as he began to establish himself as a recording engineer.

=== Jim Beck Studio ===
In 1950 Beck built a second recording studio at 1101 Ross Avenue in Dallas.

Beck is credited with discovering and, in 1950, being the first to record Lefty Frizzell. He is also credited for introducing Frizzell and Ray Price to Frank Jones of Columbia Records, which led to their first major recording contracts.

In 1952 Marty Robbins recorded his first hit — "I'll Go On Alone" — at Beck's studio. Carl Smith also recorded a few hits there. Between 1954 and 1956, Frankie Miller recorded a series of singles for Columbia at Beck's studio.

Record labels and producers who recorded at Jim Beck Studios included Decca (via Paul Cohen), Bullet, King, Imperial (via Lew Chudd), and Columbia Records (via Don Law).

Norman Petty, who later built and ran his own recording studio in Clovis, New Mexico, worked as a part-time recording engineer at the Jim Beck Studio. Jimmy Rollins also worked at Beck's studio in the mid-1950s.

== Death ==
Jim Beck died on May 3, 1956, at Baylor Hospital, after collapsing at his recording studio from accidentally inhaling carbon tetrachloride fumes while he and his assistant Jimmy Rollins were cleaning recording equipment.

== Jim Beck Studio recording artists and session musicians ==
- Charline Arthur
- Lee Bell
- Mac Curtis
- Lefty Frizzell
- Johnny Gimble
- Rudy Grayzell (aka Rudy Gray; né Rudolph Paiz Jimenez)
- Buck Griffin
- Jimmy Heap (né James Arthur Heap)
- Gene Henslee (de)
- Johnny Hicks (né John Kenneth Hicks)
- George Jones (1931–2013)
- Neal Jones (Neal Gordan "Tywhop" Jones)
- Merle Kilgore
- Sid King and the Five Strings (né Albert Sidney Erwin)
- Maddox Brothers and Rose
- Frankie Miller
- Willie Nelson
- Hoyle Nix
- Roy Orbison
- Leon Payne
- Webb Pierce
- Ray Price
- Jim Reeves
- Leon Rhodes
- Marty Robbins
- Carl Smith
- Hank Thompson
- Floyd Tillman
- Billy Walker
- Lew Williams
