= Lefty Frizzell =

American country singer-songwriter (1928–1975)

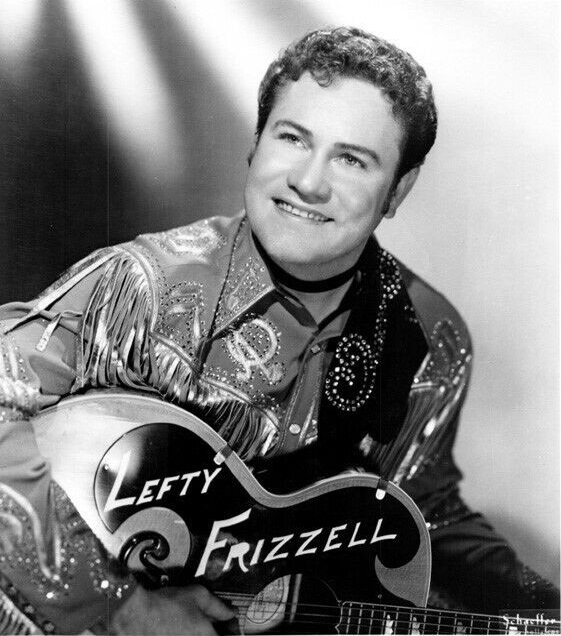
- Frizzell in 1957

Background information
- Also known as: Lefty Frizzell
- Born: William Orville Frizzell; March 31, 1928; Corsicana, Texas, U.S.
- Origin: El Dorado, Arkansas, U.S.
- Died: July 19, 1975 (aged 47) Nashville, Tennessee, U.S.
- Genres: Country; Western; honky-tonk; folk; blues
- Occupation: Singer-songwriter
- Instruments: Acoustic guitar; vocals
- Years active: 1942–1975
- Labels: Columbia; ABC

William Orville "Lefty" Frizzell (March 31, 1928 – July 19, 1975) was an American country and honky-tonk singer-songwriter.

Frizzell is known as one of the most influential country music vocal stylists of all time. He has been cited as influencing prominent country singers such as George Jones, Merle Haggard, Roy Orbison, and Willie Nelson. He was inducted into the Country Music Hall of Fame in 1982, as well as the Songwriters Hall of Fame. In his prime, Frizzell was the first artist to achieve four songs in the top 10 on the Billboard Country Music charts at one time. Frizzell went on to have more success, releasing many songs that charted in the top 10 of the Hot Country Songs charts as an artist and songwriter. After dealing with alcoholism, he died of a stroke at age 47.

== Early life ==
William Orville Frizzell was born the son of an oilman, the first of eight children, in Corsicana in Navarro County in North Texas, United States. During his childhood, his family moved to El Dorado in Union County in south Arkansas.

As a child, he was called "Sonny", but he later took the name "Lefty". He is believed to have gotten the name "Lefty" because he had won a neighborhood fight, but this tale was probably fabricated as part of a publicity stunt set up by his record label.

Frizzell's largest influences included "The Blue Yodeler" Jimmie Rodgers. He began listening to Rodgers' records as a boy. He began singing professionally before his teens, even earning a spot on the local radio station KELD in El Dorado. Frizzell's teens were spent singing in nightclubs and radio and talent shows throughout the south. During his tour of Arkansas, Texas, New Mexico, and Las Vegas, he began to develop a style of his own, shaped by artists including Rodgers, Ernest Tubb, and Ted Daffan.

== Musical beginnings and jail ==
While living in Greenville, Texas, during World War II, Frizzell performed on radio station KPLT in nearby Paris, Texas. There, he met Alice Harper; they married in March 1945. In 1946, they moved to Roswell, New Mexico, and Frizzell performed on radio station KGFL and with the house band at the Cactus Gardens dance hall.

In July 1947, the 19-year-old Frizzell was arrested and jailed for having sex with an underage fan. He was charged with statutory rape, convicted the following month, and served six months in the county jail. Filled with guilt, he wrote poems to his wife from his cell; one of them became his first big record.

After his release in late 1949, he was led away from music, and back to the oil fields to work with his father. He soon was performing in nightclubs again. By 1950, he had landed a regular job at the Big Spring, Texas, nightclub "Ace of Clubs" where he developed a dedicated fan following.

== Recording career ==
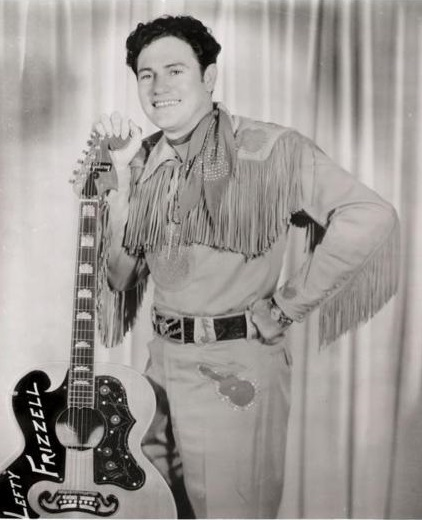
Frizzell in 1951

During a show at the "Ace of Clubs", Jim Beck, the owner of a Dallas recording studio, took notice of Frizzell. Beck had deals with several major record producing labels and maintained connections with many publishers. Impressed with Frizzell's performance, he invited him to make a free demo at the studio. In April 1950, he cut several demos of Frizzell singing his own songs, including "If You've Got the Money (I've Got the Time)," which Beck took to Nashville where he pitched it to Little Jimmy Dickens, who disliked the song. However, Columbia Records producer Don Law heard the cut and liked it. After hearing Lefty in concert, he signed the singer and recorded him for the first time.

"If You've Got the Money (I've Got the Time)" became a two-sided smash hit in 1950 upon its release; the B-side was the song Frizzell wrote to his grief-stricken wife Alice from jail, "I Love You a Thousand Ways." These songs launched him into stardom and within two years, he had gone on to register 13 top-10 country hits.

By 1951, he had perfected his vocal style and refined his guitar skills. He began working with a core group of Dallas-based studio musicians, including pianist Madge Suttee. In January 1951, he signed a contract that designated Jack Starnes Jr. as his manager. That contract conflicted with another contract Frizzell had signed, leading Starnes to file a major lawsuit against Frizzell, which was settled out of court a year later. Also in early 1951, Frizzell formed the Western Cherokees, led by Blackie Crawford, and soon they became his primary band for both live and recording sessions. During this stage of his career, he was in the studio extensively, recording singles. His third single, "I Want to Be With You Always", was number one for 11 weeks in 1951.

By mid-1951, Frizzell had become one of the only country singers who could be considered to match the popularity of Hank Williams, and he even toured with Williams. "There is enough stories in that tour to fill a book..." Frizzell once said, although he never told those stories. He had three more top-10 hits in 1951: "Mom and Dad's Waltz", "Travelin' Blues", and the number-one1 hit "Give Me More, More, More (Of Your Kisses)." In August 1951, he was arrested backstage at the Grand Ole Opry in Nashville, Tennessee, and charged with contributing to the delinquency of a minor; the charge stemmed from a liaison in Arkansas during his tour with Williams. The charges were dropped and Frizzell was never prosecuted.

By 1952, he was a popular stage performer and in heavy demand, being included on the Grand Ole Opry and the Louisiana Hayride multiple times throughout the 1950s. The hits continued throughout 1952, with "How Long Will It Take (To Stop Loving You)", "Don't Stay Away ('Till Love Grows Cold)", "Forever (And Always)", and "I'm an Old, Old Man (Try'n'a Live While I Can)".

Despite his massive success, things began to go downhill for Frizzell. He fired his manager and band, and joined the Grand Ole Opry; however, he quit very soon thereafter. Though he was earning a lot of money, he was spending almost all of it. He began to work with the Arkansas-born singer-songwriter Wayne Raney, but the sessions were considered a failure.

Frizell had an automobile accident in 1952, moved to Los Angeles in early 1953, and earned a spot as a regular cast member on the Town Hall Party television show on KTTV. His songs still charted, but only one entered the top 10 that year.

In January 1954, Frizzell had another automobile accident, near E.S. Richardson Elementary School in Minden, Louisiana, through which he passed after leaving the Louisiana Hayride in Shreveport en route to a concert in Mississippi. His Cadillac struck the Nash station wagon parked at the home of its owner, R. Harmon Drew, Sr., the former city judge and later a member of the Louisiana House of Representatives. Frizzell apologized, said that he hoped to visit Minden again under more favorable circumstances, posted bond, and took a taxicab back to Shreveport, from which he flew to his destination. In early 1954, he reached the top 10 for the last time for five years.

Having had few hits in the middle to late 1950s, he felt burnt out and had little energy for his career. He became frustrated that Columbia Records did not release what he thought to be his best material, so he stopped writing and recording songs. He toured extensively, however.

In 1959, deciding on change, Frizell began to work at Nashville's Cedarwood Publishing Company with Jim Denny. His first Top 10 hit in five years came with "Long Black Veil" that year. He moved to Nashville in 1960 after the Town Hall Party closed and began touring and recording more and more, scoring some minor hits.

Lefty's last big hit came in 1964 with the number-one song "Saginaw, Michigan", which earned him a Grammy nomination. The next year, "She's Gone, Gone, Gone" was his last top-20 hit. However, "I Never Go Around Mirrors" from his last studio album The Legendary is considered one of the greatest country songs of all time. It has been recorded over 22 times since, with Keith Whitley's version standing out as one of the best versions.

== Personal troubles, later years, and death ==
Frizzell began a downward spiral after developing a debilitating alcohol problem. Despite his history of infidelity, arrests for sex with underage fans, contractual legal troubles, and automobile accidents, Alice Harper remained his wife, and their marriage produced three children.

During the late 1960s, he recorded many songs, but Columbia released very few. Because of his declining record sales, he began to perform less. In 1968, he recorded with June Stearns as Agnes and Orville.

In early 1972, Frizzell left Columbia Records and signed with ABC Records. That same year, he was inducted into the Nashville Songwriters Hall of Fame, and his song "If You've Got the Money (I've Got the Time)" earned him the Grammy Hall of Fame Award in 1999.

By this time, drinking was taking a toll on him. He had developed chronic hypertension, his appearance had changed drastically, and his voice had deteriorated. On July 19, 1975, at age 47, Frizzell died of a massive stroke and was buried at Forest Lawn Memorial Gardens in Goodlettsville, Tennessee. Frizzell was inducted into the Country Music Hall of Fame in October 1982.

== Guitar ==
Frizzell's custom guitar

Frizzell's signature guitar was a 1949 Gibson J-200 (Model SJ-200). Originally built by the Gibson Guitar Corporation, it was retrofitted in early 1951 with a custom neck and pickguard by guitar maker and innovator Paul Bigsby. In a 2003 interview, Merle Haggard recalled, "When I was a teenager, Lefty got me onstage [at the Rainbow Garden in Bakersfield, California], and handed me that guitar. That is the first guitar I played on a professional stage." For many years, the guitar had been on loan to and displayed at the Country Music Hall of Fame in Nashville, Tennessee. In January 2005, it was returned to the Frizzell family and was later sold via auction by Retrofret, with an asking price of $350,000; Haggard purchased the guitar and it remains a part of his estate.

== Legacy and influence ==
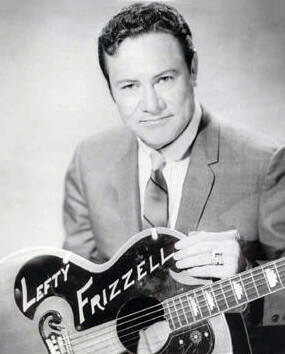
Frizzell circa 1955

Frizzell's style of singing influenced a great many singers, particularly Merle Haggard, Willie Nelson, George Jones, Keith Whitley, and Roy Orbison. In addition, he was widely recognized for his songwriting talents. In the foreword to a biography of Frizzell by his younger brother David Frizzell, Merle Haggard said, "The impact Lefty had on country music is not even measurable. ... No one could handle a song like Lefty. He would hold on to each word until he finally decided to drop it and pick up the next one. Most of us learned to sing listening to him."

Stoney Edwards recorded "Hank and Lefty Raised My Country Soul", a tribute to Hank Williams and Frizzell, written by Dallas Frazier. It hit the Top 40 in 1973.

George Strait recorded a Sanger D. Shafer song called "Lefty's Gone" on the album Something Special. In addition, Willie Nelson's 1977 album, To Lefty From Willie was a tribute to Frizzell and consisted entirely of cover versions of Frizzell songs. Frizzell was inducted into the Country Music Hall of Fame in 1982 and has a star on the Hollywood Walk of Fame. He is also in the Rockabilly Hall of Fame along with his son Crockett Frizzell. Frizzell ranked number 31 on CMT's 2003 40 Greatest Men of Country Music.

Fellow Texan Roy Orbison was a devout fan of Frizzell's sound, and in 1988, as a part of the Traveling Wilburys, he chose the name "Lefty Wilbury" to honor his musical hero.

Maine singer-songwriter David Mallett included Frizzell's "Saginaw, Michigan" on his 2014 album The Horse I Rode in On.

His younger brother, David Frizzell, is also a country singer. His biggest hits were 1982's "I'm Gonna Hire a Wino (To Decorate Our Home)" and "You're the Reason God Made Oklahoma", a 1981 duet with Shelly West. Their youngest brother, Allen Frizzell followed in his older brothers' footsteps in country music. He was an opening performer for Dottie West. He was also married to Shelly West, Dottie West's daughter. Allen also played with Keith Whitley. He now plays country gospel music.

Lefty and David's great nephew, Miles Frizzell, is a member of many acclaimed Beatles tribute bands notably The Bootleg Beatles and Classical Mystery Tour.

In 2006, J.D. Crowe and the New South released the album Lefty's Old Guitar. The song "Lefty's Old Guitar" was written about his custom Gibson J-200.

Daryle Singletary referenced Frizzell in his song "Ain't It the Truth" on an album by the same name, released by Giant Records in 1998.

In 2019, Frizzell's single "Long Black Veil" was selected by the U.S. Library of Congress for preservation in the National Recording Registry for being "culturally, historically, or aesthetically significant".

In 2024, Cody Jinks released the album Cody Jinks Sings Lefty Frizzell, featuring nine songs by Frizzell.

== Discography ==
=== Number-one country hits ===
1. "If You've Got the Money (I've Got the Time)" (1950)
2. "I Love You a Thousand Ways" (1950)
3. "I Want to Be with You Always" (1951)
4. "Always Late (With Your Kisses)" (1951)
5. "Give Me More, More, More (Of Your Kisses)" (1952)
6. "Saginaw, Michigan" (1964)

== See also ==
- Jim Beck
