= Theme Time Radio Hour season 1 =

The first season of the Theme Time Radio Hour, hosted by Bob Dylan, ran from May 3, 2006, to April 18, 2007 on XM Satellite Radio for a total of 50 shows.

== Overview ==
With the exception of the Halloween show - Episode 26 - introduced by comedian Steven Wright, all the episodes in Season One were introduced by an uncredited Ellen Barkin who would open with the lines, "It's night (or night time) in the Big City" and then describe a city scene - such as a woman walking in the rain, a shopkeeper closing his doors, angry hookers arguing on a street corner - before introducing the show and "your host, Bob Dylan." Barkin would identify herself in a Christmas greeting delivered to listeners on Season One's Christmas/New Year Special - Episode 34 - ending fan speculation as to whether it was her voice in the introduction. Barkin was officially named as the show's introductory announcer in an XM press release for Season Two.

Season One's closing credits were delivered by announcer "Pierre Mancini".

Interspersed between the music on the shows are old station promos and jingles; pre-recorded show promos and commentary from personalities such as Penn Jillette, Jimmy Kimmel and Sarah Silverman; Dylan answering email the show has supposedly received (some of the emails are obviously made up. However, at least one email read on the "Friends and Neighbors" episode, came from a real listener.); Dylan reading poetry, often citing the author as a "def poet;" occasional food and drink recipes; even household cleaning tips from Dylan; and his comments on the music and musicians the show is featuring. Although most of Dylan's monologues are scripted - keen-eared listeners can hear him turning pages and members of various Dylan Web forums have pointed out the similarities between his stories and Wikipedia entries on the same subject - he has had the occasional memorable outburst which sounded as if it came directly from the heart, such as this one on country music from the "Friends and Neighbors" episode (Episode 17):

“Now I love country music, but I say 'What happened to it?'

"You hear a song like this and it's obvious it's about real people, and real emotions, and real problems, that's all, that's the country music we learned to love. Nowadays they want to sweep all the problems under the rug and pretend they don't exist.

"Well guess what folks – they do exist! And if you try and sweep 'em under the rug, they're just gonna pop up somewhere else. So we might as well all just face it and listen to the old style country music, the real country music. You know, about drinking and sleeping around. That's my kinda country music, and I hope yours!"

All but three of Season One's episodes ran one hour in length, the exceptions being the 2-hour Christmas/New Year special, the 2-hour season finale (Episode 50 - "Spring Cleaning") and Episode 24, "Time," which ran into overtime for approximately 13 additional minutes, apparently in a joking reference to the episode's subject matter.

== Season 1 - Episodes 1 to 50 ==
=== Episode 1: Weather ===
First aired on May 3, 2006.

1. "Blow Wind Blow" – Muddy Waters (1953)
2. "You Are My Sunshine" – Jimmie Davis (1940)
3. "California Sun" – Joe Jones (1961)
4. "I Don't Care if the Sun Don't Shine" – Dean Martin with Paul Weston & His Dixieland Eight (1950)
5. "Just Walkin' in the Rain" – The Prisonaires (1953)
6. "After the Clouds Roll Away" – The Consolers (1961)
7. "The Wind Cries Mary" – The Jimi Hendrix Experience (1967)
8. "Come Rain or Come Shine" – Judy Garland (1963)
9. "It's Raining" – Irma Thomas (1962)
10. "Didn't It Rain" – Sister Rosetta Tharpe (1947)
11. "Rainin' in My Heart" – Slim Harpo (1961)
12. "Jamaica Hurricane" – Lord Beginner (1950)
13. "Let the Four Winds Blow" – Fats Domino (1961)
14. "Stormy Weather" – The Spaniels (1957)
15. "A Place in the Sun" (Italian Version) – Stevie Wonder (1966)
16. "Summer Wind" – Frank Sinatra (1966)
17. "Uncloudy Day" – The Staple Singers (1957)
18. "Keep on the Sunny Side" – The Carter Family (1928)

=== Episode 2: Mother ===
First aired on May 10, 2006.

1. "Mama Don't Allow It" – Julia Lee (1947)
2. "Daddy Loves Mommy-O" – Tommy Duncan (1956)
3. "Mama Didn't Lie" – Jan Bradley (1963)
4. "I'll Go to Church Again With Momma" – Buck Owens & His Buckaroos (1965)
5. "Mama Told Me Not to Come" – Randy Newman (1970)
6. "Mama Get the Hammer" – Bobby Peterson Quintet (1961)
7. "Mama Talk To Your Daughter" – J. B. Lenoir (1954)
8. "A Mother's Love" – Earl King (1954)
9. "(Mama) He Treats Your Daughter Mean" – Ruth Brown (1953)
10. "Let Old Mother Nature Have Her Way" – Carl Smith (1951)
11. "Mother Earth" – Memphis Slim (1951)
12. "Mother-in-Law" – Ernie K-Doe (1961)
13. "Mother In Law Blues" – Little Junior Parker (1956)
14. "Mama Tried" – Merle Haggard (1968)
15. "Gonna Tell Your Mother" – Jimmy McCracklin (1955)
16. "Have You Seen Your Mother, Baby, Standing in the Shadow?" – Rolling Stones (1966)
17. "Mother Fuyer" – Dirty Red (1949)
18. "Mama Said Knock You Out" – LL Cool J (1990)

=== Episode 3: Drinking ===
First aired on May 17, 2006.

1. "Ain't Got no Money to Pay for this Drink" – George Zimmerman and the Thrills (1956)
2. "Wine, Wine, Wine" – The Electric Flag (1967)
3. "Don't Come Home A-Drinkin' (With Lovin' on Your Mind)" – Loretta Lynn (1966)
4. "Daddy and the Wine" – Porter Wagoner & The Wagonmasters (1968)
5. "I Drink" – Mary Gauthier (2005)
6. "I Drink" – Charles Aznavour (1995)
7. "Sloppy Drunk" – Jimmy Rogers (1954)
8. "I Ain't Drunk" – Lonnie The Cat (1954)
9. "It Ain't Far to the Bar" – Johnny Tyler and His Riders of the Rio Grande (1949)
10. "What's On The Bar" – Hank Williams Jr (2003)
11. "One Mint Julep" – The Clovers (1952)
12. "Rum and Coca-Cola" – The Andrews Sisters (1945)
13. "One Bourbon, One Scotch, One Beer" – John Lee Hooker (1966)
14. "Who Will Buy the Wine" – Charlie Walker (1960)
15. "Buddy Stay Off That Wine" – Betty Hall Jones (1949)
16. "Whiskey You're The Devil" – Clancy Brothers and Tommy Makem (1962)

=== Episode 4: Baseball ===
First aired on May 24, 2006.

1. "Take Me Out To The Ball Game" – Bob Dylan (a capella) (2006)
2. "Take Me Out To The Ball Game" – The Skeletons (1988)
3. "Baseball Boogie" – Mabel Scott (1950)
4. "Home Run" – Chance Halladay (1959)
5. "Baseball Baby" – Johnny Darling (1958)
6. "Three Strikes And You're Out" – Cowboy Copas (1960)
7. "The Ball Game" – Sister Wynona Carr (1952)
8. "Did You See Jackie Robinson Hit That Ball" – Buddy Johnson (1949)
9. "Joltin' Joe DiMaggio" – Les Brown & His Orchestra with Betty Bonney (1941)
10. "Joe DiMaggio's Done It Again" – Billy Bragg & Wilco (2000)
11. "Don Newcombe Really Throws That Ball" – Teddy Brannon Orchestra with Dickie Thompson (1950)
12. "Newk's Fadeaway" – Sonny Rollins Quartet (1951)
13. "Say Hey" – The Treniers with Willie Mays (1954)
14. "The Wizard Of Oz" – Sam Bush (2004)
15. "3rd Base, Dodger Stadium" – Ry Cooder with James Bla Pahinui (2005)
16. "Heart" – Damn Yankees Original Broadway Cast (1955)

=== Episode 5: Coffee ===
First aired on May 31, 2006.

1. "Java Jive" – The Ink Spots (1940)
2. "One Cup of Coffee and a Cigarette" – Jerry Irby (1947)
3. "The Coffee Song" – Frank Sinatra (1961)
4. "Black Coffee in Bed" – Squeeze (1982)
5. "Cigarettes and Coffee" – Otis Redding (1966)
6. "Caffeine and Nicotine" – Curtis Gordon (1954)
7. "Cigarettes and Coffee Blues" – Lefty Frizzell (1958)
8. "Coffee Blues" – Lightnin' Hopkins (1951)
9. "Keep That Coffee Hot" – Scatman Crothers (1955)
10. "Coffee Cigarettes and Tears" – The Larks (1951)
11. "Black Coffee" – Bobby Darin (1959)
12. "Raindrops In My Coffee" – Sexsmith and Kerr (2005)
13. "Coffee and TV" – Blur (1999)
14. "Forty Cups of Coffee" – Ella Mae Morse (1953)
15. "Let's Have Another Cup of Coffee" – Glenn Miller Orchestra (1942)

=== Episode 6: Jail ===
First aired on June 7, 2006.

1. "Folsom Prison Blues" – Johnny Cash (1956)
2. "21 Days in Jail" – Magic Sam (1958)
3. "Send Me to the 'Lectric Chair" – Bessie Smith (1927)
4. "Prisoner's Song" – Warren Storm (1958)
5. "Back on the Chain Gang" – The Pretenders (1982)
6. "Jail Bait" – Andre Williams (1956)
7. "Prison Wall Blues" – Cannon's Jug Stompers (1930)
8. "Columbus Stockade Blues" – Kenny Lane & His Bull Dogs (1960)
9. "Nine Pound Steel" – Joe Simon (1968)
10. "Okie's in the Pokie" – Jimmy Patton (1960)
11. "Christmas in Prison" – John Prine (1973)
12. "In the Jailhouse Now" – Sir Douglas Quintet (1965)
13. "Jailbird Love Song" – The Mississippi Sheiks (1930)
14. "Riot in Cell Block #9" – Wanda Jackson (1960)
15. "Sing Me Back Home" – Merle Haggard (1968)
16. "Last Meal" – Hurricane Harry (1956)

=== Episode 7: Father ===
First aired on June 14, 2006.

1. "Song for My Father" – The Horace Silver Quintet (1964)
2. "Daddy and Home" – Jimmie Rodgers (1928)
3. "Daddy's Home" – Shep & the Limelites (1961)
4. "That Silver Haired Daddy of Mine" – The Everly Brothers (1958)
5. "Dust Got Into Daddy's Eyes" – Bobby 'Blue' Bland (1965)
6. "Daddy" – Julie London (1961)
7. "Your Dad Did" – John Hiatt (1987)
8. "My Daddy" – The Sons of the Pioneers (1934)
9. "Color Him Father" – The Winstons (1969)
10. "Papa's on the Housetop" – Leroy Carr & Scrapper Blackwell (1930)
11. "Mama Loves Papa (And Papa Loves The Women)" – Jack Rhodes & His Lone Star Buddies (1951)
12. "Papa Was a Rollin' Stone" – The Temptations (1972)
13. "Father Time" – Lowell Fulson (1963)
14. "Father Alone" – The Swan Silvertones (1946)
15. "Patsy Girl" – Ross MacManus (1964)
16. "My Son Calls Another Man Daddy" – Hank Williams (1950)

=== Episode 8: Wedding ===
First aired on June 21, 2006.

1. "Wedding Bells (Are Breaking Up That Old Gang Of Mine)" – Fred Rich & His Orchestra (1929)
2. "Getting Married Soon" – Prince La La (1962)
3. "(Today I Met) The Boy I'm Gonna Marry" – Darlene Love (1963)
4. "Married Man's A Fool" – Ry Cooder (1974)
5. "Wedlock Is a Padlock" – Laura Lee (1970)
6. "I Knew the Bride (When She Used to Rock and Roll)" – Dave Edmunds (1977)
7. "Stop the Wedding" – Etta James (1962)
8. "Don't Stop the Wedding" – Ann Cole (1962)
9. "Fanny Brown Got Married" – Roy Brown (1954)
10. "Get Me to the Church on Time" – Rosemary Clooney (1956)
11. "I'm a Married Man" – Johnny Tyler & His Riders of the Rio Grande (1948)
12. "Leave Married Women Alone" – Jimmy Cavallo (1951)
13. "Married Woman" – Big Joe Turner (1954)
14. "Love and Marriage" – Frank Sinatra (1965)
15. "The Man Who Wrote 'Home Sweet Home' Never Was A Married Man" – Charlie Poole with Charlie Parker & Mack Woolbright (1927)
16. "Where Were You (On Our Wedding Day)" – Lloyd Price (1959)

=== Episode 9: Divorce ===
First aired on June 28, 2006.

1. "D.I.V.O.R.C.E." – Tammy Wynette (1968)
2. "The Grand Tour" – George Jones (1974)
3. "Alimony" – Tommy Tucker (1965)
4. "She Got the Goldmine (I Got the Shaft)" – Jerry Reed (1982)
5. "Alimony Blues" – T-Bone Walker (1951)
6. "(Pay Me) Alimony" – Maddox Brothers and Rose (1946)
7. "Alimony Blues" – Eddie 'Cleanhead' Vinson & His Orchestra (1947)
8. "Divorce Decree" – Doris Duke (1981)
9. "Married by the Bible, Divorced by the Law" – Hank Snow (1962)
10. "Alimony" – Huey "Piano" Smith & His Clowns (1959)
11. "Divorce Me C.O.D." – Merle Travis (1946)
12. "Mexican Divorce" – The Drifters (1962)
13. "Will Your Lawyer Talk to God?" – Kitty Wells (1964)
14. "Mr. and Mrs. Used to Be – Ernest Tubb & Loretta Lynn (1965)
15. "You Can't Divorce My Heart" – Lefty Frizzell (1951)
16. "Love Doesn't Live Here Anymore" – June Christy (1953)

=== Episode 10: Summer ===
First aired on July 5, 2006.

1. "Summertime" – Billy Stewart (1966)
2. "Summertime Blues" – Eddie Cochran (1958)
3. "(Love Is Like A) Heat Wave" – Martha & the Vandellas (1963)
4. "Heat Wave" – Sol K. Bright and His Hollywaiians (1935)
5. "Sunny" – Bobby Hebb (1966)
6. "Juneteenth Jamboree" – Gladys Bentley (attributed to 'Fatso Bentley')(?)
7. "So Nice" – Astrud Gilberto and Walter Wanderley (1966)
8. "Youth of 1000 Summers" – Van Morrison (1990)
9. "Hot Weather Blues" – Mr. Sad Head (1951)
10. "Summer in the City" – The Lovin' Spoonful (1966)
11. "Too Hot" – Prince Buster (1967)
12. "In the Summertime" – Mungo Jerry (1970)
13. "Ice Cream Man" – John Brim (1953)
14. "Fourth of July" – Dave Alvin (1994)
15. "Hot Fun in the Summertime" – Sly & the Family Stone (1969)

=== Episode 11: Flowers ===
First aired on July 12, 2006.

1. "New San Antonio Rose" – Bob Wills & His Texas Playboys (1940)
2. "Grazing in the Grass" – The Friends of Distinction (1968)
3. "A Good Year for the Roses" – George Jones (1970)
4. "The Bonny Bunch of Roses" – Paul Clayton (1957)
5. "Laying on a Bed of Roses" – The Muffs (1995)
6. "The Grape Vine" – Lucky Millinder & His Orchestra (1951)
7. "Tulip Or Turnip" – Duke Ellington & His Orchestra (1947)
8. "Tiptoe Through the Tulips" – Tiny Tim (1968)
9. "Wildwood Flower" – The Carter Family (1928)
10. "When the Roses Bloom Again" – Laura Cantrell (2002)
11. "Only a Rose" – Geraint Watkins (2004)
12. "I Threw Away the Rose" – Merle Haggard (1967)
13. "Don't Let the Green Grass Fool You" – Wilson Pickett (1971)
14. "The Sharpest Thorn" – Elvis Costello & Allen Toussaint (2006)

=== Episode 12: Cars ===
First aired on July 19, 2006.

1. "Rocket 88" – Jackie Brenston and His Delta Cats (1951)
2. "Cadillac Ranch" – Bruce Springsteen (1980)
3. "Every Woman I Know (Crazy 'Bout Automobiles)" – Billy "The Kid" Emerson (1953)
4. "Me and My Chauffeur Blues" – Memphis Minnie (1941)
5. "My Automobile" – George Clinton & The Parliaments (1970)
6. "Christian's Automobile" – The Dixie Hummingbirds (1957)
7. "Car on a Hill" – Joni Mitchell (1974)
8. "Pontiac commercial: Old McDonald" – Frank Sinatra (1960)
9. "Pontiac Blues" – Sonny Boy Williamson II (1950)
10. "Big Green Car" – Jimmy Carroll (1958)
11. "Get Out of the Car" – Richard Berry (1955)
12. "Mercury Blues" – David Lindley (1981)
13. "Too Many Drivers at the Wheel" – Smiley Lewis (1955)
14. "Little Red Corvette" – Prince (1983)
15. "No Money Down – Chuck Berry (1955)

=== Episode 13: Rich Man, Poor Man ===
First aired on July 26, 2006.

1. "The Rich Man And The Poor Man" – Bob Miller (1932)
2. "Rags to Riches" – Tony Bennett (1953)
3. "Get Rich Quick" – Richard Penniman (Little Richard) (1953)
4. "Charming Betsy" – The Farmer Boys (1956)
5. "Brother, Can You Spare a Dime?" – Bing Crosby (1932)
6. "On the Nickel" – Tom Waits (1980)
7. "Taxes On The Farmer Feeds Us All" – Fiddlin' John Carson and Moonshine Kate (1924)
8. "Hobo, You Can't Ride This Train" – Louis Armstrong (1932)
9. "Do Re Mi" – Woody Guthrie (1937)
10. "Rich Woman" – Li'l Millet & His Creoles (1972)
11. "Poor Side of Town" – Johnny Rivers (1966)
12. "The Welfare (Turns Its Back On You)" – Freddie King (1963)
13. "If You're So Smart, How Come You Ain't Rich?" – Louis Jordan (1950)
14. "Hobo's Lullaby" – Emmylou Harris (1988)

=== Episode 14: The Devil ===
First aired on August 2, 2006.

1. "Me and the Devil Blues" – Robert Johnson (1936)
2. "Satan Is Real" – The Louvin Brothers (1958)
3. "Friend of the Devil" – Grateful Dead (1970)
4. "(You're the) Devil in Disguise" – Elvis Presley (1963)
5. "The Devil Ain't Lazy" – Bob Wills and His Texas Playboys (1948)
6. "Christine's Tune (The Devil in Disguise)" – The Flying Burrito Brothers (1969)
7. "Suzanne Beware of the Devil" – Dandy Livingston (1972)
8. "Devil in His Heart" – The Donays (1962)
9. "Must Have been the Devil" – Otis Spann (1954)
10. "Devil's Hot Rod" – Johnny Tyler (1955)
11. "Devil Got My Woman" – Skip James (1931)
12. "Between The Devil And The Deep Blue Sea" – Count Basie & His Orchestra with Helen Humes (1939)
13. "Devil with a Blue Dress On" – Shorty Long (1964)
14. "Devils Haircut" – Beck (1996)
15. "Race With the Devil" – Gene Vincent (1956)
16. "Way Down in the Hole" – Tom Waits (1987)
17. "Go Devil Go" – Sister Lille Mae Littlejohn (1948)

=== Episode 15: Eyes ===
First aired on August 9, 2006.

1. "Brown Eyed Handsome Man" – Chuck Berry (1956)
2. "20/20 Vision" – Jimmy Martin (1954)
3. "Brown Eyed Girl" – Van Morrison (1967)
4. "My Blue Eyed Jane" – Jimmie Rodgers (1930)
5. "She Winked Her Eye" – Clarence "Gatemouth" Brown (1951)
6. "Spanish Eyes" – Al Martino (1966)
7. "Keep An Eye On Love" – Ernestine Anderson (1963)
8. "Eye Balling" – Chuck Higgins (1955)
9. "Brown Eyes" – The Blue Sky Boys (1940)
10. "Eyesight to the Blind" – Sonny Boy Williamson II (1951)
11. "Tell Me My Lying Eyes Are Wrong" – George Jones (1970)
12. "Raging Eyes" – Nick Lowe (1983)
13. "Bloodshot Eyes" – Wynonie 'Mr Blues' Harris (1951)
14. "I Still Miss Someone" – Johnny Cash (1958)
15. "I Only Have Eyes For You" – The Flamingos (1959)
16. "Dry Your Eyes" – The Streets (2004)

=== Episode 16: Dogs ===
First aired on August 16, 2006.

1. "Serenade To A Poodle" – Slim Gaillard (1948)
2. "(How Much Is) That Doggie in the Window?" – Patti Page (1953)
3. "Ain't I'm A Dog?" – Ronnie Self (1957)
4. "Stop Kickin' My Dog Around" – Rufus Thomas (1963)
5. "Dog" – Bob Dorough (1966)
6. "I'll Take the Dog" – Jean Shepard and Ray Pillow (1966)
7. "Old Shep" – Red Foley (1956)
8. "How Come My Bulldog Don't Bark?" – Howard Tate (1967)
9. "Bird Dog" – The Everly Brothers (1958)
10. "A New Salty Dog" – The Allen Brothers (1930)
11. "Hound Dog" – Freddie Bell and the Bellboys (1955)
12. "The Dog House Boogie" – Hawkshaw Hawkins (1948)
13. "I Wanna Be Your Dog" – Uncle Tupelo (1992)
14. "Russian Satellite" – The Mighty Sparrow (1958)
15. "I'm Walking The Dog" – Webb Pierce (1955)
16. "Lassie" – Theme from TV series

=== Episode 17: Friends & Neighbors ===
First aired on August 23, 2006.
Released in 2009 as a bonus CD with "Together Through Life".

1. "Howdy Neighbor" – Porter Wagoner & the Wagonmasters (1967)
2. "Don't Take Everybody To Be Your Friend" – Sister Rosetta Tharpe (1946)
3. "Diamonds Are a Girl's Best Friend" – T Bone Burnett (1982)
4. "La Valse d'Amitie" – Doc Guidry (1966)
5. "Make Friends" – Moon Mullican (1963)
6. "My Next Door Neighbor" – Jerry McCain (1957)
7. "Let's Invite Them Over" – George Jones & Melba Montgomery (1963)
8. "My Friends" – Howlin' Wolf (1952)
9. "Last Night" – Little Walter (1952)
10. "You've Got a Friend" – Carole King (1971)
11. "Bad Neighborhood" – Ronnie & The Delinquents (1960)
12. "Neighbours" – Rolling Stones (1981)
13. "Too Many Parties and Too Many Pals" – Hank Williams Sr as Luke the Drifter (1953)
14. "Why Can't We Be Friends?" – War (1975)

=== Episode 18: Radio ===
First aired on August 30, 2006.

1. "Turn Your Radio On" – Grandpa Jones (1965)
2. "Roadrunner" – The Modern Lovers (1976)
3. "Cool Disc Jockey" – Boyd Bennett and His Rockets (1959)
4. "Border Radio" – The Blasters (1981)
5. "On Your Radio" – Richard Lanham (1957)
6. Radio Commercials – Lord Melody (1965)
7. "This is Radio Clash" – The Clash (1981)
8. "Those DJ Shows" – Patrice Holloway (1964)
9. "Caravan" – Van Morrison (1970)
10. "Disc Jockey Blues" – Luke Jones and His Orchestra (1948)
11. "My Hi-Fi to Cry By" – Bonnie Owens (1969)
12. "Canned Music" – Dan Hicks and His Hot Licks (1969)
13. "Radio Boogie" – L.C. Smith and His Southern Playboys (1953)
14. "Radio Radio" – Elvis Costello and The Attractions (1978)

=== Episode 19: The Bible ===
First aired on September 6, 2006.

1. "Are You Bound for Heaven or Hell" – Rev. J. M. Gates (1926)
2. "Bottle and a Bible" – The Yayhoos (2001)
3. "Samson and Delilah" – Rev. Gary Davis (1956)
4. "He Will Set Your Fields on Fire" – Kitty Wells (1959)
5. "Adam Come and Get Your Rib" – Wynonie Harris (1952)
6. "The Old Ark's A'Moving" – A. A. Gray and Seven Foot Dilly (1930)
7. "Denomination Blues" – Washington Phillips (1929)
8. "I'm Using My Bible for a Road Map" – The Four Internes (1953)
9. "Elijah Rock" – Ollabelle with Amy Helm (2004)
10. "The Rivers Of Babylon" – The Melodians (1972)
11. "John The Revelator" – Blind Willie Johnson (1930)
12. "Boogie Woogie Preaching Man" – Jess Willard (1952)
13. "Oh Mary Don't You Weep" – The Swan Silvertones (1959)
14. "That's What the Good Book Says" – The Robins (1950)

=== Episode 20: Musical Map ===
First aired on September 13, 2006.

1. "I've Been Everywhere" – Hank Snow (1962)
2. "Mardi Gras in New Orleans" – Professor Longhair and the Shuffling Hungarians (1949)
3. "El Paso" – Marty Robbins (1959)
4. "Kansas City" – Wilbert Harrison (1959)
5. "Hawaiian Cowboy" – Sol K. Bright & His Hollywaiians (1936)
6. "Stars Fell on Alabama" – Jack Teagarden (1934)
7. "Jersey Girl" – Tom Waits (1980)
8. "The Tale of the Knoxville Girl" – The Louvin Brothers (1956)
9. "Jackson" – Nancy Sinatra and Lee Hazlewood (1967)
10. "Louisiana" – Percy Mayfield (1951)
11. "I Used to Work in Chicago" – Tin Ear Tanner & His Backroom Boys (1950)
12. "Baltimore Fire" – Charlie Poole (1929)
13. "My Head's in Mississippi" – ZZ Top (1990)
14. "Take Me Back to Tulsa" – Bob Wills and His Texas Playboys (1941)

=== Episode 21: School ===
First aired on September 20, 2006

1. "You Don't Learn That In School" – Nat King Cole (1947)
2. "Back To Schooldays" – Graham Parker (1976)
3. "High School USA (Minneapolis/St Paul version)" – Tommy Facenda (1959)
4. "Don't Be a Drop-Out" – James Brown (1966)
5. "Waitin' in School" – Ricky Nelson (1957)
6. "Homework" – Otis Rush (1962)
7. "I Love The College Girls" – Harry Reser and His Six Jumping Jacks (1927)
8. "Hey Little School Girl" – The Marquees (1957)
9. "Play It Cool, Stay In School" – Brenda Holloway & The Supremes (1966)
10. "Professor Bop" – Babs Gonzales (1947)
11. "Wonderful World" – Sam Cooke (1960)
12. "School of Rock 'n Roll" – Gene Summers (1958)
13. "Still In School" – NRBQ (1977)
14. "To Sir With Love" – Lulu (1967)
15. "High School Confidential" – Jerry Lee Lewis (1958)
16. "Stay In School" – Otis Redding (1967)
17. "School's Out" – Alice Cooper (1972)
18. "Good Morning, School Girl" – Sonny Boy Williamson I (1937)

=== Episode 22: Telephone ===
First aired on September 27, 2006.

1. "The Telephone Call" – Kraftwerk (1986)
2. "Talk to Me Baby (I Can't Hold Out)" – Elmore James (1960)
3. "Atomic Telephone" – The Spirit of Memphis Quartet (1952)
4. "Pennsylvania 6-5000" – Glenn Miller Orchestra (1940)
5. "842-3089 (Call My Name)" – Etta James (1967)
6. "Telephone Blues" – Eddie Gorman and His Group (1949)
7. "The Jukebox And The Phone" – Lattie Moore (1959)
8. "Wrong Number" – George Jones (1965)
9. "Party Line" – The Kinks (1966)
10. "The People On My Party Line" – Eddie 'Cleanhead' Vinson (1952)
11. "As Soon as I Hang Up the Phone" – Loretta Lynn & Conway Twitty (1974)
12. "Long Distance Call" – Muddy Waters (1950)
13. "Your Wires Have Been Tapped" – Pigmeat Markham (1968)
14. "Hanging on the Telephone" – Blondie (1978)
15. "Long Distance Operator" – Little Milton (1950)
16. "Hold The Phone" – Hank Penny (1951)
17. "La Bochinchera" – Machito & His Orchestra with Graciela Perez Grillo (1965)
18. "Wrong Number (I'm Sorry, Goodbye)" – Aaron Neville (1967)
19. "Telephone Is Ringing" – Pee Wee Crayton (1956)
20. "Le Jeu Du Téléphone" – Natacha Snitkine (1967)

=== Episode 23: Water ===
First aired on October 4, 2006.

1. "Mommy Give Me A Drink Of Water" – Danny Kaye (1958)
2. "Wade in the Water" – Ramsey Lewis Trio (1966)
3. "Cool Clear Water" – Bob Nolan & The Sons of the Pioneers (1941)
4. "You Don't Miss Your Water" – William Bell (1961)
5. "High Water Everywhere Part 1" – Charley Patton (1929)
6. "Water Water" – Effie Smith and The Squires (1956)
7. "You Left The Water Running" – Booker T & The MG's (1965)
8. "Pouring Water On A Drowning Man" – James Carr (1966)
9. "Cold Dark Waters" – Porter Wagoner & The Wagonmasters (1962)
10. "I'd Rather Drink Muddy Water" – The Cats and the Fiddle (1940)
11. "Louisiana 1927" – Randy Newman (1974)
12. "Cool Drink Of Water Blues" – Tommy Johnson (1929)
13. "I Asked For Water, She Brought Me Gasoline" – Howlin' Wolf (1956)
14. "Dirty Water" – The Standells (1966)
15. "Jesus Gave Me Water" – The Five Blind Boys of Mississippi (1950)
16. "Backwater Blues" – Lonnie Johnson (1948)
17. "Still Blue Water" – Jimmy Keith Orchestra with Myra Taylor (1946)
18. "Ice Water" – Glenn Barber (1954)
19. "Grand Coulee Dam" – Ramblin' Jack Elliott (1960)

=== Episode 24: Time ===
First aired on October 11, 2006. This episode exceeded the usual 1 hour duration by approximately 17 minutes.

1. "Time After Time" – Ben Webster (1959)
2. "Time Is on My Side" – Irma Thomas (1964)
3. "Right Place Wrong Time" – Dr John (1973)
4. "As Time Goes By" – Arthur 'Dooley' Wilson (1942)
5. "Time Marches On" – Derrick Morgan (1961)
6. "All The Time" – Sleepy LaBeef (1957)
7. "Only Time Will Tell" – Etta James (1966)
8. "Twenty Four Hours" – Eddie Boyd (1953)
9. "Turn Back the Hands of Time" – Tyrone Davis (1970)
10. "Life Begins At 4 O'Clock" – Bobby Milano (1958)
11. "Sixty Minute Man" – Billy Ward & The Dominoes (1951)
12. "Fifteen Minute Intermission" – Cab Calloway (1940)
13. "Funny How Time Slips Away" – Willie Nelson (1962)
14. "September Song" – Lou Reed (1985)
15. "Two Years Of Torture" – Ray Charles (1959)
16. "Walkin' After Midnight" – Patsy Cline (1957)
17. "Midnight Hour" – Clarence "Gatemouth" Brown (1954)
18. "What Time Is It" – Eugene Pitt and The Jive Five (1962)
19. "Armagideon Time" – Willie Williams (1979)
20. "Time Has Come Today" – The Chambers Brothers (1968)

=== Episode 25: Guns ===
First aired on October 18, 2006.

1. "For A Few Dollars More" – Ennio Morricone (1964)
2. "Shotgun" – Junior Walker & The All Stars (1965)
3. "The Shotgun Boogie" – Tennessee Ernie Ford (1951)
4. "The Hunter" – Albert King (1967)
5. "Guns Fever (Blam Blam Fever)" – The Valentines (1967)
6. "Tommy Gun" – The Clash (1978)
7. "This Gun Don't Care Who It Shoots" – Wanda Jackson (1967)
8. "I Got My Equalizer" – Robert Jefferson (194?)
9. "Back in the Saddle Again" – Gene Autry (1939)
10. "Don't Take Your Guns to Town" – Johnny Cash (1958)
11. "La Pistola Y El Corazon" – Los Lobos (1988)
12. "Big Nothing" – The MacManus Gang (1987)
13. "Pistol Packin' Mama" – Al Dexter & His Troopers (1943)
14. "Pistol Packin' Mama" – The Hurricanes (1955)
15. "The Big Guns" – Jenny Lewis & The Watson Twins (2006)
16. "Great Long Pistol" – Jerry Irby & His Texas Rangers (1948)
17. "Don't Shoot Baby" – Vernon Green & The Medallions (1955)
18. "Shoot Out The Lights" – Richard & Linda Thompson (1982)

=== Episode 26: Halloween ===
First aired on October 25, 2006.

Steven Wright introduces this episode in lieu of Ellen Barkin.

1. "Born Under A Bad Sign" – Albert King (1967)
2. "Black Cat" – Tommy Collins (1960)
3. "Castin' My Spell" – Johnny Otis (1959)
4. "Beware Of The Vampire" – Denzel Laing (1978)
5. "I Put a Spell on You" – Screamin' Jay Hawkins (1956)
6. "Skeleton In The Closet" – Nat Gonella & His Georgians (1937)
7. "Look Out There's A Monster Coming" – Bonzo Dog Doo-Dah Band (1967)
8. "Hoo-Doo Say" – The Sly Fox (1954)
9. "Superstition" – Stevie Wonder (1972)
10. "Morgus The Magnificent" – Morgus & The 3 Ghouls (Frankie Ford and Mac Rebennack) (1959)
11. "That Old Black Magic" – Louis Prima & Keely Smith (1958)
12. "Mr. Ghost Goes To Town" – Zeke Manners & His Swing Billies (1936)
13. "Zombie Jamboree" – The Charmer (1953)
14. "Monster Mash" – Bobby 'Boris' Pickett and the Crypt-Kickers (1962)
15. "Dead" – The Poets (1961)
16. "Ding-Dong! The Witch Is Dead" – June Christy (1960)

=== Episode 27: Dance ===
First aired on November 1, 2006.

1. "Dancing in the Street" – Martha and the Vandellas (1964)
2. "Let's Go Dancing" – Roy Hogsed and His Rainbow Riders Trio (1947)
3. "Do You Wanna Dance" – Ramones (1977)
4. "Let Her Dance" – The Bobby Fuller Four (1965)
5. "Ten Cents a Dance" – Anita O'Day with Billy May Orchestra (1960)
6. "My Baby Don't Dance To Nothin' But Ernest Tubb" – Junior Brown (1993)
7. "Dance The Slurp" – 7-Eleven (1967)
8. "Dance Dance Dance" – The LeBron Brothers (1967)
9. "When You Dance" – The Turbans (1955)
10. "Dancing Mood" – Delroy Wilson (1966)
11. "The Girl Can't Dance" – Bunker Hill and The Raymen (1963)
12. "I Won't Dance" – Fred Astaire (1955)
13. "I Can't Dance (I've Got Ants In My Pants)" – Roy Newman and His Boys (1935)
14. "Let's Dance" – Chris Montez (1962)
15. "Dancing To The Rhythm Of A Rock 'n' Roll Band" – Eddie Seacrist and The Rolling Rockets (195?)
16. "Dance Dance Dance" – Bill Parsons (Bobby Bare) (1959)
17. "I Can't Stop Dancing" – Archie Bell and The Drells (1968)
18. "Save the Last Dance for Me" – Buck Owens (1962)

=== Episode 28: Sleep ===
First aired on November 8, 2006.

1. "Sleep Walk" – Santo & Johnny (1959)
2. "A Man's Best Friend Is A Bed" – Louis Jordan & His Tympany Five (1947)
3. "Sleeping In The Ground" – Sammy Myers (1956)
4. "Somebody's Been Sleeping In My Bed" – 100 Proof (Aged In Soul) (1970)
5. "I Walk In My Sleep" – Berna-Dean (1961)
6. "Two Sleepy People" – Hoagy Carmichael (1957)
7. "I Heard You Crying In Your Sleep" – George Jones (1966)
8. "Sleepless" – Peter Wolf (2002)
9. "Another Sleepless Night" – Belton Richard (1964)
10. "Rock Me To Sleep" – Little Miss Cornshucks (1947)
11. "Love Is Only Sleeping" – The Monkees (1967)
12. "Sleep" – Little Willie John (1960)
13. "Endless Sleep" – Jody Reynolds and The Storms (1958)
14. "Sleeping" – (Richard Manuel & ) The Band (1970)
15. "When It's Sleepy Time Down South" – Louis Armstrong (1956)

=== Episode 29: Food ===
Aired November 15, 2006

1. "Delicious (The Laughing Song)".... – Jim Backus And Friend (1958)
2. "Everybody Eats When They Come To My House" – Cab Calloway (1947)
3. "Wake Up In The Morning (Rice Krispies Jingle)" – The Rolling Stones (1963)
4. "Bar-B-Q" – Wendy Rene (1964)
5. "Hot Biscuits And Sweet Marie" – Lincoln Chase (1961)
6. "Goodbye Pork Pie Hat" – Charles Mingus (1959)
7. "Eat That Chicken" – Charles Mingus (1961)
8. "Hamburger Hop" – Johnny Hicks and His Troubadours (1950)
9. "Swing And Dine" – The Melodians (1968)
10. "Purple Stew" – Thurston Harris and The Lamplighters (1958)
11. "Shortnin' Bread" – Paul Chaplain & His Emeralds (1960)
12. "Matzoh Balls" – Slim Gaillard & His Flat Foot Floogie Boys (1939)
13. "I Heard The Voice Of A Pork Chop" – Jim Jackson (1928)
14. "Hey Pete! Let's Eat More Meat" – Dizzy Gillespie (1946)
15. "Hungry Man" – Louis Jordan & His Tympany Five (1947)
16. "Saturday Night Fish Fry" – The Blue Dots (1957)
17. "The Hamburger Song" – Bobby Moore & the Rhythm Aces (1966)
18. "Hot Dog (Watch Me Eat)" – The Detroit Cobras (2005)
19. "I Like Pie, I Like Cake" – The Four Clefs (1941)

=== Episode 30: Thanksgiving Leftovers ===
Aired November 22, 2006

1. "Turkey in the Straw" – Liberace (1952)
2. "Hallelujah, I'm a Bum" – Harry McClintock (1926)
3. "Let Me Play with Your Poodle" – Tampa Red & Big Maceo (1942)
4. "Yard Dog" – Al Ferrier (1972)
5. "The Turkey Hop" – The Robins with Johnny Otis Orchestra (1950)
6. "Honeysuckle Rose" – Fats Waller (1934)
7. "Twelve Red Roses" – Betty Harris (1966)
8. "Don't Let the Stars Get in Your Eyes" – Skeets McDonald (1952)
9. "Them There Eyes" – Billie Holiday (1939)
10. "Angel Eyes" – Jesse Belvin (1959)
11. "Gunslingers" – Mighty Sparrow (1963)
12. "Let's Be Friends" – Billy Wright (1955)
13. "Whiskey Is The Devil (In Liquid Form)" – The Bailes Brothers (1947)
14. "Teach Me Tonight" – Dinah Washington (1954)
15. "Teacher Teacher" – Rockpile (1980)
16. "Iodine In My Coffee" – Muddy Waters (1952)
17. "You Eat Too Much" – Harold Burrage (1956)
18. "Pie In The Sky" – Cisco Houston (1960)

=== Episode 31: Tennessee ===
Aired November 29, 2006

1. "Good Night Cincinnati, Good Morning Tennessee" – Shorty Long (1951)
2. "Memphis, Tennessee" – Chuck Berry (1959)
3. "Memphis In The Meantime" – John Hiatt (1987)
4. "Tennessee Whiskey" – David Allan Coe (1981)
5. "Memphis Slim U.S.A. – Memphis Slim (1961)
6. "Tennessee Waltz" – Sam Cooke (1964)
7. "Nashville Cats" – Lovin' Spoonful (1966)
8. "Tennessee Border" – Hank Williams Sr (1949)
9. "Tennessee" – Arrested Development (1992)
10. "The Memphis Train" – Rufus Thomas (1968)
11. "Night Train To Memphis" – Jerry Lee Lewis (1959)
12. "Hey, Memphis" – LaVern Baker (1961)
13. "Trucker From Tennessee" – Link Davis (1956)
14. "All the Way from Memphis" – Mott the Hoople (1973)
15. "Memphis Soul Stew" – King Curtis (1967)
16. "Tennessee" – Carl Perkins (1956)

=== Episode 32: Moon ===
Aired December 6, 2006

1. "Moonlight Sonata" – original by Ludwig van Beethoven
2. "Ornithology" – Charlie Parker (1951)
3. "How High the Moon" – Les Paul and Mary Ford (1951)
4. "Havana Moon" – Chuck Berry (1957)
5. "Kiko And The Lavender Moon" – Los Lobos (1992)
6. "By The Light Of The Silvery Moon" – Fats Waller (1942)
7. "Blue Moon of Kentucky" – Bill Monroe (1947)
8. "Mister Moonlight" – Piano Red (1961)
9. "Moonlight in Vermont" – Louis Armstrong and Ella Fitzgerald (1956)
10. "It's Only a Paper Moon" – Big Dee Irwin (1964)
11. "Blue Moon On The Bayou" – Red Le Blanc & His Crescent Boys (1962)
12. "Yellow Moon" – The Neville Brothers (1989)
13. "When My Blue Moon Turns to Gold Again" – Cliffie Stone (1948)
14. "Destination Moon" – Dinah Washington (1962)
15. "There's a Moon Out Tonight" – The Capris (1960)
16. "Fly Me to the Moon" – Bobby Womack (1969)
17. "C Jam Blues" – Slim Gaillard (1946)
18. "How High the Moon" – Slim Gaillard (1958)
19. "Moon River" – Henry Mancini (1961)

=== Episode 33: Countdown ===
Aired December 13, 2006

1. "Four On Six" – Wes Montgomery (1960)
2. "Ten Commandments (From Man To Woman)" – Prince Buster (1967)
3. "Revolution 9" – The Beatles (1968)
4. "Nine Below Zero" – Sonny Boy Williamson II (1951)
5. "Eight Men, Four Women" – O. V. Wright (1967)
6. "Seven Nation Army" – The White Stripes (2003)
7. "Seven Nights to Rock" – Moon Mullican (1956)
8. "I Got Six" – Bob Dorough (1973)
9. "Six Pack To Go" – Hank Thompson & His Brazos Valley Boys (1960)
10. "5-4-3-2-1" – Manfred Mann (1964)
11. "Five Long Years" – Eddie Boyd (1951)
12. "I've Got Four Big Brothers (To Look After Me)" – Maddox Brothers and Rose (1947)
13. "3 x 7 = 21" – Jewel King (1949)
14. "We Three (My Echo, My Shadow and Me)" – The Ink Spots (1940)
15. "It Takes Two" – Marvin Gaye & Kim Weston (1966)
16. "Tea For Two" – Joe Mooney Quartet (1946)
17. "One Irish Rover" – Van Morrison (1986)
18. "One Love" – Bob Marley & The Wailers (1977)
19. "Zero Willpower" – Irma Thomas (1979)

=== Episode 34: Christmas & New Year ===
Aired December 20, 2006. 2 hour-long special.

1. "Swinging For Christmas (Boppin' For Santa)" – Tom Archia (1948)
2. "Christmas Is A-Coming (Chicken Crowns At Midnight)" – Lead Belly (194 ?)
3. "A Party For Santa" – Lord Nelson (1963)
4. "Sock It To Me Santa" – Bob Seger & The Last Heard (1966)
5. "Who Took The Merry Out Of Christmas" – The Staple Singers (1970)
6. "Please Come Home for Christmas" – Charles Brown (1960)
7. "Jingle Bells" – Johnny Paycheck (1967)
8. "It Must Be Christmas" – Gerry Mulligan & Judy Holliday (1980)
9. "Christmas Morning" – Titus Turner (1952)
10. "Poor Old Rudolph" – The BellRays (2001)
11. "Blue Xmas" – Bob Dorough & Miles Davis (1962)
12. "Far Away Christmas Blues" – Little Esther with Johnny Otis Orchestra (1950)
13. "Beatnik's Wish" – Patsy Raye & The Beatniks (1959)
14. "Don't Believe In Christmas" – The Sonics (1965)
15. "Christmas Tree" – King Stitt (1969)
16. "Silent Night" – Huey "Piano" Smith & the Clowns (1962)
17. "Must Be Santa" – Brave Combo (1991)
18. "Mambo Santa Mambo" – The Enchanters (1957)
19. "Fiesta De Navidad" – Celia Cruz Y La Sonora Matancera (1961)
20. "Merry Christmas Darling" – Hop Wilson & His Buddies (1960)
21. "Merry Merry Christmas" – Alton Ellis & The Lipsticks (1972)
22. "The Merriest" – June Christy (1961)
23. "Truckin' Trees For Christmas" – Red Simpson (1973)
24. "Christmas In Jail" – The Youngsters (1956)
25. "I Want A Casting Couch For Christmas" – Kay Martin & Her Body Guards (1962)
26. "Santa Claus" – Sonny Boy Williamson II (1960)
27. "Hello Mr New Year" – Cool Breezers (1958)
28. "Happy Christmas, Happy New Year" – Mabel Mafuya (1958)
29. "Christmas To New Years" – The Larks (1951)
30. "What Are You Doing New Year's Eve?" – Nancy Wilson (1965)
31. "Auld Lang Syne" – traditional

=== Episode 35: Women's Names ===
Aired January 3, 2007

1. "Laura" – Charlie Parker (1955)
2. "Anna (Go to Him)" – Arthur Alexander (1962)
3. "Peggy Sue" – Buddy Holly & The Crickets (1957)
4. "Lola" – The Kinks (1970)
5. "Gloria" – Them (1965)
6. "Safronia B" – Calvin Boze (1950)
7. "Louise" – Howlin' Wolf (1964)
8. "Sally Go 'Round the Roses" – The Jaynetts (1963)
9. "Corrine Corrina" – Bob Wills & His Texas Playboys (1940)
10. "Mandy Is Two" – Billie Holiday & Her Orchestra (1942)
11. "Little Maggie" – The Stanley Brothers (1946)
12. "Pretty Polly" – Sandy Denny (1967)
13. "Zindy Lou" – The Chimes (1955)
14. "Claudette (demo)" – Roy Orbison (1957)
15. "Nancy (With the Laughing Face)" – Frank Sinatra (1945)
16. "Mona" – Bo Diddley (1957)
17. "Sweet Jennie Lou" – Gene Ammons (1950)

=== Episode 36: Hair ===
Aired January 10, 2007

1. "Sally, Let Your Bangs Hang Down" – Bill Carlisle (193?)
2. "Bangs" – They Might Be Giants (2001)
3. "Gentlemen Prefer Blondes" – Eddie Noack (1949)
4. "Bald-headed Lena" – Piano Red (1962)
5. "Red Headed Woman" – Sonny Burgess (1956)
6. "Don't Touch My Head" – J. B. Lenoir (1956)
7. "Bright Lights And Blonde Haired Women" – Ray Price (1962)
8. "Bald Head" – Professor Longhair (1950)
9. "How You Gonna Get Respect (When You Haven't Cut Your Process Yet)" – Hank Ballard (1968)
10. "Don't Mess With My Ducktail" – Joe Clay (1956)
11. "(You Dyed Your Hair) Chartreuse" – Louis Jordan & His Tympany Five (1950)
12. "Baby's Got A Brand New Hairdo" – Elvis Costello & The Attractions (1986)
13. "Cleanhead Blues" – Eddie "Cleanhead" Vinson (1946)
14. "You're My Baby (demo version)" – Johnny Cash (1954)

=== Episode 37: Musical Instruments ===
Aired: January 17, 2007

1. "The Intro and the Outro" – Bonzo Dog Band (1967)
2. "(Everytime I Hear) That Mellow Saxophone" – Roy Montrell (1956)
3. "Uncle Pen" – Bill Monroe & His Bluegrass Boys (1950)
4. "Big Guitar" – Bill Watkins (1957)
5. "The Fiddler" – Nehemiah Reid (1967)
6. "Someone Stole Gabriel's Horn" – Henry "Red" Allen (1932)
7. "When Yuba Plays The Rumba On The Tuba" – Johnny Mercer (1938)
8. "Hillbilly Drummer Girl" – The Young Fresh Fellows (1991)
9. "Fiddle Diddle Boogie" – Davis Sisters (1955)
10. "Big Long Slidin' Thing" – Dinah Washington (1954)
11. "Hey Harmonica Man" – Stevie Wonder (1964)
12. "Different Drum" – Stone Poneys feat. Linda Ronstadt (1967)
13. "Round Hole Guitar" – Don Rich & The Buckaroos (1967)
14. "Trombone Cholly" – Bessie Smith & Her Blue Boys (1927)
15. "The Piano Has Been Drinking (Not Me)" – Tom Waits (1976)
16. "Crazy 'Bout A Saxophone" – Buddy Johnson & His Orchestra (1954)

=== Episode 38: Luck ===
Aired: January 24, 2007

1. "Happy-Go-Lucky-Me" – Paul Evans (1960)
2. "Bad Luck Blues" – Blind Lemon Jefferson (1926)
3. "Bad Luck Soul" – B.B. King (1960)
4. "Bad Luck Come My Way" – Eddie Dugosh & The Ah-Ha Playboys (1956)
5. "Lucky Seven" – The Skatalites (1965)
6. "Alright, Okay, You Win!" – Buddy & Ella Johnson (1955)
7. "The Same Thing Could Happen To You" – Lazy Lester (1965)
8. "I'm Just a Lucky So and So" – Annie Ross & Zoot Sims (1959)
9. "You Can't Be Lucky All The Time" – Roosevelt Sykes (1955)
10. "Take It Away Lucky" – Eddie Noack (1954)
11. "Bad Luck Blues" – Guitar Slim (1953)
12. "Wheel Of Fortune" – Kay Starr (1952)
13. "If I Lose" – The Stanley Brothers (1958)
14. "Mr. Hard Luck" – The Orbits (1957)
15. "You Win, I Lose" – Little Johnny Taylor (1964)
16. "Three Cheers For The Loser" – Wynn Stewart (1962)
17. "Here's To The Losers" – Frank Sinatra (1961)

=== Episode 39: Tears ===
Aired January 31, 2007

1. "The Inflated Tear" – Roland Kirk (1968)
2. "96 Tears" – ? and the Mysterians (1966)
3. "And Her Tears Flowed Like Wine" – Anita O'Day (1944)
4. "Big Boys Cry" – Bobby Charles (1963)
5. "Cry to Me" – Solomon Burke (1961)
6. "I'm So Lonesome I Could Cry" – Hank Williams Sr (1949)
7. "Cry Me A River" – Julie London (1955)
8. "I Sat And Cried" – Jimmy Nelson (1961)
9. "No More Tear-Stained Makeup" – The Marvelettes (1970)
10. "Tears A Go-Go" – Charlie Rich (1966)
11. "Cry One More Time" – The J. Geils Band (1971)
12. "Laughing But Crying" – Roy Brown (1953)
13. "The Bells" – Billy Ward and his Dominoes (1953)
14. "Cry Tough" – Alton Ellis & The Flames (1966)
15. "I'll Drown In My Own Tears" – Lula Reed (1951)
16. "Everybody's Cryin' Mercy" – Mose Allison (1968)

=== Episode 40: Laughter ===
Aired February 7, 2007

1. "Laughing In Rhythm" – Slim Gaillard (1938)
2. "Laughin' And Jokin'" – Ernie Chaffin (1957)
3. "Everyone's Laughing" – Clyde McPhatter & The Drifters (1955)
4. "Don't Laugh" – The Louvin Brothers (1957)
5. "After My Laughter Came Tears" – Big Joe Turner (1951)
6. "Lose Your Blues And Laugh At Life" – Jimmie Revard & His Oklahoma Playboys (1937)
7. "The Last Laugh" – Mark Knopfler & Van Morrison (2000)
8. "After The Laughter" – Gene Chandler (1967)
9. "Laugh at Me" – Sonny Bono (1965)
10. "I'm Laughing At You" – The Gardenias (1957)
11. "When I Laugh" – Toots & The Maytals (1965)
12. "I've Got The Last Laugh Now" – Roy Brown (1951)
13. "They All Laughed" – Chris Connor (1957)
14. "Living A Little, Laughing A Little" – The Spinners (1974)

=== Episode 41: Heart ===
Aired February 14, 2007

1. "Home In Your Heart" – Solomon Burke (1963)
2. "Keys To Your Heart" – The 101ers (1976)
3. "Good Morning Heartache" – Billie Holiday (1946)
4. "He Will Break Your Heart" – Jerry Butler (1960)
5. "Brand New Heartache" – The Everly Brothers (1958)
6. "Melt Your Heart" – Jenny Lewis with The Watson Twins (2006)
7. "That's When Your Heartaches Begin" – The Million Dollar Quartet feat. Elvis Presley (1956)
8. "That's When Your Heartaches Begin" – Billy Bunn & His Buddies (1952)
9. "Secret Heart" – Ron Sexsmith (1995)
10. "Directly From My Heart" – Little Richard (1956)
11. "Ruler Of My Heart" – Irma Thomas (1962)
12. "(Straight To Your Heart) Like A Cannonball" – Van Morrison (1971)
13. "Hearts of Stone" – The Jewels (1954)
14. "Piece of My Heart" – Erma Franklin (1967)
15. "Heart Full of Soul" – The Yardbirds (1965)
16. "Zing! Went the Strings of My Heart" – The Coasters (1958)

=== Episode 42: Shoes ===
Aired February 21, 2007

1. "My Little Suede Shoes" – Charlie Parker (1948)
2. "Blue Suede Shoes" – Carl Perkins (1956)
3. "Hi-Heel Sneakers" – Tommy Tucker (1964)
4. "Gallenkamp Shoe Commercial" – The Bobby Fuller Four (1965)
5. "Walk a Mile in My Shoes" – Joe South & The Believers (1970)
6. "Take Your Shoes Off Baby" – Dinah Washington (1962)
7. "Charlie's Shoes" – Billy Walker (musician) (1962)
8. "I've Got Sand In My Shoes" – The Drifters (1964)
9. "Shine" – Louis Armstrong & His New Sebastian Cotton Club Orchestra (1931)
10. "Chattanooga Shoe Shine Boy" – Red Foley (1950)
11. "Get Rhythm" – NRBQ (1978)
12. "Paper In My Shoe" – Boozoo Chavis (1954)
13. "Running Shoes" – Juke Boy Bonner (1968)
14. "My Adidas" – Run-D.M.C. (1986)
15. "Hang Up My Rock And Roll Shoes" – Chuck Willis (1958)
16. "Barefootin'" – Robert Parker (1966)

=== Episode 43: Colors ===
Aired February 28, 2007

1. "Over The Rainbow" – Judy Garland (1939)
2. "The House Of Blue Lights" – Ella Mae Morse (1946)
3. "Pink Champagne" – Joe Liggins & His Honeydrippers (1945)
4. "Long Black Veil" – Lefty Frizzell (1959)
5. "Baby's in Black" – The Beatles (1964)
6. "Red Cadillac & A Black Moustache" – Warren Smith (1957)
7. "Deep Purple" – The Ravens (1949)
8. "Blue Days, Black Nights" – Bob Luman (1957)
9. "Blue And Orange Birds And Silver Bells" – Della Reese (1954)
10. "Self-Portrait In Three Colors" – Charles Mingus (1959)
11. "The Little White Cloud That Cried" – Johnnie Ray (1951)
12. "Little Green" – Joni Mitchell (1971)
13. "Orange Colored Sky" – Nat King Cole (1950)
14. "Big Blue Diamonds" – Clint West (1965)
15. "Blue Skies" – Count Basie & Jimmy Rushing (1946)
16. "Pink Cadillac" – Sammy Masters (1956)
17. "Yellow Bird" – Arthur Lyman (1961)
18. "Yellow Coat" – Screamin' Jay Hawkins (1958)
19. "Purple Haze" – The Jimi Hendrix Experience (1967)

=== Episode 44: Texas ===
Aired March 7, 2007

1. "The Eyes Of Texas Are Upon You" – Milton Brown and His Musical Brownies
2. "Drifting Texas Sand" – Webb Pierce (1951)
3. "Deep in the Heart of Texas" – Andy Anderson & The Dawnbreakers (1960)
4. "The Girls From Texas" – Jimmy Lewis (1967)
5. "Carter Family And Jimmie Rodgers In Texas" – Jimmie Rodgers & The Carter Family (1931)
6. "Ay Te Dejo En San Antonio" – Don Santiago Jimenez Sr. (1937)
7. "I Got Texas In My Soul" – Tex Williams & the Western Caravan (1946)
8. "Texas Flood" – Larry Davis (1958)
9. "Blue Yodel No. 1 (T for Texas)" – Bob Downen (195?)
10. "Across the Alley from the Alamo" – June Christy with Stan Kenton & His Orchestra (1947)
11. "Under A Texas Moon" – King Nawahi Hawaiians (1930)
12. "All That Oil In Texas" – Oscar McLollie & His Honey Jumpers (1953)
13. "Texas Me" – Sir Douglas Quintet (1969)
14. "Waltz Across Texas" – Ernest Tubb & His Texas Troubadours (1965)
15. "The Assassination" – The Dixie Nightingales (1965)
16. "Paris, Texas" – Ry Cooder (1984)
17. "Across The Borderline" – Freddy Fender w/ Ry Cooder (1982)

=== Episode 45: Trains ===
Aired March 14, 2007

1. "Blue Train" – John Coltrane (1957)
2. "Honky Tonk Train Blues" – Meade Lux Lewis (1927)
3. "Lonesome Train (On A Lonesome Track)" – The Johnny Burnette Rock 'n' Roll Trio (1957)
4. "Mystery Train" – Little Junior Parker (1953)
5. "I'm Gonna Murder My Baby" – Pat Hare (1954)
6. "Waiting for a Train" – Jimmie Rodgers (1929)
7. "Draw Your Brakes" – Scotty (1971)
8. "Train in Vain" – The Clash (1979)
9. "Night Train" – Jimmy Forrest (1951)
10. "Freight Train Boogie" – The Delmore Brothers (1946)
11. "Lonesome Whistle Blues" – Freddie King (1961)
12. "Mule Train" – Frankie Lane (1949)
13. "The Train" – Lord Buckley (1970)
14. "The Train Kept A-Rollin'" – Tiny Bradshaw (1951)
15. "Last Train to Clarksville" – The Monkees (1966)
16. "Midnight Special" – Lead Belly (1940)
17. "Yonder Comes A Freight Train" – Laura Cantrell (2002)
18. "Casey Jones" – The Jubalaires (1944)
19. "Casey Jones" – The Grateful Dead (1970)
20. "Still A Fool (Two Trains Running)" – Muddy Waters (1951)

=== Episode 46: More Trains ===
Aired March 21, 2007

1. "Railroading" – Jimmy Bryant and Speedy West (1951)
2. "People Get Ready" – Curtis Mayfield & The Impressions (1965)
3. "Mean Old Train" – Papa Lightfoot (1954)
4. "Click Clack" – Captain Beefheart & the Magic Band (1972)
5. "Blues in the Night" – Jimmy Lunceford (1941)
6. "The Underground Train" – Lord Kitchener (1950)
7. "This Train" – Sister Rosetta Tharpe (1947)
8. "Train of Love" – Johnny Cash (1957)
9. "All Aboard" – Muddy Waters (1956)
10. "That Train Don't Stop Here" – Los Lobos (1992)
11. "The Loco-Motion" – Little Eva (1962)
12. "2:19 Blues" – Louis Armstrong (1940)
13. "Mr. Engineer" – Jimmy Martin and the Sunny Mountain Boys (1976)
14. "Gone Dead Train" – Randy Newman (1970)
15. "Kassie Jones" – Furry Lewis (1928)
16. "Love Train" – The O'Jays (1973)

=== Episode 47: Fools ===
Aired March 28, 2007

1. "These Foolish Things" – ?
2. "Chain Of Fools" – Aretha Franklin (1967)
3. "I'm No Fool" – Jiminy Cricket (1955)
4. "(Now And Then There's) A Fool Such As I" – Hank Snow (1952)
5. "Three Times A Fool" – Otis Rush with Willie Dixon's Orchestra (1958)
6. "The Fool" – Sanford Clark (1956)
7. "Fool, Fool, Fool" – The Clovers (1951)
8. "A Fool No More" – Eddie Hope & Manish Boys (1956)
9. "Fools Rush In (Where Angels Fear to Tread)" – Sonny Stitt (1965)
10. "A Fool in Love" – Ike and Tina Turner (1960)
11. "Love's Made a Fool of You" – The Crickets (1959)
12. "Love Is All Around" – Hüsker Dü (1985)
13. "Fools Fall in Love" – The Drifters (1957)
14. "I Pity the Fool" – Bobby "Blue" Bland (1961)
15. "Just Your Fool" – Little Walter (1960)
16. "I'm A Fool For You" – James Carr & Betty Harris (1967)
17. "Guitar Pickin' Fool" – Teddy Humphries (1959)
18. "Why Do Fools Fall In Love" – Frankie Lymon & The Teenagers (1956)
19. "Who Will The Next Fool Be" – Charlie Rich

=== Episode 48: New York ===
Aired April 4, 2007

1. "Take the "A" Train" – Duke Ellington (1941)
2. "Going To New York" – Jimmy Reed (1959)
3. "Funky Broadway" – Dyke and the Blazers (1966)
4. "Dirty Blvd." – Lou Reed (1989)
5. "New York's My Home" – Ray Charles (1960)
6. "New York Mambo" – Johnny Colon (1971)
7. "I Guess the Lord Must Be in New York City" – Harry Nilsson (1969)
8. "Across 110th Street" – Bobby Womack and Peace (1972)
9. "Boys In The City" – NRBQ (1972)
10. "Let Me Off Uptown" – Anita O'Day & Roy Eldridge (1941)
11. "Down and Out in New York City" – James Brown (1973)
12. "Bowery" – Moondog (1954)
13. "No Sleep till Brooklyn" – Beastie Boys (1986)
14. "Broadway" – Hank Ballard & The Midnighters (1962)
15. "Manhattan" – Dinah Washington (1959)

=== Episode 49: Death & Taxes ===
Aired April 11, 2007

1. "Money's Getting Cheaper" – Jimmy Witherspoon (1963)
2. "I Paid My Income Tax Today" – Gene Autry (1942)
3. "Sunny Afternoon" – The Kinks (1966)
4. "Taxman" – The Beatles (1966)
5. "Taxation" – Prince Buster And All Stars (1968)
6. "Taxes, Taxes" – Hank Penny (1950)
7. "Eisenhower Blues" – J. B. Lenoir (1954)
8. "Tax Paying Blues" – J. B. Lenoir (1954)
9. "Sales Tax On The Women" – The New Lost City Ramblers (1959)
10. "Fixin' to Die Blues" – Bukka White (1940)
11. "Dead!" – Carolyn Sullivan (1967)
12. "I'll Be Glad When You're Dead, You Rascal You" – Milton Brown & The Musical Brownies (1933)
13. "I'll Be Glad When You're Dead, You Rascal You" – Louis Armstrong with Louis Jordan (1951)
14. "Freddie's Dead" – Curtis Mayfield (1972)
15. "Rock 'n' Roll Suicide" – David Bowie (1972)
16. "O Death" – The Stanley Brothers (1964)
17. "Withered And Died" – Richard and Linda Thompson (1974)
18. "The Streetbeater (Sanford & Son Theme)" – Quincy Jones (1973)

=== Episode 50: Spring Cleaning ===
Aired April 18, 2007. 2-hour long special.

1. "Spring Can Really Hang You Up The Most" – Betty Carter (1964)
2. "Be My Guest" – Fats Domino (1959)
3. "You Need A Friend" – Memphis Minnie (1941)
4. "Crying" – Roy Orbison (1961)
5. "I Cried" – Cookie and his Cupcakes (1954)
6. "Cry Baby" – Garnet Mimms and the Enchanters (1963)
7. "Teardrops from My Eyes" – Ruth Brown (1950)
8. "Rose Garden" – Joe South (1968)
9. "The Rite of Spring" – Igor Stravinsky (1913)
10. "(The Angels Wanna Wear My) Red Shoes" – Elvis Costello (1977)
11. "Little Sister Throw Your Red Shoes Away" – Vernon Oxford (1965)
12. "Dust My Broom" – Elmore James (1952)
13. "Fools Are Getting Scarcer" – Roy Milton & The Solid Senders (1955)
14. "Everybody Plays the Fool" – The Main Ingredient (1972)
15. "Spring Cleaning" – Fats Waller (1937)
16. "Detroit City" – Bobby Bare (1963)
17. "Bad, Bad Whiskey" – Amos Milburn (1950)
18. "Waitin' in Your Welfare Line" – Buck Owens (1966)
19. "Richest Guy In The Graveyard" – Dinah Washington (1949)
20. "Skid Row Joe" – Porter Wagoner (1966)
21. "Spring Is Here" – The Latin Jazz Quintet with Eric Dolphy (1960)
22. "I Ain't Superstitious" – Howlin' Wolf (1962)
23. "Take The Devil Out Of Me" – George Jones (1957)
24. "Springtime for Hitler" – The Producers (1968)
25. "Sales Tax" – Mississippi Sheiks (1934)
26. "Live Fast, Love Hard, Die Young" – Faron Young (1955)
27. "Brother, Drop Dead" – Tex Williams & His Western Caravan (1948)
28. "Fannie Mae" – Buster Brown (1957)
29. "Heart" – Rockpile (1980)
30. "Crazy Heart" – Hank Williams (1951)
31. "Put a Little Love in Your Heart" – Jackie DeShannon (1969)
32. "House Cleaning" – The Spaniels (1953)
33. "You Can Never Hold Back Spring" – Tom Waits (2005)
