= Motherfucker =

English-language vulgarism

- vulgarism
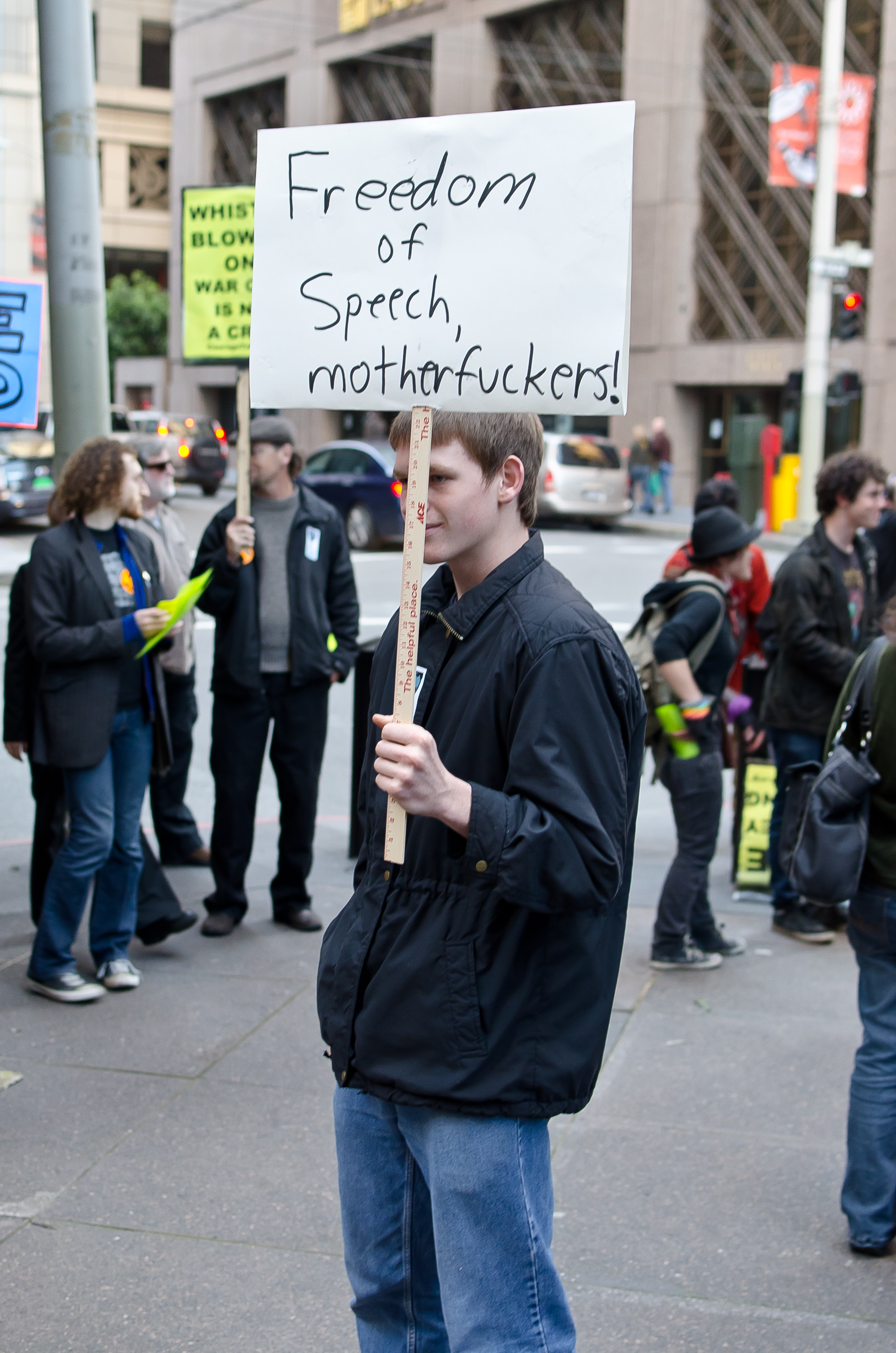
- Freedom of speech sign that uses the term held by a demonstrator at a protest in San Francisco, California in 2011
- Part of speech: Compound noun
- Pronunciation: US: /ˈmʌðərfʌkər/ UK: /ˈmʌðəˌfʌkə/
- Etymology: Compound of the terms mother and fucker

Definition
- In a literal sense: A person who has intercourse with a mother
- Figuratively: A person who is mean, despicable, vicious, or formidable; or any particularly difficult or frustrating situation

Motherfucker (US: /ˈmʌðərfʌkər/; UK: /ˈmʌðəˌfʌkə/), sometimes abbreviated as mofo, mf, or mf'er, or just simply mfer, is an English-language vulgarism. It is a form of the profanity fuck. In common usage, it is rarely used to refer to one person having intercourse with a mother. Rather, the word usually refers to a mean, despicable, or vicious person; or any particularly difficult or frustrating situation. Conversely, it can be used positively, as a term of admiration, as in the term badass motherfucker (BAMF), meaning a fearless and confident person.

== Variants ==
Like many widely used offensive terms, motherfucker has a large list of minced oaths. Motherhumper, motherfugger, mother f'er, mothersucker, mothertrucker, motherfreaker, motherlover, mofo, fothermucker, motherflower, mother flipper, motherkisser, motherfricker, and many more are sometimes used in polite company or to avoid censorship. The participle motherfucking is often used as an emphatic, in the same way as the less strong fucking. The verb to motherfuck also exists, although it is less common. Conversely, when paired with an adjective, it can become a term denoting such things as originality and masculinity, as in the related phrase "badass motherfucker." Use of the term as a compliment is frequent in the jazz community; for example, when Miles Davis addressed his future percussionist Mino Cinelu: "Miles...grabbed his arm and said, 'You're a motherfucker.' Cinelu thanked Miles for the compliment."

== History and popular culture ==
The word dates back at least to the late 19th century. In a 1889 Texas murder case, a witness testified that the victim had called the defendant a "God damned mother-f—king, bastardly son-of-a-bitch" shortly before his death. A later Texas court opinion from 1897 prints the word "mother-fucking" in full. In 1917 a U.S. soldier called his draft board "You low-down Mother Fuckers" in a letter.

In literature, Norman Mailer uses the word motherfugger in his 1948 novel The Naked and the Dead, and used it in full in his 1967 novel Why Are We in Vietnam?. It appears twice in James Purdy's 1956 novella 63: Dream Palace. In Kurt Vonnegut's novel Slaughterhouse-Five the word is used by one of the soldiers in the story – leading to the novel being often challenged in libraries and schools. Vonnegut joked in a speech, published in the collection Fates Worse Than Death, that "Ever since that word was published, way back in 1969, children have been attempting to have intercourse with their mothers. When it will stop no one knows."

The words "mother for you" or "mother fuyer", as minced oaths for "motherfucker", were used in blues and R&B records from the 1930s. A few examples include Memphis Minnie's "Dirty Mother For You" (1935), Roosevelt Sykes' "Dirty Mother For You" (1936), and Dirty Red's "Mother Fuyer" (1947). The singer Stick McGhee, whose recording of "Drinking Wine Spo-Dee-O-Dee" was a hit in 1949, claimed that he had originally heard the song as "Drinking Wine, Motherfucker". Later, Johnny "Guitar" Watson had a hit in 1977 with "A Real Mother For Ya".

In popular music, the first mainstream rock release to include the word was the 1969 album Kick Out the Jams by MC5. The title track, a live recording, is introduced by vocalist Rob Tyner shouting "And right now, right now, right now it's time to kick out the jams, motherfuckers!" This was quickly pulled from stores, and an edited version was released with the words "brothers and sisters" overdubbed on the offending word. At about the same time, the Jefferson Airplane released the album Volunteers, the opening track of which, "We Can Be Together", included the line "up against the wall, motherfucker", a popular catch phrase among radical groups at the time. This attracted less attention. The word was strongly implied, but not said explicitly, in Isaac Hayes' huge 1971 hit song "Theme from Shaft". Arlo Guthrie's 1967 piece "Alice's Restaurant" used a minced version, "mother rapers." Though rarely broadcast in the US, the word has since become common in popular music, particularly in hip-hop.

The word appears in George Carlin's Seven Words You Can't Say on Television. In one HBO special, he comments that at one point, someone asked him to remove it, since, as a derivative of the word "fuck", it constituted a duplication. He later added it back, claiming that the bit's rhythm does not work without it.

The word has become something of a catchphrase for actor Samuel L. Jackson, who frequently utters the word in some films. His use of the word helped him overcome a lifelong stuttering problem.

== Literature ==
- The Compleat Motherfucker: A History of the Mother of All Dirty Words by Jim Dawson, is a history of the word in black culture and in American literature, film, comedy and music.

== See also ==
- Incest
- Maternal insult
- Grass Mud Horse (word play on Chinese equivalent)
- Mat (Russian profanity)
- Madarchod
- Seven dirty words
- Mofo
