= Hindustani profanity =

Profanity in the Hindustani language

The Hindustani language employs a large number of profanities. Idiomatic expressions, particularly profanity, are not always directly translatable into other languages, and make little sense even when they can be translated. Many English translations may not offer the full meaning of the profanity used in the context.

== Trends ==
Hindustani profanities often contain references to incest, bodily functions, religion, caste, and notions of honor. Hindustani profanities may have origins in Persian, Arabic, or Sanskrit. Hindustani profanity is used such as promoting racism, sexism, or offending someone. Hindustani slurs are extensively used in social media in Hinglish and Urdish, although use of Devanagari and Nastaliq scripts for throwing slurs is on the rise.

== Public reception ==
Although Hindustani profanities are often used colloquially, few censorship attempts have been made. The Indian Central Board of Film Certification chairman Pahlaj Nihalani reportedly sent the Producers' Association and Regional Officers a list of censored words that could not be used in films. This has sparked controversy.

== Examples ==
- Madarchod (मादरचोद, مادرچود; English – motherfucker), sometimes abbreviated as "MC", is a Hindustani language vulgarism. It is a form of the profanity "fuck". While the word is usually considered highly offensive, it is rarely used in the literal sense of one who engages in sexual activity with another person's mother, or his own mother.
- Behenchod (बहनचोद, بہن چود; English – sister fucker), also pronounced as behanchod, is sometimes abbreviated as "BC", is a Hindustani language vulgarism. It is also a form of the profanity "fuck". The word is considered highly offensive, and is rarely used in literal sense of one who engages in sexual activity with another person's sister, or his own sister.
- Randi (रंडी/रण्डी, رنڈی; English – prostitute, whore, slut), is a derogatory term for a woman who is considered to be a prostitute in the literal sense, but is usually applied as a term for women who are considered too promiscuous or flirtatious, or who dress casually. In Hindi cinema and Urdu cinema, it usually refers to a woman with multiple sexual partners. Sometimes, it is used just as an insult against a woman without any reason.
