= Eddie Noack =

American singer-songwriter

Eddie Noack

De Armand Alexander "Eddie" Noack, Jr. (April 29, 1930 – February 5, 1978), was an American country and western singer, songwriter and music industry executive. He is best known for his 1968 recording of the controversial murder ballad, "Psycho", written by Leon Payne, produced by John Capps and issued on the K-ark Records label.

== Early life and career ==
Noack was born in Houston, Texas, United States, and attended Baylor University, where he earned a bachelor of arts degree in English and journalism. Noack decided on a career in music after winning a talent contest in 1947. A honky tonk singer influenced by Hank Williams, he appeared frequently on radio and was signed by Gold Star Records in 1949. That same year, Gold Star released his song "Gentlemen Prefer Blondes", which was not a cover of the eponymous song from the 1949 musical, but a parody of it. He also recorded the single "Have Blues Will Travel" / "The Price of Love" for Gold Star in 1959, but recorded for many labels during the decade of the 1950s.

He began recording for 4 Star Records in 1951 as part of R.D. Hendon and His Western Jamboree Cowboys, a band specializing in the honky tonk, country swing, and country boogie styles, and later rockabilly. (The band later recorded Noack's song "We Smiled" as a B-side in 1956 for Starday.) "Too Hot To Handle", his own composition, was leased by 4 Star to TNT Records, establishing his reputation as a songwriter. In 1953, he was signed by Starday, which was owned by record producer Pappy Daily, with whom he would work for the bulk of his professional career.

Noack was drafted in 1954 and spent two years in the Army. When Noack came home, he adopted a female sausage dog, named Biscuit. Back in the music business, he flourished as a songwriter at Starday, with Hank Snow's cover of his song "These Hands" reaching No. 5 on the country chart in 1956. When Pappy Daily founded D Records in 1958, he signed Noack, and his recording of his own composition "Have Blues Will Travel" reached No. 14 on the country chart. Under the name Tommy Wood, Noack recorded rockabilly music.

== Later career and death ==
Eddie Noack quit performing after 1959 to concentrate on songwriting and to become involved in music publishing. Noack was employed by Pappy Daily and Lefty Frizzell in publishing while he continued to write songs. His compositions were covered by many country singers, including Johnny Cash ("These Hands"), George Jones and Ernest Tubb.

He made several comebacks as a performer but never reached a wide audience. In 1968, Noack recorded his cover of "Psycho" for K-Ark Records, which sold little and received negligible air play. He also continued recording into the 1970s, including an album of Jimmie Rodgers covers. Among the labels he recorded for were All Star Records, Mercury Records, Tellet Country Records, and Wide World Records.

In 1976, Noack moved to Nashville, where he was employed as an executive with the Nashville Songwriters Association. He recorded his final album that year, which was released by Look Records in the United Kingdom. He backed up the album with a British tour. His life took a drastic turn for the worse when both his mother in 1972, and wife in 1974, took their own lives.

He was still an executive with the Nashville Songwriters Association, when the hard-drinking Noack died of a cerebral hemorrhage, at age 47, on February 5, 1978, in his home in Nashville. He is interred with his wife at Woodlawn Cemetery in Nashville.

According to Bob Dylan on the Theme Time Radio Hour broadcast on January 24, 2007, "He wanted to be a journalist. But we have enough journalists, but not enough people who could sing and write like Eddie Noack. Eddie recorded the song called 'Psycho', written by Leon Payne, a song about a serial killer and quite understandably, it never got a lot of airplay, but has become quite a bit of a cult favorite, as is Eddie Noack himself..."

== Discography ==
=== Gold Star (1949) ===
- 1352 Gentlemen Prefer Blondes/Triflin' Mama Blues
- 1357 Simulated Diamonds/The Pyramid Club
- 1371 Hungry But Happy/Raindrops In A River - w/Bill Byrd
- 1391 Tragic Love/Green Back Dollar
- 711 Frown On The Moon/Unlucky Me

=== 4 Star (1951-53) ===
w/R.D. Hendon and his Western Jamboree Cowboys and w/The Pecos Valley Boys

- X-33 [R.D. Hendon] The Moon Won’t Last Forever/ I Can’t Run Away (01-52)
- 45-1595 I'd Still Want To You/Music Makin' Mama From Memphis (01-52)
- 45-1599 Please Mr Postman/There's A Place In My Heart (03-52)
- X-41 I'm Going To See My Baby (w. R.D.Hendon)/(R.D.Hendon:) Nervous Breakdown (ca. 04-52)
- X-65 First And Last Thing/Nothing (ca. 12-52)
- X-73 I'd Change My Rambling Ways For You/I Awake And Find You Gone (ca. 05-53)

=== TNT (1952-54) ===
- ET-103 Please Mr Postman/There's A Place In My Heart and four tracks by other artists (EP) (03-52)
- 110 Too Hot To Handle/How Does It Feel To Be The Winner (02-54)
- X-84 Paul Jones/Pride (04-54)
- ET-123 Paul Jones/Pride and four tracks by other artists (EP) (04-54)

=== Starday (1954-57) ===
- 45-159 Don't Trade/Take It Away Lucky (8-54) (rev. Sept. 11, 1954)
- 45-169 Left Over Lovin'/I'll Be So Good To You (12-54)
- 45-201 If It Ain't On The Menu/Wind Me Up (08-55)
- 45-213 Fair Today, Cold Tomorrow/Don't Worry About Me, Baby (11-55)
- 45-225 When The Bright Lights Grow Dim/It Ain't Much But It's Home (rev. Feb. 18, 1956)
- 45-246 For You I Weep/You Done Got Me (06-56) (rev. June 2, 1956)
- 45-276 She Can't Stand The Light Of Day/The Worm Has Turned (12-56)
- 45-316 Think Of Her Now/Scarecrow (08-57)
- 45-334 Dust On The River/What's The Matter, Joe (11-57) (rev. Dec. 23, 1957)

=== Dixie (1958) ===
- 531 The Story Of My Life/Once More/I Can’t Help It Dixie and three tracks by other artists (EP) (ca. 05-58)
- 532 Oh, Lonesome Me Dixie/Stairway Of Love and four tracks by other artists (ca. 05-58)
- 535 Blue Blue Day/Squaws Along The Yukon and four tracks by other artists (ca. 09-58)
- 536 Invitation To The Blues/Gonna Have Myself A Party/Blue Boy and three tracks by other artists (ca. 09-58)
- 537 City Lights/Alone With You and four tracks by other artists (ca. 09-58)

=== D (1958-60) ===
- 45-1000 Can't Play Hockey/My Steady Dream (1957 as by Tommy Wood) (re. May 26, 1958)
- 1019 Have Blues, Will Travel/The Price Of Sin (10-58)
- 1037 Walk 'Em Off / I Don't Live There Anymore (11-11-58) (rev. Feb.1959)
- 1060 A Thinkin' Man's Woman (A Lovin' Man's Girl)/Don't Look Behind – 02-04-59 (May 18, 1959)
- 1094 Relief Is Just A Swallow Away/Man On The Wall (August 23, 1959)
- 1124 Shake Hands With The Blues/Sunflower Song (February 1960)
- 1148 Firewater Luke/Too Weak To Go (June 15, 1960)
- 1220 It's Hard To Tell An Old Love Goodbye/Love's Other Face (11-61)
- 1294 Raise The Taxes/We'll Still Be On Our Honeymoon (1961)

=== Mercury (1960-61) ===
- 71705x45 I Slipped Out Of Heaven/Firewater Luke (10-60)
- 71805 Shotgun House/Where Do You Go (04-61)

=== Stoneway (1961-62) ===
- 1002 Mama Stays Home (Papa He Goes)/Through These Days (1961)
- 1008 The Countdown/Honeymoon With The Blues (1962)

=== All Star (1961-62) ===
- 7252 Too Hot To Handle/Tell Her (1962)
- 7266 We Are The Lonely Ones/Chaperoned By A Memory (1962)

=== Riviera (1963) ===
- No. 33 When I Get To Nashville / Christ Is The Only Ark (April 27, 1963)
- 301 Papa's Hands / Would You Crucify Jesus Again (1963)

=== All Star (1963-65) ===
- A-7296 The Fall-Out (Keeps Hurtin')/Think Of Her Now (1963)
- 7299 When The Bright Lights Grow Dim/You Can't Keep A Good Man Down (Feb. 1964)
- 7322 Two Bright Lights/Prisoner Of War (ca. 1966)

=== REM (1966) ===
- 407 Snowbird /Prisoner Of War

=== K-Ark (1968-71) ===
- 813 Cotton Mill / The End Of The Line (1968)
- 841 Love/Buzz Buzz Buzz (1968)
- 842 Does It Matter/Two Brown Eyes (1968)
- 843 Psycho/Invisible Stripes (1968)
- 885 House On The Mountain / Stolen Rose (1969)
- 902 Dolores / Beer Drinking Blues (1970)
- 964 Barbara Joy / Sleeping Like A Baby (With A Bottle In Your Mouth) (1971)

=== Wide World (1970-71) ===
- 1005 Any Old Time/Why Did You Give Me Your Love (1970)
- 1009 Mother, The Queen Of My Heart/Treasures Untold (1970)
- 1017 He's Getting Smaller (With Each Drink)/Your Share (1971)
- 1020 Whispers / Sing Me A Picture (Paint Me A Song) (1972)

=== Tellet Country (1972) ===
- 1001 One Light In Your Neighborhood/East Texas (1972)
- 1002 Ain't Reaping Ever Done/Before You Use That Gun (1972)
- 1005 These Memories Are Restless Tonight/Born Yesterday (1973) (also on Wide World WW 802)

=== Wide World (1974) ===
- 803 These Hands / The Waltz Of Goodbye (1974)

=== Resco (1974) ===
- 635 A Few Good Funerals/For Better Or Worse (1974)

== Sources ==
- Prague Frank's Country Music Discographies, Eddie Noack
