= King of the Blues =

Box set by B. B. King
- Released: October 1992
- Recorded: 1949–1991
- Genre: Blues
- Length: 292:29
- Label: MCA

Professional ratings
Review scores
Source	Rating
AllMusic	4.5/5 stars
Encyclopedia of Popular Music	5/5 stars
The Penguin Guide to Blues Recordings	4/4 stars

King of the Blues is a compilation album by American blues musician B. B. King covering the years 1949 through 1991. Released by MCA Records in 1992, the four CD box set includes some of King's most popular songs as well as some newer recordings.

== Track listing ==
=== Disc 1 (1949–1966) ===
1. "Miss Martha King" - (previously unreleased on U.S. LP)
2. "She's Dynamite"
3. "Three O'Clock Blues"
4. "Please Love Me"
5. "You Upset Me Baby"
6. "Every Day I Have the Blues"
7. "Rock Me Baby"
8. "Recession Blues"
9. "Don't Get Around Much Anymore" - (with Duke Ellington Orchestra)
10. "I'm Gonna Sit In 'Til You Give In"
11. "Blues at Midnight"
12. "Sneakin' Around"
13. "My Baby's Comin' Home"
14. "Slowly Losing My Mind" - (previously unreleased on LP)
15. "How Blue Can You Get" - (previously unreleased on LP)
16. "Rockin' Awhile" - (previously unreleased)
17. "Help the Poor" - (previously unreleased on LP)
18. "Stop Leadin' Me On" - (previously unreleased on LP)
19. "Never Trust a Woman" - (previously unreleased on LP)
20. "Sweet Little Angel" - (live)
21. "All Over Again"
22. "Sloppy Drunk" - (previously unreleased)
23. "Don't Answer the Door, Parts One and Two"
24. "I Done Got Wise"
25. "Think it Over"
26. "Gambler's Blues" - (live)

=== Disc 2 (1966–1969) ===
1. "Goin' Down Slow" - (live, previously unreleased)
2. "Tired of Your Jive" - (live)
3. "Sweet Sixteen, Parts One and Two" - (live, complete version previously unreleased on U.S. LP)
4. "Paying the Cost to Be the Boss"
5. "I'm Gonna Do What They Do to Me"
6. "Lucille"
7. "Watch Yourself"
8. "You Put It on Me"
9. "Get Myself Somebody" - (previously unreleased on LP)
10. "I Want You So Bad"
11. "Why I Sing the Blues"
12. "Get Off My Back Woman"
13. "Please Accept My Love" - (live)
14. "Fools Get Wise" - (previously unreleased)
15. "No Good"
16. "So Excited"

=== Disc 3 (1969–1975) ===
1. "The Thrill Is Gone"
2. "Confessin' the Blues"
3. "Nobody Loves Me But My Mother"
4. "Hummingbird" - (with Leon Russell and Joe Walsh)
5. "Ask Me No Questions" - (with Leon Russell and Joe Walsh)
6. "Chains and Things" - (with Carole King)
7. "Eyesight to the Blind" - (live in Japan, previously unreleased in U.S.)
8. "Niji Baby" - (live in Japan, previously unreleased in U.S.)
9. "Blue Shadows"
10. "Ghetto Woman" - (with Ringo Starr)
11. "Ain't Nobody Home"
12. "I Got Some Help I Don't Need" - (single edit, previously unreleased on LP)
13. "Five Long Years"
14. "To Know You Is to Love You" - (with Stevie Wonder)
15. "I Like to Live the Love"
16. "Don't Make Me Pay for His Mistakes"

=== Disc 4 (1976–1991) ===
1. "Let the Good Times Roll" - (live, with Bobby Bland)
2. "Don't You Lie to Me"
3. "Mother Fuyer"
4. "Never Make a Move Too Soon" - (with The Crusaders)
5. "When It All Comes Down (I'll Still Be Around)" - (with The Crusaders)
6. "Better Not Look Down" - (with The Crusaders)
7. "Caldonia" - (live)
8. "There Must Be a Better World Somewhere" - (with Dr. John)
9. "Play with Your Poodle" - (solo, previously unreleased)
10. "Darlin' You Know I Love You"
11. "Inflation Blues"
12. "Make Love to Me" - (rehearsal solo with piano, previously unreleased)
13. "Into the Night"
14. "Six Silver Strings"
15. "When Love Comes to Town" - (with U2, 7" mix, previously unreleased on LP)
16. "Right Place, Wrong Time" - (with Bonnie Raitt)
17. "Many Miles Travelled" - (previously unreleased)
18. "I'm Moving On"
19. "Since I Met You Baby" - (with Gary Moore)
