= Aladdin Records =

American record company and label

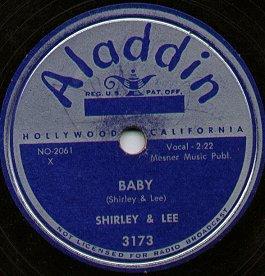
- 1952 Aladdin record
- Parent company: Universal Music Group
- Founded: 1945
- Founder: Eddie Mesner; Leo Mesner
- Defunct: 1961
- Status: Defunct
- Genre: Jazz, blues
- Country of origin: U.S.
- Location: Los Angeles, California

Aladdin Records was a record company and label founded in Los Angeles in 1945 by brothers Eddie and Leo Mesner. It was originally called Philo Records before changing its name in 1946.

== Philo Records ==
Philo's releases included 78 RPM singles of Illinois Jacquet, Wynonie Harris, Helen Humes with the Bill Doggett Octet, Jay McShann and Lester Young, and an album (set of two 78 RPM records) of Lester Young, Nat King Cole and Red Callender.

The label had legal trouble with its name when U.S. Patent Office refused to register the label's name as a trademark because of the similarity in name with the Philco radio corporation, which was a producer of the blank lacquer discs used in recording studios prior to the widespread adoption of magnetic tape. The dispute was settled when the Philo owners agreed to rename the label as "Medlee." On March 2, 1946, the company placed an advertisement in Billboard magazine, announcing the new trade name. The next week, though, they placed a new ad "correcting their mistake", announcing Aladdin Records. The numbering of the releases was continued, and older Philo releases were reprinted as Aladdin.

== Aladdin Records ==
Aladdin was known for jazz, rhythm and blues, and rock music. Some albums were released on the company's short-lived Jazz: West imprint. Aladdin Records launched several subsidiary labels such as Score (1948), Intro (1950), 7-11 (1952), Ultra (1955), Jazz: West (1955), and Lamp (1956). In addition to recording in Los Angeles, many Aladdin recordings were produced by Cosimo Matassa in New Orleans.

Aladdin's first album was by Lester Young. Other musicians on the roster included Ernie Andrews, Charles Brown, Thurston Harris, Maxwell Davis, Al Hibbler, Billie Holiday, Lynn Hope, Jimmy Liggins, Gene & Eunice, Lightnin' Hopkins, Red Nelson ("Mother Fuyer"), and Illinois Jacquet. In 1961, Aladdin was sold to Imperial Records, which was acquired by Liberty Records. Capitol Records bought Liberty in 1979 and reissues appeared on Blue Note Records.

== See also ==
- List of record labels
- Aladdin Records (UK)
