= The Farmer Boys =

American country music duo

The Farmer Boys were an American country music duo consisting of Bobby Adamson (born September 20, 1933) and Woodie Wayne Murray (September 29, 1933 – August 14, 2002).

Adamson and Murray were both natives of Arkansas who met in California when they sang a song together around a jukebox. In 1952 they started working together, singing at local dances with Adamson on lead vocals and Murray on harmony and guitar. Herb Henson gave them a spot on his television show, which broadcast out of Bakersfield, California on KERO. They eventually became nightly performers on the show, and Henson gave them the name The Farmer Boys, since they lived in Farmersville.

The Farmer Boys auditioned for MGM Records and were turned down, but Ken Nelson at Capitol Records liked them enough to sign them late in 1954, and they first recorded for Capitol on January 12, 1955. Their novelty songs became their most popular numbers, and their overall sound resembled that of Homer & Jethro. They appeared on the Grand Ole Opry and supported Webb Pierce, Hank Locklin, Carl Smith, and Elvis Presley on tour. They recorded a rockabilly single in 1956, "Cool Down Mame" b/w "My Baby Done Left Me", but soon returned to country. Roy Nichols, who played with Merle Haggard, played guitar on most of their records, and their 1957 sides featured The Desert Stars, who included Buck Owens among their members.

In 1957, their contract with Capitol expired, and they never issued another recording. They continued performing until 1964. In subsequent decades, their music has been the subject of interest by early rock and roll historians.

== Discography ==
Year	Title	Record label
1955	"You're Humdinger" / "I'm Just Too Lazy"	Capitol Records
1955	"Lend A Helpin’ Hand" / "Onions, Onions"	Capitol Records
1955	"It Pays To Advertise" / "You Lied"	Capitol Records
1956	"Flip Flop" / "Charming Betsy"	Capitol Records
1956	"My Baby Done Left Me" / "Somehow, Someway, Someday"	Capitol Records
1956	"Cool Down Mame"	Capitol Records
1957	"Flash, Crash and Thunder" / "Someone To Love"	Capitol Records
1957	"No One" / "Yearning, Burning Heart"	Capitol Records
