= Kay Martin =

American jazz musician

Kay Martin was a hotelier and ex-model, nightclub entertainer, and "party album" singer, who owned the Kay Martin Lodge in Reno, Nevada.

Born in Bakersfield, California and part Cherokee Indian, modeling saw her featured in both Adam and Playboy magazines. She then met Jess Hotchkiss and Bill Elliott, who together established a nightclub act circa 1952, billing themselves as "Kay Martin and Her Body Guards". The group later added Tony Bellson on drums. Martin was married to Hotchkiss for a time as well.

In between shows they recorded several live albums, their most popular being the 1962 Christmas album I Know What He Wants For Christmas... But I Don't Know How To Wrap It!. The songs ranged from covers of traditional songs to double entendre and jokey banter.

Martin left performing for a business life, becoming the proprietor of the Kay Martin Lodge with David Mullins in 1956.

== Selected discography ==
=== Albums ===
- "Kay Martin and Her Body Guards" (Roulette Records) 1958
- "Kay Martin At The Lorelei" (Dyna Records) 1960
- "I Know What He Wants For Christmas…But I Don't Know How to Wrap It!" (Fax Records) 1960
- "Kay Martin At Las Vegas" (Record Productions Inc.) 1962, reissued on (Laff Records) circa 1970
- "Kay Martin Sings Naughty And Nice Songs" (Record Productions Inc.) 1965 compilation

Note: "Kay Martin At Las Vegas" is a reissue of the album "Kay Martin At The Lorelei" and over the years has been re-released several times on various labels and with different covers.

=== Singles ===
- "Fever" / "The Heel" / "Summertime" / "Johnny Guitar" (Electrola Records) Germany 1958 extended play
- "Take My Love" / "Ooh La-La" (Modern Sounds Records) 1958
- "I'm Gonna Set Fire To My House" / "I've Found Peace Of Mind" (Decca Records) 1959
- "Come By Sunday" / "No More Tears To Cry" (Unart Records) 1959
- "Fever" / "The Heel" / "Summertime" / "Johnny Guitar" (Roulette Records) Netherlands 1962 extended play
