= Mofo =

Mofo may refer to:

- A minced oath of the obscenity "motherfucker"
- "Mofo" (song), from the 1997 U2 album Pop
- MONA FOMA, an Australian music and art festival
- Morrison & Foerster, a large law firm based in San Francisco, California
- Mofo the Psychic Gorilla, a magic trick in Penn & Teller's Smoke and Mirrors

== See also ==
- The MOFO Project/Object, 2006 Frank Zappa album box set
