= Ladies and Gentlemen... Mr. B.B. King =

Box set by B. B. King
- Released: October 9, 2012 (physical); October 22, 2012 (digital)
- Recorded: May 1949 – September 2007
- Genre: Blues
- Label: Universal Music Group International

Professional ratings
Review scores
Source	Rating
AllMusic	link
The Guardian	5/5 stars

Ladies and Gentlemen... Mr. B.B. King is a box set compilation album by B. B. King. It traces King's career from his first singles for Bullet Records in 1949 to material on his last recorded album in 2008. Crowdfunded by Pledge Music in 2012, it was available in a full ten-disc box exclusive through Amazon.com, and a four-disc "highlights" box available everywhere else. People who pledged money also got a digital copy of the out-of-print 1975 album Lucille Talks Back. Both versions of the box are physically out of print; the four disc edition is bundled along with Lucille Talks Back digitally, although this version removes King's first single.

== Track listing ==
=== Ten disc edition ===
Disc one – Three O'Clock Blues (1949-1956)

1. "Miss Martha King" (2:42)
2. "When Your Baby Packs Up and Goes" (2:29)
3. "Got the Blues" (2:47)
4. "Take a Swing with Me" (2:33)
5. "B.B. Boogie" (3:11)
6. Don’t You Want a Man Like Me" (2:21)
7. Fine Looking Woman" (2:23)
8. "She’s Dynamite" (2:30)
9. "Three O’Clock Blues" (3:02)
10. "That Ain’t the Way to Do It (2:17)
11. "You Know I Love You" (3:05)
12. "Woke Up This Morning" (2:57)
13. "Please Love Me" (2:51)
14. "Blind Love" (3:05)
15. "The Woman I Love" (2:41)
16. "Whole Lotta’ Love" (3:09)
17. "Everyday I Have the Blues" (2:49)
18. "Love You Baby" (AKA "Take a Swing with Me") (2:40)
19. "When My Heart Beats Like a Hammer" (2:54)
20. "You Upset Me Baby" (3:02)
21. "Sneakin’ Around" (3:02)
22. "Shut Your Mouth" (2:41)
23. "Boogie Rock" (3:05)
24. "Ten Long Years" (2:47)
25. "Crying Won’t Help You" (3:00)
26. "Bad Luck" (2.54)
27. "Troubles, Troubles, Troubles" (2:54)

Disc two – Rock Me Baby (1957-1962)

1. "Sweet Little Angel" (3:12)
2. "Early in the Morning" (2:34)
3. "(I’m Gonna) Quit My Baby" (2:32)
4. "On My Word of Honor" (2:54)
5. "Days of Old" (2:28)
6. "Recession Blues" (2:21)
7. "Please Accept My Love" (2:33)
8. "Everyday I Have the Blues" (5:05)
9. "Precious Lord" (3:22)
10. "Sweet Sixteen, Parts 1 & 2" (6:15)
11. "Don’t Get Around Much Anymore" (3:15)
12. "I’ll Survive" (2:40)
13. "(I’ve) Got a Right to Love My Baby" (3:14)
14. "It’s My Own Fault" (3:33)
15. "You Done Lost Your Good Thing Now" (5:09)
16. "Walking Dr. Bill" (3:40)
17. "Catfish Blues (Fishin’ After Me)" (2:31)
18. "Partin’ Time" (3:00)
19. "You’re Breaking My Heart" (4:13)
20. "Rock Me Baby" (3:00)
21. "Blue Shadows" (3:47)
22. "The Jungle" (3:14)
23. "That Evil Child" (3:51)

Disc three – How Blue Can You Get (1962-1966)

1. "You Ask Me" (2:10)
2. "I’m Gonna Sit In 'Til You Give In" (2:13)
3. "Blues at Midnight" (2:58)
4. "My Baby’s Coming Home" (2:08)
5. "Chains of Love" (2:35)
6. "Sneakin’ Around" (2:07)
7. "Slowly Losing My Mind" (2:32)
8. "How Blue Can You Get?" (2:42)
9. "Whole Lotta Lovin'" (2:26)
10. "I Wonder Why" (3:06)
11. "Please Accept My Love" (2:57)
12. "Help the Poor" (2:37)
13. "Never Trust a Woman" (2:36)
14. "Worryin’ Blues" (2:55)
15. "Stop Leadin’ Me On" (2:24)
16. "Everyday I Have the Blues" (3:08)
17. "Sweet Little Angel" (4:10)
18. "It’s My Own Fault" (3:06)
19. "How Blue Can You Get?" (3:35)
20. "Please Love Me" (3:00)
21. "Tired Of Your Jive" (2:10)
22. "All Over Again" (2:35)
23. "I’d Rather Drink Muddy Water" (2:21)
24. "Cherry Red" (2:26)
25. "You’re Still a Square" (2:23)
26. "Don’t Answer the Door, Parts 1 & 2" (5:10)
27. "Waitin’ On You" (2:26)
28. "Night Life" (2:34)

Disc four – Why I Sing The Blues (1964-1969)

1. "Gambler’s Blues" (5:12)
2. "Buzz Me" (4:16)
3. "Sweet Sixteen, Parts 1 & 2" (6:12)
4. "Think It Over" (2:50)
5. "I Done Got Wise" (2:20)
6. "Worried Dream" (2:54)
7. "Paying the Cost to Be the Boss" (2:34)
8. "I’m Gonna Do What They Do to Me" (2:47)
9. "Dance with Me" (3:21)
10. "Lucille" (10:14)
11. "Watch Yourself" (5:49)
12. "You Put It on Me" (2:46)
13. "Messy But Good" (2:35)
14. "Get Myself Somebody" (2:36)
15. "My Mood" (2:47)
16. "I Want You So Bad" (4:15)
17. "Get Off My Back Woman" (3:17)
18. "Why I Sing the Blues" (8:37)

Disc five – The Thrill Is Gone (1969-1971)

1. "The Thrill Is Gone" (5:25)
2. "Confessin’ the Blues" (4:55)
3. "So Excited" (5:37)
4. "No Good" (4:37)
5. "Go Underground"
6. "Nobody Loves Me But My Mother" (1:27)
7. "Chains and Things" (4:55)
8. "Ask Me No Questions" (3:09)
9. "Hummingbird" (4:38)
10. "Everyday I Have the Blues" (1:42)
11. "How Blue Can You Get?" (5:12)
12. "Worry, Worry" (9:55)
13. "Sweet Sixteen" (6:01)
14. "Eyesight to the Blind" (4:00)
15. "Niji Baby" (6:21)
16. "The Thrill Is Gone" (5:37)

Disc six – Lucille Talks Back (1971-1977)

1. "I Got Some Help I Don’t Need" (5:57)
2. "Blue Shadows" (5:09)
3. "Ghetto Woman" (5:15)
4. "Ain’t Nobody Home" (3:14)
5. "Guess Who" (4:09)
6. "Five Long Years" (5:14)
7. "I Like to Live the Love" (3:32)
8. "To Know You Is to Love You" (8:36)
9. "Philadelphia" (5:55)
10. "3 O’Clock Blues" (live) (3:17)
11. "Lucille Talks Back" (2:27)
12. "Reconsider Baby" (2:54)
13. "Don’t Make Me Pay for His Mistakes" (3:16)
14. "Let The Good Times Roll" (live) (5:38)
15. "Don’t You Lie to Me" (6:08)
16. "Mother Fuyer" (3:06)
17. "The Same Love That Made Me Laugh" (3:34)

Disc seven – When It All Comes Down (I'll Still Be Around) [1978-1983]

1. "When It All Comes Down (I’ll Still Be Around)" (4:12)
2. "Hold On (I Feel Our Love Is Changing)" (4:10)
3. "Never Make Your Move Too Soon" (5:32)
4. "Better Not Look Down" (3:21)
5. "Happy Birthday Blues" (3:16)
6. "I’ve Always Been Lonely" (5:27)
7. "Caldonia" (live) (2:49)
8. "I Got Some Help I Don’t Need" (live) (5:22)
9. "Life Ain’t Nothing But a Party" (6:15)
10. "The Victim" (6:17)
11. "There Must Be a Better World Somewhere" (5:38)
12. "Nightlife / Please Send Me Someone to Love" (4:35)
13. "Inflation Blues" (4:15)
14. "Sell My Monkey" (3:06)
15. "Darlin' You Know I Love You" (4:48)
16. "Make Love to Me" (4:19)

Disc eight – When Love Comes To Town (1985-1993)

1. "Into the Night" (4:12)
2. "Six Silver Strings" (4:21)
3. "When Love Comes to Town" (4:17)
4. "Standing on the Edge of Love" (5:21)
5. "Lay Another Log on the Fire" (4:03)
6. "Take Off Your Shoes" (5:34)
7. "Nobody Love Me But My Mother" (live) (8:08)
8. "Right Place, Wrong Time" (4:01)
9. "All Over Again" (live) (7:37)
10. "I’m Moving On" (4:16)
11. "Back In L.A." (5:02)
12. "Fool Me Once" (4:20)
13. "There Is Always One More Time" (8:26)
14. "Monday Morning Blues (Blues For Mr. G)" (4:17)
15. "Since I Met You Baby" (live) (4:40)

Disc nine – Blues Man (1993-1999)

1. "Playin’ With My Friends" (5:19)
2. "There’s Something on Your Mind" (6:00)
3. "I Gotta Move Out of This Neighborhood / Nobody Loves Me But My Mother" (8:58)
4. "You Don’t Know Me" (3:55)
5. "Stormy Monday Blues" (5:18)
6. "Rock Me Baby" (live) (6:21)
7. "Confessin’ the Blues" (4:31)
8. "Paying the Cost to Be the Boss" (3:34)
9. "Blues Man" (5:19)
10. "Bad Case of Love" (5:28)
11. "Blues Boys Tune" (3:28)
12. "I’ll Survive" (4:51)
13. "Ain’t Nobody Here But Us Chickens" (2:52)
14. "I'm Gonna Move to the Outskirts of Town" (4:51)
15. "Ain’t That Just Like a Woman" (3:32)
16. "Caldonia" (2:18)

Disc ten – Key to the Highway (2000-2008)

1. "Ten Long Years" (4:40)
2. "Key to the Highway" (3:40)
3. "I Got to Leave This Woman" (3:36)
4. "Monday Woman" (3:35)
5. "Don’t Go No Farther" (4:08)
6. "You’re on Top" (3:11)
7. "Back Door Santa" (3:26)
8. "Exactly Like You" (3:21)
9. "Sinner’s Prayer" (4:25)
10. "Early in the Morning" (4:49)
11. "Rock This House" (3:08)
12. "You Have a Way" (3:52)
13. "Everybody Loves You" (3:05)
14. "Key to the Highway" (live) (4:12)
15. "Midnight Blues" (3:44)
16. "Get These Blues off Me" (4:30)
17. "See That My Grave Is Kept Clean" (4:48)
18. "Waiting For Your Call" (5:57)
19. "Haunted House" (3:16)

=== Four-disc edition ===
Disc 1 (1949-1964)

1. Miss Martha King (1949 USA 78" on Bullet 309, A)
2. When Your Baby Packs Up And Goes (1949 USA 78" on Bullet 309, B-side to "Miss Martha King")
3. B.B. Boogie (1950 USA 78" on RPM 304, A)
4. She's Dynamite (1951 USA 78" on RPM 323, A)
5. Three O'Clock Blues (1951, USA 7" single on RPM 349, A)
6. Woke Up This Morning (1953, RPM 380, A)
7. Blind Love (1953, RPM 395, A)
8. When My Heart Beats Like A Hammer (1954, RPM 412, A)
9. You Upset Me Baby (1954, RPM 416, A)
10. Ten Long Years (1955, RPM 437, A)
11. Bad Luck (1956, RPM 468, A)
12. Troubles, Troubles, Troubles (1957, RPM 492, A)
13. Early in the Morning (1957, RPM 492, A)
14. Everyday I Have the Blues (1959, Kent 327, A)
15. (I've) Got a Right to Love My Baby (1960, Kent 333, A)
16. It's My Own Fault (1960, Kent 333, B-side to "(I've) Got A Right To Love My Baby")
17. Walking Dr. Bill (1960, Kent 350, A)
18. Rock Me Baby (1964, Kent 393, A)
19. You Ask Me (1962, ABC-Paramount 10316, A - and the US LP "Mr. Blues" on ABC-Paramount ABC-456)
20. Blues At Midnight (1962, ABC-Paramount 10334, A - and the US LP "Mr. Blues" on ABC-Paramount ABC-456)
21. Sneakin' Around (1963, ABC-Paramount 10361, A - and the US LP "Mr. Blues" on ABC-Paramount ABC-456)
22. How Blue Can You Get? (1964, ABC-Paramount 10527, A)
23. I Wonder Why - PREVIOUSLY UNRELEASED September 1963 Recording
24. Please Accept My Love (1964, ABC-Paramount 10527, B-side of "How Blue Can You Get?")
25. Help The Poor (1964, ABC-Paramount 10552, A)
26. Never Trust A Woman (1964, ABC-Paramount 10599, A)

Disc 2 (1964-1969)

1. Everyday I Have The Blues (Live)
2. Sweet Little Angel (Live)
3. Please Love Me (Live) - Tracks 1 to 3 from the 1965 USA LP "Live At The Regal" on ABC-Paramount ABC-509
4. All Over Again (1965, ABC-Paramount 10724, A - also on the 1968 US LP "His Best/The Electric B.B. King" on Bluesway BLS 6022)
5. Tired Of Your Jive (1965, ABC-Paramount 10675, A - also on the 1968 US LP "His Best/The Electric B.B. King" on Bluesway BLS 6022)
6. Cherry Red (from the 1966 US LP "Confessin' The Blues" on ABC-Paramount ABC-528)
7. Don't Answer The Door, Parts 1&2 (1966, ABC 10856, A - also on the 1968 US LP "His Best/The Electric B.B. King" on Bluesway BLS 6022)
8. Night Life (1966, ABC 10889, A)
9. Gambler's Blues (Live) (from the 1967 US LP "Blues Is King" on Bluesway BLS 6001)
10. Sweet Sixteen, Parts 1&2 (1967, Bluesway 61012, A&B-sides)
11. Worried Dream (1967, Bluesway 61007, A)
12. Paying The Cost To Be The Boss (1968, Bluesway 61015, A - also on the US LP "Blues On Top Of Blues" on Bluesway BLS 6011)
13. Watch Yourself
14. Lucille - tracks 13 and 14 are both from the 1968 US LP "Lucille" on Bluesway BLS 6016)
15. Why I Sing The Blues (1969, Bluesway 61024, A - also on the 1969 US LP "Live And Well" on Bluesway BLS 6031)
16. Confessin' The Blues (1969, Bluesway 61035, B-side of "So Excited" - also on the 1969 US LP "Completely Well" on Bluesway BLS 6037)
17. The Thrill Is Gone (1969, Bluesway 61032, A - also on the 1969 US LP "Completely Well" on Bluesway BLS 6037)

Disc 3 (1970-1983)

1. Nobody Loves Me But My Mother (1970, ABC 11290, A - also on the LP "Indianola Mississippi Seeds" on ABC Records ABC-713)
2. Chains And Things (1970, ABC 11280, A - also on the LP "Indianola Mississippi Seeds" on ABC Records ABC-713)
3. Hummingbird (1970, ABC 11268, A - also on the LP "Indianola Mississippi Seeds" on ABC Records ABC-713)
4. Worry, Worry (Live) (from the 1971 LP Live in Cook County Jail on ABC Records ABC 723)
5. Ghetto Woman (1971, ABC 11310, A - also on the 1971 LP "In London" on ABC Records ABC-730)
6. Ain't Nobody Home (1971, ABC 11316, A - also on the 1971 LP "In London" on ABC Records ABC-730)
7. Guess Who (1972, ABC 11330, A - also on the 1972 LP "Guess Who" on ABC Records ABC 759)
8. I Like To Live The Love (1973, ABC 11406, A - also on the 1973 LP "To Know You Is To Love You" on ABC Records ABCX-794)
9. Lucille Talks Back
10. Don't Make Me Pay For His Mistakes - tracks 9 and 10 from the 1975 LP "Lucille Talks Back" on ABC Records ABCD 898
11. Let The Good Times Roll (Live) (1976, ABC-Impulse 31006, A - also on the 1976 2LP Bobby Bland and B.B. King set "Together Again...Live" on ABC Records ASD 9317)
12. Mother Fuyer (from the 1977 LP "King Size" on ABC Records AB 977)
13. When It All Comes Down (I'll Still Be Around) (from the 1978 LP "Midnight Believer" on ABC Records AA 1061)
14. Better Not Look Down (1979, MCA 41062, A - also on the 1979 LP "Take It Home" on MCA Records MCA 3151)
15. There Must Be A Better World Somewhere (1981, MCA 51101, A - also on the 1981 LP "There Must Be A Better World Somewhere" on MCA Records MCA 5162)
16. Nightlife/Please Send Me Someone To Love (from the 1982 LP "Love Me Tender" on MCA Records MCA 5307)
17. Make Love To Me (from the 1983 LP "Blues `N' Jazz" on MCA Records MCA 27119)

Disc 4 (1984-2008)

1. Into The Night (1985, MCA 52530, A - also on the 1985 LP "Six Silver Strings" on MCA Records MCA 5616)
2. When Love Comes To Town [credited as U2 with B.B. KING] (1988, Island 7-99225, A - also on the U2 1988 double-album "Rattle And Hum" on Island 91003)
3. Take Off Your Shoes (from the 1989 LP "King Of The Blues: 1989" on MCA Records MCAD 42183)
4. I'm Moving On
5. There Is Always One More Time - tracks 4 and 5 from 1991 album "There Is Always One More Time" on MCA Records MCAD 10295)
6. Monday Morning Blues (Blues For Mr. G) (from the 1991 album "Garfield: Am I Cool Or What?" on GRP Records GRD 9641)
7. Playin' With My Friends [with ROBERT CRAY] (from the 1993 album "Blues Summit" on MCA Records MCA 10710)
8. Confessin' The Blues (from the 1997 album "Deuces Wild" on MCA Records MCA 11711)
9. Blues Man
10. I'll Survive - tracks 9 and 10 from the 1998 album "Blues On The Bayou" on MCA Records MCA 11879)
11. Caldonia
12. Ain't That Just Like A Woman - tracks 11 and 12 from the 1999 album "Let The Good Times Roll: The Music Of Louis Jordan" on MCA Records 088 112 042)
13. Monday Woman (from the 1999 album "Makin' Love Is Good For You" on MCA Records 088 112 241)
14. Ten Long Years [ERIC CLAPTON with B.B. KING] (from the 2000 album "Riding With The King" on Reprise 9 47612-2)
15. Early In The Morning [with VAN MORRISON] (from the 2005 album "80" on Geffen B0005263-02)
16. Key To The Highway (Live) (from the 2006 album "Live" on Geffen B0009770-02)
17. See That My Grave Is Kept Clean (from the 2008 album "One Kind Favor" on Geffen B0011791-02)

==== Note on iTunes edition ====
The digital version of the box set duplicates the four-disc version, but omits tracks 1 and 2 on disc one. Tracks 9 and 10 from disc three (taken from the 1975 album Lucille Talks Back) are removed from the set because the entire album is included as bonus tracks.
