= Mother Fuyer =

Single by Dirty Red
- B-side: "Home Last Night"
- Released: 1947
- Recorded: 1947
- Genre: Jump blues
- Label: Aladdin
- Songwriter: Dirty Red

"Mother Fuyer" is a jump blues song, written and recorded by Dirty Red in 1947. The single was released by Aladdin Records on a 78 rpm, 10" shellac single record.

== Background ==
The words "mother for you" or "mother fuyer", as minced oaths for "motherfucker", were used in blues and R&B records from the 1930s. Examples include Memphis Minnie's "Dirty Mother For You" (Decca Records, 1935) and Washboard Sam (1935), plus Roosevelt Sykes in 1936, with the slightly amended title of "Dirty Mother For You (Don't You Know)". The singer Stick McGhee, whose recording of "Drinking Wine Spo-Dee-O-Dee" was a hit in 1949, claimed that he had originally heard the song as "Drinking Wine, Motherfucker".

== Record ==
Red Nelson found no reason to be particularly oblique over the title of this jump blues track, which he recorded in 1947. It was released using the nom de disque, Dirty Red, by Aladdin Records (catalog reference 194A). The effective minced oath seemed to have confused the censors. The dirty blues lyrics included the lines "I got to put this mule to jumpin' in yo' stall, I'm a lovin' muther for ya". The track, which Nelson claimed to be his own on the record label, was clearly a variant of the earlier songs of a similar nature and song title.

Dirty Red's "Mother Fuyer" has been included on numerous compilation albums, including The Aladdin Records Story (1994). Dirty Red's recording was played on episode two of Bob Dylan's Theme Time Radio Hour, when the themed title was 'Mother'.

== Cover versions ==
The song was covered by Chick Willis on his 1972 album Stoop Down Baby... Let Your Daddy See, and released as a B-side on a single on La Val Records. Willis claimed songwriting credits.

The song was also covered by B.B. King in 1977 and appeared on his album, King Size, with King this time claiming ownership of the songwriting. It was also on his subsequent compilation albums, King of the Blues (1992) and Ladies and Gentlemen... Mr. B.B. King (2012).

Magic Slim recorded a live cover version of "Mother Fuyer" for his 1987 album, Live At B.L.U.E.S.

Mama's Pride recorded the song for their 2006 live album, A "Live" and Well.

== Other variants ==
Johnny "Guitar" Watson had a hit in 1977 with "A Real Mother For Ya".

Billy Boy Arnold included a song with the title "Dirty Mother Fuyer", as the opening track on his 1979 album, Checkin' It Out.
