= Kay Martin & Her Body Guards =

Kay Martin and Her Body Guards was a nightclub act consisting of Kay Martin together with Jess Hotchkiss and Bill Elliot. From 1953 to 1963 their popular, often risqué material received top billing in Las Vegas and Reno casinos and was in demand across the southern United States.

Their six live recordings became popular adult party albums, often sold at the door after the live show. Their best known recording was the 1962 Christmas album "I Know What He Wants For Christmas… but I don't know how to wrap it!". Sometimes the record sleeve graphic would feature ex-model Martin but more often an anonymous model. Sometimes there was an alternative "party" version featuring a nude model on the cover.

== Selected discography ==
=== Albums ===
- "Kay Martin and Her Body Guards" (Roulette Records) 1958
- "Kay Martin At The Lorelei" (Dyna Records) 1960
- "I Know What He Wants For Christmas…But I Don't Know How to Wrap It!" (Fax Records) 1960
- "Kay Martin At Las Vegas" (Record Productions Inc.) 1962, reissued on (Laff Records) circa 1970
- "Kay Martin Sings Naughty And Nice Songs" (Record Productions Inc.) 1965 compilation

Note: "Kay Martin At Las Vegas" is a reissue of the album "Kay Martin At The Lorelei" and over the years has been re-released several times on various labels and with different covers.

=== Singles ===
- "Fever" / "The Heel" / "Summertime" / "Johnny Guitar" (Electrola Records) Germany 1958 extended play
- "Take My Love" / "Ooh La-La" (Modern Sounds Records) 1958
- "I'm Gonna Set Fire To My House" / "I've Found Peace Of Mind" (Decca Records) 1959
- "Come By Sunday" / "No More Tears To Cry" (Unart Records) 1959
- "Fever" / "The Heel" / "Summertime" / "Johnny Guitar" (Roulette Records) Netherlands 1962 extended play
