= Dinah, Dinah Show us your Leg =

Song
- Songwriter(s): Unknown

"Dinah, Dinah Show us your Leg" is an American bawdy song.

The formula is a descending scale: "Rich girl [does something,] Poor girl [does something else], my girl don't [do whatever the other two do, usually with comic effect.]. The twentieth century versions are possibly the result of merging a minstrel song with "Coming Round the Mountain".

In "Negro Singers' Own Book" (c 1846) there is a song about animals:

Mr. Coon he is a mighty man,
He carries a bushy tail,
He steals old massa's corn at night,
And husks it on a rail.

De mink he is a mighty thing,
He rambles in de dark;
The only ting disturbs his peace
Is my old bull dog's bark.

By 1915 this had become a comment on the fashion tastes of white women:

Well a white lady wears a hobble skirt,
A yaller gal tries to do the same,
But a poor black gal wears a Mary Jane,
But she's hobbling just the same.

Well a white lady sleeps in a feather bed,
A yaller gal tries to do the same,
But a poor black gal makes a pallet on de floor,
But she's sleeping just the same.

Notably lacking in those songs, is a chorus. Another song, "Charmin' Betsy", noted in 1908, is clearly related to "Coming Round The Mountain":

I'm comin' round the mountain, Charmin' Betsy,
I'm comin' round the mountain, 'fore I leave,
An' if I never more see you,
Take this ring, an' think of me.

An' wear this ring I give you,
An' wear it on your right han',
An' when I'm dead an' forgotten,
Don't give it to no other man.

By 1914, these two songs had become merged into a new song, sometimes called "Charmin' Betsy". A version collected in 1914, called 'White Gal, Yaller Girl, Black Gal' goes as follows:

Oh, a yaller gal, she wears a hobble skirt
Brown gal, she does the same
Black gal wears an old Mary Jane
But it's a hobble just the same

Oh, coming round the mountain, charming Betsy
Coming round the mountain, Cora Lee
If I die before I wake
Do, gals, remember me

Louise Rand Bascom, in an essay in the Journal of American Folklore Apr–June 1909, dated the song back into the 19th century. It appears to cross over between the black and white communities, united in saucy humour. Other version have "City girls, country girls, mountain girls", "White girl, yellow girl, black girl" (or the other way around).

== Recorded versions ==
- Fiddlin' John Carson "Charming Betsy" (1925)
- Dora Carr as "Black Girl Gets There Just The Same" (1925) (on "Cow Cow Davenport" 1924–29)
- Land Norris "Charming Betsy" (c 1926)
- Jim Jackson on "Jim Jackson Vol 2" (1928–30) (as "Goin' Round The Mountain")
- Cleve Chaffin & The MCClung Brothers "Rock House Gamblers" (c 1930)
- Georgia Organ Grinders "Charming Betsy" (1929)
- Davis and Nelson "Charming Betsy" (c 1929)
- Henry Thomas "Charming Betsy" (on "Texas Worried Blues 1927–29")
- Roy Acuff and His Crazy Tennesseans on "Steamboat Whistle Blues" (1936–39)
- The Farmers Boys on "Flash Crash and Thunder" (1955–57)
- The Limelighters on "The Slightly Fabulous Limelighters" (1961)
- Snuffy Jenkins on "Pioneer of the Bluegrass Banjo" (1962)
- Jim Kweskin and The Jug Band on "Unblushing Brassiness" (1963) (as "My Gal")
- Putnam String County Band on "Home Grown" (1973)
- New Sand Mountain Wildcats on "Gather 'Round" (1984)
- Ted Mulry Gang on "TMG Live" (1979)
- The Tennessee Mafia Jug Band on "Barnyard Frolic"
- Bruce Molsky on "Contented Must Be" (2004)
- The Virginia Mountain Boys on "Old Time Bluegrass from Grayson and Carroll Virginia: Vol 3"
- Hodges Brothers on "Bogue Chitto Flingding"
- Coal Creek Bluegrass Band on "Love of the Mountains" (2003)

Fiddlin' John Carson's version of "Charming Betsy" (1925) is like this:

The first time I saw Charming Betsy
She's a-running on that eastbound train
And the next time I seen Charming Betsy
She's a-wearing the ball and chain

Jim Jackson's "Going Round the Mountain" (1928) has these lines:

Well a white man gives his wife a ten dollar bill
He thinks that's nothing strange
But a coloured man give his wife a one dollar bill
And beat her to death 'bout the 90 cents change

Chorus:

I'm goin' round the mountain, Charmin' Betsy
Going round the mountain, Cora Lee
Now if I never see you again
Do Lord, remember me

Well a white man lives in a fine brick house
He thinks that's nothing strange
But we poor coloured men lives in the county jail
But it's a brick house just the same

The Limelighters's version has:

Rich gal she drives a fancy Rolls
Poor gal she drives a Model A
Well my gal she only has to use her thumb
She gets there just the same

Rich gal she wears the finest clothes
Poor gal she'd like to do the same
My gal she doesn't wear a dogonne thing
But I love her, yeah, just the same

The satire on women's fashion lives on in a polite versions of this song, "How I Love You Darling" and "She's My Baby Doll". To prove that women have a sense of humour as well, the "Girl Scouts of the USA" have a version of "Charmin' Betsy" (https://web.archive.org/web/20110710184244/http://www.elowin.com/songs/charmin_betsy.html)

By the 1960s, even sexier verses were known:

Dinah, Dinah show us your leg,
show us your leg, show us your leg
Dinah, Dinah show us your leg,
A yard above the knee

A rich girl rides in a limousine
A poor girl rides a truck
But the only ride that Dinah takes
is when she has a..

A rich girl uses a brassiere
A poor girl uses string
But Dinah uses nothing at all
she just lets the buggers swing
