= Vulgarism =

Expression considered non-standard, characteristic of uneducated speech or writing

In the study of language and literary style, a vulgarism is an expression or usage considered non-standard or characteristic of uneducated speech or writing. In colloquial or lexical English, "vulgarism" or "vulgarity" may be synonymous with profanity or obscenity, but a linguistic or literary vulgarism encompasses a broader category of perceived fault not confined to scatological or sexual offensiveness. These faults may include errors of pronunciation, misspellings, word malformations, and malapropisms. "Vulgarity" is generally used in the more restricted sense. In regular and mostly informal conversations, the presence of vulgarity, if any, are mostly for intensifying, exclaiming or scolding. In modern times, vulgarism continues to be frequently used by people. A research paper produced by Oxford University in 2005 shows that the age group of 10–20 years old speak more vulgarity than the rest of the world's population combined. The frequent and prevalent usage of vulgarity as a whole has led to a paradox, in which people use vulgarity so often that it becomes less and less offensive to people, according to The New York Times.

In the realm of ideas, vulgarisation (also vulgarization) is the process of adapting a complex or specialist theory for a popular, non-specialist audience. While this can broaden an idea's impact, the term often carries a pejorative sense, implying that the original work's nuances and subtleties have been lost or distorted in the simplification. A prominent example of vulgarisation is how Charles Darwin's complex theory of natural selection was popularly reduced to the slogan "survival of the fittest". The phrase was coined by the philosopher Herbert Spencer, not Darwin, and was central to the ideology of Social Darwinism, which applied the simplified biological concept to justify social inequality, imperialism, and laissez-faire capitalism.

== Classicism ==
The English word "vulgarism" derives ultimately from Latin vulgus, "the common people", often as a pejorative meaning "the [unwashed] masses, undifferentiated herd, a mob". In classical studies, Vulgar Latin as the Latin of everyday life is conventionally contrasted to Classical Latin, the literary language exemplified by the "Golden Age" canon (Cicero, Caesar, Vergil, Ovid, among others). This distinction was always an untenable mode of literary criticism, unduly problematizing, for instance, the so-called "Silver Age" novelist Petronius, whose complex and sophisticated prose style in the Satyricon is full of conversational vulgarisms.

== Social class ==
Vulgarism has been a particular concern of British English traditionalists. In the 1920s, the English lexicographer Henry Wyld defined "vulgarism" as:

a peculiarity which intrudes itself into Standard English, and is of such a nature as to be associated with the speech of vulgar or uneducated speakers. The origin of pure vulgarisms is usually that they are importations, not from a regional but from a class dialect—in this case from a dialect which is not that of a province, but of a low or uneducated social class. ... [A vulgarism] is usually a variety of Standard English, but a bad variety.

The moral and aesthetic values explicit in such a definition depends on class hierarchy viewed as authoritative. For instance, the "misuse" of aspiration (H-dropping, such as pronouncing "have" as "'ave") has been considered a mark of the lower classes in England at least since the late 18th century, as dramatized in My Fair Lady. Because linguistic vulgarism betrayed social class, its avoidance became an aspect of etiquette. In 19th-century England, books such as The Vulgarisms and Improprieties of the English Language (1833) by W. H. Savage, reflected upper-middle-class anxieties about "correctness and good breeding".

Vulgarisms in a literary work may be used deliberately to further characterization, by use of "eye dialect" or simply by vocabulary choice.

== See also ==
- Barbarism (linguistics)
- Disputes in English grammar
- Euphemism
- Grotesque body
- Heteroglossia
- Linguistic purism
- Solecism
- Vernacular
