= Red Nelson (musician) =

American songwriter

- Also known as: Dirty Red
- Born: Nelson Wilborn; August 31, 1907; Sumner, Tallahatchie County, Mississippi, United States
- Died: March 1970 (aged 62) Chicago, Illinois, United States
- Genres: Blues
- Occupations: Singer, guitarist
- Instruments: Vocals, guitar
- Years active: 1935–1960s
- Labels: Decca, Aladdin

Nelson Wilborn (August 31, 1907 – March 1970), better known as Red Nelson or Dirty Red, was an American blues singer and occasional guitarist. His recording career lasted well over a decade. Two of his standout songs are "Crying Mother Blues" and "Streamline Train" (both 1936). His accompanists on record variously included Cripple Clarence Lofton, Blind John Davis, Black Bob, Kansas Joe McCoy, Papa Charlie McCoy, Big Bill Broonzy and Lonnie Johnson.

His 1947 release "Mother Fuyer" managed to escaped censorship.

== Life and career ==
Nelson Wilborn was born in Sumner, Tallahatchie County, Mississippi. He relocated to Chicago, Illinois, in the early 1930s, where he regularly performed in their nightclubs. Nelson's recording career began in 1935 and lasted until 1947. He was noted as "a fine vocalist with a telling falsetto", and was fortunate to be accompanied in his recordings with some of the best musicians available at that time. These included the pianist Cripple Clarence Lofton, with whom Nelson recorded several sides for Decca Records during 1935 and 1936. "Crying Mother Blues" and "Streamline Train" (both 1936) are two of the tracks from the period that music journalists have described as the best of his career. The two tracks were also issued on the same shellac disc by Brunswick Records in its Sepia Series. Others who accompanied Nelson on record were the pianists Charles Avery, Blind John Davis and Black Bob and the guitarists Kansas Joe McCoy, Papa Charlie McCoy and Big Bill Broonzy. His vocals were often held back from emotional extremes, to serve the fashion of the time.

Nelson later recorded with James Clark playing piano, particularly on his recordings in 1947, issued by Aladdin Records. His guitar accompaniment at that time was provided by Lonnie Johnson.

"Mother Fuyer", a jump blues song in the dirty blues tradition (including the lyric "I got to put this mule to jumpin' in yo' stall, I'm a lovin' muther for ya") written and recorded by Nelson in 1947 under the nom de disque Dirty Red, was released by Aladdin Records as a 78-rpm 10" shellac disc. The sly title seems to have evaded the censors.

Nelson was described by more than one source as "an amiable alcoholic", although he maintained a working schedule in which he worked briefly with the Muddy Waters band in the 1960s. Sheldon Harris's 1979 edition of Blues Who's Who stated that he "frequently worked outside of music (as a waiter), Trocadero Lounge Club, Chicago into the 60s". His whereabouts thereafter are shrouded in mystery, and, rather oddly, there appears to be no surviving photograph of him. He was known to like double entendres, which may have explained his brief excursion from normality.

Nelson died in March 1970, aged 62, in Chicago.

In 1998, Old Tramp Records issued an album of all of Nelson's known recordings, Red Nelson: In Chronological Order (1935–1947).
