= Jack O'Brien =

Jack O'Brien may refer to:

== Sports ==
- Jack O'Brien (American football) (born 1932), American football player
- Jack O'Brien (catcher) (1860–1910), Major League Baseball player
- Jack O'Brien (cricketer) (1886–1939), New Zealand cricketer
- Jack O'Brien (footballer, born 1887) (1887–1959), Australian rules footballer for Essendon and Fitzroy
- Jack O'Brien (footballer, born 1893) (1893–1934), Australian rules footballer for South Melbourne
- Jack O'Brien (footballer, born 1898) (1898–1966), Australian rules footballer for Essendon and Footscray
- Jack O'Brien (footballer, born 1906) (1906–1970), Australian rules footballer for South Melbourne and Hawthorn
- Jack O'Brien (outfielder) (1873–1933), American baseball player
- Jack O'Brien (wrestler) (1910–1982), American-born Mexican professional wrestler
- Jack O'Brien (rugby union), New Zealand international rugby union player
- Philadelphia Jack O'Brien (1878–1942), American boxer, former light heavyweight boxing champion of the world
- Young Jack O'Brien (1894–?), lightweight boxer from Pennsylvania

== Others ==
- Jack O'Brien (director) (born 1939), American theatre director and producer
- Jack O'Brien (jazz pianist) (1903–1982), big band pianist and songwriter
- John B. O'Brien (known as Jack, 1884-1936), American actor and film director
- Jack O'Brien, founder of American website of Cracked.com

== See also ==
- John O'Brien (disambiguation)
- Jack O'Brian (1914–2000), journalist
