= Bert Lown =

American musician (1903–1962)

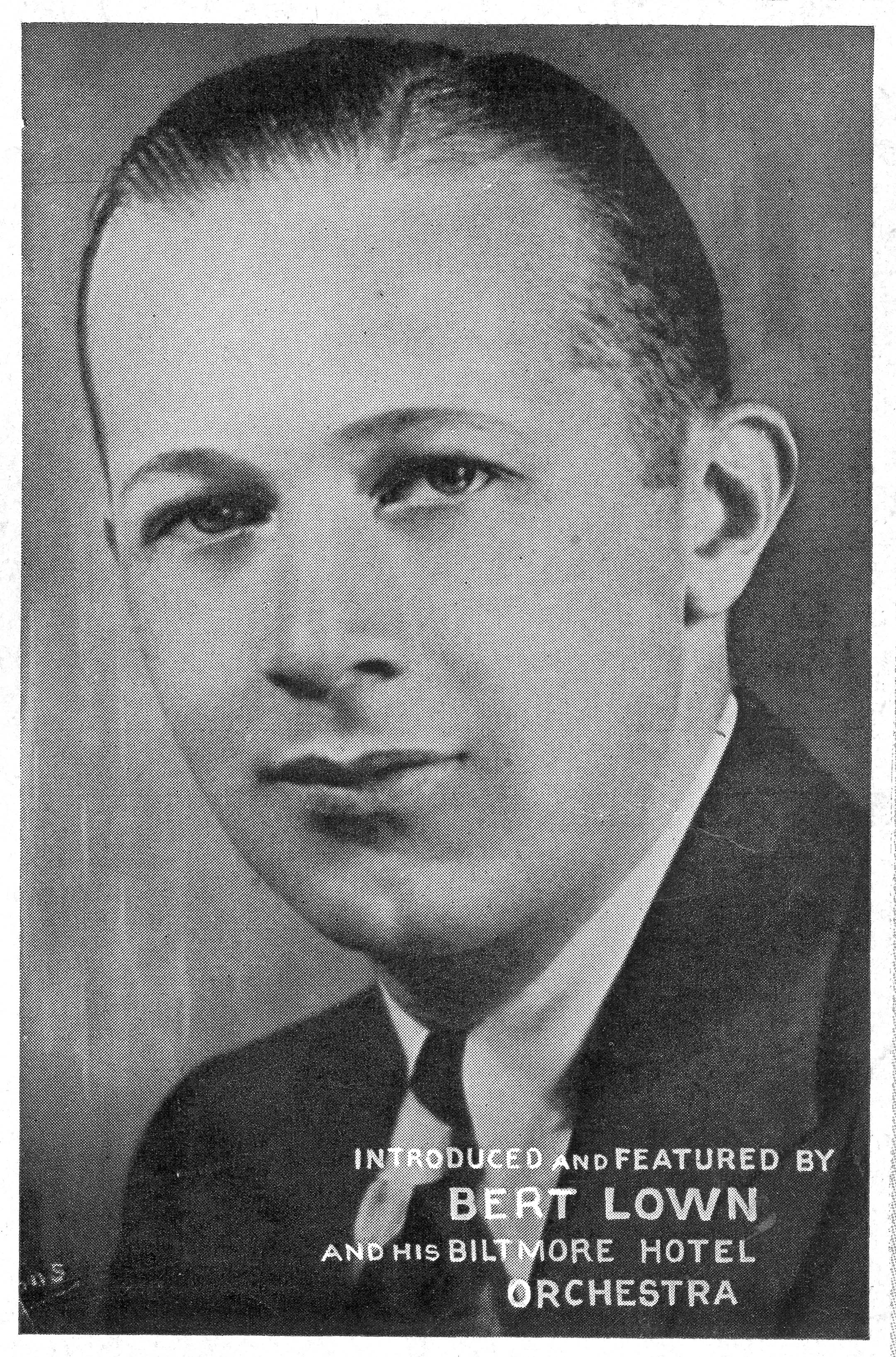
- (photo from the cover of the sheet music issue of "By My Side")

Background information
- Also known as: Bert Lee
- Born: Albert Charles Lown; June 6, 1903; White Plains, New York, United States
- Died: November 20, 1962 (aged 59) Portland, Oregon, United States
- Genres: Swing; jazz
- Occupation: Bandleader
- Instrument: Violin
- Years active: 1920s–1930s
- Labels: Diva, Harmony, Velvet Tone, Columbia, Victor, Bluebird

Bert Lown (born Albert Charles Lown; June 6, 1903 – November 20, 1962) was an American violinist, orchestra leader, and songwriter.

== Career ==
Lown was born in White Plains, New York. He began as a sideman playing the violin in Fred Hamm's band, and in the 1920s and 1930s he led a series of jazz-oriented dance bands (the most famous being the Biltmore Hotel Orchestra), making a large number of recordings in that period for Victor Records. In 1925 (or 1930), (with Hamm, Dave Bennett, and Chauncey Gray) he composed the well-known standard "Bye Bye Blues." He also wrote some other songs, including "You're The One I Care For" and "Tired." By the mid-1930s he quit leading the orchestras, becoming a booking agent and manager; eventually he left the music industry and moved on to executive positions in the television industry. He died of a heart attack in 1962 in Portland, Oregon.

== Collaborators ==
The song writing, Lown's collaborators included Moe Jaffe, Jack O'Brien (pianist with Ted Weems in the 1930s), and Fred Hamm.

== Recording history ==
- 1929 he recorded for Columbia's dime store labels (Diva, Harmony, and Velvet Tone)
- 1930 he recorded for the Plaza/ARC dime store labels (including Banner, Cameo, Pathe, Perfect, Jewel, Regal Records, Conqueror)
- 1930 he also recorded two sessions for Hit of the Week
- 1930 he also recorded two sessions for Columbia
- 1930-1932 he recorded prolifically for Victor
- 1933 while still signed to Victor, his records were assigned to the new Bluebird dime store label (these sides were also released on Electradisk, the super rare Sunrise label, as well as the special Fox Movietone label).

== Selected compositions ==
- "Bye Bye Blues"
- "You're the One I Care For"
- "By My Side"
- "Tired"
- "I'm Disappointed in You"
- "My Heart and I"
- "Today and Tomorrow"
- "Let Me Fill Your Day With Music"
- "Thumbs Up," theme song in 1941 of the British War Relief Society
- "I Wish I Had Wings"

== Pseudonym ==
Bert Lown sometimes used the pseudonym "Bert Lee."
