= Jack Rowan =

Jack Rowan may refer to:

- Jack Rowan (baseball) (1886–1966), Major League Baseball pitcher
- Jack Rowan (boxer) (1887–1959), American middleweight boxer
- Jack C. Rowan (1911–1990), head football coach for Northeast Louisiana State
- Jack Rowan (actor) (born 1997), actor
- Jack Rowan (pole vaulter) (born 1930), American pole vaulter, 1951 NCAA runner-up for the USC Trojans track and field team
