= Jock O'Brien =

Jock O'Brien may refer to:

- Jock O'Brien (footballer, born 1909) (1909–1985), Australian rules footballer for Essendon
- Jock O'Brien (footballer, born 1937), Australian rules footballer for North Melbourne

== See also ==
- John O'Brien (disambiguation)
