= John O'Brien =

John O'Brien may refer to:

== Public officials ==
=== American ===
- John O'Brien (Ohio politician) (1932–1985), member of the Ohio House of Representatives
- John D. O'Brien, state senator in the 1997–1998 Massachusetts legislature
- John F. O'Brien (secretary of state) (c. 1850–1927), Secretary of State of New York, 1903–1906
- John F. O'Brien (judge) (1874–1939), New York Court of Appeals judge
- John H. O'Brien, 4th Fire Commissioner of the City of New York
- John J. O'Brien (civil servant) (1919–2001), investigated the assassination of President John F. Kennedy
- John J. O'Brien (commissioner), former commissioner of the Massachusetts Probation Service
- John P. O'Brien (1873–1951), 98th mayor of New York City
- John L. O'Brien (1911–2007), American politician in the Washington State House of Representatives

=== Irish ===
- John O'Brien (bishop) (died 1767), Irish Bishop of Cork and Cloyne
- John O'Brien (Irish politician) (1794–1855), MP for Limerick City in the UK Parliament 1841–1852
- John O'Brien (priest) (1931–2008), Irish Roman Catholic priest and musician
- John Thomond O'Brien (1786–1861), Irish soldier in the Argentine War of Independence
- Joseph O'Sullivan, who assumed the name "John O'Brien" while under arrest for the 1922 assassination of Sir Henry Wilson

=== British ===
- John O'Brien (British politician) (died 1982), far right figure, onetime leader of the British National Front
- Sir Terence O'Brien (colonial administrator) (John Terence Nicholls O'Brien, 1830–1904), British surveyor, engineer and colonial governor

=== Canadian ===
- John O'Brien (admiral) (1918–1996), commander of the Royal Canadian Navy
- John O'Brien (Canadian politician) (1847–1917), merchant and member of the Legislative Assembly of New Brunswick

=== New Zealand ===
- John O'Brien (New Zealand politician) (1925–1990), New Zealand political candidate and party leader

=== Australian ===
- John O'Brien (Australian politician) (1866–1932), Member of the Queensland Legislative Assembly
- John O'Brien (Australian Army officer) (1908–1980), Australian major general and Mayor of Woollahra

== Sportspeople ==
=== Baseball ===
- John O'Brien (outfielder) (1851–1914), baseball outfielder
- John O'Brien (second baseman) (1866–1913), baseball infielder
- Johnny O'Brien (1930–2025), 1950s baseball second baseman
- Cinders O'Brien (John F. O'Brien, 1867–1892), baseball pitcher

=== Footballers ===
- John O'Brien (Dublin footballer), senior inter-county Gaelic footballer for Dublin and Round Towers, Clondalkin
- John O'Brien (Louth footballer) (born 1985), Gaelic footballer for Louth
- John O'Brien (soccer) (born 1977), American soccer player
- Jon O'Brien (born 1961), English footballer

=== Other sports ===
- John O'Brien (basketball, born 1888) (1888–1967), American basketball referee and executive
- John O'Brien (basketball, born 1916) (1916–1994), American professional basketball player in the 1940s
- John O'Brien (boxer) (1937–1979), Scottish boxer of the 1960s and '70s
- John O'Brien (cricketer, born 1961), English cricketer
- John O'Brien (Irish cricketer) (1866–1920), Irish cricketer
- John O'Brien (hurler) (born 1982), Irish hurler
- John O'Brien (rower) (1927–1995), New Zealand representative rower
- John O'Brien (tennis) (born 1932), Australian tennis player and hostage in the 2014 Sydney hostage crisis
- John O'Brien (water polo) (1931–2020), Australian Olympic water polo player
- John Ambrose O'Brien (1885–1968), founding owner of the Montreal Canadiens ice hockey team
- John O'Brien (businessman), British businessman
- John O'Brien (rugby union), New Zealand international rugby union player

== Other people ==
- John O'Brien (marine artist) (1831–1891), Canadian marine artist
- John O'Brien, the original name of stage actor John T. Raymond (1836–1887)
- John O'Brien (poet) (1878–1952), Australian priest, poet and author
- John B. O'Brien (1884–1936), American actor and director
- John O'Brien (publisher), Irish American publisher and academic
- John O'Brien (novelist) (1960–1994), American author
- John O'Brien (filmmaker) (born 1962), Vermont film director
- John O'Brien (advocate), disability inclusion advocate and writer
- John O'Brien (screenwriter), screenwriter of Fireflies and K-9
- John Roger O'Brien (1903–1982), birth name of Jack O'Brien (jazz pianist)
- Johnny B. O'Brien, one of The 2 Johnnies, Ireland

== See also ==
- Jack O'Brien (disambiguation)
- Sean O'Brien (disambiguation)
