= Shaun O'Brien =

Shaun O'Brien may refer to:

- Shaun O'Brien (cyclist)
- Shaun O'Brien (hurler)

== See also ==
- Sean O'Brien (disambiguation)
