= Bye Bye Blues (song) =

Single by Les Paul and Mary Ford
- B-side: "Mammy's Boogie"
- Released: November 1952
- Genre: Vocal
- Length: 2:05
- Label: Capitol
- Songwriters: Fred Hamm, Dave Bennett, Bert Lown, Chauncey Gray

Les Paul and Mary Ford singles chronology
"My Baby's Coming Home" (1952)	"Bye Bye Blues" (1952)	"I'm Sitting on Top of the World" (1953)

"Bye Bye Blues" is an American popular and jazz standard written by Fred Hamm, Dave Bennett, Bert Lown, and Chauncey Gray and published in 1925.

== Background ==
The song was first published by Irving Berlin Inc. in 1925 in a version credited only to bandleader Fred Hamm and pianist and arranger Dave Bennett. This version of the song was recorded by Fred Hamm and His Orchestra in 1925 on Victor 19662, but the song did not become widely popular.

1930, a new version of the song was published by Irving Berlin Inc. that included an entirely new verse section, and a new lyric for the chorus. For this version of the song, bandleader Bert Lown and composer and pianist Chauncey Gray were added to the composer credits, alongside Hamm and Bennett. Bert Lown And His Hotel Biltmore Orchestra recorded the song in 1930 on Columbia 2258-D, and the song caught on quickly, with at least six additional commercial recordings over the next 12 months, including those by Louis Armstrong (Parlophone R 796) and Frankie Trumbauer (Okeh 41450). In 1930 it was sung by The Vikings on the NBC radio series, The Vikings as well. Several more commercial recordings appeared over the 1930s and 1940s.

In 1952, Les Paul and Mary Ford released a recording on their Capitol Records album "Bye Bye Blues". The single release of their version (Capitol 2316) reached the Billboard Best Seller chart on December 27, 1952, and lasted 5 weeks on the chart, peaking at No. 5.

== Movie appearances ==
The song appeared as the title track of the 1989 film Bye Bye Blues. The song also appeared in the 1957 film The Joker is Wild and the 2005 film The Prize Winner of Defiance, Ohio.

== Recorded versions ==
- Ambrose (bandleader) and his orchestra (1930)
- Bert Lown (1930)
- Nat Gonella and His Georgians (1936)
- Cab Calloway and his orchestra (1941)
- Oscar Alemán (1942)
- Arnold Ross Quintet featuring Benny Carter (1946)
- Peggy Lee (recorded December 26, 1947)
- Benny Goodman and his orchestra (1948)
- Mary Lou Williams (1949)
- Dinah Washington (1953)
- Cal Tjader on his album 'Latin Kick' (1956)
- Mose Allison (1958)
- Ferrante and Teicher (1958)
- Jill Corey (1957)
- Freddy Cannon (1960)
- Ann-Margret (1961)
- Duane Eddy (1967)
- Rob McConnell and the Boss Brass on Atras Da Porta (1983)
- The Chenille Sisters (1992)
- Doc Watson for his 1996 album Doc Watson in Nashville: Good Deal!
- Count Basie and his orchestra
- Tex Beneke and his orchestra
- Chas and Dave
- Mark Cosgrove
- Bing Crosby and Louis Armstrong for their 1960 album Bing & Satchmo.
- Fred Hamm and His Orchestra (May 1, 1925, Victor 19662-B <Discography of American Historical Recordings (DAHR)>
- Al Hirt
- Harry James and his orchestra
- Rebecca Jenkins in the movie of the same name (1989)
- Bert Kaempfert (1966 Top 100 single, peaking at No. 54, and No. 5 Easy Listening)
- The Spotnicks (1964)
- Kay Kyser and his orchestra
- Brenda Lee (1966)
- Liberace
- Julie London (1957)
- Bert Lown and his orchestra (1930)
- Helen O'Connell
- Oscar Peterson
- Leo Reisman and his orchestra (vocal: Don Howard) (1930)
- Jimmy Roselli (1981)
- Dinah Shore (1949) (1960)
- Hank Snow
- Nino Tempo and April Stevens (1968)
- Merle Travis
- Frankie Trumbauer and his orchestra (vocal: Scrappy Lambert) (1930)
- Andy Williams in (1966) as the B-side to the single, "May Each Day"
- Teddy Wilson
- Doyle Dykes on "Chameleon"
- Henri Salvador in "avec la bouche"
- Juan García Esquivel on "Infinity In Sound Vol. 2" (1961)
- James Last (1966)
- Julie Andrews on her live album "An Evening with Julie Andrews" (1977)
