= Terry Allen (big band singer) =

American singer

- Born: September 12, 1916; Tecumseh, Oklahoma, U.S.
- Died: October 1981 (aged 65)
- Genres: Big band, jazz
- Instrument: Vocals

Terry Allen (September 12, 1916 – October 1981) was an American baritone vocalist active during the Big Band era.

== Career ==
In 1938, Allen joined Red Norvo's band, performing the vocals on a number of Norvo's recordings, especially "I Get Along Without You Very Well," a big Norvo hit in 1939. In 1939, he joined Larry Clinton's band and recorded a hit in 1940, "My Greatest Mistake." Allen moved to Claude Thornhill's band in 1941 and Will Bradley's in 1942. Allen also, in 1942, sang with Hal McIntyre.

In August 1944, after being honorably discharged from the United States Navy, Allen began performing with Johnny Long and His Orchestra at the New Yorker hotel. In 1947, he recorded "Jade Green" (Edmund Anderson, words; David Broekman, music) and "Another Memory" (Atlantic 683) with the David Broekman (fr) Orchestra.
