= Young Jack O'Brien =

American boxer

Personal information
- Nickname: Young Philadelphia Jack O'Brien
- Nationality: (United States) American
- Born: John Thomas Augustine Hagan; October 11, 1894 Philadelphia, Pennsylvania
- Height: 5 ft 9 in (1.75 m)
- Weight: Welterweight

Boxing career
- Stance: Orthodox

Boxing record
- Total fights: 101
- Wins: 60
- Win by KO: 6
- Losses: 22
- Draws: 18
- No contests: 1

Young Jack O'Brien, born John Thomas Augustine Hagan was a lightweight and welterweight boxer from Pennsylvania.

== Biography ==
Young Jack O'Brien was the brother of Philadelphia Jack O'Brien and the cousin of heavyweight boxer Jack Rowan. On September 18, 1912 he beat Young Brown at the St. Nicholas Arena in New York City.
