= I Wish I Had Wings =

1932 film by Rudolf Ising

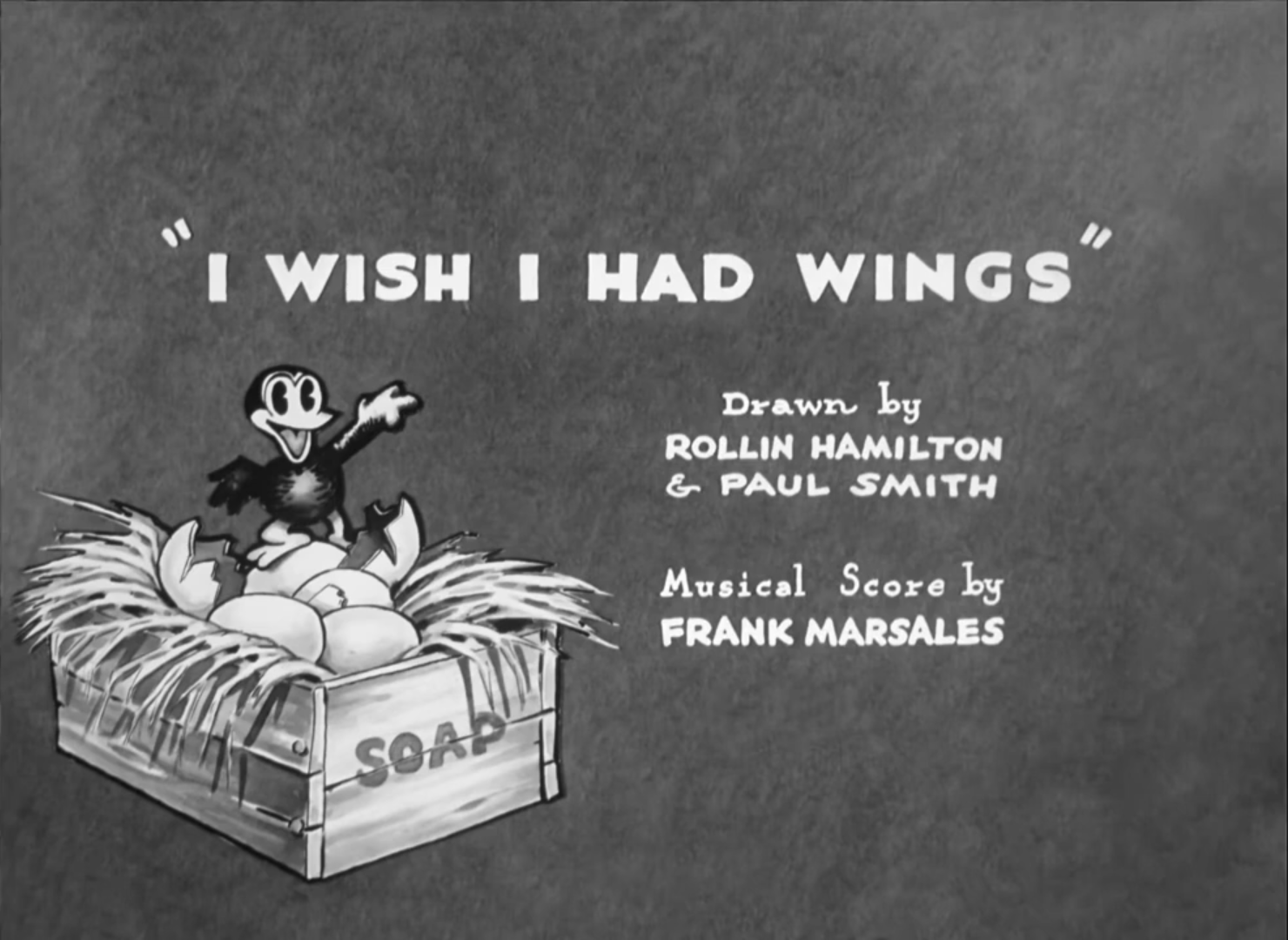
- Title card
- Directed by: Rudolf Ising
- Produced by: Hugh Harman; Rudolf Ising; Leon Schlesinger
- Music by: Frank Marsales
- Animation by: Rollin Hamilton; Paul Smith
- Color process: Black and white
- Production companies: Harman-Ising Productions; Leon Schlesinger Productions
- Distributed by: Warner Bros. Pictures; The Vitaphone Corporation
- Release date: September 22, 1932
- Running time: 7 min
- Country: United States
- Language: English

I Wish I Had Wings is a 1932 American animated comedy short film directed by Rudolf Ising. It is the sixteenth film in the Merrie Melodies series, featuring the titular song by Bert Lown. It was released on September 22, 1932.

== Plot ==
The film (some voices are muted)

One morning, a rooster wakes up the other animals at a barn. He commands the ducks to march, chickens leave from under a sleeping hen. The hen uses a stethoscope to search for earthworms, finding a large one that she grinds into multiple smaller worms for the chicks to chase. One chick chases after one of the small worms, which outwits it by using an underground passage to navigate behind the chick and hit him from behind with a plank.

An old hen knits while using a heating pad to warm her eggs. The rooster enters, believing her to hiding something from him, only to reveal her knitted goods. Realizing that her eggs will soon hatch, the rooster dispatches a medic rooster, which helps hatch the eggs. A flock of chicks are born, including a black chick which can talk. It struggles to find food, which are almost immediately eaten by the other chicks to his chagrin.

The black chick finds food outside of the fence, lamenting that he cannot fly as he sings the titular song. Two black birds use a corncob to play music, tempting him. To his surprise, the other chicks had fashioned artificial wings out of discarded corsets. He uses it to fly up the fence and uses panties as a parachute to get down. As the chick gorges on peas, a scarecrow plots to protect the property and chase him, only to be outwitted by being hit by a well's lever and burnt by a heater.

== Reception ==
The Motion Picture Herald called it an "an okay cartoon with music and song".
