= The Vikings (radio program) =

The Vikings, a radio program offering vocal renditions and light music, was broadcast by NBC during the late 1920s and early 1930s.

The series starred the Vikings, a male quartet under the direction of William Wirges. The group featured Richard Miller and Robert Perry, tenors; Richard Maxwell, baritone; and Charles Pearson, bass.

Their earliest programs in 1926 aired at 8pm on Tuesday; by 1930, they were heard on Sunday evenings. In a broadcast of October 5, 1930, the Vikings performed "The Old Woman in the Shoe" from the musical comedy Lord Byron of Broadway. Later that month they opened the program with "Bye Bye Blues". In another program, they harmonized on songs from films.

They should not be confused with later music groups also known as the Vikings.
