= Velvet Tone Records =

American record label

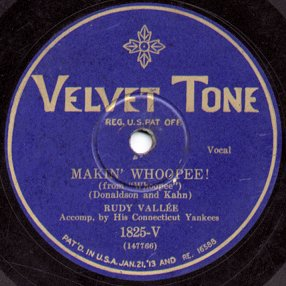
- Label of a Velvet Tone Record, c. 1928, featuring Rudy Vallee
- Parent company: Columbia Records
- Founded: 1925
- Defunct: 1932
- Genre: Jazz
- Country of origin: U.S.

Velvet Tone Records was an American record label that was founded by Columbia Records in 1925 and closed in 1932. Velvet Tone featured material identical to that of Columbia's two other low price labels, Harmony Records and Diva Records (and after Diva was discontinued, Clarion Records).

== Popular culture ==
- In Frank Capra's 1946 film, It's a Wonderful Life, Mary can be seen playing a record with a "Velvet Tone" label on the phonograph. A close examination reveals that it is "Buffalo Gals" performed by "Arthur Black and His Orchestra". However, the label's design is inconsistent with actual Velvet Tone labels. The prop record is a nod towards the film's assistant director, Arthur Black.

== See also ==
- List of record labels
