= Fred Hamm =

American jazz bandleader and singer (1887–1931)

- Born: Frederick Finley Hamm; September 7, 1887; New Point, Missouri, U.S.
- Died: July 14, 1931 (aged 43); Chicago, Illinois, U.S.
- Resting place: Mount Mora Cemetery, St. Joseph, Missouri
- Education: University of North Carolina
- Occupations: Bandleader, arranger
- Years active: 1916 – 1930
- Known for: "Bye Bye Blues"
- Spouse(s): Irene Hastings (m. 1920)
- Children: 2

Frederick Finley Hamm (September 7, 1887 – July 14, 1931) was an American jazz bandleader, arranger, cornetist, singer, and songwriter, perhaps best remembered as co-writer of the song "Bye Bye Blues".

== Early life and career ==
Born on September 7, 1887, in New Point, Missouri, Hamm was the son of Mary (née Thorpe) and Belden Hamm. After his father's death in 1892, the family moved to nearby Oregon, where, as early as June 1896, the then 8-year-old Hamm's vocal skills,—on display during the annual observation of Children's Day at a local church—were duly noted by the Holt County Sentinel.

We would be pleased to give the program were it not so long. We will content ourselves, however, by mentioning some of the features, which were Master Fred Hamm's tenor, showing that he possesses a magnificent voice for so young a child, [and especially] Hamm's solo, 'Don't Sell Him Another Drink.'

In 1918, Hamm graduated from Oregon High School.

In 1925 he took over the leadership of the Benson Orchestra (founded by Edgar Benson). He sang and played the cornet. Among the members of his band were Dave Bennett (who played clarinet and alto saxophone), Chauncey Gray (piano), and Bert Lown (violin). With Bennett, he co-wrote "Bye Bye Blues" in early 1925.

== Personal life ==
In 1920, Hamm was married in Chicago to Mrs. Irene Laura Cook (née Hastings), with whom he had two children, both sons.

On Wednesday, June 14, 1931, following an illness of approximately five months, Hamm, aged 43, died at his home in Chicago. In accordance with his wishes, Hamm's remains are interred at Mount Mora Cemetery, alongside those of his mother.
