= Sean O'Brien =

Sean O'Brien may refer to:

== Sportspeople ==
- Seán O'Brien (Gaelic footballer), Gaelic footballer for Nemo Rangers
- Seán O'Brien (Cork hurler) (1926–?), Irish hurler
- Seán O'Brien (Tipperary hurler), Irish hurler
- Sean O'Brien (ice hockey) (born 1972), American former ice hockey left winger
- Seán O'Brien (rugby union, born 1987), former Irish rugby union international flanker for Leinster and London Irish
- Seán O'Brien (rugby union, born 1994), former Irish rugby union flanker for Connacht
- Seán O'Brien (rugby union, born 1998), Irish rugby union centre / winger for Munster
- Seán O'Brien (rugby union, born 2000), American-born Irish rugby union flanker for Connacht
- Sean O'Brien (windsurfer) (born 1984), Australian windsurfer
- Sean O'Brien (footballer), English footballer

== Other people ==
- Dancing Man (person) (Sean O'Brien, born 1960s), a financier from England
- Sean O'Brien (labor leader) (born 1970s), American
- Sean O'Brien (politician) (born 1969), American jurist
- Sean O'Brien (writer) (born 1952), British poet, critic and playwright
- Sean O'Brien, bassist and original member of Boston rock band Come
- Sean C. O'Brien, co-discoverer of buckminsterfullerene

== See also ==
- John O'Brien (disambiguation)
- Sean O'Bryan (born 1963), American actor
- Shaun O'Brien (disambiguation)
