= My Greatest Mistake =

- Song by Jack Fulton (w&m) and Jack O'Brien (w&m)
- Key: E♭ major
- Genre: Popular, torch song
- Form: AABA
- Written: 1940
- Meter: Moderately slow (with expression)
- Time: 4/4
- Publisher: Bregman, Vocco & Conn, Inc.

"My Greatest Mistake" is a popular song written in 1940 by Jack Fulton and Jack "Bones" O'Brien.

== Comments ==
The original piano and vocal score is in E♭ major. The song was Jack Fulton's first hit. Bregman, Vocco & Conn, Inc., of New York was the publisher. J. R. Lafleur & Son, Ltd. (Boosey & Hawkes), of London was the sole selling agent for the British Empire, except Canada, Newfoundland, and Australia. J. Albert & Son of Sydney was the selling agent for Australia.

=== ASCAP boycott ===
"My Greatest Mistake" was one of some 1,250,000 songs under an ASCAP license. In 1940, ASCAP attempted to double its fees to broadcasters for the airing of licensed songs. For ten months – January 1, 1941, to October 29, 1941 – radio broadcasters, namely NBC and CBS, banned all music licensed by ASCAP. Given the timing of the launch of "My Greatest Mistake," the ASCAP boycott, according to O'Brien, stunted the momentum of the song's rise in popularity for 13 recordings that were released before the boycott.

== Selected discography ==
=== Pre-ASCAP ban ===
1. Larry Clinton's Bluebird Orchestra
  1. Bluebird 10784-A
    Terry Allen (vocalist)
    Recorded June 24, 1940, New York (Note: Larry Clinton Band: June 24, 1940, New York: Larry Clinton (trumpet, tuba, trombone, arranger, leader); Bob Alexy (né Robert James Alexy; 1910–1985), Ivor Lloyd (né Ivor Mark Lloyd; 1911–1988), Jack Palmer (né Joseph J. Palmieri; 1912–2000) (trumpets); George Mazza, Al George (né Alfred A. George; 1910–1977), Jimmy Curry (trombones); Steve Benoric (1912–1976), Ben Feman (né Benjamin C. Feman; 1908–1994) (clarinets, alto saxes); Frank Ludwig (né Francis Ludwig Reudelhuber; 1915–1988), Don Hammond (né William Don Hammond; 1914–1964) (clarinets, tenor saxes); Bill Straub (piano); George Rose (né George August Rose; 1909–1978) (guitar); Hank Wayland (double bass); Charlie Blake (drums); Terry Allen (vocalist))
    Side A matrix: 051556-1
    OCLC 77628941
    (audio at Internet Archive)
2. Orrin Tucker and His Orchestra
  2. Columbia 35622
    Orrin Tucker (vocalist)
    Matrix: WCO 28040
    Recorded July 24, 1940, New York
    OCLC 768494360
3. Frankie Masters
  3. Okeh 5658
    Marion Francis (vocalist)
    (née Marion Francis Charlesworth; 1917–2011)
    Matrix: 26957
    Recorded June 25, 1940 (Note: Frankie Masters Band (partial list): Frankie Masters (director, trombone); "Bud" Shiffman (later "Buddy Shaw;" né Herman Shiffman; 1912–2010) (lead alto sax); Vincent Claude Ferrini (1914–2013) (alto sax); Carl C. Bean (1909–1969) (tenor sax); Howard John Barkell (1903–1971) (bari sax, piano, guitar, drums, bass); Marion Francis (vocals); The Masters Voices (vocals))
4. Duke Ellington
  4. Victor 26719-A
    Matrix 054624-1
    Also released as His Master's Voice B. 9129
    Matrix OA. 054624-1
    (no vocal)
    Recorded July 24, 1940, New York (Note: Duke Ellington Band: July 24, 1940, RCA-Victor, New York, recording session at Studio 2, 155 East 24th Street, Manhattan: Rex Stewart (conductor); Wallace Jones, Cootie Williams (trumpets); Lawrence Brown, Joe Nanton (trombones); Juan Tizol (valve trombone); Barney Bigard (clarinet); Johnny Hodges (alto & soprano sax); Otto Hardwick (alto sax, clarinet); Ben Webster (tenor sax); Harry Carney (baritone & alto sax, clarinet); Duke Ellington (piano); Fred Guy (guitar); Jimmie Blanton (bass); Sonny Greer (drums) ("A Duke Ellington Panorama: 1940 Discography", The Duke Ellington Society, Washington, D.C.))
    OCLC 956509404
    (Audio on YouTube)
  5. Jazz Supreme (It)JS704
    NBC Red broadcast (local station WMAQ)
    Panther Room, basement of the Hotel Sherman, Chicago
    September 10, 1940 (Note: Duke Ellington Band: September 10, 1940, NBC Blue broadcast, Hotel Sherman, Panther Room: (same personnel as Ellington's July 24, 1940, session at RCA-Victor Studio 2 in New York))
5. Harry Roy
  6. Regal Zonophone
    MR 3392
    Matrix (on label): CAR 5906
    Recorded November 1940, London
6. London Piano-Accordion Band
  7. Regal Zonophone
    MR 3423
    Matrix (on label): CAR 5949
7. Harry James
  Dick Haymes (vocalist on all three recordings)
  8. Radio Broadcast, Eastwood Gardens, Detroit, June 30, 1940
  9. Varsity 8389
    Side A matrix 1889
    Also released as Hit 7064
    Side A matrix 1889
    Recorded August 12, 1940, New York
    (audio on YouTube)
  10. Hep (E)88
    Radio Broadcast
    Dancing Campus, Liberty Lake, World's Fair, New York (Note: Mike Todd, a theatrical producer and impresario, ran the four largest and most popular attractions at the 1939 New York World's Fair, three of which were cabarets. The first, he took over George Jessel's Old New York and transformed it into Gay New Orleans – a three-acre park; the second he converted the Hall of Music into the Streets of Paris; the third he created the Old Time Op'ry House on the midway; the fourth, he built the Dancing Campus, reportedly the world's biggest outdoor dance arena, featuring big bands nightly with a floor large enough for 12,000 dancing patrons.)
    September 6, 1940
    OCLC 919190428
    LCCN 2015-625696
8. Dick Todd
  11. Bluebird 10822
    Matrix BS 051591-1
    Recorded August 6, 1940, New York
    (audio on YouTube)
9. Dick Robertson
  12. Decca 3378-A
    Dick Robertson (vocalist)
    Matrix: 68015A
    New York, August 27, 1940, New York
    OCLC 173216584, 173216607, 80746185
11. The Ink Spots
  13. Brunswick 03081-B (catalog number) (1940)
    Matrix (label – Side B): 67990
    Matrix (runout, stamped – Side B): 67990A 1 TT
    Also released as Decca 3379-A
    Matrix (label – Side A): 67990
    Recorded August 20, 1940, New York
    OCLC 173216607, 171137901
    (audio on YouTube)
    (audio at Internet Archive)

=== Post-ASCAP ban ===
12. The Ink Spots
  14. Decca 25237 (matrix / runout)
    3379 A (catalog number)
    Released Aug 1947
    In a compilation album:
    Ink Spots, Volume II
    Decca A-594
    OCLC 48384290
  15. Verve MGV2039
    Recorded September 25, 1956, Los Angeles
13. Willard McDaniel
  16. Crown 129
    Matrix: JB-427
    Recorded 1954, Los Angeles
14. Ben Webster
  With the Ralph Burns Orchestra
  17. Norgan EPN 142
    Recorded September 9, 1955, New York (Note: Ben Webster with the Ralph Burns Orchestra: September 9, 1955, New York: Danny Bank (flute, clarinet); Albert Epstein (1921–2016; clarinet, English horn, bass clarinet); Ben Webster (tenor sax); Hank Jones (piano); Harold Coletta, Martin Donegan, Leo Kruczek (1908–1977), Harry Lookofsky, Gene Orloff, Tosha Samaroff (aka Zama Dworman; né Salmon Dworman; 1906–2005), Paul Winter (violins); Burt Fisch (viola); Abe Borodkin, George Ricci (brother of Ruggiero Ricci), Lucien Schmit (cellos); Chet Amsterdam (né Chester G. Amsterdam; 1926–2010), Wendell Marshall (bass); Osie Johnson (drums); Ralph Burns (arranger; conductor))
    (audio on YouTube)
15. Daniel Romano
  From the album:
  Workin' For The Music Man (2012)
  18. You've Changed (label) YC-006
    OCLC 676770797
    (audio on YouTube)

== Copyrights ==
1. "My Greatest Mistake"
  Jack Fulton (w&m)
  Jack O'Brien (w&m)
  © 26 July 1940
  Class E (published) 85979
  Bregman, Vocco & Conn, Inc., New York (Note: Original copyright: Catalog of Copyright Entries, Part 3 Musical Compositions, New Series, Library of Congress, Copyright Office Vol. 35, Part 2, July 1940, No. 7 (1941), p. 1030)
  Renewal 415380; 4 August 1967 (Note: Copyright renewal: Catalog of Copyright Entries, Music: Current and Renewal Registrations, Third Series, Library of Congress, Copyright Office Vol. 21, Part 5, No. 2, Sec. 1, July-December 1967 (1968), p. 2357)
  (copyright expires 4 August 2034)

=== Library holdings ===
- OCLC 222508119, 47206681

=== Publisher plates ===
- H. 15250

=== Arrangements ===
- Arrangement by Charles E. Hathaway, Jr. (1901–1966)
  George Manning Swing Band Collection
  Box 5/55; No. 353 A, page 13, year 1940
  Eastman School of Music, University of Rochester
  OCLC 880173015

== Lyrics ==
I've done a lot of things that we're right
and though they brought regret
There's only one thing that I'm sorry for
And that's the day we met

My greatest mistake was falling in love
Falling in love with you
My greatest mistake was dreaming of you
And thinking my dreams would come true

It was easy to see
You never loved me
Though I hoped and I prayed
Someday it could be

My greatest mistake
My greatest heartache
Was falling in love with you

Darlin', you know my greatest mistake was falling in love
And I mean falling in love with a beautiful gal like you, mmm
You know I made another mistake, just dreaming of you
And being foolish enough to think that all my dreams was bound to come true

You know, shoulda been easy for me to see
That, honey child, you never loved me
Course, I hoped and I prayed
That maybe someday, it could be

My greatest mistake
My greatest heartache
Was falling in love with you
