= I Get Along Without You Very Well (Except Sometimes) =

1939 song by Hoagy Carmichael

Song
- Published: 1939
- Genre: Popular
- Composer: Hoagy Carmichael
- Lyricist: Jane Brown Thompson (from poem)

"I Get Along Without You Very Well" is a popular song composed by Hoagy Carmichael in 1939, with lyrics based on a poem written by Jane Brown Thompson.

== Background ==
Thompson's identity as the author of the poem was for many years unknown, even to Carmichael; he had been handed the poem anonymously at an event at Indiana University, and the poem only noted the author as "J.B.". Carmichael noted J.B.'s name in the song's sheet music as the author of the poem that inspired the lyrics, and asked for help to identify "J.B.". However, it wasn't until the mid-1950s that a positive identification was made. Jane Brown Thompson died the night before the song was introduced on radio by Dick Powell.

The biggest-selling version was a 1939 recording by Red Norvo and his orchestra (vocal by Terry Allen).

Carmichael and Jane Russell performed the song in the 1952 film noir The Las Vegas Story.

The story of the song was told in a 1957 episode of Telephone Time on ABC television. Carmichael and Walter Winchell, who helped to locate "J. B.", appeared on the program.

== Notable recordings ==
- Dick Todd and his orchestra (recorded February 8, 1939, released by Bluebird Records as catalog number 10150, with the flip side "I Promise You")
- Charlie Barnet and his orchestra (recorded January 20, 1939, released by Bluebird Records as catalog number 10119A, with the flip side "I'm Prayin' Humble")
- Chet Baker – Chet Baker Sings (recorded 1954, released 1956)
- Frank Sinatra – In the Wee Small Hours (1955)
- Karen Chandler – Her Dot single brought the song to #19 on Billboard's 1968 Easy Listening chart.
- Larry Clinton and his orchestra (recorded January 20, 1939, released by Victor Records as catalog number 26151A, with the flip side "The Masquerade Is Over")
- Dorothy Carless - Mixed Emotions (1956)
- The Four Freshmen – Four Freshmen and Five Saxes (1957)
- Sammy Davis Jr. - Mood to Be Wooed (1957) (with Mundell Lowe on guitar)
- Billie Holiday – Lady in Satin (1958)
- Evelyn Knight (released by Decca Records in the United States as catalog number 27992, with the flip side "The Purtiest Little Tree," and in 1953 by Brunswick Records (United Kingdom) as catalog number 05039, with the flip side "Lonesome and Blue")
- Frankie Laine – Torchin' (1958)
- Dirk Bogarde – Lyrics for Lovers (1960)
- Rosemary Clooney – Rosie Solves the Swingin' Riddle! (1960)
- Peggy Lee – If You Go (1961)
- Matt Monro – Matt Monro Sings Hoagy Carmichael (1962)
- June Christy – The Intimate Miss Christy recorded April 1963 https://web.archive.org/web/20120218154042/http://www.belten.freeserve.co.uk/misty/junechri.doc
- Petula Clark – In Other Words (1962)
- Tony Mitchell (released 1957 by Liberty Records as catalog number 55110, with the flip side "Tell Me, Tell Me")
- Red Norvo and his orchestra (vocal by Terry Allen; recorded February 8, 1939, released by Vocalion Records as catalog number 4648, with the flip side "Kiss Me with Your Eyes" and by Conqueror Records as catalog number 9177, with the flip side "Could Be")
- Nina Simone – Nina Simone and Piano (1969)
- The Durutti Column – I Get Along Without You Very Well/Prayer (Factory Records FAC 64, 1983)
- Linda Ronstadt – For Sentimental Reasons (1986)
- Dinah Shore (recorded October 1947, released by Columbia Records as catalog number 38201, with the flip side "I'll Be Seeing You" and as catalog number 38570, with the flip side "Little White Lies")
- Nelson Riddle - Hey...Let Yourself Go! (1957)
- Carly Simon – Torch (1981) - with an orchestral arrangement by Marty Paich. Record World said that Simon's "chilling vocal is the perfect vehicle for the strong lyrics, and Mike Mainieri's sensitive arrangement/production makes it a touching statement."
- Mary Coughlan – Uncertain Pleasures (1990)
- Renato Russo – The Stonewall Celebration Concert (1994)
- Mel Tormé (1998)
- Diana Krall – The Look of Love (2001)
- Tony Bennett – featuring on Bill Charlap's album Stardust (2002)
- Stacey Kent – The Boy Next Door (2003)
- Beegie Adair – The Nearness Of You: Romantic Songs Of Hoagy Carmichael (2005)
- Jamie Cullum – The Pursuit (2009)
- Franck Amsallem – Amsallem Sings (2009)
- Molly Ringwald – Except Sometimes (2013)
- Eliane Elias - I Thought About You (2013)
- Sílvia Pérez Cruz – Granada (2014)
- Marianne Faithfull – Give My Love to London (2014)
- Barry Manilow – Night Songs (2014)
- Kristin Chenoweth – The Art of Elegance (2016)
- Chrissie Hynde - Valve Bone Woe (2019)
