= Philadelphia Jack O'Brien =

American boxer (1878–1942)

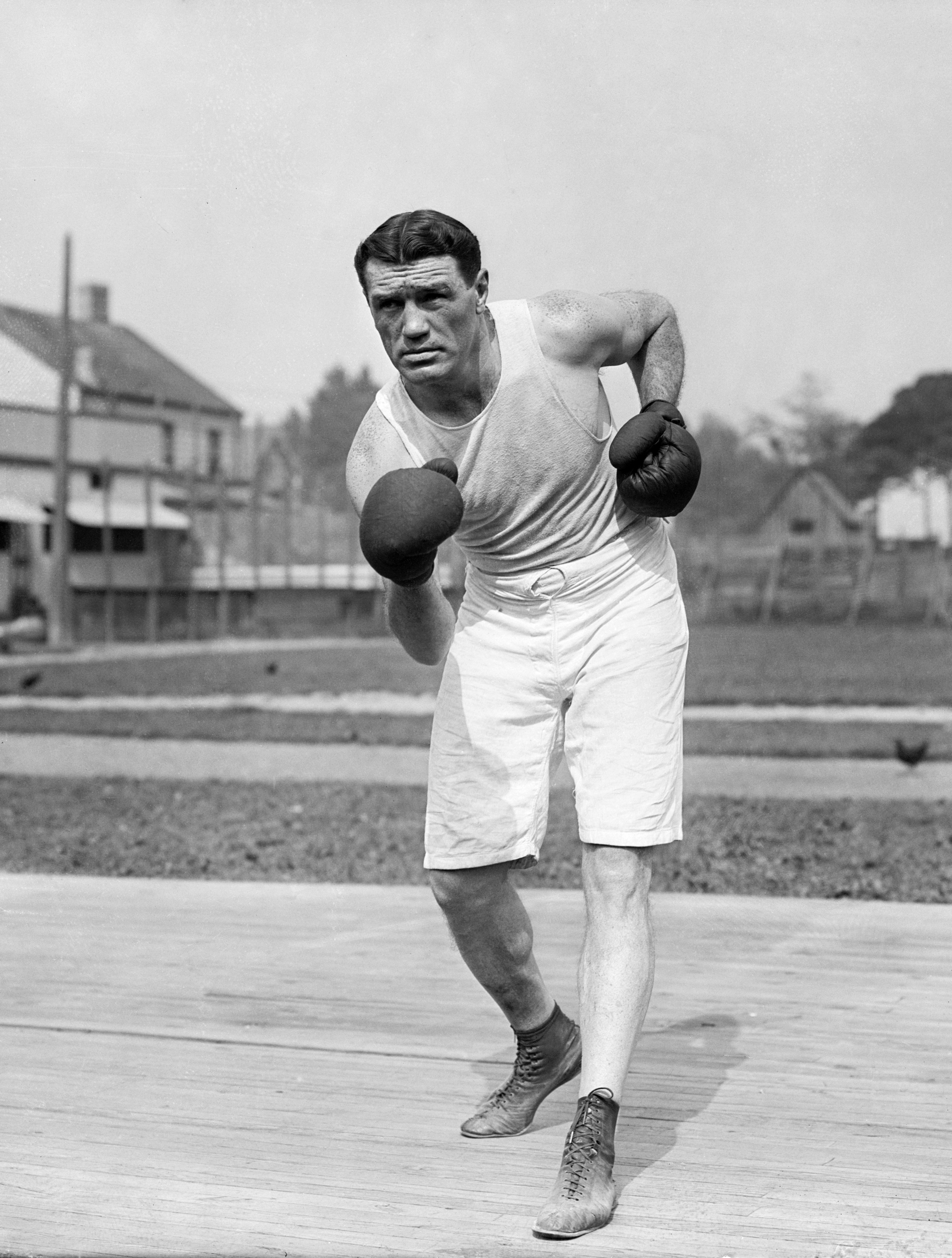
- O'Brien in 1911

Personal information
- Nationality: American
- Born: James Francis Hagan; January 17, 1878 Philadelphia, Pennsylvania
- Died: November 12, 1942 (aged 64)
- Height: 5 ft 10 in (1.78 m)
- Weight: Heavyweight; Light Heavyweight; Middleweight

Boxing career
- Stance: Orthodox

Boxing record
- Total fights: 192
- Wins: 147
- Win by KO: 55
- Losses: 16
- Draws: 24
- No contests: 5

Joseph Francis Hagan (better known as Philadelphia Jack O'Brien) (January 17, 1878 – November 12, 1942) was an American world light heavyweight boxing champion in 1905 when he defeated Bob Fitzsimmons for the universal world title. Rather than defending his title, O'Brien instead abandoned it in order to fight at heavyweight. Nat Fleischer, founder and editor of The Ring Magazine, ranked O'Brien as the No. 2 All-Time Light Heavyweight, and famed boxing promoter Charley Rose ranked him as the No. 3 All-Time Light Heavyweight.

O'Brien was inducted into the Ring Magazine hall of fame in 1968, the World Boxing Hall of Fame in 1987, and the International Boxing Hall of Fame in 1994.

== Biography ==
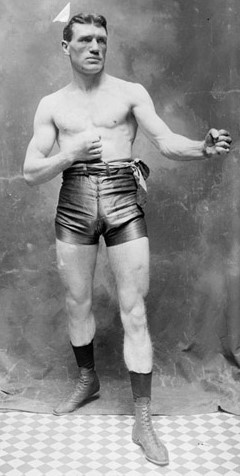
O'Brien in fighting pose

Born in Philadelphia to Irish parents Thomas Hagan and Mary Ryan. Hagan was the older brother to Young Jack O'Brien and the cousin of heavyweight boxer Jack Rowan.

Coinciding with his sixtieth birthday in early 1938, he was profiled in a 5000-word article in The New Yorker by A J Liebling.

O'Brien turned pro in the 1890s. He stood 5-10½ and weighed between 152 and 165 pounds. He was agile, quick and limber, a two-handed puncher who landed often but not a particularly hard hitter. His best punches were a left jab and a hard overhand right, and he was a good defensive fighter who blocked punches well and counterpunched accurately.

Liebling reported that by 1900 he weighed 155 pounds, but with many good men fighting at this weight their talents were at a discount. O'Brien conceived the idea of going to England where, he heard, the competition was softer. He knocked out Dido Plum, the British middleweight champion, in six rounds, and George Crisp, the heavyweight titleholder, in eleven.

O'Brien returned to Philadelphia in May 1902 and on December 20, 1905, won the world light heavyweight championship with a 13-round RTD over Bob Fitzsimmons in San Francisco, California, but abandoned the title without ever defending it. He challenged world heavyweight champion Tommy Burns on November 28, 1906, in Los Angeles, and got a 20-round draw. The referee was former world champion James J. Jeffries. O'Brien challenged Burns again in Los Angeles on May 8, 1907, and this time Burns won the 20-round decision. He fought the fearsome middleweight champion Stanley Ketchel in a 10-round No Decision on March 26, 1909, in which O'Brien was saved by the bell at the end of the 10th round. He fought heavyweight champion Jack Johnson in a six-round No Decision on May 19, but on June 9 he faced Ketchel again and was beaten in three rounds.

Hagan managed a gym on the seventh and top floors of the Rosemont building at 1658 Broadway, New York City, in the late 1920s/early 1930s. World middleweight champion Harry Greb trained at O'Brien's gym, and the only existing films of Greb in action are workouts and sparring with O'Brien.

O'Brien was also the chief second to Jack Dempsey at the 1926 Dempsey-Tunney bout in Philadelphia.

Retiring in 1910, counting newspaper decisions stands at 192 fights 147–16–24 (5 no contests) with 55 knockouts.

== Death ==
He died on November 12, 1942.

== In popular culture ==
Philadelphia Jack O'Brien is a featured character in The Killings of Stanley Ketchel (2005), a novel by James Carlos Blake.

== Professional boxing record ==
All information in this section is derived from BoxRec, unless otherwise stated.

=== Official record ===
| 192 fights | 92 wins | 6 losses |
|---|---|---|
| By knockout | 55 | 3 |
| By decision | 29 | 3 |
| By disqualification | 8 | 0 |
| Draws | 13 | |
| No contests | 5 | |
| Newspaper decisions/draws | 76 | |

All newspaper decisions are officially regarded as “no decision” bouts and are not counted in the win/loss/draw column.

| No. | Result | Record | Opponent | Type | Round | Date | Location | Notes |
|---|---|---|---|---|---|---|---|---|
| 192 | Loss | 92–6–13 (81) | Ben Koch | NWS | 6 | Jun 17, 1910 | American A.C., Philadelphia, Pennsylvania, U.S. | |
| 191 | Loss | 92–6–13 (80) | Harry Ramsey | NWS | 6 | Nov 27, 1910 | American A.C., Philadelphia, Pennsylvania, U.S. | |
| 190 | Loss | 92–6–13 (79) | Sam Langford | TKO | 5 (10) | Aug 15, 1911 | Twentieth Century A.C., New York City, New York, U.S. | |
| 189 | Win | 92–5–13 (79) | Mike Schreck | NWS | 10 | May 2, 1910 | Duquesne Garden, Pittsburgh, Pennsylvania, U.S. | |
| 188 | Loss | 92–5–13 (78) | Al Kaufman | NWS | 6 | Apr 21, 1910 | Duquesne Garden, Pittsburgh, Pennsylvania, U.S. | |
| 187 | Loss | 92–5–13 (77) | Al Kaufman | NWS | 6 | Jan 19, 1910 | National A.C., Philadelphia, Pennsylvania, U.S. | |
| 186 | Win | 92–5–13 (76) | Charley Stevenson | NWS | 6 | Nov 29, 1909 | West End A.C., Philadelphia, Pennsylvania, U.S. | |
| 185 | Win | 92–5–13 (75) | Fireman Jim Flynn | NWS | 6 | Jul 30, 1909 | City Auditorium, Denver, Colorado, U.S. | |
| 184 | Loss | 92–5–13 (74) | Stanley Ketchel | TKO | 3 (6) | Jun 9, 1909 | National A.C., Philadelphia, Pennsylvania, U.S. | |
| 183 | Draw | 92–4–13 (74) | Jack Johnson | NWS | 6 | May 19, 1909 | National A.C., Philadelphia, Pennsylvania, U.S. | World heavyweight title at stake; (via KO only) |
| 182 | Loss | 92–4–13 (73) | Stanley Ketchel | NWS | 10 | Mar 26, 1909 | National A.C., New York City, New York, U.S. | |
| 181 | Win | 92–4–13 (72) | Fred Cooley | PTS | 2 | Jan 4, 1909 | West End A.C., Philadelphia, Pennsylvania, U.S. | |
| 180 | Win | 91–4–13 (72) | George Cole | NWS | 6 | Nov 9, 1908 | West End A.C., Philadelphia, Pennsylvania, U.S. | |
| 179 | Win | 91–4–13 (71) | Tom Lenihan | TKO | 4 (6) | Sep 25, 1908 | Ontario A.C., Philadelphia, Pennsylvania, U.S. | |
| 178 | Win | 90–4–13 (71) | Larry Temple | NWS | 6 | Sep 7, 1908 | West End A.C., Philadelphia, Pennsylvania, U.S. | |
| 177 | Win | 90–4–13 (70) | Jack Rush | KO | 7 (?) | Aug 29, 1908 | Clarksburg, West Virginia, U.S. | |
| 176 | Win | 89–4–13 (70) | Jack Blackburn | NWS | 6 | Jun 10, 1908 | National A.C., Philadelphia, Pennsylvania, U.S. | |
| 175 | Win | 89–4–13 (69) | Jack Bonner | NWS | 6 | Mar 2, 1908 | West End A.C., Philadelphia, Pennsylvania, U.S. | |
| 174 | Draw | 89–4–13 (68) | Bob Ward | PTS | 10 | Feb 11, 1908 | Charleston, West Virginia, U.S. | |
| 173 | Win | 89–4–12 (68) | Bill Heveron | KO | 1 (6) | Dec 13, 1907 | Industrial Hall, Philadelphia, Pennsylvania, U.S. | |
| 172 | Loss | 88–4–12 (68) | Tommy Burns | PTS | 20 | May 8, 1907 | Naud Junction Pavilion, Los Angeles, California, U.S. | For world heavyweight title |
| 171 | Win | 88–3–12 (68) | Abdul 'The Turk' Malgan | DQ | 5 (6) | Feb 22, 1907 | Naud Junction Pavilion, Los Angeles, California, U.S. | |
| 170 | Draw | 87–3–12 (68) | Tommy Burns | PTS | 20 | Nov 28, 1906 | Naud Junction Pavilion, Los Angeles, California, U.S. | For world heavyweight title |
| 169 | Win | 87–3–11 (68) | Fred Cooley | KO | 3 (10) | Oct 16, 1906 | Naud Junction Pavilion, Los Angeles, California, U.S. | |
| 168 | Win | 86–3–11 (68) | Jim Tremble | KO | 9 (10) | Oct 16, 1906 | Naud Junction Pavilion, Los Angeles, California, U.S. | |
| 167 | Win | 85–3–11 (68) | Ted Beecham | KO | 2 (?) | Aug 20, 1906 | New Castle, Pennsylvania, U.S. | |
| 166 | Draw | 84–3–11 (68) | Sam Berger | NWS | 6 | Jul 16, 1906 | Woodward's Pavilion, San Francisco, California, U.S. | |
| 165 | Win | 84–3–11 (67) | Bob Fitzsimmons | RTD | 13 (20) | Dec 20, 1905 | Woodward's Pavilion, San Francisco, California, U.S. | Won world light-heavyweight title |
| 164 | Win | 83–3–11 (67) | Al Kaufman | KO | 17 (20) | Oct 27, 1905 | Woodward's Pavilion, San Francisco, California, U.S. | |
| 163 | Win | 82–3–11 (67) | Bill Bates | DQ | 6 (?) | Sep 9, 1905 | Fairbanks, Alaska | |
| 162 | Win | 81–3–11 (67) | Bill Bates | PTS | 10 | Aug 31, 1905 | Dawson City, Yukon Territory, Canada | |
| 161 | Draw | 80–3–11 (67) | Jack Twin Sullivan | PTS | 20 | Jul 4, 1905 | Dawson City, Yukon Territory, Canada | |
| 160 | Loss | 80–3–10 (67) | Hugo Kelly | PTS | 10 | Apr 25, 1905 | Auditorium, Indianapolis, Indiana, U.S. | Lost world middleweight title claim |
| 159 | Win | 80–2–10 (67) | Young Peter Jackson | PTS | 10 | Apr 7, 1905 | 4th Regiment Armory, Baltimore, Maryland, U.S. | Retained world middleweight title claim |
| 158 | Win | 79–2–10 (67) | Young Peter Jackson | DQ | 2 (15) | Mar 24, 1905 | 4th Regiment Armory, Baltimore, Maryland, U.S. | Retained world middleweight title claim; Jackson accidentally knocked out referee O'Hara as he was breaking a clinch between the fighters |
| 157 | Win | 78–2–10 (67) | John Willie | NWS | 6 | Feb 1, 1905 | National A.C., Philadelphia, Pennsylvania, U.S. | |
| 156 | Win | 78–2–10 (66) | Morris Harris | NWS | 6 | Dec 19, 1904 | Washington S.C., Philadelphia, Pennsylvania, U.S. | |
| 155 | Win | 78–2–10 (65) | Larry Temple | NWS | 6 | Dec 10, 1904 | National A.C., Philadelphia, Pennsylvania, U.S. | |
| 154 | Win | 78–2–10 (64) | Black Bill | NWS | 6 | Nov 18, 1904 | Manhattan A.C., Philadelphia, Pennsylvania, U.S. | |
| 153 | Win | 78–2–10 (63) | Dixie Kid | NWS | 6 | Nov 12, 1904 | National A.C., Philadelphia, Pennsylvania, U.S. | |
| 152 | Win | 78–2–10 (62) | John Willie | NWS | 6 | Nov 9, 1904 | National A.C., Philadelphia, Pennsylvania, U.S. | |
| 151 | Win | 78–2–10 (61) | Jim Jeffords | KO | 3 (15) | Oct 21, 1904 | Eureka A.C., Baltimore, Maryland, U.S. | |
| 150 | Win | 77–2–10 (61) | Tommy Burns | NWS | 6 | Oct 7, 1904 | Panorama Building, Milwaukee, Wisconsin, U.S. | |
| 149 | Win | 77–2–10 (60) | Joe Butler | KO | 1 (6) | Sep 29, 1904 | Broadway A.C., Philadelphia, Pennsylvania, U.S. | |
| 148 | Win | 76–2–10 (60) | Billy Stift | KO | 2 (15) | Sep 23, 1904 | Germania Maennerchor Hall, Baltimore, Maryland, U.S. | |
| 147 | Win | 75–2–10 (60) | Hugo Kelly | NWS | 6 | Sep 13, 1904 | National A.C., Philadelphia, Pennsylvania, U.S. | |
| 146 | Loss | 75–2–10 (59) | Bob Fitzsimmons | NWS | 6 | Jul 23, 1904 | Baker Bowl, Philadelphia, Pennsylvania, U.S. | |
| 145 | Win | 75–2–10 (58) | George Cole | NWS | 6 | May 25, 1904 | National A.C., Philadelphia, Pennsylvania, U.S. | |
| 144 | Draw | 75–2–10 (57) | Charles Kid McCoy | NWS | 6 | May 14, 1904 | 2nd Regiment Armory, Philadelphia, Pennsylvania, U.S. | |
| 143 | Win | 75–2–10 (56) | Kid Carter | TKO | 3 (?) | Apr 26, 1904 | West End A.C., Saint Louis, Missouri, U.S. | Police intervened |
| 142 | Win | 74–2–10 (56) | Jack Twin Sullivan | KO | 3 (20) | Apr 14, 1904 | West End A.C., Saint Louis, Missouri, U.S. | Retained world middleweight title claim |
| 141 | Win | 73–2–10 (56) | Hugo Kelly | PTS | 6 | Mar 18, 1904 | Battery D Armory, Chicago, Illinois, U.S. | |
| 140 | Win | 72–2–10 (56) | Mike Schreck | PTS | 15 | Mar 10, 1904 | West End A.C., Saint Louis, Missouri, U.S. | |
| 139 | Win | 71–2–10 (56) | Charles Mack | TKO | 3 (?) | Feb 22, 1904 | Watita Hall, Chicago, Illinois, U.S. | |
| 138 | Draw | 70–2–10 (56) | Tommy Ryan | NWS | 6 | Jan 27, 1904 | National A.C., Philadelphia, Pennsylvania, U.S. | |
| 137 | Draw | 70–2–10 (55) | Hugo Kelly | PTS | 10 | Dec 29, 1903 | Vineyard's Hall, Kansas City, Missouri, U.S. | |
| 136 | Win | 70–2–9 (55) | Jim Jeffords | NWS | 6 | Dec 24, 1903 | Broadway A.C., Philadelphia, Pennsylvania, U.S. | |
| 135 | Win | 70–2–9 (54) | Jack Twin Sullivan | PTS | 15 | Dec 22, 1903 | Criterion A.C., Boston, Massachusetts, U.S. | Claimed vacant world middleweight title |
| 134 | Win | 69–2–9 (54) | Diamond Dick Torpey | PTS | 6 | Dec 18, 1903 | Chicago A.A., Chicago, Illinois, U.S. | |
| 133 | Win | 68–2–9 (54) | Mike Schreck | PTS | 6 | Dec 12, 1903 | Chicago A.A., Chicago, Illinois, U.S. | |
| 132 | Win | 67–2–9 (54) | Jack Williams | KO | 3 (6) | Dec 5, 1903 | National A.C., Philadelphia, Pennsylvania, U.S. | |
| 131 | Win | 66–2–9 (54) | Jack Twin Sullivan | NWS | 6 | Nov 18, 1903 | National A.C., Philadelphia, Pennsylvania, U.S. | |
| 130 | Win | 66–2–9 (53) | Bill Heveron | KO | 4 (15) | Oct 26, 1903 | Ginnetts Circus, Newcastle, Tyne and Wear, England | |
| 129 | Win | 65–2–9 (53) | Jack Mullen | RTD | 8 (10) | Oct 12, 1903 | Ginnetts Circus, Newcastle, Tyne and Wear, England | |
| 128 | Win | 64–2–9 (53) | Charlie Haghey | KO | 3 (20) | Sep 21, 1903 | Ginnetts Circus, Newcastle, Tyne and Wear, England | |
| 127 | Win | 63–2–9 (53) | Paddy Sheehan | NWS | 6 | Jul 21, 1903 | Bethlehem, Pennsylvania, U.S. | |
| 126 | Win | 63–2–9 (52) | Jim Jeffords | NWS | 6 | Jul 11, 1903 | Southern A.C., Philadelphia, Pennsylvania, U.S. | |
| 125 | Win | 63–2–9 (51) | Kid Carter | NWS | 6 | Jul 1, 1903 | Industrial Hall, Philadelphia, Pennsylvania, U.S. | |
| 124 | Win | 63–2–9 (50) | Jack Bonner | NWS | 10 | Jun 24, 1903 | Mauch Chunk, Pennsylvania, U.S. | |
| 123 | Win | 63–2–9 (49) | Jack Williams | NWS | 6 | May 26, 1903 | Southern A.C., Philadelphia, Pennsylvania, U.S. | |
| 122 | Win | 63–2–9 (48) | George Byers | NWS | 6 | May 23, 1903 | National A.C., Philadelphia, Pennsylvania, U.S. | |
| 121 | Win | 63–2–9 (47) | George Feeley | KO | 3 (6) | May 14, 1903 | Broadway A.C., Philadelphia, Pennsylvania, U.S. | |
| 120 | Loss | 62–2–9 (47) | Marvin Hart | NWS | 6 | May 5, 1903 | Penn Art Club, Philadelphia, Pennsylvania, U.S. | |
| 119 | Draw | 62–2–9 (46) | Barbados Joe Walcott | PTS | 10 | Apr 20, 1903 | Health & Physical Culture A.C., Boston, Massachusetts, U.S. | Pre-arranged draw if lasting the distance |
| 118 | Win | 62–2–8 (46) | Joe Choynski | NWS | 6 | Mar 30, 1903 | Washington S.C., Philadelphia, Pennsylvania, U.S. | |
| 117 | Win | 62–2–8 (45) | Billy Payne | TKO | 2 (6) | Mar 19, 1903 | Broadway A.C., Philadelphia, Pennsylvania, U.S. | |
| 116 | Win | 61–2–8 (45) | Jim Jeffords | PTS | 10 | Mar 9, 1903 | Masonic Hall, Pittsburgh, Pennsylvania, U.S. | |
| 115 | Win | 60–2–8 (45) | Jack Butler | NWS | 6 | Mar 5, 1903 | Lancaster, Pennsylvania, U.S. | |
| 114 | Win | 60–2–8 (44) | Al Weinig | TKO | 4 (6) | Feb 26, 1903 | Broadway A.C., Philadelphia, Pennsylvania, U.S. | |
| 113 | Win | 59–2–8 (44) | Joe Grim | NWS | 6 | Jan 8, 1903 | Broadway A.C., Philadelphia, Pennsylvania, U.S. | |
| 112 | Win | 59–2–8 (43) | Al Weinig | KO | 12 (20) | Jan 1, 1903 | International A.C., Fort Erie, Ontario, Canada | |
| 111 | Win | 58–2–8 (43) | Jimmy Watts | KO | 4 (6) | Dec 18, 1902 | Broadway A.C., Philadelphia, Pennsylvania, U.S. | |
| 110 | Win | 57–2–8 (43) | Charlie McKeever | NWS | 6 | Dec 15, 1902 | Washington S.C., Philadelphia, Pennsylvania, U.S. | |
| 109 | Win | 57–2–8 (42) | Marvin Hart | NWS | 6 | Nov 19, 1902 | Penn Art Club, Philadelphia, Pennsylvania, U.S. | |
| 108 | Win | 57–2–8 (41) | Peter Maher | NWS | 6 | Oct 30, 1902 | Penn Art Club, Philadelphia, Pennsylvania, U.S. | |
| 107 | Win | 57–2–8 (40) | Jim Jeffords | NWS | 6 | Oct 23, 1902 | Broadway A.C., Philadelphia, Pennsylvania, U.S. | |
| 106 | Win | 57–2–8 (39) | Peter Maher | NWS | 6 | Oct 3, 1902 | Ariel A.C., Philadelphia, Pennsylvania, U.S. | |
| 105 | Win | 57–2–8 (38) | Joe Choynski | PTS | 6 | Sep 29, 1902 | America A.C., Chicago, Illinois, U.S. | |
| 104 | Win | 56–2–8 (38) | Billy Stift | PTS | 6 | Sep 12, 1902 | Apollo Hall, Chicago, Illinois, U.S. | |
| 103 | Win | 55–2–8 (38) | Jack Lewis | KO | 1 (?) | Jul 29, 1902 | Mount Clemens, Michigan, U.S. | |
| 102 | Win | 54–2–8 (38) | Jim Driscoll | PTS | 6 | Jun 30, 1902 | America A.C., Chicago, Illinois, U.S. | |
| 101 | Win | 53–2–8 (38) | Jack Beauscholte | PTS | 6 | Jun 30, 1902 | America A.C., Chicago, Illinois, U.S. | |
| 100 | Win | 52–2–8 (38) | Yank Kenny | KO | 3 (6) | Jun 20, 1902 | Globe Theater, Philadelphia, Pennsylvania, U.S. | |
| 99 | ND | 51–2–8 (38) | Jack Bonner | ND | 6 | Jun 16, 1902 | Turn Hall, Paterson, New Jersey, U.S. | |
| 98 | Win | 51–2–8 (37) | George Cole | NWS | 6 | Jun 12, 1902 | Broadway A.C., Philadelphia, Pennsylvania, U.S. | |
| 97 | Win | 51–2–8 (36) | Al Neill | KO | 3 (6) | Jun 6, 1902 | Wabash A.C., Chicago, Illinois U.S. | |
| 96 | Win | 50–2–8 (36) | Charlie McKeever | KO | 1 (6) | Jun 2, 1902 | Industrial Hall, Philadelphia, Pennsylvania, U.S. | |
| 95 | Win | 49–2–8 (36) | Jack Bonner | NWS | 6 | May 23, 1902 | Golden Gate A.C., Philadelphia, Pennsylvania, U.S. | |
| 94 | Win | 49–2–8 (35) | Tom Lenihan | TKO | 2 (3) | May 10, 1902 | Central A.C., Philadelphia, Pennsylvania, U.S. | |
| 93 | Win | 48–2–8 (35) | Jack Williams | NWS | 3 | May 10, 1902 | Central A.C., Philadelphia, Pennsylvania, U.S. | |
| 92 | Win | 48–2–8 (34) | George Cole | TKO | 4 (6) | May 3, 1902 | National A.C., Philadelphia, Pennsylvania, U.S. | |
| 91 | Win | 47–2–8 (34) | Young Peter Jackson | NWS | 6 | Apr 28, 1902 | Washington S.C., Philadelphia, Pennsylvania, U.S. | |
| 90 | Win | 47–2–8 (33) | Barbados Joe Walcott | NWS | 6 | Apr 11, 1902 | Industrial Hall, Philadelphia, Pennsylvania, U.S. | |
| 89 | Win | 47–2–8 (32) | Charlie McKeever | NWS | 6 | Apr 1, 1902 | Industrial Hall, Philadelphia, Pennsylvania, U.S. | |
| 88 | Win | 47–2–8 (31) | Jack McCann | KO | 2 (6) | Mar 26, 1902 | Bijou Theater, Reading, Pennsylvania, U.S. | |
| 87 | Win | 46–2–8 (31) | Mahoney | TKO | 3 (?) | Mar 26, 1902 | Bijou Theater, Reading, Pennsylvania, U.S. | |
| 86 | Win | 45–2–8 (31) | Rufus Graham | NWS | 6 | Mar 20, 1902 | Broadway A.C., Philadelphia, Pennsylvania, U.S. | |
| 85 | Win | 45–2–8 (30) | Ed Denfass | TKO | 5 (6) | Mar 19, 1902 | Penn Art Club, Philadelphia, Pennsylvania, U.S. | |
| 84 | Win | 44–2–8 (30) | Charlie McKeever | NWS | 6 | Mar 10, 1902 | Washington A.C., Philadelphia, Pennsylvania, U.S. | |
| 83 | Win | 44–2–8 (29) | Andy Walsh | TKO | 3 (6) | Mar 3, 1902 | Penn Art Club, Philadelphia, Pennsylvania, U.S. | |
| 82 | Win | 43–2–8 (29) | Yank Kenny | DQ | 4 (6) | Feb 1, 1902 | The Circus, West Hartlepool, County Durham, England | |
| 81 | Win | 42–2–8 (29) | Charlie McKeever | DQ | 3 (15) | Jan 27, 1902 | Leeds and County Athletic Club, Leeds, Yorkshire, England | Retained English middleweight title |
| 80 | Win | 41–2–8 (29) | Pat McDonald | TKO | 2 (6) | Jan 20, 1902 | Gymnasium, Charing Cross, Glasgow, Scotland | |
| 79 | Win | 40–2–8 (29) | J Kearny | KO | 1 (6) | Jan 20, 1902 | Gymnasium, Charing Cross, Glasgow, Scotland | |
| 78 | Win | 39–2–8 (29) | Yank Kenny | TKO | 4 (15) | Dec 12, 1901 | Adelphi Theatre, Liverpool, Merseyside, England | Retained English middleweight title |
| 77 | Win | 38–2–8 (29) | Frank Craig | DQ | 7 (10) | Nov 18, 1901 | National Sporting Club, Covent Garden, London, England | |
| 76 | Win | 37–2–8 (29) | Jack Scales | KO | 1 (20) | Nov 7, 1901 | Liverpool Gymnastic Club, Liverpool, Merseyside, England | |
| 75 | Win | 36–2–8 (29) | Harry Smith | KO | 3 (10) | Sep 28, 1901 | Leeds and County Athletic Club, Leeds, Yorkshire, England | |
| 74 | Win | 35–2–8 (29) | Andrew Cock Robin | KO | 3 (10) | Sep 28, 1901 | Leeds and County Athletic Club, Leeds, Yorkshire, England | |
| 73 | Win | 34–2–8 (29) | Jack McDonald | KO | 1 (?) | Sep 23, 1901 | Coronation Hall, Liverpool, Merseyside, England | |
| 72 | Win | 33–2–8 (29) | Jasper White | KO | 2 (?) | Sep 23, 1901 | Coronation Hall, Liverpool, Merseyside, England | |
| 71 | Win | 32–2–8 (29) | Mick Lynch | KO | 3 (12) | Sep 7, 1901 | West Hartlepool Gymnasium, West Hartlepool, County Durham, England | |
| 70 | Win | 31–2–8 (29) | Dido Plumb | KO | 6 (15) | Aug 19, 1901 | Ginnetts Circus, Newcastle, Tyne and Wear, England | Won English middleweight title |
| 69 | Win | 30–2–8 (29) | Jack Scales | PTS | 6 | Aug 3, 1901 | Ginnetts Circus, Newcastle, Tyne and Wear, England | |
| 68 | Win | 29–2–8 (29) | Harry Neumier | KO | 6 (20) | Jun 25, 1901 | Ginnetts Circus, Newcastle, Tyne and Wear, England | |
| 67 | Win | 28–2–8 (29) | George Chrisp | KO | 11 (20) | May 20, 1901 | Ginnetts Circus, Newcastle, Tyne and Wear, England | |
| 66 | Win | 27–2–8 (29) | Lachie Thomson | KO | 2 (20) | Mar 20, 1901 | Ginnetts Circus, Newcastle, Tyne and Wear, England | |
| 65 | Win | 26–2–8 (29) | Harry Smith | TKO | 4 (15) | Feb 25, 1901 | Ginnetts Circus, Newcastle, Tyne and Wear, England | |
| 64 | Win | 25–2–8 (29) | Jimmy Handler | TKO | 6 (6) | Nov 12, 1900 | Penn Art Club, Philadelphia, Pennsylvania, U.S. | |
| 63 | ND | 24–2–8 (29) | Billy Payne | ND | 6 | Nov 6, 1900 | Star Theater, Philadelphia, Pennsylvania, U.S. | |
| 62 | Win | 24–2–8 (28) | Jimmy Handler | NWS | 6 | Oct 29, 1900 | Penn Art Club, Philadelphia, Pennsylvania, U.S. | |
| 61 | Win | 24–2–8 (27) | Tommy West | NWS | 6 | Oct 15, 1900 | Penn Art Club, Philadelphia, Pennsylvania, U.S. | |
| 60 | Win | 24–2–8 (26) | George Cole | DQ | 10 (20) | Oct 8, 1900 | Trenton A.C., Trenton, New Jersey, U.S. | |
| 59 | Win | 23–2–8 (26) | Jack Bonner | NWS | 6 | Oct 1, 1900 | Penn Art Club, Philadelphia, Pennsylvania, U.S. | |
| 58 | Win | 23–2–8 (25) | Andy Walsh | NWS | 6 | Sep 21, 1900 | Industrial Hall, Philadelphia, Pennsylvania, U.S. | |
| 57 | Draw | 23–2–8 (24) | Jim Adams | PTS | 6 | Jul 3, 1900 | Des Moines, Iowa, U.S. | |
| 56 | NC | 23–2–7 (24) | Jim Adams | NC | 5 (25) | Jun 18, 1900 | Baseball Park, Des Moines, Iowa, U.S. | |
| 55 | Win | 23–2–7 (23) | Jack Lewis | KO | 7 (?) | Jun 14, 1900 | Des Moines, Iowa, U.S. | |
| 54 | Win | 22–2–7 (23) | Charley Bell | KO | 2 (?) | Jun 7, 1900 | Iowa City, Iowa, U.S. | |
| 53 | Win | 21–2–7 (23) | Jack Mahoney | PTS | 6 | May 25, 1900 | Star Theatre, Chicago, Illinois, U.S. | |
| 52 | Win | 20–2–7 (23) | Bob Long | PTS | 6 | Apr 13, 1900 | Chicago, Illinois, U.S. | |
| 51 | Loss | 19–2–7 (23) | Young Peter Jackson | KO | 13 (20) | Feb 14, 1900 | Woodward's Pavilion, San Francisco, California, U.S. | |
| 50 | Draw | 19–1–7 (23) | Al Neill | PTS | 15 | Jan 5, 1900 | Woodward's Pavilion, San Francisco, California, U.S. | |
| 49 | Win | 19–1–6 (23) | Tom Tracey | PTS | 6 | Sep 15, 1899 | Star Theatre, Chicago, Illinois, U.S. | |
| 48 | Win | 18–1–6 (23) | Billy Murray | KO | 3 (?) | Aug 29, 1899 | Auditorium for fistic carnival, Dubuque, Iowa, U.S. | |
| 47 | Win | 17–1–6 (23) | Tom McCune | KO | 12 (?) | Aug 4, 1899 | Jack Leonard's Club, Clinton, Iowa, U.S. | |
| 46 | Win | 16–1–6 (23) | Shorty Ahearn | PTS | 6 | Jul 21, 1899 | Dearborn A.C., Chicago, Illinois, U.S. | |
| 45 | Win | 15–1–6 (23) | Walter Nolan | KO | 4 (?) | Jun 30, 1899 | Star Theatre, Chicago, Illinois, U.S. | |
| 44 | Win | 14–1–6 (23) | Kid Baxter | PTS | 6 | Jun 23, 1899 | Star Theatre, Chicago, Illinois, U.S. | |
| 43 | Win | 13–1–6 (23) | Tony Drew | KO | 7 (20) | May 15, 1899 | Trenton, New Jersey, U.S. | |
| 42 | Win | 12–1–6 (23) | George Cole | PTS | 20 | Mar 20, 1899 | Trenton, New Jersey, U.S. | |
| 41 | Draw | 11–1–6 (23) | Billy Payne | NWS | 4 | Mar 11, 1899 | Philadelphia, Pennsylvania, U.S. | |
| 40 | Win | 11–1–6 (22) | Dick Kelly | NWS | 4 | Mar 11, 1899 | Philadelphia, Pennsylvania, U.S. | |
| 39 | Win | 11–1–6 (21) | Billy Payne | NWS | 8 | Feb 23, 1899 | Philadelphia, Pennsylvania, U.S. | |
| 38 | Draw | 11–1–6 (20) | Jack Collier | NWS | 6 | Jan 28, 1899 | Quaker City A.C., Philadelphia, Pennsylvania, U.S. | |
| 37 | Win | 11–1–6 (19) | George Cole | NWS | 6 | Jan 21, 1899 | Quaker City A.C., Philadelphia, Pennsylvania, U.S. | |
| 36 | Win | 11–1–6 (18) | Fred Stricker | NWS | 4 | Jan 7, 1899 | Quaker City A.C., Philadelphia, Pennsylvania, U.S. | |
| 35 | Draw | 11–1–6 (17) | Tom Cavanaugh | NWS | 4 | Jan 7, 1899 | Quaker City A.C., Philadelphia, Pennsylvania, U.S. | |
| 34 | Win | 11–1–6 (16) | Hugh McWinters | PTS | 20 | Dec 17, 1898 | Pelican A.C., Brooklyn, New York City, New York, U.S. | |
| 33 | Draw | 10–1–6 (16) | Harry Warren | NWS | 6 | Dec 9, 1898 | Arena A.C., Philadelphia, Pennsylvania, U.S. | |
| 32 | Win | 10–1–6 (15) | Kid Carter | DQ | 11 (20) | Nov 26, 1898 | Greenwood A.C., Brooklyn, New York City, New York, U.S. | |
| 31 | Win | 9–1–6 (15) | Billy Payne | NWS | 6 | Aug 12, 1898 | Arena A.C., Philadelphia, Pennsylvania, U.S. | |
| 30 | Win | 9–1–6 (14) | Young Smyrna | NWS | 6 | Apr 15, 1898 | Arena, Philadelphia, Pennsylvania, U.S. | |
| 29 | Win | 9–1–6 (13) | Dick Kelly | PTS | 4 | Apr 10, 1898 | Philadelphia, Pennsylvania, U.S. | Exact date unknown |
| 28 | Win | 8–1–6 (13) | Billy Payne | NWS | 6 | Apr 1, 1898 | Arena, Philadelphia, Pennsylvania, U.S. | |
| 27 | Draw | 8–1–6 (12) | Billy Payne | NWS | 6 | Mar 25, 1898 | Arena A.C., Philadelphia, Pennsylvania, U.S. | |
| 26 | Win | 8–1–6 (11) | Jack McCann | PTS | 3 | Feb 14, 1898 | Philadelphia, Pennsylvania, U.S. | |
| 25 | Draw | 7–1–6 (11) | Wilmington Jack Daly | NWS | 6 | Feb 4, 1898 | Arena, Philadelphia, Pennsylvania, U.S. | |
| 24 | Win | 7–1–6 (10) | Young Smyrna | PTS | 6 | Jan 31, 1898 | Philadelphia, Pennsylvania, U.S. | |
| 23 | Loss | 6–1–6 (10) | Izzy Strauss | NWS | 6 | Jan 29, 1898 | East Side A.C., Philadelphia, Pennsylvania, U.S. | |
| 22 | Win | 6–1–6 (9) | Paddy Sheehan | NWS | 6 | Jan 18, 1898 | Maennerchor Hall, Reading, Pennsylvania, U.S. | |
| 21 | Win | 6–1–6 (8) | Barney Connors | PTS | 8 | Jan 10, 1898 | Baltimore, Maryland, U.S. | Exact date unknown |
| 20 | Win | 5–1–6 (8) | Izzy Strauss | NWS | 6 | Dec 31, 1897 | Arena A.C., Philadelphia, Pennsylvania, U.S. | |
| 19 | Win | 5–1–6 (7) | Joe Dougherty | KO | 3 (?) | Oct 12, 1897 | Philadelphia, Pennsylvania, U.S. | |
| 18 | Draw | 4–1–6 (7) | Martin Judge | PTS | 6 | Jul 26, 1897 | Library Hall, Reading, Pennsylvania, U.S. | |
| 17 | Win | 4–1–5 (7) | Jack Hanlon | PTS | 6 | Jun 27, 1897 | Reading, Pennsylvania, U.S. | |
| 16 | Win | 3–1–5 (7) | Martin Judge | PTS | 6 | Jun 25, 1897 | Reading, Pennsylvania, U.S. | |
| 15 | Draw | 2–1–5 (7) | Paddy Sheehan | PTS | 4 | Jun 9, 1897 | Reading, Pennsylvania, U.S. | |
| 14 | Draw | 2–1–4 (7) | Barney Connors | PTS | 15 | Jun 7, 1897 | Empire Club, Highlandtown, Maryland, U.S. | |
| 13 | Win | 2–1–3 (7) | Charles Bull McCarthy | PTS | 6 | Jun 3, 1897 | Philadelphia, Pennsylvania, U.S. | |
| 12 | Loss | 1–1–3 (7) | Charles Bull McCarthy | NWS | 6 | May 24, 1897 | Quaker City A.C., Philadelphia, Pennsylvania, U.S. | |
| 11 | ND | 1–1–3 (6) | Young Smyrna | ND | 4 | May 4, 1897 | Harmoula Hall, Chester, Pennsylvania, U.S. | |
| 10 | Loss | 1–1–3 (5) | Billy Payne | PTS | 10 | Apr 6, 1897 | Olympic A.C., Athens, Pennsylvania, U.S. | |
| 9 | Loss | 1–0–3 (5) | Leslie Pearce | NWS | 6 | Mar 22, 1897 | Arena, Philadelphia, Pennsylvania, U.S. | |
| 8 | Draw | 1–0–3 (4) | Billy Payne | NWS | 6 | Mar 15, 1897 | Arena, Philadelphia, Pennsylvania, U.S. | |
| 7 | Win | 1–0–3 (3) | Dan McConnell | NWS | 6 | Feb 15, 1897 | Arena, Philadelphia, Pennsylvania, U.S. | |
| 6 | Win | 1–0–3 (2) | Izzy Strauss | NWS | 6 | Feb 8, 1897 | Quaker City A.C., Philadelphia, Pennsylvania, U.S. | |
| 5 | Draw | 1–0–3 (1) | Martin Judge | PTS | 6 | Jan 28, 1897 | Tuxedo A.C., Philadelphia, Pennsylvania, U.S. | |
| 4 | ND | 1–0–2 (1) | Bobby Dobbs | ND | 4 | Jan 11, 1897 | Washita Hall, Conshohocken, Pennsylvania, U.S. | Local newspapers made no mention of an official result |
| 3 | Draw | 1–0–2 | Bobby Dobbs | PTS | 4 | Dec 23, 1896 | Chester, Pennsylvania, U.S. | |
| 2 | Win | 1–0–1 | George Russell | PTS | 6 | Dec 19, 1896 | Nonpareil A.C., Philadelphia, Pennsylvania, U.S. | |
| 1 | Draw | 0–0–1 | Izzy Strauss | PTS | 6 | Dec 14, 1896 | Caledonian A.C., Philadelphia, Pennsylvania, U.S. | |

=== Unofficial record ===
| 192 fights | 147 wins | 16 losses |
|---|---|---|
| By knockout | 55 | 3 |
| By decision | 84 | 13 |
| By disqualification | 8 | 0 |
| Draws | 24 | |
| No contests | 5 | |

Record with the inclusion of newspaper decisions in the win/loss/draw column.

| No. | Result | Record | Opponent | Type | Round | Date | Location | Notes |
|---|---|---|---|---|---|---|---|---|
| 192 | Loss | 147–16–24 (5) | Ben Koch | NWS | 6 | Jun 17, 1910 | American A.C., Philadelphia, Pennsylvania, U.S. | |
| 191 | Loss | 147–15–24 (5) | Harry Ramsey | NWS | 6 | Nov 27, 1910 | American A.C., Philadelphia, Pennsylvania, U.S. | |
| 190 | Loss | 147–14–24 (5) | Sam Langford | TKO | 5 (10) | Aug 15, 1910 | Twentieth Century A.C., New York City, New York, U.S. | |
| 189 | Win | 147–13–24 (5) | Mike Schreck | NWS | 10 | May 2, 1910 | Duquesne Garden, Pittsburgh, Pennsylvania, U.S. | |
| 188 | Loss | 146–13–24 (5) | Al Kaufman | NWS | 6 | Apr 21, 1910 | Duquesne Garden, Pittsburgh, Pennsylvania, U.S. | |
| 187 | Loss | 146–12–24 (5) | Al Kaufman | NWS | 6 | Jan 19, 1910 | National A.C., Philadelphia, Pennsylvania, U.S. | |
| 186 | Win | 146–11–24 (5) | Charley Stevenson | NWS | 6 | Nov 29, 1909 | West End A.C., Philadelphia, Pennsylvania, U.S. | |
| 185 | Win | 145–11–24 (5) | Fireman Jim Flynn | NWS | 6 | Jul 30, 1909 | City Auditorium, Denver, Colorado, U.S. | |
| 184 | Loss | 144–11–24 (5) | Stanley Ketchel | TKO | 3 (6) | Jun 9, 1909 | National A.C., Philadelphia, Pennsylvania, U.S. | |
| 183 | Draw | 144–10–24 (5) | Jack Johnson | NWS | 6 | May 19, 1909 | National A.C., Philadelphia, Pennsylvania, U.S. | World heavyweight title at stake; (via KO only) |
| 182 | Loss | 144–10–23 (5) | Stanley Ketchel | NWS | 10 | Mar 26, 1909 | National A.C., New York City, New York, U.S. | |
| 181 | Win | 144–9–23 (5) | Fred Cooley | PTS | 2 | Jan 4, 1909 | West End A.C., Philadelphia, Pennsylvania, U.S. | |
| 180 | Win | 143–9–23 (5) | George Cole | NWS | 6 | Nov 9, 1908 | West End A.C., Philadelphia, Pennsylvania, U.S. | |
| 179 | Win | 142–9–23 (5) | Tom Lenihan | TKO | 4 (6) | Sep 25, 1908 | Ontario A.C., Philadelphia, Pennsylvania, U.S. | |
| 178 | Win | 141–9–23 (5) | Larry Temple | NWS | 6 | Sep 7, 1908 | West End A.C., Philadelphia, Pennsylvania, U.S. | |
| 177 | Win | 140–9–23 (5) | Jack Rush | KO | 7 (?) | Aug 29, 1908 | Clarksburg, West Virginia, U.S. | |
| 176 | Win | 139–9–23 (5) | Jack Blackburn | NWS | 6 | Jun 10, 1908 | National A.C., Philadelphia, Pennsylvania, U.S. | |
| 175 | Win | 138–9–23 (5) | Jack Bonner | NWS | 6 | Mar 2, 1908 | West End A.C., Philadelphia, Pennsylvania, U.S. | |
| 174 | Draw | 137–9–23 (5) | Bob Ward | PTS | 10 | Feb 11, 1908 | Charleston, West Virginia, U.S. | |
| 173 | Win | 137–9–22 (5) | Bill Heveron | KO | 1 (6) | Dec 13, 1907 | Industrial Hall, Philadelphia, Pennsylvania, U.S. | |
| 172 | Loss | 136–9–22 (5) | Tommy Burns | PTS | 20 | May 8, 1907 | Naud Junction Pavilion, Los Angeles, California, U.S. | For world heavyweight title |
| 171 | Win | 136–8–22 (5) | Abdul 'The Turk' Malgan | DQ | 5 (6) | Feb 22, 1907 | Naud Junction Pavilion, Los Angeles, California, U.S. | |
| 170 | Draw | 135–8–22 (5) | Tommy Burns | PTS | 20 | Nov 28, 1906 | Naud Junction Pavilion, Los Angeles, California, U.S. | For world heavyweight title |
| 169 | Win | 135–8–21 (5) | Fred Cooley | KO | 3 (10) | Oct 16, 1906 | Naud Junction Pavilion, Los Angeles, California, U.S. | |
| 168 | Win | 134–8–21 (5) | Jim Tremble | KO | 9 (10) | Oct 16, 1906 | Naud Junction Pavilion, Los Angeles, California, U.S. | |
| 167 | Win | 133–8–21 (5) | Ted Beecham | KO | 2 (?) | Aug 20, 1906 | New Castle, Pennsylvania, U.S. | |
| 166 | Draw | 132–8–21 (5) | Sam Berger | NWS | 6 | Jul 16, 1906 | Woodward's Pavilion, San Francisco, California, U.S. | |
| 165 | Win | 132–8–20 (5) | Bob Fitzsimmons | RTD | 13 (20) | Dec 20, 1905 | Woodward's Pavilion, San Francisco, California, U.S. | Won world light-heavyweight title |
| 164 | Win | 131–8–20 (5) | Al Kaufman | KO | 17 (20) | Oct 27, 1905 | Woodward's Pavilion, San Francisco, California, U.S. | |
| 163 | Win | 130–8–20 (5) | Bill Bates | DQ | 6 (?) | Sep 9, 1905 | Fairbanks, Alaska | |
| 162 | Win | 129–8–20 (5) | Bill Bates | PTS | 10 | Aug 31, 1905 | Dawson City, Yukon Territory, Canada | |
| 161 | Draw | 128–8–20 (5) | Jack Twin Sullivan | PTS | 20 | Jul 4, 1905 | Dawson City, Yukon Territory, Canada | |
| 160 | Loss | 128–8–19 (5) | Hugo Kelly | PTS | 10 | Apr 25, 1905 | Auditorium, Indianapolis, Indiana, U.S. | Lost world middleweight title claim |
| 159 | Win | 128–7–19 (5) | Young Peter Jackson | PTS | 10 | Apr 7, 1905 | 4th Regiment Armory, Baltimore, Maryland, U.S. | Retained world middleweight title claim |
| 158 | Win | 127–7–19 (5) | Young Peter Jackson | DQ | 2 (15) | Mar 24, 1905 | 4th Regiment Armory, Baltimore, Maryland, U.S. | Retained world and American middleweight title claims; Jackson accidentally knocked out referee O'Hara as he was breaking a clinch between the fighters |
| 157 | Win | 126–7–19 (5) | John Willie | NWS | 6 | Feb 1, 1905 | National A.C., Philadelphia, Pennsylvania, U.S. | |
| 156 | Win | 125–7–19 (5) | Morris Harris | NWS | 6 | Dec 19, 1904 | Washington S.C., Philadelphia, Pennsylvania, U.S. | |
| 155 | Win | 124–7–19 (5) | Larry Temple | NWS | 6 | Dec 10, 1904 | National A.C., Philadelphia, Pennsylvania, U.S. | |
| 154 | Win | 123–7–19 (5) | Black Bill | NWS | 6 | Nov 18, 1904 | Manhattan A.C., Philadelphia, Pennsylvania, U.S. | |
| 153 | Win | 122–7–19 (5) | Dixie Kid | NWS | 6 | Nov 12, 1904 | National A.C., Philadelphia, Pennsylvania, U.S. | |
| 152 | Win | 121–7–19 (5) | John Willie | NWS | 6 | Nov 9, 1904 | National A.C., Philadelphia, Pennsylvania, U.S. | |
| 151 | Win | 120–7–19 (5) | Jim Jeffords | KO | 3 (15) | Oct 21, 1904 | Eureka A.C., Baltimore, Maryland, U.S. | |
| 150 | Win | 119–7–19 (5) | Tommy Burns | NWS | 6 | Oct 7, 1904 | Panorama Building, Milwaukee, Wisconsin, U.S. | |
| 149 | Win | 118–7–19 (5) | Joe Butler | KO | 1 (6) | Sep 29, 1904 | Broadway A.C., Philadelphia, Pennsylvania, U.S. | |
| 148 | Win | 117–7–19 (5) | Billy Stift | KO | 2 (15) | Sep 23, 1904 | Germania Maennerchor Hall, Baltimore, Maryland, U.S. | |
| 147 | Win | 116–7–19 (5) | Hugo Kelly | NWS | 6 | Sep 13, 1904 | National A.C., Philadelphia, Pennsylvania, U.S. | |
| 146 | Loss | 115–7–19 (5) | Bob Fitzsimmons | NWS | 6 | Jul 23, 1904 | Baker Bowl, Philadelphia, Pennsylvania, U.S. | |
| 145 | Win | 115–6–19 (5) | George Cole | NWS | 6 | May 25, 1904 | National A.C., Philadelphia, Pennsylvania, U.S. | |
| 144 | Draw | 114–6–19 (5) | Charles Kid McCoy | NWS | 6 | May 14, 1904 | 2nd Regiment Armory, Philadelphia, Pennsylvania, U.S. | |
| 143 | Win | 114–6–18 (5) | Kid Carter | TKO | 3 (?) | Apr 26, 1904 | West End A.C., Saint Louis, Missouri, U.S. | Police intervened |
| 142 | Win | 113–6–18 (5) | Jack Twin Sullivan | KO | 3 (20) | Apr 14, 1904 | West End A.C., Saint Louis, Missouri, U.S. | Retained world middleweight title claim |
| 141 | Win | 112–6–18 (5) | Hugo Kelly | PTS | 6 | Mar 18, 1904 | Battery D Armory, Chicago, Illinois, U.S. | |
| 140 | Win | 111–6–18 (5) | Mike Schreck | PTS | 15 | Mar 10, 1904 | West End A.C., Saint Louis, Missouri, U.S. | |
| 139 | Win | 110–6–18 (5) | Charles Mack | TKO | 3 (?) | Feb 22, 1904 | Watita Hall, Chicago, Illinois, U.S. | |
| 138 | Draw | 109–6–18 (5) | Tommy Ryan | NWS | 6 | Jan 27, 1904 | National A.C., Philadelphia, Pennsylvania, U.S. | |
| 137 | Draw | 109–6–17 (5) | Hugo Kelly | PTS | 10 | Dec 29, 1903 | Vineyard's Hall, Kansas City, Missouri, U.S. | |
| 136 | Win | 109–6–16 (5) | Jim Jeffords | NWS | 6 | Dec 24, 1903 | Broadway A.C., Philadelphia, Pennsylvania, U.S. | |
| 135 | Win | 108–6–16 (5) | Jack Twin Sullivan | PTS | 15 | Dec 22, 1903 | Criterion A.C., Boston, Massachusetts, U.S. | Claimed vacant world middleweight title |
| 134 | Win | 107–6–16 (5) | Diamond Dick Torpey | PTS | 6 | Dec 18, 1903 | Chicago A.A., Chicago, Illinois, U.S. | |
| 133 | Win | 106–6–16 (5) | Mike Schreck | PTS | 6 | Dec 12, 1903 | Chicago A.A., Chicago, Illinois, U.S. | |
| 132 | Win | 105–6–16 (5) | Jack Williams | KO | 3 (6) | Dec 5, 1903 | National A.C., Philadelphia, Pennsylvania, U.S. | |
| 131 | Win | 104–6–16 (5) | Jack Twin Sullivan | NWS | 6 | Nov 18, 1903 | National A.C., Philadelphia, Pennsylvania, U.S. | |
| 130 | Win | 103–6–16 (5) | Bill Heveron | KO | 4 (15) | Oct 26, 1903 | Ginnetts Circus, Newcastle, Tyne and Wear, England | |
| 129 | Win | 102–6–16 (5) | Jack Mullen | RTD | 8 (10) | Oct 12, 1903 | Ginnetts Circus, Newcastle, Tyne and Wear, England | |
| 128 | Win | 101–6–16 (5) | Charlie Haghey | KO | 3 (20) | Sep 21, 1903 | Ginnetts Circus, Newcastle, Tyne and Wear, England | |
| 127 | Win | 100–6–16 (5) | Paddy Sheehan | NWS | 6 | Jul 21, 1903 | Bethlehem, Pennsylvania, U.S. | |
| 126 | Win | 99–6–16 (5) | Jim Jeffords | NWS | 6 | Jul 11, 1903 | Southern A.C., Philadelphia, Pennsylvania, U.S. | |
| 125 | Win | 98–6–16 (5) | Kid Carter | NWS | 6 | Jul 1, 1903 | Industrial Hall, Philadelphia, Pennsylvania, U.S. | |
| 124 | Win | 97–6–16 (5) | Jack Bonner | NWS | 10 | Jun 24, 1903 | Mauch Chunk, Pennsylvania, U.S. | |
| 123 | Win | 96–6–16 (5) | Jack Williams | NWS | 6 | May 26, 1903 | Southern A.C., Philadelphia, Pennsylvania, U.S. | |
| 122 | Win | 95–6–16 (5) | George Byers | NWS | 6 | May 23, 1903 | National A.C., Philadelphia, Pennsylvania, U.S. | |
| 121 | Win | 94–6–16 (5) | George Feeley | KO | 3 (6) | May 14, 1903 | Broadway A.C., Philadelphia, Pennsylvania, U.S. | |
| 120 | Loss | 93–6–16 (5) | Marvin Hart | NWS | 6 | May 5, 1903 | Penn Art Club, Philadelphia, Pennsylvania, U.S. | |
| 119 | Draw | 93–5–16 (5) | Barbados Joe Walcott | PTS | 10 | Apr 20, 1903 | Health & Physical Culture A.C., Boston, Massachusetts, U.S. | Pre-arranged draw if lasting the distance |
| 118 | Win | 93–5–15 (5) | Joe Choynski | NWS | 6 | Mar 30, 1903 | Washington S.C., Philadelphia, Pennsylvania, U.S. | |
| 117 | Win | 92–5–15 (5) | Billy Payne | TKO | 2 (6) | Mar 19, 1903 | Broadway A.C., Philadelphia, Pennsylvania, U.S. | |
| 116 | Win | 91–5–15 (5) | Jim Jeffords | PTS | 10 | Mar 9, 1903 | Masonic Hall, Pittsburgh, Pennsylvania, U.S. | |
| 115 | Win | 90–5–15 (5) | Jack Butler | NWS | 6 | Mar 5, 1903 | Lancaster, Pennsylvania, U.S. | |
| 114 | Win | 89–5–15 (5) | Al Weinig | TKO | 4 (6) | Feb 26, 1903 | Broadway A.C., Philadelphia, Pennsylvania, U.S. | |
| 113 | Win | 88–5–15 (5) | Joe Grim | NWS | 6 | Jan 8, 1903 | Broadway A.C., Philadelphia, Pennsylvania, U.S. | |
| 112 | Win | 87–5–15 (5) | Al Weinig | KO | 12 (20) | Jan 1, 1903 | International A.C., Fort Erie, Ontario, Canada | |
| 111 | Win | 86–5–15 (5) | Jimmy Watts | KO | 4 (6) | Dec 18, 1902 | Broadway A.C., Philadelphia, Pennsylvania, U.S. | |
| 110 | Win | 85–5–15 (5) | Charlie McKeever | NWS | 6 | Dec 15, 1902 | Washington S.C., Philadelphia, Pennsylvania, U.S. | |
| 109 | Win | 84–5–15 (5) | Marvin Hart | NWS | 6 | Nov 19, 1902 | Penn Art Club, Philadelphia, Pennsylvania, U.S. | |
| 108 | Win | 83–5–15 (5) | Peter Maher | NWS | 6 | Oct 30, 1902 | Penn Art Club, Philadelphia, Pennsylvania, U.S. | |
| 107 | Win | 82–5–15 (5) | Jim Jeffords | NWS | 6 | Oct 23, 1902 | Broadway A.C., Philadelphia, Pennsylvania, U.S. | |
| 106 | Win | 81–5–15 (5) | Peter Maher | NWS | 6 | Oct 3, 1902 | Ariel A.C., Philadelphia, Pennsylvania, U.S. | |
| 105 | Win | 80–5–15 (5) | Joe Choynski | PTS | 6 | Sep 29, 1902 | America A.C., Chicago, Illinois, U.S. | |
| 104 | Win | 79–5–15 (5) | Billy Stift | PTS | 6 | Sep 12, 1902 | Apollo Hall, Chicago, Illinois, U.S. | |
| 103 | Win | 78–5–15 (5) | Jack Lewis | KO | 1 (?) | Jul 29, 1902 | Mount Clemens, Michigan, U.S. | |
| 102 | Win | 77–5–15 (5) | Jim Driscoll | PTS | 6 | Jun 30, 1902 | America A.C., Chicago, Illinois, U.S. | |
| 101 | Win | 76–5–15 (5) | Jack Beauscholte | PTS | 6 | Jun 30, 1902 | America A.C., Chicago, Illinois, U.S. | |
| 100 | Win | 75–5–15 (5) | Yank Kenny | KO | 3 (6) | Jun 20, 1902 | Globe Theater, Philadelphia, Pennsylvania, U.S. | |
| 99 | ND | 74–5–15 (5) | Jack Bonner | ND | 6 | Jun 16, 1902 | Turn Hall, Paterson, New Jersey, U.S. | |
| 98 | Win | 74–5–15 (4) | George Cole | NWS | 6 | Jun 12, 1902 | Broadway A.C., Philadelphia, Pennsylvania, U.S. | |
| 97 | Win | 73–5–15 (4) | Al Neill | KO | 3 (6) | Jun 6, 1902 | Wabash A.C., Chicago, Illinois U.S. | |
| 96 | Win | 72–5–15 (4) | Charlie McKeever | KO | 1 (6) | Jun 2, 1902 | Industrial Hall, Philadelphia, Pennsylvania, U.S. | |
| 95 | Win | 71–5–15 (4) | Jack Bonner | NWS | 6 | May 23, 1902 | Golden Gate A.C., Philadelphia, Pennsylvania, U.S. | |
| 94 | Win | 70–5–15 (4) | Tom Lenihan | TKO | 2 (3) | May 10, 1902 | Central A.C., Philadelphia, Pennsylvania, U.S. | |
| 93 | Win | 69–5–15 (4) | Jack Williams | NWS | 3 | May 10, 1902 | Central A.C., Philadelphia, Pennsylvania, U.S. | |
| 92 | Win | 68–5–15 (4) | George Cole | TKO | 4 (6) | May 3, 1902 | National A.C., Philadelphia, Pennsylvania, U.S. | |
| 91 | Win | 67–5–15 (4) | Young Peter Jackson | NWS | 6 | Apr 28, 1902 | Washington S.C., Philadelphia, Pennsylvania, U.S. | |
| 90 | Win | 66–5–15 (4) | Barbados Joe Walcott | NWS | 6 | Apr 11, 1902 | Industrial Hall, Philadelphia, Pennsylvania, U.S. | |
| 89 | Win | 65–5–15 (4) | Charlie McKeever | NWS | 6 | Apr 1, 1902 | Industrial Hall, Philadelphia, Pennsylvania, U.S. | |
| 88 | Win | 64–5–15 (4) | Jack McCann | KO | 2 (6) | Mar 26, 1902 | Bijou Theater, Reading, Pennsylvania, U.S. | |
| 87 | Win | 63–5–15 (4) | Mahoney | TKO | 3 (?) | Mar 26, 1902 | Bijou Theater, Reading, Pennsylvania, U.S. | |
| 86 | Win | 62–5–15 (4) | Rufus Graham | NWS | 6 | Mar 20, 1902 | Broadway A.C., Philadelphia, Pennsylvania, U.S. | |
| 85 | Win | 61–5–15 (4) | Ed Denfass | TKO | 5 (6) | Mar 19, 1902 | Penn Art Club, Philadelphia, Pennsylvania, U.S. | |
| 84 | Win | 60–5–15 (4) | Charlie McKeever | NWS | 6 | Mar 10, 1902 | Washington A.C., Philadelphia, Pennsylvania, U.S. | |
| 83 | Win | 59–5–15 (4) | Andy Walsh | TKO | 3 (6) | Mar 3, 1902 | Penn Art Club, Philadelphia, Pennsylvania, U.S. | |
| 82 | Win | 58–5–15 (4) | Yank Kenny | DQ | 4 (6) | Feb 1, 1902 | The Circus, West Hartlepool, County Durham, England | |
| 81 | Win | 57–5–15 (4) | Charlie McKeever | DQ | 3 (15) | Jan 27, 1902 | Leeds and County Athletic Club, Leeds, Yorkshire, England | Retained English middleweight title |
| 80 | Win | 56–5–15 (4) | Pat McDonald | TKO | 2 (6) | Jan 20, 1902 | Gymnasium, Charing Cross, Glasgow, Scotland | |
| 79 | Win | 55–5–15 (4) | J Kearny | KO | 1 (6) | Jan 20, 1902 | Gymnasium, Charing Cross, Glasgow, Scotland | |
| 78 | Win | 54–5–15 (4) | Yank Kenny | TKO | 4 (15) | Dec 12, 1901 | Adelphi Theatre, Liverpool, Merseyside, England | Retained English middleweight title |
| 77 | Win | 53–5–15 (4) | Frank Craig | DQ | 7 (10) | Nov 18, 1901 | National Sporting Club, Covent Garden, London, England | |
| 76 | Win | 52–5–15 (4) | Jack Scales | KO | 1 (20) | Nov 7, 1901 | Liverpool Gymnastic Club, Liverpool, Merseyside, England | |
| 75 | Win | 51–5–15 (4) | Harry Smith | KO | 3 (10) | Sep 28, 1901 | Leeds and County Athletic Club, Leeds, Yorkshire, England | |
| 74 | Win | 50–5–15 (4) | Andrew Cock Robin | KO | 3 (10) | Sep 28, 1901 | Leeds and County Athletic Club, Leeds, Yorkshire, England | |
| 73 | Win | 49–5–15 (4) | Jack McDonald | KO | 1 (?) | Sep 23, 1901 | Coronation Hall, Liverpool, Merseyside, England | |
| 72 | Win | 48–5–15 (4) | Jasper White | KO | 2 (?) | Sep 23, 1901 | Coronation Hall, Liverpool, Merseyside, England | |
| 71 | Win | 47–5–15 (4) | Mick Lynch | KO | 3 (12) | Sep 7, 1901 | West Hartlepool Gymnasium, West Hartlepool, County Durham, England | |
| 70 | Win | 46–5–15 (4) | Dido Plumb | KO | 6 (15) | Aug 19, 1901 | Ginnetts Circus, Newcastle, Tyne and Wear, England | Won English middleweight title |
| 69 | Win | 45–5–15 (4) | Jack Scales | PTS | 6 | Aug 3, 1901 | Ginnetts Circus, Newcastle, Tyne and Wear, England | |
| 68 | Win | 44–5–15 (4) | Harry Neumier | KO | 6 (20) | Jun 25, 1901 | Ginnetts Circus, Newcastle, Tyne and Wear, England | |
| 67 | Win | 43–5–15 (4) | George Chrisp | KO | 11 (20) | May 20, 1901 | Ginnetts Circus, Newcastle, Tyne and Wear, England | |
| 66 | Win | 42–5–15 (4) | Lachie Thomson | KO | 2 (20) | Mar 20, 1901 | Ginnetts Circus, Newcastle, Tyne and Wear, England | |
| 65 | Win | 41–5–15 (4) | Harry Smith | TKO | 4 (15) | Feb 25, 1901 | Ginnetts Circus, Newcastle, Tyne and Wear, England | |
| 64 | Win | 40–5–15 (4) | Jimmy Handler | TKO | 6 (6) | Nov 12, 1900 | Penn Art Club, Philadelphia, Pennsylvania, U.S. | |
| 63 | ND | 39–5–15 (4) | Billy Payne | ND | 6 | Nov 6, 1900 | Star Theater, Philadelphia, Pennsylvania, U.S. | |
| 62 | Win | 39–5–15 (3) | Jimmy Handler | NWS | 6 | Oct 29, 1900 | Penn Art Club, Philadelphia, Pennsylvania, U.S. | |
| 61 | Win | 38–5–15 (3) | Tommy West | NWS | 6 | Oct 15, 1900 | Penn Art Club, Philadelphia, Pennsylvania, U.S. | |
| 60 | Win | 37–5–15 (3) | George Cole | DQ | 10 (20) | Oct 8, 1900 | Trenton A.C., Trenton, New Jersey, U.S. | |
| 59 | Win | 36–5–15 (3) | Jack Bonner | NWS | 6 | Oct 1, 1900 | Penn Art Club, Philadelphia, Pennsylvania, U.S. | |
| 58 | Win | 35–5–15 (3) | Andy Walsh | NWS | 6 | Sep 21, 1900 | Industrial Hall, Philadelphia, Pennsylvania, U.S. | |
| 57 | Draw | 34–5–15 (3) | Jim Adams | PTS | 6 | Jul 3, 1900 | Des Moines, Iowa, U.S. | |
| 56 | NC | 34–5–14 (3) | Jim Adams | NC | 5 (25) | Jun 18, 1900 | Baseball Park, Des Moines, Iowa, U.S. | |
| 55 | Win | 34–5–14 (2) | Jack Lewis | KO | 7 (?) | Jun 14, 1900 | Des Moines, Iowa, U.S. | |
| 54 | Win | 33–5–14 (2) | Charley Bell | KO | 2 (?) | Jun 7, 1900 | Iowa City, Iowa, U.S. | |
| 53 | Win | 32–5–14 (2) | Jack Mahoney | PTS | 6 | May 25, 1900 | Star Theatre, Chicago, Illinois, U.S. | |
| 52 | Win | 31–5–14 (2) | Bob Long | PTS | 6 | Apr 13, 1900 | Chicago, Illinois, U.S. | |
| 51 | Loss | 30–5–14 (2) | Young Peter Jackson | KO | 13 (20) | Feb 14, 1900 | Woodward's Pavilion, San Francisco, California, U.S. | |
| 50 | Draw | 30–4–14 (2) | Al Neill | PTS | 15 | Jan 5, 1900 | Woodward's Pavilion, San Francisco, California, U.S. | |
| 49 | Win | 30–4–13 (2) | Tom Tracey | PTS | 6 | Sep 15, 1899 | Star Theatre, Chicago, Illinois, U.S. | |
| 48 | Win | 29–4–13 (2) | Billy Murray | KO | 3 (?) | Aug 29, 1899 | Auditorium for fistic carnival, Dubuque, Iowa, U.S. | |
| 47 | Win | 28–4–13 (2) | Tom McCune | KO | 12 (?) | Aug 4, 1899 | Jack Leonard's Club, Clinton, Iowa, U.S. | |
| 46 | Win | 27–4–13 (2) | Shorty Ahearn | PTS | 6 | Jul 21, 1899 | Dearborn A.C., Chicago, Illinois, U.S. | |
| 45 | Win | 26–4–13 (2) | Walter Nolan | KO | 4 (?) | Jun 30, 1899 | Star Theatre, Chicago, Illinois, U.S. | |
| 44 | Win | 25–4–13 (2) | Kid Baxter | PTS | 6 | Jun 23, 1899 | Star Theatre, Chicago, Illinois, U.S. | |
| 43 | Win | 24–4–13 (2) | Tony Drew | KO | 7 (20) | May 15, 1899 | Trenton, New Jersey, U.S. | |
| 42 | Win | 23–4–13 (2) | George Cole | PTS | 20 | Mar 20, 1899 | Trenton, New Jersey, U.S. | |
| 41 | Draw | 22–4–13 (2) | Billy Payne | NWS | 4 | Mar 11, 1899 | Philadelphia, Pennsylvania, U.S. | |
| 40 | Win | 22–4–12 (2) | Dick Kelly | NWS | 4 | Mar 11, 1899 | Philadelphia, Pennsylvania, U.S. | |
| 39 | Win | 21–4–12 (2) | Billy Payne | NWS | 8 | Feb 23, 1899 | Philadelphia, Pennsylvania, U.S. | |
| 38 | Draw | 20–4–12 (2) | Jack Collier | NWS | 6 | Jan 28, 1899 | Quaker City A.C., Philadelphia, Pennsylvania, U.S. | |
| 37 | Win | 20–4–11 (2) | George Cole | NWS | 6 | Jan 21, 1899 | Quaker City A.C., Philadelphia, Pennsylvania, U.S. | |
| 36 | Win | 19–4–11 (2) | Fred Stricker | NWS | 4 | Jan 7, 1899 | Quaker City A.C., Philadelphia, Pennsylvania, U.S. | |
| 35 | Draw | 18–4–11 (2) | Tom Cavanaugh | NWS | 4 | Jan 7, 1899 | Quaker City A.C., Philadelphia, Pennsylvania, U.S. | |
| 34 | Win | 18–4–10 (2) | Hugh McWinters | PTS | 20 | Dec 17, 1898 | Pelican A.C., Brooklyn, New York City, New York, U.S. | |
| 33 | Draw | 17–4–10 (2) | Harry Warren | NWS | 6 | Dec 9, 1898 | Arena A.C., Philadelphia, Pennsylvania, U.S. | |
| 32 | Win | 17–4–9 (2) | Kid Carter | DQ | 11 (20) | Nov 26, 1898 | Greenwood A.C., Brooklyn, New York City, New York, U.S. | |
| 31 | Win | 16–4–9 (2) | Billy Payne | NWS | 6 | Aug 12, 1898 | Arena A.C., Philadelphia, Pennsylvania, U.S. | |
| 30 | Win | 15–4–9 (2) | Young Smyrna | NWS | 6 | Apr 15, 1898 | Arena, Philadelphia, Pennsylvania, U.S. | |
| 29 | Win | 14–4–9 (2) | Dick Kelly | PTS | 4 | Apr 10, 1898 | Philadelphia, Pennsylvania, U.S. | Exact date unknown |
| 28 | Win | 13–4–9 (2) | Billy Payne | NWS | 6 | Apr 1, 1898 | Arena, Philadelphia, Pennsylvania, U.S. | |
| 27 | Draw | 12–4–9 (2) | Billy Payne | NWS | 6 | Mar 25, 1898 | Arena A.C., Philadelphia, Pennsylvania, U.S. | |
| 26 | Win | 12–4–8 (2) | Jack McCann | PTS | 3 | Feb 14, 1898 | Philadelphia, Pennsylvania, U.S. | |
| 25 | Draw | 11–4–8 (2) | Wilmington Jack Daly | NWS | 6 | Feb 4, 1898 | Arena, Philadelphia, Pennsylvania, U.S. | |
| 24 | Win | 11–4–7 (2) | Young Smyrna | PTS | 6 | Jan 31, 1898 | Philadelphia, Pennsylvania, U.S. | |
| 23 | Loss | 10–4–7 (2) | Izzy Strauss | NWS | 6 | Jan 29, 1898 | East Side A.C., Philadelphia, Pennsylvania, U.S. | |
| 22 | Win | 10–3–7 (2) | Paddy Sheehan | NWS | 6 | Jan 18, 1898 | Maennerchor Hall, Reading, Pennsylvania, U.S. | |
| 21 | Win | 9–3–7 (2) | Barney Connors | PTS | 8 | Jan 10, 1898 | Baltimore, Maryland, U.S. | Exact date unknown |
| 20 | Win | 8–3–7 (2) | Izzy Strauss | NWS | 6 | Dec 31, 1897 | Arena A.C., Philadelphia, Pennsylvania, U.S. | |
| 19 | Win | 7–3–7 (2) | Joe Dougherty | KO | 3 (?) | Oct 12, 1897 | Philadelphia, Pennsylvania, U.S. | |
| 18 | Draw | 6–3–7 (2) | Martin Judge | PTS | 6 | Jul 26, 1897 | Library Hall, Reading, Pennsylvania, U.S. | |
| 17 | Win | 6–3–6 (2) | Jack Hanlon | PTS | 6 | Jun 27, 1897 | Reading, Pennsylvania, U.S. | |
| 16 | Win | 5–3–6 (2) | Martin Judge | PTS | 6 | Jun 25, 1897 | Reading, Pennsylvania, U.S. | |
| 15 | Draw | 4–3–6 (2) | Paddy Sheehan | PTS | 4 | Jun 9, 1897 | Reading, Pennsylvania, U.S. | |
| 14 | Draw | 4–3–5 (2) | Barney Connors | PTS | 15 | Jun 7, 1897 | Empire Club, Highlandtown, Maryland, U.S. | |
| 13 | Win | 4–3–4 (2) | Charles Bull McCarthy | PTS | 6 | Jun 3, 1897 | Philadelphia, Pennsylvania, U.S. | |
| 12 | Loss | 3–3–4 (2) | Charles Bull McCarthy | NWS | 6 | May 24, 1897 | Quaker City A.C., Philadelphia, Pennsylvania, U.S. | |
| 11 | ND | 3–2–4 (2) | Young Smyrna | ND | 4 | May 4, 1897 | Harmoula Hall, Chester, Pennsylvania, U.S. | |
| 10 | Loss | 3–2–4 (1) | Billy Payne | PTS | 10 | Apr 6, 1897 | Olympic A.C., Athens, Pennsylvania, U.S. | |
| 9 | Loss | 3–1–4 (1) | Leslie Pearce | NWS | 6 | Mar 22, 1897 | Arena, Philadelphia, Pennsylvania, U.S. | |
| 8 | Draw | 3–0–4 (1) | Billy Payne | NWS | 6 | Mar 15, 1897 | Arena, Philadelphia, Pennsylvania, U.S. | |
| 7 | Win | 3–0–3 (1) | Dan McConnell | NWS | 6 | Feb 15, 1897 | Arena, Philadelphia, Pennsylvania, U.S. | |
| 6 | Win | 2–0–3 (1) | Izzy Strauss | NWS | 6 | Feb 8, 1897 | Quaker City A.C., Philadelphia, Pennsylvania, U.S. | |
| 5 | Draw | 1–0–3 (1) | Martin Judge | PTS | 6 | Jan 28, 1897 | Tuxedo A.C., Philadelphia, Pennsylvania, U.S. | |
| 4 | ND | 1–0–2 (1) | Bobby Dobbs | ND | 4 | Jan 11, 1897 | Washita Hall, Conshohocken, Pennsylvania, U.S. | Local newspapers made no mention of an official result |
| 3 | Draw | 1–0–2 | Bobby Dobbs | PTS | 4 | Dec 23, 1896 | Chester, Pennsylvania, U.S. | |
| 2 | Win | 1–0–1 | George Russell | PTS | 6 | Dec 19, 1896 | Nonpareil A.C., Philadelphia, Pennsylvania, U.S. | |
| 1 | Draw | 0–0–1 | Izzy Strauss | PTS | 6 | Dec 14, 1896 | Caledonian A.C., Philadelphia, Pennsylvania, U.S. | |

== See also ==
- List of light heavyweight boxing champions

Awards and achievements
| Preceded by Bob Fitzsimmons | World Light Heavyweight Champion; 20 Dec 1905–1905; Abandoned | Succeeded by Jack Dillon |
