= Jack O'Brien (footballer, born 1893) =

Australian rules footballer

Personal information
- Full name: John Thomas O'Brien
- Born: 17 February 1893; South Melbourne, Victoria
- Died: 7 May 1934 (aged 41); Melbourne, Victoria

Playing career^{1}
| Years | Club | Games (Goals) |
| 1914 | South Melbourne | 2 (2) |
- ^{1} Playing statistics correct to the end of 1914.

John Thomas O'Brien (17 February 1893 – 7 May 1934) was an Australian rules footballer who played with South Melbourne in the Victorian Football League (VFL).
