= Shaun O'Brien (hurler) =

Irish hurler

Personal information
- Native name: Seán Ó Briain (Irish)
- Born: 1996 (age 29–30) Waterford, Ireland

Sport
- Sport: Hurling
- Position: Goalkeeper
Club
- Years: Club
- De La Salle
Club titles
- Waterford titles: 0
Inter-county*
Years	County	Apps (scores)
2020-present	Waterford	4 (0-00)
Inter-county titles
- Munster titles: 0
- All-Irelands: 0
- NHL: 1
- All Stars: 0
- *Inter County team apps and scores correct as of 20:52, 5 April 2022.

Shaun O'Brien (born 1996) is an Irish hurler who plays for Waterford SHC club De La Salle and at inter-county level with the Waterford senior hurling team. He usually lines out as a goalkeeper.

== Career ==
O'Brien first played hurling at juvenile and underage levels with the De La Salle club in Waterford, before progressing to the club's senior team. He lined out in goal when De La Salle were beaten by Ballygunner in the 2019 Waterford SHC final. O'Brien never played in the minor or under-21 grades with Waterford but was drafted onto the senior team during the pre-season Munster League in 2020. He became Waterford's first choice goalkeeper during the 2021 season. O'Brien's inter-county honours include a National Hurling League title in 2022.

== Career statistics ==
As of match played 2 April 2022.

Team	Year	National League			Munster		All-Ireland		Total	
Team	Year	Division	Apps	Score	Apps	Score	Apps	Score	Apps	Score
Waterford	2020	Division 1B	1	0-00	0	0-00	0	0-00	1	0-00
Waterford	2021	Division 1B	2	0-00	0	0-00	4	0-00	6	0-00
Waterford	2022	Division 1A	5	0-00	0	0-00	0	0-00	5	0-00
Career total			8	0-00	0	0-00	4	0-00	12	0-00

== Honours ==
Waterford

- National Hurling League: 2022
