= Jack O'Brien (jazz pianist) =

- Also known as: 16 October 1903
- Born: John Roger O'Brien; October 16, 1903; Lehighton, Pennsylvania
- Died: October 12, 1982 (aged 78) Allentown, Pennsylvania
- Occupations: Jazz pianist, songwriter
- Years active: 1926–1956

Jack "Bones" O'Brien (né John Roger O'Brien; 16 October 1903 – 12 October 1982) was an American jazz pianist and songwriter from Allentown, Pennsylvania. Notably, O'Brien was pianist, composer, and arranger with the Ted Weems orchestra from 1925 through 1941.

== Growing up ==
John Roger O'Brien was born October 16, 1903, in Lehighton, Pennsylvania, to the marriage of Charles William O'Brien (1879–1960) and Anna Lena Fetherolf (1878–1967). He was raised in nearby Allentown. In 1921, O'Brien graduated from Bethlehem Preparatory School in Bethlehem, Pennsylvania. (Note: Bethlehem Preparatory School, in Bethlehem, Pennsylvania, was founded in 1878. It was a boarding school that consisted of an upper school (grades 8–12), lower school (4–8), and primary school. The institution closed in June 1925 under financial duress, and went into bankruptcy following the resignation of its head master, John Mitchell Tuggey (1878–1963). In August 1927, the City of Bethlehem purchased the property, which included three buildings. Its grounds were bounded by 8th and 9th Avenues and Raspberry and West Union Streets.) He went on to Muhlenberg College, where he was in a fraternity, and then to Columbia University, where he studied organ with David McK. Williams (né David McKinley Williams; 1887–1978).

== Career ==
From 1925 to 1941, O'Brien was pianist and arranger with Ted Weems. He began songwriting, exclusively, in 1941. Before playing piano with Ted Weems, O'Brien got an early start with Art Mickley (né Arthur Hazard Mickley; 1900–1978) and His Orchestra, when he was dubbed "Bones." He then was pianist for several years with the Mason-Dixon Orchestra. He then started his own orchestra. Then played piano with Ted Weems for about 15 years. His song, "Remember Me," was once the theme song of Morton Downey.

In 1941, O'Brien co-composed (with Moe Jaffe, and Bert Lee, pseudonym of Bert Lown) "Thumbs Up!" (a.k.a. "British Delivers the Goods"), which became the official theme song of the British War Relief Society. The song went on to become the theme and movie title for the 1943 film, Thumbs Up.

=== ASCAP boycott ===
"My Greatest Mistake" was a hit in 1940 and was one of some 1,250,000 songs under an ASCAP license. In 1940, ASCAP attempted to double its fees to broadcasters for the airing of licensed songs. For ten months – January 1, 1941, to October 29, 1941 – radio broadcasters, namely NBC and CBS, banned all music licensed by ASCAP. Given the timing of the launch of "My Greatest Mistake," the ASCAP boycott, according to O'Brien, stunted the momentum of the song's popularity.

== Selected compositions ==
1. "Remember Me" (© 1932) (ASCAP)
  Gus Kahn (words)
  Jack O'Brien (music)
2. "The Toyland Band" (© 1932) (ASCAP)
  Walter Hirsch (1891–1967) (w&m)
  Ted Weems (w&m)
  Jack O'Brien (w&m)
3. "On the Island of Catalina" (© 1939) (ASCAP)
  Ted Weems (w&m)
  Jack O'Brien (w&m)
  Moe Jaffe (w&m)
4. "My Greatest Mistake" (© 1940) (ASCAP)
  Jack Fulton (w&m)
  Jack O'Brien (w&m)
5. "Moon Over Sun Valley" (© 1940) (ASCAP)
  Ted Weems (w&m)
  Jack O'Brien (w&m)
  Moe Jaffe (w&m)
6. "Thumbs Up" (© 1941)
  Bert Lee (pseudonym of Bert Lown) (w&m)
  Moe Jaffe (w&m)
  Jack O'Brien (w&m)
7. "From One Lonely Heart to Another" (© 1949) (ASCAP)
  Moe Jaffe (words)
  Jack O'Brien (music)
8. Open Up the Bottle (© 1939)
  Moe Jaffe (words)
  Jack O'Brien (music)

== Family ==
John Roger O'Brien was born October 16, 1903, in Lehighton, Pennsylvania, to Charles William O'Brien (1879–1960) and Anna Lena Fetherolf (maiden; 1878–1967)

- O'Brien married Helen Mosten Rusch (1905–1973) on May 8, 1931, in Chicago, with whom he had a son, John Rusch O'Brien.
- O'Brien married Florence Erich Bower (1914–1997) on April 24, 1945, in Lehigh County, Pennsylvania, with whom he had a son, Kevin R. O'Brien.

== Collaborators ==
- Glen Carr, orchestra leader
- Jack Fulton
- Ted Weems
- Bert Lown

== Disambiguation ==
Jack O'Brien of this article is not to be confused with another Jack O'Brien (né John Joseph O'Brien; 1906–1996) from Connecticut, also a jazz pianist, but one who, among other things, performed with the New Yorkers a.k.a. the New Yorkers Tanzorchester, directed by George Carhart, in Berlin in 1927 and 1928 – and in Paris in 1928 with Lud Gluskin (1898–1989).
