= Jack Fulton =

American singer-songwriter

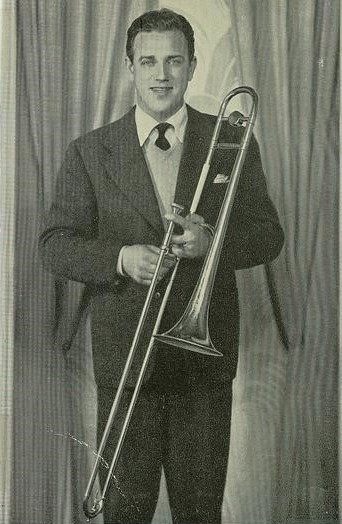

Background information
- Born: John Collins Fulton; June 13, 1903; Philipsburg, Pennsylvania
- Died: November 13, 1993 (aged 90) San Diego, California
- Genres: Jazz
- Occupations: Composer, trombonist, and vocalist
- Instruments: Trombone and tenor voice

John Collins Fulton (June 13, 1903 – November 13, 1993) was an American composer, trombonist, and vocalist. At the age of 17, he started playing the trombone for small-town dances. He sang with the Mason-Dixon Orchestra. He also played the trombone and sang with the George Olsen Orchestra. He was part of the trio that sang on the 1925 number one hit "Who?" The other vocalists were Bob Rice and Fran Frey.

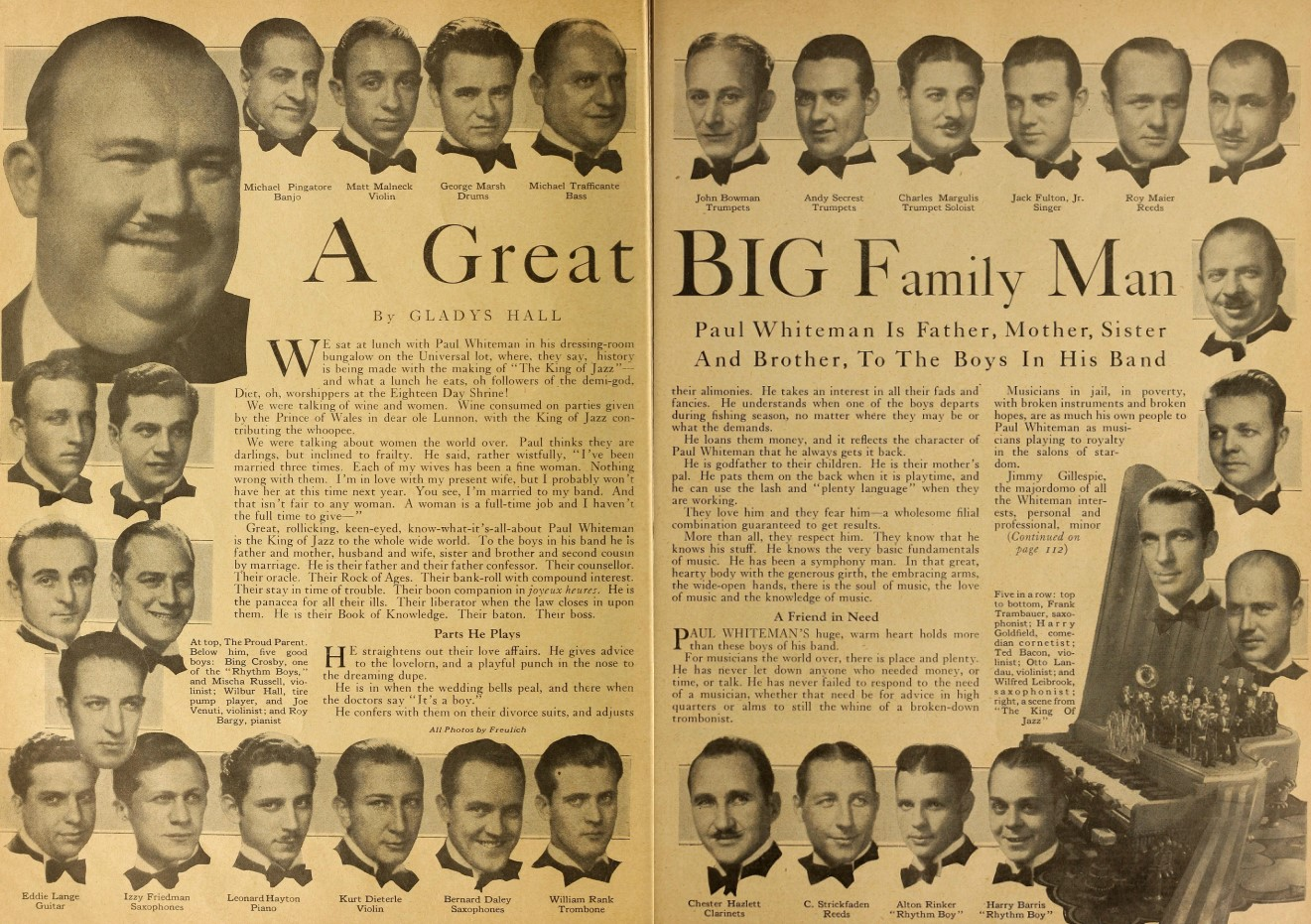
Paul Whiteman Orchestra - Motion Picture, June 1930

In 1926, he joined the Paul Whiteman orchestra. He provided the vocals for many Whiteman recordings. He was part of a trio with Charles Gaylord and Austin Young on a recording of "Makin' Whoopee." They sang with The Rhythm Boys on their 1927 recording of "Changes" and accompany Bing Crosby and Bix Beiderbecke during their solos. He appeared in King of Jazz as a part of the orchestra, briefly singing "A Bench in the Park". With the orchestra, he popularized the song "Body and Soul" in 1930. He introduced the song "How Deep Is the Ocean?" in 1932.

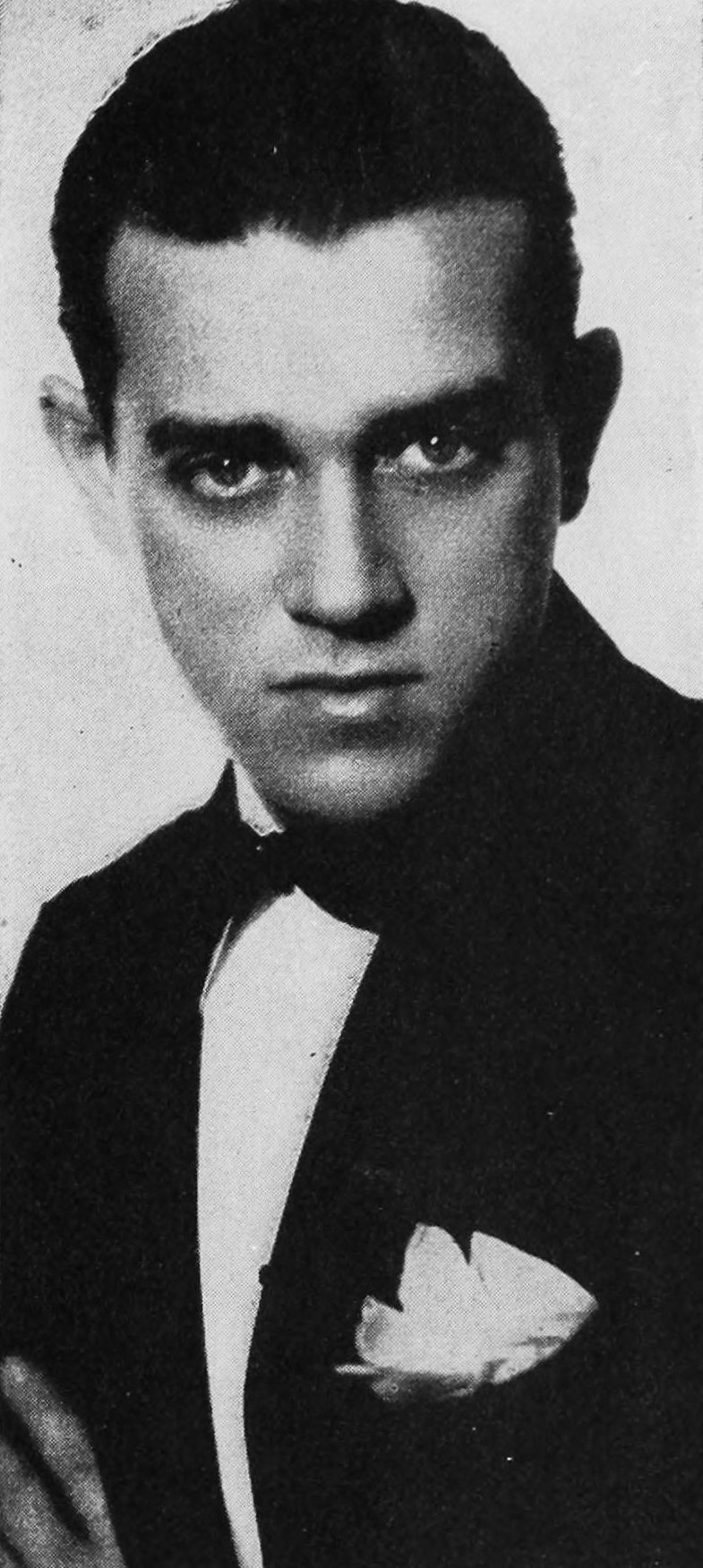
1932

He wrote around 120 compositions, including "Wanted", "Until", "If You Are But a Dream", and "My Greatest Mistake" – his first hit (1940).
