= John O'Brien (businessman) =

British businessman and advisor

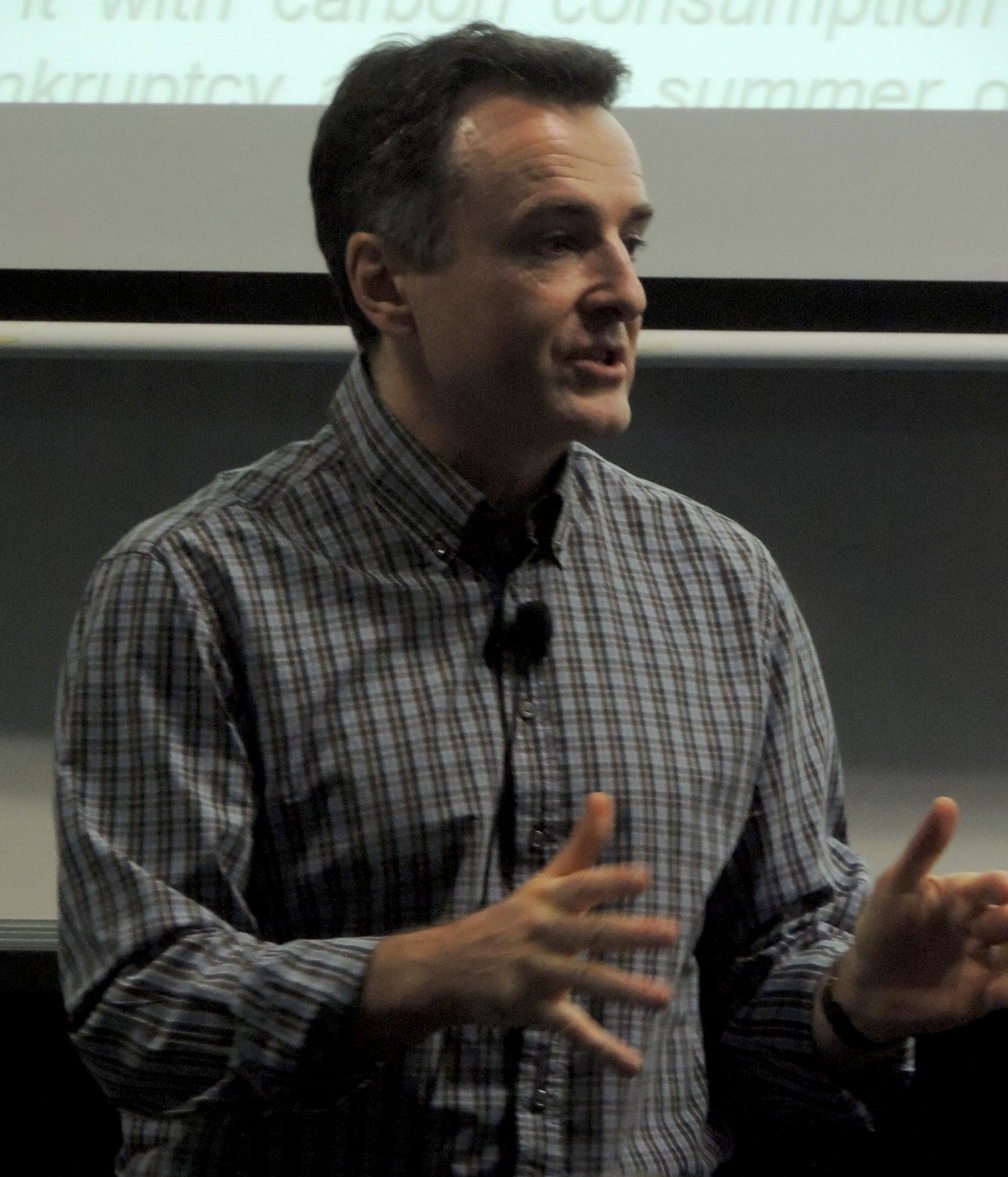
- John O'Brien speaks in Adelaide, South Australia (2015)
- Occupation: businessman
- Known for: Managing Director at Deloitte

John O'Brien is an English businessman and an expert advisor to governments, industry, financiers and the cleantech sector. Based in New York, O'Brien is a managing director in Deloitte's Climate & Sustainability practice. In this role he leads the firm's Energy Transition and Decarbonisation work.

== Education ==
O'Brien has engineering degrees from Oxford and Trinity College Dublin, plus an MBA from the University of Adelaide.

== Career ==
O'Brien previously led Deloitte's work on climate in Australia. Before that, he was the managing director of Australian CleanTech, which acted as the Australian representative for the Global CleanTech Cluster Association. He was also a non-executive director of Novarise Ltd, an ASX listed company which recycles polypropylene waste in China. O'Brien entered the Australian energy sector in the 1990s and worked for Origin Energy for nine years. He had previously worked in the Middle East, the United Kingdom and Canada, where he held various roles in the oil and gas industries and engineering consultancy. O'Brien lectured in leadership and entrepreneurship at the University of Adelaide and was a member of the Premier’s Climate Change Council in South Australia. He has been a member of the board of several CleanTech companies involved in wind farm development, biosensors and plastic recycling. He has served on the board of Renewables SA and as a member of the Clean Technology Innovation Program Committee at Innovation Australia.

== Works ==
O'Brien is the author and editor of the book Opportunities Beyond Carbon - Looking Forward to a Sustainable World, which was published in 2009 by Melbourne University Press. He has since published two further books, Visions 2100: Stories from Your Future in 2015 and Stories from 2030: Disruption-Acceleration-Transformation in 2021, on the topic of effectively communicating environmental challenges through positive storytelling. Since 2012, O'Brien has written frequently about the cleantech sector for the website, Renew Economy.
