= Jack O'Brien (footballer, born 1906) =

Australian rules footballer, born 1906

Personal information
- Full name: Nathaniel O'Brien
- Born: 9 June 1906; Yarrawonga, Victoria
- Died: 21 February 1970 (aged 63); Kew, Victoria
- Height: 185 cm (6 ft 1 in)
- Weight: 83 kg (183 lb)

Playing career^{1}
Years	Club	Games (Goals)
1928–30	South Melbourne	13 (4)
1931	Hawthorn	1 (0)
Total		14 (4)
- ^{1} Playing statistics correct to the end of 1931.

Nathaniel "Jack" O'Brien (9 June 1906 – 21 February 1970) was an Australian rules footballer who played with South Melbourne and Hawthorn in the Victorian Football League (VFL).
