= Jack Rowan (boxer) =

American boxer

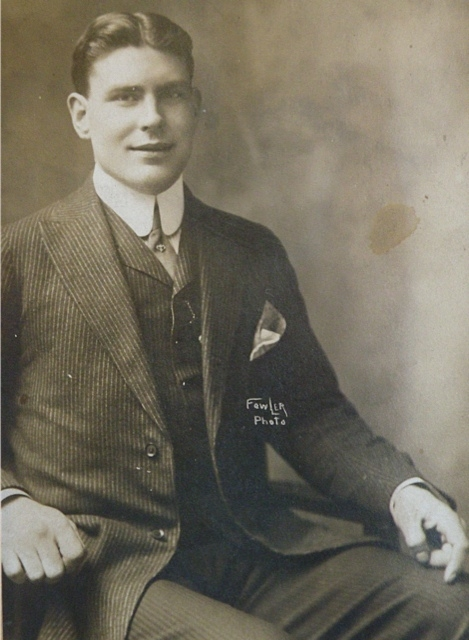

Personal information
- Nationality: American
- Born: Frank Rowan; 1887
- Died: 1959 (aged 71–72)
- Weight: Middleweight; Heavyweight

Boxing career

Boxing record
- Total fights: 37
- Wins: 19
- Win by KO: 13
- Losses: 14
- Draws: 2
- No contests: 2

Jack Rowan was the professional name of Frank Rowan (1887 – 1959), a middleweight boxer from Philadelphia, Pennsylvania, who fought during the early 20th century. He is known to have participated in 37 fights, winning 19 and losing 14.

After retiring from professional boxing, Rowan went on to manage several successful boxers. He was the cousin of Philadelphia Jack O'Brien, light heavyweight boxing champion of the world.
