= Diva Records =

American record label

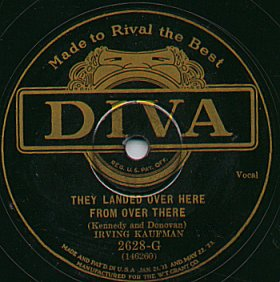
- Diva Record from 1928
- Founded: 1925
- Country of origin: United States

Diva Records was an American record label from 1925 to 1932 that sold records through W. T. Grant retail stores. It was a division of Columbia Records.

Artists on the label included Irving Kaufman, Annette Hanshaw, The Golden Gate Orchestra, Sammy Fain, "Hobo" Jack Turner, Walter Cummins, The Broadway Bellhops, Tom Clines, Ed Blossom, The Harmonians, The Royal Troubadours, The Bar Harbor Society Orchestra, Gay Ellis, Tommy Weir, Buck Wilson, Jack Albin and His Hotel Pennsylvania Music, and Vernon Dalhart.

Diva Records were acoustic through early 1929. The audio fidelity of the post-acoustic records, as well as the pressing quality is above average for the era.

== See also ==
- List of record labels
