= Sugar Lips =

Sugar Lips may refer to:

- Sugar Lips (song), a 1964 song by Al Hirt
- Sugar Lips (album), a 1964 album by Al Hirt
