= The Best of Al Hirt =

Greatest hits album by Al Hirt
- Released: 1965
- Genre: Jazz
- Length: 39:02
- Label: RCA Victor

Al Hirt chronology
Cotton Candy (1964)	The Best of Al Hirt (1965)	Live at Carnegie Hall (1965)

The Best of Al Hirt is a compilation album by Al Hirt released by RCA Victor in 1965. The album peaked at No. 13 on the Billboard Top LPs chart.

== Track listing ==
1. "Java" (Allen Toussaint, Alvin Tyler, Freddy Friday)
2. "Stranger in Paradise" (Robert Wright, George Forrest)
3. "Bourbon Street Parade"
4. "The Best Man" (featuring Ann-Margret)
5. "Stella by Starlight" (Victor Young)
6. "Holiday for Trumpet"
7. "I Love Paris" (Cole Porter)
8. "Sugar Lips" (Billy Sherrill, Buddy Killen)
9. "Poor Butterfly" (Raymond Hubbell, John Golden)
10. "Cotton Candy" (Russ Damon)
11. "Love Makes the World Go 'Round" (Theme from Carnival!) (Bob Merrill)
12. "When the Saints Go Marching In"

== Chart positions ==
Chart (1965)	Peak position
Billboard Top LPs	13
