= Gospel Train (album) =

Studio album by Sister Rosetta Tharpe
- Released: December 1956
- Recorded: 2 and 5 July 1956
- Studios: Mercury Sound, New York
- Genres: Gospel; rhythm and blues
- Length: 32:02
- Labels: Mercury; MG-20201

Gospel Train is a studio album by the gospel and R&B artist Sister Rosetta Tharpe. It was recorded in July 1956 and released in December the same year. Tharpe is accompanied on vocals on several songs by the traditional black gospel quartet the Harmonizing Four. The album was noted as part of Tharpe's induction to the Rock and Roll Hall of Fame.

== Music ==
Sister Rosetta Tharpe was already known as one of gospel's most successful and pioneering artists and a leading purveyor of the genre's blending with R&B as a precursor to rock and roll. This album finds her accompanied by musicians from the New York jazz scene. Musically, Gospel Train is rooted firmly in gospel music, specifically in the traditional black vein. Blues often appears as well.

The record marks a stylistic change in Tharpe's recording career, presaging her influence on blues and blues rock artists of the 1960s. Spectrum Culture's Will Pinfold saw this reflected on the track "Can't No Grave Hold Me Down" in 2023. With both Tharpe's "forceful" singing that "obliterate[d] the fuzzy boundary between blues and rock 'n' roll" and "nice, pithy guitar solo", he regards it a shaping a style that the Rolling Stones would continue on their 1964 debut album. In 2024, Guitar World named Train an essential record within the development of British blues. The site's Denny Ilett cites "Tharpe's soulful bluesy gospel approach" as a "key ingredient" to blues music's evolution from the 1950s through the '60s.

== Reception ==
Professional ratings
Review scores
Source	Rating
AllMusic	3.5/5 stars
Billboard	8.0/10 stars
Cross Rhythms	10/10 stars
Record Mirror	3/5 stars
Spectrum Culture	79%

A contemporary review in Billboard quotes the Methodist minister John Wesley: "'Why should the devil have all the good tunes?'"; the reviewer comments that "Sister Tharpe shows that he hasn't, and she does this with her well-known rocking rhythm and zest". The album was noted as part of Tharpe's induction to the Rock and Roll Hall of Fame.

Gospel Train is highly regarded within Tharpe's discography. The website AllMusic called it "a super collection", noting it as an album highlight of the singer's career. Author and critic Tom Moon cited the record as a choice of Tharpe's catalog in 1,000 Recordings to Hear Before You Die. Premier Guitar described the guitar work in the album as exhibiting "more technique and less raunch", concluding the record is "worth it just for the swinging, twangy and so ambient and vibey '99½ Won't Do'." In 2015, Cross Rhythms' Lins Honeyman wrote that despite being "in arguably less frantic mode than usual", she "pull[s] off some truly great performances" through her "verve and passion". The webzine Spectrum Culture characterized it as "One of Tharpe's landmark albums". Its reviewer described it as "an enjoyable, timeless album in its own right" beyond its historic legacy and praised the "skill, passion and impeccable musicianship" that it was played with.

=== Accolades ===
Critical rankings for Gospel Train
Publication	Year	List	Rank	Ref.
Tom Moon	2008	1,000 Recordings to Hear Before You Die	--	
Vulture	2013	60 Great Albums You Probably Haven't Heard	--	
Treble	2020	Soul Music: 10 Essential Albums of Faith	--	
Guitar World	2024	9 must-hear British blues guitar boom albums	--	
"--" indicates an unordered list.

== Track listing ==
All tracks composed by Rosetta Tharpe except where noted.

1. "Jericho" – 2:00 (Traditional)
2. "When they Ring the Golden Bell" – 2:27
3. "Two Little Fishes, Five Loaves of Bread" – 2:31 (Bernie Hanighen)
4. "Beams of Heaven" – 3:20
5. "Can't No Grave Hold my Body Down" – 2:40
6. "All Alone" – 2:35
7. "Up Above my Head there's Music in the Air" – 2:21
8. "I Shall Know Him" – 2:22
9. "Fly Away" – 2:25
10. "How about You" – 2:25
11. "Precious Memories" – 2:36
12. "99½ Won't Do" – 2:02

== Personnel ==
=== Musicians ===
- Sister Rosetta Tharpe – vocals, guitar
- George Duvivier – bass (tracks 1, 2, 7, 8, 9)
- Lloyd Trotman – bass (tracks 3 – 6, 10, 11, 12)
- Panama Francis – drums
- Ernest Richardson – guitar
- Harry 'Doc' Bagby – organ
- Ernie Hayes – piano
- The Harmonizing Four – vocals

== Charts ==
Chart performance for Gospel Train
Chart (2026)	Peak position
UK Jazz & Blues Albums (Official Charts)	20

== Bibliography ==
- Moore, Hilary (2005). "Sister Rosetta Tharpe". In McNeil, William K. (ed.). Encyclopedia of American Gospel Music. New York/Abingdon: Routledge. pp. 396–411. ISBN 978-1135377076.
- Wald, Gayle (March 2006). "Reviving Rosetta Tharpe: Performance and Memory in the 21st Century". Women & Performance: A Journal of Feminist Theory. 16 (1): 91–106. doi:10.1080/07407700500515944. S2CID 194074517.
