= Gospel Train =

Gospel Train can refer to:

- "The Gospel Train", a traditional African-American spiritual
- Gospel Train (album), a 1956 album by Sister Rosetta Tharpe
