= Love Makes the World Go 'Round (1961 song) =

"Love Makes the World Go 'Round" is a popular song written by Bob Merrill for the 1961 Broadway musical Carnival!. The song is also known as "Theme From Carnival".

== Background ==
Carnival!'s equivalent of "Hi-Lili, Hi-Lo", the signature song from the musical's parent film Lili, "Love Makes the World Go 'Round" is played on a concertina at the play's opening and is later sung by the characters Lili and Paul Berthalet, with the latter being concealed while his puppets apparently sing.

In scoring Carnival!, Bob Merrill had hoped to utilize French folk music as his touchstone, eschewing the conventional Tin Pan Alley style of song predominant in Broadway shows. During the development phase of Carnival!, Gower Champion and Michael Stewart – respectively set to direct the musical and write its book – would visit Merrill's apartment every morning and leave each afternoon disappointed by the lack of any evident hit song in the proposed score Merrill had played for them. When seeing out Champion and Stewart one afternoon, Merrill became irate at his visitors' attitude, telling them: "While you're waiting for this f**king elevator I can write the song I know you want" and improvising a tune reminiscent of Rodgers and Hammerstein's "Carousel Waltz". Whether or not Merrill was making a serious song pitch, Champion and Stewart's response to Merrill's impromptu composition was so positive as to demand its development into a full show tune for Carnival!, the result being "Love Makes the World Go 'Round".

== Recordings ==
- Jane Morgan released a single of "Love Makes the World Go 'Round" which served as the title cut of her August 1961 album release on the Kapp label. Jane's version did well in several major markets throughout the United States.
- The Everly Brothers recorded the song for their album Instant Party!.
- Al Hirt released a version on his 1962 album, Horn A-Plenty, and on his 1965 album The Best of Al Hirt
- Bing Crosby recorded the song for his album Bing Crosby's Treasury - The Songs I Love (1968 version).
- "Love Makes the World Go 'Round" has been recorded by Ann-Margret and Wayne Newton, among others.
