= You Took Advantage of Me =

Song
- Published: 1928
- Genre: Showtune
- Composer: Richard Rodgers
- Lyricist: Lorenz Hart

"You Took Advantage of Me" is a 1928 popular song composed by Richard Rodgers, with lyrics by Lorenz Hart, for the musical Present Arms (1928), where it was introduced by Joyce Barbour and Busby Berkeley as the characters Edna Stevens and Douglas Atwell. The characters were formerly married, but still have romantic feelings for each other. On opening night, Berkeley forgot the lyrics and had to scat and hum the entire second verse. Berkeley also claimed that his nonsense lyrics for the improvised second verse left Hart "almost apoplectic", but the audience was amused and Hart later forgave him. The song was subsequently included in the 1930 film Leathernecking, an adaptation of Present Arms.

Rodgers described the song as a "sassy and unregretful number" which audiences liked far more than traditional contemporary love songs. In his book The Poets of Tin Pan Alley, Philip Furia wrote that the song depicted a "...wittily self deprecating character who was perfectly suited to lyrics that were at once intricately rhymed yet casually conversational."

One of the earliest recordings of the song was Paul Whiteman's 1928 hit version, known especially for the performances of Bix Beiderbecke and Frankie Trumbauer. The song was a particular favorite of the Prince of Wales (the future Edward VIII). In fact, he once asked singer Morton Downey to perform the song eleven times during a show at the Café de Paris in London. The song can be sung by either gender, but has traditionally been sung by women.

== Notable recordings ==
- Irving Kaufman & Vaughn De Leath (1928)
- Paul Whiteman's Orchestra with Bing Crosby (recorded April 25, 1928)
- Miff Mole and His Little Molers (1928)
- Django Reinhardt and Stéphane Grappelli (1937)
- Snoozer Quinn (1948)
- Keely Smith (1949)
- Anita O'Day (1950)
- Judy Garland in the "Born in a Trunk" sequence from A Star Is Born (1954)
- Elaine Stritch in the revival of the show On Your Toes for which it was added in 1954 and for her solo album Stritch.
- Carmen McRae (1956) CABU Jazz Masters - Une Anthologie 1954-1956 - used as the title credits role in the movie Real Genius (1985)
- June Christy - The Misty Miss Christy (1956)
- Ella Fitzgerald - Ella Fitzgerald Sings the Rodgers & Hart Songbook (1956)
- Billie Holiday - Last Recordings (1959)
- Rosemary Clooney - Rosie Solves the Swingin' Riddle! (1960)
- Tony Bennett - My Heart Sings (1961)
- Ann-Margret -Bachelors' Paradise (1963)
- Al Hirt - That Honey Horn Sound (1965)
- Bobby Short - Bobby Short Celebrates Rodgers & Hart (1975) (Short sings both verses in this recording)
- Ella Fitzgerald and Joe Pass - Fitzgerald and Pass... Again (1976)
- Linda Ronstadt with Nelson Riddle - Lush Life (1984)
- Roseanna Vitro - Listen Here (1984)
- Lee Wiley - Hot House Rose (1996)
- The Supremes - The Supremes Sing Rodgers & Hart (2002 expanded re-release edition)
- The Hi-Lo's - A Musical Thrill (2006)
- Keith Jarrett's Standards Trio - My Foolish Heart (2007, live)
- Megan Mullally on her 2007 album Free Again!. This version was also featured on the soundtrack to Fame (2009).
