= You'll Never Know =

1943 song by Harry Warren and Mack Gordon

Song
- Published: 1943 by Bregman, Vocco and Conn
- Composer: Harry Warren
- Lyricist: Mack Gordon

"You'll Never Know", sometimes referred to as "You'll Never Know (Just How Much I Love You)" in later years, is a popular song with music written by Harry Warren and the lyrics by Mack Gordon. The song is based on a poem written by a young Oklahoma war bride named Dorothy Fern Norris.

The song was introduced in the 1943 movie Hello, Frisco, Hello where it was sung by Alice Faye. The song won the 1943 Academy Award for Best Original Song, one of nine nominated songs that year. It was also performed by Faye in the 1944 film Four Jills in a Jeep.

The song is often credited as Faye's signature song. However, Faye never released a record of the ballad, and frequent later recordings of the song by other singers diminished her association with it.

== Other recordings ==
- It was recorded in 1943 by, among others, Frank Sinatra and Dick Haymes. Sinatra recorded his version at his first recording session at Columbia as a solo artist (having recorded there in 1939 as a member of Harry James’s band.) It was arranged and conducted by Alec Wilder with the Bobby Tucker Singers providing accompaniment. Sinatra’s version charted for 16 weeks starting July 24 and spent two weeks at number 2. The Haymes version was a number one hit for four weeks on both the Billboard and Harlem Hit Parade charts. Haymes recording sold one million copies, his first gold record achievement.
- The Sinatra and Haymes records were made during the 1942–1944 musicians' strike, an American Federation of Musicians strike against the recording companies. As a result, the recordings were made without musicians, with vocal groups replacing the usual instrumental backup. The group backing Haymes, The Song Spinners, was actually given credit on the Haymes record. (The Song Spinners number one hit, "Comin' In on a Wing and a Prayer", held the top spot on the chart for three weeks preceding Haymes' "You'll Never Know." Vocalist Margaret Johnson of the Song Spinners did the vocal arrangements for both songs.)
- In Britain, the recording by Vera Lynn was very popular during the Second World War. During the film D-Day the Sixth of June the song's melody was played at various times, including when Valerie and Brad are strolling together at the seaside resort, dining in the tearoom and the Italian restaurant, and being together in her apartment.
- Rosemary Clooney recorded the song with Harry James in 1952, and Bette Midler recorded the song for the 2003 covers album Bette Midler Sings the Rosemary Clooney Songbook.
- A version was recorded in 1954 by Big Maybelle.
- The song was the first number that Barbra Streisand ever recorded, in 1955 when she was 13 years old, first released in 1991 as the opening track of her four-disc Just for the Record... box set. The same collection concludes with an orchestrated version sung as a duet by Streisand (at age 45, recorded April 21, 1988) with the voice of her younger self from that 1955 recording. Although uncredited on the CD, this closing cut was arranged and conducted by Rupert Holmes as part of the suspended Streisand-Holmes "Back to Broadway" recording sessions. Barbra then dramatized the 1955 recording session as part of the opening of her Timeless concert tour in 2000. A recording of this was featured on the accompanying CD & DVD release: Timeless: Live in Concert.
- Bing Crosby recorded it for his radio show in 1957 and it was subsequently issued on CD.
- Doris Day recorded a version in her two-album set Hooray for Hollywood in 1958.
- Shirley Bassey reached #6 on the UK charts with her 1961 version.
- Bobby Darin recorded a version for his 1962 album, Oh! Look at Me Now.
- Eartha Kitt recorded a version for her 1962 album, The Romantic Eartha.
- The Platters recorded the song in 1962 for their album, Song For the Lonely. It reached No. 109 on the US Billboard chart. It is often confused with a song with a similar title, "You'll Never, Never Know," charting at #11 in August 1956.
- Al Hirt released a version on his 1965 album, They're Playing Our Song.
- Trini Lopez included "You'll Never Know" on his 1965 Reprise Records album The Sing Along World of Trini Lopez.
- The Mamas & the Papas vocalist Denny Doherty included the song on his 1974 solo album Waiting for a Song. The single was released with "Goodnight and Good Morning", from the same album, as the B-side. This version reached the top 15 of Billboard's Easy Listening survey.
- Singer and actress Bernadette Peters sang the song on her eponymous debut solo album in 1980.
- Singer Antonio Marcos released a Spanish rendition of the theme, named "Nunca Sabrás", in the Spanish soundtrack from the Brazilian Soap Opera "Baila Conmigo" (Dance With Me), created by Manoel Carlos and televised by Rede Globo in 1981.
- Elkie Brooks recorded it for her 1984 album, Screen Gems.

== Other pop culture appearances ==
- Ginger Rogers performed the song in the 1952 American comedy film Dreamboat.
- Martin Scorsese's 1974 film Alice Doesn't Live Here Anymore used Alice Faye's 1943 film recording as its opening song.
- Barbara Mandrell performed the song in her final curtain call for her retirement concert, "The Last Dance" in 1997.
- On Family Guy, Lois sings the song in Peter's basement bar in the episode Mind Over Murder 1999.
- As Carlton Cinema ceased operations on 31 March 2003, this song was played during its farewell montage. The end of the song was interrupted by an announcer saying, “Carlton Cinema thanks all our viewers for tuning in over the last four years. We hope you enjoyed watching the films as much as we've enjoyed bringing them to you.” The montage ended with the Carlton Cinema logo, above it, its launch date (15 November 1998) and its closure date (31 March 2003) over a Golden Age of Hollywood curtain. It then faded to black and the channel was officially closed. Its transmitters were still on until midnight, though.
- In 2017, Renée Fleming and the London Symphony Orchestra recorded a version of "You'll Never Know" for use in Guillermo del Toro's 2017 film The Shape of Water. Alice Faye's 1943 film recording is also used in the film, and Renée Fleming's version is lip-synched later by Sally Hawkins as part of a dance number with Doug Jones.
