= Fancy pants =

Fancy pants may refer to:

- Fancypants, a 2011 comedy/drama film
- Fancy Pants (film), a 1950 comedy film
- "Fancy Pants" (The Angry Beavers), an episode of The Angry Beavers
- Fancy Pants (video game series), a video game series by Brad Borne
- Fancy Pants (album), a 1983 album by Count Basie
- "Fancy Pants" (Al Hirt song), 1965
- "Mr. Fancy Pants", a song by Jonathan Coulton from the album Thing a Week Four
- "Hey There Fancypants", a song by Ween from Quebec
- "Fancypants Manifesto", a song by Lemon Demon from Hip To The Java Bean
- Lyle Beerbohm (born 1979), mixed martial arts fighter nicknamed "Fancy Pants"
