= Memories of You =

1930 popular song

Song
- Published: 1930
- Genre: pop song, jazz standard
- Composer: Eubie Blake
- Lyricist: Andy Razaf

"Memories of You" is a popular song about nostalgia with lyrics written by Andy Razaf and music composed by Eubie Blake and published in 1930.

== Song history ==
The song was introduced by singer Minto Cato in the Broadway show Lew Leslie's Blackbirds of 1930. A 1930 version recorded by Louis Armstrong featuring Lionel Hampton is the first known use of the vibraphone in popular music.

The Armstrong recording in 1930 was reviewed by Times magazine's monthly record review alongside opera records and Western art music records of composers such as Bach, Beethoven, Schumann, and Ravel.

A version of the song recorded by The Four Coins from the biopic The Benny Goodman Story reached #22 on the Billboard magazine chart in 1955.

Doc Severinsen and the NBC Orchestra performed an instrumental version on the final episode of The Tonight Show Starring Johnny Carson, on May 22, 1992. The song played over a five-minute montage showing brief silent clips of some of Carson's favorite guests, seen interacting with him through the years. This was also the final song on the final album Frank Sinatra recorded for Capitol Records, Point of No Return, from 1962.

Between 1970 and 2019 the song was used as the theme song for the popular NRK radio program Nitimen. That version was an uptempo version by Werner Müller (musician) and his orchestra from 1964.

== Other recordings ==
- Louis Armstrong – 1930 with his Sebastian New Cotton Club Orchestra
- Garland Wilson – solo piano recording February 2, 1932. (OKeh 41556)
- Casa Loma Orchestra – 1937
- Benny Goodman with Lionel Hampton and Charlie Christian – 1939
- Art Tatum – The Art Tatum Solo Masterpieces, Vol. 5 – 1953
- The Four Coins – (Single:Orchestra Under the Direction of Don Costa) – (1955)
- Benny Goodman with Rosemary Clooney – Date with the King (1955)
- Judy Garland – Judy (1956)
- Thelonious Monk – The Unique (1956) and It's Monk's Time (1964)
- Charles Mingus – East Coasting (1957)
- Frank Sinatra – Point of No Return (1961)
- Al Hirt – Horn A-Plenty (1962)
- Ella Fitzgerald – "Hello Dolly" with Frank Devol (1964)
- Jaki Byard with Roland Kirk – The Jaki Byard Experience (1968)
- Werner Muller and his orchestra – Golden Evergreens (1969)
- Eubie Blake – Jazz Piano Masters (1972)
- Billy Eckstine Sings with Benny Carter (1986)
- Tom Varner – The Window Up Above, American Songs 1770–1998 (1998)
- Jessica Williams – More for Monk (2002)
- Kenny Barron – The Traveler (2008)
- Fred Hersch – Alone at the Vanguard (2010)
- Ellery Eskelin – Trio New York (2011)
- Dr. John – Ske-Dat-De-Dat: The Spirit of Satch (2014)

== See also ==
- List of 1930s jazz standards
