= Live at Carnegie Hall (Al Hirt album) =

Live album by Al Hirt
- Released: 1965
- Venue: Carnegie Hall, New York City
- Genre: Jazz
- Label: RCA Victor
- Producer: Jim Foglesong

Al Hirt chronology
The Best of Al Hirt (1965)	Live at Carnegie Hall (1965)	That Honey Horn Sound (1965)

Professional ratings
Review scores
Source	Rating
Allmusic	2/5 stars

Live at Carnegie Hall is a 1965 live album by Al Hirt released by RCA Victor recorded at Carnegie Hall. The album was produced by Jim Foglesong arranged by Gerald Wilson.

The album reached No. 47 on the Billboard Top LPs chart.

== Track listing ==
1. "Bye Bye Blues" (Fred Hamm, Dave Bennett, Bert Lown)
2. "Gypsy in My Soul" (Clay Boland, Moe Jaffe)
3. "Opening Speech"
4. "Walk Right In" (Gus Cannon, Hosea Woods)
5. "Limelight" (Gerald Wilson)
6. "Down by the Riverside"
7. "Love for Sale" (Cole Porter)
8. "Up Above My Head (I Hear Music in the Air)" (Sister Rosetta Tharpe)
9. "When I'm Feelin' Kinda Blue" (Villa Senor)
10. "Going To Chicago Blues" (Count Basie, James Rushing)
11. "Carnival of Venice"
12. "Tennessee Waltz" (Redd Stewart, Pee Wee King)
13. "Kansas City" (Richard Rodgers, Oscar Hammerstein II)
14. "Java" (Allen Toussaint, Alvin Tyler, Freddy Friday)

== Chart positions ==
Chart (1965)	Peak position
Billboard Top LPs	47
