= Trumpet and Strings =

Studio album by Al Hirt
- Released: 1962
- Genre: Jazz
- Length: 32:30
- Label: RCA Victor

Al Hirt chronology
Horn A-Plenty (1962)	Trumpet and Strings (1962)	Honey in the Horn (1963)

Professional ratings
Review scores
Source	Rating
Allmusic	2/5 stars

Trumpet and Strings is an album by Al Hirt released on RCA Victor. The album was arranged by Marty Paich.

The album landed on the Billboard 200 chart in 1962, reaching #96.

== Track listing ==
1. "Stranger in Paradise" (Robert Wright, George Forrest)
2. "Poor Butterfly" (Raymond Hubbell, John Golden)
3. "Fools Rush In" (Johnny Mercer, Rube Bloom)
4. "Sleepy Lagoon" (Eric Coates, Jack Lawrence)
5. "As Time Goes By" (Herman Hupfeld)
6. "East of the Sun" (Brooks Bowman)
7. "Sleepless Hours" (Albert VanDam)
8. "True Love" (Cole Porter)
9. "I'll Never Smile Again" (Ruth Lowe)
10. "I Cried for You" (Gus Arnheim, Arthur Freed, Abe Lyman)
11. "How Deep Is the Ocean?" (Irving Berlin)
12. "Easy to Love" (Cole Porter)

== Chart positions ==
Chart (1962)	Peak position
Billboard Top LPs	96
