= That Honey Horn Sound =

Studio album by Al Hirt
- Released: 1965
- Genre: Jazz
- Label: RCA Victor
- Producer: Chet Atkins

Al Hirt chronology
Live at Carnegie Hall (1965)	That Honey Horn Sound (1965)	They're Playing Our Song (1965)

Professional ratings
Review scores
Source	Rating
Allmusic	3/5 stars
The Penguin Guide to Jazz Recordings	2.5/4 stars

That Honey Horn Sound is an album by Al Hirt released by RCA Victor in 1965. The album was produced by Chet Atkins and arranged by Anita Kerr and Claus Ogerman.

The single "Fancy Pants" hit #9 on the Adult Contemporary chart and #47 on the Billboard Hot 100 in 1965. The album landed on the Billboard Top LPs chart, reaching #28.

== Track listing ==
1. "Fancy Pants" (Floyd Cramer)
2. "Danny Boy" (Frederic Weatherly)
3. "Long Walk Home" (Chip Taylor)
4. "The Contrary Waltz" (Tupper Saussy)
5. "Fiddler on the Roof" (Jerry Bock, Sheldon Harnick)
6. "None But the Lonely Heart" (Pyotr Ilyich Tchaikovsky)
7. "Alley Cat" (Bent Fabric)
8. "Star Dust" (Hoagy Carmichael, Mitchell Parish)
9. "Butterball" (Frank Catana, Russ Damon)
10. "Over the Rainbow" (E. Y. Harburg, Harold Arlen)
11. "You Took Advantage of Me" (Richard Rodgers, Lorenz Hart)
12. "Flowers and Candy" (Beasley Smith, Teddy Bart)

== Chart positions ==
Album

Year	Chart	Peak Position
1965	Billboard Top LPs	28

Singles

Year	Single	Chart	Peak Position
1965	"Fancy Pants"	Easy Listening	47
1964	"Fancy Pants"	Billboard Hot 100	9
