= You'll Sing a Song and I'll Sing a Song =

You’ll Sing a Song and I’ll Sing a Song

Studio album by Ella Jenkins
- Released: 1966
- Genre: Folk music
- Length: 32:55
- Label: Folkways

Professional ratings
Review scores
Source	Rating
AllMusic	5/5 stars

You'll Sing a Song and I'll Sing a Song is an album by folk singer Ella Jenkins. She is joined by members of the Urban Gateways Children's Chorus. It was added to the National Recording Registry by the Library of Congress in 2007.

== Track listing ==
1. "You'll Sing a Song and I'll Sing a Song" (Ella Jenkins) – 4:20
2. "Shabot Shalom" (Traditional) – :46
3. "Cadima" (Traditional) – 1:37
4. "This Train" (Traditional) – 3:02
5. "Did You Feed My Cow?" (Traditional) – 3:12
6. "Miss Mary Mack" (Traditional) – 1:56
7. "May-Ree Mack" (Jenkins, Traditional) – 2:11
8. "You'll Sing a Song and I'll Sing a Song (Review)" – 2:41
9. "Dulce, Dulce" (Jenkins) – 1:16
10. "May-Ree Mack (Review)" – 2:18
11. "Maori Indian Battle Chant" :31
12. "Did You Feed My Cow? (Review)" – 2:33
13. "I Saw" (Jenkins) – 2:20
14. "Sifting in the Sand" (Traditional) – 1:10
15. "Guide Me" (Traditional) – 3:02

== Personnel ==
- Ella Jenkins – vocals, harmonica, ukulele, guitar
- Urban Gateways Children's Chorus – choir
