= Cotton Candy (album) =

Studio album by Al Hirt
- Released: 1964
- Studio: RCA Victor (Nashville)
- Genre: Jazz
- Length: 59:45
- Label: RCA Victor
- Producer: Chet Atkins

Al Hirt chronology
Sugar Lips (1964)	Cotton Candy (1964)	The Best of Al Hirt (1965)

Professional ratings
Review scores
Source	Rating
Allmusic	3/5 stars
The Penguin Guide to Jazz Recordings	3/4 stars

Cotton Candy is an album by Al Hirt that was released in 1964 by RCA Victor. The album features the Anita Kerr Singers.

The title track hit No. 3 on the Easy Listening chart and No. 15 on the Billboard Hot 100. "Walkin'" was released as the B-Side to "Cotton Candy" and reached No. 103 on the Billboard 100. The album landed on the Billboard 200 chart in 1964, reaching #6.

== Track listing ==
1. "Cotton Candy" (Russ Damon)
2. "Hello, Dolly!" (Jerry Herman)
3. "Django's Castle" (Django Reinhardt)
4. "Moo Moo" (Allen Toussaint)
5. "Last Date" (Floyd Cramer)
6. "Big Man" (Beasley Smith)
7. "Walkin'" (Jerry Reed)
8. "Too Late (Trop Tard)" (Charles Aznavour)
9. "Rumpus" (Shurelon J. Jones)
10. "Melissa" (Tupper Saussy)
11. "Walkin' with Mr. Lee" (Lee Allen)
12. "12th Street Rag" (Euday L. Bowman)

== Personnel ==
- Al Hirt - trumpet
- Al Hirt and His Orchestra - orchestra
- Al Hirt and His Chorus - chorus
- Bob Moore, Boots Randolph, Buddy Harman, Dutch McMillin, Floyd Cramer, Grady Martin, Ray Edenton, The Anita Kerr Singers - musicians

Technical

- Chuck Seitz - recording engineer

== Chart positions ==
Chart (1964)	Peak position
Billboard Top LPs	6

Singles

Year	Single	Chart	Peak position
1964	"Cotton Candy"	Easy Listening (Billboard)	3
1964	"Cotton Candy"	Billboard Hot 100	15
