= He's the King and His Band =

Studio album by Al Hirt
- Released: 1961
- Genre: Jazz
- Label: RCA Victor
- Producer: Steve Sholes

Al Hirt chronology
Swingin' Dixie at Dan's Pier 600 in New Orleans, Vol. 2 (1959)	He's the King and His Band (1961)	The Greatest Horn in the World (1961)

Professional ratings
Review scores
Source	Rating
Allmusic	3/5 stars

He's the King and His Band is the first album by Al Hirt to be released by RCA Victor. The album was recorded at RCA Victor's Studio A in New York City.

The album reached No. 61 on the Billboard Top LPs chart in 1961.

== Track listing ==
1. "I Love Paris" (Cole Porter)
2. "One O'Clock Jump" (Count Basie)
3. "The Jitterbug Waltz" (Fats Waller)
4. "Jazz Me Blues" (Tom Delaney)
5. "The King's Blues" (Gerard Purcell)
6. "Cornet Chow Suey" (Louis Armstrong)
7. "The Old Folks At Home" (Stephen Foster)
8. "Lover Come Back To Me" (Sigmund Romberg, Oscar Hammerstein II)
9. "Christopher Columbus" (Leon Berry, Andy Razaf)
10. "Laura" (David Raksin, Johnny Mercer)
11. "Down by the Riverside" (Traditional)
12. "Three Little Words" (Harry Ruby, Bert Kalmar)

== Chart positions ==
Chart (1961)	Peak position
Billboard Top LPs	61
