= Sugar Lips (album) =

Studio album by Al Hirt
- Released: 1964
- Studios: RCA Victor, Nashville
- Genre: Jazz
- Length: 28:05
- Label: RCA Victor
- Producer: Chet Atkins

Al Hirt chronology
Beauty and the Beard (1964)	Sugar Lips (1964)	Cotton Candy (1964)

Professional ratings
Review scores
Source	Rating
AllMusic	4.5/5 stars

Sugar Lips is an album by Al Hirt released in 1964 by RCA Victor.

The single, "Sugar Lips", reached No. 3 on the Easy Listening chart and No. 30 on the Billboard Hot 100 in 1964. The single, "Up Above My Head (I Hear Music in the Air)", hit No. 85 on the Billboard Hot 100. The album peaked at No. 9 on the Billboard Top LPs chart.

== Reception ==
Cashbox in its "Pop Picks" reviews stated that "Al Hirt tags this new Victor album outing after his current single biggie, 'Sugar Lips,' and includes eleven other easy-going and up-tempo popular newies and sturdies." They added, "While backed by his ork and chorus, the vet trumpeter swings up a storm on 'The Girl From Ipanema,' 'Back Home In Indiana' and 'September Song,'" concluding that the "LP should develop into a sales-monster."

== Track listing ==
1. "Sugar Lips" (Billy Sherrill, Buddy Killen)
2. "The Girl from Ipanema" (Antônio Carlos Jobim, Vinicius de Moraes, Norman Gimbel)
3. "Tenderly" (Walter Gross, Jack Lawrence)
4. "Up Above My Head (I Hear Music in the Air)" (Sister Rosetta Tharpe)
5. "Milano" (Cy Coleman)
6. "Back Home Again in Indiana" (Ballard MacDonald, James F. Hanley)
7. "Pink Confetti" (Jerry Kennedy)
8. "Poupee Brisee (Broken Doll)" (Eddie Vartan, Georges Aber)
9. "September Song" (Kurt Weill, Maxwell Anderson)
10. "New Orleans, My Home Town" (Beasley Smith, Teddy Bart)
11. "Night Life" (Willie Nelson)
12. "Looking For The Blues" (Billy Towne, Ritchie Adams)

== Personnel ==
- Al Hart - trumpet
- Jerry R. Hubbard - guitar
- Floyd Cramer - piano
- Hargus Robbins - organ
- The Anita Kerr Singers - chorus, arranged by Anita Kerr
- Bob Moore, Boots Randolph, Buddy Harman, Dutch McMillin, Grady Martin, Ray Edenton - unspecified instruments

Technical

- Chuck Seitz - recording engineer

== Chart positions ==
Chart (1964)	Peak position
US Billboard Top LPs	9

Singles

Year	Single	Chart	Peak position
1964	"Sugar Lips"	Easy Listening (Billboard)	3
1964	"Sugar Lips"	Billboard Hot 100	30
1964	"Up Above My Head (I Hear Music in the Air)"	Billboard Hot 100	85
