= Java (instrumental) =

Single by Al Hirt

from the album Honey in the Horn
- B-side: "I Can't Get Started"
- Released: November 1963
- Recorded: 1963
- Studio: RCA Studio B, Nashville
- Genre: Jazz
- Length: 1:55
- Label: RCA Victor
- Songwriters: Allen Toussaint, Alvin Tyler, Freddy Friday
- Producers: Chet Atkins, Steve Sholes

Al Hirt singles chronology
"Java" (1963)	"Cotton Candy" (1964)

"Java" is an instrumental adaptation from a 1958 LP of piano compositions, The Wild Sounds of New Orleans, by Tousan, also known as New Orleans producer/songwriter Allen Toussaint. As was the case of the rest of Toussaint's LP, "Java" was composed in studio, primarily by Toussaint.

The first charting version, although it fell just short of the U.S. Top 40, was done by Floyd Cramer in 1962.

In 1963, trumpet player Al Hirt recorded the instrumental, and the track was the first single from his album Honey in the Horn. It was Hirt's first and biggest hit on the US pop charts, reaching #4 on the Billboard Hot 100 on February 29, 1964 and spending four weeks at #1 on the easy listening chart in early 1964. The song was also featured on his greatest hits album, The Best of Al Hirt. Hirt released a live version on his 1965 album, Live at Carnegie Hall. He also recorded "Java" with Arthur Fiedler and the Boston Pops for the RCA Red Seal album Pops Goes the Trumpet (Holiday for Brass) in 1964.

Hirt's recording won the Grammy Award for Best Performance by an Orchestra or Instrumentalist with Orchestra in 1964.

== Chart history ==
=== Year-end charts ===
Floyd Cramer

Chart (1962–63)	Peak position
U.S. Billboard Hot 100	49
U.S. Billboard Adult Contemporary	12
U.S. Cash Box Top 100	44

Al Hirt

Chart (1964)	Peak position
New Zealand (Listener)	7
U.S. Billboard Hot 100	4
U.S. Billboard Adult Contemporary	1
U.S. Cash Box Top 100	4

Chart (1964)	Rank
U.S. Billboard Hot 100	12
U.S. Cash Box	16

== Later uses ==
"Java" was used as the closing theme for Vision On, a British children's television programme, shown on BBC1 from 1964 to 1976, with Hirt's version featured until the early '70s, and Bert Kaempfert's rendering used thereafter.

The Soviet gymnast Olga Korbut performed her gold medal-winning floor routine at the 1972 Summer Olympics in Munich to a live piano version condensed to about 1 minute 9 seconds.

Henson Alternative and The Muppet Show featured "Java" at the beginning of episode 22, as accompaniment for a dance by two tube-like creatures. The bigger creature constantly stomped the smaller one flat and pushed it away, only for the smaller one to blast it off the stage as the piece ended. The Muppets performed "Java" on Al Hirt's Fanfare on July 31, 1965, and twice on The Ed Sullivan Show on November 27, 1966, and May 26, 1968.

An arrangement of "Java" was used in the Commodore 64 game Jumpin' Jack in 1983.

== Cover versions ==
Hugo Winterhalter covered it on his Best of '64 album in 1964.

The Angels, in 1965 as the B-side to the song "Little Beatle Boy".

Bobby Hackett, on the 1965 album Trumpet's Greatest Hits.

The Beautiful South, in 1994, releasing it as a B-side to "One Last Love Song". Despite being a band with three vocalists, this was an instrumental version. They also performed the track live, often ending gigs with it, with the vocalists playing handheld percussion instruments or bouncing round the stage on giant space hoppers.

== See also ==
- List of number-one adult contemporary singles of 1964 (U.S.)
