= The Greatest Horn in the World =

Studio album by Al Hirt
- Released: 1961
- Genre: Jazz
- Label: RCA Victor
- Producer: Steve Sholes

Al Hirt chronology
| He's the King and His Band (1961) | The Greatest Horn in the World (1961) | At the Mardi Gras (1962) |

The Greatest Horn in the World is the second album by Al Hirt to be released by RCA Victor. Like his previous album, Hirt covers some of the most famous jazz standards of his time.

The album landed on the Billboard 200 chart in 1961, reaching #21.

== Track listing ==
1. "Stompin' at the Savoy" (Edgar Sampson)
2. "Begin the Beguine" (Cole Porter)
3. "Let's Do It" (Cole Porter)
4. "Sweet Sue, Just You" (Victor Young, Will J. Harris)
5. "Undecided" (Sid Robin, Charlie Shavers)
6. "I'm on My Way" (Traditional)
7. "Out of Nowhere" (Johnny Green, Edward Heyman)
8. "Georgia on My Mind" (Hoagy Carmichael, Stuart Gorrell)
9. "Stella by Starlight" (Victor Young)
10. "Willow Weep for Me" (Ann Ronell)
11. "What's New" (Bob Haggart, Johnny Burke)
12. "To Ava"

== Chart positions ==
| Chart (1961) | Peak position |
|---|---|
| Billboard Top LPs | 21 |
