= Carnival! =

1961 Broadway musical

Carnival
- Original Broadway Cast Album
- Music: Bob Merrill
- Lyrics: Bob Merrill
- Book: Michael Stewart
- Basis: The film Lili (1953)
- Productions: 1961 Broadway; 1961 First US National Tour; 1962 Second US National Tour; 1962 Sydney; 1963 West End; 2002 Encores! 2007 Kennedy Center

Carnival is a musical, originally produced by David Merrick on Broadway in 1961, with the book by Michael Stewart and music and lyrics by Bob Merrill. The musical is based on the 1953 film Lili, which again was based on the short story and treatment titled "The Seven Souls of Clement O'Reilly" by Paul Gallico. The show's title originally used an exclamation point (as Carnival!); it was eventually dropped during the show's run, as director Gower Champion felt it gave the wrong impression, saying, "It's not a blockbuster. It's a gentle show."

== Background ==
In December 1958 producer David Merrick announced his intent to produce a stage musical based on the 1953 film Lili, a concept suggested to Merrick by that film's screenwriter Helen Deutsch. Originally Deutsch was to write the musical's book while the score was assigned to Gérard Calvi, a French composer—Lili was set in France—who authored the revue La Plume de Ma Tante which Merrick produced on Broadway. Calvi's lack of expertise with English lyrics would result in his dropping out of the Lili musical; on Deutsch's recommendation Merrick hired Bob Merrill to write the score.

After seeing the musical Bye Bye Birdie which opened on Broadway in April 1960, Merrick recruited the production's stage director/choreographer Gower Champion to act in those capacities for the Lili musical. Helen Deutsch would soon be dropped from Merrick's project, as Merrick was finding the drafts she was submitting unworkable for the stage. Feeling he could get the desired result more expediently working with a writer with stage musical experience, Merrick recruited Bye Bye Birdie writer Michael Stewart in September 1960, the invitation being made through Gower Champion. (In its final form Carnival would credit its book to "Michael Stewart based on material by Helen Deutsch".) A month after Stewart submitted his first draft for Carnival!—as the Lili musical project was entitled by November 1960—the writer was fired by Merrick; however he was rehired thirty-six hours later. Magician Roy Benson was the magical adviser teaching Marco the magic used in the show.

== Synopsis ==
=== Act 1 ===
A lone figure, Jacquot, is playing "Love Makes the World Go 'Round" on a concertina as the carnival is being set up ("Opening"). Gradually, the other carnival members arrive and parade their colorful banners and bright costumes ("Direct From Vienna"). Lili, an optimistic orphan, enters the carnival, in hopes of a job ("A Very Nice Man"). But instead, Grobert, the souvenir salesman, tries to sexually assault her. Marco the Magnificent, a handsome magician, enters as Lili escapes from Grobert, and performs a magic trick, which enchants Lili so much that she falls in love with him.

In another part of the carnival Paul Berthalet, a lonely and bitter puppeteer who has become crippled because of his war wounds, is preparing his new act, which is lifeless and uninteresting. The carnival manager B. F. Schlegel, fires him. Jacquot, who is his assistant puppeteer, tells Paul he can smooth things over; but Paul, unhappy with his new life as a cripple, declares his need to find a meaning for his life ("I've Got to Find a Reason"). Lili happens by at that moment, and Paul dismisses her. Lili tells Paul and a charmed Jacquot that she cannot leave because she has come from a long way from "Mira" and longs to live a grand life. At that moment, Marco returns from the parade and a jealous Paul tells him to leave her alone because "she's not like the others." Marco invites her to his trailer and charms her ("A Sword and a Rose and a Cape"). His longtime mistress and aging assistant Rosalie learns that Marco has a female friend over and worries that Marco is trying to have an affair behind her back ("Humming").

Marco offers Lili a job in his magic show and an excited Lili takes the role ("Yes, My Heart"). Meanwhile, Jacquot convinces Paul to stay with the carnival because no matter where he goes, he will never again be the famous dancer that he once was. Paul ponders on how miserable he has been since becoming crippled, comparing himself to the smiling puppets ("Everyone Likes You"). At the magic show, unable to keep her enthusiasm under control, Lili ruins one of Marco's magic tricks during his show and gets herself fired ("Magic, Magic"). Despite the mishap, the rest of the carnival goes on without a hitch ("Tanz Mit Mir"/"Carnival Ballet").

Humiliated, she starts to attempt a suicidal jump from the acrobat's ladder, but is stopped by a small redheaded puppet named Carrot Top. Lili meets the three other puppets: Horrible Henry, Marguerite, and Reynardo the Fox. After singing a song to comfort Horrible Henry ("Love Makes the World Go 'Round"), Lili is invited to join the puppet act. When she leaves with Jacquot to find a place to stay in the carnival, Marco taunts Paul through Carrot Top, "Poor old Carrot Top...she loves ME!"

=== Act 2 ===
The puppet act becomes a hit as Lili becomes close with the puppets, not realizing what they really are ("Yum Ticky"/"The Rich"/"Love Makes the World Go 'Round" [Reprise]/"Beautiful Candy"). Paul notices that he pays a lot of attention to Lili and curses his obsession with "Her Face", only to realize the emotion he is feeling is love. All the same, he treats her with increasing cruelty, but increasing care through his four alter egos. Jacquot sees that the carnival is gaining popularity and predicts that the carnival will soon be "The Grand Imperial Cirque De Paris." In the morning, Paul watches Marco and Lili almost kiss and stops them. Jealous, Paul is verbally abusive to her while practicing with Lili, correcting her every move and executes a dance step miserably, causing him to fall. He causes Lili to have a breakdown and he kisses her. Lili, shocked, angry and confused about his feelings, decides to leave the carnival as Paul mourns that she will never know his true feelings. Lili still has not put together that the puppets she loves so much and who are nice to her, are in fact the hated Paul ("I Hate Him"/"Her Face" Reprise).

The next day, the circus travels to a new town ("The Grand Imperial Cirque De Paris"/"Direct from Vienna" Reprises). Behind the scenes, Marco practices a magic trick with Rosalie, who has threatened to leave him for a doctor. They pledge their love to each other, deciding to run away together to start their own show ("Always, Always You"). But, Marco tells Lili that he is leaving the carnival and secretly invites her. Even though she has learned of his womanizing ways from Rosalie, a frantic Lili accepts. Paul objects to this and Marco taunts him, ending with Paul attacking him. Upon seeing this, Lili screams her hatred and Paul strikes her. As Paul realizes "She's My Love", an angry Jacquot tells him that he made Lili grow up, teaching her the world is full of cruelty and not of love.

As Lili is leaving, she says goodbye to Marco, telling him that she was living a little girl's dream and she must move forward with her life. Marco tries to take her back, but he is impressed with her newfound maturity and lets her go. Carrot Top and Horrible Henry appear to Lili, telling her to take them with her. She sees the puppets are trembling, and lifts the puppets off to discover that the puppets have been Paul all along. (In some revised versions, Lili reveals that she always knew that the puppets were Paul.) As Paul angrily confesses his love for her, she begins to understand the kindness in him and together, they follow the carnival.

=== Other characters ===
- B.F. Schlegel: The grumpy ringmaster of "Cirque de Paris"
- Grobert: The sleazy souvenir peddler
- Princess Olga: A seductive snake-charming mistress
- Gladys Zuwicki: Gloria's sassy, loud-mouth partner in the Siamese twin act
- Gloria Zuwicki: Gladys' soft-spoken partner in the Siamese twin act
- Dr. Glass: Rosalie's wealthy veterinarian boyfriend
- Greta Schlegel: B.F. Schlegel's spoiled, pampered daughter

== Songs ==
Act I

- "Direct from Vienna" – The Incomparable Rosalie, Greta Schlegel and Carnival People
- "A Very Nice Man" – Lili
- "Fairyland" – Puppets
- "I've Got to Find a Reason" – Paul Berthalet
- "Mira" – Lili
- "Sword, Rose and Cape" – Marco the Magnificent and Roustabouts
- "Humming" – The Incomparable Rosalie and Mr. Schlegel
- "Yes, My Heart" – Lili and Roustabouts
- "Everybody Likes You" – Paul Berthalet
- "Magic, Magic" – Marco the Magnificent, The Incomparable Rosalie and Lili
- "Tanz Mit Mir" – The Bluebird Girls
- "Carnival Ballet" – Lili, Carnival People and Townspeople
- "Mira" (Reprise) – Lili
- "Love Makes the World Go 'Round" – Lili and Puppets

Act II

- "Yum Ticky" – Lili and Puppets
- "The Rich" – Lili and Puppets
- "Love Makes the World Go 'Round" (Reprise) – Lili and Puppets
- "Beautiful Candy" – Lili, Puppets and Vendors
- "Her Face" – Paul Berthalet
- "Grand Imperial Cirque de Paris" – Jacquot and Carnival People
- "I Hate Him"/"Her Face" (Reprise) – Lili and Paul
- "Grand Imperial Cirque de Paris"/"Direct from Vienna" (Reprises) – Carnival People
- "Always Always You" – Marco the Magnificent and The Incomparable Rosalie
- "She's My Love" – Paul Berthalet

== Productions ==
=== Broadway ===
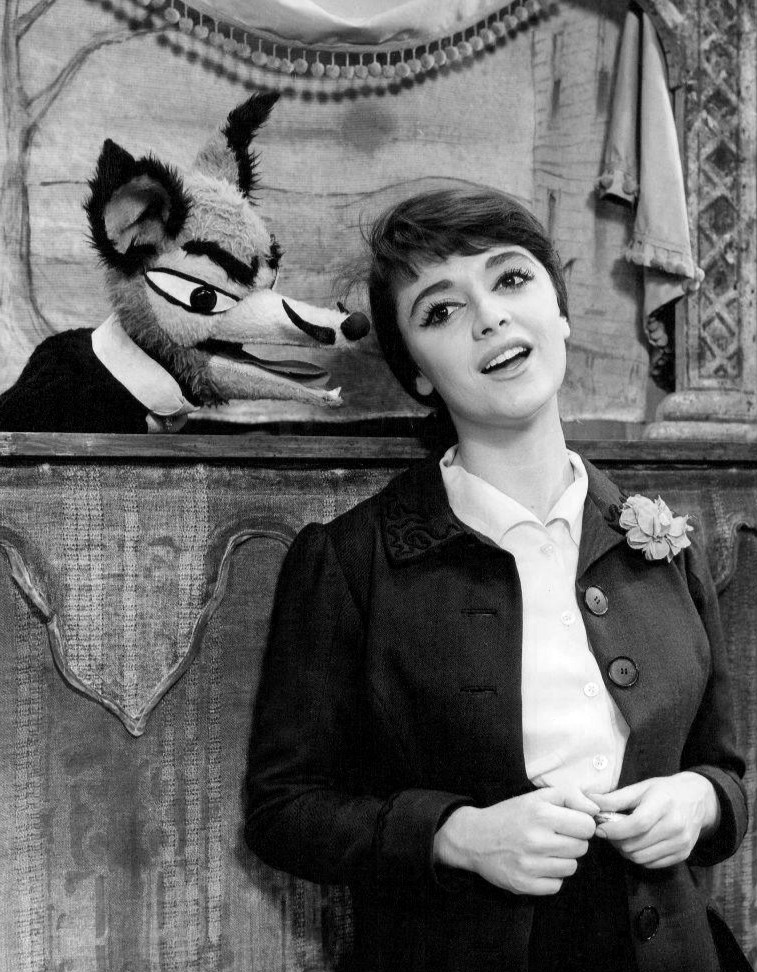
Alberghetti as Lili.

Carnival premiered at the National Theatre in Washington, D.C. where it ran March 9–25, 1961, with the production next opening in Philadelphia, Pennsylvania on March 27, 1961. The Broadway premiere of Carnival was on April 12, 1961, at the Imperial Theatre. The original cast starred Anna Maria Alberghetti as Lili, James Mitchell as Marco, Kaye Ballard as Rosalie, Pierre Olaf as Jacquot, Henry Lascoe and Jerry Orbach making his Broadway debut as Paul Berthalet. Gower Champion both directed and choreographed with orchestrations by Philip J. Lang. The puppets were designed and created by Tom Tichenor. Carnival was notable for its innovative staging: there was no overture, and before the play commenced the curtain was already raised to put on view a field with a few trees; at the play's beginning actors hauled in wagons and raised a tent as if they were setting up a traveling fair at a new site. Throughout the play actors entered and exited the stage via the aisles of the theater, where occasional bits of the action were played. Carnival was an instant hit with critics and audiences: John Chapman of the Daily News declared the play "enchantment from the moment the houselights go down" while in the Mirror Robert Coleman reported how the premiere's audience "blistered their palms in affectionate welcome to the town's new song and dance triumph." Carnival ran on Broadway for 719 performances, moving from the Imperial to the Winter Garden Theatre on December 20, 1962, where it ran until January 5, 1963.

In the early stages of developing Carnival, Merrick had envisioned Lili as a dancing rather singing role as in the parent film Lili, and had hoped that film's star Leslie Caron would recreate the Lili role on Broadway. This course proving untenable, the Lili role in Carnival was developed as a singing role for which Carol Lawrence was for a time a front runner. However, Merrick's ultimate choice for the role was Anna Maria Alberghetti, an Italian born lyric soprano who, at twenty-four, had eighteen years experience as a singer and had a light resume of screen acting credits, mostly on television. Before Carnival, Alberghetti had two evident credits as a musical stage actress, having appeared at the Oakdale Theatre in Wallingford CT in productions of Rose-Marie and The Firefly in, respectively, 1959 and 1960. It has been reported that Merrick cast Alberghetti in Carnival after a January 1961 viewing of her cabaret act in Philadelphia, where the singer's audience interaction had made a favorable impression. However, Alberghetti has stated that Merrick had her audition after seeing her at the Oakdale Musical Theater in 1960, and her casting as Lili was reported in The New York Times as early as November 1960.

Despite his early good opinion of Alberghetti, Merrick's relationship with the star of his musical turned acrimonious. Merrick refused to release Alberghetti from Carnival to avail herself of a film offer she received four months into the play's run, and when Alberghetti was hospitalized August 6, 1961 for anemia and exhaustion, Merrick reportedly either had an independent physician examine Alberghetti in hospital or had the hospitalized Alberghetti verify her illness in a lie detector test. Merrick loudly championed Anita Gillette, the understudy who played Lili during Alberghetti's ten-day sick leave, stating :"If I'd known she [Gillette] was this good when we were casting, she would have had the part", and when the company of Carnival greeted Alberghetti upon her return to the show Merrick presented her with a bouquet of roses variously described as plastic or dead. Gillette's brief stints in the lead of Carnival – she'd relieve Alberghetti during the latter's two-week vacation in December 1961 – had enough impact to launch a Broadway career for Gillette – although Carnival would remain the only hit in which she appeared. Conversely, Alberghetti – despite winning a Tony Award for her role in Carnival (tying with Diahann Carroll) – would never appear in another Broadway production, subsequently refocusing on her cabaret career. She did, however, occasionally appear in regional theatrical productions.

=== National tours ===
The first national tour of Carnival opened in December 1961 in Rochester, New York and was headlined by Susan Watson (Lili), Ed Ames (Paul Berthalet), Jonathan Lucas (Marco), Jo Anne Worley (Rosalie), Johnny Haymer (Jacquot) and Alfred Dennis (Schlegel). In April 1962 Susan Watson joined the Broadway production, taking over from Anna Maria Alberghetti who then headlined the touring company's San Francisco production; subsequently Carla Alberghetti would regularly play the role of Lili in the touring company although Anna Maria Alberghetti again assumed the role in the touring company's Los Angeles production which opened at the Philharmonic Auditorium in June 1962. Also both Anna Maria Alberghetti and Jerry Orbach would reprise their Broadway roles in an eight-week engagement of Carnival which opened at the Shubert Theater in Chicago in November 1962. The second national tour of Carnival opened at the Bushnell Memorial Theater in Hartford, Connecticut on October 18, 1962, and ran until May 11, 1963. The cast featured Elaine Malbin as Lili, David Daniels (Paul Berthalet), Don Potter (Jacquot) and Marge Cameron (Rosalie); Ed Ames also played Paul Berthalet at some engagements.

=== International ===
The West End production of Carnival opened at the Lyric Theatre in February 1963; this production – which had premiered at the Grand Theatre in Leeds November 22, 1962 and also played at the King's Theatre in Glasgow opening there December 12, 1962 – featured Gower Champion's staging for the Broadway production recreated by Lucia Victor and Doria Avila. James Mitchell reprised his Broadway role as Marco co-starring with Michael Maurel, Shirley Sands, Sally Logan as Lili, Bob Harris and Francis de Wolff. This cast recorded a cast album before the production had actually opened on the West End, where it would only play for 34 performances.

The Australian production of Carnival opened in Sydney in September 1962. It starred Patricia Moore, who had played Eliza Doolittle in the second cast of My Fair Lady. The male lead was played by Kevin Colson, an actor who was also a Channel 9 news reader. Jill Perryman played Rosalie.

== Notable revivals ==
Carnival has not played on Broadway since the original production closed. There have been two Off-Broadway revivals, the first a production by the New York City Center Light Opera Company which began a month-long engagement on December 12, 1968. Peter Howard, who had been the dance arranger for the original Broadway production of Carnival! was the musical director for the City Center production whose cast included Victoria Mallory (Lili), Leon Bibb (Paul Berthalet), Richard France (Marco), Karen Morrow (Rosalie), Carmine Caridi (Schlegel) and Pierre Olaf who reprising his Broadway role as Jacquot. The City Center production is seemingly unique among major productions of Carnival in making the show's love story an interracial one by casting an African-American actor in the role of Paul.

Carnival again played at New York City Center in 2002 as an Encores! production directed by Kathleen Marshall which starred Anne Hathaway as Lili and featured puppets by the Jim Henson Company, New York Muppet Workshop; the cast also included Brian Stokes Mitchell (Paul Berthalet), Douglas Sills (Marco), Debbie Gravitte (Rosalie), David Costabile (Jacquot) and David Margulies (Schlegel). Ben Brantley in his The New York Times review praised the Encores! concert, describing Hathaway as convincing in the role even though "Lili may be the most unworldly heroine ever in a Broadway musical, dangerously blurring the lines between innocence and mental deficiency". It was announced in January 2004 that Julian Schlossberg planned to produce a revival of Carnival to run on Broadway. Schlossberg hoped to feature the principal actors from the Encores! concert production in a full-scale rendering of the play, and also hoped that Encores! director Kathleen Marshall and the Jim Henson puppets would come on board for the revival. The announcement also stated that the book for this revival of Carnival would be reworked by Thomas Meehan. This revival did not materialize.

There have been two Off-Off Broadway revivals of Carnival, the first a 1977 Equity Library Theatre (ELT) production which ran November 3 – November 20. This was the first musical directed by Susan H. Schulman; the production featured Sue Anne Gershenzon (Lili), Ross Petty (Paul Berthalet), Joel Craig (Marco), Laura Kenyon (Rosalie), Jack Hoffman (Jacquot) and Carl Don (Schlegel). Schulman subsequently mounted Carnival for the Pittsburgh Civic Light Opera (CLO) in the summer of 1982 with Gershenzon, Petty and Hoffman reprising their ELT roles; the CLO production also featured Keith Curran (Marco) and Lenora Nemetz (Rosalie). In reviewing the CLO production, Terry Hazlett of the Observer-Reporter observed: "On paper, perhaps, [Carnival] is a lackluster piece. The show contains only one memorable song: 'Love Makes the World Go 'Round', has few production numbers and asks the audience to believe a young woman is so naive she doesn't make the obvious connection between a puppeteer and his puppets. But director Susan H. Schulman and choreographer Steven Gelfer infuse a great deal of life into 'Carnival' by making it just that – a carnival."

Carnival also played at the Curran Theatre in San Francisco in 1961 starting in late Aprilz It was part of the national tour though shorter than other runs within the California segment of its run.

In 1993 the York Theatre company revival of Carnival played at theatre at St. Peter's Church March 31–May 2. This production was directed/choreographed by Pamela Hunt and featured Glory Crampton (Lili), Robert Michael Baker (Paul Berthalet), Paul Schoeffler (Marco), Karen Mason (Rosalie), Robert Lydiard (Jacquot) and William Linton (Schlegel). In his New York Magazine review of the York Theatre production John Simon characterized the original Carnival! as "a ramshackle production of a sentimental movie [that] was saved on Broadway by Gower Champion and adept casting" and opined: "The York Theatre production of Carnival does what York is best at – taking a questionable show and making it unquestionably amateurish." Stephen Holden of The New York Times found the York Theatre production of Carnival: "a rough-and-tumble singing storybook in which the members of a third-rate French circus troupe smilingly send up their own mediocrity...The show, a double allegory of a girl's growing up and of love overcoming despair, is potentially treacly stuff, and a production this intimate risks magnifying the sweetness to a terminally gooey level. But Pamela Hunt...has tightly controlled its hokier aspects. In her hands, Carnival becomes a brash musical farce that turns sentimental only when absolutely required."

Both the Equity Library Theatre and Encores! stagings were taped for the New York Public Library Billy Rose Theatre Collection archives.

Anna Maria Alberghetti reprised the role of Lili in a production of Carnival which played the Valley Music Theater in Woodland Hills, Los Angeles for two weeks in February 1966, and which also featured James Mitchell and Ed Ames reprising their roles from, respectively, the Broadway and national touring companies of Carnival.

Director/choreographer Robert Longbottom directed a revival of Carnival which ran from February 17 to March 11, 2007, at the Kennedy Center's Eisenhower Theatre in Washington, D.C., with a cast which included Ereni Sevasti (Lili), Jim Stanek (Paul Berthalet), Sebastian La Cause (Marco), Natascia Diaz (Rosalie), Michael Arnold (Jacqout), and Jonathan Lee Iverson (Schlegel). This production, which introduced a revised book by Francine Pascal (sister of Michael Stewart) was a critical hit, as evidenced by the reviews of Paul Harris in Variety: "So where has this little gem been hiding? Following the original David Merrick/Gower Champion production's 719-[performance] run on Broadway in the early '60s, Carnival largely disappeared into the neglected musical dungeon, with only a smattering of noteworthy escapes since, including a 2002 City Center Encores! revival. The Bob Merrill and Michael Stewart tuner has surfaced at the Kennedy Center in delightful shape, under the discerning eye of director-choreographer Robert Longbottom." and Peter Marks of The Washington Post: "No musical in recent years has looked or sounded better on a Kennedy Center stage than the revival of 'Carnival' that has been buffed to a ravishing sheen by director Robert Longbottom...If the Kennedy Center's goal here was to dress a difficult, neglected work in a coat of contemporary artistry, the aim has been achieved."

The Paper Mill Playhouse mounted Carnival in 2006, the play running March 8 to April 19 under the direction of Erica Schmidt with a cast including Elena Shaddow (Lili), Charles Pollock (Paul Berthalet), Paul Schoeffler (Marco), Jennifer Allen (Rosalie), Eric Michael Gillett (Jacquot) and Nick Wyman (Schlegel). In her The New York Times write-up of the Paper Mill revival, Naomi Siegel characterizes Carnival as "an also-ran among American musicals [which] simply never entered the Broadway pantheon" and specifies the dark elements she feels make Carnival overall problematic – "the bleakness of the leading characters -- Lili, a forlorn orphan looking for love in all the wrong places; Marco, a second-rate magician with a Lothario complex; and Paul, a former dancer, wounded in the war and now forced to perform as a puppeteer and miserable in the process...[Also] the underlying theme of child exploitation...with a subtle but present sexual subtext" – before assessing the Paper Mill production as "[a] revival [which] reminds us of the genuine charm of the work and provides several show-stopping numbers for its talented players [but] does little to dispel the shadow that the play casts." Paper Mill had first presented Carnival in 1964, opening 11 February with Liza Minnelli, then seventeen, in one of her earliest stage roles as Lili. Minnelli debuted in the role in a production at the Mineola Playhouse which opened January 28, 1964.

Darko Tresnjak directed a revival of Carnival which ran from August 12 to September 18, 2010, at the Goodspeed Opera House in East Haddam CT under the auspices of Goodspeed Musicals which had previously mounted Carnival in 1986. The 2010 Goodspeed production of Carnival, which retained Francine Pascal's revisions for the 2007 Kennedy Center production, had in its cast Lauren Worsham (Lili), Adam Monley (Paul Berthalet), Nathan Klau (Jacquot), Mike McGowan (Marco), Michelle Blakely (Rosalie) and Laurent Giroux (Schlegel) with the last-named role taken over by Michael Kostroff. In his review of the 2010 Goodspeed production, Frank Rizzo of Variety described Carnival as being both a "bittersweet tuner that touches on sadness, desperation and remoteness" and "an entertainment...that features magic, puppetry and aerial work as well as a luxurious score ...Carnival isn't a natural for wide crossover appeal, but this tasteful, multilayered production does re-enforce the view that it is still a gem to be valued."

The Gloucester Stage Company mounted a revival of Carnival which ran from July 5 to July 22, 2012. The company's artistic director Eric C. Engel directed a cast headlined by Victoria Thornsbury (Lili), Gus Curry (Paul), Daniel Robert Sullivan (Marco) and Shannon Lee Jones (Rosalie).

From April 3 to 21, 2013, 42nd Street Moon presented a revival of Carnival at the Eureka Theater in San Francisco, directed by Greg MacKellan and starring Ashley Jarrett as Lili, Ryan Drummond as Paul, Bill Olson as Marco and Dyan McBride as Rosalie.

In April of 2025, Long Island's famed On Tour Company presented a production of "Carnival" directed by the legendary Salvatore Salerno which starred Hannah Levine as Lili, Jack Messinger as Paul, Justin Lapidus as Marco, and Kara Dobbs as Rosalie.

== Recordings ==
The Original Broadway Cast recording of Carnival was recorded April 23, 1961, with Eddie Heller producing in association with Arnold Maxin and Saul Schechtman conducting, as he had in the Broadway production; the album omits much of the dance music, as well as the songs "Magic, Magic", "Fairyland", and the "Mira" reprise. Rush-released that May as MGM 3946/Stereo S3946, the Broadway cast recording reached No. 1 on the Billboard album chart dated July 17, 1961. (The rights to recordings of Carnival defaulted to MGM Records by virtue of the musical's parent film Lili being a Metro-Goldwyn-Mayer release.)

The Original London Cast album of Carnival was also recorded by MGM; made before the show's disappointing West End run, the London cast recording was passed by MGM to EMI and released in January 1963 as HMV CSD-1476. The London Cast recording features the same tracks and edits as the Broadway cast album but includes some dialogue.

The CD of the original Broadway cast was released on June 8, 1989, on Decca Broadway; it includes nine bonus tracks, of which five are by Merrill. Kritzerland released the original London cast recording on CD, in limited quantities, in May 2011.

=== Chart positions ===
Year	Chart	Position
1961	Billboard Pop Albums (Billboard 200) (mono)	1

Preceded by Camelot by Original Broadway Stage Cast	Billboard 200 number-one album (mono); July 24, 1961 – July 30, 1961	Succeeded by Stars of a Summer Night by Various Artists

== Projected film ==
Arthur Freed hoped to produce a film version of Carnival for MGM (who automatically had film rights by virtue of having originated the film Lili). Gower Champion and Julius J. Epstein were attached to the project as, respectively, director and screenwriter. Unofficial reports cast the Carnival film with Yvette Mimieux mentioned as both a possible Lili and Rosalie, Robert Goulet as Paul Berthalet and George Chakiris as Marco; Broadway cast members James Mitchell and Pierre Olaf were also said to be reprising their stage roles for the film, and Anna Maria Alberghetti did a screen test for the film role of Lili in the spring of 1963.

Plans for the film version of Carnival were eventually scrapped, and the movie was never made.

== Awards and nominations ==
=== Original Broadway production ===
Year	Award	Category	Nominee	Result
1962	Tony Award	Best Musical		Nominated
1962	Tony Award	Best Author	Michael Stewart and Helen Deutsch	Nominated
1962	Tony Award	Best Performance by a Leading Actress in a Musical	Anna Maria Alberghetti	Won
1962	Tony Award	Best Performance by a Featured Actor in a Musical	Pierre Olaf	Nominated
1962	Tony Award	Best Direction of a Musical	Gower Champion	Nominated
1962	Tony Award	Best Producer of a Musical	David Merrick	Nominated
1962	Tony Award	Best Scenic Design	Will Steven Armstrong	Won
1962	New York Drama Critics' Circle Awards	Best Musical	Bob Merrill and Michael Stewart	Won
1962	Outer Critics Circle Award	Creative Contributions to the Season		Won
