= They're Playing Our Song (album) =

Studio album by Al Hirt
- Released: 1965
- Genre: Jazz
- Label: RCA Victor
- Producer: Jim Foglesong

Al Hirt chronology
| That Honey Horn Sound (1965) | They're Playing Our Song (1965) | The Happy Trumpet (1966) |

Professional ratings
Review scores
| Source | Rating |
|---|---|
| Allmusic | 3/5 stars |

They're Playing Our Song is an album by Al Hirt released by RCA Victor in 1965. The album was produced by Jim Foglesong. It was recorded at Webster Hall in Manhattan, New York City.

The album landed on the Billboard Top LPs chart, reaching #39 in 1966.

== Track listing ==
1. "I Had the Craziest Dream" (Harry Warren, Mack Gordon)
2. "Paper Doll" (Johnny S. Black)
3. "You'll Never Know" (Harry Warren, Mack Gordon)
4. "It's Been a Long, Long Time" (Jule Styne, Sammy Cahn)
5. "The Song from Moulin Rouge (Where Is Your Heart)" (Georges Auric, William Engvick)
6. "Autumn Leaves" (Joseph Kosma, Jacques Prévert, Johnny Mercer)
7. "There! I've Said It Again" (Redd Evans, David Mann)
8. "I've Heard That Song Before" (Jule Styne, Sammy Cahn)
9. "I'll Get By" (Fred E. Ahlert, Roy Turk)
10. "Deep Purple" (Peter DeRose, Mitchell Parish)
11. "Cherry Pink and Apple Blossom White" (Louiguy, Jacques Larue, Mack David)
12. "I'll Be Seeing You" (Sammy Fain, Irving Kahal)

== Chart positions ==
| Chart (1966) | Peak position |
|---|---|
| Billboard Top LPs | 39 |
