= Ella Jenkins =

American folk singer (1924–2024)

- Born: Ella Louise Jenkins; August 6, 1924; St. Louis, Missouri, U.S.
- Origin: Chicago, Illinois, U.S.
- Died: November 9, 2024 (aged 100) Chicago, Illinois, U.S.
- Genres: Folk, children's music
- Occupation: Singer-songwriter
- Instruments: Ukulele, harmonica, percussion
- Years active: 1950–2017
- Labels: Folkways Records; Smithsonian Folkways
- Website: www.ellajenkins.com

Ella Louise Jenkins (August 6, 1924 – November 9, 2024) was an American singer-songwriter and centenarian. Called the "First lady of children's music", she was a leading performer of folk and children's music. Her 1995 album Multicultural Children's Songs has long been the most popular Smithsonian Folkways release. She appeared on numerous children's television programs and in 2004, she received a Grammy Lifetime Achievement Award. According to culture writer Mark Guarino, "across her 67-year career, Jenkins firmly established the genre of children's music as a serious endeavor – not just for artists to pursue but also for the recording industry to embrace and promote."

== Early life and education ==
Jenkins was born to African American parents Annabelle Walker Jenkins and Obadiah Jenkins in St. Louis, Missouri, in 1924. When she was four years old, she moved to Chicago with her older brother and her now single mother, who worked as a domestic worker. She grew up in predominantly lower-middle-class neighborhoods in the south side of Chicago. Jenkins received no formal musical training, and developed an appreciation for music while growing up in a family of Christian Scientists with eclectic musical tastes. Her uncle, Floyd Johnson, introduced her to the harmonica and the blues of such renowned musicians as T-Bone Walker, Memphis Slim, Little Brother Montgomery and Big Bill Broonzy. Her family frequently moved around the south side and, as she moved to different neighborhoods, she learned new children's rhythms, rhymes and games. Gospel music became a part of her soundscape as neighborhood churches broadcast their services onto the street. She also enjoyed tap dancing lessons at the local theater and was able to go to the Regal Theater to see such performers as Cab Calloway, Count Basie, and Peg Leg Bates. Cab Calloway is the person who she credits with getting her interested in call and response singing. As a teenager, Jenkins was also exposed to music from around the world through records released by Folkways Records. In the late 1940s, Jenkins was involved with the Chicago branch of Congress of Racial Equality.

She graduated from DuSable High School in 1942. She then worked at the Wrigley Company and at the University of Chicago in a clerical position. Three of her female coworkers encouraged her to return to school, and she entered Woodrow Wilson Junior College (now Kennedy–King College) in 1945; later in life, she tracked down all three women to thank them. At Woodrow Wilson, she became interested in the music of other cultures through her Mexican, Cuban and Puerto Rican friends. She graduated from Woodrow Wilson in 1947 with an associate's degree. During these years, Jenkins was also an enthusiastic table tennis player. In 1948 she won the Chicagoland Women's Table Tennis Championship, and was invited to join the national table tennis team, but was unable to due to associated costs.

She went on to attend Roosevelt University for a year before transferring to San Francisco State University, where she picked up Yiddish and Hebrew songs from her Jewish residence hall neighbors. While attending SFSU, she began singing in coffeehouses for adult audiences. In 1951, she graduated from SFSU with a BA in Sociology with minors in Child Psychology and Recreation. Upon graduating, she returned to Chicago.

Jenkins and the city of Chicago celebrated her 100th birthday on August 4, 2024 at Ella Jenkins Park in the Old Town Triangle neighborhood. On November 9, 2024, Jenkins died at an assisted living facility in Chicago; she was 100.

== Music career ==
In Chicago, Jenkins began writing songs for children while volunteering in recreation centers and playing at Chicago folk clubs. She subsequently was hired as a Teenage Program Director for the YWCA in 1952. In 1956, while working at the YWCA, she was invited to perform on The Totem Club, a children's program which aired on WTTW, Chicago's NET (forerunner of PBS) affiliate. She was soon offered a regular job as the host of a Thursday afternoon program on the channel, which she titled This is Rhythm. This made Jenkins one of the nation's first African-American television hosts. After landing the job, she left her position at the YWCA. She invited guests from diverse cultures, including Odetta and Big Bill Broonzy, to share their music's rhythms on her show.

You Sing a Song and I'll Sing a Song (1966)

In 1956, Jenkins decided to give herself five years to try working as a full-time musician. Later that year, Jenkins met American folklorist, educator and record producer Kenneth S. Goldstein at the Gate of Horn folk music club in Chicago. Goldstein recommended that she bring a demo tape to Moses Asch, the founder of Folkways Records. Asch was receptive to her music and in 1957, her first album, Call-And-Response: Rhythmic Group Singing, was released by Folkways.

In the early 1960s, Jenkins hosted a radio show called Meetin' House. In 1962, Jenkins was offered the opportunity to work for the School Assembly Service, which developed educational programs for schools. Jenkins developed "Adventures in Rhythm", a program aimed at teenagers, which she took on the road and put on at school assemblies until September 1963. She and musician Harold Hampton Murray engaged the students with their call-and-response style and their appeal to "[students'] desire for forbidden knowledge," by presenting songs as ways to "convey histories that were not in their textbooks". Jenkins and Murray, who was also African American, faced prejudice and racism throughout their tour. In 1964, she performed at Martin Luther King Jr.'s Illinois Rally for Civil Rights. The 1960s also marked the beginning of her business relationship with Bernadelle Richter, whom she met after Richter hired Jenkins to perform at the American Youth Hostel folk weekend. Richter "handled the business" of Jenkins' career, leaving her to focus on compositions and performances.

Jenkins was holding music workshops for children's educators by the early 1970s.

Jenkins began to receive wider attention in the early 1980s, after appearing as a guest on Sesame Street and being subsequently invited to appear on Mister Rogers' Neighborhood. In 1985, she appeared on Free at Last, a television special about Martin Luther King Jr. which was hosted by LeVar Burton. On the special, Jenkins performed the song "You Better Leave Segregation Alone". She later made television appearances on NBC's Today Show and PBS's Barney & Friends.

As a performer and educator, Jenkins traveled extensively, performing her songs on all seven continents (even Antarctica). As she traveled, she not only shared her music and experiences but also learned about the cultures of the people she is visiting, taking with her musical traditions and languages that she then shared with her audiences. She performed at America's Reunion on the Mall in 1993, America's Millennium Celebration in 2000, and at Smithsonian's 150th Birthday Party on the Mall in Washington, DC in 1996. In collaboration with the John F. Kennedy Center for the Performing Arts, she acted as a U.S. delegate to Hong Kong, the People's Republic of China, and the former Soviet Union. She was a performer at the Ravinia Festival in Highland Park, Illinois for 40 years.

In 2017, she was named a recipient of the National Heritage Fellowship by the National Endowment for the Arts. Jenkins never officially retired, although she stopped giving public performances after the onset of the COVID-19 pandemic in 2020.

=== Albums ===
Folkways Records and Smithsonian Folkways Recordings released 39 albums by Jenkins, including the popular 1966 album You'll Sing a Song and I'll Sing a Song and the 1995 album Multicultural Children's Songs. Jenkins' repertoire included nursery rhymes, holiday songs, bilingual songs, international songs, rhythmic chants, and original songs. Her 1960 album, Adventures in Rhythm, released by Scholastic, was intended for classroom use. Nearly all of her albums include children singing with her.

Jenkins' albums often drew on African and African-American music. Her second album, Adventures in Rhythm, incorporated West and North African chants, and her third album, African American Folk Rhythms, included the song "No More Auction Block", which was sung by African-American soldiers during the American Civil War. Her 1970 album, A Long Time, included African American spirituals and songs from the civil rights movement.

As a recording artist, Jenkins gained extensive recognition. Her recordings received two Grammy Award nominations in the category of Best Musical Album for Children, and in 2004, she was recognized with a Grammy Lifetime Achievement Award. Jenkins' final album, Camp Songs with Ella Jenkins and Friends, was released in 2017.

== As an educator ==
Jenkins saw children as genuine, down to earth people who should be listened to and recognized as having much to offer. Fellow music educator Patricia Shehan Campbell called her as "a pioneer in her early and continuing realization that children have something to sing about, that the essence of who they are may be expressed through song, and that much of what they need to know of their language, heritage, and current cultural concepts may be communicated to them through song". Jenkins used call-and-response singing to promote group participation.

== Awards and recognition ==
=== Music awards ===
Year	Award	Category	Album	Result	Ref
1991	Parents' Choice Award		Come Dance By the Ocean	Won	
1995	American Academy of Children's Entertainment	Best Variety Performer Award		Won	
1999	American Society of Composers, Authors and Publishers	Lifetime Achievement Award		Won	
2000	AFIM Indie Awards	Children's Music	A Union of Friends Pulling Together	Honorable mention	
2000	Grammy Awards	Best Musical Album for Children	Ella Jenkins and a Union of Friends (1999)	Nominated	
2004	Grammy Awards	Lifetime Achievement Award		Won	
2005	Grammy Awards	Best Musical Album for Children	cELLAbration: A Tribute to Ella Jenkins (2004)	Won	
2012	Association for Library Service to Children	Notable Children's Recordings	Ella Jenkins: A Life of Song (2011)	Won	

=== Other awards ===
- Named Honorary Citizen of Louisville, Kentucky (1979, International Year of the Child)
- National Academy of Recordings Arts and Sciences, Chicago Chapter, Governor's Award (1989) contribution in children's recording and performance
- Pioneer in Early Television Citation, the National Museum of American History (1990)
- Proclamation of Ella Jenkins Day (December 12) in Chicago (1992)
- Kohl Lifetime Achievement Award (1994)
- Honorary Doctorate of Human Letters from the Erikson Institute (2004)
- Inducted into the San Francisco State University Alumni Hall of Fame (2004)
- Fellow Award in Music from United States Artists (2009)
- Living Legends for Service to Humanity Award (2011)
- Lifetime achievement award, Time Out Chicago's Hipsqueak Awards
- Fifth Star Award from the City of Chicago (2015)
- National Endowment for the Arts's National Heritage Fellowship recipient (2017)
- The Ella Jenkins Park in Chicago was the site of a celebration of her 100th birthday.

== Legacy ==
Jenkins was dubbed the "First Lady of Children's Song". As noted in an obituary to Jenkins, "Before Jenkins, children's music in the United States consisted primarily of simplified, often cartoonish renditions of classical music". She has been cited as an influence of later children's musicians, such as Dan Zanes.

A Life of Song: The Story of Ella Jenkins. The First Lady of Children's Music was published by Gloo Books on February 1, 2024. It is the first kids picture book published about the life of Ella Jenkins. Author Ty-Juana Taylor noted that "Ms. Jenkins has used music as a tool to bridge and unite people across the world, especially in highly divisive times of the U.S. Civil Rights era." The book is illustrated by Jade Johnson.

Academic Gayle F. Ward plans to release a biography of Jenkins in 2025 through Chicago University Press.

== Discography ==
=== 1950s and 1960s ===
- Call-and-Response Rhythmic Group Singing (1957, reissued 1990)
- Adventures in Rhythm (1959, reissued 1989, 1992)
- African-American Folk Rhythms (1960, reissued 1998)
- This-a-Way-That-a-Way (1961, reissued 1989)
- This is Rhythm (1961, reissued 1994)
- Rhythm & Game Songs for Little Ones (1964, reissued 1991)
- Songs and Rhythms From Near and Far (1964, reiussed 1997)
- You'll Sing a Song and I'll Sing a Song (1966, reissued 1989)
- Play Your Instruments & Make a Pretty Sound (1968, reissued 1994)
- Counting Games & Rhythms for the Little Ones (1969, reissued 1990)

=== 1970s ===
- A Long Time (1970, reissued 1992, 2024)
- Rhythms of Childhood (1970, reissued 1989)
- Seasons for Singing (1970, reissued 1990)
- And One And Two & Other Songs for Pre-School and Primary Children (1971, reissued 1990)
- My Street Begins at My House (1971, reissued 1989)
- Little Johnny Brown with Ella Jenkins and Girls and Boys from "Uptown" (Chicago) (1972, reissued 1990)
- This-A-Way That-A-Way (1973, reissued 1989, 1992)
- Nursery Rhymes: Rhyming & Remembering for Young Children & for Older Girls & Boys with Special Language Needs (1974, reissued 1990)
- Jambo and Other Call and Response Songs and Chants (1974, reissued 1996)
- Growing Up With Ella Jenkins (1976, reissued 1990)
- We Are America's Children (1976)
- Songs, Rhythms And Chants for the Dance (1977, reissued 1982, 2000)
- Travellin' with Ella Jenkins: – A Bilingual Journey (1979, reissued 1989)

=== 1980s ===
- I Know the Colors of the Rainbow (1981)
- Looking Back and Looking Forward (1981)
- Early Early Childhood Songs (1982, reissued 1996)
- Hopping Around from Place to Place Vol. 1 (1983; reissued 1999, 2015)
- Hopping Around from Place to Place Vol. 2 (1983; reissued 2000, 2015)

=== 1990s ===
- Live at the Smithsonian (1991)
- For the Family (1991)
- Come Dance by the Ocean (1991)
- Multicultural Children's Songs (1995)
- Holiday Times (1996)
- Songs Children Love To Sing (1996)
- Ella Jenkins and A Union of Friends Pulling Together (1999)

=== 2000s and 2010s ===
- Sharing Cultures With Ella Jenkins (2003)
- cELLAbration: A Tribute to Ella Jenkins (2004)
- A Life of Song (2011)
- Get Moving with Ella Jenkins (2012)
- 123s and ABCs (2014)
- More Multicultural Children's Songs (2014)
- Camp Songs with Ella Jenkins and Friends (2017)

== Filmography ==
- Ella Jenkins Live at the Smithsonian (1991)
- For the Family! (1991)
- cELLAbration Live! A Tribute to Ella Jenkins (2007)

== See also ==
- List of centenarians (musicians, composers and music patrons)
