= Horn A-Plenty =

Studio album by Al Hirt
- Released: 1962
- Genre: Jazz
- Label: RCA Victor
- Producer: Steve Sholes

Al Hirt chronology
At the Mardi Gras (1962)	Horn A-Plenty (1962)	Trumpet and Strings (1962)

Professional ratings
Review scores
Source	Rating
Allmusic	3/5 stars
New Record Mirror	4/5 stars

Horn A-Plenty is a big band album by Al Hirt that was released in 1962 by RCA Victor. The album was arranged and conducted by Billy May and performed by a group of top Hollywood session musicians.

The album reached number twenty four on the Billboard 200 chart.

== Track listing ==
1. "Holiday for Trumpet" (Mario Ruiz Armengol)
2. "That Old Feeling" (Sammy Fain, Lew Brown)
3. "Easy Street" (Harold Arlen, Johnny Mercer)
4. "Baby Won't You Please Come Home" (Charles Warfield, Clarence Williams)
5. "Till There Was You" (Meredith Willson)
6. "Margie" (Con Conrad, J. Russel Robinson, Benny Davis)
7. "Swing Low, Sweet Chariot" (Traditional)
8. "Theme from Carnival" ("Love Makes the World Go 'Round") (Bob Merrill)
9. "Do Nothin' Till You Hear From Me" (Duke Ellington, Bob Russell)
10. "Rumpus" (Ann Ronell)
11. "Memories of You" (Andy Razaf, Eubie Blake)
12. "I'll Take Romance" (Oscar Hammerstein II, Ben Oakland)

== Chart positions ==
Chart (1962)	Peak position
Billboard Top LPs	24
