= Honey in the Horn (album) =

Studio album by Al Hirt
- Released: 1963
- Studio: RCA Studio B, Nashville
- Genre: Jazz
- Length: 29:04
- Label: RCA Victor
- Producer: Chet Atkins, Steve Sholes

Al Hirt chronology
Trumpet and Strings (1962)	Honey in the Horn (1963)	Our Man in New Orleans (1963)

Professional ratings
Review scores
Source	Rating
Allmusic	4.5/5 stars
The Penguin Guide to Jazz Recordings	2.5/4 stars
Record Mirror	3/5 stars

Honey in the Horn is an album by Al Hirt released by RCA Victor in 1963. The album was produced by Chet Atkins and Steve Sholes. The Anita Kerr Singers provided the vocals for the album. The backing band on the album consisted of saxophonist Boots Randolph, bassist Bob Moore, guitarists Ray Edenton and Grady Martin, and pianist Floyd Cramer.

The single "Java" hit No. 1 on the Easy Listening chart and No. 4 on the Billboard Hot 100 in 1964. The album landed on the Billboard Top LPs chart, reaching No. 3.

== Track listing ==
1. "I Can't Get Started" (Ira Gershwin, Vernon Duke)
2. "Java" (Allen Toussaint, Alvin Tyler, Freddy Friday)
3. "The Man with a Horn" (Bonnie Lake, Eddie DeLange, Jack Jenney)
4. "Tansy" (Norrie Paramor)
5. "Night Theme" (Ray Peterson, Wayne Cogswell)
6. "Talkin' Bout That River" (Ray Charles)
7. "Fly Me to the Moon (In Other Words)" (Bart Howard)
8. "To Be in Love" (Beasley Smith, Teddy Best)
9. "Al Di La" (Carlo Donida, Mogol)
10. "Malibu" (George Weiss, Hub Atwood)
11. "Theme from a Dream" (Boudleaux Bryant)
12. "I'm Movin' On" (Hank Snow)

== Chart positions ==
Chart (1963)	Peak position
Billboard Top LPs	3

Singles

Year	Single	Chart	Peak position
1964	"Java"	Billboard Hot 100	4
1964	"Java"	Easy Listening (Billboard)	1
