= Al's Place (song) =

Single by Al Hirt
- B-side: "Mister Sandman"
- Released: April 1965
- Genre: Jazz
- Length: 2:17
- Label: RCA Victor
- Songwriter: Robert Allen

Al Hirt singles chronology
"Fancy Pants" (1965)	"Al's Place" (1965)	"The Silence (Il Silenzio)" (1965)

"Al's Place" is a song written by Robert Allen and recorded by Al Hirt. The song reached #57 on the Billboard Hot 100 and #13 on the Adult Contemporary chart in 1965.
