= Cotton Candy (instrumental) =

Single by Al Hirt

from the album Cotton Candy
- B-side: "Walkin"
- Released: 1964
- Genre: Jazz
- Length: 2:11
- Label: RCA Victor
- Songwriter(s): Russ Damon

Al Hirt singles chronology
"Java" (1963)	"Cotton Candy" (1964)	"Sugar Lips" (1964)

"Cotton Candy" is an instrumental written by Russ Damon and recorded by Al Hirt for his 1964 album, Cotton Candy. The piece was also featured on Hirt's greatest hits album, The Best of Al Hirt.

== Chart performance ==
"Cotton Candy" reached No. 15 on the Billboard Hot 100 and No. 3 on the Easy Listening chart in 1964.
