= Up Above My Head =

1941 song by Sister Rosetta Tharpe

"Up Above My Head, I Hear Music in the Air"

Single by Sister Rosetta Tharpe and Marie Knight
- Released: 1948
- Recorded: November 24, 1947
- Venue: New York City
- Genre: Gospel, R&B
- Length: 2:27
- Label: Decca
- Songwriter: Sister Rosetta Tharpe

"Up Above My Head" is a gospel song of traditional origin, first recorded in 1941 (as "Above My Head I Hear Music in the Air") by the Southern Sons, a vocal group formed by William Langford of the Golden Gate Quartet. The version that became best known was recorded in 1947 by Sister Rosetta Tharpe and Marie Knight as a duo.

== Background ==
The spiritual "Over My Head", apparently dating from the 19th century but of unknown authorship, contains many of the same lines as "Up Above My Head" – "Over my head / I hear music in the air../ There must be a God somewhere" – and may be presumed to be its origin. Civil rights leader Bernice Johnson Reagon changed the traditional words of the song in 1961, to "Over my head / I see freedom in the air...". In 1995, the National Association for Music Education (then known as the Music Educators National Conference) published a list of songs that "every American should know", which included "Over My Head".

== Sister Rosetta Tharpe recording ==
The recording by Sister Rosetta Tharpe and Marie Knight was made on November 24, 1947, in New York City for Decca Records. Besides Tharpe (vocals, guitar) and Knight (vocals), other musicians on the record were Sam Price (piano), George "Pops" Foster (bass), and Wallace Bishop (drums). The record reached number 6 on the Billboard "Race Records" chart in late 1948.

The song is formed in the traditional call and response format, with Tharpe singing a short line followed by Knight's "response" of the same line. There are seven lines (save responses) in each verse—the first six in call and response, and the seventh sung in unison. Tharpe's biographer, Gayle Wald, describes Tharpe's performance as "an ear-popping display of vocal fireworks", singing the opening line "so fierce and smooth at the same time that it anticipates 1960s soul." She comments that "especially in the driving instrumental bridge between verses, 'Up Above My Head' leaves the Sanctified Church behind and charts a straight course toward rhythm and blues," adding that the song "had an undeniable energy that paralleled the collective optimism of black people in the post-war years."

== Later recordings ==
"Up Above My Head (I Hear Music In The Air)"

Single by Al Hirt

from the album Sugar Lips
- A-side: "September Song"
- Released: October 1964
- Genre: Jazz
- Length: 2:14
- Label: RCA Victor
- Songwriter: Sister Rosetta Tharpe
- Producer: Chet Atkins

Al Hirt singles chronology
"Sugar Lips" (1964)	"Up Above My Head (I Hear Music In The Air)" (1964)	"Feelin' Fruggy" (1965)

It was recorded as a duet by Frankie Laine and Johnnie Ray on October 17, 1956. The song formed part of a double A-side release in the UK in October 1957. The single combined "Good Evening Friends" with the more fully titled "Up Above My Head, I Hear Music in the Air" (Philips PB 708), and peaked at number 25 in the UK Singles Chart.

It was released as a duet by Long John Baldry and Rod Stewart (as Long John Baldry and the Hoochie Coochie Men) in June 1964. It was as the B-side to United Artists UP 1056).

Al Hirt released a version of the song in 1964 on his album, Sugar Lips. The song went to number 12 on the Adult Contemporary chart and number 84 on the Billboard Hot 100. Hirt released a live version on his 1965 album, Live at Carnegie Hall. It was produced by Chet Atkins.

This song was also performed by Elvis Presley in the 1968 TV special, Elvis. It was inserted in the gospel medley with the songs: "Where Could I Go But To The Lord" and "Saved".

Dolly Parton and Patti LaBelle both performed an upbeat gospel rendition of this song on Dolly's variety show Dolly in 1987.

A blues version of the song was done by the American singer and musician Ruthie Foster on her 2007 album; The Phenomenal Ruthie Foster. Vanessa Collier also recorded the song for her 2017 album, Meeting My Shadow. A roots reggae version also exists recorded by the British act Matumbi on their 1978 album Seven Seals, which was produced by Dennis Bovell.

The song was covered by Rhiannon Giddens on her solo album Tomorrow Is My Turn.

== Lyrics ==
"Up above my head (up above my head)
I hear music in the air (I hear music in the air)
Up above my head (up above my head)
I hear music in the air (I hear music in the air)
I really do believe (I really do believe)
There's a Heaven up there."

Each additional verse is the same as the first, the word "music" replaced with another word (such as "singing," "shouting," et cetera). In the years following the song's introduction many have added more replacement words, which extend the song's length.

The line "Up above my head / I hear music in the air" was later used by the Trammps in their 1977 hit "Disco Inferno".
