= Fancy Pants (Al Hirt song) =

Single by Al Hirt

from the album That Honey Horn Sound
- B-side: "Star Dust"
- Released: January 1965
- Genre: Jazz
- Length: 1:52
- Label: RCA Victor
- Songwriter: Floyd Cramer
- Producer: Chet Atkins

Al Hirt singles chronology
"Feelin' Fruggy" (1965)	"Fancy Pants" (1965)	"Al's Place" (1965)

"Fancy Pants" is a song written by Floyd Cramer and was recorded by Al Hirt for his 1965 album, That Honey Horn Sound. The song reached #47 on the Billboard Hot 100 and #9 on the Adult Contemporary chart in 1965.

Floyd Cramer released his own version of the song in 1953 for the Abbott Records label.
