= Sugar Lips (song) =

Single by Al Hirt

from the album Sugar Lips
- B-side: "Poupee Brisee (Broken Doll)"
- Released: July 1964
- Genre: Jazz
- Length: 2:00
- Label: RCA Victor
- Songwriter(s): Billy Sherrill, Buddy Killen
- Producer(s): Chet Atkins

Al Hirt singles chronology
"Cotton Candy" (1964)	"Sugar Lips" (1964)	"Up Above My Head (I Hear Music in the Air)" (1964)

"Sugar Lips" is a song written by Billy Sherrill and Buddy Killen and recorded by Al Hirt for his 1964 album, Sugar Lips. The song reached No. 30 on the Billboard Hot 100 and No. 3 on the Easy Listening chart in 1964.

The song was featured on Hirt's greatest hits album, The Best of Al Hirt.

In the mid-to-late 1960s, the song was used as the theme for the TV game show Eye Guess.
