= Sister Rosetta Tharpe =

American gospel and rock musician (1915–1973)

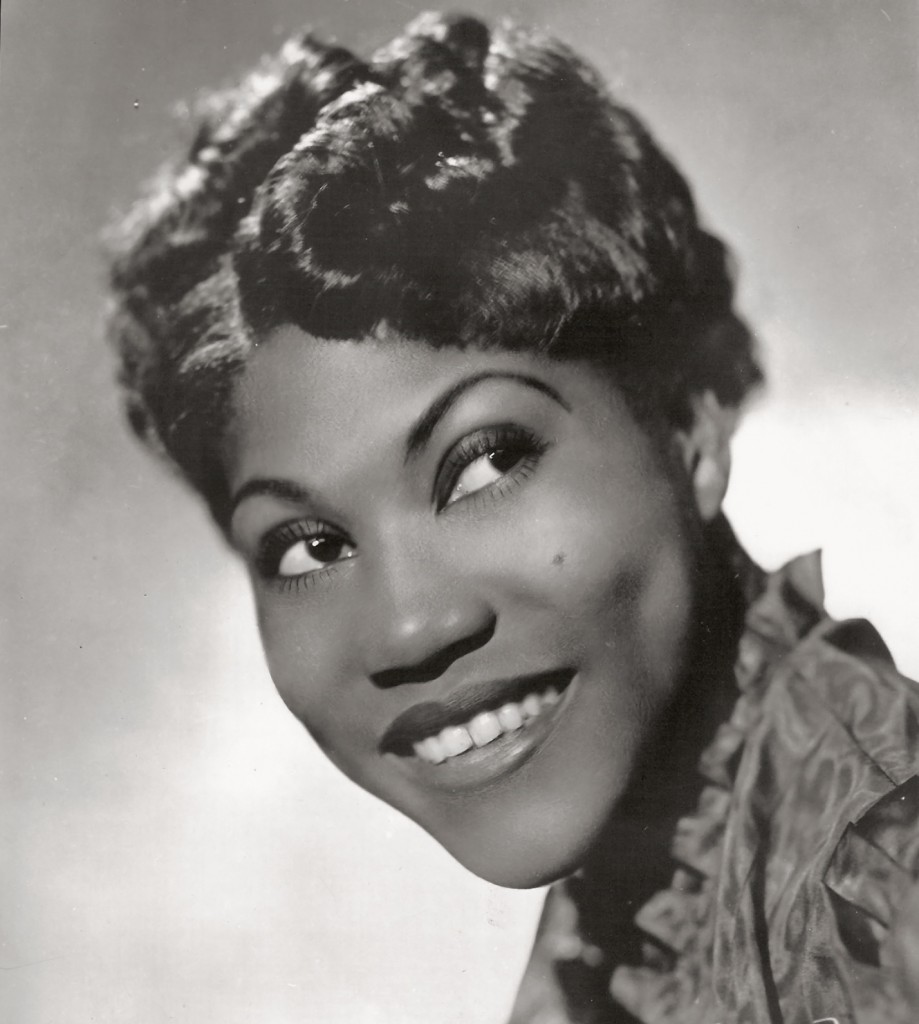
- Tharpe in 1938

Background information
- Born: Rosetta Nubin (or Rosether Atkins); March 20, 1915; Cotton Plant, Arkansas, U.S.
- Died: October 9, 1973 (aged 58) Philadelphia, Pennsylvania, U.S.
- Genres: Blues; gospel; rhythm and blues; jazz; rock and roll
- Occupations: Singer; songwriter
- Instruments: Vocals; guitar; piano
- Years active: 1919–1973

Sister Rosetta Tharpe (born Rosetta Nubin, March 20, 1915 – October 9, 1973) was an American singer, songwriter, and guitarist. She gained popularity in the 1930s and 1940s with her gospel recordings, characterized by a unique mixture of spiritual lyrics and electric guitar. She was rooted in a pentecostal church and became the first great recording star of gospel music, and was among the first gospel musicians to appeal to rhythm and blues and rock and roll audiences, later being referred to as "the original soul sister" and "the Godmother of Rock and Roll". She influenced early rock-and-roll musicians, including Tina Turner, Little Richard, Chuck Berry, Johnny Cash, Carl Perkins, Elvis Presley, and Jerry Lee Lewis.

Tharpe is among the first Chicago blues musicians to play the electric guitar. Her guitar-playing technique had a profound influence on the development of British blues in the 1960s. Her European tour with Muddy Waters in 1964, with a stop in Manchester on May 7, is cited as important by British guitarists such as Eric Clapton, Jeff Beck, and Keith Richards.

Willing to cross the line between sacred and secular by performing her music of "light" in the "darkness" of nightclubs and concert halls with big bands behind her, Tharpe pushed spiritual music into the mainstream and helped pioneer the rise of pop-gospel, beginning in 1938 with the recording "Rock Me" and with her 1939 hit "This Train". Her unique music left a lasting mark on more conventional gospel artists such as Ira Tucker, Sr., of the Dixie Hummingbirds. While controversial among conservative religious groups due to her forays into the pop world, she never left gospel music.

Tharpe's 1944 release "Down by the Riverside" was selected for the National Recording Registry of the U.S. Library of Congress in 2004, which noted that it "captures her spirited guitar playing and unique vocal style, demonstrating clearly her influence on early rhythm-and-blues performers" and cited her influence on "many gospel, jazz, and rock artists". ("Down by the Riverside" was recorded by Tharpe on December 2, 1948, in New York City, and issued as Decca single #48106.) Her 1945 hit "Strange Things Happening Every Day", recorded in late 1944, featured Tharpe's vocals and guitar, with Sammy Price (piano), bass and drums. It was the first gospel record to cross over, hitting No. 2 on the Billboard "race records" chart, the term then used for what later became the R&B chart, in April 1945. The recording has been cited as a precursor of rock and roll, and alternatively has been called the first rock and roll record. In May 2018, Tharpe was posthumously inducted into the Rock and Roll Hall of Fame as an Early Influence.

== Childhood ==
Tharpe was born on March 20, 1915, as Rosetta Nubin in Cotton Plant, Arkansas, to Katie Bell Nubin and Willis Atkins, who were cotton pickers. However, researchers Bob Eagle and Eric LeBlanc give her birth name as Rosether Atkins (or Atkinson), her mother's name being Katie Harper. Little is known of her father except that he was a singer. Tharpe's mother Katie was also a singer and a mandolin player, deaconess-missionary, and women's speaker for the Church of God in Christ (COGIC), which was founded in 1897 by Charles Harrison Mason, a black Pentecostal bishop, who encouraged rhythmic musical expression, dancing in praise and allowing women to sing and teach in church. Encouraged by her mother, Tharpe began singing and playing the guitar as Little Rosetta Nubin at the age of 6 and was cited as a musical prodigy.

About 1921, at age 6, Tharpe joined her mother as a regular performer in a traveling evangelical troupe. Billed as a "singing and guitar playing miracle", she accompanied her mother in performances that were part sermon and part gospel concert before audiences across the American South. In the mid-1920s, Tharpe and her mother settled in Chicago, Illinois, where they performed religious concerts at the Roberts Temple COGIC on 40th Street, occasionally traveling to perform at church conventions throughout the country. Tharpe developed considerable fame as a musical prodigy, standing out in an era when prominent black female guitarists were rare.

=== Marriage and stage name ===
In 1934, at age 19, she married Thomas Thorpe, a COGIC preacher, who accompanied her mother and her on many of their tours. The marriage lasted only a few years, but she decided to adopt a version of her husband's surname as her stage name, Sister Rosetta Tharpe. In 1938, she left her husband and moved with her mother to New York City. Although she married several times, she performed as Rosetta Tharpe for the rest of her life.

== Career ==
=== Early career ===
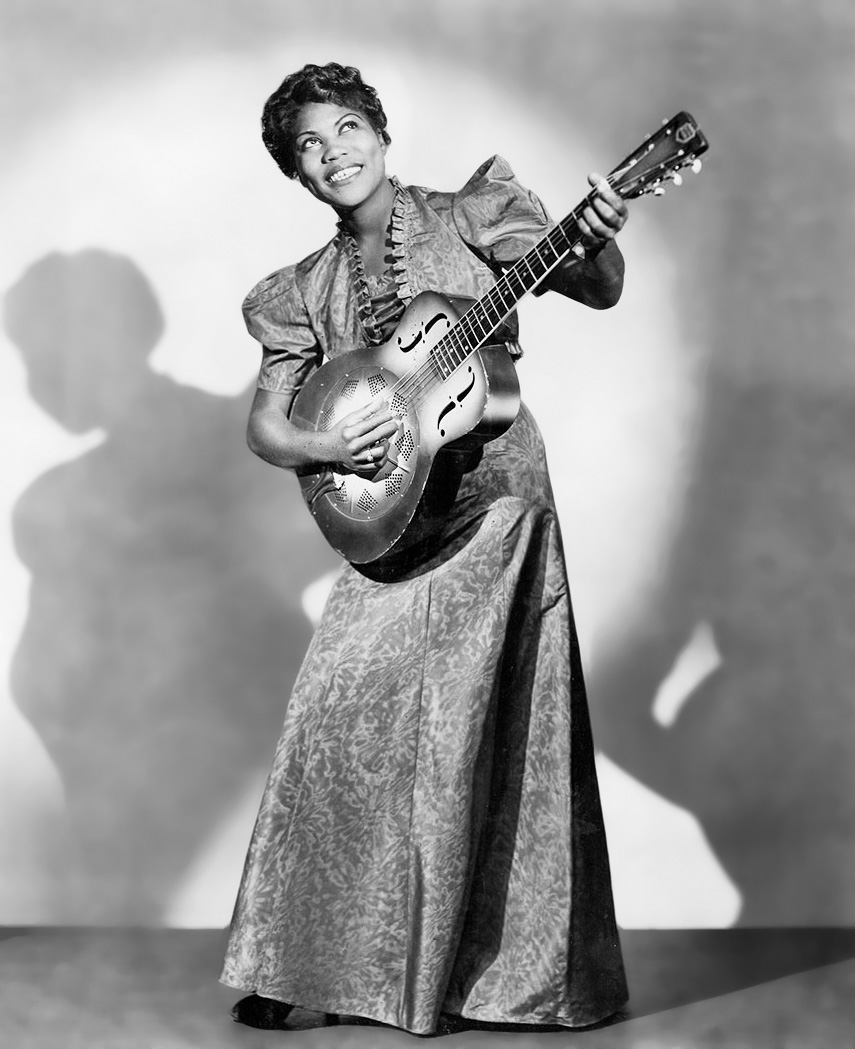
Tharpe posed with a guitar in 1938.

On October 31, 1938, at age 23, Tharpe recorded for the first time – four sides for Decca Records. The first gospel songs recorded by Decca, "Rock Me", "That's All", "My Man and I", and "The Lonesome Road", were instant hits, establishing Tharpe as an overnight sensation and one of the first commercially successful gospel recording artists. "Rock Me" influenced many rock-and-roll singers, such as Elvis Presley, Little Richard, and Jerry Lee Lewis. In 1942, music critic Maurie Orodenker, describing Tharpe's "Rock Me", wrote, "It's Sister Rosetta Tharpe for the rock and roll spiritual singing."

She signed a 10-year contract with Lucky Millinder. Tharpe officially joined Millinder's swing band in 1941 and toured with the band throughout the 1940s. Her records caused an immediate furor; many churchgoers were shocked by the mixture of gospel-based lyrics and secular-sounding music, but secular audiences loved them. Tharpe played on several occasions with the white singing group the Jordanaires.

Tharpe's appearances with Cab Calloway at Harlem's Cotton Club in October 1938 and in John Hammond's "Spirituals to Swing" concert at Carnegie Hall on December 23, 1938, gained her more fame, along with notoriety. Performing gospel music for secular nightclub audiences and alongside blues and jazz musicians and dancers was unusual, and, in conservative religious circles, a woman playing the guitar in such settings was frowned upon. Tharpe fell out of favor with segments of the gospel community.

By 1943, she considered rebuilding a strictly gospel act, but she was contractually required to perform more worldly material. Her nightclub performances, in which she would sometimes sing gospel songs amid scantily clad showgirls, caused her to be shunned by some in the gospel community. During this time, masculinity was directly linked to guitar skills. Tharpe was often offered the intended compliment that she could "play like a man", demonstrating her skills at guitar battles at the Apollo. Tharpe continued recording during World War II, one of only two gospel artists able to record V-discs for troops overseas.

Her song "Strange Things Happening Every Day" was recorded in 1944 with Sammy Price, Decca's house boogie woogie pianist; it showcased her virtuosity as a guitarist as well as her witty lyrics and delivery. It was the first gospel song to appear on the Billboard magazine Harlem Hit Parade. This 1944 record has been called the first rock and roll record. Tharpe toured throughout the 1940s, backed by various gospel quartets, including the Dixie Hummingbirds.

In 1946, Tharpe saw Marie Knight perform at a Mahalia Jackson concert in New York City. Tharpe recognized a special talent in Knight. Two weeks later, Tharpe showed up at Knight's doorstep, inviting her to go on the road. They toured the gospel circuit for a number of years, during which they recorded hits such as "Up Above My Head" and "Gospel Train". According to Tharpe's biographer Gayle Wald, she and Knight were also rumoured to be lovers.

=== Later career ===
Starting in 1949, their popularity took a sudden downturn and their relationship started to fade. Mahalia Jackson was starting to eclipse Tharpe in popularity, and Knight harbored a desire to break free as a solo act into popular music. Furthermore, around this time, Knight lost her children and mother in a house fire. That same year, to commemorate Tharpe's first anniversary of being a homeowner in Richmond, Virginia, Tharpe put on a concert at what is now the Altria Theater. Supporting her for that concert were the Twilight Singers, whom Rosetta adopted as her background singers for future concerts, renaming them the Rosettes.

Tharpe attracted 25,000 paying customers to her wedding to her manager Russell Morrison (her third marriage), followed by a vocal performance at Griffith Stadium in Washington, DC, in 1951. In 1952, Tharpe and Red Foley recorded the B-side "Have a Little Talk with Jesus", which is likely the first interracial duet recorded in the US. Only in 1968 did Billy Vera and Judy Clay have a hit as an interracial duet, "Storybook Children".

In 1956, Tharpe recorded an album with the gospel quartet the Harmonizing Four titled Gospel Train. In 1957, Tharpe was booked for a month-long tour of the UK by British trombonist Chris Barber.

=== 1964 European tour ===
Tharpe performing at the 1964 Helsinki Jazz Festival

In April and May 1964, Tharpe toured Europe as part of the Blues and Gospel Caravan, alongside Muddy Waters and Otis Spann, Ransom Knowling, and Little Willie Smith, Reverend Gary Davis, Cousin Joe, Sonny Terry, and Brownie McGhee. Tharpe was introduced on stage and accompanied on piano by Cousin Joe. Under the auspices of George Wein, the Caravan was stage-managed by Joe Boyd. A concert, in the rain, was recorded by Granada Television at the disused railway station at Wilbraham Road, Manchester, in May 1964. The band performed on one platform, while the audience was seated on the opposite platform.

According to Chris Lee of the University of Salford, the 1964 Manchester show "influenced nearly everyone who saw it".

== Later life and death ==
Tharpe's biographer said in 2018: "She influenced Elvis Presley, she influenced Johnny Cash, she influenced Little Richard". When asked about her music and about rock and roll, Tharpe is reported to have said, "Oh, these kids and rock and roll — this is just sped up rhythm and blues. I've been doing that forever".

Tharpe's performances were curtailed by a stroke in 1970, after which one of her legs was amputated as a result of complications from diabetes. On October 9, 1973, the eve of a scheduled recording session, she died in Philadelphia, Pennsylvania, as a result of another stroke. She was buried at Northwood Cemetery in Philadelphia.

== Musical influence ==
Tharpe's guitar style blended melody-driven urban blues with traditional folk arrangements and incorporated a pulsating swing that was a precursor of rock and roll. A National Public Radio article commented in 2017: "Rock 'n' roll was bred between the church and the nightclubs in the soul of a queer black woman in the 1940s named Sister Rosetta Tharpe".

Little Richard referred to her as his favorite singer when he was a child. In 1947, she heard Richard sing before her concert at the Macon City Auditorium and later invited him on stage to sing with her; it was Richard's first public performance outside of the church. Following the show, she paid him for his performance, which inspired him to become a performer. When Johnny Cash gave his induction speech at the Rock and Roll Hall of Fame, he referred to Tharpe as his favorite singer when he was a child; his daughter Rosanne Cash validated in an interview with Larry King that Tharpe was her father's favorite singer. Tharpe began recording with electric guitar in the 1940s on the song "That's All", which has been cited as an influence on Chuck Berry and Elvis Presley. Other musicians, including Aretha Franklin, Jerry Lee Lewis, and Isaac Hayes, have identified her singing, guitar playing, and showmanship as important influences on them. She was held in particularly high esteem by UK blues/jazz singer George Melly. Tina Turner credits Tharpe, along with Mahalia Jackson, as an early musical influence. Such diverse performers as Meat Loaf, Neil Sedaka, and Karen Carpenter have attested to the influence of Tharpe in the rhythmic energy she emanated in her performances (Carpenter's drum fills are especially reminiscent of Tharpe's "Chorlton Chug").

According to a PBS article, Elvis was influenced by five artists, including Sister Rosetta Tharpe. “She had a major impact ... when you see Elvis Presley singing songs early in his career, I think you [should] imagine he is channeling Rosetta Tharpe."

In 2018, singer Frank Turner wrote and performed the song "Sister Rosetta" about her influence and how she deserved to be in the Rock and Roll Hall of Fame. The single was released on July 3, 2019.

According to Cleveland.com, Tharpe "plugged into an electric guitar in the late 1930s and became a rock star before the men considered the pioneers of rock and roll had dreamt of doing so. She's the 'Godmother of rock and roll' who influenced every musician traditionally identified with helping launch the genre during the 1950s".

== Awards and legacy ==
A resurgence of interest in Tharpe's work led to a biography, several NPR segments, scholarly articles, and honors. A biography titled Shout, Sister, Shout! by Gayle F. Wald was published in 2007. The United States Postal Service issued a 32-cent commemorative stamp to honor Tharpe on July 15, 1998. In 2007, she was inducted posthumously into the Blues Hall of Fame. In 2008, a concert was held to raise funds for a marker for her grave, and January 11 of that same year was declared Sister Rosetta Tharpe Day in Pennsylvania. A gravestone was put in place later that year, and a Pennsylvania historical marker was approved for placement at her home in the Yorktown neighborhood of Philadelphia.

In 2011, BBC Four aired a one-hour documentary, Sister Rosetta Tharpe: The Godmother of Rock and Roll, written and directed by UK filmmaker Mick Csaky. In 2013, the film was shown in the US as part of the PBS series American Masters. The film has been aired numerous times in the UK and US, most recently in March 2015 to mark the 100th anniversary of Tharpe's birth. On March 20, 2015, UK newspaper The Guardian published a 100th-birthday tribute by Richard Williams.

Between August and October 2016, the musical play Marie and Rosetta, based on the relationship between Tharpe and Marie Knight, was staged by the Atlantic Theater Company in New York City.

On October 5, 2017, Tharpe was listed as a nominee for the 2018 Rock and Roll Hall of Fame inductions. On December 13, 2017, she was elected to the Rock and Roll Hall of Fame as an Early Influence.

In 2017, National Public Radio wrote about the artist's career and concluded with these comments: Tharpe "was a gospel singer at heart who became a celebrity by forging a new path musically... Through her unforgettable voice and gospel swing crossover style, Tharpe influenced a generation of musicians including Aretha Franklin, Chuck Berry and countless others... She was, and is, an unmatched artist."

A musical about her life named Shout, Sister, Shout!, based on the Gayle Wald biography of the same name and written in 2017 by playwright Cheryl West, was performed that year at the Pasadena Playhouse, two years later at Seattle Repertory Theatre, and in 2023 at Ford's Theatre in Washington, DC.

Between May and July 2025, the musical production Marie and Rosetta about Tharpe and her singing partner Marie Knight, written by George Brant and originally staged by the Atlantic Theater Company at the Linda Gross Theater between August and October 2016, was staged at the Rose Theatre in Kingston upon Thames and the Minerva Theatre in Chichester, with Beverley Knight portraying Tharpe.

Rolling Stone named Tharpe the sixth-greatest guitarist of all time in 2023.

In March 2025, Lizzo announced that she would portray Sister Rosetta in the upcoming biopic by Amazon MGM Studios.

In September 2025, Tharpe was selected for induction into the National Rhythm and Blues Hall of Fame.

=== Legacy preservation by family ===
Tharpe's legacy continues to be actively preserved by her great-niece TeAnna Atkins, an educator, writer, and historian. Based in Milwaukee, Wisconsin, Atkins has developed educational curricula, media projects, and public programs to honor Tharpe's groundbreaking contributions to gospel and rock and roll music. She manages the official family platforms, including sisterrosettafamily.com, and collaborates with cultural institutions, theaters, and museums to promote Tharpe's influence on music history. Through her work, Atkins amplifies Tharpe's role as a pioneering artist and ensures that her contributions remain recognized across generations.

== Discography ==
=== Albums ===
- The Lonesome Road (Decca, 1941)
- Gospel Hymns (Decca, 1944)
- Gospel Songs (Decca, 1947)
- Blessed Assurance (Decca, 1951)
- Gospel Train (Mercury, 1956)
- The Gospel Truth (Mercury, 1959)
- Sister Rosetta Tharpe (MGM, 1960)
- Spirituals in Rhythm (Promenade, 1960)
- Sister on Tour (Verve, 1961)
- The Gospel Truth (Verve, 1962)
- Precious Memories (Savoy, 1968)
- Gospel Keepsakes (MCA, 1983)
- Live in 1960 (Southland, 1991)
- Live at the Hot Club de France (BMG/Milan, 1991)
- Live In France: The 1966 Concert In Limoges (2024)

Her complete works up to 1961 were issued as seven double-CD box sets by the French label Frémeaux & Associés.

=== Charted singles ===
Year	Single	Chart Positions
Year	Single	US R&B
1945	"Strange Things Happening Every Day"	2
1948	"Precious Memories"	13
1948	"Up Above My Head, I Hear Music in the Air"	6
1949	"Silent Night (Christmas Hymn)"	6
