= The Harmonizing Four =

American black gospel quartet

The Harmonizing Four was an American black gospel quartet organized in 1927 and reaching peak popularity during the decades immediately following World War II.

Sources disagree as to the original membership when the group was established in 1927 to sing for school functions at Richmond, Virginia's Dunbar Elementary School. Some sources include Thomas Johnson and Levi Hansly as founding members, with others indicating they joined the group in the early 1930s after the departure of original first tenor Joe Curby and original bass Willie Peyton; likewise, eventual leader Joseph Williams is identified as a founding member in some sources, and others claiming he joined as much as six years later. In 1937 the group added Lonnie Smith, who later became father to keyboardist Lonnie Liston Smith.

The group recorded for Decca Records in 1943 and toured in the postwar years, performing at such high-profile events as the 1944 National Baptist Convention, to an audience of 40,000; the funeral ceremony for President Franklin Delano Roosevelt in 1945; and the wedding ceremony of gospel star Sister Rosetta Tharpe and Russell Morrison, an event recorded for a live album to which the group contributed four songs. During this period the group recorded for different labels, including Chicago company Religious Recording, Coleman, and MGM. As of the early 1950s, they signed with Philadelphia's Gotham Records, where they recorded some 40 songs before moving on in 1957 to Chicago's Vee-Jay Records, where they experienced their greatest popularity, thanks in part to one of the greatest of gospel bassers, Jimmy Jones. Smith retired in 1962, and following a period in the late 1960s of recording for various labels in various membership configurations, the group was essentially semi-retired for the ensuing decades.

== Radio ==
The Harmonizing Four began singing on WRNL, in Richmond, in 1943, soon after recording eight songs for Decca in New York City. Described as "the area's top quartet," the group "would have Sunday breakfast with Richmond for nearly two decades, sponsored by People's Furniture."

== Television ==
A rare video of a television appearance of The Harmonizing Four is them performing Amazing Grace on NBC's TV Gospel Time.

The group would undergo many changes in lineup over the years, with Joseph Williams, Thomas Johnson and Lonnie Smith remaining at the core. In 1958, the final lineup was achieved with the addition of Ellis Johnson, the son and namesake of Thomas Johnson, who was able to emulate the style and diction of the earlier Jimmy Jones, as bass singer. The group entered a period of high album output during this period, beginning with "God Will Take Care of You" and releasing over two dozen albums in this era. As they collaborated on these albums, they balanced traditional gospel songs with original music and, on a number of albums, Joseph Williams would have one spoken track to accompany a traditional gospel song. Examples of these are "House, Picture and Prayer" from "Shine On Me" (1967), "Come Ye, Disconsolate" from "40 Years Singing Gospel" (1968), "Tommie, Lonnie and Me" from "Tommie, Lonnie and Me" (1968) and "End of My Journey" from "One God" (1972). The group would continue until the deaths of Joseph Williams in 1988, Ellis Johnson in 1993, Lonnie Smith in 1995 and finally Thomas Johnson in 2003.

The song "All Things Are Possible" was used in the soundtrack of Saul Gone, the final episode of Better Call Saul, as background music as Saul Goodman is led into court for sentencing.
