= Peter Howard (conductor) =

Peter Howard (born Howard Weiss; July 29, 1927, in Miami, Florida – April 18, 2008, in Englewood, New Jersey) was an American musical theater arranger, conductor and pianist. Coming to prominence in the 1960s, he was the conductor and dance music arranger for the original Broadway productions of Hello, Dolly! and Annie and was the dance music arranger for the original Broadway productions of Chicago, 1776, The Tap Dance Kid and Crazy for You.
