= Gayle Wald =

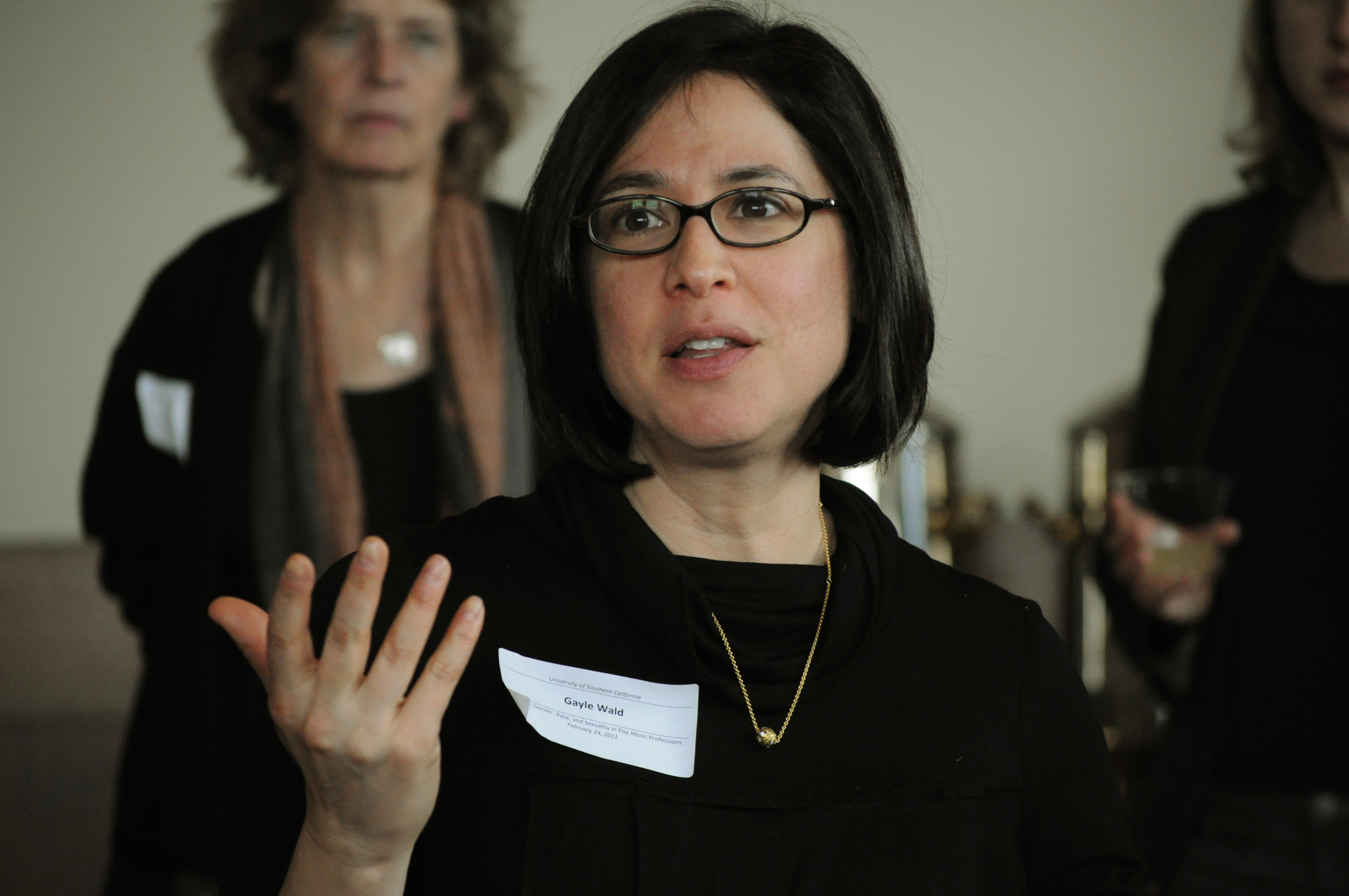
- Occupations: Professor of English and American Studies
- Awards: John Simon Guggenheim Memorial Foundation Fellowship (2012-13); National Endowment for the Humanities Fellowship (2012-13); National Endowment for the Humanities Fellowship (2005-06)

Academic background
- Education: University of Virginia (B.A., 1987); Princeton University (Ph.D., 1995)

Gayle Wald is a professor of English and American Studies at George Washington University and a Guggenheim Fellow. From 1994-95 she was Visiting Assistant Professor of English and American Studies at Trinity College in Hartford, Connecticut.

== Education ==
Wald graduated with a B.A. in English and French from the University of Virginia in 1987 and subsequently obtained a Ph.D. in English from Princeton University in 1995.

== Career ==
She is currently Professor of American Studies at George Washington University. Formerly she served as chair of English; currently she serves as chair of American Studies.

She has been a co-editor of the Journal of Popular Music Studies. She regularly writes pieces for newspapers and blogs.

She has also been coeditor of Bloomsbury's 33 1/3 series.

== Works ==
- Crossing the Line: Racial Passing in U.S. Literature and Culture (Duke University Press, 2000)
- Shout, Sister, Shout!: The Untold Story of Rock-and-Roll Trailblazer Sister Rosetta Tharpe (Beacon Press, 2007)
- It's Been Beautiful: Soul! and Black Power Television (Duke University Press, 2015)

Shout, Sister, Shout! is the basis for the documentary film Sister Rosetta Tharpe: The Godmother of Rock & Roll, directed by Mick Csaky. It is also the basis for the musical of the same name directed by Randy Johnson; book by Cheryl L. West. This opened at the Pasadena Playhouse in July 2017 and the Seattle Repertory Theater in November 2019. Another musical, Marie and Rosetta by George Brant at the Atlantic Theater Company uses the story.

In September 2019, Beacon released an audiobook of Shout, Sister, Shout! featuring Leslie Uggams and produced by Elizabeth Healy.

She is currently writing a book about children's musician Ella Jenkins.

== Awards and recognitions ==
- John Simon Guggenheim Memorial Foundation Fellowship, 2012–13
- National Endowment for the Humanities Fellowship, 2012–13
- National Endowment for the Humanities Fellowship, 2005-6

Wald has twice been awarded a National Endowment for the Humanities faculty fellowship: once in 2005-6 and again in 2012-13.

She received the John Simon Guggenheim Memorial Foundation Fellowship], 2012-13.
