= Al Hirt =

American trumpeter and bandleader (1922–1999)

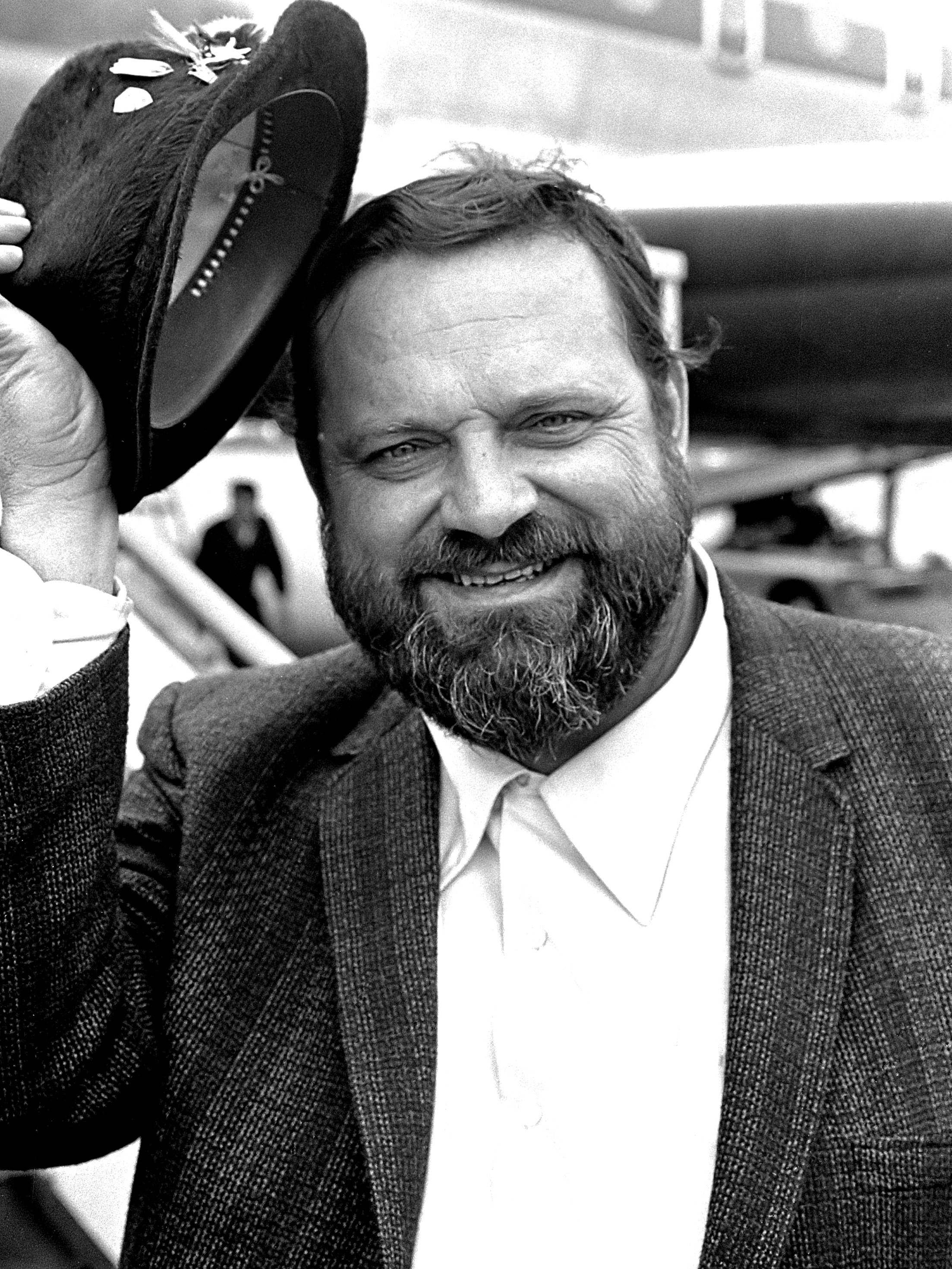
- Hirt in 1966

Background information
- Also known as: Jumbo; The Round Mound of Sound
- Born: Alois Maxwell Hirt; November 7, 1922; New Orleans, Louisiana, U.S.
- Died: April 27, 1999 (aged 76) New Orleans, Louisiana, U.S.
- Genres: Dixieland; jazz
- Occupations: Musician; bandleader
- Instrument: Trumpet
- Labels: Monument; RCA Victor

Alois Maxwell "Al" Hirt (November 7, 1922 – April 27, 1999) was an American trumpeter and bandleader. He is best remembered for his million-selling recordings of "Java" and the accompanying album Honey in the Horn (1963), and for the theme music to The Green Hornet. His nicknames included "Jumbo" and "The Round Mound of Sound". Colin Escott, an author of musician biographies, wrote that RCA Victor, for which Hirt had recorded most of his best-selling recordings and for which he had spent most of his professional recording career, had simply dubbed him "The King." Hirt was inducted into The Louisiana Music Hall of Fame in November 2009. He received eight Grammy nominations during his lifetime, including winning the Grammy award in 1964 for his version of "Java".

== Early life ==
Hirt was born in New Orleans, Louisiana, the son of a police officer. At the age of six, he was given his first trumpet, which had been purchased at a local pawnshop. He played in the Junior Police Band with friend Roy Fernandez, the son of Alcide Nunez.

== Career ==
By the age of 16, Hirt was playing professionally, often with his friend Pete Fountain, while attending Jesuit High School. During this time, he was hired to play at the local horse racing track, beginning a six-decade connection to the sport.

In 1940, Hirt went to Cincinnati, Ohio, to study at the Cincinnati Conservatory of Music with Dr. Frank Simon (a former soloist with the John Philip Sousa Orchestra). After a stint as a bugler in the United States Army during World War II, Hirt performed with various swing big bands, including those of Tommy Dorsey, Jimmy Dorsey, Benny Goodman, and Ina Ray Hutton.

In 1950, Hirt became first trumpet and featured soloist with Horace Heidt's Orchestra. After spending several years on the road with Heidt, Hirt returned to New Orleans working with various Dixieland groups and leading his own bands. Despite Hirt's statement years later "I'm not a jazz trumpeter and never was a jazz trumpeter", he made a few recordings where he demonstrated his ability to play in that style, during the 1950s with bandleader Monk Hazel, and a few other recordings on the local Southland Records label.

Hirt's virtuoso dexterity and fine tone on his instrument soon attracted the attention of major record labels and he signed with RCA Victor. Hirt posted twenty-two albums on the Billboard charts in the 1950s and 1960s. The albums Honey in the Horn and Cotton Candy were both in the Top 10 best sellers for 1964, the same year Hirt scored a hit single with his cover of Allen Toussaint's tune "Java" (Billboard No. 4), and later won a Grammy Award for the same recording. Both Honey in the Horn and Java sold over one million copies, and were awarded gold discs.

Hirt's Top 40 charted hit "Sugar Lips" in 1964 would be later used as the theme song for the NBC daytime game show Eye Guess, hosted by Bill Cullen and originally airing from January 1966 to September 1969.

"Green Hornet Theme"
Sample from Green Hornet Theme from album The Horn Meets "The Hornet" RCA Victor 1966

Hirt was chosen to record the frenetic theme for the 1960s TV show The Green Hornet, by famed arranger and composer Billy May. Based on Nikolai Rimsky-Korsakov's Flight of the Bumblebee from his opera The Tale of Tsar Saltan, it showcased Hirt's technical prowess. In 2003, the recording again gained public attention when it was featured in the film Kill Bill.

From the mid-1950s to early 1960s, Hirt and his band played nightly at Dan's Pier 600 at the corner of St. Louis and Bourbon Street. The nightclub was owned by his business manager, Dan Levy, Sr.

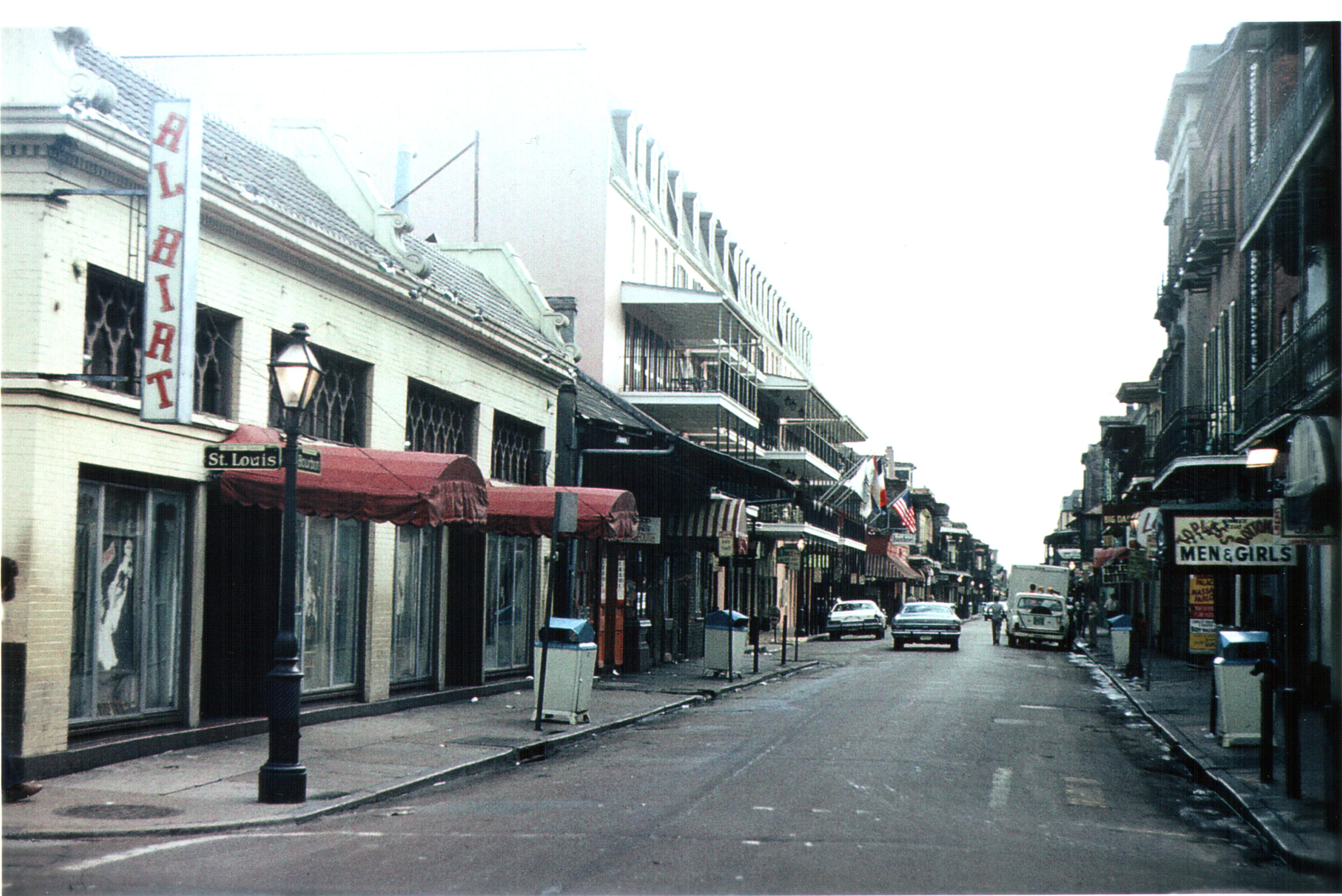
Al Hirt club on the corner of Bourbon Street and St Louis in the French Quarter, 1977

Hirt opened his own club, the Basin St. South, on Bourbon Street in the French Quarter, which existed from 1962 to 1983. He also became a minority owner in the NFL expansion New Orleans Saints in 1967.

In 1962, in an effort to showcase him in a different musical setting, Hirt was teamed with arranger and composer Billy May and RCA Victor producer Steve Sholes to record an album titled Horn a Plenty that was a departure from the Dixieland material that he was generally associated with. Covering an eclectic variety of popular, standard and show tunes, it featured a big-band supplemented by timpani, French horns and harp. He also appeared opposite Troy Donahue and Suzanne Pleshette in the 1962 motion picture, Rome Adventure.

"Memories of You"
Sample from "Memories of You" from Horn a Plenty RCA Victor 1962

In 1965, Hirt hosted the hour-long television variety series Fanfare, which aired Saturday nights on CBS as the summer replacement for Jackie Gleason and the American Scene Magazine.

Hirt starred along with Marguerite Piazza, Lionel Hampton, Doc Severinsen and the Southern University marching band at Super Bowl IV halftime show on January 11, 1970.

On February 8, 1970, while performing in a Mardi Gras parade in New Orleans, Hirt was injured while riding on a float. It was widely reported that he was struck in the mouth by a thrown brick or a piece of concrete and required 12 stitches to the underside of his upper lip. Factual documentation of the details of the incident is sparse, consisting primarily of claims made by Hirt after the incident although police reported that the 1970 Mardi Gras was one of the worst for trouble, with hundreds arrested for drunkenness and violence. Whatever the actual cause of his injuries, Hirt underwent surgery and made a return to the club scene. This incident was parodied in a Saturday Night Live skit from their second season Mardi Gras special, the "Let's Hit Al Hirt in the Mouth with a Brick Contest".

In 1987, Hirt played a solo rendition of "Ave Maria" (Note: It is unclear as to which version of "Ave Maria" this was, but the best-known ones are those by Bach/Gounod and by Schubert.) for Pope John Paul II's visit to New Orleans. He is referred to in the 1987 film Good Morning, Vietnam, in a broadcast made by Lieutenant Hauk (Bruno Kirby).

Hirt died of liver failure at the age of 76, after having spent the previous year in a wheelchair due to edema in his leg. He was survived by his wife, Beverly Essel Hirt, and eight children from a previous marriage.

== Discography ==
=== Singles ===
Year	Titles (A-side, B-side) Both sides from same album except where indicated	US Billboard	US Cashbox	US Adult Contemporary	Record Label	Album
1961	"Janine" b/w "Elegie"	–	–	–	RCA Victor 7854	Non-album tracks
1961	"I'm On My Way" b/w "Perky"	–	–	–	RCA Victor 7903	Al's Place
1962	"Al Di La" b/w "Talkin 'Bout That River"	–	–	–	RCA Victor 8016	Honey In The Horn
1962	"Theme From 'The Eleventh Hour'" b/w "Song From 'Two For The Seesaw'" (Non-album track)	–	–	–	RCA Victor 8104	Al's Place
1963	"Roman Nocturne" b/w "Pickin' Cotton" (Non-album track)	–	–	–	RCA Victor 8854	Al's Place
1964	"Java" b/w "I Can't Get Started"	4	4	1	RCA Victor 8280	Honey In The Horn
1964	"Cotton Candy" /	15	15	3	RCA Victor 8346	Cotton Candy
1964	"Walkin'"	103	134	—	RCA Victor 8346	Cotton Candy
1964	"Floatin' Down To Cotton Town" b/w "After You've Gone"	–	–	–	Coral Silver Star 65590	Floatin' Down To Cotton Town
1964	"Sugar Lips" b/w "Poupee Brisee (Broken Doll)"	30	20	3	RCA Victor 8391	Sugar Lips
1964	"Up Above My Head (I Hear Music in the Air)" b/w "September Song"	85	94	12	RCA Victor 8439	Sugar Lips
1964	"Hooray For Santa Claus" b/w "White Christmas"	–	–	–	RCA Victor 8478	Non-album tracks
1965	"Feelin' Fruggy" b/w "Louisiana Lullaby"	–	135	30	RCA Victor 8684	Non-album tracks
1965	"Fancy Pants" b/w "Star Dust"	47	37	9	RCA Victor 8487	That Honey Horn Sound
1965	"Al's Place" b/w "Mister Sandman"	57	67	13	RCA Victor 8543	Al's Place
1965	"The Silence (Il Silenzio)" b/w "Love Theme from The Sandpiper"	96	129	19	RCA Victor 8653	Non-album tracks
1965	"Nutty Jingle Bells" b/w "Santa Claus Is Comin' To Town"	–	–	–	RCA Victor 8706	The Sound Of Christmas
1966	"Mame" b/w "Seven Days To Tahiti"	–	135	36	RCA Victor 8774	Non-album tracks
1966	"Trumpet Pickin'" b/w "Skillet Lickin'"	–	129	27	RCA Victor 8854	Non-album tracks
1966	"The Arena" /	129	115	28	RCA Victor 8736	Non-album tracks
1966	"Yesterday"	-	tag	-	RCA Victor 8736	Non-album tracks
1966	"Green Hornet Theme" b/w "Strawberry Jam" (Non-album track)	126	121	–	RCA Victor 8925	The Horn Meets "The Hornet"
1966	"The Evil One" b/w "(Theme From) The Monkees" (from The Horn Meets "The Hornet")	–	–	–	RCA Victor 9023	Non-album track
1967	"Music To Watch Girls By" b/w "His Girl"	119	—	31	RCA Victor 9060	Music To Watch Girls By
1967	"Yo-Yo (Puppet Song)" b/w "Boy Watchers' Theme" (Non-album track)	–	–	–	RCA Victor 9106	Music To Watch Girls By
1967	"Puppet On A String" b/w "Big Honey"	129	—	18	RCA Victor 9198	Non-album tracks
1967	"Calypsoul" b/w "Honey Pot"	—	—	—	RCA Victor 9285	Soul In The Horn
1967	"Ludwig" b/w "Long Gone"	–	—	23	RCA Victor 9381	Soul In The Horn
1968	"Keep the Ball Rollin'" b/w "Manhattan Safari"	100	—	10	RCA Victor 9417	Al's Place
1968	"We Can Fly/Up-Up and Away" b/w "The Glory Of Love"	129	—	23	RCA Victor 9500	Non-album tracks
1968	"The Odd Couple" b/w "Do You Know the Way to San Jose"	–	–	–	RCA Victor 9539	Non-album tracks
1968	"The Garbage" b/w "Those Were the Days"	–	–	–	RCA Victor 9664	Non-album tracks
1969	"If" b/w "Penny Arcade"	116	95	16	RCA Victor 9717	Non-album tracks
1969	"Viva Max March" b/w "Don't Turn Back"; Both sides with Hugo Montenegro	–	–	–	RCA Victor 0302	Viva Max!
1969	"The Gospel Of No Name City" b/w "I Still See Elisa"	–	–	–	GWP 516	Paint Your Wagon
1970	"Break My Mind" b/w "Louisiana Man"	–	–	–	GWP 519	Al Hirt Country
1971	"Orange Blossom Special" b/w "I Really Don't Want to Know"	–	–	–	GWP 522	Al Hirt Country
1974	"Sweet Sauce" b/w "Melody For Michelle"	–	–	–	Monument 8619	Raw Sugar/Sweet Sauce/Banana Pudd'n'
1975	"Feuding Pipers" b/w "Southern Scramble"; Both sides with Boots Randolph	–	–	–	Monument 8652	Non-album tracks
1975	"Monkey Farm" b/w "The Sound Of Jazz and The Scent Of Jasmine"	–	–	–	Monument 8671	Al Hirt's Jumbo Gumbo

=== Albums ===
Year	Album	Peak chart positions		Record label
Year	Album	US 200	US Jazz	Record label
1962	Al Hirt in New Orleans	–	–	Coral
1957	Al Hirt and His New Orleans All Stars	–	–	Southland
1957	Blockbustin' Dixie!	–	–	Verve
1958	Al Hirt's Jazz Band Ball	–	–	Verve
1958	Swingin' Dixie at Dan's Pier 600 in New Orleans, Vol. 1	–	–	Audio Fidelity
1959	Swingin' Dixie at Dan's Pier 600 in New Orleans, Vol. 2	–	–	Audio Fidelity
1960	Swingin' Dixie, Vol. 3	–	–	Audio Fidelity
1961	Swingin' Dixie, Vol. 4	–	–	Audio Fidelity
1961	He's the King and His Band	61	–	RCA Victor
1961	The Greatest Horn in the World	21	–	RCA Victor
1962	At the Mardi Gras	–	–	RCA Victor
1962	Horn A-Plenty	24	–	RCA Victor
1962	Trumpet and Strings	96	–	RCA Victor
1963	Honey in the Horn	3	–	RCA Victor
1963	Our Man in New Orleans	44	–	RCA Victor
1964	Beauty and the Beard	83	–	RCA Victor
1964	"Pops" Goes the Trumpet (Holiday for Brass)	-	–	RCA Victor
1964	Sugar Lips	9	–	RCA Victor
1964	Cotton Candy	6	–	RCA Victor
1965	The Sound of Christmas	–	–	RCA Victor
1965	Live at Carnegie Hall	47	–	RCA Victor
1965	That Honey Horn Sound	28	–	RCA Victor
1965	They're Playing Our Song	39	–	RCA Victor
1966	The Happy Trumpet	125	–	RCA Victor
1966	The Horn Meets "The Hornet"	–	–	RCA Victor
1966	Latin in the Horn	–	–	RCA Victor
1967	Soul in the Horn	–	–	RCA Victor
1967	Struttin' Down Royal Street	–	–	RCA Victor
1967	Music to Watch Girls By	–	–	RCA Victor
1968	Al Hirt Plays Bert Kaempfert	116	–	RCA Victor
1968	In Love With You	–	–	RCA Victor
1968	Al Hirt Now!	–	–	RCA Victor
1968	Unforgettable	–	–	RCA Victor
1969	Here in My Heart	–	–	RCA Victor
1988	That's a Plenty	–	9	Pro-Arte
1989	Cotton Candy	–	12	Pro Jazz
1989	Jazzin' at the Pops	12	–	Pro Jazz
1991	Al's Place	–	–	Special Music
1991	Raw Sugar, Sweet Sauce	–	–	Monument
1972	Have a Merry Little Christmas	–	–	RCA Camden
1993	Bourbon Street Parade	–	–	Intersound
1996	Al Hirt & His Golden Trumpet	–	–	Total Recording
1996	Live on Bourbon Street	–	–	Laserlight
