= 1964 in music =

This is a list of notable events in music that took place in the year 1964.

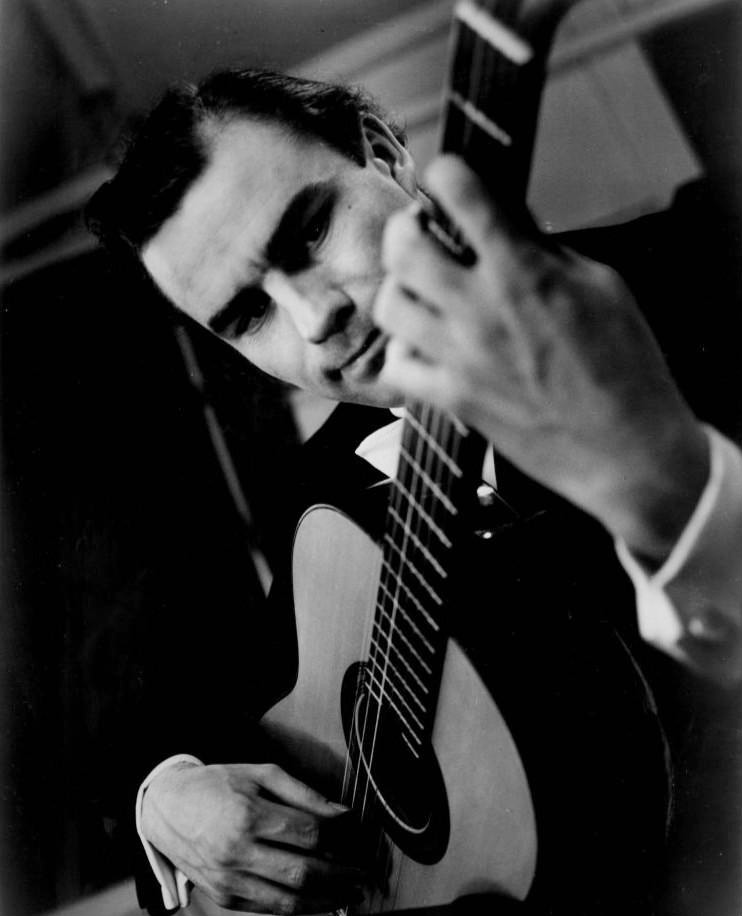
Julian Bream (1964)

== Specific locations ==
- 1964 in British music
- 1964 in Japanese music
- 1964 in Norwegian music

== Specific genres ==
- 1964 in country music
- 1964 in jazz

== Events ==
- January 1 – Top of the Pops is broadcast for the first time, on BBC television in the U.K.
- January 3 – Footage of the Beatles performing a concert in Bournemouth, England is shown on The Jack Paar Show.
- January 13 – Bob Dylan's The Times They Are a-Changin' is released on Columbia Records.
- January 15 – Vee Jay Records files a lawsuit against Capitol Records and Swan Records over manufacturing and distribution rights to Beatles albums. On April 9, Capitol Records is granted an injunction restraining Vee Jay Records from further manufacturing, distributing or advertising recordings by the Beatles.
- January 18 – The Beatles appear on the Billboard magazine charts for the first time.

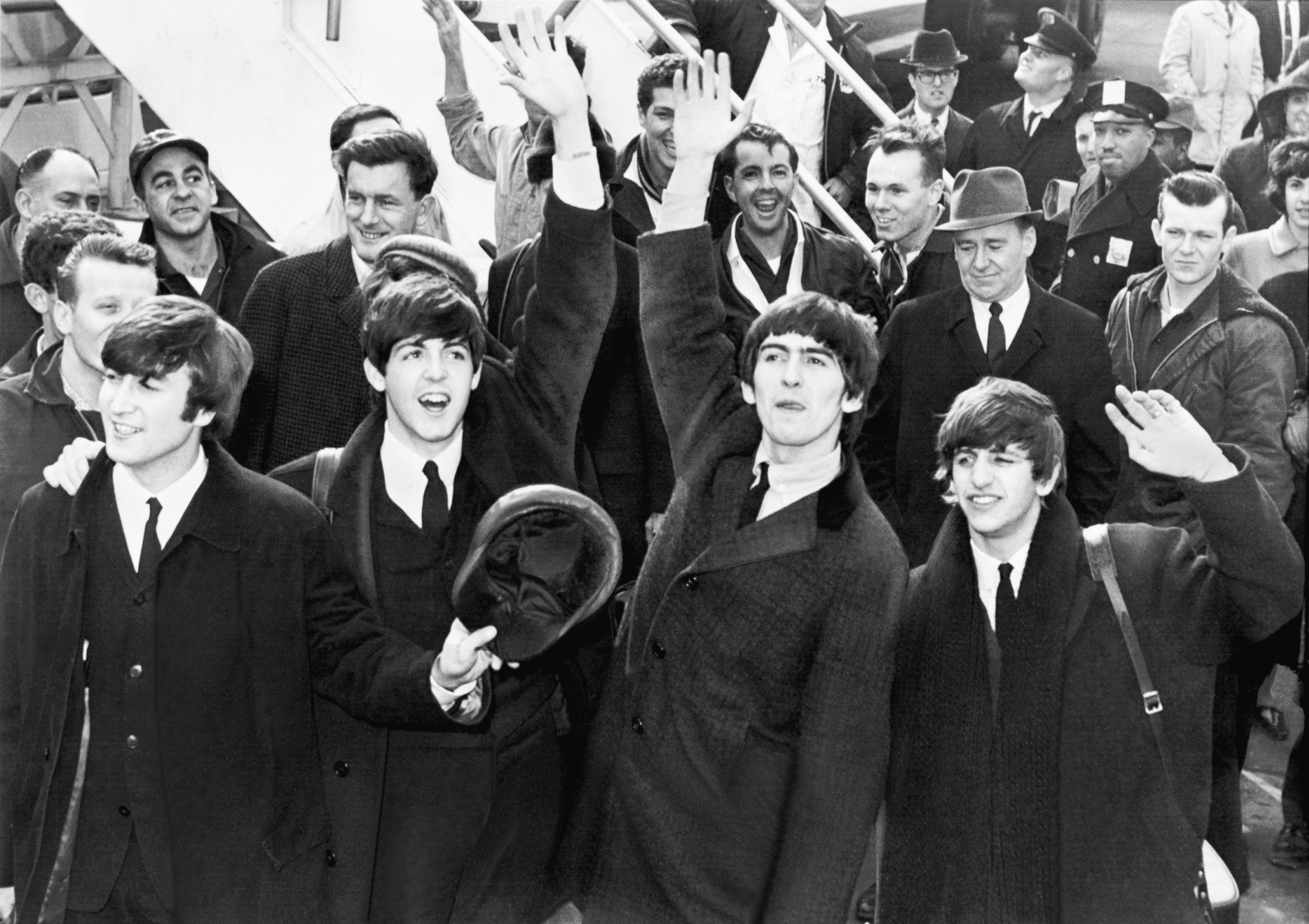
The Beatles arrive in the U.S. to great acclaim

- January 25 – The late John F. Kennedy becomes the first President credited with a Top 10 album after Dickie Goodman released John F. Kennedy: The Presidential Years 1960–1963. The following week a second album, credited to the late President, would also hit the Top 10 giving Kennedy two posthumous albums simultaneously in the Top 10.
- February 1 – Indiana Governor Matthew E. Welsh declares the song "Louie Louie" by The Kingsmen pornographic. He requests that the Indiana Broadcasters Association ban the record. Governor Welsh claimed that hearing the song made his "ears tingle". Publisher Max Firetag offers $1,000 to anyone that can find anything "suggestive" in the song's lyrics.
- February 7 – The Beatles arrive in the United States and are greeted by thousands of screaming fans at New York's Kennedy Airport.
- February 9 – The Beatles perform on The Ed Sullivan Show, which breaks television ratings records.
- February 12 – Anna Moffo collapses onstage at Covent Garden in the first act of Rigoletto, and her part is taken over, after a delay of 45 minutes, by Welsh soprano Elizabeth Vaughan.
- February 16 – The Beatles appear on The Ed Sullivan Show.
- February 22 – Plácido Domingo makes his international breakthrough at the première of Ginastera's Don Rodrigo in New York City.
- February 23
  - The Beatles appear on The Ed Sullivan Show.
  - João Carlos Martins suddenly breaks off a performance in the middle of the second movement of Beethoven's Third Piano Concerto with the City of Birmingham Symphony Orchestra at Birmingham Town Hall due to an attack of appendicitis.
- March 1
  - Capitol Records is bombarded with requests for heavyweight boxing champion Cassius Clay's album, I Am the Greatest, following Clay's defeat of Sonny Liston on February 25 and his announcement two days later that he had converted to Islam. (On March 6 would come the announcement that he would adopt the name Muhammad Ali.)
  - American premiere of Karlheinz Stockhausen's Momente, by Martina Arroyo (soprano), the Crane Collegiate Singers of SUNY Potsdam (Brock McElheran, chorus master), and members of the Buffalo Philharmonic Orchestra (Lukas Foss, music director), conducted by the composer, in Kleinhans Music Hall in Buffalo, New York.
- March 6 – Elvis Presley's 14th motion picture, Kissin' Cousins is released to theaters.
- March 14 – Billboard Magazine reports that sales of Beatles records make up 60% of the entire singles market.
- March 16 – Disc jockey Alan Freed is charged with tax evasion.
- March 21 – Italy wins the 9th Eurovision Song Contest, held in the Tivoli Concert Hall, Copenhagen, with the song "Non ho l'età", sung by 16-year-old Gigliola Cinquetti.
- March 24 – John Lennon's first book, In His Own Write is published.
- March 27 – The Beatles occupy the top six spots on the Australian pop chart.
- March 28 – Wax likenesses of The Beatles are put on display in London's Madame Tussauds Wax Museum. The Beatles are the first pop stars to be displayed at the museum.
- April – Drummer Keith Moon joins The Who.
- April 4 – The Beatles occupy all five top positions on Billboard's Hot 100 with their singles "Can't Buy Me Love", "Twist and Shout", "She Loves You", "I Want to Hold Your Hand", and "Please Please Me".
- April 11 – The Beatles hold 14 positions on the Billboard Hot 100 chart. Previously, the highest number of concurrent singles by one artist on the Hot 100 was nine by Elvis Presley, December 19, 1956.
- April 16 – The Rolling Stones release their eponymous début album.
- May 2 – In the United States, The Beatles' Second Album climbs to the #1 spot on the LP charts in only its second week of release.
- May 20 – Judy Garland makes headlines after a disastrous concert in Melbourne, Australia
- June
  - During a performance at the Railway, Pete Townshend of The Who accidentally breaks the head of his guitar on the low ceiling above the stage. This incident marks the start of auto-destructive art by destroying guitars and drums on stage.
  - Marianne Faithfull's singing career begins with the release of her single "As Tears Go By" written by members of The Rolling Stones.
- June 5 – The Rolling Stones start their first U.S. tour.
- July 3 – With their new manager Peter Meaden, The Who release their first single "Zoot Suit"/"I'm the Face" under the name The High Numbers in an attempt to appeal to a mod audience. It fails to reach the top 50 and the band reverts to calling themselves The Who.
- July 6 – The Beatles' first film, A Hard Day's Night, is released.
- July 10
  - The album of A Hard Day's Night is released in the U.K. All tracks are written by Lennon and McCartney.
  - More than 300 people are injured in Liverpool when a crowd of some 150,000 people welcome The Beatles back to their home city.
- August 2 – The wreckage of the plane piloted by Jim Reeves is found near Brentwood, Tennessee, 42 hours after it crashed. There are no survivors.
- August 8 – Bob Dylan releases his fourth album, Another Side of Bob Dylan.
- August 17 – Indiana University Opera Theater presents Turandot at the New York World's Fair featuring newly retired Metropolitan Opera soprano Margaret Harshaw, a member of the voice faculty, in the title role.
- August 19 – The Beatles start their second visit to, and first nationwide tour of, the United States with a concert at the Cow Palace in Daly City, California, before more than 17,000 fans.
- August 22 – The Supremes reach #1 on the Billboard Hot 100 chart with the first of five successive number one hits, "Where Did Our Love Go".
- August 26 – The Kinks release their iconic single "You Really Got Me".
- September 8 – The American premiere of Karlheinz Stockhausen's Originale at Judson Hall in New York City is picketed by a group calling themselves Action Against Cultural Imperialism.
- September 16 – Shindig! premieres on ABC.
- September 21 – The China Conservatory of Music is established in Beijing.
- September 22 – Fiddler on the Roof opens on Broadway.
- October – Dr. Robert Moog demonstrates his prototype synthesizers.
- October 19 – Simon & Garfunkel release their debut album, Wednesday Morning, 3 A.M., their first for Columbia Records, which is a total flop at this time. After release of their second album, Sounds of Silence, in 1966, it hits #30 on the Billboard charts.
- October 24 – The Rolling Stones start their second US tour.
- October 25 – The Rolling Stones perform on The Ed Sullivan Show for the first time.
- October 29 – The T.A.M.I. Show is filmed.
- October 31 – The Supremes reach #1 on the Billboard Hot 100 chart with the second of five successive number one hits, "Baby Love".
- November – A deal with U.K. impresario W. H. Miller lands the Anita Kerr Quartette on Capitol Records for North America.
- December 11 – Sam Cooke is killed under mysterious circumstances in Los Angeles, California. Shortly thereafter, "A Change Is Gonna Come", a song considered by many to be his best, is released.
- December 19 – The Supremes reach #1 on the Billboard Hot 100 chart with the third of five successive number one hits, "Come See About Me".
- December 24 – The Beatles gain the Christmas number one in the United Kingdom for the second year running with I Feel Fine, which has topped the singles charts for the third week running. The Beatles have now had six number ones in the U.K. alone.
- date unknown
  - Dalida is the first star to receive a Platinum Disc in Europe.
  - 11-year-old Keith Green becomes the youngest person ever to sign a contract with the American Society of Composers, Authors and Publishers (ASCAP) after publishing, recording and releasing the song "The Way I Used to Be".
  - The National Institute of Kathak Dance is established in New Delhi.
  - Sonny and Cher begin performing together as "Caesar and Cleo".

== Bands formed ==
- See Category:Musical groups established in 1964

== Albums released ==
=== January ===
| Day | Album | Artist | Notes |
|---|---|---|---|
| 1 | Before I'm Over You | Loretta Lynn | - |
| 1 | The Hits of Jo Stafford | Jo Stafford | - |
| 9 | Live at Birdland | John Coltrane | - |
| 10 | The Rolling Stones | The Rolling Stones | - |
| 13 | The Times They Are a-Changin' | Bob Dylan | - |
| 20 | Meet the Beatles! | The Beatles | US |
| - | Folk Singer | Muddy Waters | - |
| - | A Lettermen Kind of Love | The Lettermen | - |
| - | Living a Lie | Al Martino | - |
| - | Stay with The Hollies | The Hollies | Debut |

=== February ===
| Day | Album | Artist | Notes |
|---|---|---|---|
| 7 | Born to Wander | The Four Seasons | - |
| 18 | Unforgettable: A Tribute to Dinah Washington | Aretha Franklin | - |
| - | Anyone Who Had a Heart | Dionne Warwick | - |
| - | The Many Moods of Tony | Tony Bennett | - |
| - | Pure Dynamite! Live at the Royal | James Brown | Live |
| - | The Third Album | Barbra Streisand | - |
| - | Tom Jones | John Addison | Soundtrack to 1963 film |

=== March ===
| Day | Album | Artist | Notes |
|---|---|---|---|
| 1 | Ain't That Good News | Sam Cooke | - |
| 2 | Shut Down Volume 2 | The Beach Boys | - |
| 20 | Meet The Temptations | The Temptations | - |
| - | The Astounding 12-String Guitar of Glen Campbell | Glen Campbell | - |
| - | Dawn (Go Away) and 11 Other Great Songs | The Four Seasons | - |
| - | Getz/Gilberto | Stan Getz and João Gilberto | - |
| - | Glad All Over | The Dave Clark Five | - |
| - | The Italian Voice of Al Martino | Al Martino | - |
| - | Who's Afraid of Virginia Woolf? | Jimmy Smith | - |

=== April ===
| Day | Album | Artist | Notes |
|---|---|---|---|
| 1 | When I'm Alone I Cry | Marvin Gaye | - |
| 2 | Kissin' Cousins | Elvis Presley | Soundtrack |
| 10 | The Beatles' Second Album | The Beatles | US |
| 10 | A Session with The Dave Clark Five | The Dave Clark Five | UK |
| 15 | Together | Marvin Gaye and Mary Wells | - |
| 16 | The Rolling Stones | The Rolling Stones | - |
| 17 | A Girl Called Dusty | Dusty Springfield | - |
| 20 | The Believer | John Coltrane | - |
| 20 | When Lights Are Low | Tony Bennett | - |
| - | America, I Hear You Singing | Frank Sinatra with Bing Crosby and Fred Waring | - |
| - | Black Orchid | The Three Sounds | - |
| - | Funny Girl | Barbra Streisand | Original Broadway Cast |
| - | Manhattan Tower / The Man Who Loves Manhattan | Robert Goulet | - |

=== May ===
| Day | Album | Artist | Notes |
|---|---|---|---|
| 11 | The Beatles' Long Tall Sally | The Beatles | Canada |
| 18 | By Request | Brenda Lee | - |
| 22 | The Dave Clark Five Return! | The Dave Clark Five | US |
| 22 | It's the Searchers | The Searchers | UK |
| 29 | England's Newest Hit Makers | The Rolling Stones | US |
| - | Bewitched | Jack Jones | - |
| - | Dance with The Shadows | The Shadows | - |
| - | Hello, Dolly! | Louis Armstrong | - |
| - | The Lettermen Look at Love | The Lettermen | - |
| - | Mary Wells Sings My Guy | Mary Wells | - |
| - | Stay & Other Great Hits | The Four Seasons | - |
| - | Viva Las Vegas | Elvis Presley | Soundtrack EP |

=== June ===
| Day | Album | Artist | Notes |
|---|---|---|---|
| 19 | Long Tall Sally | The Beatles | EP |
| 22 | I Walk the Line | Johnny Cash | - |
| - | Back in Town | The Kingston Trio | Live |
| - | Don't Let the Sun Catch You Crying | Gerry & the Pacemakers | US |
| - | The Fabulous Ventures | The Ventures | - |
| - | I Love You More and More Every Day/Tears and Roses | Al Martino | - |
| - | Robin and the 7 Hoods | Frank Sinatra, Dean Martin, Bing Crosby and Sammy Davis, Jr. | Soundtrack |
| - | Stay Awhile/I Only Want to Be with You | Dusty Springfield | - |
| - | Thanks a Lot | Ernest Tubb | - |
| - | A World Without Love | Peter and Gordon | - |

=== July ===
| Day | Album | Artist | Notes |
|---|---|---|---|
| 1 | More of Roy Orbison's Greatest Hits | Roy Orbison | Compilation |
| 10 | A Hard Day's Night | The Beatles | Soundtrack |
| 13 | All Summer Long | The Beach Boys | - |
| 13 | I Don't Want to Be Hurt Anymore | Nat King Cole | - |
| 20 | American Tour | The Dave Clark Five | US |
| - | The Body & the Soul | Freddie Hubbard | - |
| - | Hello, Dolly! | Ella Fitzgerald | - |
| - | The Judy Collins Concert | Judy Collins | Live |
| - | Keep on Pushing | The Impressions | - |
| - | Looking For Love | Connie Francis | - |
| - | Rag Doll | The Four Seasons | - |
| - | Wonderful Life | Cliff Richard and The Shadows | Soundtrack |

=== August ===
| Day | Album | Artist | Notes |
|---|---|---|---|
| 8 | Another Side of Bob Dylan | Bob Dylan | - |
| 14 | Five by Five | The Rolling Stones | EP |
| 31 | Make Way for Dionne Warwick | Dionne Warwick | - |
| 31 | Where Did Our Love Go | The Supremes | - |
| - | Black Pearls | John Coltrane | - |
| - | Dream With Dean | Dean Martin | - |
| - | It Might as Well Be Swing | Frank Sinatra with Count Basie | - |
| - | It's the Searchers | The Searchers | Released in the US as This Is Us |
| - | Two Great Guitars | Bo Diddley and Chuck Berry | - |
| - | Walk, Don't Run, Vol. 2 | The Ventures | - |
| - | Where Love Has Gone | Jack Jones | - |

=== September ===
| Day | Album | Artist | Notes |
|---|---|---|---|
| 11 | The Five Faces of Manfred Mann | Manfred Mann | - |
| 14 | The Doris Day Christmas Album | Doris Day | Christmas |
| - | The Animals | The Animals | US version |
| - | The Cat | Jimmy Smith | - |
| - | In the Name of Love | Peggy Lee | - |
| - | People | Barbra Streisand | - |
| - | Mary Poppins | Irwin Kostal, Julie Andrews | Original Cast Soundtrack |
| - | Without You | Robert Goulet | - |

=== October ===
| Day | Album | Artist | Notes |
|---|---|---|---|
| 1 | Bitter Tears: Ballads of the American Indian | Johnny Cash | - |
| 1 | Early Orbison | Roy Orbison | Compilation |
| 2 | Kinks | The Kinks | - |
| 16 | A Bit of Liverpool | The Supremes | British Invasion tribute LP |
| 17 | 12 X 5 | The Rolling Stones | - |
| 19 | Beach Boys Concert | The Beach Boys | Live |
| 19 | Wednesday Morning, 3 A.M. | Simon & Garfunkel | - |
| 19 | With a Smile and a Song | Doris Day | - |
| 20 | Roustabout | Elvis Presley | Soundtrack |
| - | The Animals | The Animals | UK version |
| - | The Door Is Still Open to My Heart | Dean Martin | - |
| - | Dusty | Dusty Springfield | US |
| - | Gerry & the Pacemakers Second Album | Gerry & the Pacemakers | US |
| - | Joan Baez/5 | Joan Baez | - |
| - | Oscar Peterson Trio + One | The Oscar Peterson trio with Clark Terry | - |

=== November ===
| Day | Album | Artist | Notes |
|---|---|---|---|
| 9 | The Beach Boys' Christmas Album | The Beach Boys | Christmas |
| 12 | Hello Broadway | Marvin Gaye | - |
| 16 | Who Can I Turn To | Tony Bennett | - |
| 23 | The Beatles' Story | The Beatles | US |
| - | 12 Songs of Christmas | Bing Crosby with Frank Sinatra | Christmas |
| - | Blue Jeans a'Swinging | Swinging Blue Jeans | - |
| - | In The Hollies Style | The Hollies | - |
| - | The Jack Jones Christmas Album | Jack Jones | Christmas |
| - | A Merry Christmas | Al Martino | Christmas |
| - | A New Kind of Connie... | Connie Francis | - |
| - | St. Louis to Liverpool | Chuck Berry | - |
| - | Softly, as I Leave You | Frank Sinatra | - |

=== December ===
| Day | Album | Artist | Notes |
|---|---|---|---|
| 4 | Beatles for Sale | The Beatles | - |
| 4 | Five Live Yardbirds | The Yardbirds | Live |
| 7 | The Kingston Trio (Nick Bob John) | The Kingston Trio | - |
| 15 | Beatles '65 | The Beatles | US |
| 21 | Autobiography | Nat Adderley | - |
| - | Coast to Coast | The Dave Clark Five | US |
| - | My Love Forgive Me | Robert Goulet | - |
| - | Verlaine et Rimbaud | Léo Ferré | France |

=== Release date unknown ===
- 442 Glenwood Avenue – The Pixies Three
- The Academy Award–Winning "Call Me Irresponsible" and Other Hit Songs from the Movies – Andy Williams
- Allan in Wonderland – Allan Sherman
- Alexandria the Great – Lorez Alexandria
- Amore Scusami – Dalida
- Ballads, Blues and Boasters – Harry Belafonte
- Basie Land – Count Basie
- Beauty and the Beard – Al Hirt
- Bebop Revisited! – Charles McPherson
- Black Fire – Andrew Hill
- Blue Gene – Gene Pitney
- Blue Spoon – Jimmy Witherspoon
- Blue Around the Clock – Jimmy Witherspoon
- Bo Diddley's 16 All-Time Greatest Hits – Bo Diddley
- Bread & Butter – The Newbeats
- Brown Sugar – Freddie Roach
- Christmas Cookin' – Jimmy Smith
- Coltrane's Sound – John Coltrane
- Cotton Candy – Al Hirt
- Crescent – John Coltrane
- Cuddlebug – The Simon Sisters
- The Dealers – John Coltrane & Mal Waldron
- Donna The Prima Donna – Dion DiMucci
- The Door Is Still Open to My Heart – Dean Martin
- The Dubliners – The Dubliners (debut)
- Ella at Juan-Les-Pins – Ella Fitzgerald
- Ella Fitzgerald Sings the Johnny Mercer Song Book – Ella Fitzgerald
- Etta James Rocks the House – Etta James
- The Exciting Voice of Sergio Franchi – Sergio Franchi
- Expressions East – John Berberian
- Fiddler on the Roof – Original soundtrack
- For Swingin' Livers Only! – Allan Sherman
- The Great Songs from "My Fair Lady" and Other Broadway Hits – Andy Williams
- The Great Years – Johnny Mathis
- Here I Go Again – The Hollies (US)
- Hey, Brother, Pour the Wine – Dean Martin
- Hide and Seekers – The Seekers
- How My Heart Sings! – Bill Evans
- I'll Search My Heart and Other Great Hits – Johnny Mathis
- Indifferentemente – Mario Trevi
- In Europe – Miles Davis
- In Love Again! – Peggy Lee
- In Person at the Americana – Julie London
- It Hurts to Be in Love – Gene Pitney
- It's Monk's Time – Thelonious Monk
- Johnny Horton's Greatest Hits – Johnny Horton
- Joyful Season – Jo Stafford
- Love After Midnight – Patti Page
- The Manfred Mann Album – Manfred Mann
- Meet The Simon Sisters – The Simon Sisters
- My Fair Lady – Original soundtrack
- The Never Ending Impressions – The Impressions
- Out to Lunch! – Eric Dolphy
- Quincy Jones Explores the Music of Henry Mancini – Quincy Jones
- Right or Wrong – Ronnie Dove
- Rock Around the Clock King – Bill Haley & His Comets
- Runnin' Out of Fools – Aretha Franklin
- Said I To Shostakovitch – Tupper Saussy
- Sammy Davis Jr. Salutes the Stars of the London Palladium – Sammy Davis, Jr.
- The Seekers – The Seekers
- The Shelter of Your Arms – Sammy Davis, Jr.
- Sinatra Sings Days of Wine and Roses, Moon River, and Other Academy Award Winners – Frank Sinatra
- Só Danço Samba – Clare Fischer
- Stevie at the Beach – Stevie Wonder
- Sugar Lips – Al Hirt
- Surf Surf Surf – Bill Haley & His Comets
- The Swinger's Guide to Mary Poppins – The Tupper Saussy Quartet with Charlie McCoy
- Tears for Dolphy – Ted Curson
- Tender Is the Night – Johnny Mathis
- This Is Love – Johnny Mathis
- Today, Tomorrow, Forever – Nancy Wilson
- The Ventures in Space – The Ventures
- We Get Requests – The Oscar Peterson trio
- Women in My Life – Sergio Franchi
- The Wonderful World of Andy Williams – Andy Williams
- The Wonderful World of Make Believe – Johnny Mathis

== Biggest hit singles ==
The following singles achieved the highest chart positions in 1964.

| # | Artist | Title | Year | Country | Chart Entries |
|---|---|---|---|---|---|
| 1 | The Beatles | I Want to Hold Your Hand | 1964 | (United Kingdom) | UK 1 – Dec 1963, US BB 1 – Jan 1964, US CashBox 1 of 1964, Canada 1 – Jan 1964, Norway 1 – Jan 1964, Germany 1 – Feb 1964, Australia 1 for 5 weeks Jul 1963, Australia 2 of 1963, RYM 2 of 1964, DDD 4 of 1963, South Africa 6 of 1963, US BB 7 of 1964, Global 7 (10 M sold) – 1963, POP 7 of 1964, Rolling Stone 16, RIAA 28, Scrobulate 29 of oldies, Acclaimed 30, Germany 40 of the 1960s, WXPN 350 |
| 2 | Roy Orbison | Oh, Pretty Woman | 1964 | (United States) | UK 1 – Sep 1964, US BB 1 – Sep 1964, Canada 1 – Aug 1964, Norway 1 – Oct 1964, Germany 1 – Jan 1965, Éire 1 – Oct 1964, Netherlands 3 – Jan 1965, US CashBox 4 of 1964, DDD 8 of 1964, RYM 13 of 1964, South Africa 15 of 1964, 16 in 2FM list, US BB 17 of 1964, POP 17 of 1964, Australia 20 of 1964, RIAA 43, OzNet 62, Germany 64 of the 1960s, Acclaimed 77, Europe 83 of the 1960s, Party 147 of 2007, Rolling Stone 222, Belgium 234 of all time, WXPN 655 |
| 3 | The Animals | House of the Rising Sun | 1964 | (United Kingdom) | UK 1 – Jun 1964, US BB 1 – Aug 1964, Canada 1 – Aug 1964, Australia 1 for 5 weeks Apr 1964, France 4 – Oct 1972, DDD 4 of 1964, RYM 5 of 1964, Netherlands 3 1964, Poland 6 – Oct 1982, Europe 7 of the 1960s, Germany 9 – Jan 1965, US BB 38 of 1964, POP 38 of 1964, US CashBox 53 of 1964, Acclaimed 55, Italy 66 of 1965, Scrobulate 80 of oldies, 89 in 2FM list, Rolling Stone 122, Belgium 124 of all time, TheQ 227, RIAA 240, OzNet 275, Germany 296 of the 1960s |
| 4 | The Beatles | A Hard Day's Night | 1964 | (United Kingdom) | UK 1 – Jul 1964, US BB 1 – Jul 1964, Canada 1 – Jul 1964, Norway 1 – Aug 1964, Éire 1 – Aug 1964, Australia 1 for 4 weeks Mar 1964, Germany 2 – Sep 1964, Australia 3 of 1964, RYM 6 of 1964, DDD 11 of 1964, South Africa 14 of 1964, US CashBox 18 of 1964, Scrobulate 39 of oldies, Europe 96 of the 1960s, Rolling Stone 153, Germany 254 of the 1960s, Acclaimed 411, OzNet 815 |
| 5 | The Beatles | I Feel Fine | 1964 | (United Kingdom) | UK 1 – Dec 1964, US BB 1 – Dec 1964, Canada 1 – Nov 1964, Netherlands 1 – Jan 1965, Norway 1 – Dec 1964, Éire 1 – Dec 1964, Australia 1 for 6 weeks Jul 1964, Germany 3 – Jan 1965, Australia 8 of 1964, RYM 8 of 1964, DDD 9 of 1964, US CashBox 19 of 1965, Scrobulate 40 of oldies, Germany 207 of the 1960s |

== Other significant singles ==
- "All Cried Out"- Dusty Springfield
- "All Day and All of the Night" – The Kinks
- "Almost There" – Andy Williams
- "Alone with You" – Brenda Lee
- "Anyone Who Had a Heart" – Cilla Black
- "As Tears Go By" – Marianne Faithfull
- "Baby I Need Your Loving" – The Four Tops
- "Baby Let Me Take You Home" – The Animals
- "Baby Love" – The Supremes
- "Baby, Please Don't Go" – Them
- "Because" – The Dave Clark Five
- "Bread and Butter" – The Newbeats
- "Can't Buy Me Love" – The Beatles
- "Chapel of Love" – The Dixie Cups
- "C'mon and Swim" – Bobby Freeman
- "Come See About Me" – The Supremes
- "Cotton Candy" – Al Hirt
- "Constantly" – Cliff Richard
- "Dancing In The Street" – Martha and The Vandellas
- "Dear Heart" – Andy Williams
- "Do Wah Diddy Diddy" – Manfred Mann
- "Do You Want to Know a Secret" – The Beatles
- "Dream Baby"- Cher
- "Everything's Alright" – The Newbeats
- "Ferry Cross the Mersey" – Gerry & the Pacemakers
- "Fever" – Helen Shapiro
- "A Fool Never Learns" – Andy Williams
- "Gator Tails And Monkey Ribs" – The Spats
- "Genie With the Light Brown Lamp" – The Shadows
- "Girl Don't Come" – Sandie Shaw
- "Give Him a Great Big Kiss" – The Shangri-Las
- "Gloria" – Them
- "Goldfinger" – Shirley Bassey
- "Happiness" – Ken Dodd
- "Hello, Dolly! – Louis Armstrong
- "Hello Muddah, Hello Fadduh (A Letter from Camp) (1964 Version)" – Allan Sherman
- "Hey Now"- Lesley Gore
- "I Could Easily Fall (In Love With You)" – Cliff Richard and The Shadows
- "I Don't Wanna Be a Loser" – Lesley Gore
- "I Get Around" – The Beach Boys
- "I Just Don't Know What To Do With Myself" – Dusty Springfield
- "I Love You More and More Every Day" – Al Martino
- "I Never Dreamed"- The Cookies
- "I Understand" – Freddie & the Dreamers
- "I'm Crying" – The Animals
- "I'm Into Something Good" – Herman's Hermits
- "I'm the Lonely One" – Cliff Richard and The Shadows
- "It's All Over Now" – The Rolling Stones
- "It's for You" – Cilla Black
- "Java" – Al Hirt
- "Just One Look" – The Hollies
- "Komm, Gib Mir Deine Hand / Sie Liebt Dich" – The Beatles
- "Leader of the Pack" – The Shangri-las
- "Let's Lock the Door (And Throw Away the Key)" – Jay and the Americans
- "Little Children" – Billy J. Kramer and The Dakotas
- "A Little Loving" – The Fourmost
- "Little Old Lady from Pasadena" – Jan and Dean
- "Little Red Rooster" – The Rolling Stones
- "Losing You" – Dusty Springfield
- "Maybe I Know" – Lesley Gore
- "A Message To Martha" – Adam Faith
- "My Boy Lollipop" – Millie
- "My Guy" – Mary Wells
- "Needle In A Haystack"- The Velvelettes
- "Non Ho L'Età (Per Amarti)" – Gigliola Cinquetti
- "One Way Love" – Cliff Bennett and the Rebel Rousers
- "On the Beach" – Cliff Richard and The Shadows
- "On the Street Where You Live" – Andy Williams
- "Popsicles and Icicles" – The Murmaids
- "Rag Doll" – The Four Seasons
- "Remember (Walking in the Sand)" – The Shangri-las
- "Rhythm and Greens" – The Shadows
- "Right or Wrong" — Ronnie Dove
- "Ringo" – Lorne Greene
- "The Rise and Fall of Flingle Bunt" – The Shadows
- "Sha-La-La" – The Shirelles
- "Share Your Love with Me" – Bobby Bland
- "She's Not There" – The Zombies
- "Shout" – Lulu & The Luvvers
- "Show Me Girl" – Herman's Hermits
- "Stay Awhile" - Dusty Springfield
- "Sugar Lips" – Al Hirt
- "Suspicion" – Terry Stafford
- "T'ain't Nothin' To Me" – The Coasters
- "Terry" – Twinkle
- "Theme for Young Lovers" – The Shadows
- "(There's) Always Something There To Remind Me" – Sandie Shaw
- "Twist and Shout" – The Beatles
- "(They Call Her) La Bamba" – The Crickets
- "There's a Place" – The Beatles
- "Think" – Brenda Lee
- "Thou Shalt Not Steal" – Dick and Dee Dee
- "Tobacco Road" – The Nashville Teens
- "The Twelfth of Never" – Cliff Richard
- "Up Above My Head (I Hear Music in the Air)" – Al Hirt
- "Walk Away" – Matt Monro
- "Walking in the Rain" – The Ronettes
- "The Way You Do The Things You Do" -The Temptations
- "We Love You Beatles" – The Carefrees
- "We'll Sing in the Sunshine"- Gale Garnett
- "The Wedding" – Julie Rogers
- "When Joanna Loved Me" – Tony Bennett
- "When You Loved Me" – Brenda Lee
- "Where Did Our Love Go?" – The Supremes
- "The World of Lonely People" – Anita Bryant
- "A World Without Love" – Peter & Gordon
- "Wrong for Each Other" – Andy Williams
- "You're My World" – Cilla Black
- "You're No Good" – The Swinging Blue Jeans
- "You Really Got Me" – The Kinks
- "Zoot Suit" – The Who

== Published popular music ==
- "The Addams Family theme song" w.m. Vic Mizzy
- "Baby, I Need Your Loving w.m. Edward Holland, Brian Holland & Lamont Dozier
- "The Ballad of Gilligan's Island" w.m. Frank DeVol and Sherwood Schwartz
- "Before the Parade Passes By" w.m. Jerry Herman, from the musical Hello, Dolly!
- "Bewitched theme song" w.m. Howard Greenfield and Jack Keller
- "Chapel Of Love" w.m. Phil Spector, Ellie Greenwich & Jeff Barry
- "Chim Chim Cher-ee" w.m. Richard M. Sherman and Robert B. Sherman
- "Cryin' Time" w.m. Buck Owens
- "Dear Heart" w. Jay Livingston & Ray Evans m. Henry Mancini
- "Feed the Birds" w.m. Richard M. Sherman & Robert B. Sherman from the film Mary Poppins
- "Gimme Some" w. Lee Adams m. Charles Strouse
- "Glad All Over" w.m. Dave Clark & Mike Smith
- "Goin' Out of My Head" w.m. Teddy Randazzo & Bobby Weinstein
- "Golden Boy" w. Lee Adams m. Charles Strouse
- "Hang on Sloopy" w.m. Bert Russell & Wes Farrell
- "Have I the Right?" w.m. Ken Howard & Alan Blaikley
- "Hush, Hush Sweet Charlotte", m. Frank DeVol from the film of the same name
- "I Will Wait For You" m. Michel Legrand. From the film musical The Umbrellas of Cherbourg
- "If I Were a Rich Man" w. Sheldon Harnick m. Jerry Bock. Introduced in the musical Fiddler on the Roof by Zero Mostel. Performed by Chaim Topol in the 1971 film version.
- "Invisible Tears" w.m. Ned Miller and Sue Miller
- "It's Over" w.m. Roy Orbison & Bill Dees
- "Let's Go Fly a Kite" w.m. Richard M. Sherman & Robert B. Sherman from the film Mary Poppins
- "Oh, Pretty Woman" w.m. Roy Orbison & Bill Dees
- "Pass Me By" w. Carolyn Leigh m. Cy Coleman. Introduced by Digby Wolfe in the film Father Goose
- "Put On Your Sunday Clothes" w.m. Jerry Herman, from the musical Hello, Dolly!
- "Sister Suffragette" w.m. Richard M. Sherman & Robert B. Sherman. Introduced by Glynis Johns in the film Mary Poppins.
- "So Long, Dearie" w.m. Jerry Herman, from the musical Hello, Dolly!
- "A Spoonful of Sugar" w.m. Richard M. Sherman & Robert B. Sherman from the film Mary Poppins
- "Style" w. Sammy Cahn m. Jimmy Van Heusen from the film Robin And The Seven Hoods
- "Sunrise, Sunset" w. Sheldon Harnick m. Jerry Bock
- "Supercalifragilisticexpialidocious" w.m. Richard M. Sherman & Robert B. Sherman from the film Mary Poppins
- "That's Life" w.m. Dean Kay & Kelly Gordon
- "Tradition" w. Sheldon Harnick m. Jerry Bock
- "Where Did Our Love Go?" w.m. Lamont Dozier, Brian Holland and Edward Holland
- "A World Without Love" w.m. John Lennon and Paul McCartney
- "Zorbas" (Zorba's Dance) m. Mikis Theodorakis

== Other notable songs ==
- "Dahil Sa Iyo" w.m. Tom Spinosa and Mike Velarde, Jr.
- "I miei pensieri" w. Sanzio Chiesa m. Giovanni Pelli
- "Laisse tomber les filles" w.m. Serge Gainsbourg
- "L'Orange" w.m. Gilbert Bécaud and Pierre Delanoë
- "Mon Pays" w.m. Gilles Vigneault
- "There's a Great Big Beautiful Tomorrow" w.m. Robert B. Sherman and Richard M. Sherman (for Walt Disney's Carousel of Progress)
- "It's A Small World (After All)" w.m. Robert B. Sherman and Richard M. Sherman
- "Que C'est Triste Venise" w.m. Françoise Dorin

== Classical music ==
=== Premieres ===
Sortable table
| Composer | Composition | Date | Location | Performers |
|---|---|---|---|---|
| Badings, Henk | Symphony No. 12 | 1964-10-20 | (Netherlands) Scheveningen (Kurhaus) | Residentie Orchestra, Willem van Otterloo |
| Birtwistle, Harrison | Entr'actes and Sappho Fragments | 1964-07-12 | (United Kingdom) Cheltenham (Festival) | Thomas / Virtuoso Ensemble, Carewe |
| Birtwistle, Harrison | Three Movements with Fanfares | 1964-07-08 | (United Kingdom) London (Guildhall) | English Chamber Orchestra, Pritchard |
| Davies, Peter Maxwell | Veni sancte spiritus | 1964-07-10 | (United Kingdom) Cheltenham (Festival | Princeton High School Choir, [orchestra unknown], Hilbish |
| Hoddinott, Alun | Harp Sonata | 1964-07-12 | (United Kingdom) Cheltenham (Festival) | Ellis |
| Maderna, Bruno | Dimensioni IV for chamber ensemble | 1964-07-23 | (West Germany) Darmstadt (Ferienkurse) | Internationales Kammerensemble Darmstadt – Maderna |
| Rawsthorne, Alan | Symphony No. 3 | 1964-07-08 | (United Kingdom) Cheltenham (Festival) | BBC Northern Orchestra, Hurst |
| Searle, Humphrey | The Sun, cantata for a cappella choir, Op. 42 | 1964-07-07 | (United Kingdom) Cheltenham (Festival) | BBC Chorus, Melville |
| Sherlaw Johnson Robert | Piano Sonata | 1964-07-11 | (United Kingdom) Cheltenham (Festival) | Sherlaw Johnson |
| Stockhausen, Karlheinz | Mikrophonie I | 1964-12-09 | (Belgium) Brussels | Aloys Kontarsky, Caskel, Fritsch, Bernhard Kontarsky, Davies, Spek, Stockhausen |
| Stockhausen, Karlheinz | Plus-Minus | 1964-06-14 | (Italy) Rome | Cardew, Rzewski |
| Wilks, John | Beata l'alma | 1964-07-06 | (United Kingdom) Cheltenham (Festival) | Nendick / BBC Northern Orchestra, Hurst |

=== Compositions ===
- Gilbert Amy
  - Alpha-beth, for flute, oboe, clarinet, bass clarinet, bassoon, and horn
  - Cahiers d'épigrammes, for piano
- Eyvin Andersen – Concerto for violin and orchestra
- Jurriaan Andriessen – After the Fall, incidental music
- Louis Andriessen
  - A Flower Song II, for oboe
  - A Flower Song III, for cello
  - Ittrospezione III, for two pianos and three instrumental groups,
  - Sweet, for alto recorder
- Malcolm Arnold
  - Pieces (5), for violin and piano, Op. 84
  - Sinfonietta No. 3, for orchestra, Op. 81
  - A Sunshine Overture, for orchestra, Op. 83
  - Water Music, for winds and percussion, Op. 82
- Milton Babbitt
  - Ensembles for Synthesizer, for four-track tape
  - Philomel, for soprano and four-track tape
- Samuel Barber
  - Chorale for Ascension Day, for chorus, brass, timpani, and organ (ad lib.)
  - Night Flight, for orchestra, Op.19a,
- Luciano Berio
  - Chemins I on Sequenza II, for harp and orchestra
  - Folk Songs, for soprano and seven instruments
  - Rounds, for voice and harpsichord (subsequently withdrawn)
  - Traces, for soprano, mezzo-soprano, two actors, chorus, and orchestra (subsequently withdrawn)
- Harrison Birtwistle
  - Entr'actes and Sappho Fragments, for soprano, flute, oboe, violin, viola, harp, and percussion
  - Three Movements with Fanfares, for chamber orchestra
- Rob du Bois
  - Deuxième série de rondeaux, for piano four-hands and optional percussion
  - Just Like a Little Sonata, for piano
  - Pastorale VI, for piano
  - Pastorale VII, for alto recorder
  - Quartet, for oboe, violin, violin, and cello (revised version)
- Benjamin Britten
  - Cadenza for Haydn's Cello Concerto in C major
  - Suite No. 1 for cello solo, Op. 72
  - Symphony for Cello and Orchestra, op. 68 (revised version)
- Earle Brown – Corroboree, for three or two pianos
- Carlos Chávez
  - Concerto for four horns and orchestra (revision)
  - Fuga HAGC, for violin, viola, cello, and contrabass
  - Resonancias, for orchestra
  - Tambuco, for six percussionists
- Aaron Copland
  - Down a Country Lane, for school orchestra
  - Emblems, for symphonic band
  - Music for a Great City
- George Crumb – Four Nocturnes (Night Music II) for violin and piano
- Luigi Dallapiccola
  - Parole di San Paolo, for mezzo-soprano or boy's voice and 11 instruments
  - Quattro liriche di Antonio Machado, version for soprano and chamber orchestra
- Mario Davidovsky
  - Electronic Study No. 3
  - Synchronisms No. 2 for flute, clarinet, violin, cello and tape
  - Synchronisms No. 3 for cello and electronic sound
- Peter Maxwell Davies
  - Little Pieces (5), for piano
  - Second Fantasia on John Taverner's In Nomine, for orchestra
  - Shakespeare Music, for 11 instruments
- Michel Decoust – Horizon remarquable (lyrics by René Char)
- David Diamond
  - The Martyr for male choir (revised version)
  - "My Papa's Waltz", for voice and piano
  - "Prayer", for voice and piano
  - String Quartet No. 8
  - Symphony No. 5
  - We Two, song cycle, voice and piano
- Andrzej Dobrowolski – Music for Strings and Four Groups of Wind Instruments
- Henri Dutilleux – Métaboles
- Morton Feldman
  - The King of Denmark, for percussion solo
  - Numbers, for flute, horn, trombone, tuba, percussion, celesta, piano, violin, and contrabass
  - Piano Piece
  - Vertical Thoughts IV, for piano
- Wolfgang Fortner
  - Epigramme, for piano
  - Minne, cantata for tenor and guitar
  - Zyklus, for cello and piano
- Gara Garayev
  - Symphony No. 3
- Roberto Gerhard
  - The Anger of Achilles, incidental music
  - Macbeth, incidental music
- Alberto Ginastera
  - Bomarzo cantata, for tenor or baritone, narrator, and chamber orchestra, Op. 32
  - Don Rodrigo Symphony, for soprano and orchestra, Op. 31a
- Alexander Goehr
  - Five Poems and an Epigram of William Blake, for chorus and trumpet, Op. 17
  - Pieces (3), for piano, Op. 18
- Karel Goeyvaerts – Stuk voor piano en tape
- Fernando Lopes Graça
  - Canciones (4), for voice and chamber orchestra (revised version)
  - Prelúdio, capricho e galope, for violin and piano (second revision)
  - Romances, for voice and piano
  - Sonnets (4), for voice and piano
  - String Quartet No. 1
- Ferde Grofé – World's Fair Suite
- Alois Hába
  - String Quartet No. no.15, Op. 95, in 1/5-tones
  - Suite, for bass clarinet solo, Op. 96
- Roy Harris
  - Epilogue to Profiles in Courage–JFK, for orchestra
  - Etudes for Pedals, for organ
  - Fantasy, for organ, brass, and timpani
  - Horn of Plenty, for orchestra
  - Jubilate for Worship (Alleluia), for SATB choir, brass, piano, and percussion
  - Salute to Youth, for orchestra
  - Sonata, for cello and piano
- Hans Werner Henze
  - Chor gefangener Trojer, for chorus and orchestra (revised version)
  - Divertimenti, for two pianos
  - Der Frieden, incidental music
  - Ein Landarzt, opera in one-act (revised from the 1951 radio opera version)
  - Lieder von einer Insel, for chamber chorus, trombone, two cellos, contrabass, chamber organ, percussion, and timpani
  - Sinfonische Etüden (3), for orchestra (revised version)
  - Tancredi, ballet, for orchestra
  - Zwischenspiele (from Der junge Lord), for orchestra
- Alan Hovhaness
  - Bagatelles (4), for string quartet, Op. 30
  - Floating World "Ukiyo", for orchestra, Op. 209
  - Haiku (3), for piano, op. 113
  - Meditation on Zeami, for orchestra, Op. 207
  - Sonata, for flute solo, Op. 118
  - Sonata, for 2 oboes and organ, Op. 130 (revised version)
  - String Quartet no.3, Op. 208, No. 1
  - String Quartet no. 4, Op. 208, No. 2
  - Variations and Fugue, for orchestra, Op. 18
- Kan Ishii – Otokonoko ga umareta, for chorus
- Maki Ishii – Galgenlieder
- Wojciech Kilar – Diphthongos for mixed choir and orchestra
- Włodzimierz Kotoński
  - Monochromia, for oboe solo
  - Pezzo, for flute and piano
  - Wind Quintet
- György Ligeti – Fragment, for ten instruments (revised version)
- David Lumsdaine – Annotations of Auschwitz (cantata with words by Peter Porter)
- Witold Lutosławski – String Quartet
- Bruno Maderna
  - Aria da "Hyperion", for soprano, flute, and orchestra
  - Dimensioni IV, for flute, piccolo, alto flute, bass flute, and chamber orchestra
- Yoritsune Matsudaira
  - Chamber Concerto, for harpsichord and harp
  - Concerto No. 1 for piano and orchestra
- Toshirō Mayuzumi
  - Campanology Olympica, electronic music
  - Ongaku no tanjō, for orchestra
  - Raihai jokyoku, for orchestra
- Olivier Messiaen
  - Et exspecto resurrectionem mortuorum, for 34 wind instruments and 3 percussionists
  - Prélude, for piano
- Darius Milhaud
  - Adam, for soprano, 2 tenors, and 2 baritones, Op. 411
  - Adieu (cantata), for voice, flute, viola, and harp, Op. 410
  - L'amour chanté, for voice and piano, Op. 409
  - Concerto for harpsichord and orchestra, Op. 407
  - Septet, for 2 violins, 2 violas, 2 cellos, and contrabass, Op. 408
- İlhan Mimaroğlu
  - Agony, for magnetic tape
  - Le Tombeau d'Edgar A. Poe, for magnetic tape
  - Intermezzo, for magnetic tape
  - Bowery Bum, for magnetic tape
- Makoto Moroi
  - Pieces (5), for shakuhachi
  - Toccata, Sarabande, and Tarantella, for piano and two string orchestras
- Bo Nilsson – La bran, for chorus and orchestra
- Luigi Nono
  - Da un diario italiano, for two choruses
  - La fabbrica illuminata, for mezzo-soprano and tape
- Juan Orrego-Salas
  - Concerto, for winds, Op. 53
  - Sonata, for violin and piano, op. 9 (revised version)
  - Sonata a 4 (Edgewood Sonata), for flute, oboe, harpsichord, and contrabass, Op. 55
- Luis de Pablo – Escena, for SATB choir, strings, and percussion
- Arvo Pärt
  - Collage über B-A-C-H, oboe, harpsichord, piano, and strings
  - Diagramme, for piano, Op.11
  - Musica sillabica, for 12 instruments, Op. 12
  - Quintettino, for wind quintet
- Juan Carlos Paz
  - Concreción 1964, for flute, clarinet, bassoon, horn, trumpet, trombone, and tuba
  - Galaxia 64, for organ
  - Música para piano y orquesta
- Krzysztof Penderecki
  - Cantata in honorem Almae Matris Universitatis Iagellonicae sescentos abhinc annos fundatae, for 2 choruses, contrabassoon, brass, percussion, piano, and organ
  - Pieśń żałobna ku czci B. Rutkowskiego, for chorus
  - Sonata, for cello and orchestra
- Vincent Persichetti
  - Cummings Choruses (4), for two voices and piano, Op. 98
  - Introit, for string orchestra, Op. 96
  - Winter Cantata (11 Haiku), for four-part women's choir, flute, and marimba, Op. 97
- Goffredo Petrassi
  - Concerto for Orchestra No. 7
  - Sesto non-senso, for a cappella choir
  - Tre per sette, for piccolo (+ flute + alto flute), oboe (+ English horn), E♭ clarinet (+ clarinet)
- Walter Piston
  - Quartet for violin, viola, cello, and piano
  - Sextet for strings
- Terry Riley – In C
- Hilding Rosenberg – Sönerna (Cain and Abel), ballet, for orchestra
- Ahmed Adnan Saygun – Ten Etudes on "Aksak" Rhythms, for piano
- R. Murray Schafer – Statement in Blue, for youth orchestra
- Dieter Schnebel
  - Compositio, for orchestra (revised version)
  - Concert sans orchestre (réactions 2), for piano and audience
- William Schuman – Amaryllis Variations, for string trio
- Dmitri Shostakovich
  - String Quartet No. 9 in E-flat major, Op. 117
  - String Quartet No. 10 in A-flat major, Op. 118
- Karlheinz Stockhausen
  - Mikrophonie I
  - Mixtur for five orchestra groups, sine-wave generators, and ring modulators
- Igor Stravinsky
  - Elegy for J.F.K., for baritone or mezzo-soprano and 3 clarinets
  - Fanfare for a New Theatre, for two trumpets
- Tōru Takemitsu
  - Blue Aurora for Toshi Ichiyanagi, theatre piece
  - Ichinotani monogatari, incidental music
  - Natsukashino San Francisco, for tape
- James Tenney – Music for Player Piano
- Mikis Theodorakis – Axion Esti
- Virgil Thomson
  - Autumn, concertino for harp, strings, and percussion
  - Auvergnat Folk Songs (5), for SATB choir and orchestra
  - The Feast of Love, for baritone and orchestra
  - Pilgrims and Pioneers, for band
  - When I Survey the Bright Celestial Sphere, for unison voices and organ or piano
- Iannis Xenakis
  - Eonta, for two trumpets, three trombones, and piano
  - Hiketides: les suppliates d'Eschyle, for 50 female voices and 10 instruments or orchestra
- La Monte Young
  - Bowed Mortar Relays, action work, realization of Composition 1960 no. 9
  - Eat (music for the film by Andy Warhol), for tape
  - Haircut (music for the film by Andy Warhol), for tape
  - Kiss (music for the film by Andy Warhol), for tape
  - Prelude to The Tortoise, for voices, various instruments, and electronic drones
  - Sleep (music for the film by Andy Warhol), for tape
  - The Tortoise Droning Selected Pitches from The Holy Numbers for The Two Black Tigers, The Green Tiger and The Hermit, for voices, various instruments, and electronic drones
  - The Tortoise Recalling The Drone of The Holy Numbers as They Were Revealed in the Dreams of The Whirlwind and The Obsidian Gong and Illuminated by The Sawmill, The Green Sawtooth Ocelot and The High-Tension Line Stepdown Transformer, for voices, various instruments, and electronic drones
  - The Well-Tuned Piano
- Joji Yuasa – Projection Esemplastic with White Noise, electronic music
- Bernd Alois Zimmermann
  - Monologue, for two pianos
  - Un petit rien, for small orchestra

== Opera ==
- Jurriaan Andriessen – Het zwarte blondje
- Samuel Barber – Vanessa (revised version)
- Benjamin Britten – Curlew River (church parable)
- Alberto Ginastera – Don Rodrigo, op. 31
- Bruno Maderna – Hyperion
- Gian Carlo Menotti – Martin's Lie
- Joaquín Rodrigo – El hijo fingido (zarzuela)
- Robert Ward – The Lady from Colorado
- Hugo Weisgall – Athaliah

== Musical theater ==
- Hello, Dolly! (Jerry Herman) – Broadway production opened at the St. James Theatre on January 16 and ran for 2844 performances
- What Makes Sammy Run? – Broadway production opened at the 54th Street Theater on February 27 and ran for 540 performances
- Funny Girl (Jule Styne and Bob Merrill) – Broadway production opened at the Winter Garden Theatre on March 26 and ran for 1348 performances
- Anyone Can Whistle – Broadway production opened at the Majestic Theatre on April 4 and ran for 9 performances
- Fiddler on the Roof (Jerry Bock and Sheldon Harnick) – Broadway production opened at the Imperial Theatre on September 22 and ran for 3242 performances
- Foxy Book: Ian McLellan Hunter & Ring Lardner, Jr. Lyrics: Johnny Mercer Music: Robert Emmett Dolan. Broadway production opened on February 16 and ran for 72 performances. Starring Bert Lahr, Larry Blyden, Cathryn Damon and Julienne Marie.
- Golden Boy – Broadway production opened at the Majestic Theatre on October 20 and ran for 569 performances
- She Loves Me – London production opened at the Lyric Theatre on April 29 and ran for 189 performances
- Maggie May London production opened at the Adelphi Theatre on September 22 and ran for 501 performances
- Robert and Elizabeth – London production opened at the Lyric Theatre on October 20 and ran for 948 performances
- Little Me, the musical – London production opened at the Cambridge Theatre on November 18 and ran for 334 performances
- Salad Days (Julian Slade) – London revival

== Musical films ==
- Ayee Milan Ki Bela, with music by Shankar Jaikishan
- Dosti, starring Sanjay Khan, with music by Laxmikant-Pyarelal
- A Hard Day's Night starring The Beatles
- Mary Poppins starring Julie Andrews, Dick Van Dyke, Glynis Johns and David Tomlinson
- My Fair Lady starring Rex Harrison and Audrey Hepburn
- Robin and the 7 Hoods starring Frank Sinatra, Bing Crosby, Dean Martin and Sammy Davis, Jr.
- The Umbrellas of Cherbourg (Les Parapluies de Cherbourg)
- The Unsinkable Molly Brown starring Debbie Reynolds and Harve Presnell
- Viva Las Vegas starring Elvis Presley and Ann-Margret

== Births ==
- January 5 – Grant Young (Soul Asylum)
- January 10 – Brad Roberts (Crash Test Dummies)
- January 11 – Torstein Aagaard-Nilsen, composer
- January 15 – Osmo Tapio Räihälä, composer
- January 29 – Roddy Frame (Aztec Camera)
- January 30 – Marcel Jacob, Swedish rock bassist Talisman (d. 2009)
- January 31 – Jeff Hanneman, American rock guitarist (Slayer) (d. 2013)
- February 1 – Jani Lane, American singer-songwriter and guitarist (Warrant and Saints of the Underground) (d. 2011)
- February 4 – Noodles of The Offspring
- February 5 – Duff McKagan (Guns N' Roses Velvet Revolver
- February 23 – John Norum, Europe guitarist
- March 1 – Clinton Gregory, American musician
- March 10 – Neneh Cherry, Swedish singer and songwriter
- March 11 – Vinnie Paul, drummer (Pantera, Damageplan)
- March 16 – H. P. Baxxter, German singer and rapper (Scooter)
- March 18 – Rozalla, Zambian singer
- March 19 – Yoko Kanno, composer
- March 20 – Natacha Atlas, Belgian singer
- March 30 – Tracy Chapman, American singer-songwriter
- April 5 – Princess Erika, French singer
- April 7 – Russell Crowe, New Zealand born, Australian actor and singer
- April 11 – Steve Azar, American country music singer-songwriter
- April 12 – Amy Ray American musician (Indigo Girls)
- April 16
  - Dave Pirner (Soul Asylum)
  - Esbjörn Svensson Swedish jazz pianist (d. 2008)
- April 17 – Maynard James Keenan (Tool)
- April 18 – Bez, British dancer
- April 20 – Jeff Geggus Lead singer (Cockney Rejects)
- April 25
  - Andy Bell, singer (Erasure)
  - Kenji Yamamoto, Japanese video game composer
- April 30 – Kent James, American singer-songwriter
- May 6 – Tony Scalzo, American rock musician and songwriter (Fastball (band)|Fastball]])
- May 11
  - Tara Kemp, American singer
  - Tim Blake Nelson, American actor, writer and director
- May 14 – Gordon Duncan, bagpiper, low-whistle player and composer (d. 2005)
- May 23 - Kevin Duala, British actor and TV Presenter
- May 26 – Lenny Kravitz, American singer-songwriter, producer and guitarist
- May 28 - David Baddiel, English comedian, presenter, screenwriter and author
- May 30
  - Wynonna Judd, American country singer
  - Tom Morello, American rock guitarist (Rage Against the Machine, Audioslave, The Nightwatchman)
  - Chris Sharrock, English drummer (The La's)
- May 31
  - Darryl McDaniels (Run-D.M.C.)
  - Frost
- June 3 – Kerry King, American rock guitarist (Slayer)
- June 6 – Jay Bentley (Bad Religion)
- June 10 – Jimmy Chamberlin, American rock musician (The Smashing Pumpkins)
- June 13 – Robbie Merrill (Godsmack)
- June 22
  - Dicky Barrett (The Mighty Mighty Bosstones)
  - Mike Edwards (Jesus Jones)
- June 29 – Stedman Pearson, British R&B singer (Five Star)
- June 19 – Brian Vander Ark, American singer-songwriter, guitarist and actor (The Verve Pipe)
- July 9 – Courtney Love, American singer, songwriter, actress and visual artist (Hole, Pagan Babies (band))
- July 13
  - Brent Fischer, American composer, arranger, bandleader, bass guitarist and percussionist
  - Paul Thorn, American singer-songwriter and guitarist
- July 17 – Craig Morgan, American singer-songwriter and guitarist
- July 19 – Masahiko Kondō, Japanese singer
- July 20 – Chris Cornell (Soundgarden & Audioslave) (d. 2017)
- July 22 – Will Calhoun (Living Colour)
- July 23 – Nick Menza, German drummer and songwriter (Megadeth and Memorain)
- July 31 – C. C. Catch, German pop singer
- July 31 – Jim Corr, Irish singer and musician (The Corrs)
- August 1 – Adam Duritz (Counting Crows)
- August 3 – Lucky Dube, South African reggae musician (d. 2007)
- August 5 – Adam Yauch (Beastie Boys) (d. 2012)
- August 17 – Colin James, Canadian singer-songwriter
- August 29 – Pebbles, American R&B singer, songwriter and businesswoman
- September 2 - Keanu Reeves, Canadian-American actor and musician.
- September 7
  - Eazy-E (NWA) (d. 1995)
  - Towa Tei, Japanese artist and DJ (Deee-Lite)
- September 11 – Victor Wooten, American bassist
- September 19 – Trisha Yearwood, American country singer and songwriter
- September 23 – Koshi Inaba, Japanese rock singer (B'z)
- September 26 – Nicki French, British singer
- September 27 – Stephan Jenkins, American rock singer (Third Eye Blind)
- September 30
  - Trey Anastasio, American musician
  - Robby Takac, Goo Goo Dolls
- October 4 – Francis Magalona, Filipino rapper (d. 2009)
- October 5 – Dave Dededer, Presidents of the United States of America
- October 6 – Matthew Sweet, rock musician
- October 7 – Sam Brown, singer, daughter of Joe Brown
- October 10 - Sarah Lancashire, English actress and director
- October 10 – Neneh Cherry, singer
- October 20
  - Frederic Chiu, pianist
  - Luciano, reggae singer
  - Jim Sonefeld (Hootie & TheBlowfish)
- October 22 – Toby McKeehan, American musician
- October 23 – Robert Trujillo (Metallica)
- October 30 – Silvano Monasterios, pianist and composer
- November 1 – Sophie B. Hawkins, American singer-songwriter, musician and painter
- November 6
  - Corey Glover (Living Colour)
  - Greg Graffin (Bad Religion)
- November 12
  - Vic Chesnutt, American singer-songwriter and guitarist (brute. and The Undertow Orchestra) (d. 2009)
  - David Ellefson, American bass player and songwriter (Megadeth, Avian and F5)
- November 14
  - Joseph Simmons (Run-D.M.C.)
  - Nic Dalton (The Lemonheads)
- November 16 – Diana Krall, Canadian jazz pianist and singer
- November 19 – Vince Leigh, Australian drummer (Pseudo Echo)
- November 24 – Tony Rambola (Godsmack)
- November 25 – Mark Lanegan, American rock singer (Screaming Trees)
- December 8 – Teri Hatcher, American actress, voice-actress, writer, singer, YouTuber, dancer and cheerleader
- December 9 – Paul Landers, German rock musician (Rammstein)
- December 11
  - Justin Currie, Scottish singer-songwriter and guitarist (Del Amitri and The Uncle Devil Show)
  - Dave Schools, American singer-songwriter, bass player and producer (Widespread Panic, Stockholm Syndrome and J Mascis + The Fog)
  - Cosy Sheridan, American singer-songwriter
- December 13 – Hideto Matsumoto (Hide), Japanese rock musician (d. 1998)
- December 18 – Robson Green, English actor, singer-songwriter, and television presenter (Robson & Jerome)
- December 23 – Eddie Vedder, American rock singer (Pearl Jam)
- December 28 – Malcolm Gets, American actor and dancer
- date unknown
  - Kyaw Kyaw Naing, Burmese traditional musician
  - Michael Haussman, American artist, writer, producer and director of motion pictures, television advertisements and music videos
  - Nitin Sawhney, British Indian musician, producer and composer

== Deaths ==
- January 7 – Colin McPhee, Canadian composer and musicologist, 63
- January 9 – Big Boy Goudie, jazz saxophonist,
- January 15 – Jack Teagarden, jazz trombonist and vocalist, 58 (pneumonia/heart attack)
- January 22 – Marc Blitzstein, composer, 58
- January 27 – Leib Glantz, musicologist, 65
- February 25 – Johnny Burke, lyricist, 55
- March 8 – Renata Borgatti, Italian pianist, 69 or 70
- March 27 – Emil Reesen, Danish composer, conductor and pianist, 76
- April 4 – Georgia Caine, Broadway star, 87
- May 10 – Carol Haney, dancer and choreographer, 39 (pneumonia)
- May 24 – Gali Penchala Narasimha Rao, film composer
- June 10 – Louis Gruenberg, pianist and composer, 79
- June 29 – Eric Dolphy, American jazz saxophonist, flautist and bass clarinettist, 36 (diabetic coma)
- July 1 – Pierre Monteux, French conductor, 89
- July 10 – Joe Haymes, bandleader and arranger, 57 (heart failure)
- July 31 – Jim Reeves, American country singer, 40 (plane crash)
- August 9 – Chucho Monge, Mexican songwriter, 53
- August 14 – Johnny Burnette, rockabilly singer, 30 (drowned)
- September 20 – Lazare Lévy, French pianist and teacher, 82
- September 28
  - Nacio Herb Brown, songwriter and film/TV composer, 68
  - George Dyson, English composer, 81
  - Harpo Marx, American comedian and musician, 75
- October 10
  - Eddie Cantor, comedian, singer and songwriter, 72
  - Heinrich Neuhaus, Soviet (of German extraction) pianist and teacher, 76
- October 15
  - Antoine-Elisée Cherbuliez, Swiss musicologist, organist, and composer, 76
  - Cole Porter, American songwriter and composer, 73
- October 29 – Vasily Agapkin, Soviet composer
- November 5 – Buddy Cole, jazz pianist and orchestra leader, 45 (heart attack)
- November 30 – Don Redman, US arranger, bandleader and saxophonist
- December 2 – Sam H. Stept, Russian-born US songwriter, pianist and conductor, 67
- December 9 – Edith Sitwell, poet and collaborator of William Walton
- December 11
  - Alma Mahler, songwriter and widow of Gustav Mahler
  - Sam Cooke, singer, 33 (shot)
- December 14 – Francisco Canaro, Uruguayan violinist and tango orchestra leader, 76
- December 21 – Theodor Blumer, composer and conductor, 83

== Awards ==
=== Grammy Awards ===
- Grammy Awards of 1964

=== Eurovision Song Contest ===
- Eurovision Song Contest 1964

== See also ==
- Other events of 1964
- Hot 100 No. 1 Hits of 1964,
- 1963 in music
- 1965 in music
- Other 'years in music'
