= The Great Years =

Greatest hits album by Johnny Mathis
- Released: 1964
- Recorded: 1956–1963
- Genre: Vocal
- Length: 79:00
- Label: Columbia
- Producer: Ernie Altschuler; George Avakian; Frank DeVol; Al Ham; Mitch Miller; Irving Townsend

Johnny Mathis chronology
The Wonderful World of Make Believe (1964)	The Great Years (1964)	This Is Love (1964)

Professional ratings
Review scores
Source	Rating
Billboard	positive
The Encyclopedia of Popular Music	3/5 stars

The Great Years is a compilation album by American pop singer Johnny Mathis that was released by Columbia Records in July 1964. Billboard magazine described the two-LP set, which included chart hits and album tracks, as "the best of Mathis".

The album made its first appearance on Billboard's Top LP's chart the following month, in the issue dated August 1, and peaked at number 88 over the course of 10 weeks.

== Reception ==
Billboard opined that "Mathis fans should scream with delight upon discovering this 2-LP package."

== Track listing ==
=== Side one ===
1. "Fly Me to the Moon (In Other Words)" (Bart Howard) – 3:54
  - recorded on 4/6/56 for his debut album, Johnny Mathis
2. "Street of Dreams" (Victor Young, Sam M. Lewis) – 2:17
  - rec. 3/14/56 for Johnny Mathis
3. "Wonderful! Wonderful!" (Sherman Edwards, Ben Raleigh) – 2:50
  - rec. 9/20/56, released on 11/5/56; Most Played by Jockeys: #14
4. "It's Not for Me to Say" from Lizzie (Robert Allen, Al Stillman) – 3:05
  - rec. 9/20/56, rel. 2/25/57; Most Played by Jockeys: #5
5. "Chances Are" (Robert Allen, Al Stillman) – 3:03
  - rec. 6/16/57, rel. 8/12/57; Most Played by Jockeys: #1 (1 week)
6. "The Twelfth of Never" (Jerry Livingston, Paul Francis Webster) – 2:28
  - rec. 6/16/57, rel. 8/12/57; B-side of "Chances Are"; Most Played by Jockeys: #9

Personnel

- George Avakian – producer (tracks 1, 2)
- Al Ham – producer (tracks 3–6)^{[A]}
- Mitch Miller – producer (tracks 3–6)
- ^{A} The labels on the singles of these tracks did not provide producer credits, but some CD compilations have. While all of these compilations acknowledge Mitch Miller as a producer on the tracks noted, the ones that credit Al Ham as an additional producer on certain songs disagree on which ones those are. The 2006 collection Gold: A 50th Anniversary Celebration only recognizes Ham as producer on "Wonderful! Wonderful!" and "It's Not for Me to Say" but the 2004 collection The Essential Johnny Mathis also credits him in this capacity on "Chances Are" and "The Twelfth of Never".

=== Side two ===
1. "A Certain Smile" from A Certain Smile (Sammy Fain, Paul Francis Webster) – 2:47
  - rec. 5/12/58, rel. 6/2/58; Billboard Hot 100: #14
2. "Deep River" (traditional) – 2:51
  - rec. 1/3/58 for his album Good Night, Dear Lord
3. "Can't Get Out of This Mood" from Seven Days' Leave (Frank Loesser, Jimmy McHugh) – 3:08
  - rec. 5/15/58 for his album Swing Softly
4. "Misty" (Johnny Burke, Erroll Garner) – 3:34
  - rec. 4/21/59 for his album Heavenly; single rel. 9/59; Billboard Hot 100: #12
5. "Small World" from Gypsy (Stephen Sondheim, Jule Styne) – 3:18
  - rec. 4/29/59, rel. 5/25/59; Billboard Hot 100: #20
6. "When I Fall in Love" (Edward Heyman, Victor Young) – 4:31
  - rec. 1958 for his 1959 album Open Fire, Two Guitars

Personnel

- Al Ham – producer (tracks 1, 4, 5)
- Mitch Miller – producer (tracks 1, 2, 3, 4, 6)

=== Side three ===
1. "Maria" from West Side Story (Leonard Bernstein, Stephen Sondheim) – 3:48
  - rec. 11/6/59 for his album Faithfully; single rel. 5/60; Billboard Hot 100: #78; single rel. 11/61; Billboard Hot 100: #88
2. "Tonight" from West Side Story (Bernstein, Sondheim) – 3:12
  - rec. 11/6/59 for his album Faithfully
3. "How to Handle a Woman" from Camelot (Alan Jay Lerner, Frederick Loewe) – 3:02
  - rec. 10/27/60, rel. 11/7/60; Billboard Hot 100: #64
4. "Stairway to the Stars" (Matty Malneck, Mitchell Parish, Frank Signorelli) – 4:51
  - rec. 2/7/61 for his album I'll Buy You A Star
5. "Love Look Away" from Flower Drum Song (Oscar Hammerstein II, Richard Rodgers) – 3:28
  - rec. 2/7/61 for his album I'll Buy You A Star
6. "Sweet Thursday" (Jerry Livingston, Paul Francis Webster) – 2:30
  - rec. 10/9/61, rel. 12/29/61; Billboard Hot 100: #99

Personnel

- Mitch Miller – producer (tracks 1–2, 3)
- Irving Townsend – producer (tracks 4–5, 6)

=== Side four ===
1. "Stella by Starlight" (Ned Washington, Victor Young) – 3:33
  - rec. 8/8/62 for his album Rapture
2. "Unaccustomed As I Am" (Ray Ellis, Al Stillman) – 2:55
  - rec. 3/4/61, rel. 4/27/62; non-charting B-side
3. "Gina" (Leon Carr, Paul Vance) – 2:46
  - rec. 8/9/62, rel. 9/7/62; Billboard Hot 100: #6, Easy Listening: #2
4. "What Will Mary Say" (Eddie Snyder, Paul Vance) – 3:09
  - rec. 8/9/62, rel. 1/4/63; Billboard Hot 100: #9 Easy Listening: #3
5. "Every Step of the Way" (Robert Allen, Al Stillman) – 3:21
  - rec. 5/31/60, rel. 5/7/63; Billboard Hot 100: #30 Easy Listening: #10
6. "September Song" from Knickerbocker Holiday (Maxwell Anderson, Kurt Weill) – 4:07
  - rec. 2/26/63 for his album Romantically

Personnel

- Ernie Altschuler – producer (tracks 1, 3–4, 6)
- Frank DeVol – producer (track 2)
- Mitch Miller – producer (track 5)

== Personnel ==
- Johnny Mathis – vocals
- Don Hunstein – cover photo

== Bibliography ==
- Whitburn, Joel (2007), Joel Whitburn Presents Billboard Top Adult Songs, 1961-2006, Record Research Inc., ISBN 0-89820-169-1
- Whitburn, Joel (2009), Joel Whitburn's Top Pop Singles, 1955-2008, Record Research Inc., ISBN 0898201802
- Whitburn, Joel (2010), Joel Whitburn Presents Top Pop Albums, Seventh Edition, Record Research Inc., ISBN 0-89820-183-7
