= Tender Is the Night (Johnny Mathis album) =

Studio album by Johnny Mathis
- Released: January 23, 1964
- Recorded: October – November 1963
- Genre: Vocal; pop/rock
- Length: 40:47
- Label: Mercury
- Producer: Johnny Mathis

Johnny Mathis chronology
Romantically (1963)	Tender Is the Night (1964)	I'll Search My Heart and Other Great Hits (1964)

Tender Is the Night is an album by American pop singer Johnny Mathis that was released by Mercury Records on January 23, 1964, and included selections from stage and screen as well as two new songs from "Fly Me to the Moon" composer Bart Howard.

This first of four studio albums that Mathis released that year debuted on Billboard magazine's Top LP's chart in the issue dated February 15, 1964, and remained there for 28 weeks, peaking at number 13. it debuted on the Cashbox albums chart in the issue dated December 21, 1963, remaining on that chart for a total of 41 weeks and hitting a peak position of number eight.

The album was released on compact disc as one of two albums in a two-CD set by Sony Music Entertainment on August 28, 2012, the other album being Mathis's follow-up from the summer of 1964, The Wonderful World of Make Believe. Tender Is The Night was also included in Sony's Mathis box set The Complete Global Albums Collection, which was released on November 17, 2014.

== History ==
Mathis had collaborated with Don Costa on his four previous studio albums (Rapture, Johnny, Romantically, and Sounds of Christmas), and used him again here as both arranger and conductor. In an interview for the 2012 CD release, Mathis said, "'Tender Is the Night was a wonderful time for me because I got to work with Don Costa again. A great guy. And, you know, he did all his stuff while we were on the date…I mean, he was writing and rewriting there on the date.'" For the liner notes of The Complete Global Albums Collection, Mathis wrote of Costa's arrangement of "Laura", "To this day, whenever I do concerts with symphony orchestras, which I do a lot, this is the most popular song I do because of Don Costa’s exquisite orchestrations."

Another song on the album gave Mathis the opportunity to provide some insight into his emphasis upon including as many verses as he does: "'I loved singing songs that were part of that great songbook that was recorded at the time by Ella Fitzgerald and eventually Sarah Vaughan. I listened to those things over and over, learning songs like "A Ship Without a Sail". I used to just sit on the bed and play those songs over and over and learn the verses. That’s the reason I sang so many verses on my recordings…I listened to Ella and Sarah do the verses…and they sang them meticulously.'"

== Reception ==
Professional ratings
Review scores
Source	Rating
Record Mirror	3/5 stars
The Encyclopedia of Popular Music	4/5 stars

Cashbox noted Mathis "is in superb voice as he renders "No Strings," "Call Me Irresponsible", and "Somewhere.", calling the album "One of the best albums that [Mathis] has cut in quite a while. "

Record Mirror stated that the album features a "very grow-on-you material here, and although this isn't his best L.P. we feel that no Mathis collector should be without it." The Encyclopedia of Popular Music gave the album a four-star rating.

== Track listing ==
=== Side one ===
1. "Tender Is the Night" from Tender Is the Night (Sammy Fain, Paul Francis Webster) - 3:44
2. "Laura" from Laura (David Raksin, Johnny Mercer) - 4:38
3. "No Strings" from No Strings (Richard Rodgers) - 3:13
4. "I Can't Give You Anything But Love" from Blackbirds of 1928 (Jimmy McHugh, Dorothy Fields) - 2:46
5. "April Love" from April Love (Sammy Fain, Paul Francis Webster)- 2:58
6. "Call Me Irresponsible" from Papa's Delicate Condition (Sammy Cahn, Jimmy Van Heusen) - 3:42

=== Side two ===
1. "A Dream Is a Wish Your Heart Makes" from Cinderella (Mack David, Al Hoffman, Jerry Livingston) - 3:01
2. "A Ship Without a Sail" from Head's Up! (Richard Rodgers, Lorenz Hart) - 4:08
3. "Forget Me Not" (Bart Howard) - 2:33
4. "Where Is Love?" from Oliver! (Lionel Bart) - 2:26
5. "Somewhere" from West Side Story (Leonard Bernstein, Stephen Sondheim) - 4:32
6. "Tomorrow Song" (Bart Howard)- 3:06

== Charts ==
Chart (1964)	Peak position
US Top LPs (Billboard)	13
US Cash Box	8

== Personnel ==
- Johnny Mathis – vocals; producer
- Don Costa – arranger, conductor
- Okamoto/London – cover design

== Bibliography ==
- Whitburn, Joel (2010), Joel Whitburn Presents Top Pop Albums, Seventh Edition, Record Research Inc., ISBN 978-0-89820-183-3
- Hoffmann, Frank W (1988), The Cash box album charts, 1955-1974, Scarecrow Press, ISBN 0-810-82005-6
- Larkin, Colin (2007), The Encyclopedia of Popular Music, Omnibus Press, ISBN 9-7818-4609-8567
