= Sooner or Later (Johnny Mathis song) =

- US 7-inch single

Single by Johnny Mathis

from the album I'll Search My Heart and Other Great Hits
- B-side: "In Wisconsin"
- Released: July 30, 1963
- Recorded: August 9, 1962
- Genre: Pop
- Length: 3:20
- Label: Columbia
- Songwriters: Thomas Garlock; Alan Jeffreys
- Producer: Ernie Altschuler

Johnny Mathis singles chronology
"Every Step of the Way" / "No Man Can Stand Alone" (1963)	"Sooner or Later" (1963)	"Come Back" / "Your Teenage Dreams" (1963)

Music video
- "Sooner or Later" on YouTube

"Sooner or Later" is a popular song written by Thomas Garlock and Alan Jeffreys that was recorded by Johnny Mathis in 1962. It charted in 1963.

== Recording and release ==
Johnny Mathis recorded "Sooner or Later" on August 9, 1962, with an orchestra conducted by Don Costa. It was produced by Ernie Altschuler and released as a single one year later, on July 30, 1963.

== Chart performance ==
"Sooner or Later" debuted on the Billboard Hot 100 in the issue of the magazine dated September 7, 1963, and peaked at number 84 two weeks later, in the September 21 issue. The song stayed on the Hot 100 for three weeks. It also reached number five on Cash Box magazine's Looking Ahead chart, which was described as a "compilation, in order of strength, of up and coming records showing signs of breaking into The Cash Box Top 100".

== Critical reception ==
In their review column, the editors of Cash Box featured the single as their Pick of the Week, which was their equivalent to a letter grade of A for both "Sooner or Later" and its B-side, "In Wisconsin". They described "Sooner or Later" as "an oh-so-smooth survey of a top-drawer sentimental". They also wrote, "Sound is the kind of Mathis that makes it." The editors of Billboard gave the song four out of five stars.

== Charts ==
Weekly chart performance for "Sooner or Later"
Chart (1963)	Peak position
US Billboard Hot 100	84
US Looking Ahead (Cash Box)	5
