= Wrong for Each Other =

- Norwegian release picture sleeve

Single by Andy Williams
- B-side: "Madrigal"
- Released: April 1964
- Genre: Easy Listening
- Length: 2:18
- Label: Columbia Records 43015
- Songwriters: Doc Pomus, Mort Shuman
- Producer: Robert Mersey

Andy Williams singles chronology
"Charade" (1964)	"Wrong for Each Other" (1964)	"On the Street Where You Live" (1964)

"Wrong for Each Other" is a song written by Doc Pomus and Mort Shuman and performed by Andy Williams. ( En France Vic Laurens enregistre en 1965 une version française, le titre en Français: Bien Qu'on S'aime ).The song reached #11 on the U.S. adult contemporary chart and #34 on the Billboard chart in 1964.
