= No Man Can Stand Alone =

- US 7-inch single

Single by Johnny Mathis

from the album Johnny
- A-side: "Every Step of the Way"
- Released: May 7, 1963
- Recorded: January 7, 1963
- Genre: Pop
- Length: 2:35
- Label: Columbia
- Songwriters: Jack Segal; Paul Vance
- Producer: Ernie Altschuler

Johnny Mathis singles chronology
"What Will Mary Say" (1963)	"Every Step of the Way" / "No Man Can Stand Alone" (1963)	"Sooner or Later" (1963)

Music video
- "No Man Can Stand Alone" on YouTube

"No Man Can Stand Alone" is a popular song written by Jack Segal and Paul Vance that was recorded by Johnny Mathis in 1963. It charted later that year.

== Recording and release ==
Johnny Mathis recorded "No Man Can Stand Alone" for his album Johnny on January 7, 1963, with an orchestra conducted by Don Costa. It was produced by Ernie Altschuler and released as a single four months later, on May 7.

== Chart performance ==
"No Man Can Stand Alone" peaked at number 5 on the pop chart in the Philippines.

== Critical reception ==
In their review column, the editors of Cash Box magazine featured the single as their Pick of the Week, which was their equivalent to a letter grade of A for both "No Man Can Stand Alone" and its A-side, "Every Step of the Way". They combined their comments for both songs, writing, "Warbler's current chart streak can be extended with either ends of his latest singles outing. Both items express side-by-side sentiments in a class ballad manner, the kind of material the performer is completely at home with."

== Charts ==
Weekly chart performance for "No Man Can Stand Alone"
Chart (1963)	Peak position
Philippines	5
