= I'll Search My Heart =

- US 7-inch single

Single by Johnny Mathis

from the album I'll Search My Heart and Other Great Hits
- B-side: "All the Sad Young Men"
- Released: November 5, 1963
- Recorded: August 9, 1962
- Genre: Pop
- Length: 3:05
- Label: Columbia
- Songwriters: Allyn Ferguson; Ernie Richman; Neil Weston
- Producer: Ernie Altschuler

Johnny Mathis singles chronology
"Come Back" / "Your Teenage Dreams" (1963)	"I'll Search My Heart" (1963)	"The Little Drummer Boy" (1963)

Music video
- "I'll Search My Heart" on YouTube

"I'll Search My Heart" is a popular song written by Allyn Ferguson, Ernie Richman, and Neil Weston that was recorded by Johnny Mathis in 1962. It charted in 1963.

== Recording and release ==
Johnny Mathis recorded "I'll Search My Heart" on August 9, 1962, with an orchestra conducted by Don Costa. It was produced by Ernie Altschuler and released as a single 15 months later, on November 5, 1963.

== Chart performance ==
"I'll Search My Heart" debuted on the Billboard Hot 100 in the issue of the magazine dated December 14, 1963, and peaked at number 90 two weeks later, the week ending December 28. It spent four weeks on the chart. It reached number 11 on Cash Box magazine's Looking Ahead chart, which was described as a "compilation, in order of strength, of up and coming records showing signs of breaking into The Cash Box Top 100".

== Critical reception ==
In their review column, the editors of Cash Box magazine featured the single as one of their Best Bets, which was their equivalent to a letter grade of A for "I'll Search My Heart". They wrote that it was "a very pleasing ballad stand. A chorus adds a Frank Sinatra-Pied Pipers-like touch to the take." The editors of Billboard gave the song four stars.

== Charts ==
Weekly chart performance for "I'll Search My Heart"
Chart (1963-1964)	Peak position
US Billboard Hot 100	90
US Looking Ahead (Cash Box)	11
