= Johnny (Johnny Mathis album) =

Studio album by Johnny Mathis
- Released: July 15, 1963
- Recorded: January 3, 1963; January 7–8, 1963
- Studio: CBS 30th Street Studio; New York, NY
- Genre: Vocal
- Length: 39:12
- Label: Columbia
- Producer: Ernie Altschuler

Johnny Mathis chronology
Johnny's Newest Hits (1963)	Johnny (1963)	Sounds of Christmas (1963)

Johnny is an album by American pop singer Johnny Mathis that was released on July 15, 1963, by Columbia Records and later described on Allmusic as "a nice blend of standards, show tunes and then-new compositions."

The LP debuted on Billboard magazine's album chart in the issue dated August 24, 1963, and remained there for 27 weeks, during which time it got as high as number 20. it also debuted on the Cashbox albums chart in the issue dated August 17, 1963, and remained on the chart for 36 weeks, peaking at number 13. One song from the album, "No Man Can Stand Alone", had been released on May 7 of that year as the B-side of "Every Step of the Way".

This album was "remixed and mastered from the original session tapes in 20-bit Super Bit Mapping" for its first release on compact disc on May 7, 1996. Johnny was also included in Legacy's Mathis box set The Voice of Romance: The Columbia Original Album Collection, which was released on December 8, 2017.

== Reception ==
Professional ratings
Review scores
Source	Rating
Allmusic	4.5/5 stars
Billboard	positive
The Encyclopedia of Popular Music	3/5 stars

Cub Koda of Allmusic described this Mathis outing as "one of his best… with Costa's arrangements fitting like a glove around Mathis's pipes." He also mentions some standout performances. "Everything on here works just fine, but pay special attention to 'The Most Beautiful Girl in the World', 'I Can't Believe That You're in Love with Me', Cole Porter's 'I Love You', and Duke Ellington's 'Jump for Joy'." The reviewer concludes, "No big hits on here, maybe, but a more solid track-by-track Johnny Mathis album you'd be hard pressed to find."

Upon its release, the review in Billboard was more focused upon his switch from Columbia to Mercury Records. "Mathis has departed the label, but his memory (in terms of sales and dollars and cents) is likely to linger on with this latest grouping, done up to Don Costa's slick arrangements."

Cashbox notes Don Costa "has created some fresh full-bodied arrangements tailor-made for [Mathis'] rich swingin' style."

Variety wrote in their review stated "Don Coasta has supplied the arrangements for this one and they all fit neatly into Mathis' smooth and easy vocal flow."

American Record Guide described the album as "one of great sensitivity and youth."

== Track listing ==
=== Side one ===
1. "Easy Does It" (Kenny Jacobson, Rhoda Roberts) – 2:08
2. "The Most Beautiful Girl in the World" from Jumbo (Lorenz Hart, Richard Rodgers) – 3:45
3. "Miracles" (Bart Howard) – 2:51
4. "(Ah, the Apple Trees) When the World Was Young" (M. Phillippe-Gérard, Johnny Mercer) – 3:47
5. "Never Never Land" from Peter Pan (Betty Comden, Adolph Green, Jule Styne) – 4:01
6. "Poor Butterfly" from the musical The Big Show (John Golden, Raymond Hubbell) – 4:15

=== Side two ===
1. "Jump for Joy" (Duke Ellington, Sid Kuller, Paul Francis Webster) – 2:15
2. "Joey, Joey, Joey" from The Most Happy Fella (Frank Loesser) – 3:56
3. "I Can't Believe That You're in Love with Me" (Clarence Gaskill, Jimmy McHugh) – 3:00
4. "I Love You" from Mexican Hayride (Cole Porter) – 3:27
5. "Weaver of Dreams" (Jack Elliott, Victor Young) – 3:13
6. "No Man Can Stand Alone" (Jack Segal, Paul Vance) – 2:35

== Charts ==
Chart (1963)	Peak position
US Top LPs (Billboard)	20
US Cash Box	13

== Recording dates ==
From the liner notes for The Voice of Romance: The Columbia Original Album Collection:

- January 3, 1963 – "I Can't Believe That You're in Love With Me", "I Love You", "Miracles", "Poor Butterfly"
- January 7, 1963 – "(Ah, the Apple Trees) When the World Was Young", "Joey, Joey, Joey", "The Most Beautiful Girl in the World", "No Man Can Stand Alone", "Weaver of Dreams"
- January 8, 1963 – "Easy Does It", "Jump for Joy", "Never Never Land"

== Personnel ==
=== Original album ===
- Johnny Mathis – vocals
- Ernie Altschuler – producer
- Don Costa – arranger and conductor
- Ted Brosman – recording engineer
- Frank Laico – recording engineer
- Robert Waller – recording engineer
- Ralph Cowan – cover painting

=== 1996 CD reissue ===
- Didier C. Deutsch – producer; liner notes
- Thomas Ruff – remixing, mastering
- Adam Block – project director
- Joy Gilbert – product manager
- Lisa Sparagano – design
- Hope Chasin – packaging manager
- Sony Music Photo Library – photos
- Remixed and mastered at Sony Music Studios, New York

== Bibliography ==
- Whitburn, Joel (2010), Joel Whitburn Presents Top Pop Albums, Seventh Edition, Record Research Inc., ISBN 0-89820-183-7
- Hoffmann, Frank W (1988), The Cash box album charts, 1955-1974, Scarecrow Press, ISBN 0-810-82005-6
