= Your Teenage Dreams =

- US 7-inch single

Single by Johnny Mathis
- A-side: "Come Back"
- Released: September 1963
- Recorded: 1963
- Genre: Pop
- Length: 2:40
- Label: Mercury
- Songwriter: Bobby Worth

Johnny Mathis singles chronology
"Sooner or Later" (1963)	"Come Back" / "Your Teenage Dreams" (1963)	"I'll Search My Heart" (1963)

Music video
- "Your Teenage Dreams" on YouTube

"Your Teenage Dreams" is a popular song written by Bobby Worth that was recorded by Johnny Mathis in 1963. It charted later that year.

== Background and recording ==
In May 1963 Johnny Mathis signed to record for Mercury Records after his contract with Columbia expired in July. The deal included the creation of an imprint for Mathis to record under, Global Records, that would lease his recordings to Mercury. He recorded "Your Teenage Dreams" and its A-side, "Come Back", for Mercury with an orchestra conducted by arranger Don Costa. The only production credit provided on the original 7-inch single reads, "Vocal Produced by Global Records, Inc.".

== Chart performance ==
"Your Teenage Dreams" debuted on the Billboard Hot 100 in the issue of the magazine dated October 12, 1963, and peaked at number 68 five weeks later, in the November 16 issue. The song was on the Hot 100 for seven weeks. On the magazine's Easy Listening chart, it got as high as number 19. It reached number 69 on Cash Box magazine's best seller list and number 90 on the Top 100 Pop Sales and Performance chart in Music Vendor magazine.

== Critical reception ==
In their review column, the editors of Cash Box featured the single as a Pick of the Week, which was their equivalent to a letter grade of A for both "Your Teenage Dreams" and "Come Back". They wrote that on "Your Teenage Dreams" "he tenderly displays his ever-winning ballad stylings". The editors of Billboard categorized the single as a "Spotlight Winner", one of the best of the week's new releases.

== Availability ==
"Come Back" and "Your Teenage Dreams" were not included on the Singles and Unreleased discs in the 2014 Mathis box set The Complete Global Albums Collection.

== Charts ==
Weekly chart performance for "Your Teenage Dreams"
Chart (1963)	Peak position
US Billboard Easy Listening	19
US Billboard Hot 100	68
US Top 100 Best Selling Tunes on Records (Cash Box)	50
US Top 100 Pop Sales and Performance (Music Vendor)	90

== Bibliography ==
- Whitburn, Joel (2012), Joel Whitburn's Hit Records 1954-1982, Record Research Inc., ISBN 978-0-89820-200-7
- Whitburn, Joel (2014), Joel Whitburn's Cash Box Pop Hits 1952-1996, Record Research Inc., ISBN 978-0-89820-209-0
