= Come Back (Johnny Mathis song) =

- US 7-inch single

Single by Johnny Mathis
- B-side: "Your Teenage Dreams"
- Released: September 1963
- Recorded: 1963
- Genre: Pop
- Length: 2:02
- Label: Mercury
- Songwriters: Eddie Snyder; Paul Vance

Johnny Mathis singles chronology
"Sooner or Later" (1963)	"Come Back" / "Your Teenage Dreams" (1963)	"I'll Search My Heart" (1963)

Music video
- "Come Back" on YouTube

"Come Back" is a popular song written by Eddie Snyder and Paul Vance that was recorded by Johnny Mathis in 1963. It charted later that year.

== Background and recording ==
In May 1963 Johnny Mathis signed to record for Mercury Records after his contract with Columbia expired in July. The deal included the creation of an imprint for Mathis to record under, Global Records, that would lease his recordings to Mercury. He recorded "Come Back" and its B-side, "Your Teenage Dreams" for Mercury with an orchestra conducted by arranger Don Costa. The only production credit provided on the original 7-inch single reads, "Vocal Produced by Global Records, Inc.".

== Chart performance ==
"Come Back" debuted on the Billboard Hot 100 in the issue of the magazine dated October 12, 1963, and peaked at number 61 four weeks later, in the November 9 issue. The song was on the Hot 100 for six weeks. It reached number 50 on Cash Box magazine's best seller list and number 47 on the Top 100 Pop Sales and Performance chart in Music Vendor magazine.

== Critical reception ==
In their review column, the editors of Cash Box magazine featured the single as a Pick of the Week, which was their equivalent to a letter grade of A for both "Come Back" and "Your Teenage Dreams". They wrote that "Come Back" "intros a new sounding Mathis in a pounding teen-directed cha-cha-twist". The editors of Billboard categorized the single as a "Spotlight Winner", one of the best of the week's new releases, and wrote that "Come Back" had "a big gutsy sound very much in the contemporary teen groove".

== Availability ==
"Come Back" and "Your Teenage Dreams" were not included on the Singles and Unreleased discs in the 2014 Mathis box set The Complete Global Albums Collection.

== Charts ==
Weekly chart performance for "Come Back"
Chart (1963)	Peak position
US Billboard Hot 100	61
US Top 100 Best Selling Tunes on Records (Cash Box)	50
US Top 100 Pop Sales and Performance (Music Vendor)	47

== Bibliography ==
- Whitburn, Joel (2012), Joel Whitburn's Hit Records 1954-1982, Record Research Inc., ISBN 978-0-89820-200-7
- Whitburn, Joel (2014), Joel Whitburn's Cash Box Pop Hits 1952-1996, Record Research Inc., ISBN 978-0-89820-209-0
