= I'll Search My Heart and Other Great Hits =

Greatest hits album by Johnny Mathis
- Released: 1964
- Recorded: 1959–1963
- Genre: Vocal
- Length: 35:05
- Label: Columbia
- Producer: Ernie Altschuler; Al Ham; Mitch Miller; Irving Townsend

Johnny Mathis chronology
Tender Is the Night (1963)	I'll Search My Heart and Other Great Hits (1964)	The Wonderful World of Make Believe (1964)

Professional ratings
Review scores
Source	Rating
Billboard	positive
The Encyclopedia of Popular Music	3/5 stars

I'll Search My Heart and Other Great Hits is a compilation album by American pop singer Johnny Mathis that was released by Columbia Records in April 1964 and gathered up five A-sides that reached the Billboard Hot 100, a corresponding B-side, and six songs that had previously been unreleased.

The album debuted on Billboard magazine's Top LPs chart the following month, in the issue dated May 9, and got as high as number 35 during its 16 weeks there.

== Reception ==
Billboard wrote, "A most attractive blend of voice and strings on the Mathis-Columbia package. The album contains fine singing on a number of telling but off-beat tunes for which the singer is noted."

== Track listing ==
=== Side one ===
1. "Starbright" (Lee Pockriss, Paul Vance) – 2:51
  - rec. 4/29/59, rel. 2/15/60; Billboard Hot 100: #25
2. "Every Step of the Way" (Robert Allen, Al Stillman) – 3:23
  - rec. 5/31/60, rel. 5/7/63; Billboard Hot 100: #30 Easy Listening: #10
3. "Wherever You Are It's Spring" (Arthur Hamilton) – 2:33
  - rec. 2/8/61; previously unreleased
4. "The Joy of Loving You" (Bart Howard) – 3:05
  - rec. 3/29/62; previously unreleased
5. "Each Time We Kiss" (Clyde Otis, Colin Towns) – 2:39
  - rec. 3/4/61; previously unreleased
6. "A Clock Without Hands" (Jerry Livingston, Paul Francis Webster) – 2:58
  - rec. 3/29/62; previously unreleased

=== Side two ===
1. "I'll Search My Heart" (Allyn Ferguson, Ernie Richman, Neil Weston) – 3:05
  - rec. 8/9/62, rel. 11/5/63; Billboard Hot 100: #90
2. "Sooner or Later" (Thomas Garlock, Alan Jefferys) – 3:19
  - rec. 8/9/62, rel. 7/30/63 Billboard Hot 100: #84
3. "My Favorite Dream" (Pockriss, Vance) – 2:55
  - rec. 10/9/61; previously unreleased
4. "The Best of Everything" from The Best of Everything (Sammy Cahn, Alfred Newman) – 2:45
  - rec. 9/8/59, rel. 9/28/59 Billboard Hot 100: #62
5. "What to Do About Love" (Leon Carr, Vance) – 2:28
  - rec. 5/31/60; previously unreleased
6. "All the Sad Young Men" (Livingston, Webster) – 3:04
  - rec. 3/29/62, rel. 11/5/63; B-side of "I'll Search My Heart"

== Personnel ==
- Johnny Mathis – vocals
- Ernie Altschuler – producer (except as noted)
- Al Ham – producer ("The Best of Everything", "Starbright")
- Mitch Miller – producer ("Every Step of the Way")
- Irving Townsend – producer ("All the Sad Young Men")
- M. Harkavy – cover photographic process

== Bibliography ==
- Whitburn, Joel (2007), Joel Whitburn Presents Billboard Top Adult Songs, 1961-2006, Record Research Inc., ISBN 0-89820-169-1
- Whitburn, Joel (2009), Joel Whitburn's Top Pop Singles, 1955-2008, Record Research Inc., ISBN 0898201802
- Whitburn, Joel (2010), Joel Whitburn Presents Top Pop Albums, Seventh Edition, Record Research Inc., ISBN 0-89820-183-7
