= Antoine-Elisée Cherbuliez (musicologist) =

Antoine-Elisée Cherbuliez (August 22, 1888 – October 15, 1964) was a Swiss musicologist, organist, and composer. A professor at the University of Zurich, he wrote the first book on the history of Swiss music, Die Schweiz in der deutschen Musikgeschichte, which was published in 1932.

== Biography ==
Antoine-Elisée Cherbuliez was born in Mulhouse, Alsace on August 22, 1888. His early studies in music were with his grandfather, Adolphe Koekkert. He initially studied science at the University of Strasbourg (US); earning a diploma in engineering in 1911 and a doctorate in 1914. He also studied the organ at US with Albert Schweitzer. He pursued further studies in music at the Zurich Conservatory and the Conservatoire de Strasbourg. From 1913 to 1916 he studied music privately with Max Reger in Jena. He also studied with Siegfried Ochs in Berlin in 1916.

Cherbuliez began his career as an organist; serving in that capacity in the city of Chur. He concurrently worked as an academic at the University of Zürich where he was appointed lecturer in 1923. He later became professor and director of the musicological seminar in 1932, and reader in 1950. As a composer he wrote chamber music and choral works, but was primarily active as a musicologist and music historian. He was the author of several books; most notably the first comprehensive history on Swiss music, Die Schweiz in der deutschen Musikgeschichte (1932), and the first history on Swiss music teaching, Geschichte der Musikpädagogik in der Schweiz (1944), among others.

Cherbuliez wrote biographies on Johann Sebastian Bach, Frédéric Chopin, Edvard Grieg, George Frideric Handel, Joseph Haydn, Pyotr Ilyich Tchaikovsky, and Giuseppe Verdi. He also wrote journal articles, and penned monographs on several composers, including Ludwig van Beethoven, Wolfgang Amadeus Mozart, and Johannes Brahms. He also wrote texts on music theory, form, and structure.

Antoine-Elisée Cherbuliez died in Zürich on October 15, 1964.
