= Romantically =

Studio album by Johnny Mathis
- Released: November 18, 1963
- Recorded: February 26–28, 1963
- Genre: Vocal
- Length: 42:52
- Label: Columbia
- Producer: Ernie Altschuler

Johnny Mathis chronology
Sounds of Christmas (1963)	Romantically (1963)	Tender Is the Night (1964)

Romantically is an album by American pop singer Johnny Mathis that was released on November 18, 1963, by Columbia Records and was also the final original studio album recorded by Mathis for the label prior to his moving to Mercury Records. Mathis had recorded exclusively for Columbia from 1956 to 1963. After a brief stint with Mercury, he returned to Columbia in 1967. His first Mercury project, Sounds of Christmas, was actually released six weeks before this one, on October 4.

Romantically made its first appearance on Billboard magazine's album chart in the issue dated December 28, 1963, and peaked at number 23 over the course of 27 weeks. it debuted on the Cashbox albums chart in the issue dated December 21, 1963, remaining on that chart for a total of 34 weeks and hitting a peak position of number seven.

The first compact disc release of the album came on June 9, 2009, when it was issued as disc two of a two-CD set that also included his 1962 LP Rapture. Romantically was also included in Legacy's Mathis box set The Voice of Romance: The Columbia Original Album Collection, which was released on December 8, 2017.

== Reception ==
Professional ratings
Review scores
Source	Rating
Allmusic	3.5/5 stars
Billboard	positive
The Encyclopedia of Popular Music	3/5 stars

Allmusic's Joe Viglione notes something aside from the label change about the place of this release in the Mathis catalog. "This album was recorded during the classic phase of the icon's career, his Top 40 hits coming to a halt around this time. There would be a 15-year gap before he would see that kind of attention again. And while all his releases throughout the 1970s have precision and value, there's something very special about the forces at play here.". He also mentions that the singer's voice "works very effectively on 'Hi-Lili, Hi-Lo', 'Friendly Persuasion (Thee I Love)', and 'Autumn in New York'." Although he gives side two a mixed review, he does describe "In Wisconsin" as "perfect for any 'bachelor pad' compilation" and sums up side one as "just a lovely slice of orchestrated treasures."

Billboard offered a prediction. "Johnny Mathis fans will find this LP irresistible, as will the lovers of romantic ballads." They especially liked the selections here. "Each of the 12 songs are standard blockbusters—perfectly suited for Mathis."

Cash Box noted "The warm-voiced chanter includes some top Broadway show tunes along with some melodic standards for this session arranged and conducted by Don Coasta."

== Track listing ==
=== Side one ===
1. "Getting to Know You" from The King and I (Oscar Hammerstein II, Richard Rodgers) – 3:11
2. "Moonlight in Vermont" (John Blackburn, Karl Suessdorf) – 3:40
3. "Hi-Lili, Hi-Lo" from Lili (Helen Deutsch, Bronislaw Kaper)– 3:30
4. "Friendly Persuasion (Thee I Love)" from Friendly Persuasion (Dimitri Tiomkin, Paul Francis Webster) – 3:51
5. "Autumn in New York" from Thumbs Up! (Vernon Duke) – 4:50
6. "In Wisconsin" (Calvin Bostick) – 3:15

=== Side two ===
1. "All That Is Missing" (Eddie Snyder, Paul Vance) – 2:58
2. "The Sound of Music" from The Sound of Music (Oscar Hammerstein II, Richard Rodgers) – 3:22
3. "Theme from "Carnival!"" from Carnival! (Bob Merrill) – 2:33
4. "Too Young to Go Steady" from the musical Strip for Action (Harold Adamson, Jimmy McHugh) – 3:42
5. "It's Only a Paper Moon" from The Great Magoo (Harold Arlen, E. Y. Harburg, Billy Rose) – 3:53
6. "September Song" from Knickerbocker Holiday (Maxwell Anderson, Kurt Weill) – 4:07

== Charts ==
Chart (1963-1964)	Peak position
US Top LPs (Billboard)	23
US Cash Box	7

== Recording dates ==
From the liner notes for The Voice of Romance: The Columbia Original Album Collection:

- February 26, 1963 – "Autumn in New York", "Getting to Know You", "It's Only a Paper Moon", "September Song"
- February 27, 1963 – "Hi-Lili, Hi-Lo", "Moonlight in Vermont", "The Sound of Music", "Theme from "Carnival!""
- February 28, 1963 – "All That Is Missing", "Friendly Persuasion (Thee I Love)", "In Wisconsin", "Too Young to Go Steady"

== Personnel ==
- Johnny Mathis – vocals
- Ernie Altschuler – producer
- Don Costa – arranger and conductor
- Tom Palumbo – cover photo

== Bibliography ==
- Whitburn, Joel (2010), Joel Whitburn Presents Top Pop Albums, Seventh Edition, Record Research Inc., ISBN 0-89820-183-7
- Hoffmann, Frank W (1988), The Cash box album charts, 1955-1974, Scarecrow Press, ISBN 0-810-82005-6
