= L'Orange (song) =

"L'Orange / Wot"

Single by Star Academy 3

from the album Les Meilleurs Moments
- B-side: "Wot"
- Released: December 2003
- Recorded: France, 2003
- Genre: Pop
- Length: 2:51
- Label: Mercury, Universal Music
- Songwriters: Pierre Delanoë; Gilbert Bécaud

Star Academy 3 singles chronology
"Saturday Night's Alright for Fighting" (2003)	"L'Orange / Wot" (2003)

Alternative cover
- Original version by Gilbert Bécaud

"L'Orange" is a 1964 song recorded by French singer and songwriter Gilbert Bécaud. It was covered in 2003 by the contestants of the French third version of the TV reality show Star Academy, and achieved a great success in France and Belgium (Wallonia), where it topped the chart for several weeks. As of August 2014, the song was the 20th best-selling single of the 21st century in France, with 560,000 units sold. In January 2004, thanks to the cover version, the original one by Gilbert Bécaud was charted for five weeks on the French Singles Chart, but peaked only at #89.

The B-side of the CD single is "Wot!", a cover version of Captain Sensible's 1980s hit.

In the video, the participants of the Star Academy 3 perform the song in a market, and Michal, the finalist, is accused of having robbed an orange.

== Track listing ==
CD single

1. "L'Orange" — 2:51
2. "Wot" — 3:07

== Charts ==
Chart (2003–2004)	Peak position
Belgian (Wallonia) Singles Chart	1
French SNEP Singles Chart	1
Swiss Singles Chart	6

End of year chart (2003)	Position
French Singles Chart	17
End of year chart (2004)	Position
Belgian (Wallonia) Singles Chart	26
French Singles Chart	24
Swiss Singles Chart	51
