= The Swinging Blue Jeans =

British Merseybeat band

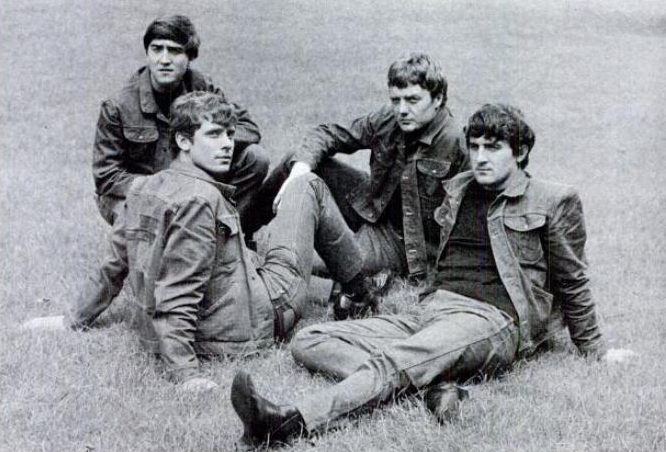
- The Swinging Blue Jeans in 1965

Background information
- Origin: Liverpool, England
- Genre: Merseybeat
- Years active: 1962–present
- Labels: His Master's Voice, Imperial, Capitol, Bellaphon, Columbia (EMI), RCA
- Members: Alan Lovell; Jeff Bannister; Graham Hollingworth; Roger Flavell
- Past members: Ray Ennis; Les Braid; Norman Kuhlke; Ralph Ellis; Terry Sylvester; Mike Gregory; Kenny Goodlass; Tom Murray; Michael Pynn; Hedley Vick; Garth Elliott; Colin Manley; John Ryan; Phil Thompson; Pete Oakman; Bruce McCaskill; Tommy Hughes; Spud Ward; Kenneth Metcalf; Arthur Griffiths; Norman Houghton; Jimmy Hudson; Paul Moss; John E. Carter
- Website: Official website

The Swinging Blue Jeans are a 1960s British Merseybeat band, best known for their hit singles "Hippy Hippy Shake" in 1963 and "Good Golly Miss Molly" and "You're No Good" in 1964. Their last charting single was "Don't Make Me Over" in 1966. The band's first stable line-up was singer/guitarist Ray Ennis, guitarist Ralph Ellis, bassist Les Braid, and drummer Norman Kuhlke. Ellis was replaced by Terry Sylvester (later of the Hollies) in 1966. From the late 1960s onwards, the Swinging Blue Jeans underwent many more line-up changes, which eventually left them with no original members by 2010.

== Career ==
The group had its origins in 1957, when Bruce McCaskill formed a jazz-influenced skiffle sextet called the Bluegenes. Besides guitarist/vocalist McCaskill, the original line-up also included banjo player Tommy Hughes, washboard player Norman Kuhlke, and oil drum bass player Spud Ward. There were a number of early personnel changes, as guitarist Ralph Ellis joined the band and Ward was replaced by Les Braid. Johnny Carter and Paul Moss entered the band to replace Hughes and McCaskill. They were a fully working band by 1962, playing skiffle and traditional jazz at venues in Liverpool and at the Star Club in Hamburg, Germany. Initially, the German audiences were unimpressed and booed them off the stage, leading the group to rapidly reinvent themselves as a rock and roll band, with a name change, to reflect their attire, to the Swinging Blue Jeans.

In 1963, the band, now a quartet of vocalist/guitarist Ray Ennis, guitarist Ralph Ellis, bassist Les Braid and drummer Norman Kuhlke, signed a recording contract with His Master's Voice with record producer Walter Ridley. The quartet's first recording, "It's Too Late Now", which was written by Ennis, made the British Top 30. In December 1963, a cover of the song "Hippy Hippy Shake" took the band to number two on the UK chart and established them as stars. They had a three-year spell of success, rising and falling with Merseybeat itself. The Swinging Blue Jeans had the standard Shadows line-up of two guitars, a bass guitar and drums and achieved local fame with their appearances at the Mardi Gras Club and the Cavern Club.

After a number of singles and two EPs during 1963 and 1964, their first album, Blue Jeans a-Swinging, was released in November 1964; a contemporaneous American LP composed of singles and EP tracks, Hippy Hippy Shake, included the instrumental "Wasting Time", which had no contemporary UK release.

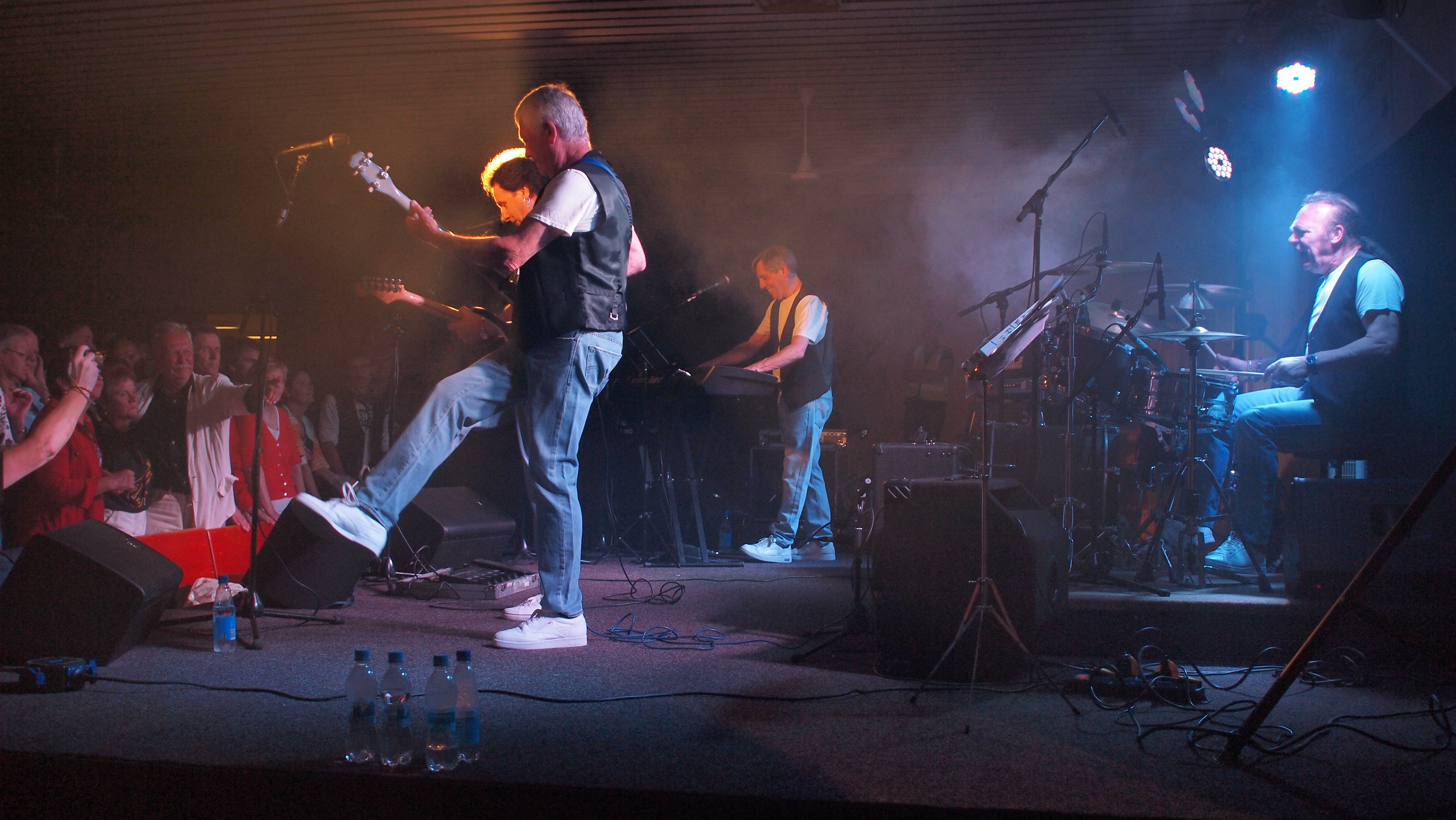
The Swinging Blue Jeans performing in 2013

In early 1966, Terry Sylvester from The Escorts replaced Ellis, who had shared songwriting duties with Ray Ennis. The band drifted into a middle of the road direction which failed to bring them any success. In 1967, the band's producer Ridley decided to try and transform Ennis into a solo star, cutting the disc "Tremblin'" with session musicians and backing vocals by Madeline Bell and Kiki Dee, but it was ultimately released under the band's name. Also in that year the band went to a five-piece unit with the introduction of another member from The Escorts, bass player Mike Gregory, with Braid moving on to keyboards. Sylvester left at the end of 1968 to replace Graham Nash in The Hollies. The band eventually retired to the cabaret circuit.

Drummer Ian McGee settled down in Stockholm and was replaced in 1980 by John Ryan (see also Liverpool Express). During the band's tour of Australia and New Zealand in 1983, John met his future wife and emigrated later that year. John arranged for his pal, Phil Thompson (Champagne), to take his place.

Early in 1999, Alan Lovell deputised for guitarist Colin Manley due to his deteriorating health. Manley died in April 1999 and Lovell became a permanent member of the band as lead guitarist/vocalist. When Les Braid died in 2005, Peter Oakman took over on bass guitar/vocals.

At the end of The Solid Silver Sixties tour in May 2010, Ray Ennis, the last remaining original member, officially retired, announcing his retirement on radio and to the general public. During and prior to the tour, Ennis offered Lovell the opportunity to continue with the band under the name "The Swinging Blue Jeans". Initially Lovell declined but subsequently registered the trademark of the name "The Swinging Blue Jeans" without Ray Ennis's knowledge. Ennis then decided to challenge Lovell for the ownership of the trademark but a Court decision ruled that Lovell had exclusive legal rights to the name. A subsequent appeal was lodged but was also dismissed. Meanwhile, Ennis came out of retirement to make occasional appearances with another band under the name "Ray Ennis's Blue Jeans". The Swinging Blue Jeans continue to perform today, with no original members, under the leadership of Lovell.

== Band members ==
=== Current ===
- Alan Lovell – guitar (1999–present)
- Jeff Bannister – keyboards, vocals (2010–present)
- Graham Hollingworth – drums (2010–present)
- Roger Flavell – bass (2023–present)

=== Former ===
- Norman Kuhlke – drums (1957–1969)
- Ray Ennis – lead vocals, guitar (1957–2010)
- Les Braid – bass, keyboards (1957–2005; died 2005)
- Ralph Ellis – guitar (1958–1966)
- Terry Sylvester – guitar, vocals (1966–1969)
- Mike Gregory – bass (1967–1972; died 2023)
- Kenny Goodlass – drums (1969–1973)
- Tom Murray – guitar, vocals (1969–1972)
- Michael Pynn – guitar, vocals (1972–1975)
- Hedley Vick – guitar (1975–1976)
- Garth Elliot – guitar, vocals (1976–1977)
- Colin Manley – guitar, vocals (1977–1999; died 1999)
- John Ryan – drums (1980–1983)
- Phil Thompson – drums (1983–2010; died 2018)
- Jim Rodford – bass (regular guest during 2005–2010; died 2018)
- Pete Oakman – bass (2005–2023; died 2023)

=== Early ===
- Bruce McCaskill – guitar, vocals (1957–1961; died 1993)
- Tommy Hughes – banjo, vocals (1957–1959; died 2013)
- Arthur Griffiths – guitar (1957)
- Norman Houghton – washboard (1957)
- Jimmy Hudson – double bass (1957–1958)
- Paul Moss – banjo (1959–1963)
- John E. Carter – lead vocals, guitar (1959–1961)

== Discography ==
=== Albums ===
- Blue Jeans a'Swinging (UK 1964)
- Hippy Hippy Shake (US 1964) – US No. 90
- Hippy Hippy Shake (Canada 1964)
- Live aus dem "Cascade Beat Club" in Köln (Germany 1965)
- Don't Make Me Over (Canada 1966)
- Hippy Hippy Shake (Sweden 1973)
- Brand New and Faded (1974)
- Best of the Swinging Blue Jeans (1978)
- Jump 'n' Jeans (1979)

=== EPs ===
- Shake with the Swinging Blue Jeans (UK 1964)
- You're No Good, Miss Molly (UK 1964)

=== Singles ===
Year	Single	Peak chart positions									
Year	Single	UK	AUS	CAN	FIN	GER	IRE	NL	NOR	SWE	US
1963	"It's Too Late Now" b/w "Think of Me"	30	—	—	—	—	—	—	—	—	—
1963	"Do You Know" b/w "Angie"	—	—	—	—	—	—	—	—	—	—
1963	"Hippy Hippy Shake" b/w "Now I Must Go"	2	11	2	2	9	2	5	1	1	24
1964	"Good Golly Miss Molly" b/w "Shaking Feeling"	11	32	12	16	35	—	6	8	5	43
1964	"Shakin' All Over" (Scandinavia and Finland-only release) b/w "Shake, Rattle and Roll"	—	—	—	7	—	—	—	—	9	—
1964	"You're No Good" b/w "Don't You Worry About Me"	3	67	—	27	—	—	—	—	18	97
1964	"Promise You'll Tell Her" b/w "It's So Right"	—	—	—	37	—	—	—	—	—	130
1964	"Tutti Frutti" b/w "Lawdy Miss Clawdy"	—	—	—	—	—	—	—	—	—	—
1964	"It Isn't There" b/w "One of These Days"	—	—	—	—	—	—	—	—	—	—
1965	"Make Me Know You're Mine" b/w "I've Got a Girl"	—	—	—	—	—	—	—	—	—	—
1965	"Ready Teddy" (Norway-only release) b/w "Lovey Dovey"	—	—	—	—	—	—	—	—	—	—
1965	"Ol' Man Mose" (Netherlands and Scandinavia-only release) b/w "Save the Last Dance for Me" / "It Isn't There"	—	—	—	—	—	—	—	—	—	—
1965	"Crazy 'Bout My Baby" b/w "Good Lovin'"	—	—	—	—	—	—	—	—	—	—
1966	"Don't Make Me Over" b/w "What Can I Do Today"	31	35	83	—	—	—	—	—	—	116
1966	"Sandy" b/w "I'm Gonna Have You"	—	—	—	—	—	—	—	—	—	—
1966	"Rumours, Gossip, Words Untrue" b/w "Now the Summer's Gone"	—	—	—	—	—	—	—	—	—	—
1967	"Tremblin'" b/w "Something's Coming Along"	—	—	—	—	—	—	—	—	—	—
1967	"Don't Go Out into the Rain (You're Gonna Melt)" b/w "One Woman Man"	58 (Note: Chart position is from the official UK "Breakers List".)	—	—	—	—	—	—	—	—	—
1968	"What Have They Done to Hazel" (as Ray Ennis and the Blue Jeans) b/w "Now That You've Got Me (You Don't Seem to Want Me)"	—	—	—	—	—	—	—	—	—	—
1969	"Hey Mrs. Housewife" (as the Bluejeans) b/w "Sandfly"	—	—	—	—	—	—	—	—	—	—
1970	"Happy" (as Music Motor) b/w "Where Am I Going?"	—	—	—	—	—	—	—	—	—	—
1973	"Rainbow Morning" b/w "Cottonfields"	—	—	—	—	—	—	—	—	—	—
1974	"Dancing" b/w "Baby Mine"	—	—	—	—	—	—	—	—	—	—
1974	"Hippy Hippy Shake" (re-recorded version; Germany-only release) b/w "Long Tall Sally"	—	—	—	—	—	—	—	—	—	—
1975	"Sunday Morning Sunshine" (Germany-only release) b/w "Ain't No Sunshine"	—	—	—	—	—	—	—	—	—	—
1976	"Hippy Hippy Shake" (re-recorded version; UK release) b/w "Baby Mine"	—	—	—	—	—	—	—	—	—	—
1976	"Like It Mean (Love Machine)" (as S.B.J. Band) b/w "Angel"	—	—	—	—	—	—	—	—	—	—
1980	"Whole Lotta Trouble" (Continental Europe-only release) b/w "You Win Again"	—	—	—	—	—	—	—	—	—	—
1980	"Tonight's the Night" (Germany and Portugal-only release) b/w "Bangin' in My Head"	—	—	—	—	—	—	—	—	—	—
1981	"Old Rock 'n' Roller" (Germany-only release) b/w "Angel"	—	—	—	—	—	—	—	—	—	—
1981	"Way Down Yonder" (Norway-only release) b/w "Angel"	—	—	—	—	—	—	—	—	—	—
"—" denotes releases that did not chart or were not released in that territory.

== See also ==
- List of bands and artists from Merseyside
- List of performers on Top of the Pops
- List of British Invasion Artists
