= Leib Glantz =

American musician (1898–1964)

- לייב גלאנץ
- Born: June 1, 1898; Kiev, Russian Empire (now Kyiv, Ukraine)
- Died: January 27, 1964 (aged 65); Tel Aviv, Israel
- Occupation(s): Cantor, composer, musicologist, writer, educator, Zionist leader

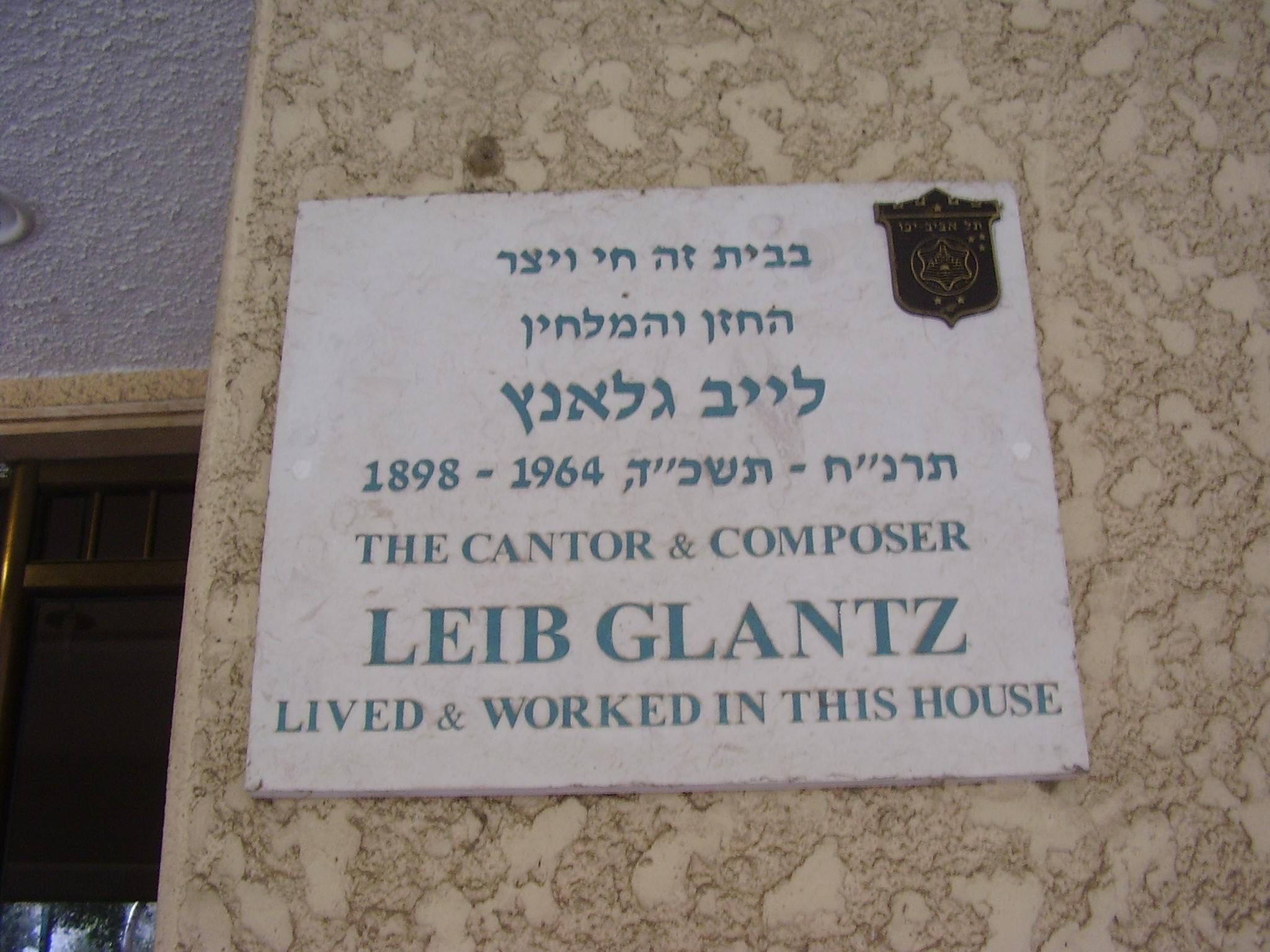

Leib Glantz (Yiddish: לייב גלאנץ; June 1, 1898 – January 27, 1964) was a lyrical tenor cantor (chazzan), composer, musicologist of Jewish music, writer, educator, and Zionist leader.

He was born in 1898 in Kiev, Russian Empire (now Kyiv, Ukraine). His father and both grandfathers were important cantors with Chassidic backgrounds. Leibele, as he was fondly nicknamed, was eight years old when he first appeared as a cantor in Kyiv. Word spread swiftly about the child prodigy, and he was engaged to appear in concerts all over Europe. In his teens he organized and conducted a large choir in his father's Talner Chassidic synagogue.

Glantz studied piano with the Ukrainian pianist and composer, Nikolai Tutkovski, and later graduated in piano and composition under composer Reinhold Gliere at the Kyiv Music Conservatory. In those years Glantz traveled numerous times as a delegate to congresses of the He'Chalutz movement and to World Zionist Congresses. He also assumed the position of chief editor of the Labor Zionist newspaper Ard Un Arbeit.

In July 1926, due to his intensive Zionist activism, and the growing antagonism towards the Jews by the Romanian regime in Bessarabia, Glantz left Eastern Europe. His plan was to immigrate to Palestine, which was then governed by the British, in order to join those of his Zionist friends who had already immigrated to Israel. However, he first traveled to the United States to record with RCA his compositions Shema Yisrael and Tal. He was invited to appear in New York, made a great impression and was offered a prestigious position as chief cantor of the Ohev Shalom synagogue in New York.

In America Glantz continued to develop his musical education, under the guidance of professor Aspinol, the vocal teacher of the opera singers Enrico Caruso and Benjamino Gigli.

In 1929 he made a series of LP recordings at RCA included Shema Yisrael, Tefilat Tal, Shomer Yisrael, Kol Adoshem, Lechu Neranena, Birkat Kohanim, Ki Ke'Shimcha, Ki Hineh Ka'Chomer and Ein Ke'Erkecha.

Glantz appeared in concert tours all over the United States, Canada, Mexico, South America, western and Eastern Europe, South Africa, and Palestine.

In 1936 Glantz married Miriam Lipton. They had two sons, Kalman and Ezra (Jerry).

In 1941, the family moved to Los Angeles, California, where Glantz served as Chief Cantor of Sinai Temple, and from 1949 to 1954 at the Sha'arei Te'filah synagogue. He was also professor of Jewish Music at the University of Judaism in Los Angeles.

In 1948 he lectured before the delegates of the First Annual Conference of the Cantors Assembly of America on the subject: How the different Jewish Nuschaot (Prayer modes) were created.

He articulated his musical theories in a famous lecture to the delegates of the 5th Convention of the Cantors Assembly in 1952—a lecture that created serious debate, as his ideas were considered a new path toward the analysis of the ancient Jewish prayer modes, the Nusach. In general, his research and theories established a historical continuity of Jewish music from its beginnings in the Holy Temples of Jerusalem. Glantz theorized that many centuries ago the Jewish people transformed certain Greek scales and modes, in the process creating original Jewish combinations. These became the foundations for the Cantillation of the Torah (Ta'ameiHa'Mikrah) and the Jewish prayer modes (Nusach Ha'Tefila).

Glantz continued to be active in the Zionist movement as one of its outstanding leaders. He was nominated to be a delegate at no less than eleven World Zionist Congresses from 1921 till 1961—the last two as a delegate representing Israel.

Glantz lived in Israel for the last ten years of his life (1954–1964). Many of his most important compositions were composed in this period of his life. In total, Leib Glantz composed 215 compositions of Cantorial, Chassidic and Israeli music.

In addition to his cantorial career, Glantz appeared in leading tenor roles in, among others, Alan Hovhaness' "Shepherd of Israel", Jacques Halevy's "La Juive", and Joseph Tal's "Saul at Ein Dor".

In 1959, Glantz founded the Tel Aviv Institute for Jewish Liturgical Music, and an academic level conservatory for training cantors—the Cantors Academy (Ha'Akademia Le'Chazanut). He was also a founding member of AKUM, The Israel Music Institute, The Israel Composers' League, and was a member of the editorial board of "Bat Kol."

Following Glantz's death on January 27, 1964, while in concert in Tel Aviv, the Tel Aviv Institute for Jewish Liturgical Music was transformed into the publishing organ of Leib Glantz's musical compositions, as well as his research and literary work. This body, in conjunction with the Israel Music Institute, has published seven books of Glantz's musical compositions, as well as the Hebrew book "Zeharim – In Memory of Leib Glantz."

In 2008, his son, Jerry Glantz, published a new book (in English): Leib Glantz — "The Man Who Spoke To God." This book includes two compact discs with Leib Glantz singing 30 of his important compositions.
