= Blue Jeans a'Swinging =

Studio album by The Swinging Blue Jeans
- Released: 6 November 1964
- Recorded: 1964
- Studio: EMI Studios, London
- Genre: Rock and roll, Merseybeat
- Length: 27:08
- Label: His Master's Voice
- Producer: Walter J. Ridley

The Swinging Blue Jeans chronology
Shaking Time (1964)	Blue Jeans a'Swinging (1964)

Professional ratings
Review scores
Source	Rating
Allmusic	3/5 stars
Hi-Fi News & Record Review	A:2
Record Mirror	4/5 stars
Uncut	1/5 stars

Blue Jeans a'Swinging is the first UK studio album by British beat band The Swinging Blue Jeans, released in November 1964 on His Master's Voice.

== Track listing ==
No.	Title	Writer(s)	Lead vocals	Length
1.	"Ol'Man Mose"	Louis Armstrong, Zilner Randolph	Ray Ennis	3:12
2.	"Save the Last Dance for Me"	Doc Pomus, Mort Shuman	Ralph Ellis	2:58
3.	"That's The Way It Goes"	Hank Marvin; Bruce Welch;	Ennis, Ellis	2:43
4.	"Around and Around"	Chuck Berry	Ennis	2:14
5.	"It's All Over Now"	Wally Whyton	Ellis	2:06
6.	"Long Tall Sally"	Enotris Johnson, Robert Blackwell, Richard Penniman	Ennis	1:50
7.	"Lawdy Miss Clawdy"	Lloyd Price	Ennis	1:46
8.	"Some Sweet Day"	Felice and Boudleaux Bryant	Norman Kuhlke, Ellis	2:12
9.	"It's So Right"	Les Braid, Norman Kuhlke, Ralph Ellis, Ray Ennis	Ennis	2:03
10.	"Don't It Make You Feel Good"	Welch, Marvin	Ellis	1:48
11.	"All I Want Is You"	Jim Ireland, John Chilton	Ennis, Ellis	2:16
12.	"Tutti Frutti"	Dorothy LaBostrie, Joe Lubin, Little Richard	Ennis	2:00

== Personnel ==
=== The Swinging Blue Jeans ===
- Ray Ennis – rhythm guitar
- Ralph Ellis – lead guitar
- Les Braid – bass, keyboards
- Norman Kuhlke – drums

=== Technical ===
- Walter J. Ridley – producer, photography
- John Chilton – liner notes
