= The Wonderful World of Make Believe =

Studio album by Johnny Mathis
- Released: July 10, 1964
- Recorded: February 7, 1964– February 10, 1964 at United Recording Studios; Hollywood, California
- Genre: Vocal; pop/rock
- Length: 39:14
- Label: Mercury
- Producer: Johnny Mathis

Johnny Mathis chronology
I'll Search My Heart and Other Great Hits (1964)	The Wonderful World of Make Believe (1964)	The Great Years (1964)

The Wonderful World of Make Believe is an album by American pop singer Johnny Mathis that was released by Mercury Records on July 10, 1964, and described by Greg Adams of Allmusic, who wrote, "The theme is fantasy, from imaginary locations ('Camelot', 'Shangri-La') to fanciful yearnings ('I'm Always Chasing Rainbows', 'When You Wish Upon a Star') to vague, idealized realms ('Beyond the Sea', 'Beyond the Blue Horizon')."

The album debuted on Billboard magazine's Top LP's chart in the issue dated July 25, 1964, and reached number 75 during its 10 weeks there. it also debuted on the Cashbox albums chart in the issue dated July 4, 1964, and remained on the chart for the totals of 15 weeks, peaking at number 26.

This project was released on compact disc for the first time as one of two albums in a two-CD set by Sony Music Entertainment on August 28, 2012, the other album being Mathis's previous studio LP, Tender Is the Night. The Wonderful World of Make Believe was also included in Sony's Mathis box set The Complete Global Albums Collection, which was released on November 17, 2014.

== Reception ==
Professional ratings
Review scores
Source	Rating
Allmusic	3/5 stars
Billboard	positive
The Encyclopedia of Popular Music	3/5 stars

Adams contrasts the approach of this album to his singles of the period. "Mercury didn't tamper with Mathis's established style on this album (unlike his first singles for the label, which seemed geared toward a younger audience), so the arrangements are in keeping with his Columbia work, if a bit more swirly and ornate as the material seemed to require." He concludes that this project "is strictly an album effort -- no standout single tracks here -- but it's an enticingly dreamy effort and Mathis sings superbly."

Billboard especially appreciated the concept and team at work here: "A fine idea, beautifully performed by Mathis with able support from Allyn Ferguson's arrangements and Jack Feierman's orchestration."

== Track listing ==
=== Side one ===
1. "Camelot" from Camelot (Alan Jay Lerner, Frederick Loewe) – 2:50
2. "I'm Always Chasing Rainbows" from Oh, Look! (Harry Carroll, Joseph McCarthy) – 3:37
3. "House of Flowers" from House of Flowers (Harold Arlen, Truman Capote) – 3:36
4. "Beyond the Sea" (Jack Lawrence, Charles Trenet) – 3:25
5. "Sky Full of Rainbows" (Bart Howard) – 3:09
6. "Sands of Time" from Kismet (George Forrest, Robert Wright) – 3:11

=== Side two ===
1. "Shangri-La" (Matty Malneck, Robert Maxwell, Carl Sigman) – 3:30
2. "Alice in Wonderland" from Alice in Wonderland (Bob Hilliard, Sammy Fain) – 2:46
3. "Dream, Dream, Dream" (Jimmy McHugh, Mitchell Parish) – 3:09
4. "The World of Make-Believe" (Jay Livingston, Paul Francis Webster) – 2:43
5. "When You Wish Upon a Star" from Pinocchio (Leigh Harline, Ned Washington) – 4:21
6. "Beyond the Blue Horizon" from Monte Carlo (Leo Robin, Richard Whiting) – 2:57

== Recording dates ==
- February 7, 1964: "Alice in Wonderland", "Sky Full of Rainbows", "The World of Make-Believe"
- February 8, 1964: "Beyond the Sea", "House of Flowers", "I'm Always Chasing Rainbows", "Shangri-La", "When You Wish Upon a Star"
- February 10, 1964: "Beyond the Blue Horizon", "Camelot", "Dream, Dream, Dream", "Sands of Time"

== Personnel ==
- Johnny Mathis – vocals; producer
- Allyn Ferguson – arranger
- Jack Feierman – conductor
- Bill Putnam – recording engineer
- Paul Francis Webster – liner notes

== Bibliography ==
- Whitburn, Joel (2010), Joel Whitburn Presents Top Pop Albums, Seventh Edition, Record Research Inc., ISBN 978-0-89820-183-3
- Hoffmann, Frank W (1988), The Cash box album charts, 1955-1974, Scarecrow Press, ISBN 0-810-82005-6
