= Every Step of the Way (song) =

- US 7-inch single

Single by Johnny Mathis

from the album I'll Search My Heart and Other Great Hits
- B-side: "No Man Can Stand Alone"
- Released: May 7, 1963
- Recorded: May 31, 1960
- Genre: Pop
- Length: 3:24
- Label: Columbia
- Composer: Robert Allen
- Lyricist: Al Stillman
- Producer: Mitch Miller

Johnny Mathis singles chronology
"What Will Mary Say" (1963)	"Every Step of the Way" / "No Man Can Stand Alone" (1963)	"Sooner or Later" (1963)

Music video
- "Every Step of the Way" on YouTube

"Every Step of the Way" is a popular song with music by Robert Allen and lyrics by Al Stillman that was recorded by Johnny Mathis in 1960. It reached the top 40 in the US and the top five in Hong Kong in 1963.

== Recording and release ==
Johnny Mathis recorded "Every Step of the Way" on May 31, 1960, with an orchestra conducted by Glenn Osser. It was produced by Mitch Miller and released as a single three years later, on May 7, 1963.

== Chart performance ==
"Every Step of the Way" debuted on the Billboard Hot 100 in the issue of the magazine dated May 25, 1963, and peaked at number 30 five weeks later, in the June 29 issue. The song was on the Hot 100 for seven weeks. It reached number 40 on Cash Box magazine's best seller list. In Billboard's June 1 issue, it made its first appearance on the magazine's Easy Listening chart, where it spent six weeks and got as high as number 10. In August of that year it reached number five in Hong Kong.

== Critical reception ==
In their review column, the editors of Cash Box magazine featured the single as their Pick of the Week, which was their equivalent to a letter grade of A for both "Every Step of the Way" and its B-side, "No Man Can Stand Alone". They combined their comments for both songs, writing, "Warbler's current chart streak can be extended with either ends of his latest singles outing. Both items express side-by-side sentiments in a class ballad manner, the kind of material the performer is completely at home with." The editors of Billboard categorized the single as a "Spotlight Pick", one of the strongest of the new releases, and wrote, "A groove sound by Johnny Mathis and solid piece of material by Bob Allen and Al Stillman could turn this into one of Johnny's biggest this year. Warm chanting and lush backing with just a wee touch of country make this a very tasteful disking …."

== Charts ==
Weekly chart performance for "Every Step of the Way"
Chart (1963)	Peak position
Hong Kong	5
US Billboard Easy Listening	10
US Billboard Hot 100	30
US Top 100 Best Selling Tunes on Records (Cash Box)	40

== Cover version ==
"Every Step of the Way" was recorded by Dickie Rock and The Miami Showband and reached number one in Ireland in 1965.

== Bibliography ==
- Whitburn, Joel (2014), Joel Whitburn's Cash Box Pop Hits 1952-1996, Record Research Inc., ISBN 978-0-89820-209-0
