= La Pachanga (song) =

"La Pachanga" (The Party) is a 1959 song by Eduardo Davidson, which is considered the classic example of the pachanga genre. The song was premiered by the Charanga band of the flautist Melquiades Fundora in Havana. The lyrics include an invitation to the dance: "Señores que pachanga, me voy con la pachanga. Ay mamita que'pachanga, me voy con la pachanga."

== Versions ==
- Genie Pace, Capitol Records, 1961
- Hugo and Luigi and their children's chorus, 1961
- Audrey Arno in German, Decca Records, 1961
- Ann-Margret, 1961
- Celia Cruz, album Siempre Vivire, 2000
