= And Here She Is =

And Here She Is ... Ann-Margret

Studio album by Ann-Margret
- Released: 1961
- Genre: Jazz; pop
- Label: RCA Victor
- Producer: Dick Peirce

Ann-Margret chronology
And Here She Is ... Ann-Margret (1961)	On the Way Up (1962)

Professional ratings
Review scores
Source	Rating
AllMusic	2.5/5 stars
Billboard	4/5 stars

And Here She Is ... Ann-Margret is the debut album by Swedish-American actress and singer Ann-Margret released by RCA Victor in 1961. She was subsequently nominated for the Grammy Award for Best New Artist in 1962 and awarded Most Promising Female Vocalist in the Billboard Year-End rankings.

The liner notes of the album were written by her mentor George Burns, who wrote: "When Ann-Margret first walked on the stage with our Las Vegas show a few months ago, her ability to reach the audience was immediately apparent. Even before she opened her mouth, the audience was charmed by her natural beauty and poise. Then she sang, and the people were captivated ... you can't hardly beat that combination of talent and beauty."

Billboard rated the album as 4 stars, noting "here's a whole helping of the gal's unique style applied mostly to standards...the cover shows the gal in her leotard and red sweater in a series of colourful poses. Good, displayable item." In their review of the album, Cashbox noted that the singer "has a small voice but through a knowledge of vocal tricks and mannerisms she effectively displays a style that should appeal strongly to the pop market."

An expanded version of the album was released to streaming services in 2016 containing Ann-Margret's debut single, "Lost Love" and three other songs recorded in 1961 as bonus tracks.

Ann-Margret re-recorded "Teach Me Tonight" in 2023 as a duet with her State Fair co-star, Pat Boone, for her album Born to Be Wild.

== Track listing ==
Side one
No.	Title	Writer(s)	Length
1.	"Baby Won't You Please Come Home"	Charles Warfield, Clarence Williams	3:15
2.	"Bye Bye Blues"	Fred Hamm, Dave Bennett, Bert Lown, Chauncey Gray	1:50
3.	"Please Be Kind"	Saul Chaplin, Sammy Cahn	2:45
4.	"Chicago"	Fred Fisher	1:52
5.	"Teach Me Tonight"	Gene de Paul, Sammy Cahn	3:15
6.	"More Than You Know"	Vincent Youmans, Billy Rose, Edward Eliscu	2:26

Side two
No.	Title	Writer(s)	Length
1.	"Blame It on My Youth"	Oscar Levant, Edward Heyman	2:49
2.	"Kansas City"	Jerry Leiber and Mike Stoller	3:23
3.	"That's What I Like"	Bob Hilliard, Jule Styne	2:43
4.	"I Should Care"	Axel Stordahl, Paul Weston, Sammy Cahn	2:52
5.	"You're Nobody till Somebody Loves You"	Russ Morgan, Larry Stock, James Cavanaugh	2:53
6.	"Lovie Joe"	Joe Jordan	2:51

Bonus tracks (2016 digital Expanded Version)
No.	Title	Writer(s)	Length
13.	"Lost Love"	H. B. Barnum, Johnny Otis	2:55
14.	"(Hurrah For) La Pachanga"	Eduardo Davidson	2:24
15.	"Hideaway Heart"	Burt Bacharach, Hal David	2:00
16.	"I Ain't Got Nobody (And Nobody Cares For Me)"	Spencer Williams, Roger A. Graham	2:28

== Personnel ==
- Ann-Margret – vocals
- Marty Paich – arrangements, conductor
- Joe Mondragon – bass
- Mel Lewis – drums
- Bill Pitman – guitar
- Jimmy Rowles – piano
- Conte Candoli, Don Fagerquist, Jack Sheldon, Plas Johnson, Stu Williamson – trumpets
