= Genie Pace =

American singer

Genie Pace was an American jazz and pop singer of the late 1950s and early 1960s. She and Doris Allen were signed by newly independent New York label Jade Records after its establishment.

Pace was born in New York City. A roller derby player, she played for the New York Chiefs and Brooklyn Red Devils.

Her first album Love in a Midnight Mood album on Jade was followed later the same year by a second album Here's Genie on Bright Records. In 1960 she released the single Just Counting Stars In 1961, she was signed to Capitol Records, and at the height of the Pachanga dance craze in the US, released a version of Eduardo Davidson's archetypical Pachanga tune, La Pachanga. At the same time, other versions appeared by Hugo and Luigi and their children's chorus and in Europe by Audrey Arno.

== Recordings ==
Genie Pace recorded only two albums, Love In A Midnight Mood on the small Jade Records label in 1956, and Here's Genie for the Bright Records label in 1957. She also recorded an EP in 1961 for Capitol Records called La Pachanga, which at the time was a current dance craze.

== Studio albums ==
Recorded	Album Title	Label	Catalogue No.	Release
1956	Love In A Midnight Mood	Jade Records	JLP-1001	LP
1957	Here's Genie	Bright Records	BRLP-1001	
1961	La Pachanga	Capitol Records	EAP 1-20176	EP

== Singles ==
Recorded	Title	Label	Catalogue No.
1956	Ballin' The Jack Twist/I'll Never Be Free	Jade Records	J-1001 A/J1001-B
	It Isn't So/51st And Broadway		ZTSP-25834/ZTSP-25835
	Storyland/A Kiss In A Bottle		J-103
1957	Whispering Breeze/Lonesome Road		ZTSP-26077/ZTSP-26078
	Roaming Gigolo/Under The Full Moon		ZTSP-26079/ZTSP-26080
1960	Just Counting Stars/Night Falls	Derby Records	DER-10013/DER-10014
1961	La Pachanga/Somebody Else Is Taking My Place	Capitol Records	23505/23527

== Reactions ==
Billboard covered several of Pace's recordings. It rated Just Counting Stars as having "Moderate Sales Potential", describing it as "Exotic ballad with Latin beat is chanted with rich sincerity." "La Pachanga" was listed by Billboard as first on its list of "Pick Hits" (songs which its editors predicted would likely become hits) on March 20, 1960.

"I'll Never be Free" and "Rolling the Jack Twist" were also deemed "Moderate Sales Potential".
