= Born to Be Wild (Ann-Margret album) =

Born to be Wild

Studio album by Ann-Margret
- Released: April 14, 2023
- Genre: Rock, Rock and Roll, Pop
- Label: Cleopatra
- Producer: Jürgen Engler, Adam Hamilton, Danny B. Harvey

Ann-Margret chronology
God is Love: The Gospel Sessions 2 (2011)	Born to be Wild (2023)

Born to Be Wild is a rock album by Swedish-American actress and singer Ann-Margret released by Cleopatra Records on April 14, 2023. It was her first album in over a decade and she was 81 at the time of its release. The album charted at number 93 on the Billboard Top Album Sales, the first time an Ann-Margret album had charted since Beauty and the Beard in 1964.

The album contains guest appearances from Joe Perry, Pete Townshend, Cliff Richard, The Oak Ridge Boys, and Pat Boone, among others. Ann-Margret had previously recorded "Teach Me Tonight" on her 1961 debut album And Here She Is ... Ann-Margret.

== Track listing ==
Born to be Wild by Ann-Margret track listing
No.	Title	featuring artists	Length
1.	"Rock Around the Clock"	Jim McCarty and Joe Perry	2:14
2.	"Bye Bye Love"	Pete Townshend and T.G. Sheppard	2:35
3.	"Son of a Preacher Man"	Brian Auger and Steve Cropper	2:12
4.	"Earth Angel"	Harvey Mandel and The Oak Ridge Boys	2:54
5.	"Why Do Fools Fall in Love"	Chip Z'nuff and Robben Ford	2:21
6.	"The Great Pretender"	Adam Hamilton, Danny B. Harvey and Paul Shaffer	3:02
7.	"Can't Take My Eyes Off You"	Cliff Richard and Rick Braun	3:46
8.	"Born to Be Wild"	The Fuzztones	3:45
9.	"Splish Splash"	Linda Gail Lewis, Mickey Gilley and The Rockats	2:33
10.	"Somebody's In My Orchard"	Don Randi	2:15
11.	"Teach Me Tonight"	Damiano Della Torre, Pat Boone and Rick Wakeman	3:03
12.	"Volare"	Lee Rocker and Slim Jim Phantom	2:31
13.	"Rockin' Around the Christmas Tree"	Sonny Landreth	2:05
Total length:			35:16

== Personnel ==
- Ann-Margret – vocals

== Charts ==
Chart (2023)	Peak position
US Top Album Sales (Billboard)	93
