= I Wanna Be Loved =

1933 popular song by Johnny Green

Song
- Published: 1933
- Composer: Johnny Green
- Lyricists: Edward Heyman, Billy Rose

"I Wanna Be Loved" (from the 1933 version of the 1931 revue Billy Rose's Crazy Quilt) is a popular song with music by Johnny Green and lyrics by Edward Heyman and Billy Rose, published in 1933.

== Recorded versions ==
The song is a standard, with many recorded versions:

- Billy Eckstine - Passing Strangers
- The song was included in the 1934 Vitaphone short "Mirrors" featuring Fred Rich and his Orchestra. It was sung by Vera Van in a scene where she dresses in an evening gown.
- The song was included in the 1934 Vitaphone Broadway Brevities short feature "The Song of Fame" sung by Ruth Etting in a nightclub scene.
- The song was recorded by The Andrews Sisters in 1950. Their version became a hit in the U.S., peaking at #3.
- The song was recorded by Russell Garcia (on his 1958 album The Johnny Ever Greens), starring Sue Allen on vocal.
- I Wanna Be Loved was the title track of an album by Dinah Washington with Quincy Jones and His Orchestra in 1962.
- Grant Green plays on the song on his 1963 album Am I Blue.
- George Maharis covered the song on his 1963 album Just Turn Me Loose!.
- Ann-Margret recorded the song for her 1963 album Bachelors' Paradise and again on her 1966 album Songs from The Swinger (And Other Swingin' Songs)
- Dean and Jean recorded the song in 1964 (U.S. #91).
- Mina covered the song on her 1969 album Mina for You.
- Jex Saarelaht and Kate Ceberano recorded it on their album Open the Door - Live at Mietta's (1992).
- Maria Muldaur performs the song on her 1999 album Meet Me Where They Play the Blues.
- In 2009 Mark Isham & Kate Ceberano recorded a version for their Bittersweet album.
- Kirby Lauryen performs a cover in the background of the club scene in Season 2, Episode 2 "A View in the Dark" of Marvel's Agent Carter.
- Elaine Dame covered this on her You're My Thrill album (2014)
