= Finley Duncan =

American record executive

Finley Duncan (died 1989) was a music industry executive associated with numerous independent record labels in Florida.

== Career ==
Duncan began in the music business as a jukebox operator. He distributed jukeboxes and was a nightclub owner on Florida's Emerald Coast. He also worked at a variety of small record labels for almost 30 years beginning in the 1950s.

=== Minaret Records ===
Duncan's labels included Minaret Records and Playground Records. Among the multiple artists he recorded: Kim Jones of Nashville (signed to Minaret in 1973), Len Wade and The Tikis, Reuben Howell, Doris Allen, Big John Hamilton, Leroy Lloyd and the Dukes, Count Willie and Jimmy Nelson. Other artists at his labels included Roger Benninghof, Tiny Watkins, The Krankies, Paul Martin, Patti Page, Genie Brooks, Johnny Adams, Josh Hamilton, and Trooper Jim Foster.

Allen's recordings were to be distributed by the Shelby Singleton Corporation. Herb Shucher founded Minaret before leaving to join Shelby Singleton's SSS organization, which took over the label a few years later in 1967. Jim Lancaster from Memphis worked with Duncan beginning in 1970. After Duncan died he rereleased many of his recordings, including on Soul Resurrection Volume One.

Duncan established Playground Records with Shelby Singleton in Valparaiso, Florida on the Florida Panhandle near Alabama in 1969. The studio recorded singles for Duncan's Minaret Records label Mike Quinn recorded with Duncan's Emerald Coast Records. Duncan's recordings did not sell well in their era, but many have been rerecorded and rediscovered among fans of the Southern genres. The Playground Recording Studio building on Westview Avenue in Valparaiso was later bought out of a bankruptcy sale by Tim Mosteferis, who moved his Music Mart store there in 2015 and rebuilt the studio; as of 2021 local bands used it to record and rehearse.
