= Fundora =

Fundora is a surname. Notable people with the surname include:

- Gabriela Fundora (born 2002), American boxer
- Iván Fundora (born 1976), Cuban wrestler
- Lazaro Fundora (born 1994), Cuban volleyball player
- Melquíades Fundora (1926–2009), Cuban charanga bandleader and flautist
- Sebastian Fundora (born 1997), American boxer
