= Big John Hamilton =

Big John Hamilton may refer to:

- Big John Hamilton (actor) (1916–1984), American actor
- Big John Hamilton (vocalist), American vocalist
