= Melquíades =

Melquíades is a Spanish given name. It is the Spanish form of the Greek name Melchiades, as in Pope Miltiades.

== Notable individuals ==
- Melquíades Álvarez (politician) (1864–1936), Spanish politician, founder and leader of the Reformist Republican Party
- Melquíades Morales (born 1942), Mexican lawyer and politician, affiliated with the Partido Revolucionario Institucional
- Melquíades Fundora, Cuban flautist
- Mel Martinez, (born 1946), American politician, former US Senator from Florida, Chairman of the Republican Party
- Mel Rojas (born 1966), Dominican baseball pitcher

== Fiction ==
- Melquíades Estrada, character in The Three Burials of Melquiades Estrada
- Melquíades, character in One Hundred Years of Solitude
- Melquíades Elquiza, character in The Cook of Castamar

== Other ==
- Melquíades, official name of exoplanet HD 93083 b
