= The Tikis =

American rock/soul group from Birmingham

Len Wade & The Tikis were a psychedelic garage rock band formed in Birmingham, Alabama by frontman Len Wade, whose musical background primarily comprised singing blue-eyed soul. Billy Self (born 1943 in Jacksonville, Alabama) played percussion and was also backing singer-songwriter inspired by surf rock and the precursor to garage rock, proto-punk, psychedelic and acid rock.

== History ==
The band grew out of the Bobby Mizzell Soultet performing soul music. Members Billy Self, Clyde Masters, Hayes Hopper and Len Wade played along the Florida panhandle before forming The Tikis in 1962.

The group became the house band at Club Lido in Fort Walton Beach, Florida, combining tight dance routines and horn lines. Drummer Billy Self founded the group as a beach-band image act. They were discovered by Finley Duncan, who ran Minaret Records and Playground Records.

=== Minaret years ===
Their first release was catalog number Minaret 111 in June 1963: "I Was Doin' Alright" and "My Bonnie" credited to Len Wade & The Tikis.

The label log shows 111 as "The Tikis - I Was Doin' Alright / My Bonnie - 1963". The next single was Minaret 118: "Travelling Shoes b/w Valley Of Tears in 1964".

=== Dial Records ===
By 1966 the group was on Dial Records, owned by Buddy Killen. Dial's history notes other artists who had singles during the Atlantic distribution period include Len Wade, the Tikis.

The group is noted as a psychedelic garage rock ensemble that had recorded as "Len Wade & The Tikis" and as "Billy Self and the Tikis." Len Wade is credited as Primary Artist on The Dial Records Southern Soul Story. After Dial, Wade recorded for United Artists and Ascot, then moved to Louisville, Kentucky to study music at Bellarmine College. In 2009 the band was inducted into the Birmingham Record Collectors Hall of Fame.

Billy Self in 1970 relocated to Nashville and founded a talent agency. Billy Self wrote the song Somebody's Son and credited himself as "Self," promulgating uncircumstantiated claims that he is a relative or the brother of Ronnie Self; there is no relation, as Ronnie's sole brother was named Sammy Ray.
