= Doris Allen (singer) =

American soul singer

Doris Allen was an American soul singer. She and Genie Pace were signed to the independent label Jade Records, started by former Bethlehem Records executive Jim Bright, in 1957. Billboard magazine referred to them as "thrushes". Allen went on to receive some acclaim as a singer of soul music with partner Big John Hamilton in the 1960s. Her songs include "A Shell of a Woman", "Kiss Yourself For Me", "Let a Little Love In", "Hanging Heavy In My Mind", "A Place in My Heart", "Them Changes", "Bright Star", "Candy from a Baby", "Treat Me Like a Woman", "Full Time Fool", and "Night Time Is the Right Time". Allen was also recorded on Emerald Coast Records (run by Finley Duncan) out of Fort Walton Beach, Florida.

== Career ==
Allen and Big John Hamilton covered the Buddy Miles song "Them Changes". Backed with "Bright Star", it was released on Minaret MIN-159 in 1970.

Allen recorded the single, "Hangin' Heavy in My Mind" which was released on SSS International 820. It was reviewed by Record World in the 12 December 1970 issue. Taking note of the fact that she had previously recorded with Big John Hamilton but this time she was on her own, the reviewer said that she was as soulful as any female singer around.
