= Minaret Records =

Minaret Records was a record label in Valparaiso, Florida. The label released recordings of Big John Hamilton. In 1973, Kim Jones of Nashville signed an exclusive recording contract with Finley Duncan (who started out as Jukebox operator) of Minaret Records. Her recordings were to be distributed by the Shelby Singleton Corporation. Herb Shucher founded Minaret before leaving to join Shelby Singleton's SSS organization, which took over the label a few years later in 1967.
