= Bachelors' Paradise =

Studio album by Ann-Margret
- Released: 1963
- Genres: Jazz; pop
- Label: RCA Victor
- Producer: Stephen H. Sholes

Ann-Margret chronology
| The Vivacious One (1962) | Bachelors' Paradise (1963) | Beauty and the Beard (1964) |

Professional ratings
Review scores
| Source | Rating |
|---|---|
| AllMusic | 3/5 stars |

Bachelors' Paradise is the fourth album by Swedish-American actress and singer Ann-Margret, released by RCA Victor in 1963. The album title is a pun based around the title song of the 1961 film, Bachelor in Paradise. Just two years prior, Ann-Margret performed the song at the 34th Academy Awards, the reception from which greatly boosted her career.

In their review of the album, Cashbox noted the singer "directs a kittenish, sexy voice at the bachelors at large as she purrs her way through a bag of standards and recent biggies...could be a brisk seller."

Ann-Margret re-recorded the track "I Wanna Be Loved" for the 1966 film, The Swinger and the accompanying album, Songs from The Swinger (And Other Swingin' Songs).

== Track listing ==
Side one
| No. | Title | Writer(s) | Length |
|---|---|---|---|
| 1. | "Bachelor in Paradise" | Henry Mancini, Mack David | 2:23 |
| 2. | "I Wanna Be Loved" | Johnny Green, Edward Heyman, Billy Rose | 2:47 |
| 3. | "Something to Remember" | Bud Freeman, Leon Pober | 2:29 |
| 4. | "Paradise" | Nacio Herb Brown, Gordon Clifford | 2:09 |
| 5. | "Lovin' Spree" | Joan Javits, Philip Springer | 2:53 |
| 6. | "You Took Advantage of Me" | Richard Rodgers, Lorenz Hart | 3:02 |

Side two
| No. | Title | Writer(s) | Length |
|---|---|---|---|
| 1. | "Let Me Entertain You" | Jule Styne, Stephen Sondheim | 2:24 |
| 2. | "Never on Sunday" | Manos Hatzidakis | 2:43 |
| 3. | "Romance in the Dark" | Big Bill Broonzy, Lil Green | 2:34 |
| 4. | "Call Me Darling" | Bert Reisfeld, Mart Fryberg, Rolf Marbot | 2:59 |
| 5. | "Hold Me," | Dave Oppenheim, Ira Schuster, Jack Little | 3:14 |
| 6. | "Mr. Wonderful" | Jerry Bock, George David Weiss, Larry Holofcener | 4:27 |

== Personnel ==
- Ann-Margret – vocals
- Stephen H. Sholes – producing
- Al Schmitt – engineering
- Hank Levine – conducting
