= The Swinger =

1966 American film by George Sidney

- Theatrical release poster
- Directed by: George Sidney
- Written by: Lawrence Roman
- Produced by: George Sidney
- Starring: Ann-Margret
- Cinematography: Joseph F. Biroc
- Edited by: Frank Santillo
- Music by: Marty Paich
- Production company: Paramount Pictures
- Distributed by: Paramount Pictures
- Release date: November 14, 1966 (New York City)
- Running time: 81 minutes
- Country: United States
- Language: English
- Box office: $700,000 (est. US/Canada rentals)

The Swinger is a 1966 American sex comedy film directed by George Sidney and starring Ann-Margret and Anthony Franciosa.

== Plot ==
Kelly Olsson is an aspiring writer, but Girl-Lure magazine keeps rejecting her racy submissions. Kelly decides to show the magazine boys what they are missing. She creates a fake identity for herself, pretending that a story about a young woman's wild ways is actually about herself.

Girl-Lure's lecherous editor, Sir Hubert, and his suave editor, Ric Colby, like the concept but aren't sure they trust the facts. Kelly tries to fool them by staging an orgy in her apartment building, asking friendly tenants to go along with her scheme. Sgt. Hooker of the vice squad does not feel she is fooling, however, and places Kelly under arrest.

Ric comes to her rescue. But when her hoax is revealed, he decides to get revenge by insisting that Kelly pose for a provocative layout for the magazine to prove she is as wild as she claims. By the time his car and her motorcycle meet head-on in the end, they're in love.

== Cast ==
- Ann-Margret as Kelly Olsson
- Anthony Franciosa as Ric Colby
- Robert Coote as Sir Hubert Charles
- Yvonne Romain as Karen Charles
- Horace McMahon as Detective Sergeant Hooker
- Nydia Westman as Aunt Cora
- Milton Frome as Mr. Olsson
- Mary LaRoche as Mrs. Olsson
- Corinne Cole as Sir Hubert's Secretary

== Production ==
George Sidney had previously made Bye Bye Birdie and Viva Las Vegas with Ann Margret. Sidney says the script for Viva Las Vegas had been written in eleven days in order to meet a commitment and The Swinger was similar. "We did the script in ten days," he said. "The studio had a commitment and needed to fulfil it... We devised a script that would give Ann-Margret an opportunity to show her facets. And boom, boom - off we went."

Filming started 13 December 1965 and finished by March 1966 after which Ann-Margret went to Vietnam to entertain the troops.

Sidney called the film "a wild, outrageous 'in', what's-happening-in-the-world-today kind of picture."

== Reception ==
Filmink called it "s a hopelessly confused comedy" which "feels like it was written by someone while drunk and Tony Franciosa is yet another male lead not worthy of the star" arguing "this film, a vehicle geared entirely around Ann-Margret’s talents, came close to killing her Hollywood career more than any other by virtue of its sheer incompetence."

== Soundtrack ==
Songs from The Swinger (And Other Swingin' Songs)

Studio album by Ann-Margret
- Released: 1966
- Genre: Jazz; pop
- Label: RCA Victor
- Producer: Al Schmitt, Neely Plumb

Ann-Margret chronology
Beauty and the Beard (1964)	Songs from The Swinger (And Other Swingin' Songs) (1966)	The Cowboy and the Lady (1969)

The five songs performed by Ann-Margret in the film in addition to the instrumental "Swinger's Holiday" were all included in her 1966 album, Songs from The Swinger (And Other Swingin' Songs) released by RCA Victor. Six additional were recorded for the release. The album also contains a re-recording of "I Wanna Be Loved" which had appeared on Ann-Margret's 1963 album, Bachelors' Paradise.

The title track was written by André Previn and Dory Previn and sung by Ann-Margret over the opening and closing credits of the film. Quincy Jones was also credited as an arranger on the album.

In their review of the album, Cashbox noted that the singer "sings songs from the flick 'The Swinger' and other pop goodies...the artist creates a solid sound on this album which could very well be a noise maker."

In 2023, Ann-Margret noted in an interview with Forbes that the track "More" was one of her and her husband Roger Smith's favourites that she had ever recorded.

== Track listing ==
Side one
No.	Title	Writer(s)	Length
1.	"The Swinger"	André Previn, Dory Previn	2:06
2.	"By Myself"	Arthur Schwartz, Howard Dietz	3:03
3.	"I Just Want to Make Love to You"	Willie Dixon	3:28
4.	"Swinger's Holiday"	Marty Paich	2:50
5.	"More"	Riz Ortolani, Nino Oliviero	3:08
6.	"Cute"	Neal Hefti, Stanley Styne	3:17

Side two
No.	Title	Writer(s)	Length
1.	"You Came a Long Way from St. Louis"	John Benson Brooks, Bob Russell	2:40
2.	"The Good Life"	Sacha Distel, Jack Reardon	2:39
3.	"After the Lights Go Down Low"	Phil Belmonte, Allen White, Leroy C. Lovett	3:54
4.	"I Wanna Be Loved"	Johnny Green, Edward Heyman, Billy Rose	2:55
5.	"Kelly's Dance"	Marty Paich	2:50
6.	"That Old Black Magic"	Harold Arlen, Johnny Mercer	3:35
