= Eduardo Davidson =

Cuban musician (1929–1994)

Eduardo Davidson (1929–1994) Was born Claudio Cuza on October 30, 1929, in Baracoa, Cuba and died June 10, 1994, in New York City, US. He is best known as the creator of the pachanga, style of music. His 1959 song "La Pachanga" hybridized Afro-Cuban Lucumí and Bembé rhythms from their Nigerian Yoruba traditions, pairing them with Brazilian Samba. Davidson also is credited with choreographing the original form of the Pachanga dance. The song La Pachanga debuted on May 21, 1959, on the CMQ television's musical program “Casino de la Alegria”. Davidson was a writer for the program and specifically wrote it for vocalist Ruben Rios and chose Orquesta Sublime to play the instrumentation. It was also first recorded by Orquesta Sublime with vocals by Ruben Rios. Though other sources incorrectly contend that José Fajardo's charanga band was the first to perform a pachanga. Fajardo, was critical to making Pachanga a mainstream success, composed many Pachanga orchestrations, and was forever associated with the Pachanga style of music.
