= Beauty and the Beard =

Studio album by Al Hirt and Ann-Margret
- Released: 1964
- Genre: Jazz
- Length: 32:36
- Label: RCA Victor
- Producer: Steve Sholes

Al Hirt chronology
Our Man in New Orleans (1963)	Beauty and the Beard (1964)	Sugar Lips (1964)

Ann-Margret chronology
Bachelors' Paradise (1963)	Beauty and the Beard (1964)	Songs from The Swinger (And Other Swingin' Songs) (1966)

Professional ratings
Review scores
Source	Rating
AllMusic	3/5 stars
Record Mirror	4/5 stars

Beauty and the Beard is an album by Al Hirt and Ann-Margret released by RCA Victor in 1964. The album was arranged by Marty Paich and produced by Steve Sholes.

The album reached No. 84 on the Billboard Top LPs chart in 1964 and #47 on the Cashbox Top 100 Albums.

Billboard magazine awarded the album 'Special Merit' in their review column, stating that the record was "a wild and woolly combination. Ann-Margret and Al Hirt dish out a togetherness-type swingers. Ann-Margret does the huffin' while Al Hirt does the puffin'...duo provides much listenable entertainment."

In their review of the album, Cashbox praised the album as "delightfully entertaining...the trumpeter also turns singer here as he and the lark give good humoured readings of "My Baby Just Cares for Me", "Everybody Loves My Baby" and "The Best Man" and nine other lively tunes. Some brisk trumpet rides by Hirt add colour to the session."

The album was reissued on compact disc in 2010 by Bear Family Records under the title Personalities - The Velvet Lounge. It contained three bonus tracks never before released.

== Track listing ==
Side one
No.	Title	Writer(s)	Length
1.	"Personality"	Johnny Burke, Jimmy Van Heusen	3:17
2.	"'Tain't What You Do"	Sy Oliver, Trummy Young	2:15
3.	"Bill Bailey"	Hughie Cannon	3:18
4.	"My Baby Just Cares for Me"	Walter Donaldson, Gus Kahn	2:11
5.	"Everybody Loves My Baby (But My Baby Don't Love Nobody But Me)"	Spencer Williams, Jack Palmer	2:18
6.	"Little Boy (Little Girl)"	Francis Henry, Madeline Hyde	2:16

Side two
No.	Title	Writer(s)	Length
1.	"The Best Man"	Fred Wise, Roy Alfred	3:16
2.	"Ma (He's Making Eyes at Me)"	Sidney Clare, Con Conrad	2:22
3.	"Mutual Admiration Society"	Harold Karr, Matt Dubey	2:43
4.	"Row, Row, Row"	Jimmie V. Monaco, William Jerome	2:24
5.	"Baby, It's Cold Outside"	Frank Loesser	3:33
6.	"Just Because"	Joe Shelton, Sydney Robin, Bob Shelton	2:43

Bonus tracks (2010 reissue)
No.	Title	Writer(s)	Length
13.	"Mack the Knife"	Kurt Weill, Bertolt Brecht	2:33
14.	"I Wish I Could Shimmy Like My Sister Kate"	Armand J. Piron	2:59
15.	"Mama's Gone, Goodbye"	Peter Bocage, Armand Piron	2:28

== Personnel ==
- Ann-Margret – vocals
- Al Hirt – trumpet, vocals
- Al Hendrickson – guitar
- Fred Crane – piano
- Lowell Miller – bass
- Jimmy Zitano – drums
- Red Norvo – vibraphone
- Eddie Miller – tenor saxophone
- Gerry Hirt – trombone
- Pee Wee Spitelera – clarinet
- Marty Paich – arrangements, conductor

== Charts ==
Chart (1964)	Peak position
US Billboard Top LPs	84
US Cashbox Top 100	47
