= Pachanga =

Musical genre that is a mixture of son montuno and merengue

- Stylistic origins: Son montuno, merengue
- Cultural origins: Cuba, 1959

Pachanga (Spanish pronunciation: [paˈtʃaŋɡa]) is a genre of music which is described as a mixture of son montuno and merengue and has an accompanying signature style of dance. This type of music has a festive, lively style and is marked by jocular, mischievous lyrics. Pachanga originated in Cuba in the 1950s and played an important role in the evolution of Caribbean style music as it is today. Considered a prominent contributor to the eventual rise of salsa, Pachanga itself is an offshoot music played by charangas. Very similar in sound to Cha-Cha but with a notably stronger down-beat, Pachanga once experienced massive popularity all across the Caribbean and was brought to the United States by Cuban immigrants post World War II. This led to an explosion of Pachanga music in Cuban music clubs that influenced Latin culture in the United States for decades to come.

== Music ==
Charanga is a type of traditional ensemble that plays Cuban dance music (mostly Danzón, Danzonete, and Cha cha chá) using violin, flute, horns, drums.

José Fajardo brought the song "La Pachanga" to New York in the Cuban charanga style. The orquesta, or band, was referred to as charanga, while the accompanying dance was named the pachanga. The similar sound of the words charanga and pachanga has led to the fact that these two notions are often confused. In fact, Charanga has a lot of different meanings; it can refer to having a party, a musical ensemble, or the rhythm itself.

Eduardo Davidson's tune, "La Pachanga", with rights managed by Peer International (BMI), achieved international recognition in 1961 when it was licensed in three versions sung by Genie Pace on Capitol, by Audrey Arno in a German version on European Decca, and by Hugo and Luigi and their children's chorus. Billboard commented "A bright new dance craze from the Latins has resulted in these three good recordings, all with interesting and varying treatments."

== Dance ==
As a dance, pachanga has been described as "a happy-go-lucky dance" of Cuban origin with a Charleston flavor due to the double bending and straightening of the knees. It is danced on the downbeat of four-four time to the usual mambo offbeat music characterized by the charanga instrumentation of flutes, violins, and drums.

=== Steps ===
A basic pachanga step consists of a bending and straightening of the knees. Pachanga is a very grounded dance, with the knees never completely straightening and an emphasis on weight and energy going into the ground. Body movement resulting from weight changes follows the footwork. With a bounce originating in the knees, the upper body will rock as body connectivity and posture are maintained. It mimics a basic mambo step in foot placement and weight shift while incorporating a glide on weight transfer instead of a tap. The shift in weight from one foot to the other gives the illusion of gliding, similar to a moonwalk.

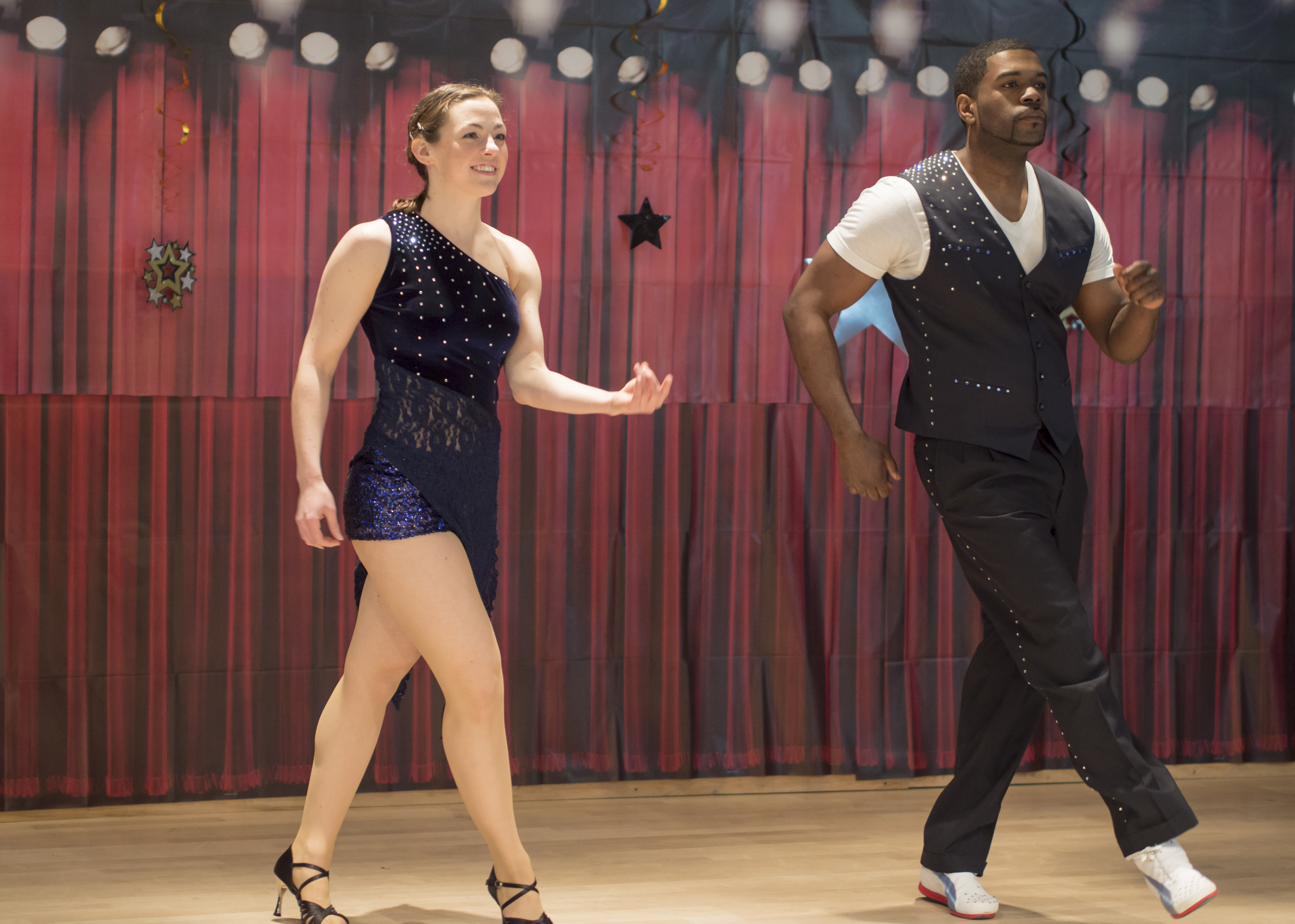
Salsa dancers performing a shine

=== Modern Pachanga ===
Pachanga dance today is mainly seen incorporated into salsa shines or footwork. “Shines” can refer either to a performance by a group of solo men or women without a partner, or a pause in partnerwork for each dancer to show off before coming back together. The term 'shine' originates from young African American shoe shiners who would dance for money. While it is not a very popular social dance, many salsa dancers incorporate pachanga movements into their choreography, especially in mambo or salsa on-2 routines. Although people traditionally learned pachanga from friends or family in social settings, as it was the only way to learn many Latin styles, instructors have adapted to a Western studio style of teaching. Pachanga is taught all over the world at different salsa events and congresses. As technology increases and economies and societies become increasingly global, the crossover of different cultures becomes easier, including the blending of different dance styles from all over. People worldwide can learn dances such as pachanga, as well as incorporate its movements into styles with which they are already familiar. Popular instructors include the “Mambo King” Eddie Torres, one of his students Eddie Torres Jr., and his former partner Shani Talmor.

== History ==
Though Pachanga was created in Cuba, it rose to popularity in the United States in the 1950s during a wave of Cuban immigration. America is where Pachanga truly became popular and known in the public consciousness and developed into the music, dance and overall influence that it is today.

=== Cuban immigration ===
The development of the style of music that came to be known as Salsa in the U.S. in the late 1960s relied heavily on the Latin music scene in New York City and more specifically the South Bronx. In the post World War Two era, New York city experienced a surge of Cuban immigration. During this time Cuba underwent several economic and social crises including the destabilization of international tobacco and sugar markets and civil upheavals that further disrupted the already fragile Cuban republic. As a result, tens of thousands of Cubans migrated to the U.S. hoping to find greater economic opportunities and more civil liberties, establishing sizeable communities in New Orleans, Tampa, and New York City. The start of the Cuban Revolution in 1953 only gave Cuban civilians more reason to flee the country, adding to the flood of immigrants to the United States.

=== Rise of Pachanga in New York ===
At the time, the South Bronx had large developments of affordable public housing where many Cubans and other Caribbean immigrants ended up finding a place to call home. In addition to housing, the South Bronx also offered a strong infrastructure for the growth of a culturally rich community. The Cuban communities that formed brought with them their own art and culture and in particular they brought with them Cuban music and dance. The Caribbean music scene in New York exploded along with the rise of Caribbean ballrooms, clubs and dance halls. These establishments featured all the popular Caribbean music styles of the era, beginning with the Mambo. The Mambo grew in popularity at an alarming rate sparking “Mambo mania” throughout the U.S. to the point that even mainstream musicians such as Rosemary Clooney and Perry Como were incorporating the sounds of Mambo into their pop music. The success that Mambo had in finding its way into the mainstream paved the way for other forms of Caribbean music to be successful. It wasn't long before everyone in New York was listening and dancing to Pachanga.

Two clubs in particular that are inextricably linked with Pachanga's development and popularity are the Triton After-Hours Club and the Caravana Club. The Bronx's Caravana Club is commonly thought of as the home of Pachanga. Opened in the summer of 1959, the Caravana Club instantly became a major hub for the Latin music scene in New York by presenting major bands every week. The clubs popularity truly rose after the live recording of Charlie Palmieri’s "Pachanga at the Caravana Club" in 1961 which cemented its reputation as the home of Pachanga. At the Triton Club on the other hand, Johnny Pacheco improvised a dance move known as the “Bronx Hop” which later became a major part of the Pachanga dance fad.

A group of patrons at the Caravana Club even formed a dance group named “Los Pachangueros” that performed across the city. At this time, a Pachanga dance craze had also struck the city with such popularity that countless articles about it made their way into mainstream American publications including The New York Times, El Diario and the specialized Ballroom Dance Magazine.
