= Ann-Margret =

American actress (born 1941)

- Ann-Margret in the 1960s
- Born: Ann-Margret Olsson; 28 April 1941 (age 85); Stockholm, Sweden
- Citizenship: United States (from 1949)
- Occupations: Actress; singer; dancer
- Years active: 1961–Present
- Spouse: Roger Smith (m. 1967; died 2017)

Ann-Margret Olsson (born 28 April 1941), credited as Ann-Margret, is an American actress, dancer, and singer with a career spanning seven decades. Her many screen roles include Pocketful of Miracles (1961), State Fair (1962), Bye Bye Birdie (1963), Viva Las Vegas (1964), Carnal Knowledge (1971), The Train Robbers (1973), Tommy (1975), The Return of the Soldier (1982), 52 Pick-Up (1986), Newsies (1992), Grumpy Old Men (1993), Grumpier Old Men (1995), Any Given Sunday (1999), Taxi (2004), and Going in Style (2017). Her accolades include five Golden Globe Awards, two Laurel Awards, two Photoplay Awards, an Emmy Award, a Hollywood Walk of Fame Star, as well as two Academy Award nominations and two Grammy Award nominations. Born in Sweden, Ann-Margret immigrated to the United States as a child.

== Early life ==
Ann-Margret Olsson was born on 28 April 1941, in Stockholm, Sweden, to Anna Regina (née Aronsson) and Carl Gustav Olsson, a native of Örnsköldsvik. The family moved to Valsjöbyn, Krokom Municipality, Jämtland County, Sweden in 1942. She described Valsjöbyn as a small town of "lumberjacks and farmers high up near the Arctic Circle". Her father had emigrated to the United States but returned to Sweden in 1937 and married Anna Aronsson. After Ann-Margret's birth, Gustav wanted to emigrate again with the family.

After World War II, his wife hesitated and Gustav emigrated alone, but was joined by his wife and daughter in 1946. In 1949, Ann-Margret became a naturalized American citizen.

Ann-Margret took her first dance lessons at the Marjorie Young School of Dance. She showed natural ability from the start, easily mimicking all the steps. Her parents were supportive, and her mother made all of her costumes by hand. To support the family, Ann-Margret's mother became a funeral parlor receptionist after her husband suffered a severe injury on his job. While a teenager, Ann-Margret appeared on the Morris B. Sachs Amateur Hour, Don McNeill's Breakfast Club, and Ted Mack's Amateur Hour. She continued to star in theater as she attended New Trier High School in Winnetka, Illinois. Two fellow movie stars, Charlton Heston and Rock Hudson, had graduated from the school many years earlier. She then attended Northwestern University for a brief time; In a September 1959 advertisement for Sheaffer pens, she appears as "Ann Margret Olson, freshman, Northwestern University."

In January 1960, she was a member of "Joy Ride," a touring ensemble sponsored by the Chicago USO. Its twelve performers—current and recent Northwestern University students—spent four weeks entertaining U.S. military overseas in Iceland and Germany.

Later in 1960, she and three young men from Northwestern formed a singing group, the Suttletones. The group appeared at Chicago's Black Orchid and The Mist nightclubs, then in Nevada's Elko, Reno, and Las Vegas at the Dunes hotel and casino in Las Vegas. The Dunes also headlined Tony Bennett and Al Hirt at the time. George Burns heard of her performance, and she auditioned for his annual holiday show, for which she and Burns performed a softshoe routine. Variety proclaimed that "George Burns has a gold mine in Ann-Margret... she has a definite style of her own, which can easily guide her to star status".

Ann-Margret said she dropped her last name before moving out to California because when you are an entertainer, "mean things" can be written about you and she did not want her parents to be hurt by anything written about her.

== Career ==
=== Music career ===
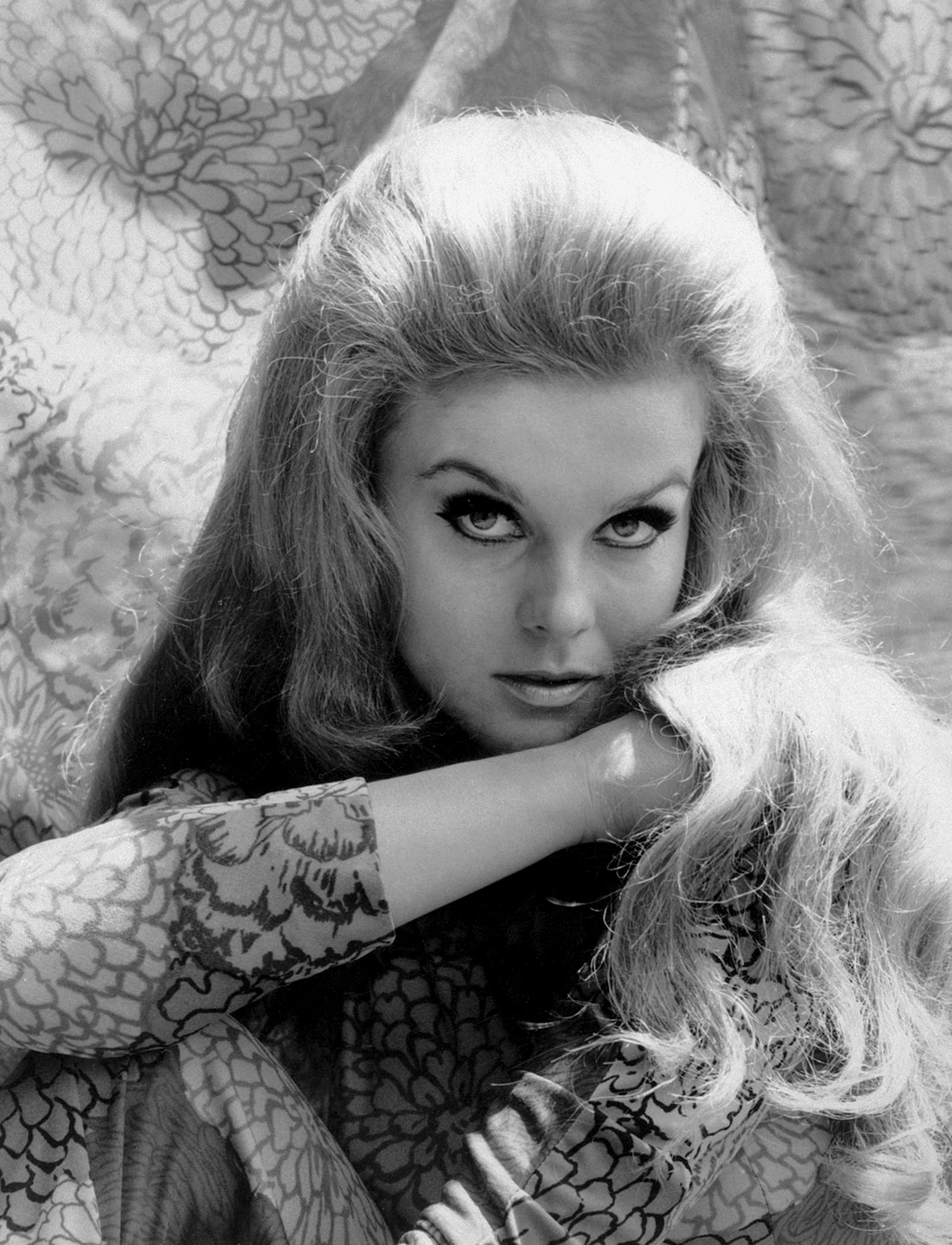
A 1960s publicity photo

Ann-Margret began recording for RCA Victor in 1961, first recording "Lost Love". Her debut album And Here She Is ... Ann-Margret was recorded in Hollywood, arranged and conducted by Marty Paich. Later albums were produced in Nashville with Chet Atkins on guitar, the Jordanaires (Elvis Presley's backup singers), and the Anita Kerr Singers, with liner notes by mentor George Burns. She had a sexy, throaty contralto singing voice.

RCA Victor attempted to capitalize on the "female Elvis" comparison by having her record a version of "Heartbreak Hotel" and other songs stylistically similar to Presley's. She scored a minor success with "I Just Don't Understand" (from her second LP), which entered the Billboard Top 40 in August 1961 and stayed six weeks, peaking at number 17; the song was later performed by the Beatles in 1963. In 1962, Ann-Margret was nominated for a Grammy Award for Best New Artist.

Her only charting album was Beauty and the Beard (1964), on which she was accompanied by trumpeter Al Hirt. Other career highlights included appearing on The Jack Benny Program in 1961 and singing the Bachelor in Paradise theme at the 34th Academy Awards in 1962. Her contract with RCA Victor ended in 1966. In 1963, Life Magazine mentioned that her recordings had sold in excess of half a million units.

In the late 1970s and early 1980s, she had hits on the dance charts, the most successful being 1979's "Love Rush", which peaked at number eight on the disco/dance charts. In 2001, working with Art Greenhaw, she recorded the album God Is Love: The Gospel Sessions. The album went on to earn a Grammy nomination (forty years after her first) and also a Dove Award nomination for gospel album of the year. Her album Ann-Margret's Christmas Carol Collection, also produced and arranged by Greenhaw, was recorded in 2004. 2011 saw the release of God is Love: The Gospel Sessions 2.

In 2023, she went back into the studio to record a full-length album of new recordings for Cleopatra Records. "Born to Be Wild" featured 13 covers including "Splish Splash", "Earth Angel", "Son of a Preacher Man", and a new take on "Teach Me Tonight" featuring Pat Boone. Other guest performers included Pete Townshend, The Fuzztones, Paul Shaffer, The Oak Ridge Boys, and more. The album was released on 14 April 2023, on vinyl, compact disc, and all streaming platforms. The album charted at number 93 on the Billboard Top Album Sales, the first time an Ann-Margret album had charted since Beauty and the Beard in 1964.

=== Rapid rise to Hollywood stardom (1961–1964) ===
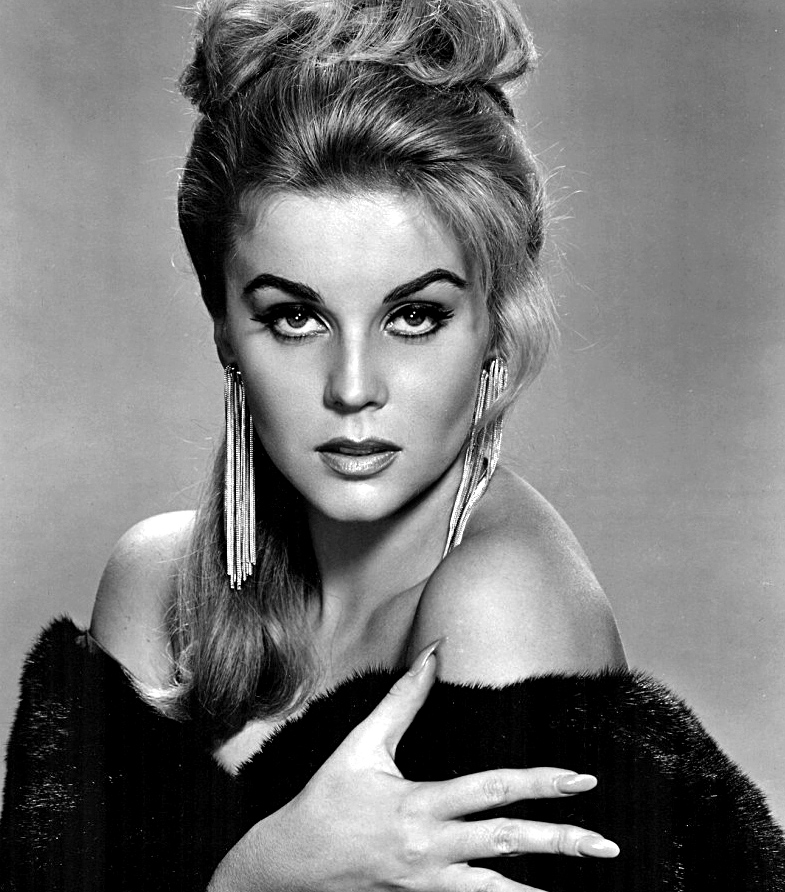
Ann-Margret in a publicity photo from the 1960s

In 1961, Ann-Margret filmed a screen test at 20th Century Fox and was signed to a seven-year contract. She made her film debut in a loan-out to United Artists alongside Bette Davis in Frank Capra's Pocketful of Miracles, a remake of Capra's own Lady for a Day (1933). For her performance, Ann-Margret was awarded her first Golden Globe, for New Actress of the Year, alongside Jane Fonda and Christine Kaufmann.

In a 1962 remake of Rodgers and Hammerstein's musical State Fair, she played the "bad girl" role of Emily opposite Bobby Darin and Pat Boone. She had previously tested for the part of Margie, the "good girl", but the studio bosses deemed her too seductive for that role. In her autobiography, Ann-Margret wrote that the two roles seemed to represent the two sides of her real-life personality. She was shy and reserved offstage but wildly exuberant and sensuous onstage, transforming "from Little Miss Lollipop to Sexpot-Banshee", in her words.

In a 2021 retrospective of Ann-Margret's career for FilmInk, Stephen Vagg argued "she wasn't that well cast as a bad girl. Because she had so much energy and shape, producers thought she was; but she was more effective in parts closer to what she was in real life: an energetic good girl with a twinkle in the eye".

Her performance as the all-American teenager Kim in Bye Bye Birdie (1963) made her a major star. Its premiere at Radio City Music Hall, 16 years after her first visit to the famed theater, was the highest first-week grossing film to date at the Music Hall. Life magazine put her on the cover for the second time and announced that the "torrid dancing almost replaces the central heating in the theater". Her performance earned her a Golden Globe nomination for Best Actress.

She was then asked to sing "Baby Won't You Please Come Home" at President John F. Kennedy's private birthday party at the Waldorf Astoria New York, one year after Marilyn Monroe's famous "Happy Birthday to You". A few months later, Ann-Margret voiced an animated version of herself, named "Ann-Margrock", on the television series The Flintstones. She sang the ballad "The Littlest Lamb" as a lullaby, as well as the rocker, "Ain't Gonna Be a Fool".

Ann-Margret met Elvis Presley on the MGM soundstage when the two filmed Viva Las Vegas (1964). Filmink argued "She had so much energy and pep that she had blown her previous three male co-stars off screen, but Elvis could match her. He was the best on-screen partner she ever had, and she was his". She recorded three duets with Presley for the film: "The Lady Loves Me", "You're the Boss", and "Today, Tomorrow, and Forever". Only "The Lady Loves Me" made it into the final film and none of them were commercially released until years after Presley's death, due to concerns by Colonel Tom Parker that Ann-Margret's presence threatened to overshadow Elvis. Choreographer David Winters was hired because Ann-Margret was his dance student and recommended him for the job. It was Winters' first choreographer credit on film. He would go on to become a common collaborator for both Presley and Ann-Margret.

=== Decline in fortunes and European sojourn (1965–1969) ===
Bye Bye Birdie and Viva Las Vegas had established Ann-Margret as Hollywood's biggest new star, but a string of box-office flops followed until October 1965. The first, Kitten with a Whip, saw Ann-Margret give a "balls-to-the-wall performance" as a juvenile delinquent who entraps a politician. She followed up with The Pleasure Seekers, yet another musical romantic comedy. Ann-Margret was excited to do her next project, Bus Riley's Back in Town; its writer William Inge had penned her favorite film Splendor in the Grass (1961). However Inge was so infuriated by the result that he took his name off the credits of Bus Riley. She then featured in Once a Thief, a crime film intended to be a star-making vehicle for French actor Alain Delon in the United States.

Ann-Margret learned decades later that during this time she had been offered the title role in Cat Ballou, a critically acclaimed box-office smash that the American Film Institute ranked as the tenth greatest Western film of all time. Her agent had turned down the role without telling her. Ann-Margret broke her flop streak with The Cincinnati Kid, in which she played a femme fatale opposite Steve McQueen. It was her first hit since Viva Las Vegas, but her role was not a large one.

While she was working on Once a Thief, she met her future husband Roger Smith, who after his successful run on the private-eye television series 77 Sunset Strip, was performing a live club show at the hungry i on a bill with Bill Cosby and Don Adams. That meeting began their courtship, which was met with resistance from her parents.

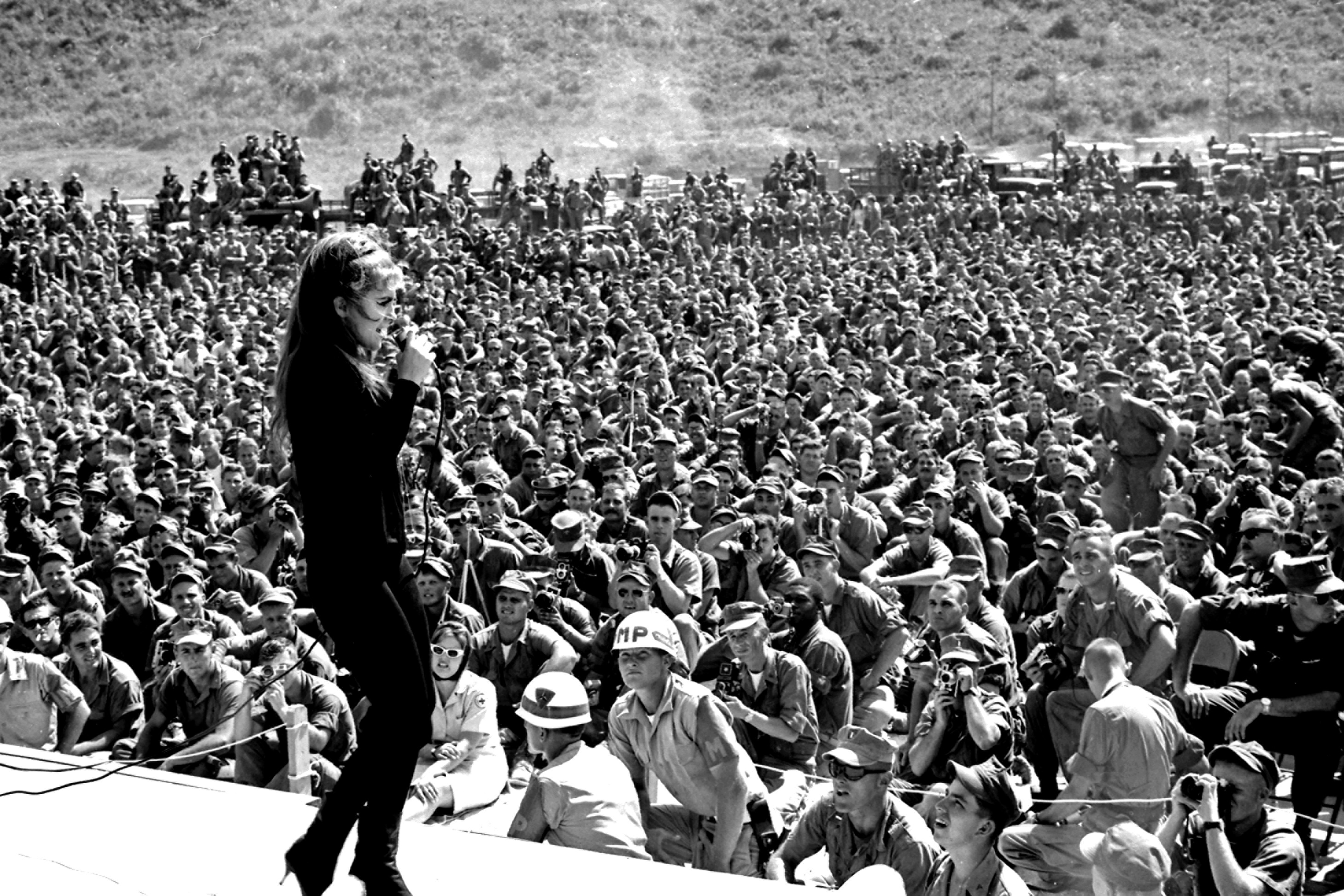
Ann-Margret performing for U.S. service personnel in Vietnam in 1966

In 1966, Ann-Margret starred in four films. Made in Paris, the first of these, was a fashion-focused romantic comedy in which Ann-Margret received top billing. FilmInk attributes its box office failure to "dodgy writing and uninspiring male leads". A month after its release, she teamed up with entertainers Chuck Day and Mickey Jones for a USO tour to entertain U.S. servicemen in South Vietnam and other parts of South-East Asia.

A moderately successful remake of the classic John Ford Western Stagecoach followed, with Ann-Margret essaying the role of a prostitute. She then starred in the "hopelessly confused" sex comedy The Swinger which, in Stephen Vagg's words, "came close to killing her Hollywood career more than any other [film] by virtue of its sheer incompetence."

Ann-Margret ended 1966 by featuring in the hit Dean Martin–starrer Murderers' Row, a spy spoof. Looking at Ann-Margret's uneven draw at the box office, Vagg points out that after Viva Las Vegas, her roles in hit films "had been parts any girl could have played" but the star vehicles that were tailored for her were all flops.

During a lull in her film career in July 1967, Ann-Margret gave her first live performance in Las Vegas, with her husband Roger Smith, whom she had married that May, taking over as her manager after that engagement. Elvis Presley and his entourage came to see her during the show's five-week run and celebrate backstage. According to Ann-Margret's autobiography, Presley sent her a guitar-shaped floral arrangement for each of her Vegas openings.

After the first Vegas run ended, she followed with a CBS television special The Ann-Margret Show, produced and directed by David Winters on 1 December 1968, with guest-stars Bob Hope, Jack Benny, Danny Thomas, and Carol Burnett. Then, she returned to Saigon as part of Hope's Christmas show. A second CBS television special followed, Ann-Margret: From Hollywood With Love, produced, directed and choreographed by David Winters, with guest-stars Dean Martin and Lucille Ball. David Winters and the show were nominated for a Primetime Emmy in Outstanding Choreography.

=== Critical acclaim in supporting roles (1970s) ===
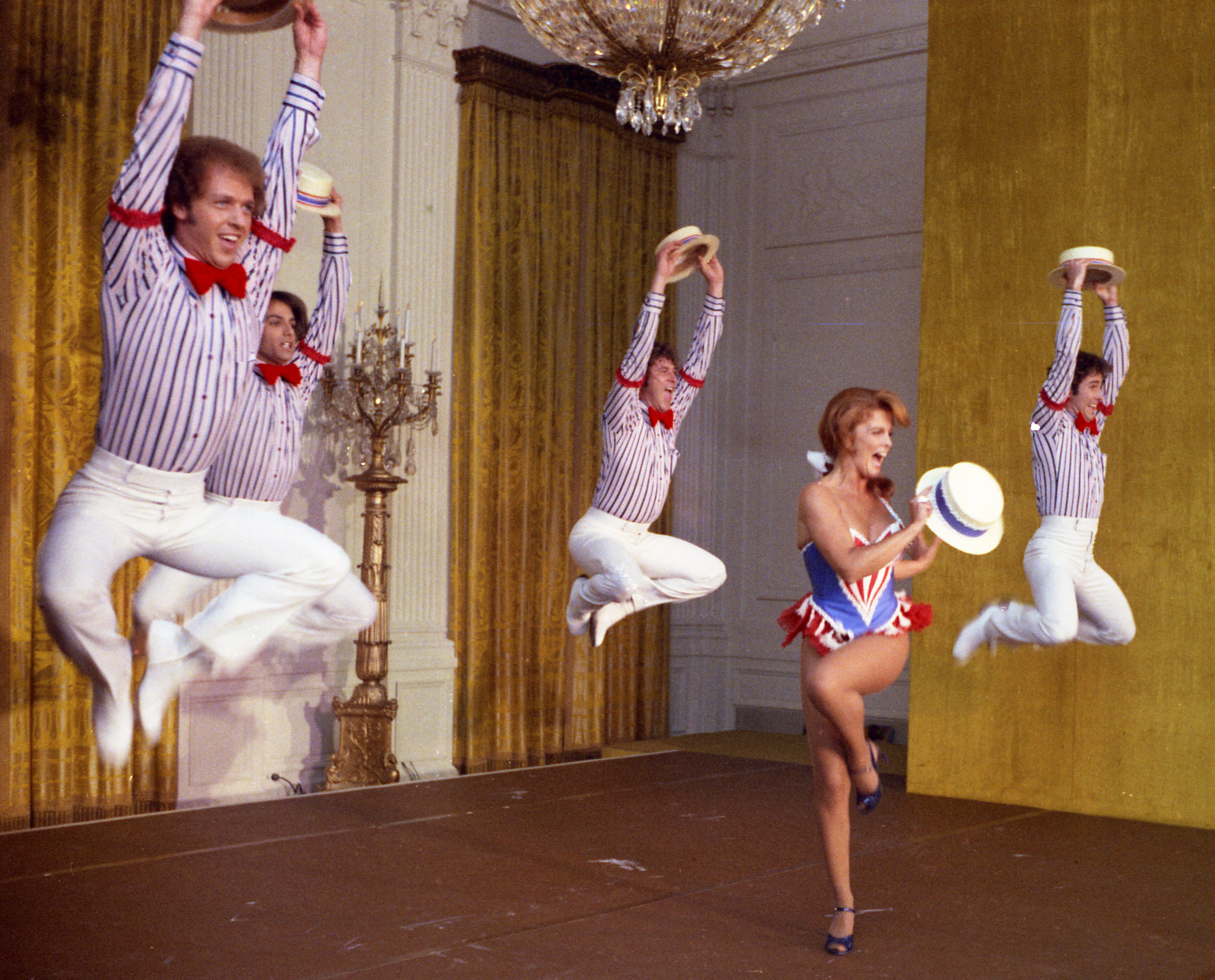
Ann-Margret performing at a state dinner honoring the Shah of Iran in 1975

In 1970, she returned to films with R. P. M., where she starred alongside Anthony Quinn, and C.C. and Company with Joe Namath as a biker and her portraying a fashion journalist.

In 1971, she starred in Carnal Knowledge by director Mike Nichols, playing the girlfriend of a neglectful, arguably abusive character played by Jack Nicholson. She was nominated for the Academy Award for Best Supporting Actress and won the Golden Globe Award for Best Supporting Actress. Filmink argued this amounted to a comeback "in a way...because she never really regained her former status as an above-the-title star of feature films—her follow-up movies were 'girl' parts... the seventies were tough times for female stars who were not Barbra Streisand."

On the set of The Train Robbers in Durango, Mexico, in June 1972, she told Nancy Anderson of Copley News Service that she had been on the "grapefruit diet" and had lost almost 20 pounds (134 to 115) eating unsweetened citrus.

On Sunday, 10 September 1972, while performing at Lake Tahoe, she fell 22 feet (6.7 meters) from an elevated platform to the stage and suffered injuries including a broken left arm, cheekbone, and jawbone. She required meticulous facial reconstructive surgery that required wiring her mouth shut and putting her on a liquid diet. Unable to work for ten weeks, she returned to the stage almost back to normal.

Throughout the 1970s, Ann-Margret balanced her live musical performances with a string of dramatic film roles that played against her glamorous image. In 1973, she starred with John Wayne in The Train Robbers. Then came the musical Tommy in 1975, for which she received her second Oscar nomination, this time for the Academy Award for Best Actress. In addition, she has been nominated for ten Golden Globe Awards, winning five, including her Best Actress – Motion Picture Comedy or Musical for Tommy. On 17 August 1977, Ann-Margret and Roger Smith traveled to Memphis to attend Elvis Presley's funeral. Three months later, she hosted Memories of Elvis featuring abridged versions of the Elvis 1968 TV and Aloha from Hawaii specials.

Other films she co-starred in during the late 1970s include Joseph Andrews (1977), The Last Remake of Beau Geste (1977), and the horror/suspense thriller Magic (1978) with Anthony Hopkins. She had a cameo in The Cheap Detective (1978).

Ann-Margret was an early choice of Allan Carr's to play the role of Sandy Dumbrowski in the 1978 film Grease. At 36 years of age when filming commenced, she was ultimately determined to be too old to convincingly play the role of a high school student. Twenty-eight-year-old Olivia Newton-John got the role instead, and the character was renamed "Sandy Olsson" (after Ann-Margret's birth surname) in her honor.

For her contributions to the film industry, Ann-Margret received a motion picture star on the Hollywood Walk of Fame in 1973. Her star is located at 6501 Hollywood Boulevard.

=== Television-movie era (1980s) ===
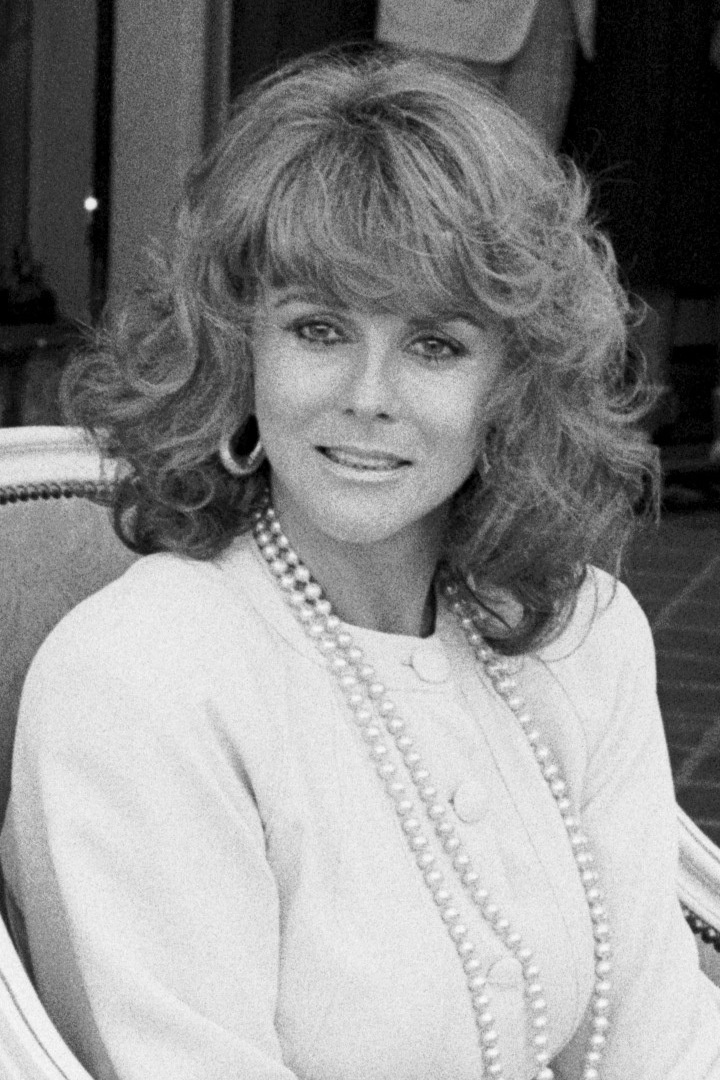
Ann-Margret in 1988

Ann-Margret starred opposite Bruce Dern in Middle Age Crazy (1980). In 1982, she co-starred with Walter Matthau and Dinah Manoff in the film version of Neil Simon's play I Ought to Be in Pictures. That same year also saw the release of Lookin' to Get Out, filmed two years prior in 1980, in which she co-starred with Jon Voight and played the mother of a five-year-old Angelina Jolie in Jolie's screen debut. To round out 1982, she appeared alongside Alan Bates, Glenda Jackson, and Julie Christie in the film adaptation of The Return of the Soldier. She also starred in the TV movies Who Will Love My Children? (1983) and a remake of A Streetcar Named Desire (1984), winning Golden Globe Awards for both performances.

After Barbara Stanwyck won the Primetime Emmy Award for Outstanding Lead Actress in a Limited Series or Movie in 1983 for her role in The Thorn Birds, she mentioned Ann-Margret's performance in Who Will Love My Children?, stating at the podium "I would like to pay a personal tribute at this time to a lady who is a wonderful entertainer...I think she gave one of the finest, most beautiful performances I have ever seen...Ann-Margret, you were superb."

In Twice in a Lifetime (1985) Ann-Margret portrayed a waitress for whom Gene Hackman's character left his wife. The next year she appeared as the wife of Roy Scheider's character in the crime thriller 52 Pick-Up. In 1987 she co-starred with Elizabeth Ashley, and Claudette Colbert, in the last on-screen role of the film legend's career, in the NBC two-part series The Two Mrs. Grenvilles. It earned Ann-Margret another Emmy Award nomination, this time for Outstanding Lead Actress in a Mini Series or a Special.

In 1989, an illustration of Oprah Winfrey appeared on the cover of TV Guide, and although the head was Oprah's, the body was from a 1979 publicity shot of Ann-Margret. The illustration was rendered so tightly in color pencil by freelance artist Chris Notarile that most people thought it was a composite photograph.

=== Continuing film and television career (1990–present) ===
In 1991, she starred in the TV film Our Sons opposite Julie Andrews as mothers of sons who are lovers, one of whom is dying of AIDS. In 1992, she co-starred with Robert Duvall and Christian Bale in the Disney musical Newsies. In 1993, Ann-Margret starred in the hit comedy Grumpy Old Men reuniting with Matthau and Jack Lemmon. Her character returned for Grumpier Old Men (1995), the equally successful sequel which this time co-starred Sophia Loren.

Ann-Margret published an autobiography in 1994 titled Ann-Margret: My Story, in which she publicly acknowledged her battle with and ongoing recovery from alcoholism. She played Belle Watling in Scarlett (1994), a television miniseries loosely based on the 1991 book of the same name written by Alexandra Ripley as a sequel to Margaret Mitchell's 1936 novel Gone with the Wind. In 1995, Empire magazine ranked her tenth on its list of the 100 Sexiest Stars in film history.

She also filmed Any Given Sunday (1999) for director Oliver Stone, portraying the mother of football team owner Cameron Diaz. She filmed a cameo appearance for The Limey, but her performance was cut from the movie.

Ann-Margret also starred in several television films, including Queen: The Story of an American Family (1993), Following Her Heart (1994), and Life of the Party (1999), the latter of which she received nominations for an Emmy Award, a Golden Globe Award, and a Screen Actors Guild Award.

In 2000, she recorded the theme song, a modified version of the Viva Las Vegas theme, to the live-action film The Flintstones in Viva Rock Vegas.

She made guest appearances on the television show Touched by an Angel in 2000 and three episodes of Third Watch in 2003. In 2001, she made her first appearance in a stage musical, playing the character of brothel owner Mona Stangley in a new touring production of The Best Little Whorehouse in Texas. The production co-starred Gary Sandy and Ed Dixon. She played Jimmy Fallon's mother in the 2004 comedy Taxi, co-starring Queen Latifah.

In 2001, Ann-Margret worked with Art Greenhaw on the album God Is Love: The Gospel Sessions. The project resulted in her second Grammy Award nomination and first Dove Award nomination for Best Album of the Year in a Gospel category. They teamed up again in 2004 for the album Ann-Margret's Christmas Carol Collection. She performed material from the album at two auditorium church services at Crystal Cathedral in Garden Grove, California, and broadcast worldwide on the program Hour of Power.

In November 2005, Ann-Margret reunited with Chuck Day and Mickey Jones for an encore of their 1966 USO tour for veterans and troops at Nellis Air Force Base, Nevada.

In 2006, Ann-Margret had supporting roles in the box-office hits The Break-Up with Jennifer Aniston and Vince Vaughn, and The Santa Clause 3 with Tim Allen. She also starred in several independent films, such as Memory (2006) with Billy Zane and Dennis Hopper. In 2009, she appeared in the comedy Old Dogs with John Travolta and Robin Williams.

Ann-Margret guest-starred in an episode of Law & Order: Special Victims Unit, "Bedtime", which first aired on 31 March 2010, on NBC. She received her sixth Emmy nomination for her performance. She also appeared in the Lifetime series, Army Wives, in the episode "Guns and Roses" (season four, episode five), which originally aired 9 May 2010. On 29 August 2010, she won an Emmy, her first, for Guest Performance by an Actress for her SVU performance. The Emmy venue audience gave her a standing ovation.

On 14 October 2010, Ann-Margret appeared on CBS's CSI.

In the fall of 2011, she co-starred with Andy Williams for a series of concerts at his Moon River Theater in Branson, Missouri. These proved to be Williams' last performances before his death in 2012.

In 2014, she began appearing in a recurring role in the Showtime original series Ray Donovan. On 1 October 2018, it was announced that she had joined the second season of the Syfy series Happy! in a recurring role.

In 2018, she guest-starred in The Kominsky Method, portraying Diane, a widow and possible love interest for the recently widowed Norman, played by Alan Arkin.

On 14 April 2023, "Born to Be Wild," which was her first album in over a decade, was released. The album charted at number 93 on the Billboard Top Album Sales, the first time an Ann-Margret album had charted since Beauty and the Beard in 1964. On 28 November 2023, she was a guest narrator of Disney's Candlelight Processional at Walt Disney World.

== Personal life ==
Ann-Margret is a stepmother of the three children of her husband Roger Smith, an actor, who later became her manager. She and Smith were married for 50 years from 8 May 1967 until his death on 4 June 2017. Before her marriage to Smith, she dated Eddie Fisher, was briefly engaged to Burt Sugarman, and was romantically linked to Elvis Presley when they co-starred in the film Viva Las Vegas in 1964.

Ann-Margret has given talks about her Swedish-American heritage, including her explorations of Swedish cuisine.

A keen motorcyclist, Ann-Margret rode a 500 cc Triumph T100C Tiger in The Swinger (1966) and used the same model, fitted with a nonstandard electric starter, in her stage show and her TV specials. She was featured in Triumph Motorcycles' official advertisements in the 1960s. She suffered three broken ribs and a fractured shoulder when she was thrown off a motorcycle in rural Minnesota in 2000.

In a 2012 interview, she stated, "All my life I've had this feeling, deep, deep, deep inside of me ...my faith and my feelings. ...I mean you go outside and you see flowers. You see the trees. You see all your loved ones, you see ...and then you think of Who created it all." She described her relationship with God, and with Jesus Christ as "something which is really important to me. If I thought that I would never see my mother and father again, I couldn't make it. I could not go a step further."

On 14 May 2022, she was awarded an honorary doctoral degree in Humane Letters by the University of Nevada, Las Vegas.

In early November 2026 she was spotted in a wheelchair during a rare Los Angeles outing months after a fall left her with a broken elbow.

== Portrayal ==
The 2005 CBS miniseries Elvis includes the story of her affair with Elvis Presley during the filming of Viva Las Vegas. She was portrayed by the actress Rose McGowan. She also provided the voice of a fictionalized version of herself in a 1963 Flintstones episode "Ann-Margrock Presents".

== Filmography ==
=== Film ===
| Year | Title | Role | Notes |
|---|---|---|---|
| 1961 | Pocketful of Miracles | Louise | Golden Globe Award for New Star of the Year – Actress |
| 1962 | State Fair | Emily Porter | |
| 1963 | Bye Bye Birdie | Kim McAfee | Nominated – Golden Globe Award for Best Actress – Motion Picture Comedy or Musical |
| 1964 | Viva Las Vegas | Rusty Martin | |
| 1964 | Kitten with a Whip | Jody Dvorak | |
| 1964 | The Pleasure Seekers | Fran Hobson | |
| 1965 | Bus Riley's Back in Town | Laurel | |
| 1965 | Once a Thief | Kristine Pedak | |
| 1965 | The Cincinnati Kid | Melba | |
| 1966 | Made in Paris | Maggie Scott | |
| 1966 | Stagecoach | Dallas | |
| 1966 | The Swinger | Kelly Olsson | |
| 1966 | Murderers' Row | Suzie | |
| 1967 | The Tiger and the Pussycat | Carolina | |
| 1968 | Mr. Kinky | Maggie, a Hippy | |
| 1968 | Seven Men and One Brain | Leticia | |
| 1969 | Rebus | Singer | |
| 1970 | R. P. M. | Rhoda | |
| 1970 | C.C. and Company | Ann McCalley | |
| 1971 | Carnal Knowledge | Bobbie | Golden Globe Award for Best Supporting Actress – Motion Picture; Nominated – Academy Award for Best Supporting Actress; Nominated – New York Film Critics Circle Award for Best Supporting Actress |
| 1972 | The Outside Man | Nancy Robson | |
| 1973 | The Train Robbers | Mrs. Lowe | |
| 1975 | Tommy | Nora Walker | Golden Globe Award for Best Actress – Motion Picture Comedy or Musical; Nominated – Academy Award for Best Actress |
| 1976 | The Twist | Charlie Minerva | |
| 1977 | Joseph Andrews | Lady Booby | Nominated – Golden Globe Award for Best Supporting Actress – Motion Picture |
| 1977 | The Last Remake of Beau Geste | Flavia Geste | |
| 1978 | The Cheap Detective | Jezebel Dezire | |
| 1978 | Magic | Peggy Ann Snow | Nominated – Saturn Award for Best Actress |
| 1979 | The Villain | Charming Jones | |
| 1980 | Middle Age Crazy | Sue Ann Burnett | Nominated – Genie Award for Best Performance by a Foreign Actress |
| 1982 | The Return of the Soldier | Jenny Baldry | |
| 1982 | Lookin' to Get Out | Patti Warner | |
| 1982 | I Ought to Be in Pictures | Steffy Blondell | |
| 1985 | Twice in a Lifetime | Audrey Minelli | |
| 1986 | 52 Pick-Up | Barbara Mitchell | |
| 1987 | A Tiger's Tale | Rose Butts | |
| 1988 | A New Life | Jackie Jardino | |
| 1992 | Newsies | Medda Larkson | Nominated – Golden Raspberry Award for Worst Supporting Actress |
| 1993 | Grumpy Old Men | Ariel Truax | |
| 1995 | Grumpier Old Men | Ariel Gustafson | |
| 1999 | Any Given Sunday | Margaret Pagniacci | |
| 2000 | The Last Producer | Mira Wexler | |
| 2001 | A Woman's a Helluva Thing | Claire Anders-Blackett | |
| 2002 | Interstate 60 | Mrs. James | |
| 2004 | Taxi | Mrs. Washburn | |
| 2005 | Mem-o-re | Carol Hargrave | |
| 2006 | Tales of the Rat Fink | Heartbreaker | Voice role |
| 2006 | The Break-Up | Wendy Meyers | |
| 2006 | The Santa Clause 3: The Escape Clause | Sylvia Newman | |
| 2009 | All's Faire in Love | Her Majesty the Queen | |
| 2009 | Old Dogs | Martha | |
| 2009 | The Loss of a Teardrop Diamond | Cornelia | |
| 2011 | Lucky | Pauline Keller | |
| 2017 | Going in Style | Annie | |
| 2018 | Papa | Barbara | |
| 2021 | Queen Bees | Margot | |

=== Box-office ranking ===
For two years, Ann-Margret was voted by movie exhibitors as being among the more popular actors in the United States:

- 1964 – 8th
- 1965 – 17th

=== Television ===
| Year | Title | Role | Notes |
|---|---|---|---|
| 1961 | The Jack Benny Program | Herself | Episode: "Variety Show" |
| 1962 | The Andy Williams Special | Herself | Episode: "May 4, 1962" |
| 1963 | The Flintstones | Ann-Margrock (voice) | Episode: "Ann-Margrock Presents" |
| 1970 | Here's Lucy | Ann-Margret | Episode: "Lucy and Ann-Margret" |
| 1971 | Dames at Sea | Ruby | TV adaptation of stage musical |
| 1983 | Who Will Love My Children? | Lucile Fray | TV movie Golden Globe Award for Best Actress – Miniseries or Television Film; Nominated – Primetime Emmy Award for Outstanding Lead Actress in a Miniseries or a Movie |
| 1984 | A Streetcar Named Desire | Blanche DuBois | TV movie Golden Globe Award for Best Actress – Miniseries or Motion Picture Made for Television |
| 1987 | The Two Mrs. Grenvilles | Ann Arden Grenville | Miniseries; Nominated – Golden Globe Award for Best Actress – Miniseries or Television Film; Nominated – Primetime Emmy Award for Outstanding Lead Actress in a Miniseries or a Movie |
| 1991 | Our Sons | Luanne Barnes | TV movie |
| 1993 | Alex Haley's Queen | Sally Jackson | 2 episodes Nominated – Golden Globe Award for Best Supporting Actress – Series, Miniseries or Television Film; Nominated – Primetime Emmy Award for Outstanding Supporting Actress in a Miniseries or a Movie |
| 1994 | Scarlett | Belle Watling | Miniseries |
| 1994 | Following Her Heart | Ingalill "Lena" Lundquist | TV movie |
| 1994 | Nobody's Children | Carol Stevens | TV movie |
| 1996 | Blue Rodeo | Maggie Yearwood | TV movie |
| 1996 | Seduced by Madness | Diane Kay Borchardt | Miniseries |
| 1998 | Life of the Party | Pamela Harriman | TV movie Nominated – Golden Globe Award for Best Actress – Miniseries or Television Film; Nominated – Primetime Emmy Award for Outstanding Lead Actress in a Miniseries or a Movie; Nominated – Screen Actors Guild Award for Outstanding Performance by a Female Actor in a Miniseries or Television Movie |
| 1998 | Four Corners | Amanda "Maggie" Wyatt | 2 episodes |
| 1999 | Happy Face Murders | Lorraine Petrovich | TV movie |
| 2000 | Perfect Murder, Perfect Town | Nedra Paugh | Miniseries |
| 2000 | The 10th Kingdom | Cinderella | Miniseries |
| 2000 | Touched by an Angel | Angela | Episode: "Millennium" |
| 2000 | Popular | God | Episode: "Are You There, God? It's Me Ann-Margret" |
| 2001 | Blonde | Della Monroe | Miniseries |
| 2003 | Third Watch | Judge Barbara Halsted | 3 episodes |
| 2004 | A Place Called Home | Tula Jeeters | TV movie |
| 2010 | Law & Order: Special Victims Unit | Rita Wills | Episode: "Bedtime"; Primetime Emmy Award for Outstanding Guest Actress in a Drama Series |
| 2010 | Army Wives | Aunt Edie | Episode: "Guns & Roses" |
| 2010 | CSI: Crime Scene Investigation | Margot Wilton | Episode: "Sqweegel" |
| 2014 | Ray Donovan | June | 2 episodes |
| 2018 | The Kominsky Method | Diane | 2 episodes Nominated – Online Film & Television Association Award – Best Guest Actress in a Comedy Series |
| 2019 | Happy! | Bebe DeBarge | 2 episodes |
| 2022 | A Holiday Spectacular | Grandma Margret | TV Movie |

== Discography ==
=== Albums ===
- And Here She Is ... Ann-Margret (1961)
- On the Way Up (1962)
- The Vivacious One (1962)
- Bachelors' Paradise (1963)
- 3 Great Girls – with Della Reese and Kitty Kallen (1963) – four songs
- Beauty and the Beard (1964) (with Al Hirt)
- David Merrick Presents Hits from His Broadway Hits (1964) (with David Merrick) – four songs
- Songs from The Swinger (and Other Swingin' Songs) (1966)
- The Cowboy and the Lady (1969) (with Lee Hazlewood)
- Ann-Margret (1980)
- God Is Love: The Gospel Sessions (2001)
- Ann-Margret's Christmas Carol Collection (2004)
- God Is Love: The Gospel Sessions 2 (2011)
- Born to Be Wild (2023)

=== Singles ===
| Title | Year | Peak chart positions | | | | |
| Title | Year | US | US AC | US Dance | JPN | CAN |
|---|---|---|---|---|---|---|
| "Lost Love" | 1961 | — | — | — | — | — |
| "I Just Don't Understand" | 1961 | 17 | — | — | — | 6 |
| "It Do Me So Good" | 1961 | 97 (Note: "It Do Me So Good" also charted at #58 on the Record World Singles Chart and #90 on the Cash Box Charts.) | — | — | | |
| "What Am I Supposed to Do" | 1962 | 82 | 19 | — | — | — |
| "Jim Dandy" | 1962 | (Note: "Jim Dandy" did not enter the Billboard Hot 100, but did peak at #127 on the Record World Singles Chart.) | — | — | — | — |
| "So Did I" | 1963 | — | — | — | — | — |
| "Bye Bye Birdie" / "Take All the Kisses" | 1963 | (Note: "Take All The Kisses" did not enter the Billboard Hot 100, but did peak at #101 on the Record World Singles Chart and #42 on the Cash Box Looking Ahead Chart.) | — | — | 2 | — |
| "Someday Soon" | 1964 | — | — | — | — | — |
| "Man's Favorite Sport" | 1964 | — | — | — | — | — |
| "Hey Little Star" | 1964 | (Note: "Hey Little Star" did not enter the Billboard Hot 100, but did peak at #130 on the Record World Singles Chart.) | — | — | — | — |
| "Mister Kiss Kiss Bang Bang" | 1966 | — | — | — | — | — |
| "Sleep in the Grass" | 1969 | (Note: "Sweet" did not enter the Billboard Hot 100, but did peak at number 13 on the Bubbling Under Hot 100.) | — | — | — | — |
| "Love Rush" | 1979 | — | — | 8 | — | — |
| "Midnight Message" | 1980 | — | — | 12 | — | — |
| "Everybody Needs Somebody Sometimes" | 1981 | — | — | 22 | — | — |
"—" denotes a recording that did not chart or was not released in that territory

=== Soundtrack appearances ===
- State Fair (1962)
- Bye Bye Birdie (1963)
- The Pleasure Seekers (1965)
- Rebus (1969)
- C.C. & Company (1970)
- Dames at Sea (1971)
- Tommy (1975)
- Newsies (1992)
- The Flintstones in Viva Rock Vegas (2000)
- The Best Little Whorehouse in Texas (2001)
- Viva Las Vegas (LP reissue of Viva Las Vegas EP) (2007) (with Elvis Presley)
- Going in Style (2017)

== Theatre productions ==
- Love Letters, with Burt Reynolds
- The Best Little Whorehouse in Texas (2001, touring production)

== Orders ==
- Commander of the Royal Order of the Polar Star (KNO) (2 December 1988)

== Awards and nominations ==
| Year | Association | Category | Nominated work | Result |
|---|---|---|---|---|
| 1961 | Billboard Year-End | Most Promising Female Vocalist | | Won |
| 1962 | Grammy Award | Best New Artist | | Nominated |
| 1962 | Golden Laurel | Top Female New Personality | | Won |
| 1962 | Golden Globe Award | Most Promising Newcomer – Female | | Won |
| 1963 | Golden Laurel | Top Female Musical Performance | State Fair | Won |
| 1963 | Golden Laurel | Top Female Star | | Nominated |
| 1964 | Golden Laurel | Top Female Comedy Performance | Bye Bye Birdie | Won |
| 1964 | Golden Laurel | Top Female Star | | Nominated |
| 1964 | Golden Globe Award | Best Motion Picture Actress – Musical/Comedy | Bye Bye Birdie | Nominated |
| 1964 | Photoplay Award | Most Popular Female Star | | Won |
| 1965 | Golden Laurel | Musical Performance, Female | Viva Las Vegas | Won |
| 1966 | Golden Laurel | Musical Performance, Female | Made in Paris | Won |
| 1967 | Golden Laurel | Top Female Star | | Nominated |
| 1972 | Academy Award | Best Supporting Actress | Carnal Knowledge | Nominated |
| 1972 | Golden Globe Award | Best Motion Picture Actress in a Supporting Role | Carnal Knowledge | Won |
| 1973 | Hollywood Walk of Fame | Motion Pictures Star | Contributions to the film industry | Inducted |
| 1976 | Academy Award | Best Actress | Tommy | Nominated |
| 1976 | Golden Globe Award | Best Motion Picture Actress – Musical/Comedy | Tommy | Won |
| 1978 | Golden Globe Award | Best Motion Picture Actress in a Supporting Role | Joseph Andrews | Nominated |
| 1979 | Saturn Award | Best Actress | Magic | Nominated |
| 1981 | Genie Award | Best Performance by a Foreign Actress | Middle Age Crazy | Nominated |
| 1983 | Primetime Emmy Award | Outstanding Lead Actress in a Limited Series or a Special | Who Will Love My Children? | Nominated |
| 1983 | Golden Apple Award | Female Star of the Year | | Won |
| 1984 | Primetime Emmy Award | Outstanding Lead Actress in a Limited Series or a Special | A Streetcar Named Desire | Nominated |
| 1984 | Golden Globe Award | Best Performance by an Actress in a Mini-Series or Motion Picture Made for TV | Who Will Love My Children? | Won |
| 1985 | Golden Globe Award | Best Performance by an Actress in a Mini-Series or Motion Picture Made for TV | A Streetcar Named Desire | Won |
| 1987 | Primetime Emmy Award | Outstanding Lead Actress in a Mini Series or a Special | The Two Mrs. Grenvilles | Nominated |
| 1987 | Women in Film | Crystal Award | For outstanding women who, through their endurance and the excellence of their work, have helped to expand the role of women within the entertainment industry. | Recipient |
| 1988 | Golden Globe Award | Best Performance by an Actress in a Mini-Series or Motion Picture Made for TV | The Two Mrs. Grenvilles | Nominated |
| 1993 | Primetime Emmy Award | Outstanding Lead Actress in a Mini Series or a Special | Queen: The Story of an American Family | Nominated |
| 1994 | Golden Globe Award | Best Performance by an Actress in a Supporting Role in a Series, Mini-Series or Motion Picture Made for TV | Queen: The Story of an American Family | Nominated |
| 1999 | Primetime Emmy Award | Outstanding Lead Actress in a Miniseries or a Movie | Life of the Party: The Pamela Harriman Story | Nominated |
| 1999 | Golden Globe Award | Best Performance by an Actress in a Mini-Series or Motion Picture Made for TV | Life of the Party: The Pamela Harriman Story | Nominated |
| 1999 | Screen Actors Guild Award | Outstanding Performance by a Female Actor in a TV Movie or Miniseries | Life of the Party: The Pamela Harriman Story | Nominated |
| 2001 | Grammy Award | Best Southern, Country, or Bluegrass Gospel Album | God is Love: The Gospel Sessions | Nominated |
| 2002 | GMA Dove Award | Best Country Album | God is Love: The Gospel Sessions | Nominated |
| 2003 | USO | Spirit of Hope Award | | Won |
| 2005 | CineVegas International Film Festival | Centennial Award | | Won |
| 2010 | Primetime Emmy Award | Outstanding Guest Actress in a Drama Series | Law & Order: SVU: Bedtime | Won |
| 2013 | Ft. Lauderdale International Film Festival | Lifetime Achievement Award | | Recipient |
| 2019 | Online Film & Television Association Award | Best Guest Actress in a Comedy Series | The Kominsky Method | Nominated |
| 2019 | USO | Bob Hope Legacy Award | | Won |
| 2019 | Los Angeles Press Club | Legend Award | | Won |
| 2021 | Family Film Awards | Lifetime Achievement Award | | Won |
| 2024 | Women's Image Network Awards | Living Legend Award | | Won |
| 2025 | Cinecon | Legacy Award | | Won |
| 2026 | USO | USO Challenge Coin | | Won |
| 2026 | Chita Rivera Awards | Lifetime Achievement Award | | Won |
| 2026 | Plaza Classic Film Festival | Plaza Classic Award for Lifetime Achievement | | Won |

== See also ==
- List of dancers

== Bibliography ==
- Ann-Margret; Todd Gold (1994). Ann-Margret: My Story. G. P. Putnam's Sons. ISBN 978-0-399-13891-1.
