= Big John Hamilton (vocalist) =

American vocalist

- Origin: United States
- Genre: Singer
- Instrument: voice
- Labels: Minaret, SSS International Records, Emerald Coast Records, Sundazed Music

Big John Hamilton was an American vocalist. He is known as a singer of Southern Soul music. Hamilton lived in Florida.

== Background ==
He made eight solo records (45s) as well as duets with Doris Allen. They sang a version of Buddy Miles' "Them Changes" for Florida's Minaret Records label between 1967 and 1970. Sundazed Records released a Compact Disc in 2006 of his music called How Much Can a Man Take, the name of the title song from 1968.

== Career ==
Big John Hamilton recorded "The Train" and "Big Bad John" which were released on single, Minaret 124. The record was a Four Star pick in the 29 April 1967 issue of Record World. The reviewer wrote that the mood was just right on the bluesy single and to watch the sales.

Hamilton recorded the song "Big Fanny" backed with "How Much Can a Man Take". The song was referred to as powerful in the 2 March 1968 issue of Record World. The editor of "R&B Beat Where It's At" said that they dug the B side as well.

Hamilton and Doris Allen covered the Buddy Miles song "Them Changes". Backed with "Bright Star", it was released on Minaret MIN-159 in 1970.
