= Audrey Arno =

German singer (1942–2012)

Background information
- Also known as: Audrey
- Born: Adrianna Medini; March 7, 1942; Mannheim, Nazi Germany
- Died: June 9, 2012 (aged 70) Las Vegas, Nevada, U.S.
- Occupations: Actress, singer

Audrey Arno (born Adrianna Medini; March 7, 1942 – June 9, 2012) was a German singer and actress. Her biggest success was in France in the 1960s, where for a time she was known simply as Audrey.

== Biography ==
Adrianna Medini was born on March 7, 1942 (or March 17, according to some sources) in Mannheim, Germany. In her youth, she was a horse artist in a circus. In 1960, she got a recording contract in France. Her first recordings were issued as an EP titled L’Homme et la femme. She followed it up with other EPs, Printemps and É vero. In the meantime, she also recorded in Germany with Hazy Osterwald. One of her recordings with the Hazy Osterwald Sextet was Wieder mal Paschanga (Die Musik aus Caracas). The Cuban-rhythm flavored song, issued as La Pachanga, was Arno and Osterwald's U.S hit (#87) in the Billboard Hot 100 in 1961. More singles followed, among them Toute ma vie, a French language cover of Gene McDaniels' Tower of Strength.

In 1962 and 1964, she played minor roles in French film productions, Comment réussir en amour and Du grabuge chez les veuves. On German television, she was seen in various shows such as Hotel Victoria and Der goldene Schuß. In 1964, she earned a recording contract with Henri Salvador's record label. He also wrote a couple of songs for her, the bigger part of her repertoire did however remain cover versions of American hit songs. She settled in Paris, France, and sang in Paris and Monte Carlo stage productions. In the early 1970s, she moved to Las Vegas, Nevada, where she appeared in the local production of Moulin Rouge. She lived and worked in Nevada until her death.

Audrey Arno died in a nursing home in Nevada, from Alzheimer's disease, aged 70.
