= Teach Me Tonight =

1953 jazz song by Gene De Paul and Sammy Cahn

Song
- Published: 1953
- Genre: Jazz standard
- Composer: Gene de Paul
- Lyricist: Sammy Cahn

"Teach Me Tonight" is a popular song that has become a jazz standard. The music was written by Gene De Paul, the lyrics by Sammy Cahn. The song was published in 1953.

== Early recordings ==
Five versions charted in 1954 and 1955:

- Janet Brace was apparently first, making the Billboard chart on October 23, 1954, and eventually reaching No. 23. First recording from 1953
- Jo Stafford – No. 15 in 1954
- Dinah Washington – a No. 4 R&B/Hip-Hop Songs hit in 1954, inducted into the Grammy Hall of Fame in 1999
- Helen Grayco – No. 29 in 1954
- The DeCastro Sisters ("It's Love" / "Teach Me Tonight", Abbott Record Co. 3001) – No. 2 in 1955. In addition, a 1959 re-recording titled "Teach Me Tonight Cha Cha" went to No. 76 on the Hot 100. The most successful version of "Teach Me Tonight" in the UK was that recorded by The De Castro Sisters. Released in 1954, their version peaked at Number 20 on the UK Singles Chart in February 1955.

== Other well-known recordings ==
- In 1962, actor and singer George Maharis recorded his version of the song and included it on his album George Maharis Sings! The song released as a single reached No. 25 on the Billboard Hot 100 in 1962. In Canada it reached No. 8.
- In 1982, Al Jarreau included his version on "Breakin' Away". In the US, this version went to No. 70 on the Hot 100 and No. 51 on the Hot Soul Singles chart. In addition, it went to No. 19 on the Adult Contemporary chart.
