= Melquíades Fundora =

Cuban charanga bandleader and flautist

Melquíades Fundora Dina (20 March 1926 – 14 February 2009) was a Cuban charanga bandleader and flautist.

Fundora formed his charanga band La Sublime in 1957. He was born in Nueva Paz, near Havana on 20 March 1926. Fundora died on 14 February 2009, at the age of 82.
