= Giulia Millanta =

- Giulia Millanta singing and playing guitar on stage

Background information
- Genres: Alternative Folk, Indie-folk, Americana,
- Occupations: singer, songwriter, musician, writer, producer
- Instruments: vocals, guitar, ukulele, baritone guitar
- Years active: 2008–present
- Labels: Cavernjatt Records, Ugly Cat Music, Audioglobe
- Website: https://www.giuliamillanta.com

Giulia Millanta is an Italian-American Indie-Folk and Americana singer-songwriter from Austin, Texas.

A vocalist and guitarist, she also plays upright bass and ukulele and sings in four languages (English, Italian, Spanish and French).

She has been described by Michael Greenblatt of The Aquarian Weekly as "deeply evocative with a dash of Piaf, a sprinkle of Lady Day, a pinch of Norah Jones and a teaspoon of Madeleine Peyroux." "She has been called smart, eclectic, adventurous and cool, and credited with psychedelic grooveability whilst 'baring her clairvoyant soul' to 'deliver musical mojo'".

She has released eight solo albums to date and regularly tours throughout the US and Europe.

== Early life ==
Giulia started playing the guitar at an early age when her father showed her the first few chords and taught her how to play some traditional songs.

At the age of thirteen, a life-threatening horse accident caused her to spend a month and a half in the hospital to recover from a coma due to a skull fracture. That event left a mark and, even though she was young, she promised herself she would always live her life at the fullest.

She has always had an inclination to travel and explore the world. She first moved to the mountains in Tuscany to work as a horse trainer and touring guide. Then she spent a year and a half in Barcelona, Spain (2005–2006) playing music and busking. Returned in Florence, she got her degree in general medicine, summa cum laude, from the University of Florence in 2007, but never practiced the profession.

In her late twenties, she started performing in bars and clubs and she began to write her own songs.

== Career ==
In 2008 Giulia signed with the Florentine label Cavern Jatt Records and debuted with Giulia and the Dizzyness, an electronic-folk-experimental project featuring Italian musicians such as Mario Arcari (Fossati), Matteo Addabbo, and Ettore Bonafè.

Performing at the Acoustic Guitar Meeting in Sarzana in the spring of 2010 her "accomplished guitar style and songs" earned her the "New Sounds of Acoustic Music" award. This led to an endorsement by the guitar makers Eko, choice of the most famous '60s-'80s singer-songwriters throughout Italy.

In 2011 under her own DIY label, Ugly Cat Music, she wrote, produced and released Dropping Down, distributed internationally by Audioglobe, featuring, among others, the outstanding talents of Michael Manring and the Grammy Award–winning guitarist Ed Gerhard.

By 2012, after having toured mainland Europe, Giulia moved to Austin, Texas and released Dust and Desire (Ugly Cat Music/Audioglobe) featuring and co-produced by guitarist David Pulkingham (Patty Griffin, Robert Plant). With Pulkingham and percussionist Michael Longoria she also started a band called The Texas Magpies and released a cover record in 2013.

In 2014 she released The Funambulist (Ugly Cat Music), a concept album about life between two continents and cultures. The Funambulist was enthusiastically received by audiences and critics.

Dave Marsh said about her: "The best and scariest thing about Giulia Millanta is not just that she is truly a tightrope walker herself but that she continually pulls you out there with her... with melodies, singing, stories, imagery. No matter what language her lyrics may be in... and I've lost count of how many her lyrics use here... she's always understandable because her music is, like any fine art, universally recognizable. I can't wait for her next one!"

2016 was the year of her fifth solo album, Moonbeam Parade (Ugly Cat Music/ internationally distributed by Shellshock), with 13 new tunes. The album was positively reviewed by Jeff Burger, who called it an "eclectic, adventurous, well-sung CD" and included in the top ten Americana Records of 2016 by Classicalite.

Between 2016 and 2018 Giulia continued to travel and tour in the United States, the United Kingdom and mainland Europe, sharing the stage with world artists like Bruce Channel (author of "Hey! Baby" featured in the movie Dirty Dancing), Spooner Oldham (keyboard player featured on many Aretha Franklin records), Jaston Williams (writer and performer of Greater Tuna), Hamell on Trial (New York City–based punk-folk hero) and many more.

In 2018 Giulia released Conversation with a Ghost, produced by Giulia herself and guitarist Gabriel Rhodes (Willie Nelson, Billy Joe Shaver). The record was recorded live with Austin musicians who in the past two years had become her steady band members: Glenn Fukunaga on bass and Dony Wynn (Robert Palmer) on drums. It features talents like Marc Ribot (Tom Waits) on electric guitar, Joel Guzman (Paul Simon) on accordion, John Mills (Aretha Franklin, David Byrne) on horns, David Pulkingham (Patty Griffin) on guitar, and Kimmie Rhodes on background vocals.

Also, in December 2018 Giulia was awarded the Premio Ciampi, an Italian national music contest that takes place annually in Livorno since 1995 organized by the cultural association "Premio Ciampi". The main competition is reserved for unpublished songs. A prize is also awarded for the best cover of a song by Piero Ciampi, while there is an award for the best record debut of the year and a career award. The award ceremony takes place in October in Livorno within a program of concerts and cultural initiatives lasting a few days. Giulia won the prize for "Not You", her version of Piero Ciampi's song "Tu no".

After two years of collaborations and touring extensively in the US and Northern Europe, Giulia returned to the studio in early 2020 to record a new album. Tomorrow is a Bird, once again co-produced with guitarist and polo-instrumentalist Gabriel Rhodes, features musicians in the Austin music scene.

A self-published book entitled Between the Strings explores the other side of being a musician and her life on and off the road, and marks Giulia's debut as a writer.

In the summer and fall of 2021 Giulia recorded Woman on the Moon (released in April 2022). Almost entirely performed by Giulia and Gabriel with the exception of drum parts, the record is a journey of separation and unity, through the masculine and feminine inside of us.

She has shared the stage with rock band 10,000 Maniacs and was selected for an Official Showcase at Folk Alliance International 2022 in Kansas City.

In the spring of 2022, Giulia published her first novel, Fratture, with Italian publishing company Porto Seguro.

In 2024, Giulia published her first cookbook called "Dinner with Giulia – Flavors, songs and stories of a Florentine Troubadour" along with her 9th record "Only Luna Knows", which was released in early 2025 as Vinyl with 2 bonus tracks (Ugly Cat Music, La Chute, Audioglobe)

== Discography ==
- 2008 – Giulia and the Dizzyness (Cavern Jatt Records)
- 2011 – Dropping Down (Ugly Cat Music/Audioglobe)
- 2012 – Dust and Desire (Ugly Cat Music)
- 2014 – The Funambulist (Ugly Cat Music)
- 2016 – Moonbeam Parade (Ugly Cat Music/Shellshock)
- 2018 – Conversation with a Ghost (Ugly Cat Music/Audioglobe)
- 2020 – Tomorrow is a Bird (Ugly Cat Music)
- 2022 – Woman on the Moon (Ugly Cat Music)
- 2024 – Only Luna Knows (Ugly Cat Music, La Chute)
- 2025 - Only Luna Knows Vinyl edition with bonus tracks (Ugly Cat Music, la Chute, Audioglobe)

== See also ==
- Music of Austin, Texas
