= Childish Things =

Studio album by James McMurtry
- Released: September 6, 2005
- Recorded: 2005, Flashpoint Recording, Austin, TX
- Genres: Country, Americana
- Length: 59:28
- Label: Compadre
- Producer: James McMurtry

James McMurtry chronology
| Live in Aught-Three (2004) | Childish Things (2005) | Just Us Kids (2008) |

Professional ratings
Review scores
| Source | Rating |
|---|---|
| AllMusic | 3.5/5 stars |

Childish Things is a 2005 album by singer-songwriter James McMurtry (see 2005 in music). It was awarded the 2006 Americana Music Association Album of the Year Award. The song "We Can't Make It Here" was named the best song of the 2000s decade by music critic Robert Christgau.

== Track listing ==
1. "See the Elephant" (McMurtry) – 4:27
2. "Childish Things" (McMurtry)– 4.35
3. "We Can't Make It Here" (McMurtry) – 7:04
4. "Slew Foot" (featuring Joe Ely; written by Howard Hausey and James C. Webb) – 4:23
5. "Bad Enough" (McMurtry) – 4:32
6. "Restless" (McMurtry) – 3:52
7. "Memorial Day" (McMurtry) – 4:16
8. "Six Year Drought" (McMurtry) – 5:12
9. "Old Part of Town" (written by Peter Case) – 5:35
10. "Charlemagne's Home Town" (McMurtry) – 5:53
11. "Pocatello" (McMurtry) – 3:09
12. "Holiday" (McMurtry) – 6:30

== Personnel ==
- James McMurtry: lead vocal, acoustic and electric guitars, baritone guitar, mandolin, harmonica, piano, organ
- Ronnie Johnson: bass guitar, backing vocals
- Tim Holt: guitars
- David Grissom: guitars
- Daren Hess: drums, tambourine
- Bukka Allen: piano, organ
- Warren Hood: violin
- Jon Blondell: trombone
- Curtis McMurtry: saxophone
- Randy Garibay, Jr.: backing vocals
- Joe Ely: Co-lead vocal on "Slew Foot"
- Chris Maresh: bass guitar on "Holiday"

== Chart performance ==
| Chart (2005) | Peak position |
|---|---|
| U.S. Billboard Top Country Albums | 47 |
| U.S. Billboard Top Heatseekers | 28 |
| U.S. Billboard Top Independent Albums | 40 |
