= The Horses and the Hounds =

Studio album by James McMurtry
- Released: August 20, 2021
- Studios: Jackson Browne's Groovemasters (Santa Monica); Infinitespin (Van Nuys); Arlyn (Austin); The Zone (Dripping Springs)
- Length: 47:23
- Label: New West
- Producer: Ross Hogarth

James McMurtry chronology
Complicated Game (2015)	The Horses and the Hounds (2021)

The Horses and the Hounds is the tenth studio album by American singer James McMurtry. It was released on August 20, 2021, through New West Records.

== Critical reception ==
According to Metacritic, The Horses and the Hounds has a score of 81 out of 100, indicating that it has received "universal acclaim" from music critics. In Paste, Geoffrey Himes wrote that "on this record, McMurtry sings in the first person as if he were an old man phoning from Canada to an old friend who had briefly been a lover; as if he were a mentally unbalanced man who shoots his best friend for no good reason; as if he were a homeless truck driver living in a series of motels; as if he were a husband with a flat tire, an angry wife and no internet. None of those characters are him, but he’s such a good actor as a singer that it’s easy to believe he is."

Writing for Pitchfork, Stephen M. Deusner said "McMurtry has become what’s known as a songwriter's songwriter: someone whose facility with words and influence on other artists far outstrip his mainstream notoriety and album sales". Deusner stated that The Horses and the Hounds saw McMurtry focus on "his favorite subjects", and that "McMurtry sounds more engaged here, more focused, and more generous to his hard-luck characters".

Slant writer Jeremy Winograd opined that "McMurtry has always been a superb, instinctive storyteller, using his characters as conduits to get at more profound truth than a more diaristic lyricist might", and that The Horses and the Hounds not only features "no shortage of great stories", but details that "betray a self-aware preoccupation with aging that lend the album a more endearingly personal bent than his previous efforts".

== Track listing ==
The Horses and the Hounds track listing
No.	Title	Writer(s)	Length
1.	"Canola Fields"	James McMurtry	4:50
2.	"If It Don't Bleed"	McMurtry	3:50
3.	"Operation Never Mind"	McMurtry	4:34
4.	"Jackie"	McMurtry	5:08
5.	"Decent Man"	McMurtry	4:49
6.	"Vaquero"	McMurtry	4:41
7.	"The Horses and the Hounds"	McMurtry; David Grissom	4:38
8.	"Ft. Walton Wake Up Call"	McMurtry; Cornbread; Daren Hess	5:17
9.	"What's the Matter"	McMurtry	4:27
10.	"Blackberry Winter"	McMurtry; Ross Hogarth	5:09
Total length:			47:23

== Personnel ==
Credits adapted from the album's liner notes.

Musicians

- James McMurtry – vocals (all tracks), acoustic guitar (tracks 1, 6, 8)
- David Grissom – electric guitars (tracks 1, 6–8), acoustic guitars (1, 6, 7), acoustic guitar solo (1), guitars (2–5, 9, 10), mando-guitar solo (9)
- Darren Hess – drums
- Sean Hurley – bass guitar
- Kenny Aronoff – percussion
- Loren Gold – piano (all tracks), organ (3)
- Randy Garibay Jr. – harmony vocals (1, 2, 6, 9, 10)
- Harry Smith – mandolin (1, 10), banjo (1), slide guitar (2)
- Red Young – organ (1, 3, 6)
- Harmoni Kelley – harmony vocals (1, 3, 10)
- John Gilutin – additional keyboards (1, 8, 10), keyboards (4), piano (6)
- Betty Soo – harmony vocals (1, 5, 7, 9, 10), background vocals (8)
- Charlie Sexton – high-strung guitar (1, 6), cümbüş (7), additional mando-guitar (9), bouzouki (10)
- John McFee – banjo (1)
- Bukka Allen – organ (2, 3, 5, 8, 10), accordion (6, 8), keyboards (8)
- Stan Lynch – percussion (2)
- Cameron Stone – cello (4, 8)
- Akina Adderley – harmony vocals (5, 7), background vocals (8)
- Stephen Barber – Wurlitzer (5), piano (10)

Technical

- Ross Hogarth – production, mixing, recording
- Pat Manske – additional recording
- Joseph Holguin – additional recording
- Kevin Smith – engineering assistance
- Joseph Holguin – engineering assistance
- Peter Brownlee – engineering assistance
- Richard Dodd – mastering
- Marc Harkness – art direction, illustration
- Mary Keating-Bruton – photos

== Charts ==
Chart (2021)	Peak position
US Heatseekers Albums (Billboard)	3
US Top Album Sales (Billboard)	10
US Top Country Albums (Billboard)	29
US Americana/Folk Albums (Billboard)	8
US Top Rock Albums (Billboard)	41

== Release history ==
Release dates and formats for The Horses and the Hounds
Region	Date	Version	Label	Ref.
Various	August 20, 2021	Digital download; streaming	New West Records	
