= Complicated Game =

Studio album by James McMurtry
- Released: 24 February 2015
- Recorded: 2015
- Genre: Americana
- Length: 55:21
- Label: Complicated Game Records
- Producers: Mike Napolitano; C.C. Adcock

James McMurtry chronology
Just Us Kids (2008)	Complicated Game (2015)	The Horses and the Hounds (2021)

Complicated Game is the ninth studio album by American folk rock musician James McMurtry, released on February 24, 2015, by Complicated Game Records.

== Critical reception ==
Professional ratings
Aggregate scores
Source	Rating
Metacritic	87/100
Review scores
Source	Rating
AllMusic	4/5 stars
American Songwriter	4.5/5 stars
Mojo	4/5 stars
Paste	9.0/10
PopMatters	8/10
Robert Christgau	A link
Slant Magazine	4.5/5 stars

According to Metacritic, Complicated Game has a score of 87 out of 100, indicating that it has received "universal acclaim" from music critics.

== Track listing ==
No.	Title	Length
1.	"Copper Canteen"	4:37
2.	"You Got to Me"	5:23
3.	"Ain't Got a Place"	2:41
4.	"She Loves Me"	3:01
5.	"How'm I Gonna Find You Now"	4:03
6.	"These Things I've Come to Know"	3:18
7.	"Deaver's Crossing"	4:00
8.	"Carlisle's Haul"	7:13
9.	"Forgotten Coast"	3:34
10.	"South Dakota"	5:03
11.	"Long Island Sound"	6:47
12.	"Cutter"	5:41

== Charts ==
Chart (2015)	Peak position
US Billboard 200	102
US Americana/Folk Albums (Billboard)	4
US Independent Albums (Billboard)	9
US Top Rock Albums (Billboard)	18
