= Mountain Home (album) =

Studio album by Owen Temple
- Released: 2011
- Recorded: Austin, Texas, 2010
- Genre: Country
- Length: 33:33
- Label: El Paisano
- Producer: Gabriel Rhodes

Owen Temple chronology
Dollars and Dimes (2009)	Mountain Home (2011)	Stories They Tell (2013)

Professional ratings
Review scores
Source	Rating
Hyperbolium	5/5 stars

Mountain Home is the sixth album by American singer/songwriter Owen Temple. It was released on April 26, 2011 on El Paisano Records and on April 22, 2011 on Blue Rose Records in the UK and the European Union. The songs on the album focus on small Texas towns and the eccentrics inhabiting them.

== Track listing ==
All songs (Temple) except where noted

1. "Mountain Home" – 2:52
2. "Desdemona" – 3:07
3. "Medicine Man" (Temple, Adam Carroll, Gordy Quist) – 3:50
4. "Small Town" – 2:57
5. "Danger and Good Times" (Temple, Adam Carroll, Scott Nolan)– 3:35
6. "Fall in Love Every Night" – 3:25
7. "Jacksboro Highway" – 3:41
8. "Old Sam" (Temple, Adam Carroll)– 3:22
9. "Prince of Peace" (Leon Russell, Greg Dempsey)– 3:58
10. "One Day Closer to Rain" – 2:51

== Personnel ==
=== Musicians ===
- Owen Temple - Vocals, Acoustic
- Charlie Sexton - Baritone guitar, bass
- Gabriel Rhodes - Acoustic, Tenor guitar, Banjo, Piano, Dobro
- Rick Richards - Drums, Percussion
- Brian Standefer - Cello
- Bukka Allen - Piano
- Tommy Spurlock - Pedal steel guitar
- Adam Carroll - Harmonica
- Gordy Quist - Harmony vocals
- Jamie Wilson - Harmony vocals

=== Production ===
- Produced and Engineered by Gabriel Rhodes
- Recorded at Sunbird Studios, Austin, Texas

== Releases ==
Year	Format	Label	Catalog #
2011	CD	El Paisano Records	EPR CD 650182
