= Chip Young =

American guitarist and producer (1938–2014)

Chip Young (born Jerry Marvin Stembridge, May 19, 1938 – December 20, 2014) was an American session guitarist, and later record producer who worked primarily out of Nashville, Tennessee.

== Biography ==
Chip Young was born Jerry Marvin Stembridge in Atlanta, Georgia, and was famous for his thumb-style guitar picking. Young played on records by Eddy Arnold, Bobby Bare, J. J. Cale, Guy Clark, Skeeter Davis, Waylon Jennings, George Jones, Kris Kristofferson, Jerry Lee Lewis, Charlie Louvin, Charlie McCoy, Ronnie Milsap, Willie Nelson, the Oak Ridge Boys, Dolly Parton, Carl Perkins, Elvis Presley, Charley Pride, Leon Russell, Earl Scruggs, Nancy Sinatra, Tanya Tucker, Tony Joe White, and many more.

== Young 'Un Sound ==
In 1968, Young built his own recording studio, Young 'Un Sound, on the outskirts of Murfreesboro, Tennessee, about 35 miles southeast of Nashville. In 1975, Young established a Nashville studio for Young 'Un Sound when he purchased the Monument Recording Studios. The Young 'Un Sound studios in Nashville were operational until 1988, then were purchased by Albert Jolson, Jr., to become Masterlink Studios.

== Discography ==
- Jesus Was a Capricorn, Kris Kristofferson, 1972
- Breakaway, Kris Kristofferson and Rita Coolidge, 1974
- Jolene, Dolly Parton, 1974
- Night Things, Ronnie Milsap, 1975
- Joe Ely, Joe Ely, 1977
- Honky Tonk Masquerade, Joe Ely, 1978
- Feel the Fire, Reba McEntire, 1980
- Heart to Heart, Reba McEntire, 1981
- One of a Kind, Moe Bandy, 1982
- Unlimited, Reba McEntire, 1982
- Bobbie Sue, The Oak Ridge Boys, 1982
- Behind the Scene, Reba McEntire, 1983
- American Made, The Oak Ridge Boys, 1983
- Just a Little Love, Reba McEntire, 1984
- Island in the Sea, Willie Nelson, 1987
- Just One Love, Willie Nelson, 1995
- Twistable, Turnable Man, a tribute album to Shel Silverstein, 2010

== Producer and engineer discography ==
- I Can Help, Billy Swan, 1974
- I Came to Hear the Music, Mickey Newbury, 1974
- Joe Ely, Joe Ely, 1977
- Honky Tonk Masquerade, Joe Ely, 1978
- Gene Summers in Nashville, Gene Summers, 1980
- Hard Country, Michael Martin Murphey, 1981
