= Road prison =

Type of prison in Russia

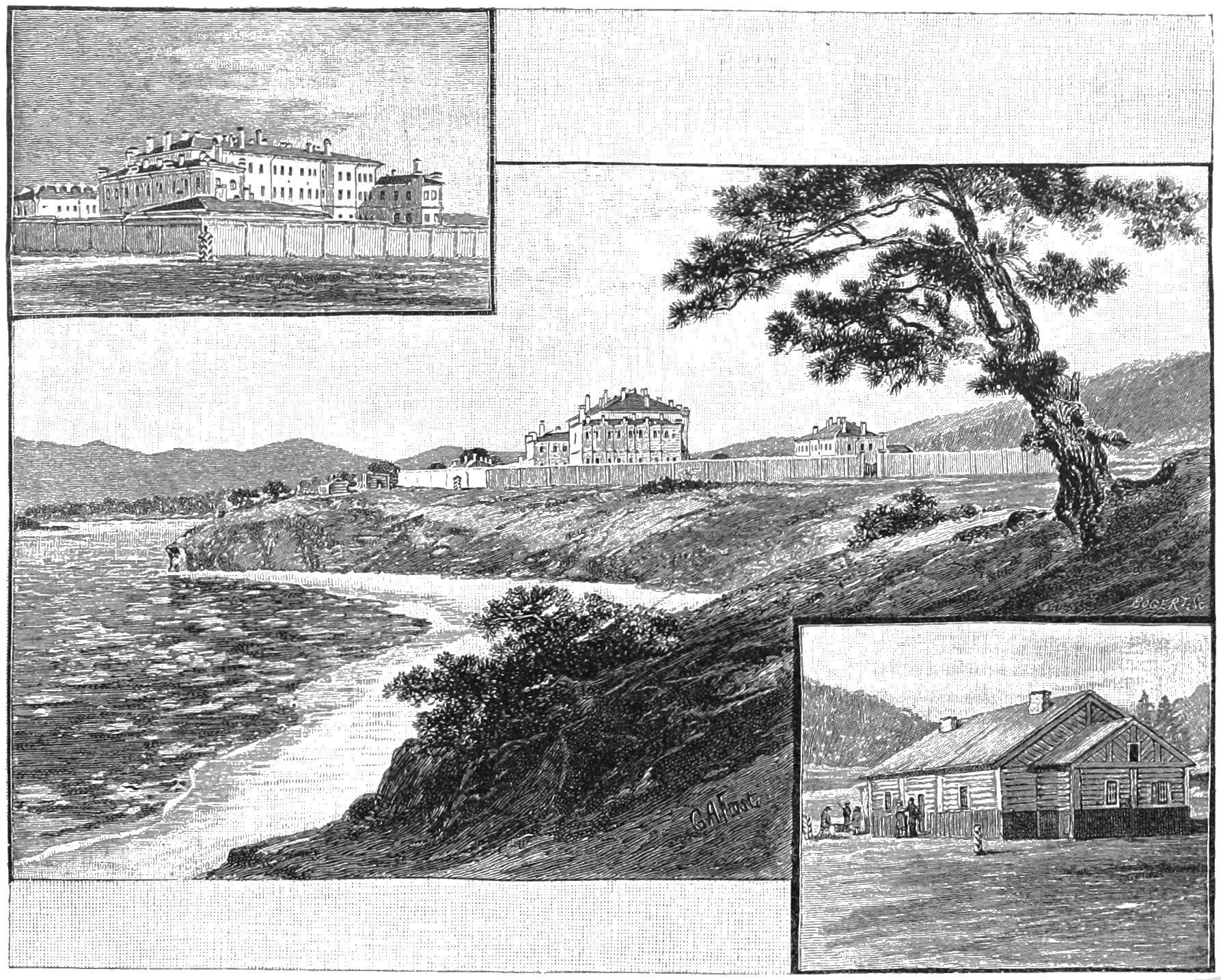
Various Transbaikal Étapes.

Road prisons, or étapes (Russian: этап, from French: étape) were a type of a prison in Russia, used to temporarily house inmates on their way to Siberia, Sakhalin Island, or other places of far-off detention. Étapes were spaced every 40 and 65 kilometres (25 and 40 miles) along a road, each with its own detachment of soldiers. This temporary imprisonment system stretched from the 18th century, at the birth of the Russian Empire, to more modern times in the Soviet Union, and for some, arguably to the modern era.

== Criticism ==
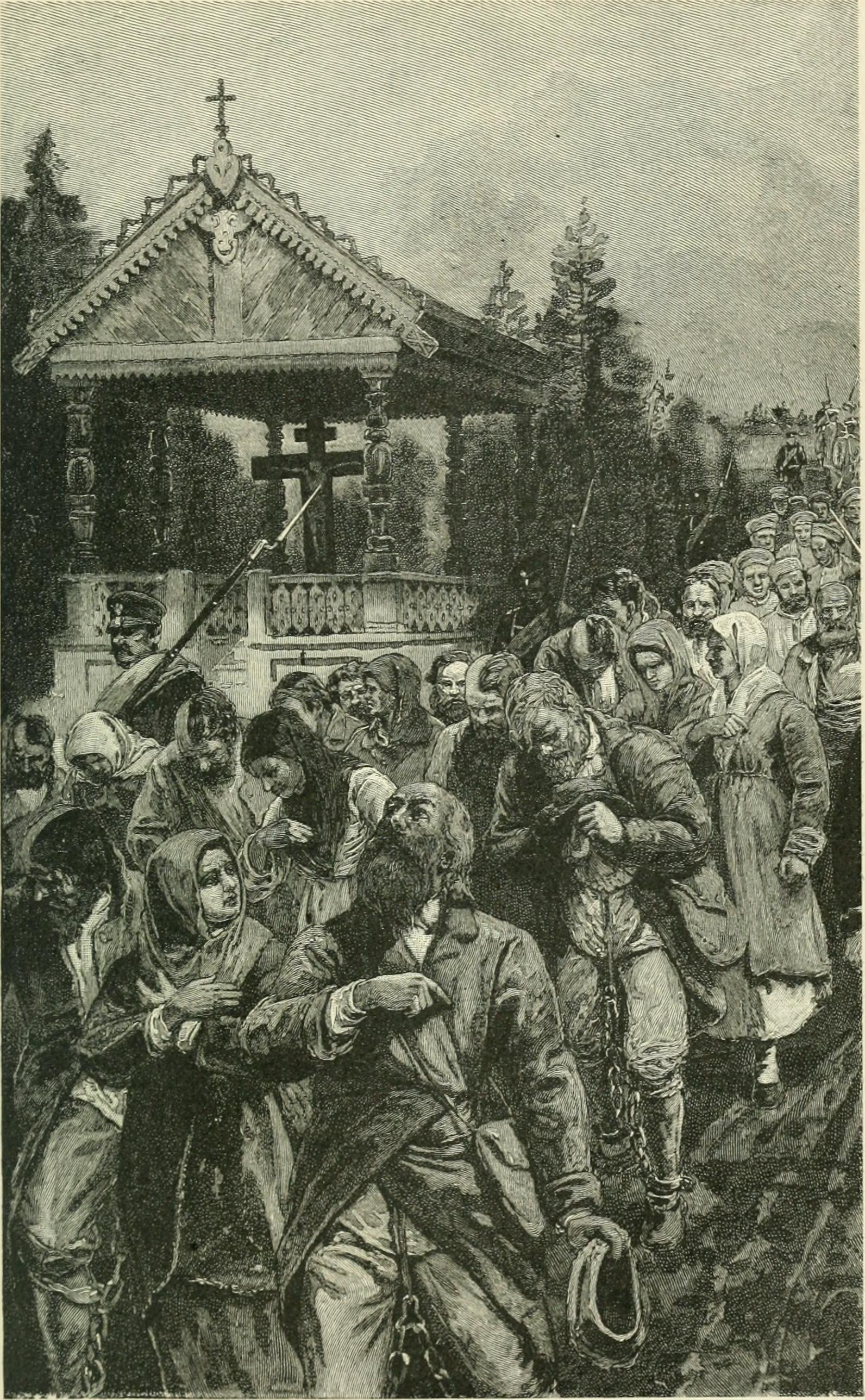
The inhumanity of the étapes

Side-lights on Siberia is an 1898 book.

One modern writer calls the étapes "a form of punishment in and of itself. Its purpose seems to be to break down prisoners' will. [...] There really isn't any objective reason why prisoners would have to be moved very long distances from their homes – thousands of miles away – to other facilities, where it would be hard for family to visit them."

In one incident, a Russian soldier requested to see his wife, and the Russian government responded by arresting her, binding her in chains, and forcing her to walk thousands of kilometres as part of a Siberian prisoner contingent, living among the étapes, "maimed, insulted, violated". The prisoners' temporary allotment is "a dog-kennel, a stable, a black hole – anything but a place to live in".

One author for the Fortnightly Review said that everything is expensive at the étapes "except the human body", as prison guards were often involved in selling liquor, tea, cards, and other assorted vices to prisoners traveling to their final destination. This author made numerous other points similar to those of other Russian prison critics: rotten building materials, absence of any heat, lack of any bedding, absolute filth, and possibility for any prisoner to break out by merely twisting the tin bars holding them in their prison and away from absolute desperation in the wilderness.

Astrakhan to Moscow was a three to six-month journey. When prisoners could not be grouped together fast enough, they were left to languish in the étapes until enough prisoners could be gathered, and then they were forced to march between 3,200 and 7,600 kilometres (2,000 and 4,700 miles).

One critic, E.B. Lanin, has described these prisons as "the most miserable lodgings any class of human beings has ever yet been housed in".
