= Lord of the Highway =

Studio album by Joe Ely
- Released: 1987
- Genres: Country rock; roots rock
- Label: HighTone
- Producer: Joe Ely

Joe Ely chronology
Hi-Res (1984)	Lord of the Highway (1987)	Dig All Night (1988)

Lord of the Highway is an album by the American musician Joe Ely, released in 1987. It had been three and a half years since his previous album, during which time he recorded an unreleased album for MCA Records, assembled a new band, and toured. Ely supported the album with a North American tour.

== Production ==
Ely considered the album to be merely recorded (on an 8-track, at Ely's home), not produced. The title track and "Row of Dominoes" were written by Butch Hancock. Bobby Keys played saxophone on the album; David Grissom played guitar. The CD version of Lord of the Highway includes "Screaming Blue Jillions" as the 11th track.

== Critical reception ==
Professional ratings
Review scores
Source	Rating
AllMusic	3.5/5 stars
Chicago Sun-Times	3.5/4 stars
Robert Christgau	B+
The Encyclopedia of Popular Music	4/5 stars
The Gazette	7.9/10
New Musical Express	5/10
Los Angeles Times	3/4 stars
The Philadelphia Inquirer	3/4 stars
Richmond Times-Dispatch	A

Robert Christgau lamented that "a decade of being told what a hot shit he is has Ely oversinging to signify his intensity." The Los Angeles Times wrote that "Ely's cooked up a tasty rock 'n' roll chili with country flavoring based on much the same recipe as Let it Bleed/Sticky Fingers Stones." The New York Times stated that Ely "hasn't simplified what he sings to fit the rock format; he still prefers lyrics with wry, unheroic twists."

The Chicago Tribune opined that Ely's "tales of hard living and even harder loving work both as true life tales and striking, image-rich fragments of a new American mythology." The Philadelphia Inquirer opined that "Me and Billy the Kid" "is as supple a narrative as Ely has ever constructed." The Philadelphia Daily News listed the album as the ninth best of 1987.

AllMusic noted that "the roots rock sound of Lord of the Highway is much closer to 1981's Musta Notta Gotta Lotta than to Hi-Res. Record Collector determined that Ely's setting is "a cut above standard bar room chugs thanks mainly to the wit of the lyrics."

== Track listing ==
No.	Title	Length
1.	"Lord of the Highway"	3:54
2.	"(Don't Put a) Lock on My Heart"	4:08
3.	"Me and Billy the Kid"	3:23
4.	"Letter to L.A."	8:12
5.	"No Rope, Daisy-O"	0:40
6.	"My Baby Thinks She's French"	3:45
7.	"Everybody Got Hammered"	3:34
8.	"Are You Listenin' Lucky?"	3:19
9.	"Row of Dominoes"	3:37
10.	"Silver City"	4:31
