= Six Hours at Pedernales =

Studio album by Willie Nelson & Curtis Potter
- Released: 1994
- Studio: Pedernales Recording (Spicewood, Texas)
- Genre: Country
- Label: Step One
- Producer: Ray Pennington

Willie Nelson chronology
Moonlight Becomes You (1994)	Six Hours at Pedernales (1994)	Healing Hands of Time (1994)

Six Hours at Pedernales is a studio album by the country singer Willie Nelson and Step One Records co-founder Curtis Potter.

== Critical reception ==
Professional ratings
Review scores
Source	Rating
AllMusic	4.5/5 stars
The Encyclopedia of Popular Music	2/5 stars

Texas Monthly wrote: "Unfortunately, it's full of slick swing, fat synths, flabby snare drums, Potter's Robert Goulet–style crooning ... and there’s no sign of [Nelson's guitar] Trigger."

== Track listing ==
1. "Nothing's Changed, Nothing's New" (Ray Pennington) - 3:46
2. "Chase the Moon" (Sharon Pennington, Jesse Shofner) - 2:27
3. "Are You Sure" (Buddy Emmons, Willie Nelson) - 2:27
4. "The Party's Over" (Willie Nelson) - 2:26
5. "We're Not Talking Anymore" (Mel Holt) - 2:34
6. "Turn Me Loose & Let Me Swing" (Ray Pennington) - 2:51
7. "Once You're Past the Blues" (Mel Holt) - 3:01
8. "It Won't Be Easy" (Don Silvers) - 3:52
9. "Stray Cats, Cowboys, & Girls of the Night" (Jesse Shofner) - 2:43
10. "The Best Worst Thing" (Ray Pennington) - 3:50
11. "It Should Be Easier Now" (Willie Nelson) - 3:20
12. "My Own Peculiar Way" (Willie Nelson) - 2:54

== Personnel ==
- Willie Nelson - Guitar, vocals
- Bobby All - Acoustic guitar
- Roger Ball - Acoustic guitar
- Gene Chrisman - Drums
- Buddy Emmons - Steel guitar
- Gregg Galbraith - Electric guitar
- Rob Hajacos - Fiddle
- Bunky Keels - Piano
- Brent Mason - Electric guitar
- Curtis Potter - Vocals, performer
- Gary Prim - Keyboards
- David Smith - Guitar
- Kristin Wilkinson - Strings
