= Right Here and Now =

Right Here and Now may refer to:

- Right Here and Now (Owen Temple album), 2002
- Right Here and Now (Marcia Hines album), 1994
