= Stories They Tell =

Studio album by Owen Temple
- Released: 2013
- Recorded: 2013; Sunbird Studios, Austin, Texas
- Genre: Country
- Length: 37:33
- Label: El Paisano
- Producer: Gabriel Rhodes

Owen Temple chronology
Mountain Home (2011)	Stories They Tell (2013)	Rings on a Tree (2023)

Stories They Tell is the seventh album by American singer/songwriter Owen Temple. It was released on September 24, 2013 on El Paisano Records.

== Track listing ==
All songs written by Owen Temple, except where noted.

1. "Looking For Signs" – 3:15
2. "Make Something" – 4:03
3. "Big Man" – 3:10
4. "Cities Made of Gold" (Temple, Clay McClinton) – 3:39
5. "Cracking the Code" (Temple, Gordy Quist) – 3:35
6. "Man For All Seasons" – 3:38
7. "Be There Soon" (Temple, Paul Cauthen, David Beck) – 2:47
8. "Homegrown" (Temple, McClinton) – 3:21
9. "Johnson Grass" (Temple, Adam Carroll, A.J. Roach) – 4:13
10. "Stories They Tell" – 2:48
11. "Six Nations Caledonia" (Temple, Quist) – 3:06

== Personnel ==
Musicians

- Owen Temple – vocals, acoustic guitar
- Josh Flowers – bass
- Gabriel Rhodes – acoustic and baritone guitar, mandolin, organ, accordion
- Rick Richards – drums, percussion
- Tommy Spurlock – pedal steel guitar
- Colin Brooks – harmony vocals
- Jamie Wilson – harmony vocals

Additional personnel

- Gabriel Rhodes – production, engineering
- Lance Schriner – art direction, design
- Todd V. Wolfson – photography

== Release history ==
Year	Format	Label	Catalog #
2013	CD	El Paisano Records	EPR CD 650184
