= Moonlight Becomes You =

Moonlight Becomes You may refer to:

- "Moonlight Becomes You" (song), a 1942 popular song by Jimmy Van Heusen and Johnny Burke
- Moonlight Becomes You (album), a 1994 album by Willie Nelson
- Moonlight Becomes You (film), a 1998 TV-movie starring Donna Mills
- Moonlight Becomes You (novel), a 1996 novel by Mary Higgins Clark
- "Moonlight Becomes You...", a 1986 episode of the television series Casualty
- "Moonlight Becomes You", an episode of Leave it to Charlie
