= The Inmates =

British pub rock band

The Inmates are a British pub rock band, which formed after the split of The Flying Tigers in 1977. In 1982, they had a medium-sized international hit with a cover of The Standells' "Dirty Water", and a UK Top 40 hit with their cover of Jimmy McCracklin's track, "The Walk". "Dirty Water" reached number 51 in the United States in January 1980. The song led directly to them recording their debut album, First Offence, produced by Vic Maile for Radar Records. Two further albums were quickly recorded; Shot in the Dark again produced by Vic Maile, and Heatwave in Alaska produced by Stuart Coleman.

Around 1981, lead singer Bill Hurley became ill following a breakdown, and his place was taken for some time by Barrie Masters, who had recently split with Eddie and the Hot Rods. The Inmates continued to record (True Live Stories, a live album recorded by Vic Maile at London's the Venue nightclub and, Five, a studio album again produced by Maile) and tour with Masters until he decided to reform the Hot Rods, and Hurley was well enough to return to fronting the Inmates.

In 1987, The Inmates recorded Meet the Beatles, a live album of Beatles cover versions. It was re-released on CD with bonus cuts including a live version of "Dirty Water".

One of The Inmates' songs, "So Much in Love" (written by Mick Jagger and Keith Richards), was covered by Los Lonely Boys in the mid-1990s.

Another song, "I Can't Sleep" from their debut LP First Offence, was included as a chapter heading in the Stephen King bestseller Christine.

"(I Thought I Heard A) Heartbeat" was recorded by American band Will and the Kill, which included guitarist Will Sexton (brother of Charlie Sexton) and Dr. Feelgood on the album Classic, the last release on Stiff Records. Dr. Feelgood also recorded "Sweet Sweet Lovin'" on their album Fast Women, Slow Horses.

As of 2013, The Inmates were still working and touring, especially in continental Europe. After thirty years, they still have four of the original five band members, and continue to play both original songs and covers.

In 2022, Peter Gunn, the lead guitarist of the Inmates, released a solo album, credited to Peter Gunn & the Neatbloods, entitled Life Savings. This included a guest appearance on drums by Jim Russell.

== Line-up ==
- Bill Hurley - vocals
- Peter Gunn - guitar
- Tony Oliver - guitar
- Ben Donnelly - bass
- Eddie Edwards - drums

Former members

- Jim Russell - drums
- Paul Turner - drums
- Barrie Masters - vocals

== Discography ==
- First Offence (1979) US number 40
- Shot in the Dark (1980)
- Heatwave in Alaska (1981)
- True Live Stories (1984)
- Five (1985)
- Meet the Beatles (1988)
- Fast Forward (1989)
- Inside Out (1991)
- Wanted (1993)
- Silverio (1997)
- Heat of the Night (Live) (2003)
- Back in History (Live) (2008)
