= James McMurtry =

American musician (born 1962)

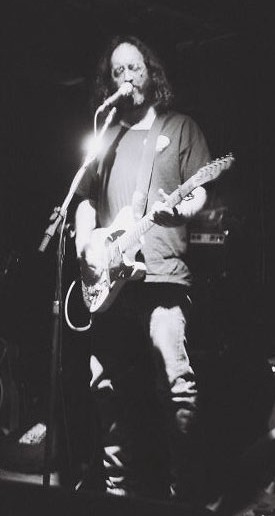
- McMurtry performing in 2005

Background information
- Born: March 18, 1962 (age 64); Fort Worth, Texas, United States
- Origin: Leesburg, Virginia, United States
- Genres: Roots rock; folk rock; alternative country; Americana
- Occupation: Musician
- Instruments: Guitar, vocals
- Years active: 1988–present
- Labels: Columbia; Sugar Hill; New West
- Website: jamesmcmurtry.com

James McMurtry (born March 18, 1962, in Fort Worth, Texas) is an American rock and folk rock/Americana singer, songwriter, guitarist, bandleader, and occasional actor (Daisy Miller, Lonesome Dove, and narrator of Ghost Town: 24 Hours in Terlingua). He performs with veteran bandmates Daren Hess, Cornbread and Tim Holt.

His father, novelist Larry McMurtry, gave him his first guitar at age seven. His mother, an English professor, taught him how to play it: "My mother taught me three chords and the rest I just stole as I went along. I learned everything by ear or by watching people."

== Biography ==
McMurtry spent his first seven years in Fort Worth but was raised mostly in Leesburg, Virginia. He attended the Woodberry Forest School, Orange, Virginia. He began performing in his teens, writing bits and pieces. He started performing his own songs at a downtown beer garden while studying English and Spanish at the University of Arizona in Tucson. After traveling to Alaska and playing a few gigs, he returned to Texas and his father's "little bitty ranch house crammed with 10,000 books". After a time, he left for San Antonio, where he worked as a house painter, actor, bartender, and sometimes singer, performing at writers' nights and open-mic events.

In 1987, a friend in San Antonio suggested McMurtry enter the Kerrville Folk Festival New Folk songwriter contest; he became one of six winners that year. Also around this time John Mellencamp was starring in a film based on a script by McMurtry's father, which gave McMurtry the opportunity to send a demo tape to Mellencamp. Mellencamp subsequently served as co-producer on McMurtry's debut album, Too Long in the Wasteland (1989). McMurtry also appeared on the soundtrack of the film Falling from Grace, working with Mellencamp, John Prine, Joe Ely and Dwight Yoakam in a "supergroup" called Buzzin' Cousins.

McMurtry released follow-up albums Candyland (1992) and Where'd You Hide the Body (1995). 1997 saw the release of "It Had to Happen" which included a cover of "Wild Man from Borneo" originally done by Kinky Friedman and "Sixty Acres"; a rollicking tune about a dead grandma and the events afterwards.

Walk Between the Raindrops followed in 1998 and 2002 brought St. Mary of the Woods. In April 2004, McMurtry released a tour album called Live in Aught-Three. "Choctaw Bingo", one of McMurtry's most popular songs, is featured on both St. Mary of the Woods and Live in Aught-Three.

In 2005, McMurtry released his first studio album in three years. Childish Things again received high critical praise, winning the song and album of the year at the 5th Annual Americana Music Awards in Nashville, Tennessee. The album was perhaps McMurtry at his most political, as his working-class anthem "We Can't Make It Here" included direct criticism of George W. Bush, the Iraq War, and Wal-Mart. The music critic Robert Christgau ranked "We Can't Make It Here" as the best song of the 2000s.

McMurtry released his follow-up album to Childish Things in April 2008. Just Us Kids continued with the previous album's political themes and included the song "Cheney's Toy," McMurtry's most direct criticism of George W. Bush so far. Like "We Can't Make It Here" from the previous album, "Cheney's Toy" was made available as a free Internet download.

McMurtry's ninth album, Complicated Game was released on February 24, 2015 on an L.A. record label also named Complicated Game. The album achieved critical acclaim, scoring 87 on Metacritic. Lead single "How’m I Gonna Find You Now" and other tracks such as album opener "Copper Canteen" have become staples in the McMurtry canon.

Cold and Bitter Tears: The Songs of Ted Hawkins, released in late 2015 on Austin-based Eight 30 Records, includes McMurtry's take on the late busker's song "Big Things". Additionally, Dreamer: A Tribute to Kent Finlay, released in early 2016 (also on Eight 30 Records), features McMurtry's version of Finlay's "Comfort's Just a Rifle Shot Away."

McMurtry contributed his rendition of Adam Carroll's "Screen Door" to Highway Prayer: A Tribute to Adam Carroll (Eight 30 Records, 2016) as well as "Grandpa's Promise" to the satirical album Floater: A Tribute to the Tributes to Gary Floater (Eight 30 Records, 2018). Also in 2018 McMurtry performed at the Vancouver Folk Music Festival.

During restrictions on touring and live music imposed by the COVID-19 pandemic in the United States, McMurtry started streaming several live acoustic performances a week on Facebook and YouTube. After using this platform to premiere new songs including "If It Don't Bleed", a new album, The Horses and the Hounds, was announced on June 9, 2021 and released on August 20. Lead track "Canola Fields" was released to streaming services at the time of the announcement and would go on to get an Americana Music Award nomination. The album, produced by longtime collaborator Russ Hogarth and recorded at Jackson Browne's Santa Monica Groove Masters studio, was reviewed positively, scoring an 81 on Metacritic. Pitchfork reviewer Stephen Deusner said of the record: "McMurtry sounds more engaged here, more focused, and more generous to his hard-luck characters."

McMurtry lives in Lockhart, Texas, 30 miles south of Austin, Texas where, until recently, he and The Heartless Bastards regularly played a midnight set at The Continental Club on Wednesday nights after Jon Dee Graham, another Austin roots rock musician.

McMurtry's son, Curtis, is also a singer-songwriter and has performed with his father.

== Discography ==
=== Albums ===
Year	Album	Chart Positions						Label
Year	Album	US	US Heat	US Indie	US Country	US Folk	US Rock	Label
1989	Too Long in the Wasteland	125						Columbia
1992	Candyland							Columbia
1995	Where'd You Hide the Body							Columbia
1997	It Had to Happen							Sugar Hill
1998	Walk Between the Raindrops							Sugar Hill
2002	Saint Mary of the Woods							Sugar Hill
2004	Live in Aught-Three							Compadre
2005	Childish Things		28	40	47			Compadre
2007	Best of the Sugar Hill Years							Sugar Hill
2008	Just Us Kids	136	2	18				Lightning Rod
2009	Live in Europe		24					Lightning Rod
2015	Complicated Game	102	1	9		4	18	Complicated Game
2021	The Horses and the Hounds		3	35	29	8	41	New West Records
2025	The Black Dog and the Wandering Boy							New West Records

=== Singles ===
Year	Single	Peak positions	Album
Year	Single	US Main. Rock	Album
1989	"Painting by Numbers"	33	Too Long in the Wasteland

=== Guest singles ===
Year	Single	Artist	Peak positions	Album
Year	Single	Artist	US Country	Album
1992	"Sweet Suzanne"	Buzzin' Cousins	68	Falling from Grace soundtrack

=== Music videos ===
Year	Video	Director
1989	"Painting by Numbers"	
1992	"Sweet Suzanne" (Buzzin' Cousins)	Marty Callner
1995	"Levelland"	Linda Feferman
1995	"Lost in the Backyard"	Pip Johnson
1995	"Right Here Now"	
1995	"Down Across the Delaware"	
1995	"Rachel's Song"	
1995	"Fuller Brush Man"	
2014	"How'm I Gonna Find You Now"	Matthew Wilkinson
2015	"Forgotten Coast"	Thierry Vivier

Awards
Preceded by Buddy Miller	AMA Album of the Year (artist); 2006	Succeeded by Patty Griffin
Preceded by Mark Heard	AMA Song of the Year (Songwriter); 2006	Succeeded by Darrell Scott
