= Joe Ely (album) =

Studio album by Joe Ely
- Released: January 1977
- Studios: Young 'Un Sound, Murfreesboro, Tennessee
- Genre: Country rock
- Length: 32:10
- Label: MCA
- Producer: Chip Young

Joe Ely chronology
Joe Ely (1977)	Honky Tonk Masquerade (1978)

Singles from Joe Ely
- 1. "All My Love" Released: December 1976; 2. "Gambler's Bride" Released: March 1977; 3. "She Never Spoke Spanish To Me" Released: October 1978

Professional ratings
Review scores
Source	Rating
AllMusic	4.5/5 stars
Christgau's Record Guide	A−
Dirty Linen	(favorable)

Joe Ely is the 1977 debut album by Texas singer-songwriter Joe Ely. The album includes several tracks written by Ely's bandmates in the Flatlanders.

Joe Ely and the follow-up album, Honky Tonk Masquerade, helped establish Ely as a solo artist. Although the reissued CD doesn't credit Ely's backing musicians, the original LP included a one-page insert containing lyrics and musician credits. The core of the backing band that Ely had assembled for his debut was the same Lubbock-based crack team that appeared with him the following year on Honky Tonk Masquerade and continued to follow him on the road until 1982.

Years later Ely would recall that the band had not initially made plans for a recording career:

"We had recorded some songs at [Don] Caldwell's studio," Ely said. "Don took that tape to Jerry Jeff Walker, and Jerry Jeff recorded one of the songs and played it for a guy with MCA Records. Then one night in 1975 at the Cotton Club, an A&R guy with MCA asked, 'Do y'all want to make some records?'"

"I told him we'd sure never planned on it. But we hadn't planned anything else either, so why not?"

== Track listing ==
All tracks composed by Joe Ely except where indicated.

Side 1

1. "I Had My Hopes Up High" – 3:32
2. "Mardi Gras Waltz" – 2:50
3. "She Never Spoke Spanish to Me" (Butch Hancock) – 3:34
4. "Gambler's Bride" – 2:35
5. "Suckin' a Big Bottle of Gin" (Butch Hancock) – 3:15

Side 2

6. "Tennessee's Not the State I'm In" (Butch Hancock) – 3:04
7. "If You Were a Bluebird" (Butch Hancock) – 2:59
8. "Treat Me Like a Saturday Night" (Jimmie Dale Gilmore) – 3:02
9. "All My Love" – 3:09
10. "Johnny Blues" – 4:10

== Personnel ==
The following credits are summarized from track-by-track credits listed in the album's liner notes.

=== Musicians ===
- Bass – Gregg Wright
- Drums – Steve Keeton
- Piano, electric piano, clavinet, organ – Bobby Emmons
- Electric guitars – Joe Ely, Rick Hulett, Jesse Taylor, Chip Young
- Acoustic guitars – Ray Edenton, Joe Ely, Rick Hulett, Lloyd Maines, Chip Young
- Gut-string guitar, 12-string guitar – Jesse Taylor
- F-hole guitar – Ray Edenton
- Steel guitar – Lloyd Maines
- Dobros – Rick Hulett, Jesse Taylor
- Slide dobro – Joe Ely ("Treat Me Like A Saturday Night")
- Harmonica – Joe Ely
- Percussion – Farrell Morris
- Horns – The Muscle Shoals Group
- Trumpet – Harrison Callaway
- Tenor saxophone – Harvey Thompson
- Baritone saxophone – Ron Eades
- Trombone – Charles Rose
- Vocal harmonies – Joe Ely ("Johnny Blues"), Rick Hulett ("Mardi Gras Waltz", "She Never Spoke Spanish", "Tennessee", "All My Love")

=== Production ===
- Recorded at Young 'Un Sound Studios, Murfreesboro, Tennessee
  - Engineer – Chip Young
- Mastered at MCA Recording Studio, Universal City, California
  - Mastering Engineer – Larry Boden

=== Artwork ===
- Cover illustration – Paul Milosevich
- Back cover photo (of Ely and band in cafe) – Jim Eppler

== Releases ==
The album was digitally remastered and released on CD and cassette in 1991. In 2000, a remastered edition of Ely's first two albums (Joe Ely and Honky Tonk Masquerade) were released together on a single disk. Dirty Linen reported that this disk was especially worth seeking out since it was (at least at the time), "the only place on two continents you can get Ely's debut." The reviewer described Ely's first two albums together: "Ely's self-titled effort and HTM are a bit leaner than most of his other honky-tonk rockers, with a bit more piano than electric guitar backing his lonesome warble -- dry and forceful as the wind whistling through Waco."

year	format	record company	catalog number
1977	LP	MCA	2808
	LP	MCA	2242
	CD	MCA	1-219
1991	Cassette	MCA	MCAC-10219
1991	CD	MCA	MCAD-10219
2000	CD	Beat Goes On (BGO)	BGOCD502
