= Two Thousand Miles =

Studio album by Owen Temple
- Released: 2008
- Recorded: Austin, Texas, January 2007
- Genre: Country
- Length: 38:08
- Label: El Paisano
- Producer: Lloyd Maines

Owen Temple chronology
| Right Here and Now (2002) | Two Thousand Miles (2008) | Dollars and Dimes (2009) |

Professional ratings
Review scores
| Source | Rating |
|---|---|
| Allmusic | 3.5/5 stars |
| Americana Roots | |
| Maverick Magazine (UK) | 4/5 stars |
| Midwest Record | |
| No Depression | |

Two Thousand Miles is the fourth album by American singer/songwriter Owen Temple. It was released in 2008 on El Paisano Records.

== Track listing ==
All tracks are written by Owen Temple except as noted.

| No. | Title | Writer(s) | Length |
|---|---|---|---|
| 1. | "You Want to Wear That Ring" | Temple, Wade Bowen | 3:47 |
| 2. | "Red Wine and Tequila" | | 3:44 |
| 3. | "Swear It Off Again" | | 4:01 |
| 4. | "Two Thousand Miles" | | 3:45 |
| 5. | "Can't Drink Enough to Sing" | Temple, Jay Altizer | 3:51 |
| 6. | "Like We Still Care" | | 4:11 |
| 7. | "I Just Can't Quit Loving You" | | 3:16 |
| 8. | "Demolition Derby" | | 3:19 |
| 9. | "You Don't Have to Be Lonely" | | 4:38 |
| 10. | "The Pluto Blues" | | 4:55 |
| 11. | "Rivers Run From Many Waters" | | 5:30 |
| 12. | "On the Lonesome Road" | | 3:23 |

== Credits ==
=== Musicians ===
- Owen Temple - Acoustic and Electric guitar, Harmonica
- Lloyd Maines - Electric guitar, Pedal steel, Mandolin, Dobro
- David Grissom - Electric guitar
- Glenn Fukunaga - bass, upright bass
- Riley Osbourn - Hammond B3 organ
- Richard Bowden - Fiddle
- David Sanger - Drums
- Gordy Quist - Harmony vocals on "You Want to Wear That Ring," "Can't Drink Enough to Sing," "You Don't Have to be Lonely," and "The Pluto Blues"
- Terri Hendrix Harmony vocals on "Two Thousand Miles," "Demolition Derby," and "Like We Still Care"
- Bob Livingston - Harmony vocals on "Red Wine and Tequila," "Swear It Off Again," "Can't Quit Loving You," "On the Lonesome Road," and "Rivers Run From Many Waters"

=== Production ===
- Produced by Lloyd Maines
- Engineered by Cris Burns
- Recorded at Bismeaux Studio, Austin, Texas

=== Artwork ===
- Art Direction/Design by Shauna Dodds
- Photography by Eric Ryan Anderson
- Photography by Todd V. Wolfson

== Charts ==
| date | chart | position |
|---|---|---|
| 2008 | Freeform American Roots Chart | 11 |
| 2008 | Euro Americana Chart | 18 |
| 2008 | Roots Music Report Chart - Roots Country | 18 |

== Releases ==
| year | format | label | catalog # |
|---|---|---|---|
| 2008 | CD | El Paisano Records / Thirty Tigers | EPR CD 650178 |
