= Too Long in the Wasteland =

Studio album by James McMurtry
- Released: 1989
- Genres: Rock, country, folk
- Label: Columbia
- Producer: John Mellencamp

James McMurtry chronology
Too Long in the Wasteland (1989)	Candyland (1992)

Too Long in the Wasteland is the debut album by the American musician James McMurtry, released in 1989. Its first single was "Painting by Numbers". The album's title was inspired in part by his father's Texas ranch, which is named the Wasteland.

The album peaked at No. 125 on the Billboard 200. McMurtry supported the album by playing some concert dates with Kinky Friedman, and touring with Nanci Griffith.

== Production ==
The album was produced by John Mellencamp (with Michael Wanchic and Larry Crane), who reconnected with McMurtry during the development of Falling from Grace; the film was written by McMurtry's father, Larry McMurtry, who passed along his son's demo tape. The songs were written in Archer City, Texas, and at Mellencamp's studio in Indiana. McMurtry was backed by members of Mellencamp's band, as well as by David Grissom.

The songs are not autobiographical. Many were written to rebut the tendency of popular country music to sentimentalize rural and small-town life.

== Critical reception ==
Professional ratings
Review scores
Source	Rating
AllMusic	4/5 stars
Austin American-Statesman	4.5/5 stars
Robert Christgau	B+
MusicHound Rock: The Essential Album Guide	4/5 stars
The Rolling Stone Album Guide	3.5/5 stars

The Chicago Reader wrote that "McMurtry mainly acts as a dispassionate observer, content to sketch the outlines of a situation and leave its meaning, or his opinion of it, largely up to the listener to infer." Robert Christgau thought that, "like so many singer-songwriters and so many local-colorists, he tends to a soft fatalism, especially when he tries a big statement." Texas Monthly likened McMurtry's "droll" singing to Mark Knopfler's. The Edmonton Journal described the album as "Bruce Springsteen's Nebraska in technicolor."

The New York Times called the album "a collection of 11 dour songs that portray the spiritually desolate lives of people living in America's heartland." Trouser Press concluded that "McMurtry’s lyrics read as riveting poetry, but they’re that much more powerful when heard in the company of a modest hook and a heartland backbeat." The Globe and Mail stated that McMurtry "writes with mordant humor about tiny places in a vast land where suspicion, prejudice and vague threats linger behind the Main Street facades, where choices made in haste are mulled over years later." The Washington Post considered that, "while his singing often takes on the dry, colorless, detached tone of the narrator, his songs are full of sharply drawn tales and three-dimensional characters."

AllMusic noted that McMurtry "has a smooth, low voice that carries a Western twang from his life in Texas." Salon deemed the album full of "catchy and harsh country-folk songs filled with tortured Southern souls failing at love, failing at life or just talking about it in front of the gas station on a country road." The Rolling Stone Album Guide labeled "Terry" "a great, unsentimental lament for a mixed-up rehab bad boy."

== Track listing ==
No.	Title	Length
1.	"Painting by Numbers"
2.	"Terry"
3.	"Shining Eyes"
4.	"Outskirts"
5.	"Song for a Deckhand's Daughter"
6.	"I'm Not from Here"
7.	"Too Long in the Wasteland"
8.	"Crazy Wind"
9.	"Poor Lost Soul"
10.	"Angeline"
11.	"Talkin' at the Texaco"
