= Rings on a Tree =

2023 album by Owen Temple

Studio album by Owen Temple
- Released: 2023
- Recorded: 2022; The Finishing School, Austin, Texas
- Genre: Country
- Length: 59:46
- Label: El Paisano
- Producer: Gordy Quist

Owen Temple chronology
Stories They Tell (2013)	Rings on a Tree (2023)

Rings on a Tree is the eighth album by American singer-songwriter Owen Temple. It was released on September 29, 2023, on El Paisano Records.

== Reception ==
AltCountry noted "a beautiful album" and listed it at No. 7 of all albums released in 2023 "in the 2023 hall of fame."

RootsHighway wrote that the album

closes a long silence and collects material composed with the collaboration of important names of the folk and country scene of the Lone Star State, from Walt Wilkins to Nathan Hamilton, from the late Hal Ketchum to George Ensle and Jamie Lin Wilson, among others, in a journey that covers what we can call 'The Missing Years' quoting the great John Prine, from 2013 to 2023... A very welcome return from Owen Temple, a character who over the years has contributed to making the Texan scene richer and more genuine, a scene which has given authentic emotions to those who are sensitive to 'roots' songwriting.

Earlier in the year, AltCountry wrote that "Owen Temple is an artist with something to say. Socially involved, outraged by abuses in society, concerned about the future of our planet. Urgent themes... A concept album with the central theme of connection with your family and your ancestors – how through them you are rooted in today's time and what your place will be in the world of tomorrow."

Papermoon described it as "a thoughtful and profound work that mixes country and folk."

== Track listing ==
All songs written by Owen Temple, except where noted.

1. "The Song of Us" (Temple, Nathan Hamilton) – 3:53
2. "Watch It Shine" (Temple, Walt Wilkins) – 3:32
3. "Days" (Temple, Wilkins) – 3:47
4. "Beautiful Accidents" (Temple, Kelley Mickwee) – 3:34
5. "Always Becoming" (Temple, Wilkins) – 3:45
6. "Fork in the Road" (Temple, Jamie Lin Wilson) – 4:57
7. "Can't Stop Won't Stop" (Temple) – 7:44
8. "Virginia and Hazel" (Temple, Mickwee) – 4:31
9. "Churches and Cantinas" (Temple, Hal Ketchum) – 2:49
10. "Are We There Yet?" (Temple, Brandon Bolin) – 3:11
11. "Wild Seeds" (Temple, Wilkins) – 2:25
12. "Rings on a Tree" (Temple, George Ensle) – 3:05
13. "More Like September" (Temple, Wilkins) – 3:16
14. "Gentle James" (Temple) – 5:44
15. "Twenty Years" (Temple, Mickwee) – 3:25

== Personnel ==
=== Musicians ===
- Owen Temple – vocals, acoustic guitar
- Josh Flowers – bass
- Gordy Quist – acoustic and electric guitar, harmony vocals
- Geoff Queen – pedal steel and electric guitar, Dobro
- Rick Richards – drums, percussion
- Trevor Nealon – piano, organ
- Noah Jeffries – fiddle, mandolin
- Walt Wilkins – harmony vocals
- Tina Wilkins – harmony vocals

=== Additional personnel ===
- Gordy Quist – production
- Steve Christensen – engineering
- Lance Schriner – art direction, design
- Bruce Alderman – art
- Todd V. Wolfson – photography
- Robert Hensley – photography

== Release history ==
Year	Format	Label	Catalog #
2023	CD	El Paisano Records	EPR CD 650190
2023	LP record	El Paisano Records	EPR LP 650190
