= Teye =

For the Egyptian name see Tiye (disambiguation).

Teye (pronounced tie-ya, born 1957 as Teije Wijnterp) is a Frisian (now American) guitarist, best known for his flamenco guitar work with the Joe Ely band between 1994 and 2000. Before ending his musical career, Teije began building exclusive handmade guitars.

== Biography ==
Teye started learning guitar in 1968, and moved to London to pursue a musical career, unsuccessfully. He returned to the Netherlands and played in a number of rock and roll bands, after which he studied classical guitar at the conservatory in Groningen.

Starting in the early 1980s, he began learning to play flamenco music in Andalusia, and spent the next six years alternately studying in Spain, and studying and performing in the Netherlands and the United States. Teye produced a solo flamenco guitar LP, El Gitano Punky (1988), and studied modern music at the conservatory in Rotterdam from 1990 to 1994. A visit to Austin, Texas, brought him in contact with Joe Ely, who integrated Teye's flamenco guitar into his country-rock band on the 1995 release Letter to Laredo. Teye moved from Sevilla, where he had been living with his soon-to-be wife Belen Oliva Bermudez (a flamenco dancer), to Austin.

In 1996, then living in Austin, Teye and Belen married and started a flamenco ensemble in Austin, Teye & Viva El Flamenco, later called Teye & Belen, releasing a CD in 1999, Viva el Flamenco and one in 2004, "FlamencObsesionArte". He worked with Joe Ely again in 1998, on Twistin' in the Wind.

== Teye Guitars ==
When Teye showed a guitar that he had made to Les Paul, Paul deemed Teye's prototype 'the closest to the ideal guitar I have in my head'. Teye then established himself as builder of electric guitars in 2004. His love for adorned guitars stems from being a longtime Rolling Stones and Faces fan. They played guitars built by Tony Zemaitis, who built two guitars for Teye and subsequently Tony and he became friends. Teye’s La India La Mora and La Perla models earned praise from magazines all over the world. His Electric Gypsy La Llama was praised by Guitar Player as a "dazzling piece of guitar artistry." An unusual feature on some of Teye's older guitars is a "mood" knob, which, to a Guitar Player reviewer, sounded as a mid-cut control (which it is not), and "exponentially" increased the number of tones available. Later in 2015, Teye introduced an even more versatile circuitry, the Mojo(TM). Summer 2016 Players include Andy Summers of the Police; Cliff Williams of AC/DC; Zac Brown; Cade Foehner (American Idol); Bibi McGill (Beyoncé, Pink); Ge Carlsberg and David Hollestelle (Wild Romance); Eric Saylors (The Steepwater Band); Ben Thomas (Adele, Sam Smith); Johnny Depp; Joan Jett and others.
