= Will and the Kill =

American rock band

- Origin: Austin, Texas, United States
- Genres: Rock and roll
- Labels: MCA Records
- Past members: Will Sexton; David Grissom; Alex Napier; Jeff Boaz

Will and the Kill were an American rock band from Austin, Texas.

Will and the Kill's members included Will Sexton, brother of guitarist Charlie Sexton, and David Grissom, later of Storyville. The group released one self-titled album on MCA Records in 1988, which reached #129 on the Billboard 200. A single from the album, "Heart of Steel", peaked at #28 on the Billboard Mainstream Rock Tracks chart. The album was produced by Joe Ely.

== Members ==
- Will Sexton - vocals, guitar
- David Grissom - guitar
- Alex Napier - bass
- Jeff Boaz - drums
