= Choctaw Bingo =

Song by James McMurtry

from the album Saint Mary of the Woods
- Released: 2002
- Genre: Southern rock
- Length: 8:49
- Label: Sugar Hill
- Songwriter: James McMurtry

"Choctaw Bingo" is a southern rock song written and performed by musician James McMurtry. Versions appear on his albums Saint Mary of the Woods and (as live recordings) on Live In Aught Three and Live in Europe. The song uses the narrative of a family reunion in Oklahoma to describe the economic dysfunction of inner America at the time. The sound borrows from Chuck Berry.

== Background ==
According to McMurtry, the song was inspired by things he saw while driving back and forth through Oklahoma on his way to tour in other places. The melody is similar to "You Can't Catch Me", a 1956 song by Chuck Berry.

== Legacy ==
Horror writer Stephen King named "Choctaw Bingo" as one of the songs he would take to a desert island in a 2006 episode of Desert Island Discs.

The song appears on the soundtrack for the movie Beer for My Horses.

In 2009, American writer Ron Rosenbaum, writing for Slate, proposed "Choctaw Bingo" as a new national anthem for the United States. Rosenbaum argued that the themes of the song are more representative of life in a post-financial crash America than "The Star-Spangled Banner."

"Choctaw Bingo" has been covered by Ray Wylie Hubbard on his album, Delirium Tremelos, 2005.

An almost ten-minute long live version of this song appears on McMurtry’s album Live in Europe.
