= Love and Danger (Joe Ely album) =

Studio album by Joe Ely
- Released: 1992
- Label: MCA
- Producer: Tony Brown, Joe Ely

Joe Ely chronology
Live at Liberty Lunch (1990)	Love and Danger (1992)	Chippy (1994)

Love and Danger is an album by the American musician Joe Ely, released in 1992. It marked Ely's return to MCA Records. He supported the album with a North American tour.

== Production ==
Recorded in Nashville, the album was produced by Tony Brown and Ely. Ely and Brown wanted to place emphasis on the songs and Ely's voice, rather than a band sound. Ely had written between 40 and 50 songs over nine months, some inspired by his Texas road travels. David Grissom played guitar on the album. "Every Night About This Time" is a cover of the Dave Alvin song. "The Road Goes On Forever" and "Whenever Kindness Fails" were written by Robert Earl Keen.

== Critical reception ==
Professional ratings
Review scores
Source	Rating
AllMusic	3.5/5 stars
Calgary Herald	B
The Encyclopedia of Popular Music	3/5 stars
The Indianapolis Star	3/4 stars
MusicHound Rock: The Essential Album Guide	3.5/5 stars
Orlando Sentinel	2/5 stars
Spin Alternative Record Guide	4/10

The Chicago Tribune wrote that the album, "bursting with a crazed and dangerous sexual energy, rocks as hard as anything Ely has ever recorded, yet that rootsy Texas twang is never far away, nor is his startling poetic flair." The Guardian noted that "Whenever Kindness Fails" "meshes perfectly with Ely's gruff but ironic delivery." The Los Angeles Times determined that "Ely is taking the outsider/loner's view of love and life, spinning witty, frequently brilliant metaphors ... and setting them to melodies that seem at once familiar and fresh."

The Calgary Herald opined that Ely's "delivery is too intense, like he's trying to be heard over a roadhouse crowd." Stereo Review concluded that "it's got the dynamic locomotion of rock, the righteous sassiness of the blues, the narrative twang of country, and the hook-filled, melodic sheen of pop." The Indianapolis Star wrote that "Ely's America entails bawdy romances, squelched ambitions and lonesome highways." The Orlando Sentinel stated that "the ultra-crisp, hard-rock drum sound here is downright annoying on otherwise worthy songs."

== Track listing ==
No.	Title	Length
1.	"Sleepless in Love"	4:04
2.	"Pins and Needles"	4:16
3.	"Love Is the Beating of Hearts"	4:22
4.	"Slow You Down"	4:27
5.	"The Road Goes On Forever"	4:33
6.	"Settle for Love"	4:25
7.	"Highways and Heartaches"	4:14
8.	"Whenever Kindness Fails"	4:05
9.	"She Collected"	3:42
10.	"Every Night About This Time"	4:11
