= Dollars and Dimes =

Studio album by Owen Temple
- Released: 2009
- Recorded: Austin, Texas, January 2009
- Genre: Country
- Length: 36:36
- Label: El Paisano
- Producer: Gabriel Rhodes

Owen Temple chronology
Two Thousand Miles (2008)	Dollars and Dimes (2009)	Mountain Home (2011)

Professional ratings
Review scores
Source	Rating
Allmusic	4/5 stars
Hyperbolium	4/5 stars

Dollars and Dimes is the fifth album by American singer-songwriter Owen Temple. It was released June 9, 2009, on El Paisano Records. A concept album focused on hard times in different regions of North America, that the Chicago Sun-Times stated "delivers the concept richly".

== Track listing ==
All songs written by Owen Temple except where noted.

1. "Broken Heart Land" (Temple, Jeff Burkhart, Gordy Quist)– 3:32
2. "Black Diamond" (Temple, Adam Carroll, Scott Nolan)– 2:58
3. "Making a Life" (Temple, Quist, Chris Anderson) – 3:38
4. "City of the King" (Temple, Quist, Evan Christian)– 4:15
5. "Dollars and Dimes" (Temple, Carroll)– 3:11
6. "Memphis" – 3:10
7. "Los Angeles" – 2:49
8. "I Don't Want to Do What I Do" (Temple, Carroll)– 3:14
9. "Quiet Look" – 3:15
10. "Golden Age" (Temple, Quist)– 3:35
11. "Winnipeg Waltz" – 3:06

== Personnel ==
=== Musicians ===
- Owen Temple – vocals, acoustic
- Gabriel Rhodes – acoustic, electric guitar, pump organ, piano, ukulele
- Will Sexton – bass, electric guitar, harmony vocals
- Hunt Sales – drums, electric guitar, percussion
- Brian Standefer – cello
- Michael Thompson – piano
- Adam Carroll – harmonica

=== Production ===
- Produced by Gabe Rhodes
- Engineered by Cris Burns
- Recorded at Bumshoe Music Services, Austin, Texas

=== Artwork ===
- Art direction/design by Lance Schriner
- Photography by Jonathan Lurie
- Photography by Philip Albert Shane

== Charts ==
Chart (2009)	Peak position
Freeform American Roots Chart	5
Euro Americana Chart	1

== Releases ==
Year	Format	Label	Catalog #
2009	CD	El Paisano Records	EPR CD 650181
