= Just One Love =

Studio album by Willie Nelson
- Released: 1995
- Genre: Country
- Length: 38:13
- Label: Justice
- Producer: Grady Martin

Willie Nelson chronology
| Healing Hands of Time (1994) | Just One Love (1995) | Augusta (1995) |

Just One Love is a studio album by the American country singer Willie Nelson, released in 1995. Ten of the songs are covers of pre-rock 'n' roll country and honky tonk.

Just One Love includes two duets with Kimmie Rhodes. "Eight More Miles to Louisville" is a cover of the Grandpa Jones song.

== Critical reception ==
Professional ratings
Review scores
| Source | Rating |
|---|---|
| AllMusic | 3/5 stars |
| The Encyclopedia of Popular Music | 3/5 stars |
| Entertainment Weekly | B |
| The Indianapolis Star | 3/4 stars |

Entertainment Weekly wrote that the album finds Nelson "veering between simple elegance and somnambulism." The Washington Post deemed it "a superb, old-fashioned honky-tonk album."

== Track listing ==
1. "Just One Love" (Kimmie Rhodes) - 4:03
2. "Each Night at Nine" (Floyd Tillman)- 2:21
3. "This Cold Cold War with You" (Floyd Tillman)- 2:52
4. "Better Left Forgotten" (Chip Young)- 3:05
5. "It's a Sin" (Fred Rose, Zeb Turner) - 2:02
6. "Four Walls" (George Campbell, Marvin Moore) - 4:12
7. "Smoke! Smoke! Smoke! (That Cigarette)" (Merle Travis, Tex Williams) - 2:54
8. "I Just Drove By" (Kimmie Rhodes) - 4:12
9. "Cold, Cold Heart" (Hank Williams) - 3:10
10. "Bonaparte's Retreat" (Pee Wee King, Redd Stewart)- 2:07
11. "Alabam" (Lloyd "Cowboy" Copas) - 2:38
12. "Eight More Miles to Louisville" (Louis "Grandpa" Jones)- 2:16

== Personnel ==
- Willie Nelson – Guitar, vocals
- Ray Edenton – Guitar
- Buddy Emmons – Bass, steel guitar
- Freddy Joe Fletcher – Drums
- Buddy Harman – Drums
- Grandpa Jones – Banjo, vocals
- Lisa Jones – Dulcime
- Mike Leech – Bass
- Grady Martin – Guitar, keyboards
- Bobbie Nelson – Keyboards
- Jody Payne – Guitar
- Kimmie Rhodes – Vocals
- Pete Wade – Guitar
- Chip Young – Guitar
- Eric Paul – Engineer
