= Noëlle Hampton =

American singer-songwriter and composer

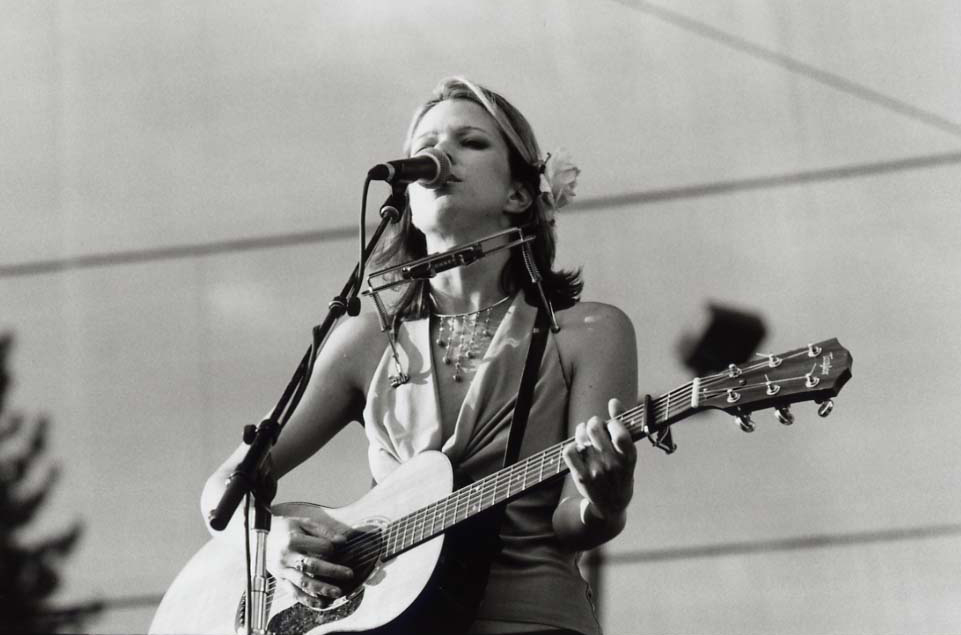
- Hampton performing in 2003
- Born: December 10, 1972 (age 53); Mill Valley, California, U.S.
- Occupations: Singer; songwriter; musician; composer
- Years active: 1993–present
- Spouse: André Moran (m. 2005)
- Musical career
- Genres: Pop; Americana; rock
- Instruments: Vocals; guitar; piano; keyboards; harmonica; percussion; drums
- Website: www.noellehampton.com www.thebellesounds.com

Noëlle Michelle Hampton is an American singer, songwriter, and composer. Her music ranges across the genres of pop, rock and Americana. She is a member of the Texas band the Belle Sounds, formed with longtime music partner and husband, André Moran.

== Early life and education ==
Hampton was born and raised in Mill Valley, California. She began playing guitar and piano at eighteen years old and started performing locally at twenty-one years old in Marin County, California and San Francisco, California at legendary venues such as the Sweetwater Saloon and Slim's. Shortly after graduating high school, she attended San Diego State University and the Blue Bear School of Music in San Francisco.

== Professional career ==
Hampton recorded her first EP in 1995 with producers Adam Berkowitz and Cole Tate in Mill Valley, California. She performed numerous live shows in the San Francisco Bay Area while continuing to write songs and becoming a more experienced live performer. She began receiving airplay on San Francisco based radio stations and the press favorably reviewed her EP and concerts. As Hampton garnered a following she began getting bookings opening concerts for Bob Dylan, Chris Isaak, Wilco and others.

=== Lilith Fair ===
Hampton beat out about 500 other acts in the Lilith Fair contest hosted by radio station Alice 97.3 KLLC in San Francisco, California, in June 1998, earning her an opening performance slot at the Lilith Fair with performing artists Sarah McLachlan, Paula Cole, Natalie Merchant and other female recording artists at the Shoreline Amphitheatre in Mountain View, California on June 24, 1998.

=== California Music Awards ===
Hampton was nominated for Outstanding Female Vocalist at the California Music Awards in 2001. Other nominees were Aimee Mann, Gwen Stefani (No Doubt), Tracy Chapman, and Noe Venable. Stefani won. Hampton performed at the awards ceremony along with Huey Lewis, Sammy Hagar, the Doobie Brothers, Little Feat and others. The ceremony was on Saturday, April 28, 2001, at the Henry J. Kaiser Arena in Oakland, California.

== The Belle Sounds ==
Hampton and Moran moved to Austin, Texas in 2004 and began performing locally. In 2012, they formed the Belle Sounds, a five-piece indie-pop-rock band. Current members are Jim Echels on drums and vocals; Emily Shirley on keyboards, synthesizer, guitar and vocals; and Greg Hagen on bass and vocals. The band's third album, The Sea Within, was released on July 20, 2018. That morning, the band performed on the "Music In The Morning" segment of KTBC-TV Fox 7 Austin's Good Day Austin show. The album received airplay and favorable reviews on Austin radio stations KUTX 98.9 and Sun Radio 101.1. The album and music video for the song, "Like A Villain", received favorable reviews, most notably in Atwood Magazine, BroadwayWorld and Glide Magazine.

In addition to headlining their own shows, the Belle Sounds have performed on bills with artists such as Jerry Jeff Walker, for whom they opened at ACL Live at the Moody Theater in Austin in 2016.

The band was officially acknowledged by the City of Austin and then-mayor Steve Adler with a proclamation declaring April 13, 2017, as "The Belle Sounds Day".

== Film composing and songs in film and television ==
Year	Production	Title	Role
2000	Falling, (The Making Of) (Documentary Short)	Suspended	Writer, performer
2001	Big Love (Short)		Composer
2004	Child Psychology (Short)		Composer
2007	Men in Trees (TV Series)	Here On The Ground	Writer, performer
2010	Private Practice (TV Series)	Here On The Ground	Writer, performer
2010	Army Wives (TV Series)	Thin Line	Writer, performer
2013	Dark Skies (film)	Bourbon On Your Lips	Writer, performer, the Belle Sounds

== Discography ==
Year	Title	Label	Artist(s)	Notes
1995	EP	Independent	Noëlle Hampton	Produced by Adam Berkowitz and Cole Tate
2000	Under These Skies	Independent	Noëlle Hampton	Produced by Noëlle Hampton, André Moran and Chris Daddio
2002	Five For The Road	Independent	Noëlle Hampton	Produced by Noëlle Hampton and André Moran
2008	Thin Line	Independent	Noëlle Hampton	Produced by Mark Hallman
2013	The Belle Sounds	Independent	The Belle Sounds	Produced by Neilson Hubbard
2014	Black Stone	Independent	The Belle Sounds	Produced by Neilson Hubbard
2018	The Sea Within	Independent	The Belle Sounds	Produced by David Boyle
