= Healing Hands of Time =

Studio album by Willie Nelson
- Released: 1994
- Recorded: Capitol (Hollywood)
- Genre: Country
- Length: 36:34
- Label: Capitol
- Producer: Jimmy Bowen

Willie Nelson chronology
| Moonlight Becomes You (1994) | Healing Hands of Time (1994) | Just One Love (1995) |

Healing Hands of Time is the 42nd studio album by country singer Willie Nelson.

Professional ratings
Review scores
| Source | Rating |
|---|---|
| Allmusic | link |

== Track listing ==
All tracks composed by Willie Nelson, except where indicated.

1. "Funny How Time Slips Away" - 5:30
2. "Crazy" - 3:30
3. "Night Life" (Paul Buskirk, Walter Breeland, Nelson) - 3:56
4. "Healing Hands of Time" - 3:45
5. "(How Will I Know) I'm Falling in Love Again" - 4:14
6. "All the Things You Are" (Jerome Kern, Oscar Hammerstein II) - 2:51
7. "Oh, What It Seemed to Be" (Bennie Benjamin, Frankie Carle, George David Weiss) - 3:21
8. "If I Had My Way" (James Kendis, Lou Klein) - 3:23
9. "I'll Be Seeing You" (Irving Kahal, Sammy Fain) - 3:02
10. "There Are Worse Things Than Being Alone" - 4:08

== Personnel ==
- Willie Nelson - guitar, vocals
- Eddie Bayers - drums
- Oscar Brashear - trumpet
- Rosemary Butler - vocals
- David Campbell - arranger, conductor
- Valerie Carter - vocals
- John Clark - flute
- Jonathan Clark - flute, horn, oboe
- Craig Doerge - piano
- Doug Haywood - vocals
- Suzie Katayama - orchestra manager
- Daniel Kelley - horn, French horn
- Michael Lang - piano, soloist
- Arnold McCuller - vocals
- Billy Joe Walker, Jr. - acoustic guitar, guitar
- Glenn Worf - bass guitar
- Reggie Young - electric guitar

== Chart performance ==
=== Weekly charts ===
| Chart (1994) | Peak position |
|---|---|
| Australian Albums (ARIA) | 109 |
| Canadian Country Albums (RPM) | 15 |
| US Billboard 200 | 103 |
| US Top Country Albums (Billboard) | 17 |

=== Year-end charts ===
| Chart (1995) | Position |
|---|---|
| US Top Country Albums (Billboard) | 74 |
