= Honky Tonk Masquerade =

Studio album by Joe Ely
- Released: February 1978
- Recorded: October 17–26, 1977
- Studios: Youngun's, Murfreesboro, Tennessee
- Genre: Country rock
- Length: 33:57
- Label: MCA
- Producer: Chip Young

Joe Ely chronology
Joe Ely (1977)	Honky Tonk Masquerade (1978)	Down on the Drag (1979)

Singles from Joe Ely
- 1. "Fingernails" Released: March 1978; 2. "Honky Tonk Masquerade" Released: May 1978

Honky Tonk Masquerade is the second album by country singer-songwriter Joe Ely, released in 1978.

== Critical acclaim ==
Professional ratings
Review scores
Source	Rating
AllMusic	5/5 stars
Christgau's Record Guide	A
Dirty Linen	(favorable)
MusicHound Folk: The Essential Album Guide	3/5 stars
Rolling Stone	4.5/5 stars

The Los Angeles Times wrote that "Ely's pure, unadorned vocals and wry, gently philosophical songs revive the Hank Williams-Lefty Frizzell honky-tonk tradition in country music without showing any traces of nostalgia or self-consciousness."

Honky Tonk Masquerade has been highly regarded by critics around the world. It was included in the 2005 book, 1001 Albums You Must Hear Before You Die. Writer Steve Pond places the album at number 40 on Rolling Stone's list of "50 Essential Albums of the 70s", calling it "the decade's most sure-footed country-rock collaboration". Pond places the album in the same class as such 1970s "country landmarks" as Guy Clark's Old No. 1, Willie Nelson's Red Headed Stranger, and Terry Allen's Lubbock (On Everything). In addition, New Zealand critic Fred Muller places the album on his list of the top ten "best albums of the rock era".

== LP track listing ==
All songs by Joe Ely; except as indicated.

=== Side one ===
1. "Cornbread Moon" – 3:29
2. "Because of the Wind" – 4:02
3. "Boxcars" (Butch Hancock) – 4:03
4. "Jericho (Your Walls Must Come Tumbling Down)" (Butch Hancock) – 2:54
5. "Tonight I Think I'm Gonna Go Downtown" (Jimmie Dale Gilmore, John Reed) – 2:12

=== Side two ===
1. "Honky Tonk Masquerade" – 3:46
2. "I'll Be Your Fool" – 2:52
3. "Fingernails" – 2:13
4. "West Texas Waltz" (Butch Hancock) – 5:03
5. "Honky Tonkin'" (Hank Williams) – 3:27

== Personnel ==
Credits as listed in liner notes.

=== Musicians ===
- Joe Ely - vocals, acoustic guitar
- Lloyd Maines - steel guitar
- Steve Keeton - drums
- Gregg Wright - bass
- Ponty Bone - accordion, piano
- Jesse Taylor - acoustic and electric guitar
- Chip Young - acoustic and electric guitar
- John Goldthwaite - electric guitar
- Shane Keister - Moog synthesizer, acoustic piano
- Farrell Morris - percussion
- Lea Jane Berinati, Ginger Holloday, Lisa Silver, Jesse Taylor, Lloyd Maines, Gregg Wright - backing vocals
- Butch Hancock – background vocals on "West Texas Waltz"

=== Production ===
- Produced by Chip Young
- Recorded/remixed: Youngun' Sounds Studios, Murfreesboro, Tennessee
  - Engineer – Chip Young
- Mastering Studio: MCA Recording Studios, Universal City, California
  - Mastering Engineer – Larry Boden
- Digitally re-mastered at Masterfonics using the JVC Digital Audio Mastering System
  - Engineer – Glenn Meadows

=== Artwork ===
- Cover photo – Paul Milosevich

== Releases ==
In 2000, a remastered edition of Ely's first two albums (Joe Ely and Honky Tonk Masquerade) were released together on a single disk. Dirty Linen reported that this disk was especially worth seeking out since it was (at least at the time), "the only place on two continents you can get Ely's debut". The reviewer described Ely's first two albums together: "Ely's self-titled effort and HTM are a bit leaner than most of his other honky-tonk rockers, with a bit more piano than electric guitar backing his lonesome warble – dry and forceful as the wind whistling through Waco."

year	format	record company	catalog number
1978	LP	MCA	2333
		MCA	20378
	CD	MCA	MCAD-10220
	Cassette	MCA	MCAC-10220
1995	Cassette	Universal Special Products	20378
2000	CD	Beat Goes On (BGO)	BGOCD502
