= Across the Borderline =

Studio album by Willie Nelson
- Released: March 23, 1993
- Recorded: August–December 1992
- Genre: Country, country rock
- Label: Columbia
- Producer: Don Was, Paul Simon, Roy Halee

Willie Nelson chronology
The IRS Tapes: Who'll Buy My Memories? (1992)	Across the Borderline (1993)	Moonlight Becomes You (1994)

Professional ratings
Review scores
Source	Rating
AllMusic	4/5 stars
Calgary Herald	A
Robert Christgau	3/3 stars
Entertainment Weekly	A
Music Week	5/5 stars
The Observer	(favorable)
Select	3/5 medals

Across the Borderline is the 40th studio album by Willie Nelson. It was produced by Don Was, Paul Simon, and Roy Halee. It includes songs written by Paul Simon, Ry Cooder, John Hiatt, Peter Gabriel, Bob Dylan, Lyle Lovett, and Nelson himself. Featured performers include David Crosby, Kris Kristofferson, Sinéad O'Connor, Bonnie Raitt, Bob Dylan, and Paul Simon.

The title track, "Across the Borderline", was written by Ry Cooder, John Hiatt, and Jim Dickinson. It is a remake of a song by Freddy Fender, which was featured on the motion picture soundtrack for The Border starring Jack Nicholson.

"Don't Give Up" was performed by Nelson with Sinéad O'Connor singing the part sung by Kate Bush on the original Peter Gabriel recording.

Bonnie Raitt duets with Nelson on "Getting Over You".

Nelson and Bob Dylan wrote and performed a new composition, "Heartland", for this album.

Paul Simon duets with Nelson on his composition "American Tune".

== Track listing ==
All tracks are written by Willie Nelson, except where noted.

No.	Title	Writer(s)	Length
1.	"American Tune" (duet with Paul Simon)	Paul Simon	4:20
2.	"Getting Over You" (duet with Bonnie Raitt)	Stephen Bruton	4:03
3.	"(The) Most Unoriginal Sin"	John Hiatt	4:48
4.	"Don't Give Up" (duet with Sinéad O'Connor)	Peter Gabriel	6:58
5.	"Heartland" (duet with Bob Dylan)	Bob Dylan, Willie Nelson	4:32
6.	"Across the Borderline"	Jim Dickinson, John Hiatt, Ry Cooder	4:40
7.	"Graceland"	Paul Simon	4:44
8.	"Farther Down the Line"	Lyle Lovett	3:14
9.	"Valentine"		3:36
10.	"What Was It You Wanted"	Bob Dylan	5:24
11.	"I Love the Life I Live"	Willie Dixon	3:09
12.	"If I Were the Man You Wanted"	Lyle Lovett	3:37
13.	"She's Not for You"		3:15
14.	"Still Is Still Moving to Me"		3:30
Total length:			59:59

== Personnel ==
- Mose Allison – piano
- Mingo Araujo – congas
- Eric Bazilian – mandolin
- Jimmy Bralower – drums
- David Campbell – harmonium
- Gene Chrisman – drums
- David Crosby – backing vocals
- Paulinho Da Costa – percussion
- Debra Dobkin – percussion
- Bob Dylan – vocals
- Paul English – drums
- Paul Franklin – pedal steel guitar
- Johnny Gimble – violin
- Mark Goldenberg – guitar
- Milt Hinton – bass guitar
- James "Hutch" Hutchinson – bass guitar
- Mark Isham – trumpet
- Jim Keltner – drums
- Kris Kristofferson – vocals
- Mike Leech – bass guitar
- John Leventhal – guitar
- Grady Martin – guitar
- Bobbie Nelson – piano
- Mark O'Connor – violin
- Sinéad O'Connor – vocals
- Jody Payne – acoustic guitar
- Ray Phiri – guitar
- Bonnie Raitt – vocals, slide guitar
- Mickey Raphael – harmonica
- John Selelowane – guitar
- Paul Simon – guitar
- Smitty Smith – drums
- Bee Spears – bass guitar
- Fred Tackett – guitar
- Benmont Tench – organ
- Danny Timms – guitar, piano, organ, backing vocals
- Robby Turner – pedal steel guitar, mandolin
- Don Was – bass guitar
- Reggie Young – guitar
- Willie Nelson – vocals, acoustic guitar

== Certifications ==
Region	Certification	Certified units/sales
Norway (IFPI Norway)	Gold	25,000^{*}
^{*} Sales figures based on certification alone.
