= Passing Through (Owen Temple album) =

Studio album by Owen Temple
- Released: October 13, 1999
- Recorded: Austin, Texas, Feb-Mar 1999
- Genre: Country
- Length: 40:35
- Label: El Paisano
- Producer: Lloyd Maines

Owen Temple chronology
General Store (1997)	Passing Through (1999)	Right Here and Now (2002)

Professional ratings
Review scores
Source	Rating
Austin Chronicle	3.5/5 stars
Allmusic	(?)

Passing Through is the second album by American singer/songwriter Owen Temple. It was released in 1999 on El Paisano Records.

== Track listing ==
All songs (Temple) except where noted

1. “Downtown” - 3:43
2. “Driving Myself Crazy” (Temple, Paul Lee) - 3:18
3. “Can't Keep My Mind Off You” - 3:07
4. “Treat You Like I Do” - 4:21
5. “Lights of Town” - 4:08
6. “Open Window” - 2:25
7. “Listening to the A.M.” - 3:17
8. “House of Cards” - 3:24
9. “One Less Thing to Worry About” - 2:41
10. “Long Gone Daddy” (Hank Williams)- 3:08
11. “Passing Through” - 4:02
12. “I Wrote You a Waltz” - 2:41

== Credits ==
=== Musicians ===
- Owen Temple - Acoustic
- Lloyd Maines - Electric guitar, Acoustic, Pedal steel, Mandolin, Dobro, Harmony vocals on "Can't Keep My Mind Off You" and "Passing Through"
- Michael Tarabay - Bass
- Darcie Deaville - Fiddle
- Bukka Allen - Accordion, Piano
- Mark Patterson - drums
- Zack Taylor - drums
- Fred Remmert - percussion
- Terri Hendrix - Harmony vocals on "Can't Keep My Mind Off You," "Open Window," "House of Cards," and "Passing Through"
- Ryan Lynch - Harmony vocals on "Downtown," "Driving Myself Crazy," "Treat You Like I Do," "Lights of Town," "Listening to the A.M.," "One Less Thing to Worry About," "Long Gone Daddy," and "Like We Still Care"

=== Production ===
- Produced by Lloyd Maines
- Engineered by Fred Remmert
- Recorded at Cedar Creek Studios, Austin, Texas

=== Artwork ===
- Art Direction/Design by Russ C. Smith
- Photography by Stephen L. Clark and Owen Temple

== Releases ==
year	format	label	catalog #
1999	CD	El Paisano Records	EPR CD 650176
