= Candyland (James McMurtry album) =

Studio album by James McMurtry
- Released: 1992
- Label: Columbia
- Producer: Michael Wanchic

James McMurtry chronology
Too Long in the Wasteland (1989)	Candyland (1992)	Where'd You Hide the Body (1995)

Candyland is the second album by the American musician James McMurtry, released in 1992. McMurtry supported the album by participating in the "In Their Own Words: A Bunch of Songwriters Sittin' Around Singing" tour, with Marshall Crenshaw, Don Dixon, Jules Shear, and David Halley.

== Production ==
Produced by Michael Wanchic, the album was recorded in 1990. John Mellencamp coproduced one song, and most of his band played on the album. David Grissom played lead guitar. Candyland's release date was pushed back numerous times, due to Columbia Records' doubts about the songs, problems with McMurtry's management company, and Columbia's request that McMurtry record new material. McMurtry wrote all of the songs, mostly in the studio. He did not like to write about his personal life and also found it more difficult to write about pleasant subjects. The title track is about suburbia; McMurtry wrote it because his band thought he needed a song with a faster tempo. "Where's Johnny" is about a faded high school big man on campus. "Safe Side" describes segregated American neighborhoods. In "Hands Like Rain", an old man remembers how a woman helped him get through a rough period in his life.

== Critical reception ==
Professional ratings
Review scores
Source	Rating
AllMusic	3/5 stars
Calgary Herald	B+
Chicago Tribune	3/4 stars
The Indianapolis Star	3/4 stars
MusicHound Rock: The Essential Album Guide	3/5 stars

Trouser Press opined that "the songs stand out more as hummable tunes," writing that "it's a compelling assortment of small-town tragedies of lost love, lost youth and lost ideals that exposes unpleasant aspects of an America most people would prefer to deny." The New York Times determined that McMurtry's "characters are detached, stranded without frontiers to strive toward; their lives are cluttered with things they're not sure they need." The Boston Globe stated: "His trump card is resignation, and the Americans he profiles can be characterized as closed-minded. Their world, spiritually and financially mediocre, is unchanging."

The Indianapolis Star noted that "cynics might justly accuse McMurtry of merely painting by numbers in this 10-song follow-up." The Kitchener-Waterloo Record panned "McMurtry's almost directionless voice and often somnolent writing." Rolling Stone concluded that, "with his dusty voice and limited range, McMurtry needs to vary his laconic delivery to ensure that his singing doesn't fade to gray after a half-dozen songs."

AllMusic wrote that "McMurtry offers a deep, personable (if plain) voice and delivery, equally suited to both country and rock."

== Track listing ==
No.	Title	Length
1.	"Where's Johnny"
2.	"Vague Directions"
3.	"Hands Like Rain"
4.	"Safe Side"
5.	"Candyland"
6.	"Don't Waste Away"
7.	"Good Life"
8.	"Save Yourself"
9.	"Storekeeper"
10.	"Dusty Pages"
