= Augusta (album) =

1995 album by Willie Nelson

Studio album by Willie Nelson and Don Cherry
- Released: 1995
- Genre: Country
- Label: Sundown
- Producer: Charlie Shaffer

Willie Nelson and Don Cherry chronology
Just One Love (1995)	Augusta (1995)	Willie Standard Time (1996)

Professional ratings
Review scores
Source	Rating
The Encyclopedia of Popular Music	2/5 stars

Augusta is an album by the country singer Willie Nelson and the big band singer Don Cherry. It was released in 1995 on Sundown Records. The title track is about the Masters Tournament.

== Track listing ==
1. "My Way" - 4:18
2. "Augusta" - 2:46
3. "One for My Baby (And One More for the Road)" - 4:09
4. "Red Sails in the Sunset" - 2:53
5. "Try a Little Tenderness" - 4:21
6. "Tangerine" - 3:08
7. "I Love You for Sentimental Reasons" - 2:55
8. "Prisoner of Love" - 2:50
9. "Tenderly" - 3:34
10. "Maybe You'll Be There" - 4:15
11. "Don't Go to Strangers" - 3:23
12. "Night Life" - 2:35
13. "Rainy Day Blues" - 3:05

== Personnel ==
- Willie Nelson - Guitar, vocals
- Jay Orlando - Saxophone, soloist
- Charlie Shaffer - Piano, arranger
