= Willie Standard Time =

Compilation album by Willie Nelson
- Released: 1996
- Genre: Country
- Length: 28:27
- Label: Sony

Willie Nelson chronology
Augusta (1995)	Willie Standard Time (1996)	Spirit (1996)

Professional ratings
Review scores
Source	Rating
AllMusic	2.5/5 stars

Willie Standard Time is a 1996 album by country singer Willie Nelson. The album is composed of ten tracks, all covers of popular songs such as "Wind Beneath My Wings" and "Stormy Weather". Per the AllMusic review, the album was a perfect Willie Nelson sampler for budget-centered fans of the time.

== Track listing ==
1. "Stormy Weather" (Harold Arlen, Ted Koehler) – 2:23
2. "Don't Get Around Much Anymore" (Duke Ellington, Bob Russell) – 2:32
3. "Ole Buttermilk Sky" (Hoagy Carmichael) – 2:49
4. "Wind Beneath My Wings" (Larry Henley, Sibar) – 3:48
5. "I'm Gonna Sit Right Down (And Write Myself a Letter)" (Fred E. Ahlert, Joe Young) – 2:57
6. "Am I Blue" (Harry Akst, Grant Clarke) – 2:17
7. "Unchained Melody" (Alex North, Hy Zaret) – 3:48
8. "Exactly Like You" (Jimmy McHugh, Dorothy Fields) – 2:24
9. "Old Fashioned Love" (Cecil Mack, James P. Johnson) – 2:50
10. "That Lucky Old Sun (Just Rolls Around Heaven All Day)" (Smith, Haven Gillespie) – 2:39

== Personnel ==
- Willie Nelson – guitar, vocals
