= General Store (album) =

Studio album by Owen Temple
- Released: December 10, 1997
- Recorded: Austin, Texas, June 1997
- Genre: Country
- Length: 37:55
- Label: El Paisano
- Producer: Lloyd Maines

Owen Temple chronology
General Store (1997)	Passing Through (1999)

Professional ratings
Review scores
Source	Rating
Austin Chronicle	link

General Store is the debut album by American singer/songwriter Owen Temple. It was released in 1997 on El Paisano Records.

== Track listing ==
All songs (Temple) except where noted

1. “When I Hit San Antone” - 3:59
2. “Me and Maria” - 3:43
3. “Tennessee Highway” (Temple, Lendon Lewis) - 3:58
4. “Dry Creek” - 3:16
5. “Jaded Lover” (Chuck Pyle) - 3:47
6. “The Wanna Wanna Bar” - 4:31
7. “Mary” - 3:57
8. “You Never Can Tell” - 3:00
9. “James' Blues” - 3:28
10. “If You Called” - 3:45

== Credits ==
=== Musicians ===
- Owen Temple - Acoustic
- Lloyd Maines - Electric guitar, Acoustic, Pedal steel, Mandolin, and Dobro
- John Inmon - Electric guitar, Acoustic
- Michael Tarabay - Bass
- Richard Bowden - Fiddle, Mandolin
- Rich Brotherton - Mandolin
- Riley Osbourn - keyboards
- Bob Livingston - Harmonica
- Stan Smith - Clarinet
- John Treanor - Washboard
- Bukka Allen - Accordion
- Mark Patterson - drums
- Fred Remmert - percussion
- Cory Morrow - Vocals on "Jaded Lover"
- Pat Green - Vocals on "Jaded Lover"
- Paul Lee - Harmony vocals on "When I Hit San Antone", "Tennessee Highway", "Mary", "The Wanna Wanna Bar", "Jaded Lover", and "You Never Can Tell"
- Terri Hendrix - Harmony vocals on "If You Called"
- Graham Sones - Harmony vocals on "Me and Maria" and "James' Blues"

=== Production ===
- Produced by Lloyd Maines
- Engineered by Fred Remmert
- Recorded at Cedar Creek Studios, Austin, Texas

=== Artwork ===
- Art Direction/Design by Jennifer Jones
- Photography by Stephen L. Clark

== Releases ==
year	format	label	catalog #
1997	CD	El Paisano Records	EPR CD 650175

== Cover art ==
The cover art depicts Temple standing in front of the Fischer Store, a structure located in Fischer, Texas that dates back to 1902.
