= David Grissom =

American guitarist

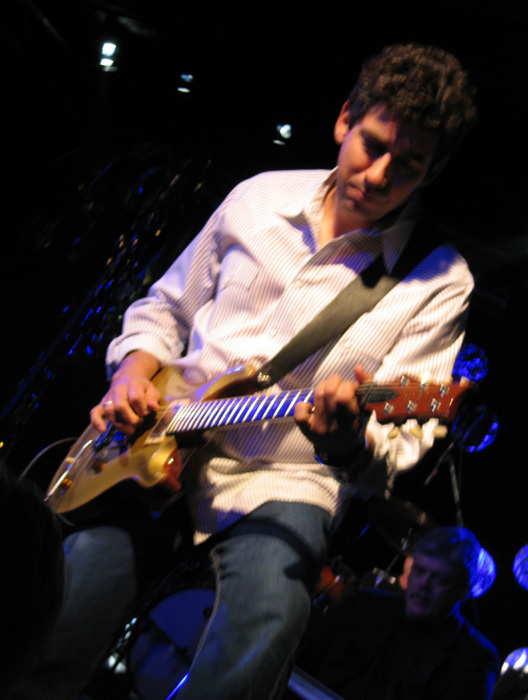
- Grissom in concert, December 31, 2005 Photo: Andrew Minnick

Background information
- Genres: Rock and roll, Country rock, Blues rock
- Occupations: Musician, songwriter
- Instruments: Guitar, vocals
- Label: Sony/BMG
- Website: Official site

David Grissom is an American guitarist who has played and toured with several of America's leading bands and recording artists. He is best known for his work with Joe Ely and John Mellencamp. He has released four solo albums: Loud Music, 10,000 Feet, Way Down Deep, and How It Feels to Fly. Grissom uses a PRS guitar and has for most of his career.

== Career ==
While still recording with Joe Ely, Grissom joined the John Mellencamp Band. Following Mellencamp, he played briefly with Will and the Kill, then went on to form the critically acclaimed Storyville with Malford Milligan (vocals), David Lee Holt (guitar), Tommy Shannon (bass) and Chris Layton (drums). Grissom has since toured with the Allman Brothers and the Dixie Chicks. On May 19, 2007, at a free concert titled "The Road To Austin", Bobby Whitlock performed his electric arrangements of "Layla" and "Why Does Love Got To Be So Sad" with dueling guitars courtesy of David Grissom and Eric Johnson. Grissom released his first solo album Loud Music in 2007. He has also recorded sessions, played and toured with a number of other American recording artists, including Buddy Guy, Chris Isaak, Sarah Hickman and Bob Dylan. David Grissom was featured on Owen Temple's 2008 album Two Thousand Miles. In 2009 Grissom released his second solo album 10,000 Feet, which featured 11 new songs plus an acoustic version of "Good Day For The Blues," which was originally recorded by Storyville.

== Guitars ==
Grissom has played PRS (Paul Reed Smith) guitars for most of his professional career. He played a modified PRS McCarty Trem for over a decade. In 2007, after a 25-year relationship working with Paul on the design and improvement of PRS guitars from a touring/session player's perspective, his collaboration with Paul Reed Smith resulted in the DGT (David Grissom Trem) signature model. Its innovations include special pickups developed by Grissom, Dunlop 6100-like fretwire, a nitrocellulose finish, coil taps for both pickups, and two volume knobs to allow the blending of both humbucking pickups. Grissom has noted that this feature was inspired by the sounds Jimmy Page created on the early Led Zeppelin albums.

== How It Feels to Fly (2014) ==
The fourth solo release included eight new studio tracks and four extended live tracks, with covers of the Allman Brother's "Jessica" and ZZ Top's "Nasty Dogs And Funky Kings".

== Discography ==
- 2000: Texas Boy (Sky Malone With Double Trouble, David Grissom and Riley Osbourne)
- 2007: Loud Music (Wide Lode Records)
- 2009: 10,000 Feet (Wide Lode Records)
- 2011: Way Down Deep (Wide Lode Records)
- 2014: How It Feels To Fly (Wide Lode Records)
- 2020: Trio (Live) 2020 (Wide Lode Records)

=== With Joe Ely ===
- 1987: Joe Ely Lord of the Highway
- 1988: Joe Ely Dig All Night
- 1990: Joe Ely Live at Liberty Lunch
- 1993: Joe Ely Love and Danger
- 2009: Joe Ely Live Chicago 1987
- 2024: Joe Ely Fighting the Rain
- 2025: Joe Ely Love and Freedom

=== With John Mellencamp ===
- 1991: John Mellencamp Whenever We Wanted
- 1993: John Mellencamp Human Wheels

=== Guest appearances ===
- 1988: Will and Kill, Will and the Kill
- 1989: James McMurtry Too Long in the Wasteland
- 1992: James McMurtry Candyland
- 1995: Toni Price Hey

== External links and sources ==
- Official website
- David Grissom on last.fm
- Review of Dave Grissom's CD Loud Music on Guitar Jam Daily
- Interview with David Grissom on Guitar Jam Daily
- David Grissom discography at Discogs
