= The Belle Sounds =

American musical band

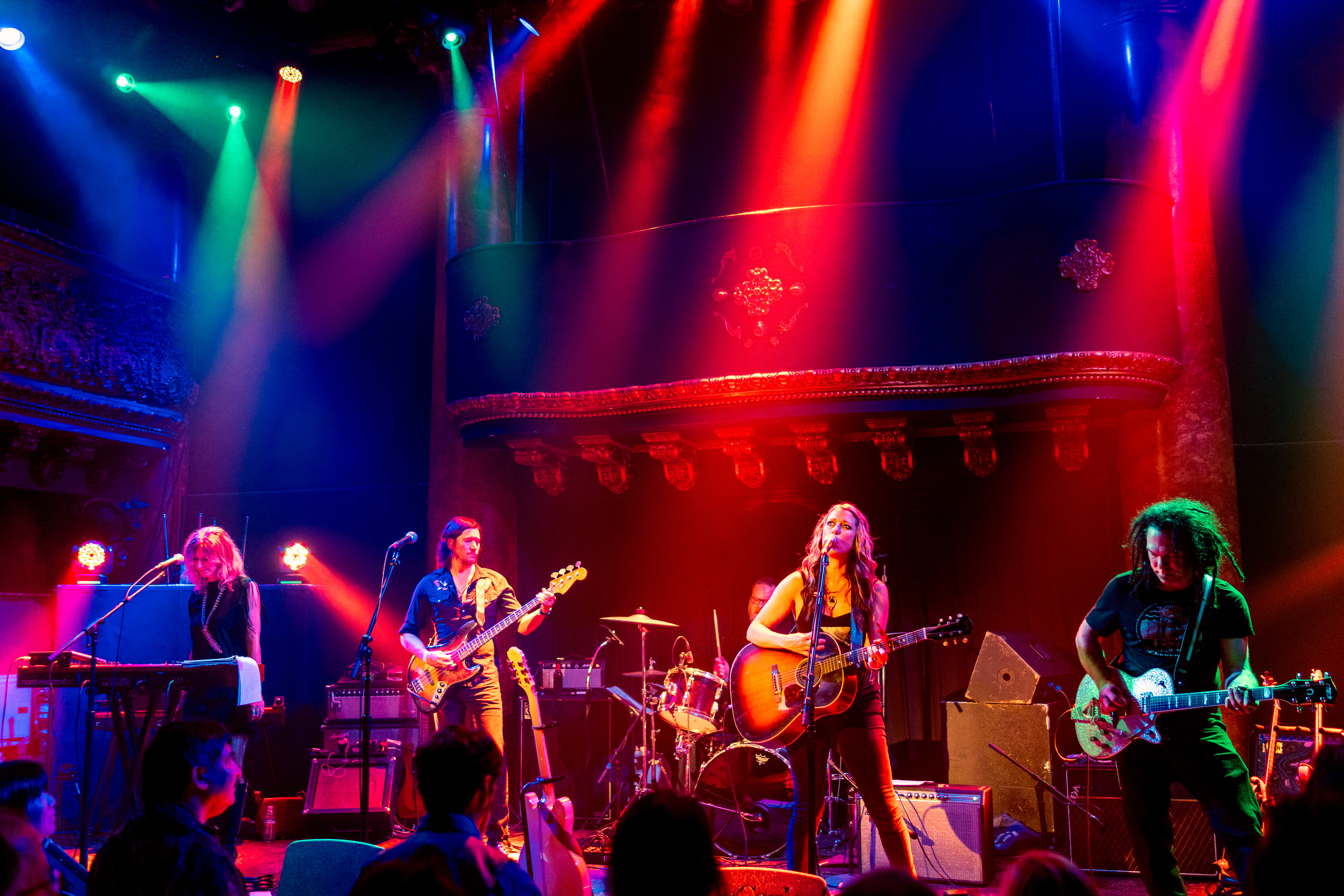
- The Belle Sounds at The Great American Music Hall in San Francisco 2016

Background information
- Origin: Austin, Texas, U.S.
- Genres: Indie; Pop; Rock
- Years active: 2012–present
- Members: Noëlle Hampton; André Moran (Guitar); Jim Echels (Drums, Vocals); Emily Shirley(Keyboard, Guitar, Vocals); Greg Hagen (Bass, Vocals)
- Past members: Harmoni Kelley (Bass, Vocals); Nathan Harlan (Bass, Vocals); Kris Nelson (Bass, Vocals)
- Website: thebellesounds.com

The Belle Sounds are an American indie-pop rock band from Austin, Texas. The band was formed by married couple Noëlle Hampton and André Moran in 2012. Hampton and Moran decided they wanted to experiment with indie-pop music, moving away from the Americana music they had been performing since 1998 as Noëlle Hampton. Hampton and Moran teamed up with Emily Shirley (keyboard, guitars, vocals), Harmoni Kelley (bass) and Lee Marciniak (drums), and began as a female-fronted group with Hampton, Shirley and Kelley as the main vocalists. Kelley left the group in 2014 to tour with national acts including Kenny Chesney. She was replaced by bass players Nathan Harlan and Kris Nelson. Greg Hagan is their current bass player and Jim Echels is their drummer; both also contribute vocals.

== Film, television and radio ==
"Bourbon on Your Lips", from the Belle Sound's first self-titled album, was featured in the sci-fi thriller Dark Skies, starring Keri Russell, in 2013.

The band next released the five-song EP Black Stone.

Their third album, The Sea Within, was released on July 20, 2018, and received local and national radio airplay and favorable reviews on KUTX 98.9, "The Austin Music Experience", Sun Radio 101.1, "The Bridge",KOOP (FM) and KGSR 93.3, "Lone Star State of Mind". The band was invited to perform live on KTBC (TV) Fox 7 Austin, "Music In The Morning", and CBS "Music Monday" in July, 2018.The Sea Within music video, "Like A Villain", has been the subject of features in Atwood Magazine, BroadwayWorld and Glide Magazine, among others.

The Belle Sounds have performed as the opening band with national acts such as Jerry Jeff Walker at Austin City Limits Live at the Moody Theater (known as ACL Live) in Austin.

== The Belle Sounds Day ==
Austin, Texas, mayor Steve Adler proclaimed April 13, 2017, as "The Belle Sounds Day", granting the band the right to celebrate their day annually.

== TEDx performance ==
Hampton performed as a special guest at the December 4, 2018 TEDx event, BartonSpringsWomen, which featured eighteen women giving talks on curated content from TED Women of 2018. They appeared before a sold-out audience at St. Edward's University in Austin, Texas. Hampton performed songs linking topics including racial diversity, women in leadership and the science and spirituality of birth.

== Discography ==
Year	Title	Label	Notes
2013	The Belle Sounds	Independent	Produced by Neilson Hubbard
2014	Black Stone	Independent	Produced by Neilson Hubbard
2018	The Sea Within	Independent	Produced by David Boyle
