= Just Us Kids =

Studio album by James McMurtry
- Released: April 15, 2008
- Recorded: 2008, Wire Recording, Austin, Texas, U.S.
- Genre: Country
- Length: 59:28
- Label: Lightning Rod
- Producer: James McMurtry

James McMurtry chronology
Childish Things (2005)	Just Us Kids (2008)	Live in Europe (2009)

Professional ratings
Aggregate scores
Source	Rating
Metacritic	82/100
Review scores
Source	Rating
AllMusic	4/5 stars
American Songwriter	3/5 stars
The Austin Chronicle	4/5 stars
Blender	3.5/5 stars
Entertainment Weekly	A−
Mojo	4/5 stars
MSN Music (Consumer Guide)	A−
PopMatters	8/10
Q	4/5 stars

Just Us Kids is an album by American singer-songwriter James McMurtry. It was nominated at the 2008 Americana Music Association for Album of the Year, Song of the Year ("Cheney's Toy") and earned McMurtry a nomination for Artist of the Year.

== Track listing ==
All songs written by James McMurtry unless otherwise noted.

1. "Bayou Tortous" – 4:52
2. "Just Us Kids" – 5:10
3. "God Bless America (Pat MacDonald Must Die)" – 5:03
4. "Cheney's Toy" – 5:51
5. "Freeway View" – 3:40
6. "Hurricane Party" – 5:58
7. "Ruby and Carlos" – 6:38
8. "Brief Intermission" (McMurtry, Daren Hess, Ronnie Johnson) – 2:53
9. "Fire Line Road" (McMurtry, Tim Holt) – 5:32
10. "The Governor" – 5:53
11. "Ruins of the Realm" – 4:27
12. "You'd A' Thought (Leonard Cohen Must Die)" – 5:17

== Personnel ==
- James McMurtry: lead vocal, guitars, mandoguitar, banjo, mandolin, dulcimer,
- Ronnie Johnson: 4 string and 8 string bass guitars, vocals,
- Daren Hess: drums, percussion, tympany, whistle
- Ian McLagan: organ, piano
- Harmoni Kelly: vocals
- Brian Standefer: cello
- Chris Maresh: bass viol
- Jon Dee Graham: lap steel
- Pat MacDonald: harmonicas, vocals,
- Ephraim Owens: trumpet
- Charlie Richards: guitar, lap steel
- Lee Scott: vocals
- John Nelson: percussion
- Curtis McMurtry: baritone saxophone
- C.C. Adcock: guitar
