= Right Here and Now (Owen Temple album) =

Studio album by Owen Temple
- Released: July 11, 2002
- Recorded: Nashville, Tennessee, December 2001
- Genre: Country
- Length: 43:44
- Label: El Paisano
- Producer: Phil Madeira

Owen Temple chronology
Passing Through (1999)	Right Here and Now (2002)	Two Thousand Miles (2008)

Professional ratings
Review scores
Source	Rating
Allmusic	(?)
Houston Press	(?)
Country Standard Time	(?)

Right Here and Now is the third album by American singer/songwriter Owen Temple. It was released in 2002 on El Paisano Records.

== Track listing ==
All songs (Temple) except where noted

1. “Accidentally Break My Heart” - 2:57
2. “Burning Too Hot to Last” - 2:58
3. “Little Sweet Loss” - 3:31
4. “This Ain't Las Vegas” - 3:48
5. “No Daring Is Fatal” - 3:24
6. “Move Around Money” - 3:36
7. “For Old Times' Sake” - 3:14
8. “Before the Night Becomes the Dawn” - 4:59
9. “Trouble With You” - 3:06
10. “The Madder You Are (The Cuter You Get) ” - 4:15
11. “Faith Without Works” - 2:49
12. “That's Not Something I Could Do” - 4:49

== Credits ==
=== Musicians ===
- Owen Temple - acoustic
- Phil Madeira - electric guitar, acoustic, pedal steel, Piano, Mandolin, Accordion, Dobro, harmony vocals on "Move Around Money"
- Mark Robertson - bass
- Al Perkins - pedal steel
- Fats Kaplin - Fiddle, Mandolin
- Dennis Holt - drums
- Jake Armerding - harmony vocals on "Accidentally Break My Heart," "No Daring Is Fatal," "Before The Night Becomes The Dawn," "Faith Without Works," and "That's Not Something I Could Do"
- Greg Trooper harmony vocals on "Trouble With You," "The Madder You Are (The Cuter You Get)," and "Like We Still Care"
- Kenny Meeks - harmony vocals on "Burning Too Hot to Last," "Little Sweet Loss," "This Ain't Las Vegas," "For Old Times' Sake," and "Rivers Run From Many Waters"

=== Production ===
- Produced by Phil Madeira
- Engineered by Jordan Richter and Phil Madeira
- Recorded at Roswell East, Nashville, Tennessee and at The Mission, Nashville, Tennessee

=== Artwork ===
- Art Direction/Design by Grafika
- Photography by Kim Maguire

== Releases ==
year	format	label	catalog #
2002	CD	El Paisano Records	EPR CD 650177
