= Moonlight Becomes You (album) =

Studio album by Willie Nelson
- Released: February 15, 1994
- Recorded: July–November 1993
- Genre: Country
- Length: 44:42
- Label: Justice
- Producer: Willie Nelson, Paul Buskirk, Randall Hage Jamail

Willie Nelson chronology
Across the Borderline (1993)	Moonlight Becomes You (1994)	Six Hours at Pedernales (1994)

Moonlight Becomes You is the 41st studio album by country singer Willie Nelson. The title track was nominated for a Grammy.

Professional ratings
Review scores
Source	Rating
AllMusic	3/5 stars
Robert Christgau	(3-star Honorable Mention)
NME	5/10

== Track listing ==
1. "December Day" (Willie Nelson) - 2:19
2. "Moonlight Becomes You" (Johnny Burke, Jimmy Van Heusen) - 3:51
3. "Afraid" (Fred Rose) - 2:35
4. "The Heart of a Clown" (Steve Nelson, Jack Rollins, Francis Kane) - 3:45
5. "Please Don't Talk About Me When I'm Gone" (Sidney Clare, Sam Stept) - 2:05
6. "Everywhere You Go" (Larry Shay, Mark Fisher, Joe Goodwin) - 3:35
7. "Have I Stayed Away Too Long" (Frank Loesser) - 4:07
8. "Sentimental Journey" (Bud Green, Les Brown, Ben Homer) - 3:14
9. "The World Is Waiting for the Sunrise" (Gene Lockhart, Ernest Seitz) - 2:20
10. "You'll Never Know" (Mack Gordon, Harry Warren) - 3:14
11. "I'll Keep On Loving You" (Floyd Tillman) - 2:49
12. "You Just Can't Play a Sad Song on a Banjo" (Paul Buskirk, Russell Jackson) - 2:03
13. "You Always Hurt the One You Love" (Doris Fisher, Allan Roberts) - 2:27
14. "Someday (You'll Want Me to Want You)" (Jimmie Hodges) - 3:29
15. "In God's Eyes" (Willie Nelson) - 2:58

== Personnel ==
- Willie Nelson - guitar, vocals
- Paul Buskirk - guitar, mandola
- Johnny Gimble - fiddle, vocals, harmony vocals
- Mike Lefebvre - drums
- Dean Reynolds - bass guitar
- Paul Schmitt - piano

== Chart performance ==
Chart (1994)	Peak position
Canadian RPM Country Albums	14
Australian Albums Chart	20
U.S. Billboard Top Country Albums	37
U.S. Billboard 200	188
