= Gabriel Rhodes =

Gabriel (Gabe) Rhodes (born in 1974 in Sunset, Texas) is an American folk and country music musician and producer based in Austin, Texas.

Perhaps best known as an electric and acoustic guitar player, Rhodes is a multi-instrumentalist who has also performed and/or recorded playing piano, dobro, bass, theremin, and percussion.

His contribution to Willie Nelson's The Rainbow Connection was noted in the review of the record by the Austin Chronicle: "Most Valuable Prodigy goes to fleet-fingered Gabe Rhodes, who continues to hit in the big leagues". A Dallas Observer review of Owen Temple's Dollars and Dimes, commented on "the moody, understated accompaniment from producer Gabriel Rhodes and backing players [that] fits the mood like an old pair of Levi's".

He has produced and recorded projects for Willie Nelson, Billy Joe Shaver, Kimmie Rhodes, Waylon Jennings, Ray Price, Emmylou Harris, James Burton, Jimmy LaFave, Owen Temple, Paula Nelson, Dick Rivers, Beth Nielsen Chapman, Kieran Goss, Folk Uke, and Calvin Russell, among others. He has contributed to more than 17 nationally distributed albums in the last ten years. He also contributed production duties to Beautiful Dreamer: The Songs of Stephen Foster, which won a Grammy for Best Traditional Folk Album in 2005.

His composing and arranging work for film includes composing the music for the PBS-aired documentary Writ Writer and co-producing music with Bob Ezrin for the feature film, Babe: Pig in the City.

In 2013, Rhodes collaborated with Paul Marsteller to produce The Beautiful Old, a collection of new recordings of turn-of-the-century songs, with songs performed by Richard Thompson, Garth Hudson, Graham Parker, Jimmy LaFave, Will Sexton, among others. The Daily Telegraph called it a "super musical history lesson" and the Austin Chronicle described it as a "musical time machine."

In 2020, Rhodes contributed guitar solo work along with Mark Knopfler, Peter Frampton, and Duane Eddy as part of an all-star charity recording of Ben E. King's classic song "Stand by Me" performed by "some of the finest musicians on earth, all contributing their parts from isolation in locations across the world."

Gabriel released a solo album project titled Selling Tumbleweeds on August 22, 2025.

== See also ==
- Music of Austin
