= Owen Temple =

American singer-songwriter

- Born: 1976 (age 49–50)
- Origin: Kerrville, Texas, U.S.
- Genres: Folk; country music
- Instruments: Vocals; guitar; harmonica
- Label: El Paisano
- Website: owentemple.com

Owen Temple (born September 4, 1976 in Kerrville, Texas) is an American folk and country music songwriter and musician based in Austin, Texas.

== Career ==
His work with producer and pedal steel guitar musician Lloyd Maines led to 1997's General Store and 1999's Passing Through. In 2002, Right Here and Now was released, produced by Phil Madeira. In 2007 and 2011, Temple was a Kerrville Folk Festival New Folk Finalist, and he won the 2007 B. W. Stevenson Songwriting Competition.

Two Thousand Miles, a fourth album, was produced by Maines and released on January 22, 2008 on El Paisano Records. A review in AllMusic said it has "great lyrics full of insight and plainspoken poetry." A fifth studio album, Dollars and Dimes, came out on June 9, 2009. It is a concept album focused on different regions of North America during hard times. In July 2009, the album was the No. 1 record on the Euro Americana Chart. In August 2009, the album was No. 5 on the Freeform American Roots chart.

Mountain Home, a sixth album, was released on April 26, 2011, and the songs on the album are about small Texas towns and the eccentrics inhabiting them. Stories They Tell, a seventh album, was released on September 24, 2013. An eighth studio album, Rings on a Tree, was released on September 29, 2023 and its songs, many with co-writers including Walt Wilkins and Hal Ketchum, comprise a concept album about intergenerational interactions.

In 2025, Temple released two additional projects: Weathered, an EP of new material, and Live in Austin, a live album recorded in Texas. Reviewing this period of his work, the Italian music blog Roots Highway characterized Temple as “one of the leading names on the Texas scene.”

A book on songwriting, co-authored with Gordy Quist, titled Songfarmer: Writing More and Better Songs was published on November 1, 2015. Dreamer: A Tribute to Kent Finlay, was released in early 2016 on Austin-based Eight 30 Records, features Temple's version of Finlay's "Mines of Terlingua."

== Artist discography ==
- General Store (1997)
- Passing Through (1999)
- Right Here and Now (2002)
- Two Thousand Miles (2008)
- Dollars and Dimes (2009)
- Mountain Home (2011)
- Stories They Tell (2013)
- Rings on a Tree (2023)
- Weathered (2025)
- Live in Austin (2025)

== Writer discography ==
Year	Artist	Album	Details
2001	Cory Morrow	Double Exposure (Live)	Co-writer (She Don't Know Where She's Going)
2010	Cory Morrow	Ramblin' Man	Co-writer (Ramblin' Man)
2011	Band of Heathens	Top Hat Crown and the Clapmaster's Son	Co-writer (Medicine Man, Gris Gris Satchel)
2011	Mark Jungers	More Like a Good Dog Than a Bad Cat	Co-writer (Can't Take It with You)
2012	The Trishas	High, Wide & Handsome	Co-writer (John Wayne Cowboy)
2014	Kelley Mickwee	You Used to Live Here	Co-writer (Beautiful Accidents)
2014	Adam Carroll	Let It Choose You	Co-writer (Good Behavior, Old Child Country Star)
2015	Jamie Lin Wilson	Holidays & Wedding Rings	Co-writer (Here Tonight)
2015	Walt Wilkins	A Good Ramble	Co-writer (Days)
2015	Cory Morrow	The Good Fight	Co-writer (Winning Hand, All I Need is You)
2015	Roger Creager	Gulf Coast Time	Writer (Wanna Wanna Bar)
2016	Thom Shepherd	Saltwater Cowboy	Co-writer (The 22 Long)
2016	Walt Wilkins	Streetlight	Co-writer (Crows, Ask Her to Dance, The Painter By the Lake, Watch It Shine)
2016	Walt Wilkins and The Mystiqueros	Watch It Shine	Co-writer (Watch It Shine)
2016	Paul Cauthen	My Gospel	Co-writer (Be There Soon, My Gospel)
2017	Band of Heathens	Duende	Co-writer (Trouble Came Early, Cracking the Code)
2017	Lola & The Huntsmen	Don't Get Lonely	Co-writer (Don't Get Lonely, Reno)
2018	Courtney Patton	What It's Like to Fly Alone	Writer (Gold Standard)
2021	Charlie and the Regrets	Walking Away	Writer (One Day Closer to Rain)
2021	Walt Wilkins	Pedernales	Co-writer (My Friends, Christmas Whiskey, One True Beautiful Thing)
2022	Clay McClinton	Age Like Wine	Co-writer (Amber and Bones, Homegrown, Cities Made of Gold, Country Girl, It's Like Love, Waste of Time)
2022	Kelley Mickwee	Single	Co-writer (Gold Standard)
2022	Drew Kennedy	Marathon	Writer (Watch It Shine)
2023	B.R. Lively	People	Co-writer (Phantom Pain)
2024	Gretchen Peters	If It Weren't for You	Co-writer (Watch It Shine)
2024	Kelley Mickwee	Everything Beautiful	Co-writer (Force of Nature)
2025	Walt Wilkins & The Ramble	Through the Stars	Co-writer (Walk This World)
2025	Walt Wilkins	Wild Seeds on the Wind	Co-writer (Wild Seeds on the Wind)
2025	John Baumann	Guy on a Rock	Co-writer (Guy on a Rock)
2025	The Rifters	Heroes and Friends	Co-writer (One True Beautiful Thing)

== See also ==
- Music of Austin
