= Joe Ely =

American singer-songwriter (1947–2025)

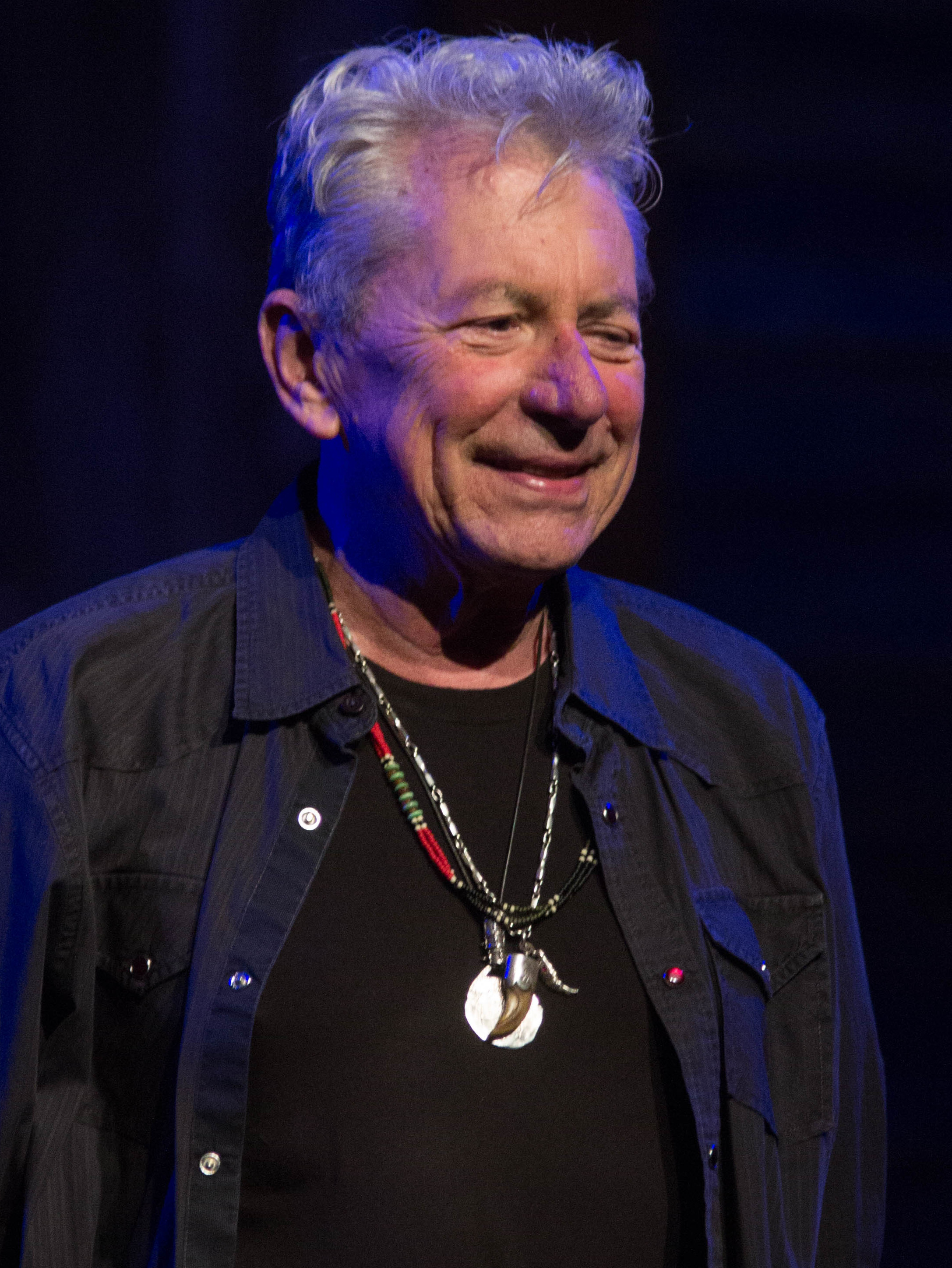
- Ely in 2017

Background information
- Born: February 9, 1947; Amarillo, Texas, U.S.
- Origin: Lubbock, Texas, U.S.
- Died: December 15, 2025 (aged 78) Taos, New Mexico, U.S.
- Genres: Alternative country; Americana; progressive country; roots rock
- Occupations: Singer-songwriter; musician
- Instruments: Vocals; guitar
- Years active: 1970–2025
- Labels: MCA; Hightone
- Website: ely.com

Joe Ely (/ˈiːli/; February 9, 1947 – December 15, 2025) was an American singer, songwriter and guitarist. He was "one of the main movers" of Austin, Texas's progressive country scene in the 1970s and 1980s.

Ely had a genre-crossing career, performing with Bruce Springsteen, Uncle Tupelo, Los Super Seven, The Chieftains, James McMurtry, The Clash, Lyle Lovett, John Hiatt, and Guy Clark.

== Life and career ==
=== Early life and band career ===
Born Earle Rewell Ely in Amarillo, Texas, in 1947, Ely spent his teenage years in Lubbock, Texas, and attended Monterey High School. His father Earl worked for the railways, and in Lubbock ran a used clothing store. He died when Ely was aged 13 and his wife was institutionalised. Ely went to live with relatives and contributed to finances by working as a dishwasher and cook in a cafe. He played violin from the age of eight and sang in the First Baptist Church choir. He sold his violin to buy an electric guitar and was expelled from Monterey High School for "singing 'Cherry Pie' by Marvin & Johnny in the middle of a school assembly". Ely "took to the road like his heroes Jack Kerouac and Woody Guthrie." He experienced "a drugs bust in Texas involving magic mushrooms", went to California where he bought a guitar, and in New York worked as a janitor in a theatre.

He returned to Lubbock and in 1971, with fellow Lubbock musicians Jimmie Dale Gilmore and Butch Hancock, formed The Flatlanders. He recalled, "We never had any money, but we never needed any." There was always "just enough for a bag of rice or a couple of potatoes". According to Ely, "Jimmie [Gilmore] was like a well of country music. He knew everything about it. And Butch was from the folk world. I was kinda the rock and roll guy and we almost had a triad. We hit it off and started playing a lot together. That opened up a whole new world I had never known existed."

In 1972, the band recorded their first album. The band's initial breakup occurred just after their first album was cut and the three musicians followed individual paths, but have appeared together on each other's albums. They reformed in 2002 for Now Again.

=== Solo career ===
Ely's first, self-titled album, was released in 1977. In 1978, his band played London, where he met British punk rock group the Clash. Impressed with each other's performances, the two bands later toured together, including appearances in Ely's hometown of Lubbock, as well as Laredo and Ciudad Juárez in Mexico, across the border from El Paso, Texas. The Clash paid tribute to Joe Ely by including the lyrics "Well, there ain't no better blend than Joe Ely and his Texas Men" in the lyrics of their song "If Music Could Talk", which was released in 1980 on the album Sandinista! Ely sang backing vocals on the Clash single "Should I Stay or Should I Go". Joe Strummer planned to record with Ely's band but died before that happened, which was one of Ely's greatest regrets.

On May 1, 1982, Ely presented the Third Annual Tornado Jam in Lubbock to a crowd of 25,000. The Jam included Linda Ronstadt, Leon Russell, Joan Jett, the Fabulous Thunderbirds, Jay Boy Adams and the Crickets. The first Tornado Jam was a fundraiser to help Lubbock after the Tornado, hence the name. The second Annual Tornado Jam drew a crowd of 35,000.

In the early 1980s, Ely toured with the Kinks, the Rolling Stones and Bruce Springsteen. In the 1990s, he collaborated with Dutch flamenco guitarist Teye, with whom he recorded Letter to Laredo (1995) and Twistin' in the Wind (1998). Throughout his career Ely issued a steady stream of albums, most on the MCA label, with a live album every 10 years or so.

In the late 1990s, Ely was asked to write songs for the soundtrack of Robert Redford's movie The Horse Whisperer, which led to his reforming the Flatlanders with Gilmore and Hancock. A new album from the trio followed in 2002, and a third in 2004.

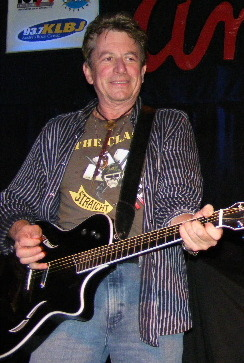
Ely in 2008

In February 2007, Ely released Happy Songs from Rattlesnake Gulch on his own label, Rack 'Em Records. Ely said in an interview with Country Standard Time that he thought it would be easier to release the material on his own label, instead of dealing with a regular record label and their release cycles. A book of Ely's writings, Bonfire of Roadmaps, was published in early 2007 by the University of Texas Press. In early 2008, Ely released a new live album featuring Joel Guzman on accordion, recorded at the Cactus Cafe in Austin, Texas, in late 2006.

The Flatlanders released their album Hills and Valleys on March 31, 2009. In 2011, Ely released the critically acclaimed album, Satisfied at Last. "Treasure of Love" by the Flatlanders was released in 2021 on Ely's Rack'em Records.

In September 2015, Ely released Panhandle Rambler, an album with a reflective West Texas feel. Lonestar Music magazine said, "the title fits the record just right, neatly framing a dozen songs that fit together thematically like a map of both the West Texas landscape and of Ely's epic decades-spanning musical ramble."

Ely spent 2016 as the reigning "Texas State Musician", a one-year designation that he formally accepted in a ceremony at the State Legislature that spring. In October 2022, he was inducted to the Austin City Limits Hall of Fame.

=== Illness and death ===
In September 2025, Ely announced he had been diagnosed with Parkinson's disease and Lewy body dementia. He died from Parkinson's, Lewy Body Dementia and pneumonia at his Taos, New Mexico home, on December 15, 2025, at the age of 78.

== Lawsuit against Universal Music Group ==
On February 5, 2019, Ely and John Waite filed a class-action lawsuit against Universal Music Group (UMG) claiming that the company was violating their right to terminate grants of copyright after 35 years, in accordance with copyright law of the United States, by ignoring notices of termination. On May 3, 2019, UMG filed a motion to dismiss the case, stating that the notices of termination were not valid because the songs were not grants of copyright, but works for hire.

== Discography ==
- Joe Ely (1977)
- Honky Tonk Masquerade (1978)
- Down on the Drag (1979)
- Musta Notta Gotta Lotta (1981)
- Hi-Res (1984)
- Lord of the Highway (1987)
- Dig All Night (1988)
- Live at Liberty Lunch (1990)
- Love and Danger (1992)
- Chippy (1994)
- Letter to Laredo (1995)
- Twistin' in the Wind (1998)
- Live at the Cambridge Folk Festival (1998)
- Streets of Sin (2003)
- Happy Songs from Rattlesnake Gulch (2007)
- Silver City (2007)
- Satisfied At Last (2011)
- B4 84 (2014)
- Panhandle Rambler (2015)
- Full Circle: The Lubbock Tapes (2018)
- Love in the Midst of Mayhem (2020)
- Love and Freedom (2025)

== Awards and nominations ==
Award	Date of ceremony	Category	Recipient(s)	Result	Ref.
Country Music Association Awards	September 30, 1992	Vocal Event of the Year	Buzzin' Cousins with James McMurtry, Dwight Yoakam, John Prine, and John Mellencamp	Nominated	
Grammy Awards	February 24, 1999	Best Mexican/Mexican-American Album	Los Super Seven with Los Super Seven	Won	

== See also ==
- The Flatlanders
- Los Super Seven
- Music of Austin

Awards
Preceded by Alejandro Escovedo	AMA Lifetime Achievement Award for Performing; 2007	Succeeded by Jason & the Scorchers
