= Willie Nelson albums discography =

Willie Nelson discography
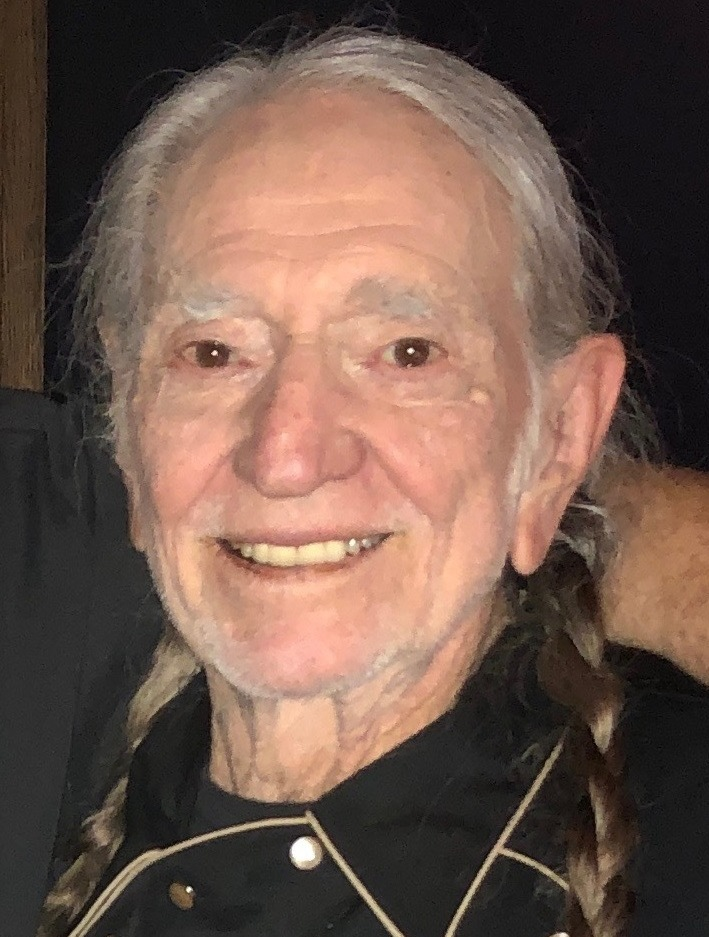
- Studio albums: 103
- Soundtrack albums: 2
- Live albums: 14
- Compilation albums: 51
- Video albums: 41

The following is a detailed discography of all albums released by country music singer Willie Nelson, since his professional debut in 1962. Nelson's discography includes 104 studio albums (consisting of 78 solo studio albums and 26 collaborative studio albums), 14 live albums, 51 compilation albums and 41 video albums as well as the soundtracks of The Electric Horseman and Honeysuckle Rose. According to Courier Journal, Nelson's 2024 album The Border was his 152nd album.

His albums have been successful in many countries, especially New Zealand, Australia and some European countries. Nelson has sold more than 40 million albums in the United States alone.

== Studio albums ==
=== 1960s ===
Title	Details	Peak positions
Title	Details	US Country
...And Then I Wrote	Release date: September 24, 1962; Label: Liberty Records	—
Here's Willie Nelson	Release date: July 1, 1963; Label: Liberty Records	—
Country Willie – His Own Songs	Release date: August 30, 1965; Label: RCA Victor	—
Country Favorites – Willie Nelson Style	Release date: April 18, 1966; Label: RCA Victor	9
Make Way for Willie Nelson	Release date: April 24, 1967; Label: RCA Victor	7
The Party's Over	Release date: September 18, 1967; Label: RCA Victor	9
Texas in My Soul	Release date: April 1, 1968; Label: RCA Victor	—
Good Times	Release date: October 14, 1968; Label: RCA Victor	29
My Own Peculiar Way	Release date: February 10, 1969; Label: RCA Records	39
"—" denotes releases that did not chart

=== 1970s ===
Title	Details	Peak chart positions						Certifications
Title	Details	US Country	US	AUS	CAN Country	CAN	NZ	Certifications
Both Sides Now	Release date: March 23, 1970; Label: RCA Victor	—	—	—	—	—	—	
Laying My Burdens Down	Release date: September 14, 1970; Label: RCA Victor	—	—	—	—	—	—	
Willie Nelson and Family	Release date: March 1, 1971; Label: RCA Victor	43	—	—	—	—	—	
Yesterday's Wine	Release date: November 15, 1971; Label: RCA Victor	43	—	—	—	—	—	
The Words Don't Fit the Picture	Release date: February 7, 1972; Label: RCA Victor	—	—	—	—	—	—	
The Willie Way	Release date: July 17, 1972; Label: RCA Victor	34	—	—	—	—	—	
Shotgun Willie	Release date: June 11, 1973; Label: Atlantic	41	205	—	—	—	—	
Phases and Stages	Release date: February 25, 1974; Label: Atlantic	34	187	—	—	—	—	
Red Headed Stranger	Release date: May 26, 1975; Label: Columbia	1	28	88	7	90	—	US: 2× Platinum; CAN: Gold
The Sound in Your Mind	Release date: March 1, 1976; Label: Columbia	1	48	—	—	—	—	US: Platinum
The Troublemaker	Release date: September 20, 1976; Label: Columbia	1	60	—	—	—	—	US: Gold
To Lefty from Willie	Release date: June 13, 1977; Label: Columbia	2	91	—	—	—	—	
Waylon & Willie (with Waylon Jennings)	Release date: January 9, 1978; Label: RCA Victor	1	12	—	7	11	—	US: 2× Platinum; CAN: Platinum
Stardust	Release date: April 17, 1978; Label: Columbia	1	30	5	1	28	1	US: 5× Platinum; AUS: Platinum; NZ: 4× Platinum; CAN: 2× Platinum
One for the Road (with Leon Russell)	Release date: June 11, 1979; Label: Columbia	3	25	85	1	28	11	US: Gold; CAN: Gold; NZ: Gold
Willie Nelson Sings Kristofferson	Release date: October 22, 1979; Label: Columbia	5	42		1	64	—	US: Platinum; CAN: Gold
Pretty Paper	Release date: November 5, 1979; Label: Columbia	11	73	99	—	—	—	US: Platinum; CAN: Gold
"—" denotes releases that did not chart

=== 1980s ===
Title	Details	Peak chart positions					Certifications
Title	Details	US Country	US	AUS	CAN Country	CAN	Certifications
San Antonio Rose (with Ray Price)	Release date: May 19, 1980; Label: Columbia	3	70	—	1	—	US: Gold
Family Bible	Release date: September 1, 1980; Label: Songbird	26	—	—	—	—	
Somewhere Over the Rainbow	Release date: February 23, 1981; Label: Columbia	1	31	30	—	23	US: Platinum; AUS: Gold
Always on My Mind	Release date: March 1, 1982; Label: Columbia	1	2	60	—	20	US: 4× Platinum; CAN: 2× Platinum
Old Friends (with Roger Miller)	Release date: May 17, 1982; Label: Columbia	—	—	—	—	—	
In the Jailhouse Now (with Webb Pierce)	Release date: June 28, 1982; Label: Columbia	—	—	—	—	—	
WWII (with Waylon Jennings)	Release date: September 27, 1982; Label: RCA	3	57	92	—	—	US: Gold
Pancho & Lefty (with Merle Haggard)	Release date: January 10, 1983; Label: Epic	1	37	—	—	—	US: Platinum; CAN: Gold
Tougher Than Leather	Release date: February 14, 1983; Label: Columbia	4	39	—	—	48	
Take It to the Limit (with Waylon Jennings)	Release date: April 18, 1983; Label: Columbia	3	60	—	—	—	US: Gold
Without a Song	Release date: October 24, 1983; Label: Columbia	3	54	85	2	35	US: Platinum; CAN: Gold
Angel Eyes	Release date: May 7, 1984; Label: Columbia	—	116	—	—	—	
City of New Orleans	Release date: July 1984; Label: Columbia	1	69	—	24	62	US: Platinum; CAN: Gold
Music from Songwriter (with Kris Kristofferson)	Release date: October 8, 1984; Label: Columbia	21	152	—	—	—	
Me and Paul	Release date: February 25, 1985; Label: Columbia	3	152	—	—	—	
Funny How Time Slips Away (with Faron Young)	Release date: April 22, 1985; Label: Columbia	—	—	—	—	—	
Brand on My Heart (with Hank Snow)	Release date: April 22, 1985; Label: Columbia	—	—	—	—	—	
The Promiseland	Release date: March 10, 1986; Label: Columbia	1	—	—	—	—	
Partners	Release date: October 6, 1986; Label: Columbia	13	—	—	—	—	
Island in the Sea	Release date: June 29, 1987; Label: Columbia	14	—	—	—	—	
Seashores of Old Mexico (with Merle Haggard)	Release date: October 13, 1987; Label: Epic	31	—	—	—	—	
What a Wonderful World	Release date: September 20, 1988; Label: Columbia	6	—	70	—	—	NZ: Gold
A Horse Called Music	Release date: July 31, 1989; Label: Columbia	2	—	132	—	—	
"—" denotes releases that did not chart

=== 1990s ===
Title	Details	Peak chart positions						Certifications
Title	Details	US Country	US	AUS	CAN Country	NOR	SWE	Certifications
Born for Trouble	Release date: September 24, 1990; Label: Columbia	31	—	180	—	—	—	
The IRS Tapes: Who'll Buy My Memories?	Release date: June 10, 1991; Label: Sony	—	—	—	—	—	—	
Clean Shirt (with Waylon Jennings)	Release date: July 2, 1991; Label: Epic	29	193	—	—	—	—	
Across the Borderline	Release date: March 23, 1993; Label: Columbia	15	75	53	5	4	—	NOR: Gold
Moonlight Becomes You	Release date: February 15, 1994; Label: Justice	37	188	20	14	—	—	
Six Hours at Pedernales (with Curtis Potter)	Release date: August 2, 1994; Label: Step One	—	—	118	—	—	—	
Healing Hands of Time	Release date: November 1, 1994; Label: Capitol	17	103	109	15	—	—	
Just One Love	Release date: July 4, 1995; Label: Transatlantic	—	—	173	—	—	—	
Augusta (with Don Cherry)	Release date: December 12, 1995; Label: Sundown	—	—	—	—	—	—	
Spirit	Release date: June 4, 1996; Label: Island	20	132	136	4	17	—	
How Great Thou Art (with Bobbie Nelson)	Release date: July 9, 1996; Label: Finer Arts	—	—	—	—	—	—	
Hill Country Christmas (with Bobbie Nelson)	Release date: October 14, 1997; Label: Finer Arts	60	—	—	—	—	—	
Teatro	Release date: September 1, 1998; Label: Island	17	104	127	15	—	58	
Night and Day	Release date: July 13, 1999; Label: Free Falls Entertainment	—	—	—	—	—	—	
"—" denotes releases that did not chart

=== 2000s ===
Title	Details	Peak chart positions					
Title	Details	US Country	US	AUS	NOR	SWE	NZ
Me and the Drummer	Release date: June 6, 2000; Label: Luck	—	—	—	—	—	—
Milk Cow Blues^{[A]}	Release date: September 19, 2000; Label: Island	—	83	178	—	—	—
Rainbow Connection	Release date: June 12, 2001; Label: Island	52	—	—	—	—	—
The Great Divide	Release date: January 15, 2002; Label: Lost Highway	5	43	109	23	—	—
The Eyes of Texas (with Don Cherry)	Release date: June 10, 2002; Label: Wildflower	—	—	—	—	—	—
Run That by Me One More Time (with Ray Price)	Release date: July 1, 2003; Label: Lost Highway	62	—	—	—	—	—
Nacogdoches	Release date: April 29, 2004; Label: Texas Roadhouse	—	—	—	—	—	—
It Always Will Be	Release date: October 26, 2004; Label: Lost Highway	12	75	—	—	—	—
Countryman	Release date: August 2, 2005; Label: Lost Highway	6	46	—	—	—	—
You Don't Know Me: The Songs of Cindy Walker	Release date: March 14, 2006; Label: Lost Highway	24	114	—	—	—	—
Songbird	Release date: October 31, 2006; Label: Lost Highway	19	87	—	34	46	—
Last of the Breed (with Merle Haggard and Ray Price)	Release date: March 20, 2007; Label: Lost Highway	7	64	—	—	—	—
It's Magic (with Don Cherry)	Release date: October 9, 2007; Label: Diamonddisc	—	—	—	—	—	—
Moment of Forever	Release date: January 29, 2008; Label: Lost Highway	8	56	—	—	—	—
Willie and the Wheel (with Asleep at the Wheel)	Release date: February 3, 2009; Label: Bismeaux	13	90	—	—	—	—
American Classic^{[B]}	Release date: August 25, 2009; Label: Blue Note	14	43	52	—	16	—
"—" denotes releases that did not chart

=== 2010s ===
Title	Details	Peak chart positions					
Title	Details	US Country	US	AUS	CAN	DEN	SWE
Country Music	Release date: April 20, 2010; Label: Rounder	4	20	—	—	—	41
Remember Me, Vol. 1	Release date: November 22, 2011; Label: R&J	40	—	—	—	—	—
Heroes	Release date: May 15, 2012; Label: Legacy Recordings	4	18	79	—	26	51
Let's Face the Music and Dance	Release date: April 16, 2013; Label: Legacy Recordings	16	49	—	—	—	—
To All the Girls...	Release date: October 15, 2013; Label: Legacy Recordings	2	9	129	21	—	—
Band of Brothers	Release date: June 17, 2014; Label: Legacy Recordings	1	5	66	—	—	—
December Day: Willie's Stash, Vol. 1 (with Bobbie Nelson)	Release date: December 2, 2014; Label: Legacy Recordings	26	—	—	—	—	—
Django & Jimmie (with Merle Haggard)	Release date: June 2, 2015; Label: Legacy Recordings	1	7	16	—	—	—
Summertime: Willie Nelson Sings Gershwin	Release date: February 26, 2016; Label: Legacy Recordings	—	40	82	—	—	—
For the Good Times: A Tribute to Ray Price	Release date: September 19, 2016; Label: Legacy Recordings	5	84	128	—	—	—
God's Problem Child	Release date: April 28, 2017; Label: Legacy Recordings	1	10	38	30	—	—
Willie and the Boys: Willie's Stash, Vol. 2 (with Lukas Nelson and Micah Nelson)	Release date: October 20, 2017; Label: Legacy Recordings	19	134	—	—	—	—
Last Man Standing	Release date: April 27, 2018; Label: Legacy Recordings	3	14	140	52	—	—
My Way	Release date: September 14, 2018; Label: Legacy Recordings	—	36	—	—	—	—
Ride Me Back Home	Release date: June 21, 2019; Label: Legacy Recordings	2	18	138	—	—	—
"—" denotes releases that did not chart

=== 2020s ===
Title	Details	Peak chart positions		
Title	Details	US	US Country	AUS
First Rose of Spring	Release date: July 3, 2020; Label: Legacy Recordings; Format: CD, LP, digital download, streaming	49	5	68
That's Life	Release date: February 26, 2021; Label: Legacy Recordings; Format: CD, LP, digital download, streaming	58	—	143
The Willie Nelson Family (with Amy, Bobbie, Lukas, Micah, and Paula Nelson)	Release date: November 19, 2021; Label: Legacy Recordings; Format: CD, LP, digital download, streaming	—	—	—
A Beautiful Time	Release date: April 29, 2022; Label: Legacy Recordings; Format: CD, LP, digital download, streaming	100	13	122
I Don't Know a Thing About Love	Release date: March 3, 2023; Label: Legacy Recordings; Format: CD, LP, digital download, streaming	—	—	—
Bluegrass	Release date: September 15, 2023; Label: Legacy Recordings; Format: CD, LP, digital download, streaming	—	—	—
The Border	Release date: May 31, 2024; Label: Legacy Recordings; Format: CD, LP, digital download, streaming	—	50	—
Last Leaf on the Tree	Release date: November 1, 2024; Label: Legacy Recordings; Format: CD, LP, digital download, streaming	—	40	—
Oh What a Beautiful World	Release date: April 25, 2025; Label: Legacy Recordings; Format: CD, LP, digital download, streaming	—	—	—
Workin' Man	Release date: November 7, 2025; Label: Legacy Recordings; Format: CD, LP, digital download, streaming	—	—	—
Dream Chaser	Release date: May 29, 2026; Label: Legacy Recordings; Format: CD, LP, digital download, streaming	—	—	—
"—" denotes releases that did not chart

== Live albums ==
Title	Details	Peak chart positions		Certifications
Title	Details	US Country	US	Certifications
Country Music Concert	Release date: 1966; Label: RCA Records	32	—	
Country Music Concert	Reissued as Willie Nelson Live: 1976; Label: RCA Records	5	—	
Willie and Family Live^{[C]}	Release date: November 1978; Label: Columbia Records	1	32	US: 4× Platinum; CAN: Gold
VH1 Storytellers (with Johnny Cash)	Release date: June 9, 1998; Label: American Recordings	25	56	
All of Me – Live in Concert	Release date: October 15, 2002; Label: BCI Music	—	—	
Willie Nelson & Friends - Stars & Guitars	Release date: November 5, 2002; Label: Lost Highway Records	18	133	
Live and Kickin'	Release date: June 24, 2003; Label: Lost Highway Records	4	42	
Live at Billy Bob's Texas	Release date: May 4, 2004; Label: Smith Music Group	27	168	
Outlaws and Angels	Release date: September 21, 2004; Label: Lost Highway Records	10	69	
Songs for Tsunami Relief: Austin to South Asia	Release date: April 12, 2005; Label: Lost Highway Records	57	—	
Live from Austin, TX	Release date: 2006; Label: New West Records	—	—	
Two Men with the Blues (with Wynton Marsalis)	Release date: July 8, 2008; Label: Blue Note	—	20	
Here We Go Again: Celebrating the Genius of Ray Charles (with Wynton Marsalis and Norah Jones)	Release date: March 29, 2011; Label: Blue Note Records	—	—	
Willie Nelson & Friends - Live at Third Man Records	Release date: 2013; Label: Third Man Records			
Willie Nelson Live at Budokan	Release Date: 1984 (LaserDisc); Label: CBS/Sony; Release date: November 18, 2022 (audio and digital media); Label: Legacy Recordings			
"—" denotes releases that did not chart

== Compilation albums ==
=== 1970s ===
Title	Details	Peak chart positions		Certifications
Title	Details	US Country	US	Certifications
Columbus Stockade Blues	Release date: 1970; Label: RCA Records	—	—	
Country Winners	Release date: 1973; Label: RCA Camden Records	—	—	
The Best Of	Release date: 1973; Label: United Artists Records	—	—	
Spotlight on Willie Nelson	Release date: 1974; Label: RCA Camden Records	—	—	
Country Willie	Release date: 1975; Label: United Artists Records	14	—	
What Can You Do to Me Now	Release date: 1975; Label: RCA Records	5	196	
Wanted! The Outlaws (with Waylon Jennings, Jessi Colter and Tompall Glaser)	Release date: January 12, 1976; Label: RCA Victor	1	10	US: 2× Platinum; CAN: Platinum
The Longhorn Jamboree Presents: Willie Nelson & His Friends	Release date: 1976; Label: Plantation Records	41	—	
Willie – Before His Time	Release date: 1977; Label: RCA Records	3	78	
There'll Be No Teardrops Tonight	Release date: 1978; Label: United Artists Records	46	—	
Hello Walls	Release Date: 1978; Label: Pickwick Records	-	-	
Face of a Fighter	Release date: 1978; Label: Lone Star Records	42	—	
Sweet Memories	Release date: 1979; Label: RCA Records	6	154	
"—" denotes releases that did not chart

=== 1980s ===
Title	Details	Peak chart positions				Certifications
Title	Details	US Country	US	AUS	NZ	Certifications
Danny Davis & Willie Nelson with the Nashville Brass	Release date: February 11, 1980; RCA Victor	14	—	—	—	
Always	Release date: 1980; Label: Sony	—	—	4	7	AUS: Platinum; NZ: Platinum
His Very Best	Release date: 1980; Label: Time Music	—	—	—	—	CAN: 2× Platinum
Greatest Hits (& Some That Will Be)	Release date: 1981; Label: Columbia Records	1	27	—	—	US: 4× Platinum; CAN: Platinum
The Minstrel Man	Release date: 1981; Label: RCA Records	39	148	—	—	
Everybody's Talkin'	Release date: 1981; Label: JB	—	—	25	—	AUS: Gold
The Best of Willie Nelson	Release date: 1982; Label: Capitol Records	62	201	—	—	
20 of the Best	Release date: 1982; Label: RCA Records	—	—	—	—	
The Winning Hand (with Kris Kristofferson, Dolly Parton and Brenda Lee)	Release date: December 1982; Label: Monument	4	109	—	—	
Songs from My Heart	Release date: 1984; Label: RCA Records	—	—	—	—	
Collectors Series	Release date: 1985; Label: RCA Records	62	—	—	—	
Half Nelson	Release date: 1985; Label: Columbia Records	10	178	—	—	US: Platinum
Love Songs	Release date: 1986; Label: EMD International	—	—	22	—	AUS: Gold
Walking the Line (with George Jones and Merle Haggard)	Release date: June 16, 1987; Label: Epic	39	—	—	—	
Collection	Release date: 1988; Label: CBS Records	—	—	—	—	
Evergreens	Release date: 1988; Label: Columbia Records	—	—	—	—	
"—" denotes releases that did not chart

=== 1990s ===
Title	Details	Peak chart positions				Certifications
Title	Details	US Country	US	AUS	CAN Country	Certifications
A Lifetime of Love Songs	Release date: February 1990; Label: J&B (JB401)	—	—	83	—	
Yours Always	Release date: 1991; Label: Madacy Entertainment	—	—	—	—	
Any Old Arms Won't Do	Release date: October 6, 1992; Label: Sound Solutions	—	—	—	—	
Gospel Favorites	Release date: 1994; Label: MCA Records	—	—	—	—	
Super Hits	Release date: May 31, 1994; Label: Legacy Recordings	34	98	—	6	US: 2× Platinum
The Essential Willie Nelson	Release date: August 1, 1995; Label: RCA Victor	—	—	—	—	
Super Hits, Volume 2	Release date: September 5, 1995; Label: Legacy Recordings	—	—	—	—	
Revolutions of Time... The Journey 1975/1993	Note: Titled The Greatest Hits in Australia; Release date: November 14, 1995; Label: Columbia Records	—	—	59	—	
Willie Standard Time	Release date: 1996; Label: Sony	—	—	—	—	
Nashville Was the Roughest...	Release date: June 2, 1998; Label: Bear Family Records	—	—	—	—	
16 Biggest Hits	Release date: July 14, 1998; Label: Columbia Records	29	—	—	—	US: Platinum
On the Road Again	Release date: June 1, 1999; Label: Columbia Records	—	—	—	—	
"—" denotes releases that did not chart

=== 2000s ===
Title	Details	Peak chart positions						Certifications
Title	Details	US Country	US	AUS	DEN	NZ	UK	Certifications
Good Ol' Country Singin'	Release date: September 19, 2000; Label: RCA Camden	—	—	—	—	—	—	
All the Songs I've Loved Before: 40 Unforgettable Songs	Release date: July 6, 2001; Label: Columbia Records	—	—	8	—	4	—	AUS: Gold; NZ: Platinum; SWE: Gold
Crazy: The Demo Sessions	Release date: February 11, 2003; Label: Sugar Hill Records	32	—	—	—	—	—	
Willie Nelson and Friends (with Asleep at the Wheel, Tanya Tucker, and Shirley Collie)	Release date: 2003; EMI Gold	39	—	—	—	—	—	
The Essential Willie Nelson	Release date: April 1, 2003; Label: Sony BMG	24	179	128	—	—	—	US: Platinum; UK: Silver
It's Been Rough and Rocky Travelin′	Release date: September 2, 2003; Bear Family Records	—	—	—	—	—	—	
Songs	Release date: February 15, 2005; Label: Lost Highway Records	13	64	—	—	—	—	
The Complete Atlantic Sessions	Release date: June 20, 2006; Label: Rhino Entertainment	—	80	—	—	—	—	
Natural Renegade: Opus Collection	Release date: 2007; Label: Sony BMG	—	61	—	—	—	—	
16 Biggest Hits, Volume II	Release date: August 7, 2007; Label: Legacy Recordings	—	—	—	—	—	—	
One Hell of a Ride	Release date: April 1, 2008; Label: Columbia Records	46	—	—	—	—	—	
Playlist: The Very Best of Willie Nelson	Release date: April 29, 2008; Label: Legacy Recordings	61	—	—	—	—	—	
Legend: The Best of Willie Nelson	Release date: May 5, 2008; Label: RCA Records	—	—	49	3	3	16	UK: Gold; NZ: Gold
Naked Willie	Release date: March 17, 2009; Label: Legacy Recordings	29	193	—	—	—	—	
Lost Highway	Release date: August 11, 2009; Label: Lost Highway Records	29	173	—	—	—	—	
"—" denotes releases that did not chart

=== 2010s and 2020s ===
Title	Details	Peak positions
Title	Details	US Country
The Classic Christmas Album	Release date: October 2, 2012; Label: Columbia/Legacy	27
Country: Willie Nelson	Release date: November 27, 2012; Label: Legacy	63
Greatest Hits	Release date: November 3, 2023; Label: Legacy	34

== Soundtrack albums ==
Title	Details	Peak chart positions					Certifications
Title	Details	US Country	US	AUS	CAN Country	CAN	Certifications
The Electric Horseman	Release date: 1979; Label: Columbia Records	3	52	—	3	—	US: Gold
Honeysuckle Rose (credited as "Willie Nelson and Family")	Release date: 1980; Label: Columbia Records	1	11	34	4	24	US: 2× Platinumn; AUS: Gold; CAN: Gold

== Video albums and television specials ==
Title	Details	Certifications
Willie Nelson at Lake Tahoe	Release date: February 11, 1979 (TV); Label: HBO	
Willie Nelson's 4th of July Celebration	Release date: 1979 (Film) / 2000 (DVD); Label: Wizard Video	
The Willie Nelson Show with Ray Charles	Release date: 1984 (Film) / 2002, 2006 (DVD); Label: Eagle Rock / Rhino	
Greatest Hits Live	Release date: 1986 (VHS) / 1999 (DVD); Label: Texas Pyramid	
Willie Nelson, Texas Style	Release date: March 5, 1988 (TV); Label: CBS	
Some Enchanted Evening with Willie Nelson	Release date: August 1, 1989; 2001 (VHS) / 2004; February 8, 2005 (DVD); Label: Lionsgate / Echo Bridge	
The Highwaymen Live! American Outlaws	Release date: 1990 (VHS) / 2016 (DVD); Label: CMV Enterprises	
Willie Nelson and Friends: Nashville Superstar - The Great Outlaw Valentine Concert / On the Road Again	Release date: February 14, 1991 (VHS) / 2002, 2008 (DVD); Label: MVD Visual	
Willie Nelson: My Life	Release date: 1991 (Film) / 1997 (VHS) / 2002 (DVD); Label: Cargo Films	
On the Road Again - Includes Songs from the I.R.S. Tapes	Release date: June 8, 1992 (VHS); Label: Wild Oak Pictures	
The Big Six-0	Release date: May 22, 1993 (VHS); Label: CBS Video	
Tootsie's Orchid Lounge: Where the Music Began w/ Roger Miller & Kris Kristofferson	Release date: September 25, 1995 (VHS) / July 26, 2005 (DVD); Label: Kultur Video / White Star	
Willie: The Life and Music of Willie Nelson	Release date: 1996 (CD-Rom); Label: Graphix Zone	
VH1 Storytellers: Johnny Cash & Willie Nelson	Release date: May 12, 1997 (TV); Label: VH1	
Willie Nelson: Down Home	Release date: August 14, 1997 (TV); Label: TV Special	
Willie Nelson at the Teatro	Release date: 1998 (Film) / October 26, 1999 (VHS) / 2017 (DVD); Label: PolyGram Video / Modern Classics	
Austin City Limits: Willie Nelson and Family with Leon Russell	Release date: February 26, 2000 (TV); Label: PBS	
Live in Amsterdam	Release date: July 3, 2001 (DVD); Label: Image Entertainment	
Willie Nelson: Still Is Still Moving	Release date: October 2, 2002 (TV); Label: American Masters / Eagle Rock	
Willie Nelson & Friends – Stars & Guitars	Release date: 2002 (TV); Label: USA Network	
Willie Nelson and Friends - Live and Kickin'	Release date: May 26, 2003 (TV) / August 23, 2005 (DVD); Label: Lost Highway	
The Highwaymen - On the Road Again	Release date: July 15, 2003 (DVD); Label: White Star	
Live at Billy Bob's Texas	Release date: May 4, 2004 (CD/DVD); Label: Image / Smith Music Group	
Willie Nelson and Friends - Outlaws and Angels	Release date: October 19, 2004 (DVD); Label: Eagle Vision	AUS: Gold; CAN: Gold
Songs for Tsunami Relief: Austin to South Asia	Release date: April 12, 2005 (DVD); Label: Lost Highway	
The Life and Times of Willie Nelson: Red-Headed Stranger	Release date: 2005 (DVD); Label: Immortal	
Live Forever – In the Studio with the Highwaymen	Release date: November 8, 2005 (DVD); Label: Capitol Nashville/EMI	
Live from Austin, TX	Release date: May 2, 2006 (DVD); Label: New West Records	US: Gold
From Willie With Love	Release date: October 17, 2006 (DVD); Label: Immortal	
Last of the Breed - Live in Concert	Release date: August 28, 2007 (DVD); Label: A&E Home Video	
Live from Jazz at Lincoln Center, NYC w/ Wynton Marsalis	Release date: October 28, 2008 (DVD); Label: Eagle Rock	
Willie and the Wheel w/ Asleep at the Wheel	Release date: 2008 (Film); Label: The Zalman King Company	
Willie Nelson and Wynton Marsalis Play the Music of Ray Charles	Release date: October 20, 2009 (DVD); Label: A&E Home Video	
Live at Soundstage	Release date: February 25, 2010 (DVD); Label: Soundstage	
Live at the US Festival 1983	Release date: November 15, 2011 (DVD); Label: Shout! Factory	
Legends in Concert	Release date: 2012 (DVD); Label: One Media	
Live in Concert	Release date: January 15, 2013 (DVD); Label: Imv. / Blueline Prod.	
Willie Nelson & Friends from Third Man Records	Release date: June 23, 2013 (TV); Label: CMT Crossroads	
Live	Release date: December 3, 2013 (DVD); Label: Imv. / Blueline Prod.	
On The Road Again: A Music Documentary	Release date: December 2, 2014 (DVD); Label: Imv. / Blueline Prod.	
The Highwaymen: Friends Till the End	Release date: May 27, 2016 (TV); Label: American Masters	

== Other appearances ==
Year	Song	Album
1992	"Blue Hawaii"	Honeymoon in Vegas
1994	"Today I Started Loving You Again"	Mama's Hungry Eyes: A Tribute to Merle Haggard
1995	"Bird on a Wire"	Tower of Song: The Songs of Leonard Cohen
1995	"One After 909"	Come Together: America Salutes the Beatles
1997	"Peach Pickin' Time Down in Georgia"	The Songs of Jimmie Rodgers: A Tribute
1999	"Ride 'em Jewboy"	Pearls in the Snow: The Songs of Kinky Friedman
2001	"Marie"	Poet: A Tribute to Townes Van Zandt
2002	"She Loves My Automobile"	Sharp Dressed Men: A Tribute to ZZ Top
2002	"American Tune"	Celebrate America!: Songs for the American Spirit
2002	"That's Me Without You"	Caught in the Webb: A Tribute to the Legendary Webb Pierce
2003	"Please Come Home for Christmas"	A Very Special Acoustic Christmas
2004	"You Are My Flower"	The Unbroken Circle: The Musical Heritage of the Carter Family
2005	"Motormouth" (with Jamie Oldaker and JJ Cale)	Mad Dogs and Okies
2005	"He Was a Friend of Mine"	Brokeback Mountain: Original Motion Picture Soundtrack
2006	"The Legend"	The Pilgrim: A Celebration of Kris Kristofferson
2006	"This Time I Almost Made It" (with Shelby Lynne)	She Was Country When Country Wasn't Cool: A Tribute to Barbara Mandrell
2006	"If I Could Only Fly" (with Merle Haggard)	If I Could Only Fly: A Tribute to Blaze Foley
2007	"Imagine"	Instant Karma: The Amnesty International Campaign to Save Darfur
2007	"I Hear You Knockin'"	Goin' Home: A Tribute to Fats Domino
2007	"If I Were a Carpenter" (with Sheryl Crow)	Anchored in Love: A Tribute to June Carter Cash
2008	"What a Difference a Day Makes"	The Imus Ranch Record
2011	"Desperados Waiting for a Train"	This One's for Him: A Tribute to Guy Clark
2012	"A Peaceful Solution"	Occupy This Album
2016	"Forever Country" (with Artists of Then, Now, & Forever)	single only
2017	"The Only Man Wilder Than Me" (with Merle Haggard)	Music from The American Epic Sessions: Original Motion Picture Soundtrack
2017	"Old Fashioned Love" (with Merle Haggard)	Music from The American Epic Sessions: Original Motion Picture Soundtrack
2018	"Border Song"	Restoration: Reimagining the Songs of Elton John and Bernie Taupin
2018	"Old Friends"	King of the Road: A Tribute to Roger Miller
2022	"Live Forever"	Live Forever: A Tribute to Billy Joe Shaver

=== Live ===
Year	Song	Album
1993	"What Was it You Wanted"	The 30th Anniversary Concert Celebration
2000	"Peach Picking Time Down in Georgia"	Farm Aid: Keep America Growing, Vol. 1
2000	"Sitting in Limbo"	Farm Aid: Keep America Growing, Vol. 1
2001	"America the Beautiful"	America: A Tribute to Heroes
2007	"Blue Eyes Crying in the Rain" (with Vince Gill and Albert Lee)	Crossroads Guitar Festival 2007
2007	"On the Road Again" (with Sheryl Crow, Vince Gill and Albert Lee)	Crossroads Guitar Festival 2007
2011	"The Great Divide"	The Bridge School Concerts: 25th Anniversary Edition
2012	"I Still Miss Someone"	We Walk the Line: A Celebration of the Music of Johnny Cash
2012	"If I Were a Carpenter" (with Sheryl Crow)	We Walk the Line: A Celebration of the Music of Johnny Cash
2012	"Highwayman" (with Kris Kristofferson, Jamey Johnson and Shooter Jennings)	We Walk the Line: A Celebration of the Music of Johnny Cash

=== Guest ===
Year	Song	Album
1977	"Luckenbach, Texas (Back to the Basics of Love)" (with Waylon Jennings)	Ol' Waylon
1978	"One Paper Kid" (with Emmylou Harris)	Quarter Moon in a Ten Cent Town
1979	"Waltz Across Texas" (with Ernest Tubb)	The Legend and the Legacy
1983	"Just to Satisfy You (with Waylon Jennings)	Waylon and Company
1984	"Seven Spanish Angels" (with Ray Charles)	Friendship
1984	"To All the Girls I've Loved Before" (with Julio Iglesias)	1100 Bel Air Place
1985	"Are There Any More Real Cowboys" (with Neil Young)	Old Ways
1986	"I Hate Love" (with David Allan Coe and Waylon Jennings)	Son of the South
1987	"I'm Sending You a Big Bouquet of Roses" and "I'm So Lonesome I Could Cry" (with Jack Walrath)	Master of Suspense
1987	credited as musician (with Rattlesnake Annie)	Rattlesnake Annie
1994	"A Foggy Day" (with Frank Sinatra)	Duets II
1994	"Man with the Blues" (with Buckwheat Zydeco)	Five Card Stud
1995	"Rainy Day Blues" (with Tab Benoit)	Standing on the Bank
1995	"These Eyes" (with Ray Wylie Hubbard)	Lost Train of Thought
1995	"Fire to Fire" (with Tanya Tucker)	Fire to Fire
1996	"The Warmth of the Sun" (with The Beach Boys)	Stars and Stripes Vol. 1
1996	"Give Me Back My Job" (with Carl Perkins, Bono, Johnny Cash & Tom Petty)	Go Cat Go
1996	"Matchbox (with Carl Perkins)	Go Cat Go
1996	"Wild Texas Wind" (with Carl Perkins)	Go Cat Go
1996	"All Night Long" (with Jimmy Sturr)	Polka! All Night Long
1996	"Big Ball in Cowtown" (with Jimmy Sturr)	Polka! All Night Long
1996	"Tavern in the Town" (with Jimmy Sturr)	Polka! All Night Long
1996	"Nickel and a Spoon" (with Alejandro Escovedo)	With These Hands
1997	"Pretty Paper" (with Asleep at the Wheel)	Merry Texas Christmas, Y'all
1997	"Silent Night" (with Asleep at the Wheel and Don Walser)	Merry Texas Christmas, Y'all
1997	"Night Life" (with B.B. King)	Deuces Wild
1998	"The Borderline" (with Chris Ledoux)	One Road Man
1998	"The Oldest Baby in the World" (with Donnie Fritts)	Lucky 13
1998	"It Don't Get Any Better Than This" (with George Jones, Waylon Jennings, Bobby Bare and Johnny Cash)	It Don't Get Any Better Than This
1998	"Slow Dancing" (with U2)	If God Will Send His Angels
1998	"Okie from Muskogee" (with Leon Russell)	Legend in My Time: Hank Wilson, Vol. 3
1998	"He Stopped Loving Her Today" (with Leon Russell)	Legend in My Time: Hank Wilson, Vol. 3
1999	"Two Sleepy People" (with Crystal Gayle)	Crystal Gayle Sings the Heart and Soul of Hoagy Carmichael
1999	"Where Has My Country Gone" (with Ondar)	Back Tuva Future
1999	"Life's Railway to Heaven" (with Patsy Cline)	Duets, Vol. 1
1999	"Old Friends" (with Jeannie Seely)	Been There...Sung That!
1999	"Going Away Party" (with Asleep at the Wheel and The Manhattan Transfer)	Ride with Bob
2000	"On the Other Side" (with Janis Ian)	God and the FBI
2001	"The Thrill is Gone" (with B.B. King)	Here & There: The Uncollected B.B. King
2001	"Marie" (with Townes Van Zandt)	Texas Rain
2001	"No Lonesome Tune" (with Townes Van Zandt)	Texas Rain
2001	"Threadbare Gypsy Soul" (with Pat Green)	Three Days
2002	"Goodnight Irene" (with the Nitty Gritty Dirt Band and Tom Petty)	Will the Circle Be Unbroken, Volume III
2002	"Beer for My Horses" (with Toby Keith)	Unleashed
2002	"Silver Eagle Meets the Great Speckled Bird" (with Porter Wagoner)	Unplugged
2002	"Family Bible" (with Porter Wagoner)	Unplugged
2002	"Whiskey River" (with Trick Pony)	On a Mission
2002	"Pretty Paper" (with Carly Simon)	Christmas Is Almost Here
2003	"For What It's Worth" (with Bill Evans)	Big Fun
2003	"If Teardrops Were Diamonds" (with Dwight Yoakam)	Population Me
2003	"Write One for Me" (with Ringo Starr)	Ringo Rama
2003	"A Showman's Life" (with Gary Allan)	See if I Care
2003	"Time Goes By" (with The Mavericks)	The Mavericks
2003	"Like a Soldier" (with Johnny Cash)	Unearthed
2003	"Pretty Paper" (with Kenny Chesney)	All I Want for Christmas Is a Real Good Tan
2004	"It Was a Very Good Year (with Ray Charles)	Genius Loves Company
2004	"Reno Blues (Philadelphia Lawyer)" (with Merle Haggard)	Haggard Like Never Before
2004	"Homesick Blues" (with Bobby Charles)	Last Train to Memphis
2004	"Full Moon on the Bayou" (with Bobby Charles and Neil Young)	Last Train to Memphis
2004	"I Remember When" (with Bobby Charles)	Last Train to Memphis
2004	"Ambushin' Bastard" (with Bobby Charles)	Last Train to Memphis
2004	"I Don't See Me" (with Bobby Charles)	Last Train to Memphis
2004	"La Contestación" (with Los Lonely Boys)	Los Lonely Boys
2004	"Such a Much" (with Dr. John and Snooks Eaglin)	N'Awlinz: Dis, Dat or D'udda
2004	"Time Marches On" (with Dr. John, B.B. King and the Dirty Dozen Brass Band)	N'Awlinz: Dis, Dat or D'udda
2004	"One More Cowboy" (with Dan Hicks & His Hot Licks)	Selected Shorts
2004	"She is Still Moving to Me" (with Toots and the Maytals)	True Love
2005	"Busted" (with Ray Charles)	Genius & Friends
2005	"Blueberry Hill" (with Jimmy Sturr)	Shake, Rattle, & Polka!
2005	"Stormy Sky" (with Daniel Lanois and Emmylou Harris)	Rockets
2005	"Rainbow Connection" (with Paul Williams)	I'm Going Back There Someday
2005	"Guardian Angel" (with The Bellamy Brothers)	Angels and Outlaws, vol. 1
2006	"In Your Hands" (with Nils Lofgren)	Sacred Weapon
2006	"Outlaws" (with Los Lonely Boys)	Sacred
2006	"Family Bible" (with Charley Pride)	Pride and Joy: A Gospel Music Collection
2006	"Couple More Years" (with Jerry Lee Lewis)	Last Man Standing
2006	"I Never Cared for You" (with Del Castillo)	Brotherhood
2007	"The Lord Knows I'm Drinkin'" (with Bill Anderson)	Whisperin' Bluegrass
2007	"On the Road Again" (with Deana Carter)	The Chain
2007	"Pancho and Lefty" (with Johnny Bush)	Kashmere Gardens Mud: A Tribute to Houston's Country Soul
2007	"Send Me the Pillow You Dream On" (with Johnny Bush)	Kashmere Gardens Mud: A Tribute to Houston's Country Soul
2007	"Willie's Guitar" (with John Anderson and Merle Haggard)	Easy Money
2007	"Back to Earth" (with Bobbie Nelson)	Audiobiography
2007	"If I Were a Carpenter" (with Sheryl Crow)	Anchored in Love: A Tribute to June Carter Cash
2007	"Pretty Paper" (with Asleep at the Wheel)	Santa Loves to Boogie
2008	"The Willie Waltz" (with Greta Gaines)	Whiskey Thoughts
2008	"Lost Highway" (with Kurt Nilsen)	Rise to the Occasion
2008	"That Lucky Old Sun (Just Rolls Around Heaven All Day" (with Kenny Chesney)	Lucky Old Sun
2008	"Promises, Promises" (with Dr. John)	City that Care Forgot
2009	"Back to Earth" (with Melonie Cannon)	And the Wheels Turn
2009	"Rose in Paradise" (with Chris Young)	The Man I Want to Be
2009	"The One That Got Away" (with Gail Swanson)	Simple Truth
2009	"Half a Heart" (with Gail Swanson)	Simple Truth
2009	"This Train" (with Ziggy Marley)	Family Time
2009	"Have I Told You Lately That I Love You" (with Amy Hānaialiʻi Gilliom)	Friends and Family of Hawaii
2009	"Little Dealer Boy" (with Stephen Colbert)	A Colbert Christmas: The Greatest Gift of All!
2009	"(What's So Funny 'Bout) Peace, Love and Understanding" (with Stephen Colbert, Elvis Costello, Feist, Toby Keith, and John Legend)	A Colbert Christmas: The Greatest Gift of All!
2010	"I Know We Won" (with The Doobie Brothers)	World Gone Crazy
2010	"Sound of Your Memory" (with Lukas Nelson & Promise of the Real)	Promise of the Real
2010	"Fathers and Mothers" (with Lukas Nelson & Promise of the Real)	Promise of the Real
2010	"Homegrown" (with Mishka)	Talk About
2010	"Whiskey River" (with Jerry Lee Lewis)	Mean Old Man
2010	"If You See Me Getting Smaller" (with Jimmy Webb)	Just Across the River
2010	"Truck Driver's Blues" (with Asleep at the Wheel and Leon Rausch)	It's a Good Day
2010	"Merry Christmas Baby" (with Jessica Simpson)	Happy Christmas
2010	"Touch Me" (with Juice Newton)	Duets: Friends & Memories
2010	"Funny How Time Slips Away" (with Juice Newton)	Duets: Friends & Memories
2010	"Lady Be Good" (with Johnny Gimble)	Celebrating with Friends
2010	"King Cotton Blues" (with 7 Walkers)	7 Walkers
2011	"Working Man Blues" (with Merle Haggard)	Working in Tennessee
2011	"Don't Call Me" (with Heather Myles)	In the Wind
2011	"I'll Shut Up Now (with The Dirt Drifters)	This Is Our Blood
2011	"Family Bible" (with The Blind Boys of Alabama)	Take the High Road
2011	"Behind Me Now" (with Amos Lee)	Mission Bell
2011	"On the Sunny Side of the Street" (with Tony Bennett)	Duets II
2011	"Superman" (with Snoop Dogg)	Doggumentary
2011	"Road to Surrender" (with Randy Travis and Kris Kristofferson)	Anniversary Celebration
2011	"To All the Girls I've Loved Before" (with Julio Iglesias)	1
2012	Easy" (with Lionel Richie)	Tuskegee
2012	"Ragged Company" (with Grace Potter & the Nocturnals)	The Lion the Beast the Beat
2012	"Honky Tonk Kid" (with Aaron Watson)	Real Good Time
2012	"Don't You Ever Get Tired (Of Hurting Me)" (with Jamey Johnson)	Living for a Song: A Tribute to Hank Cochran
2012	"Everything But You" (with Jamey Johnson, Vince Gill and Leon Russell)	Living for a Song: A Tribute to Hank Cochran
2012	"Living for a Song" (with Jamey Johnson, Hank Cochran, Merle Haggard and Kris Kristofferson)	Living for a Song: A Tribute to Hank Cochran
2012	"Blue Eyes Crying in the Rain" (with Jack Johnson and Ben Harper)	Jack Johnson and Friends – Best of Kokua Festival
2013	"Hard to Be a Hippie" (with Billy Currington)	We Are Tonight
2013	"Coconut Tree" (with Kenny Chesney)	Life on a Rock
2013	"Crazy" (with Paul Anka)	Duets
2014	"Solo Un Momento" (with Vicentico)	Ultimo Acto
2014	"Songbird" (with Eric Clapton)	The Breeze: An Appreciation of JJ Cale
2014	"Starbound" (with Eric Clapton and Derek Trucks)	The Breeze: An Appreciation of JJ Cale
2014	"Only Me" (with Rhonda Vincent)	Only Me
2014	"Hard to Be an Outlaw" (with Billy Joe Shaver)	Long in the Tooth
2014	"Bubba Garcia's" (with Bill Anderson)	Life!
2014	"Make You Feel My Love" (with Engelbert Humperdinck)	Engelbert Calling
2014	"Troublesome Waters" (with Carlene Carter)	Carter Girl
2014	"It Ain't You" (with Ray Benson)	A Little Piece
2015	"Bloody Mary Morning" (with Kinky Friedman)	The Loneliest Man I Ever Met
2015	"When I Go" (with Judy Collins)	Strangers Again
2015	"Navajo Trail" (with Asleep at the Wheel and The Quebe Sisters Band)	Still the King: Celebrating the Music of Bob Wills and His Texas Playboys
2015	"Are You Sure" (with Kacey Musgraves)	Pageant Material
2015	"In Texas" (with T.G. Sheppard)	Legendary Friends & Country Duets
2015	"Twelve Days of Christmas" (with Rhonda Vincent)	Christmas Time
2016	"Sinner" (with Aaron Lewis)	Sinner
2016	"Last Night I Had the Strangest Dream" (with Charles Lloyd & the Marvels)	I Long to See You
2016	"Lay Me Down" (with Loretta Lynn)	Full Circle
2016	"I Want to Spend My Life with You" (with Frankie Miller)	Frankie Miller's Double Take
2016	"Night Life" (with Cyndi Lauper)	Detour
2016	"A Willie Nice Christmas" (with Kacey Musgraves)	A Very Kacey Christmas
2024	"SMOKE HOUR ★ WILLIE NELSON" (with Beyoncé)	Cowboy Carter
2024	"SMOKE HOUR II" (with Beyoncé)	Cowboy Carter

== Notes ==
- A Milk Cow Blues peaked at number 9 on the RPM Country Albums chart.
- B American Classic peaked at number 19 on the Canadian Albums Chart.
- C Willie and Family Live peaked at number 1 on the RPM Country Albums chart and number 35 on the RPM Top Albums chart.
