= Old Friends =

Old Friends or Old Friend may refer to:

== Music ==
=== Albums ===
- Old Friends, a 1982 album by Willie Nelson and Roger Miller
- Old Friends (Guy Clark album), a 1988 album by Guy Clark
- Old Friends (André Previn album), 1992
- Old Friends (1997 Simon and Garfunkel album), a 1997 box set by Simon and Garfunkel
- Old Friends: Live on Stage, a 2004 concert album by Simon and Garfunkel
- Old Friends (The Expos album), 2007

=== Songs ===
- "Old Friends" (Simon & Garfunkel song), 1968
- “Old Friends” by Stephen Sondheim in the musical Merrily We Roll Along
- "Old Friend" from the 1986 Phyllis Hyman album "Living All Alone"
- "Old Friends" (Pinegrove song), 2016
- "Old Friend", a song by Chris de Burgh from the 1975 album Spanish Train and Other Stories
- "Old Friend", a song by Hopsin from the 2013 album Knock Madness
- "Old Friend", a song by Elton John & Nik Kershaw from the 1993 album Duets
- "Old Friend", a song by Indian singer Shakthisree Gopalan, 2023
- "Old Friends", a song by Everything but the Girl from the 1991 album Worldwide
- "Old Friends", a song by Dogwood from the 1998 album Dogwood
- "Old Friends", a song by The Bear Quartet from the 2000 album My War
- "Old Friends", a song by Stuart A. Staples from the 2006 album Leaving Songs
- "Old Friends (Ben Rector song)", 2018
- "Old Friends", a song by Coldplay from the 2019 album Everyday Life
- "Old Friends", a song by Willie Nelson and Roger Miller from the 1982 album Old Friends

== Television ==
- "Old Friends" (Alvin and the Chipmunks), a 1987 episode
- "Old Friends" (Baywatch), a 1990 episode
- "Old Friends" (Burn Notice), a 2007 episode
- "Old Friends" (The Golden Girls), a 1987 episode
- "Old Friends" (Midnight Caller), a 1990 episode

== Books and comics ==
- Old Friends (Angel comic), a series of comic books based on the Angel television series
- Old Friends (Bernice anthology), a 2006 collection of novellas featuring the Dr. Who character Bernice Summerfield

== Places ==
- Old Friends Archeological Site, a Quaker historical site in Rhode Island
- Old Friends Equine, a horse farm in Kentucky
