= Collector's Series =

Collector's Series may refer to:

- Collector's Series (Dolly Parton album)
- Collector's Series (The Judds album)
- Collector's Series (Willie Nelson album)

== See also ==
- The Collector's Series, Volume One, Celine Dion album
- Capitol Collectors Series (disambiguation)
