= Outlaws and Angels =

Outlaws and Angels may refer to:

- Outlaws and Angels (film), 2016 Western directed by JT Mollner
- Outlaws and Angels (album), 2004 Willie Nelson live album
