= His Best =

His Best may refer to:

- His Best (Bo Diddley album), 1997
- His Best (Little Walter album), 1997
- His Best (Howlin' Wolf album), 1997
- His Best (Sonny Boy Williamson II album), 1997
- His Best – The Electric B. B. King, 1968

== See also ==
- His Very Best, a 1980 album by Willie Nelson
