= The Expos (band) =

Canadian reggae band

- Origin: Newmarket, Ontario, Canada
- Genre: Reggae
- Label: Stomp
- Members: Reed Neagle; Michel Verrier; Christopher Shannon; Adam Pariselli

The Expos are a Canadian reggae band from Newmarket, Ontario. Their music blends reggae with psychedelia and heavy drums.

== History ==
The band formed in 2003 under the name "The Donuts". Their debut album, "Old Friends", was released in 2005 under that name. The album was re-released in 2006 under the new record label, Stomp, and their new name, "The Expos". The recording featured a horn section and Hammond organ.

In 2009 the band released an album, Blackwater. The tracks included more harmony and thoughtful lyrics than their earlier work, as well as showcasing horns, drum tones, Hammond organ music and Neagle's vocals, which were enhanced by the use of an old fashion E-V Model 635A microphone.

In 2013 the band performed at the Montreal Ska Fest.

== Band members ==
- Reed Neagle – vocals, drums
- Michel Verrier – vocals, organ
- Christopher Shannon – backing vocals, bass guitar
- Adam Pariselli – backing vocals, guitar

== Discography ==
- 2007: Old Friends
- 2009: Blackwater
- 2012: Lake House

=== Compilations ===
- 2006: Mad Butcher Records Skannibal Part 6 Germany
- 2007: One Big Family Vol. 3 Japan
- 2008: Salad Gold 15 Sampler Canada
