= List of Top Country LPs number ones of 1982 =

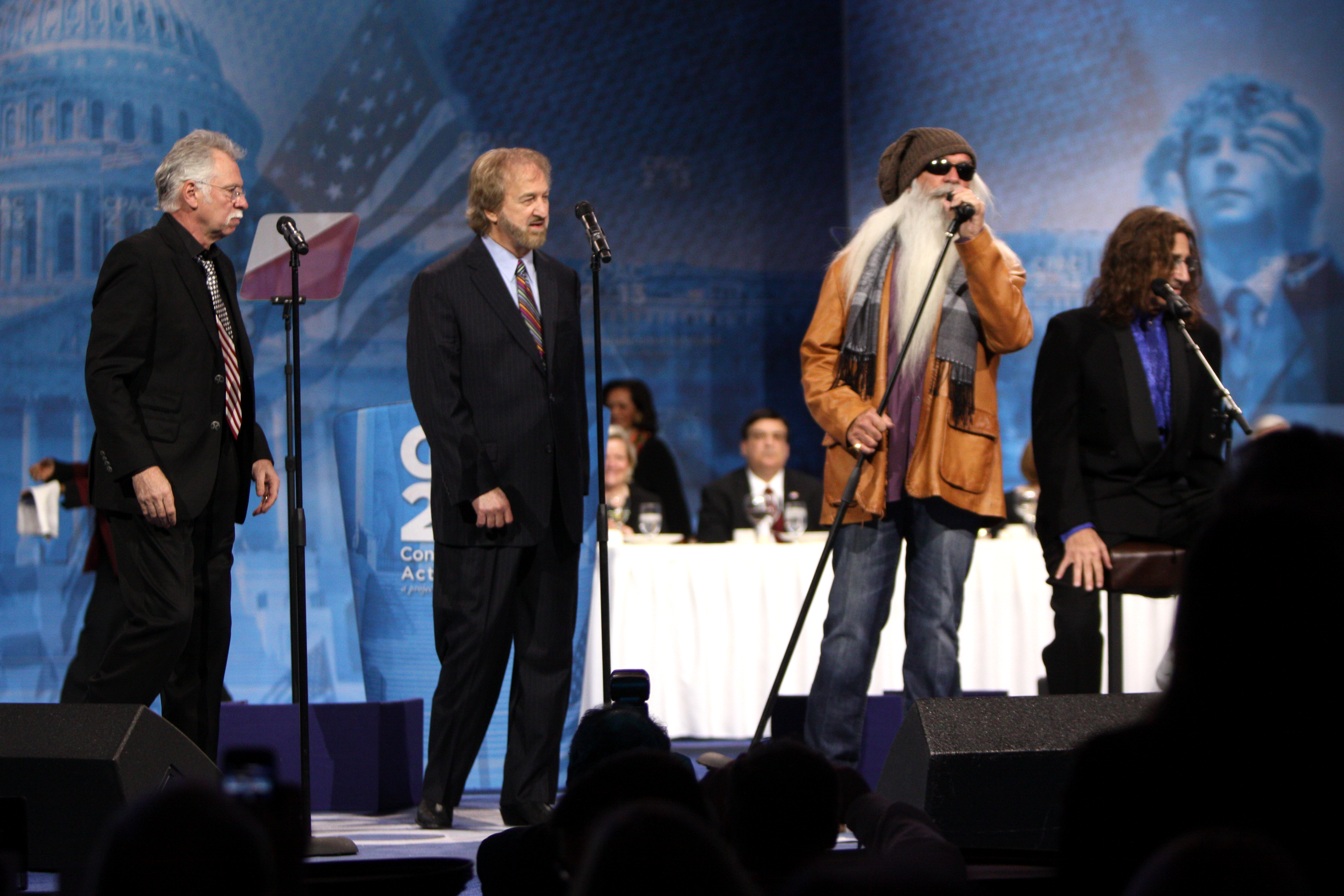
Bobbie Sue was a number one for the Oak Ridge Boys.

Top Country Albums is a chart that ranks the top-performing country music albums in the United States, published by Billboard. In 1982, six different albums topped the chart, which was at the time published under the title Top Country LPs, based on sales reports submitted by a representative sample of stores nationwide.

Willie Nelson and the band Alabama dominated the top of the chart in 1982; both acts spent more than 20 weeks at number one, and only four of the year's 52 issues did not feature one of the two acts in the top spot. In the issue of Billboard dated January 2, Alabama was at number one with Feels So Right. The album had already spent 17 weeks atop the chart in 1981 and would continue to return to number one in the first half of 1982, going on to achieve a final total of 28 weeks at number one, a new record for the country albums chart. Three weeks after Feels So Right was displaced from the top spot, the band was back at number one with its next album, Mountain Music. That album went on to spend 14 weeks at number one in 1982, the most by any LP during the year, and would add a further 14 the following year to equal the band's own record of 28 weeks atop the chart with an album. Alabama would go on to become the most successful country act of the 1980s, with ten number one LPs during the decade, a run interrupted only by the seasonal album Christmas in 1985. Mountain Music was the band's best-selling LP, selling over 5 million copies.

Nelson spent a single week at number one in January with the compilation Greatest Hits (& Some That Will Be) and then returned to the top spot in May with Always on My Mind, which spent 22 non-consecutive weeks atop the chart. Although it consisted largely of cover versions of pop classics rather than original material, the latter album was hugely successful, selling over four million copies and being honored as Album of the Year by the Country Music Association. It was the longest-running of Nelson's 13 career number ones, spending twice as long atop the chart as any of his other chart-toppers. Only two other acts reached number one in 1982. The Oak Ridge Boys spent three weeks in the top spot in the spring with Bobbie Sue, and in November Ricky Skaggs topped the chart for a single week with Highways & Heartaches. It was the first of four chart-topping albums for Skaggs, all of which occurred in a four-year portion of a career that has spanned from the late 1950s into the 21st century.

== Chart history ==
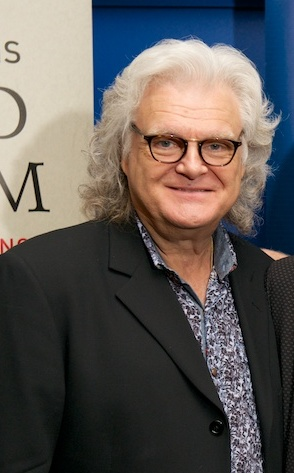
Ricky Skaggs had his first chart-topping album in 1982.

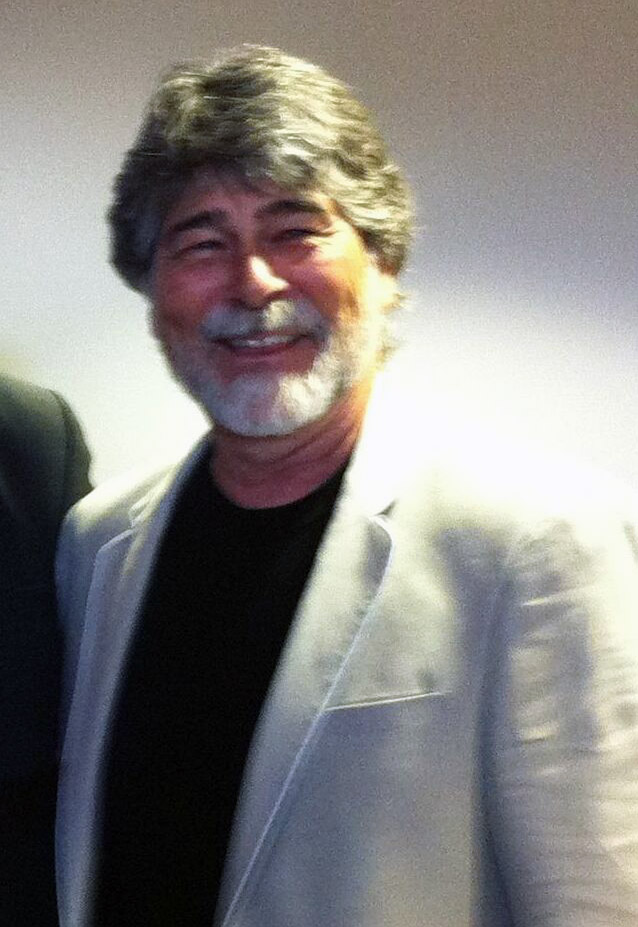
Randy Owen, lead singer of Alabama. The band had two long-running number ones in 1982

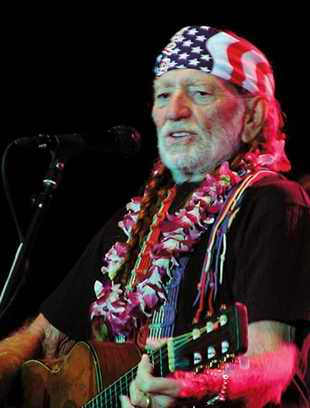
Willie Nelson spent a total of 23 weeks at number one in 1982

| Issue date | Title | Artist(s) | Ref. |
|---|---|---|---|
| January 2 | Feels So Right | Alabama | |
| January 9 | Feels So Right | Alabama | |
| January 16 | Greatest Hits (& Some That Will Be) | Willie Nelson | |
| January 23 | Feels So Right | Alabama | |
| January 30 | Feels So Right | Alabama | |
| February 6 | Feels So Right | Alabama | |
| February 13 | Feels So Right | Alabama | |
| February 20 | Feels So Right | Alabama | |
| February 27 | Feels So Right | Alabama | |
| March 6 | Feels So Right | Alabama | |
| March 13 | Feels So Right | Alabama | |
| March 20 | Feels So Right | Alabama | |
| March 27 | Bobbie Sue | The Oak Ridge Boys | |
| April 3 | Bobbie Sue | The Oak Ridge Boys | |
| April 10 | Bobbie Sue | The Oak Ridge Boys | |
| April 17 | Mountain Music | Alabama | |
| April 24 | Mountain Music | Alabama | |
| May 1 | Mountain Music | Alabama | |
| May 8 | Mountain Music | Alabama | |
| May 15 | Mountain Music | Alabama | |
| May 22 | Always on My Mind | Willie Nelson | |
| May 29 | Always on My Mind | Willie Nelson | |
| June 5 | Mountain Music | Alabama | |
| June 12 | Always on My Mind | Willie Nelson | |
| June 19 | Always on My Mind | Willie Nelson | |
| June 26 | Mountain Music | Alabama | |
| July 3 | Mountain Music | Alabama | |
| July 10 | Mountain Music | Alabama | |
| July 17 | Always on My Mind | Willie Nelson | |
| July 24 | Always on My Mind | Willie Nelson | |
| July 31 | Always on My Mind | Willie Nelson | |
| August 7 | Always on My Mind | Willie Nelson | |
| August 14 | Always on My Mind | Willie Nelson | |
| August 21 | Always on My Mind | Willie Nelson | |
| August 28 | Always on My Mind | Willie Nelson | |
| September 4 | Always on My Mind | Willie Nelson | |
| September 11 | Always on My Mind | Willie Nelson | |
| September 18 | Always on My Mind | Willie Nelson | |
| September 25 | Always on My Mind | Willie Nelson | |
| October 2 | Always on My Mind | Willie Nelson | |
| October 9 | Always on My Mind | Willie Nelson | |
| October 16 | Always on My Mind | Willie Nelson | |
| October 23 | Always on My Mind | Willie Nelson | |
| October 30 | Always on My Mind | Willie Nelson | |
| November 6 | Always on My Mind | Willie Nelson | |
| November 13 | Always on My Mind | Willie Nelson | |
| November 20 | Highways & Heartaches | Ricky Skaggs | |
| November 27 | Mountain Music | Alabama | |
| December 4 | Mountain Music | Alabama | |
| December 11 | Mountain Music | Alabama | |
| December 18 | Mountain Music | Alabama | |
| December 25 | Mountain Music | Alabama | |
