= Ain't That a Kick in the Head =

1960 song by composer Jimmy Van Heusen and lyricist Sammy Cahn

Single by Dean Martin
- B-side: "Humdinger"
- Released: July 1960
- Recorded: May 10, 1960
- Genre: Swing
- Length: 2:24
- Label: Capitol
- Composer: Jimmy Van Heusen
- Lyricist: Sammy Cahn
- Producer: Lee Gillette

Dean Martin singles chronology
"Just in Time" (1960)	"Ain't That a Kick in the Head" (1960)	"Sogni D'oro (Golden Dreams)" (1960)

Visualizer video
- "Ain't That a Kick in the Head" on YouTube

"Ain't That a Kick in the Head" is a swing song written in 1960 with music by Jimmy Van Heusen and lyrics by Sammy Cahn. It was first recorded on May 10 of that year by Dean Martin in a swinging big band jazz arrangement conducted by Nelson Riddle. The song was featured in the 1960 heist film Ocean's 11, where Martin performed it in an alternate arrangement featuring vibraphonist Red Norvo and his quartet.

The song was covered in 2004 by Irish boy band Westlife on their sixth studio album, ...Allow Us to Be Frank. Despite not charting in Ireland and failing to appear on the UK Singles Chart, their cover of the song reached No. 4 on the UK Download Chart, peaked at No. 5 in Denmark, and charted within the top 50 in Flanders, the Netherlands, and Sweden.

== Background ==
Van Heusen and Cahn wrote the song specifically for the 1960 film Ocean's 11, though it was initially referred to press as "Ain't That a Kick in the Seat". Dean Martin's single was released before the film's premiere on August 10, 1960. In the film, Martin performs the song inside a Las Vegas casino.

== Reception ==
Despite being listed on the "Very Strong Sales Potential" list in Billboard's "Reviews of This Week's Singles", Dean Martin's initial release of "Ain't That a Kick in the Head" failed to chart and never technically was a hit in terms of sales or radio play.

The song languished in obscurity and remained unreleased on LP or CD for many years after its initial single release. However, in 1989, producer Ron Furmanek was assembling material for a new Dean Martin compilation album in the Capitol Collectors Series and decided to include the tune. Furmanek located the three-track stereo session master tape and remixed the song in true stereo for the first time. The album sold well, eventually achieving Gold status, and the song has become strongly associated with Martin, in part due to Ocean's 11.

The Furmanek mix has been released on a number of subsequent Dean Martin greatest hits albums, such as Dino: The Essential Dean Martin and Capitol's and EMI's separate yet identically-titled Martin Greatest Hits releases, as well as many swing and easy listening genre compilations.

== In popular culture ==
Aside from the performance in Ocean's 11, the song has been used in a variety of popular media since its release. The song is heard in the 1990 feature film Goodfellas, as well as the 1993 feature film A Bronx Tale. It is featured in the 2010 video game Fallout: New Vegas, where it is played on the in-game radio station Radio New Vegas. It was also featured in the 2011 film Mission: Impossible – Ghost Protocol during the film's prison break sequence. It was used again in the trailer for the 2025 film Mickey 17.

== Certifications ==
Region	Certification	Certified units/sales
United States (RIAA)	Platinum	1,000,000^{‡}
^{‡} Sales+streaming figures based on certification alone.

== Westlife version ==
"Ain't That a Kick in the Head"

Single by Westlife

from the album ...Allow Us to Be Frank
- B-side: "Moon River"
- Released: November 1, 2004
- Length: 2:25
- Label: RCA; BMG; S
- Composer: Jimmy Van Heusen
- Lyricist: Sammy Cahn
- Producer: Steve Mac

Westlife singles chronology
"Obvious" (2004)	"Ain't That a Kick in the Head" (2004)	"Smile" (2004)

Music video
- "Ain't That a Kick in the Head" on YouTube

=== Charts ===
Chart (2004–2005)	Peak position
Belgium (Ultratop 50 Flanders)	47
Denmark (Tracklisten)	5
Netherlands (Single Top 100)	41
Romania (Romanian Top 100)	74
Sweden (Sverigetopplistan)	20
UK Singles Downloads (Official Charts)	4

=== Release history ===
Region	Date	Format(s)	Label(s)	Ref.
Denmark	November 1, 2004	CD	RCA; BMG; S	
Sweden	November 3, 2004	CD	RCA; BMG; S	
