= The Hungry Years (Willie Nelson album) =

Studio album by Willie Nelson
- Released: 1991
- Recorded: 1976
- Genre: Country

Willie Nelson chronology
Any Old Arms Won't Do (1992)	The Hungry Years (1991)	The IRS Tapes: Who'll Buy My Memories? (1992)

The Hungry Years is an album of archive recordings by Willie Nelson released along with the original IRS-forced direct sales release of Who'll Buy My Memories in November 1991. The recordings were made in Bogalusa, Louisiana in 1976.
