= Seashores of Old Mexico =

Studio album by Merle Haggard and Willie Nelson
- Released: October 13, 1987
- Studio: Pedernales Recording (Spicewood, Texas)
- Genre: Country
- Length: 38:29
- Label: Epic
- Producer: Merle Haggard, Willie Nelson

Willie Nelson chronology
Island in the Sea (1987)	Seashores of Old Mexico (1987)	What a Wonderful World (1988)

Merle Haggard chronology
Out Among the Stars (1986)	Seashores of Old Mexico (1987)	Chill Factor (1987)

Singles from Seashores of Old Mexico
- 1. "If I Could Only Fly" Released: August 1987

Seashores of Old Mexico is a studio album by Merle Haggard and Willie Nelson. It is a sequel to their enormously successful 1983 duet album Pancho and Lefty and was released in 1987. They are backed by the Strangers. The only charting single was a cover of a 1979 Blaze Foley song, "If I Could Only Fly", which peaked at number 58 on the 1987 Billboard Hot Country Songs singles chart.

== Critical reception ==
Martin Monkman of AllMusic believes the album pales in comparison to its predecessor, writing, "Alas, little of what made the earlier album so great is in evidence. At times the album sounds like a Merle Haggard record with Willie Nelson on hand as support." In his 2013 book The Running Kind, Haggard biographer David Cantwell is especially critical of Haggard's singing on "Yesterday": "His rich baritone, in especially fine form on Seashores' every other track, feels like it's been unexpectedly pumped with air and left out overnight in the chill and damp. His phrases, which normally snap off crisply or, more often, fade slowly like a sunset, here merely crumple."

== Track listing ==
1. "Seashores of Old Mexico" (Merle Haggard)3:36
2. "Without You on My Side" (Haggard)3:06
3. "When Times Were Good" (David Lynn Jones)6:40
4. "Jimmy the Broom" (Haggard, Freddy Powers)3:35
5. "Yesterday" (John Lennon, Paul McCartney)3:26
6. "If I Could Only Fly" (Blaze Foley)5:14
7. "Shotgun and a Pistol" (Haggard)3:05
8. "Love Makes a Fool of Us All" (Glenn Martin, Hank Cochran)3:30
9. "Why Do I Have to Choose" (Willie Nelson)3:54
10. "Silver Wings" (Haggard)3:43

== Personnel ==
- Merle Haggard– vocals, guitar, fiddle
- Willie Nelson – vocals, guitar

The Strangers:

- Roy Nichols – guitar
- Norm Hamlet – steel guitar
- Clint Strong – guitar
- Mark Yeary – piano
- Dennis Hromek – bass
- Biff Adams – drums
- Jimmy Belken – fiddle
- Gary Church – trumpet
- Don Markham – saxophone

with:

- Johnny Gimble – fiddle

and:

- Spencer Starnes – bass
- Dean Reynolds – upright bass
- Donna Faye – backing vocals
