= Sweet Memories (song) =

1968 single by Andy Williams

- Durch release picture sleeve

Single by Andy Williams

from the album Raindrops Keep Fallin' on My Head
- B-side: "You Are Where Everything Is"
- Released: June 1968
- Genre: Vocal
- Length: 2:30
- Label: Columbia 44527
- Songwriter: Mickey Newbury
- Producer: Nick DeCaro

Andy Williams singles chronology
"Can't Take My Eyes Off You" (1968)	"Sweet Memories" (1968)	"Battle Hymn of the Republic" (1968)

"Sweet Memories" is a song by Mickey Newbury, brought to success by Andy Williams. The song reached number 4 on the adult contemporary chart and number 75 on the Billboard chart in 1968.

Willie Nelson recorded the most popular cover version.

== Willie Nelson version ==
"Sweet Memories"

Single by Willie Nelson

from the album Sweet Memories
- A-side: "Little Things"
- Released: January 1979
- Genre: Country
- Length: 3:12
- Label: RCA Victor
- Songwriter: Mickey Newbury

Willie Nelson singles chronology
"Whiskey River" (1979)	"Sweet Memories" (1979)	"September Song" (1979)

Willie Nelson released a version of the song in January 1979 and was the second single from his album Sweet Memories. The song peaked at number 4 on the Billboard Hot Country Singles chart. It also reached number 1 on the RPM Country Tracks chart in Canada.

=== Chart performance ===
Chart (1979)	Peak position
U.S. Billboard Hot Country Singles	4
Canadian RPM Country Tracks	1
