= Nothing I Can Do About It Now =

- Cassette single cover art

Single by Willie Nelson

from the album A Horse Called Music
- B-side: "If I Were a Painting"
- Released: April 1989
- Genre: Country
- Length: 3:17
- Label: Columbia
- Songwriter: Beth Nielsen Chapman
- Producer: Fred Foster

Willie Nelson singles chronology
| "Twilight Time" (1988) | "Nothing I Can Do About It Now" (1989) | "There You Are" (1989) |

"Nothing I Can Do About It Now" is a song written by Beth Nielsen Chapman, and recorded by American country music artist Willie Nelson. It was released in April 1989 as the first single from the album A Horse Called Music. It was Nelson's fourteenth number one single on the U.S. Country Singles chart. The single spent one week at number one and a total of fifteen weeks on the chart.

== Chart performance ==
| Chart (1989) | Peak position |
|---|---|
| Canada Country Singles (RPM) | 1 |
| US Hot Country Songs (Billboard) | 1 |

=== Year-end charts ===
| Chart (1989) | Position |
|---|---|
| Canada Country Tracks (RPM) | 18 |
| US Country Songs (Billboard) | 10 |
