= Any Old Arms Won't Do =

Compilation album by Willie Nelson
- Released: October 6, 1992
- Genre: Country
- Label: Sound Solutions

Willie Nelson chronology
Born for Trouble (1990)	Any Old Arms Won't Do (1992)	The IRS Tapes: Who'll Buy My Memories? (1992)

Any Old Arms Won't Do is a compilation album by country singer Willie Nelson released by Trace Trading in the Netherlands in 1992.

== Track listing ==
1. "I Let My Mind Wander"
2. "December Days"
3. "I Can't Find the Time"
4. "I Don't Sleep a Wink"
5. "You Wouldn't Cross the Street to Say Goodbye"
6. "Suffering in Silence"
7. "I Feel Sorry for Him"
8. "You'll Always Have Someone"
9. "I Just Don't Understand"
10. "Shelter of My Arms"
11. "Any Old Arms Won't Do" (Hank Cochran, Willie Nelson)
12. "Slow Down Old World"
13. "Healing Hands of Time"
14. "And So Will You My Love"
15. "Things to Remember"
16. "One Step Beyond"
17. "Undo the Wrong"
18. "Home Is Where You're Happy"
19. "Why Are You Picking on Me?"
20. "Blame It on the Time"
