= Ain't Necessarily So =

- Cassette single cover art

Single by Willie Nelson

from the album Born for Trouble
- B-side: "I Never Cried for You"
- Released: September 1990
- Genre: Country
- Length: 3:07
- Label: Columbia
- Songwriter: Beth Nielsen Chapman
- Producer: Fred Foster

Willie Nelson singles chronology
"Highway" (1990)	"Ain't Necessarily So" (1990)	"The Piper Came Today" (1991)

"Ain't Necessarily So" is a song written by Beth Nielsen Chapman, and recorded by American country music artist Willie Nelson. It was released in September 1990 as the first single from his album Born for Trouble. The song reached number 17 on the Billboard Hot Country Singles & Tracks chart.

== Chart performance ==
Chart (1990)	Peak position
Canada Country Singles (RPM)	29
US Hot Country Songs (Billboard)	17
