= Too Dumb for New York City, Too Ugly for L.A. =

Studio album by Waylon Jennings
- Released: August 1992
- Genres: Country; outlaw country
- Length: 31:58
- Label: Epic
- Producer: Richie Albright

Waylon Jennings chronology
Clean Shirt (1991)	Too Dumb for New York City, Too Ugly for L.A. (1992)	Ol' Waylon Sings Ol' Hank (1992)

Professional ratings
Review scores
Source	Rating
AllMusic	3/5 stars

Too Dumb for New York City, Too Ugly for L.A. is the thirty-ninth studio album by American country music artist Waylon Jennings, released on Epic Records in 1992.

== Background ==
Jennings reunited with producer and ex-Waylors drummer Richie Albright for the album, which was an attempt "to find the key to the sound we had created together in the seventies." According to Jennings, their efforts were thwarted by Doug Johnson, the new head of A&R at Epic, who began phoning the studio and suggesting changes:

He told me how much he loved my work, and I was one of his inspirations...The album was beautiful, he kept assuring me, only he wanted us to keep cutting sides. Change a verse and a chorus. Remix and remaster. I said, that's bordering on fucking with me. By the time Too Dumb came out, in 1992, we were both pissed off. Epic sat on the record, big-time.

It was Jennings' third and final album on the label – the previous two being The Eagle (1990) and Clean Shirt (1991), a split album with Willie Nelson – and marked the end of his days of being signed to a major imprint. "Just Talkin'" and the title track were released as singles, but failed to chart; the record itself was a commercial disappointment as well, reaching #70 on the country charts. The short liner notes, expressing thanks to several individuals, were written by the singer himself. The final straw for Jennings at Epic came when they asked him to call up radio stations and influence them to play his record: "I thought, boy, there was a time when I wouldn't do this. Then I thought again. What did I mean, there was a time? I ain't doing it now."

== Track listing ==
1. "Just Talkin'" (Jennings) – 3:26
2. "Silent Partners" (Bobby Braddock) – 2:51
3. "Didn't We Shine" (Don Schlitz, Jesse Winchester) – 3:44
4. "Too Dumb for New York City" (Jennings, Basil McDavid) – 2:57
5. "Armed and Dangerous" (Troy Seals, Tony Colton) – 2:48
6. "Heartaches Older Than You" (Seals, Jennings, Max D. Barnes) – 3:20
7. "Hank Williams Syndrome" (Jennings) – 3:29
8. "A Lot of Good" (Seals, Jennings, Buddy Emmons) – 3:26
9. "I've Got My Faults" (Jennings) – 3:05
10. "Smokey on Your Front Door" (Seals, Jennings, Barnes) – 2:52

== Personnel ==
- Richie Albright - percussion
- Marcia Beverly - background vocals
- Jerry Bridges - bass
- Jimmy Capps - guitar, mandolin
- Bobby Emmons - keyboards
- Jeff Hale - drums
- Jenni Jennings - background vocals
- Brent Rowan - guitar
- Troy Seals - guitar
- Robby Turner - mandolin, steel guitar, resonator guitar, bass
- Barry Walsh - keyboards
- Reggie Young - guitar
- Waylon Jennings - guitar, vocals, mandolin

== Chart performance ==
Chart (1992)	Peak position
U.S. Billboard Top Country Albums	70
