= There You Are (Willie Nelson song) =

Single by Willie Nelson

from the album A Horse Called Music
- B-side: "Spirit"
- Released: September 1989
- Genre: Country
- Length: 3:04
- Label: Columbia
- Songwriters: Kye Fleming; Mike Reid
- Producer: Willie Nelson

Willie Nelson singles chronology
"Nothing I Can Do About It Now" (1989)	"There You Are" (1989)	"Highway" (1990)

"There You Are" is a song written by Mike Reid and Kye Fleming, and recorded by American country music artist Willie Nelson. It was released in September 1989 as the second single from his album A Horse Called Music, and his last release in the 1980s. The song peaked at number 8 on the Billboard Hot Country Singles chart.

== Chart performance ==
Chart (1989–1990)	Peak position
Canada Country Singles (RPM)	4
US Hot Country Songs (Billboard)	8

=== Year-end charts ===
Chart (1990)	Position
Canada Country Tracks (RPM)	60
