= Live at Billy Bob's Texas (Willie Nelson album) =

Live album by Willie Nelson
- Released: May 4, 2004
- Recorded: October 11, 2003
- Venue: Billy Bob's
- Genre: Country
- Length: 53:28
- Label: Smith Music Group
- Producer: Rick Smith

Willie Nelson chronology
Live and Kickin' (2003)	Live at Billy Bob's Texas (2004)	Outlaws and Angels (2004)

Live at Billy Bob's Texas is a 2004 album by country singer Willie Nelson. It was recorded at Billy Bob's, a popular country music nightclub in Fort Worth, Texas, United States.

== Content ==
On October 11, 2003, Nelson performed at Billy Bob's in Fort Worth, Texas. The concert was recorded and later released by the Smith Music Group label as their 25th Live at Billy Bob's album. The label first published a 20-track CD, and later an extended 28-track DVD version of Nelson's appearance. The DVD also included interviews with the band and behind-the-scenes footage.

The album reached number 27 on Billboard's Top Country Albums, number 12 on the Independent Albums chart, and it appeared on the Billboard 200. The Fort Worth Star-Telegram defined the album as "vintage Willie". The review remarked the strength of Nelson's voice, and the tendency of the singer to resort to the improvisation of the music and the lyrics of his songs. Reviewer Stefan Stevenson felt that Nelson "takes too many liberties", but that his guitar playing "never gets much ink" except on his performances of "Blue Skies" and "Under the Double Eagle". The Salt Lake Tribune graded the album with an "A". Meanwhile, AllMusic criticized the release as "substandard" and "poorly recorded", as critic Thom Jurek deplored Nelson's performance as "uninspired and cynical", while he felt that the volume of the lead guitar "dwarfed" the rest of the band.

== Track listing ==
No.	Title	Length
1.	"Whiskey River"	2:18
2.	"Stay All Night (Stay a Little Longer)"	2:41
3.	"Good Hearted Woman"	3:33
4.	"Funny How Time Slips Away"	3:08
5.	"Crazy"	1:34
6.	"Night Life"	3:38
7.	"Down Yonder"	1:57
8.	"Workin' Man Blues"	3:25
9.	"Help Me Make It Through the Night"	3:22
10.	"Me & Bobby McGee"	3:18
11.	"Me & Paul"	2:49
12.	"If You've Got the Money I've Got the Time"	2:02
13.	"Blue Eyes Crying in the Rain"	2:57
14.	"Under the Double Eagle"	3:10
15.	"Blue Skies"	3:12
16.	"Georgia on My Mind"	3:13
17.	"All of Me"	2:04
18.	"Mammas Don't Let Your Babies Grow Up to Be Cowboys"	2:37
19.	"Angel Flying Too Close to the Ground"	3:34
20.	"On the Road Again"	2:14

== Personnel ==
- Willie Nelson – Guitar, vocals

== Chart performance ==
Sales chart performance of Willie Nelson Live at Billy Bob's
Chart (2004)	Peak position
US Top Country Albums (Billboard)	27
US Billboard 200	168
US Independent Albums (Billboard)	12
