= The Minstrel Man =

Compilation album by Willie Nelson
- Released: 1981
- Genre: Country
- Label: RCA Records

Willie Nelson chronology
Greatest Hits (& Some That Will Be) (1981)	The Minstrel Man (1981)	Everybody's Talkin' (1981)

The Minstrel Man is a 1981 compilation album by country singer Willie Nelson.

== Track listing ==
1. "Good Times"
2. "Will You Remember Me"
3. "Laying My Burdens Down"
4. "Mountain Dew"
5. "It Should Be Easier Now"
6. "Minstrel Man"
7. "Senses"
8. "You Left Me a Long Long Time Ago"
9. "Where Do You Stand"
10. "Blackjack County Chain"

== Personnel ==
- Willie Nelson – Guitar, vocals
