= Clean Shirt =

Studio album by Waylon Jennings and Willie Nelson
- Released: June 1991
- Genres: Country; outlaw country
- Length: 29:35
- Label: Epic
- Producer: Bob Montgomery

Waylon Jennings & Willie Nelson chronology
Take It to the Limit (1983)	Clean Shirt (1991)

Waylon Jennings chronology
The Eagle (1990)	Clean Shirt (1991)	Too Dumb for New York City, Too Ugly for L.A. (1992)

Willie Nelson chronology
The IRS Tapes: Who'll Buy My Memories? (1991)	Clean Shirt (1991)	Across the Borderline (1993)

Professional ratings
Review scores
Source	Rating
Allmusic	link

Clean Shirt is the fourth and final collaborative studio album by Waylon Jennings and Willie Nelson. The album was released on Epic Records in June 1991.

== Background ==
Jennings, who had just moved to Epic from MCA, expressed his frustration at producer Bob Montgomery, who seemed far more excited at the prospect of a collaboration between Jennings and Nelson than a new Jennings solo album:

He was really hot to team me up with Willie. "I want Willie involved in this," he said almost the first day we were in the studio." "Oh no you don't," I told him. "Not in Nashville. Willie don't give a shit about this. He'll bring some songs he likes to do, but he's not into that other stuff. He couldn't care less about the arrangements. Think of him as Sinatra. He likes to come in and sing and leave." He kept on about Willie...Bob eventually got his way...

The two singers' last collaboration, after Waylon and Willie (1978), WWII (1982) and Take It to the Limit (1983), it was released at a time which coincided with both artists' commercial decline. All but the final two songs were written partly by Troy Seals. Clean Shirt was the duo's least successful album, peaking at #28 on the country charts and barely making the Billboard 200 at #193; "If I Can Find a Clean Shirt" was the only charting single, reaching #51. According to Jennings, Epic executives were displeased about the prevalence of Mexican horns on the songs.

== Reception ==
Brian Mansfiel of AllMusic writes, "Small flashes of tossed-off brilliance appear in nearly every song, but sometimes it's hard to tell what's part of the pair's casual charm and what's just laziness: when the clever "Old Age and Treachery" (always overcome youth and skill) falls apart at the end, it's infuriating. Like much of either singer's output, Clean Shirt sounds a bit wrinkled at first, but most of the album holds up to repeated listening."

== Track listing ==
1. "If I Can Find a Clean Shirt" (Jennings, Troy Seals) – 3:25
2. "I Could Write a Book About You" (Jennings, Seals, Nelson, Max D. Barnes) – 2:45
3. "Old Age and Treachery" (Jennings, Seals, Nelson, Barnes) – 3:35
4. "Two Old Sidewinders" (Hank Cochran, Barnes, Vern Gosdin) – 2:48
5. "Tryin' to Outrun the Wind" (Seals, Eddie Setser, Tom Davey) – 3:27
6. "Good Ol' Nights" (Jennings, Seals, Barnes) – 2:20
7. "Guitars That Won't Stay in Tune" (Seals, Setser) – 1:55
8. "The Makin's of a Song" (Jennings, Seals, Barnes, Nelson) – 2:50
9. "Put Me on a Train Back to Texas" (Jim Hurt, Billy Nelson, Roy Clayborne) – 2:50
10. "Rocks from Rolling Stones" (Tony Colton, Eddy Shaver) – 3:40

== Personnel ==
- Gene Chrisman – drums
- Bobby Emmons – keyboards
- Paul Franklin – steel guitar, pedabro
- Mike Haynes – trumpet
- Waylon Jennings – lead vocals, background vocals, acoustic guitar, electric guitar
- Mike Leech – bass guitar
- Chris McDonald – trombone
- Terry McMillan – timbales
- Brent Mason – electric guitar
- Tim Mensy – acoustic guitar
- Kenny Mims – electric guitar
- Willie Nelson – lead vocals, background vocals, acoustic guitar
- Mickey Raphael – harmonica
- Bobby Wood – keyboards
- Reggie Young – electric guitar

== Chart performance ==
Chart (1991)	Peak position
U.S. Billboard Top Country Albums	28
U.S. Billboard 200	193
