= Yours Always =

Compilation album by Willie Nelson
- Released: 1991
- Genre: Country
- Length: 32:51
- Label: Medacy

Willie Nelson chronology
Love Songs (1986)	Yours Always (1991)	Super Hits (1994)

Professional ratings
Review scores
Source	Rating
Allmusic	2.5/5 stars

Yours Always is a 1991 compilation album by country singer Willie Nelson.

== Track listing ==
1. "Always on My Mind" (Johnny Christopher, Mark James, Wayne Carson Thompson)- 3:31
2. "I Never Go Around Mirrors (I've Got a Heartache to Hide)" (Lefty Frizzell, Sanger D. Schafer) - 2:33
3. "Why Are You Picking on Me?" (Willie Nelson) - 2:27
4. "Help Me Make It Through the Night" (Fred Foster, Kris Kristofferson) - 3:58
5. "Angel Flying Too Close to the Ground" (Willie Nelson) - 4:24
6. "Mona Lisa" (Ray Evans, Jay Livingston) - 2:31
7. "I'm Not Trying to Forget You" (Willie Nelson) - 3:18
8. "If You've Got the Money (I've Got the Time)" (Jim Beck, Lefty Frizzell) - 2:03
9. "It's Not Supposed to Be That Way" (Willie Nelson) - 3:20
10. "City of New Orleans" (Steve Goodman) - 4:49

== Personnel ==
- Willie Nelson – Guitar, vocals
