= Songs for Tsunami Relief: Austin to South Asia =

Live album by Willie Nelson
- Released: 2005
- Genre: Country
- Label: Lost Highway

Willie Nelson chronology
Outlaws and Angels (2004)	Songs for Tsunami Relief: Austin to South Asia (2005)	Here We Go Again (2011)

Songs for Tsunami Relief: Austin to South Asia is an album by American country and western musician Willie Nelson. It was released on April 12, 2005, by the Lost Highway label. The album was recorded live in Austin, Texas, and made for the people of the 2004 tsunami.

== Track listing ==
1. Love Be Heard
2. Mary
3. Farther Along/All Just to Get to You
4. Boxcars
5. Everybody Loves Me
6. Break This Time
7. My Mathematical Mind
8. Everything Hits at Once
9. What I Deserve
10. Travelin' Soldier
11. What Would Willie Do?
12. Living in the Promiseland
13. Whiskey River
14. Still Is Still Moving to Me
15. Blue Eyes Crying in the Rain
16. The Great Divide
17. Mamas Don't Let Your Babies Grow Up to Be Cowboys
18. Angel Flying Too Close to the Ground

== Chart performance ==
Chart (2005)	Peak position
U.S. Billboard Top Country Albums	57
