= Half Nelson (album) =

Compilation album by Willie Nelson
- Released: 1985
- Genre: Country
- Length: 35:44
- Label: Columbia
- Producer: Barry Beckett, Willie Nelson, Neil Young, Merle Haggard, David Briggs, Ben Keith, Elliot Mazer, Chips Moman, Bill Ivey, Marshall Morgan, Richard Perry, Leon Russell, Harold Shedd, Billy Sherrill, Jerry Wexler, Paul Worley.

Willie Nelson chronology
| Collectors Series (1985) | Half Nelson (1985) | Love Songs (1986) |

Professional ratings
Review scores
| Source | Rating |
|---|---|
| Allmusic | link |

Half Nelson is a compilation album of duets performed by country singer Willie Nelson along with various other artists, released in 1985. It also includes a few never-before released hits as well.

== Track listing ==
| No. | Title | Writer(s) | Duet partner | Length |
|---|---|---|---|---|
| 1. | "Pancho and Lefty" | Townes Van Zandt | Merle Haggard | 4:49 |
| 2. | "Slow Movin' Outlaw" | Dee Moeller | Lacy J. Dalton | 3:38 |
| 3. | "Are There Any More Real Cowboys?" | Neil Young | Neil Young | 3:06 |
| 4. | "I Told a Lie to My Heart" | Hank Williams | Hank Williams | 2:51 |
| 5. | "Texas on a Saturday Night" | Mundo Earwood | Mel Tillis | 2:42 |
| 6. | "Seven Spanish Angels" | Troy Seals, Eddie Setser | Ray Charles | 3:49 |
| 7. | "To All the Girls I've Loved Before" | Hal David, Albert Hammond | Julio Iglesias | 3:37 |
| 8. | "They All Went To Mexico" | Greg Brown | Carlos Santana | 4:51 |
| 9. | "Honky Tonk Women" | Mick Jagger, Keith Richards | Leon Russell | 3:39 |
| 10. | "Half a Man" | Willie Nelson | George Jones | 3:06 |

== Personnel ==
- Willie Nelson – Guitar, vocals
- Ray Charles – Piano, vocals
- Carlos Santana – Guitar
- Julio Iglesias – Vocals
- Lacy J. Dalton – Guitar, vocals
- Merle Haggard – Guitar, vocals
- George Jones – Guitar, vocals
- Mel Tillis – Guitar, vocals
- Hank Williams – Guitar, vocals
- Neil Young – Guitar, Harmonica, Vocals
- Leon Russell – Piano, vocals

== Charts ==
=== Weekly charts ===
| Chart (1986) | Peak position |
|---|---|
| US Top Country Albums (Billboard) | 10 |

=== Year-end charts ===
| Chart (1986) | Position |
|---|---|
| US Top Country Albums (Billboard) | 35 |
