= All the Songs I've Loved Before: 40 Unforgettable Songs =

Compilation album by Willie Nelson
- Released: 2001
- Genres: Country, Folk, Rock music
- Label: Columbia

Willie Nelson chronology
Good Ol' Country Singin' (2000)	All the Songs I've Loved Before: 40 Unforgettable Songs (2001)	Crazy: The Demo Sessions (2003)

All the Songs I've Loved Before: 40 Unforgettable Songs is a compilation album by country singer Willie Nelson, released in 2001. This album was successful in Sweden, New Zealand and Australia - in each country it has sold about 30 000 copies, so it has sold nearly 150.000 worldwide.

== Track listing ==
=== Disk 1 ===
1. "All of Me"
2. "Don't Get Around Much Anymore"
3. "On the Sunny Side of the Street"
4. "Twilight Time"
5. "Georgia on My Mind"
6. "Someone to Watch Over Me"
7. "Always on My Mind"
8. "Crazy"
9. "Unchained Melody"
10. "Moon River"
11. "Some Enchanted Evening"
12. "Stardust"
13. "That Lucky Old Sun"
14. "Blue Skies"
15. "Moonlight in Vermont"
16. "Always"
17. "Ole Buttermilk Sky"
18. "Blue Eyes Crying in the Rain"
19. "What a Wonderful World"
20. "To All the Girls I've Loved Before"

=== Disk 2 ===
1. "Mona Lisa"
2. "Turn Me Loose and Let Me Swing"
3. "Once You're Past the Blues"
4. "Please Don't Talk About Me When I'm Gone"
5. "Faraway Places"
6. "Song From Moulin Rouge (Where Is Your Heart)"
7. "Danny Boy"
8. "Because of You"
9. "Tenderly"
10. "To Each His Own"
11. "Valentine"
12. "Let It Be Me"
13. "Over the Rainbow"
14. "Ac-Cent-Tchu-Ate the Positive"
15. "Bridge over Troubled Water"
16. "Help Me Make It Through the Night"
17. "Spanish Eyes"
18. "I Can See Clearly Now"
19. "City of New Orleans"
20. "One For My Baby and One More For the Road"

== Personnel ==
- Willie Nelson – guitar, vocals

== Charts ==
=== Weekly charts ===
Chart (2002)	Peak position
Australian Albums (ARIA)	8
Finnish Albums (Suomen virallinen lista)	31
New Zealand Albums (RMNZ)	4
Norwegian Albums (VG-lista)	15
Swedish Albums (Sverigetopplistan)	4

=== Year-end charts ===
Chart (2002)	Position
Swedish Albums (Sverigetopplistan)	75

== Certifications ==
Region	Certification	Certified units/sales
Australia (ARIA)	Gold	35,000^{^}
New Zealand (RMNZ)	Gold	7,500^{^}
Sweden (GLF)	Gold	40,000^{^}
^{^} Shipments figures based on certification alone.
