= Partners (Willie Nelson album) =

Studio album by Willie Nelson
- Released: 1986
- Recorded: Pedernales (Spicewood, Texas); Moman's (Nashville, Tennessee)
- Genre: Country
- Length: 35:11
- Label: Columbia
- Producer: Chips Moman

Willie Nelson chronology
| The Promiseland (1986) | Partners (1986) | Island in the Sea (1987) |

Partners is a studio album by the American musician Willie Nelson, released in 1986. Johnny Gimble played fiddle on the album.

== Critical reception ==
Professional ratings
Review scores
| Source | Rating |
|---|---|
| AllMusic | 3/5 stars |
| Orlando Sentinel | 2/5 stars |
| The Philadelphia Inquirer | 2/4 stars |
| The Rolling Stone Album Guide | 2/5 stars |

The Orlando Sentinel wrote: "Nelson's off-hand vocal phrasing is one part of his distinctive talent. But on most of these tracks, that delivery sounds merely disinterested." The Ottawa Citizen concluded that "the laid-back tone of his recent albums gives way to a practically comatose feel." The Philadelphia Inquirer praised the "slow, lovely, almost frighteningly heartfelt version of 'When I Dream'."

== Track listing ==
1. "Partners After All" (Bobby Emmons, Chips Moman)
2. "When I Dream" (Sandy Mason Theoret)
3. "Hello Love, Goodbye" (Johnny Rodriguez)
4. "Heart of Gold" (Neil Young)
5. "Kathleen" (Willie Nelson)
6. "Something" (George Harrison)
7. "So Much Like My Dad" (Emmons, Moman)
8. "My Own Peculiar Way" (Nelson)
9. "Remember Me" (Stuart Hamblen)
10. "Home Away from Home" (Emmons)

== Personnel ==
- Willie Nelson – guitar, vocals
- Chips Moman – guitar
- J.R. Cobb – guitar, backing vocals
- Reggie Young – guitar
- Mike Leech – bass guitar, mandolin, arrangements
- Bobby Emmons – keyboards
- Bobby Wood – keyboards, backing vocals
- Gene Chrisman – drums
- Johnny Gimble – fiddle
- Mickey Raphael – harmonica
- The "A" Strings – strings
- David Mayo, Paul Davis, Rebecca Evans Russell, Rick Yancey, Sam Shoup, Stephony Smith, Toni Wine – backing vocals

== Chart performance ==
| Chart (1986) | Peak position |
|---|---|
| U.S. Billboard Top Country Albums | 13 |
