= Love Songs (Willie Nelson album) =

Compilation album by Willie Nelson
- Released: 1986
- Genre: Country
- Label: Columbia

Willie Nelson chronology
Half Nelson (1985)	Love Songs (1986)	Yours Always (1991)

Love Songs is a compilation album by Willie Nelson, featuring his covers of ten classics, including "Some Enchanted Evening" and "Always On My Mind".

== Track listing ==
1. To All the Girls I've Loved Before (with Julio Iglesias)
2. Blue Skies
3. Let It Be Me
4. Tenderly
5. Harbor Lights
6. Mona Lisa
7. To Each His Own
8. Over the Rainbow
9. Seven Spanish Angels (with Ray Charles)
10. Georgia on My Mind
11. Bridge over Troubled Water
12. Without a Song
13. Unchained Melody
14. That Lucky Old Sun
15. In My Mother's Eyes
16. Always on My Mind
