= What a Wonderful World (Willie Nelson album) =

Studio album by Willie Nelson
- Released: March 1988
- Genre: Country
- Length: 30:03
- Label: Columbia
- Producer: Chips Moman

Willie Nelson chronology
| Seashores of Old Mexico (1987) | What a Wonderful World (1988) | A Horse Called Music (1989) |

What a Wonderful World is the 36th studio album by country singer Willie Nelson released in March 1988.

Professional ratings
Review scores
| Source | Rating |
|---|---|
| Allmusic | link |

== Track listing ==
1. "Spanish Eyes" (Bert Kaempfert, Jerry Leiber, Charlie Singleton, Eddie Snyder, Phil Spector) - 3:33
  - duet with Julio Iglesias
2. "Moon River" (Henry Mancini, Johnny Mercer)- 3:10
3. "Some Enchanted Evening" (Oscar Hammerstein II, Richard Rodgers) - 3:40
4. "What a Wonderful World" (George Douglas/Bob Thiele, George David Weiss)- 2:14
5. "South of the Border" (Michael Carr, Jimmy Kennedy) - 3:17
6. "Ole Buttermilk Sky" (Jack Brooks, Hoagy Carmichael) - 2:48
7. "The Song from Moulin Rouge (Where Is Your Heart?)" (Georges Auric, William Engvick) - 2:53
8. "To Each His Own" (Ray Evans, Jay Livingston) - 3:37
9. "Twilight Time" (Alan Dunn. Artie Dunn, Al Nevins. Morton Nevins, Buck Ram) - 2:50
10. "Ac-Cent-Tchu-Ate the Positive" (Harold Arlen, Johnny Mercer) - 2:01

== Personnel ==
- Willie Nelson - guitar, vocals
- Julio Iglesias - vocals on "Spanish Eyes"
- Gene Chrisman - drums
- Johnny Christopher - guitar, vocals
- Bobby Emmons - keyboards
- Mike Leech - bass guitar
- Chips Moman - guitar, producer, engineer
- Monique Moman - vocals
- Mickey Raphael - harmonica
- Toni Wine - vocals
- Bobby Wood - keyboards, vocals
- Reggie Young - guitar

== Charts ==
=== Weekly charts ===
| Chart (1988) | Peak position |
|---|---|
| US Top Country Albums (Billboard) | 6 |

=== Year-end charts ===
| Chart (1989) | Position |
|---|---|
| US Top Country Albums (Billboard) | 25 |
