= Always (Willie Nelson album) =

Compilation album by Willie Nelson
- Released: 1980
- Genre: Country
- Label: RCA Records

Willie Nelson chronology
Sweet Memories (album) (1979)	Always (1980)	His Very Best (1980)

The compilation album, Always, by Willie Nelson was one of the best-selling albums of 1980 and 1981 in Australia and New Zealand. In Australia, it peaked at No. 4 and in New Zealand at No. 7.

== Track listing ==
1. Always
2. Danny Boy
3. On the Road Again
4. My Heroes Have Always Been Cowboys
5. Help Me Make It Through The Night
6. Far Away Places
7. Tenderly
8. Blue Eyes Crying In The Rain
9. That Lucky Old Sun
10. Red Headed Stranger
11. Because Of You
12. One For My Baby And One More For The Road

== Certifications ==
Region	Certification	Certified units/sales
Australia (ARIA)	Platinum	50,000^{^}
New Zealand (RMNZ)	Platinum	15,000^{^}
^{^} Shipments figures based on certification alone.
