= Sweet Memories (Willie Nelson album) =

Compilation album by Willie Nelson
- Released: 1979
- Genre: Country
- Length: 30:15
- Label: RCA Records

Willie Nelson chronology
Face of a Fighter (1978)	Sweet Memories (1979)	Always (1980)

Professional ratings
Review scores
Source	Rating
Allmusic	2/5 stars

Sweet Memories is an album by country artist Willie Nelson. It was released in 1979.

The album consisted of older songs produced with an added string section.

== Track listing ==
Songs written by Willie Nelson except where noted.

1. "Sweet Memories" (Mickey Newbury) – 3:12
2. "Everybody's Talkin'" (Fred Neil) – 3:23
3. "Wonderful Future" – 2:37
4. "December Day" – 2:16
5. "Help Me Make It Through the Night" (Kris Kristofferson) – 2:56
6. "Both Sides Now" (Joni Mitchell) – 2:59
7. "Wake Me When It's Over" – 3:46
8. "Little Things" (Willie Nelson, Shirley Nelson) – 3:17
9. "Buddy" – 2:15
10. "Will You Remember" – 3:34

== Charts ==
=== Weekly charts ===
Chart (1979)	Peak position
US Billboard 200	154
US Top Country Albums (Billboard)	6

=== Year-end charts ===
Chart (1979)	Position
US Top Country Albums (Billboard)	31
