= Live and Kickin' (Willie Nelson album) =

Live album by Willie Nelson & Friends
- Released: June 24, 2003
- Recorded: April 9, 2003
- Genre: Country
- Length: 57:48
- Label: Lost Highway
- Producer: James Stroud

Willie Nelson & Friends chronology
Willie Nelson & Friends – Stars & Guitars (2002)	Live and Kickin' (2003)	Live at Billy Bob's Texas (2004)

Live and Kickin' was a 2003 all-star concert by country singer Willie Nelson on April 9, 2003, featuring music stars of diverse genres like Eric Clapton, Shania Twain, Elvis Costello, Diana Krall, Norah Jones, Ray Charles and Steven Tyler. The concert was held at the Beacon Theatre in New York City in celebration of Willie Nelson's 70th Birthday (which occurred 20 days later). Announcers were Robert De Niro, Whoopi Goldberg and Bill Clinton. A large cake in the shape of Willie's iconic "Trigger" Martin guitar was wheeled onstage towards the end of the show.

Among the many notable moments of the concert was a poignant "A Song For You", performed by Willie, Leon Russell and Ray Charles. When Ray, in failing health, sang the line "And when my life is over, remember when were together, we were alone and I was singing this song for you", Willie is visibly emotional.

The concert was recorded and broadcast over two hours on U.S. television on May 26, 2003, as part of the USA Network's Memorial Day programming. A 55-minute CD with fifteen songs from the performance was released on June 24, 2003, and a DVD video with 25 songs followed on August 23, 2005.

== Track listing ==
1. "I Didn't Come Here (And I Ain't Leavin')" (Scotty Emerick, Michael Smotherman) - 3:12
2. "Night Life" (Walt Breeland, Paul Buskirk, Willie Nelson) - 4:32
  - duet with Eric Clapton
3. "Blue Eyes Crying in the Rain" (Fred Rose) - 2:55
  - duet with Shania Twain
4. "Homeward Bound" (Paul Simon) - 3:57
  - duet with Paul Simon
5. "Beer for My Horses" (Emerick, Toby Keith) - 3:33
  - duet with Toby Keith
6. "Crazy" (Nelson) - 4:35
  - duet with Diana Krall and Elvis Costello
7. "To All the Girls I've Loved Before" (Hal David, Albert Hammond) - 4:25
  - duet with Wyclef Jean
8. "The Wurlitzer Prize" (Bobby Emmons, Chips Moman) - 2:30
  - duet with Norah Jones
9. "She Loves My Automobile" (Frank Beard, Billy Gibbons, Dusty Hill) - 2:40
  - duet with ZZ Top
10. "Angel Flying Too Close to the Ground" (Nelson) - 4:37
  - duet with Shelby Lynne
11. "A Song for You" (Leon Russell) - 5:22
  - duet with Leon Russell and Ray Charles
12. "I Couldn't Believe It Was True" (Eddy Arnold, Wally Fowler) - 2:53
  - duet with John Mellencamp
13. "Last Thing I Needed First Thing This Morning" (Donna Farar, Gary P. Nunn) - 4:33
  - duet with Kenny Chesney
14. "Run That by Me One More Time" (Fred Foster, Arthur Hancock, Jimmy Lambert) - 2:34
  - duet with Ray Price
15. "One Time Too Many" (Richard Supa, Steven Tyler) - 5:30
  - duet with Steven Tyler

== Personnel ==
- Robert Aaron - Keyboards
- Kenny Aronoff - Drums
- Frank Beard- Drums on "She Loves My Automobile"
- Ray Charles - Piano and Vocals on "A Song For You"
- Kenny Chesney - Duet Vocals on "Last Thing I Needed First Thing This Morning"
- Cory Churko - Background vocals
- Eric Clapton - Duet Vocals on "Night Life"
- Dane Clark - Drums
- Elvis Costello - Vocals on "Crazy"
- Dan Dugmore - Steel Guitar
- Stuart Duncan - Fiddle
- Shannon Forrest - Percussion
- Billy Gibbons - Electric guitar and Lead Vocals on "She Loves My Automobile"
- Donald Guillaume - Drums
- Dusty Hill - Bass guitar and Background Vocals on "She Loves My Automobile"
- John Hobbs - Keyboards
- Wyclef Jean - Acoustic Guitar and Duet Vocals on "To All the Girls I've Loved Before"
- Norah Jones - Duet Vocals on "The Wurlitzer Prize"
- Toby Keith - Duet Vocals on "Beer for My Horses"
- Diana Krall - Vocals on "Crazy"
- Shelby Lynne - Duet Vocals on Angel Flying Too Close to the Ground"
- Brent Mason - Electric guitar
- John Mellencamp - Duet Vocals on "I Couldn't Believe It Was True"
- Willie Nelson - Acoustic Guitar, Lead Vocals
- Ray Price - Duet Vocals on "Run That by Me One More Time"
- Mickey Raphael - Harmonica
- Michael Rhodes - Bass guitar
- Matt Rollings - Keyboards
- Leon Russell - Vocals on "A Song For You", "I Can't Believe It Was True", and "Last Thing I Needed First Thing This Morning"
- Paul Simon - Duet Vocals on "Homeward Bound"
- Mirium Sturm - Violin
- Shania Twain - Duet Vocals on "Blue Eyes Crying in the Rain"
- Steven Tyler - Duet Vocals on "One Time Too Many"
- Julia Waters - Background Vocals
- Maxine Willard Waters - Background Vocals
- Biff Watson - Acoustic Guitar, Electric guitar
- Andy York - Electric guitar

== Charts ==
=== Weekly charts ===
Chart (2003)	Peak position
US Billboard 200	42
US Top Country Albums (Billboard)	4

=== Year-end charts ===
Chart (2003)	Position
US Top Country Albums (Billboard)	53
