= Workin' Man =

Studio album by Willie Nelson
- Released: November 7, 2025
- Studios: East Iris (Nashville); Blackbird (Nashville); Pedernales Recording (Spicewood, Texas)
- Genre: Country
- Length: 39:01
- Label: Legacy
- Producers: Willie Nelson; Mickey Raphael

Willie Nelson chronology
Oh What a Beautiful World (2025)	Workin' Man (2025)	Dream Chaser (2026)

Singles from Workin' Man
- 1. "Workin' Man Blues" Released: September 4, 2025

Workin' Man: Willie Sings Merle is the 78th solo studio album by American singer-songwriter Willie Nelson. It was released on November 7, 2025, through Legacy Recordings. Produced by Nelson and Mickey Raphael, the album contains eleven songs by Nelson's late frequent collaborator Merle Haggard.

== Background ==
Nelson had recorded four studio duet albums with Haggard, from the 1983 Pancho & Lefty (which yielded a #1 hit with the title track) to Haggard's final studio album Django and Jimmie in 2015. This album includes Nelson's last recordings with Bobbie Nelson and Paul English, both long-serving members of his Family Band.

== Critical reception ==
Professional ratings
Aggregate scores
Source	Rating
Metacritic	84/100
Review scores
Source	Rating
AllMusic	3.5/5 stars
Robert Christgau	A

Workin' Man received positive reviews from music critics. At Metacritic, which assigns a normalized rating out of 100 to reviews from mainstream critics, the album received a score of 84 out of 100 based on four reviews, indicating "universal acclaim".

Mark Deming at AllMusic praised the performances of Nelson and the band's "in the moment" approach to the performances (including studio chatter and ad-libs) but noted that Nelson chose to interpret Haggard's most familiar songs.

== Track listing ==
Workin' Man: Willie Sings Merle track listing
No.	Title	Writer(s)	Length
1.	"Workin' Man Blues"	Merle Haggard	5:15
2.	"Silver Wings"	Haggard	5:58
3.	"Tonight The Bottle Let Me Down"	Haggard	2:47
4.	"Today I Started Loving You Again"	Haggard; Bonnie Owens	3:24
5.	"Swinging Doors"	Haggard	2:52
6.	"Okie from Muskogee"	Haggard; Roy Edward Burris	2:49
7.	"Mama Tried"	Haggard	2:18
8.	"I Think I'll Just Stay Here and Drink"	Haggard	3:30
9.	"Somewhere Between"	Haggard	3:03
10.	"If We Make It Through December"	Haggard	3:30
11.	"Ramblin' Fever"	Haggard	3:35
Total length:			39:01

== Personnel ==
Credits adapted from Tidal.

- Willie Nelson – vocals, Trigger, production
- Mickey Raphael – production, harmonica
- Billy English – drums, percussion
- Paul English – drums, percussion
- Kevin Smith – electric bass guitar, upright bass
- Bobbie Nelson – piano
- Steve Chadie – engineering
- Brando Marius – additional engineering
- Charlie Kramsky – engineering assistance
- Tony Castle – mixing
- Andrew Mendelson – mastering
- Adam Battershell – mastering assistance
- Joey Salit – mastering assistance
- Luke Armentrout – mastering assistance
- Taylor Chadwick – mastering assistance

== Charts ==
Chart performance for Workin' Man
Chart (2025)	Peak position
Croatian International Albums (HDU)	14
Scottish Albums (Official Charts)	99
UK Americana Albums (Official Charts)	22
UK Country Albums (Official Charts)	1
US Top Album Sales (Billboard)	44
