= All of Me – Live in Concert =

Live album by Willie Nelson
- Released: October 15, 2002
- Genre: Country
- Length: 35:43
- Label: BCI Music

Willie Nelson chronology
Willie and Family Live (1978)	All of Me – Live in Concert (2002)	Willie Nelson & Friends – Stars & Guitars (2002)

All of Me – Live in Concert is a 2002 live album by American country singer Willie Nelson.

== Track listing ==
1. Help Me Make It Through the Night - 3:34
2. Blue Skies - 3:11
3. Georgia on My Mind - 3:08
4. Me and Paul - 2:35
5. City of New Orleans - 2:43
6. Please Don't Talk About Me When I'm Gone - 2:13
7. Funny How Time Slips Away - 3:12
8. Always on My Mind - 3:27
9. All of Me - 2:15
10. I Never Cared for You - 4:11
11. Walkin' the Floor Over You - 1:50
12. Stardust - 3:24

== Personnel ==
- Willie Nelson - Vocals, Guitar
- Billy Gene English - Percussion
- Paul English - Drums
- Jackie King - Guitar
- Bobbie Nelson - Piano
- Jody Payne - Guitar
- Mickey Raphael - Harmonica
- Bee Spears - Bass
