= Dream Chaser (album) =

Studio album by Willie Nelson
- Released: May 29, 2026
- Genre: Country
- Length: 30:50
- Label: Legacy
- Producer: Buddy Cannon

Willie Nelson chronology
Workin' Man (2025)	Dream Chaser (2026)

Dream Chaser is the 79th solo studio album by American singer-songwriter Willie Nelson. It was released on May 29, 2026, through Legacy Recordings.

The album was released a month after Nelson's 93rd birthday.

== Background ==
Nelson announced the album on March 18, 2026, alongside the release of the album's first single, the title track.

The title track was described as Nelson "reflecting on the rapid passage of time" by Eddie Fu of Consequence.

Dream Chaser features the first time Nelson and Bob Dylan co-wrote a song together since Across the Borderline in 1993, as the pair, alongside producer Buddy Cannon, co-wrote the song "I Can't Read Your Mind".

== Critical reception ==
Professional ratings
Review scores
Source	Rating
The Arts Desk	4/5 stars
Far Out	4/5 stars
Hot Press	7/10
Mojo	4/5 stars
Paste	B−
Uncut	9/10

Tim Cumming at The Arts Desk described Dream Chaser as "flawless and hugely enjoyable", giving particular focus to the quality of Nelson's songwriting which he found "as astute, funny and affecting as ever". Ed Power at Hot Press found the album to employ Nelson's "familiar palette" in service of "a grippingly bittersweet survey of life, aging - and whatever comes next".

== Track listing ==
Dream Chaser track listing
No.	Title	Writer(s)	Length
1.	"Dream Chaser"	Buddy Cannon; Willie Nelson; Bobby Tomberlin	3:14
2.	"Fly Away"	Cannon; Bobby Whitlock	2:42
3.	"We'd Make a Good Movie"	Cannon; Nelson; Tomberlin	3:32
4.	"I Can't Read Your Mind"	Cannon; Bob Dylan; Nelson	3:29
5.	"Whiskey Wants Me To"	Cannon; Tomberlin	2:15
6.	"Wonder What I'm Gonna Do"	Cannon; Nelson	3:53
7.	"After All"	Cannon; Nelson	2:58
8.	"Love Overdue"	Anna Lisa Graham; Donald W. Poythress; Mickey Raphael	3:00
9.	"I Don't Think I've Cried Today"	Cannon; Nelson; Tomberlin	3:24
10.	"Developing My Pictures"	Earl Montgomery	2:23
Total length:			30:50

== Personnel ==
Credits are adapted from Tidal.

- Willie Nelson – lead vocals, guitar
- Michael Rojas – Hammond organ, piano, vibraphone, Wurlitzer piano
- Fred Eltringham – drums, percussion
- Bobby Terry – acoustic guitar
- James Mitchell – electric guitar
- Mickey Raphael – harmonica
- Tommy White – steel guitar
- Ben Isaacs – upright bass
- Buddy Cannon – production
- Tony Castle – engineering, mixing
- Grant Wilson – engineering assistance
- Michelle Freetly – engineering assistance
- Andrew Mendelson – mastering
- Adam Battershell – mastering assistance
- Andrew Darby – mastering assistance
- Luke Armentrout – mastering assistance
- Thomas Oakes – mastering assistance

== Charts ==
Chart performance for Dream Chaser
Chart (2026)	Peak position
Austrian Albums (Ö3 Austria)	68
Belgian Albums (Ultratop Flanders)	159
Croatian International Albums (HDU)	13
Norwegian Albums (IFPI Norge)	76
Scottish Albums (Official Charts)	39
Swedish Physical Albums (Sverigetopplistan)	19
Swiss Albums (Schweizer Hitparade)	39
UK Albums Sales (OCC)	46
UK Americana Albums (Official Charts)	13
UK Country Albums (Official Charts)	5
US Top Album Sales (Billboard)	35
