= Island in the Sea =

Album by Willie Nelson

Studio album by Willie Nelson
- Released: 1987
- Genre: Country
- Label: Columbia
- Producer: Willie Nelson; Grady Martin; Booker T. Jones

Willie Nelson chronology
Partners (1986)	Island in the Sea (1987)	Seashores of Old Mexico (1987)

Island in the Sea is a studio album by the American musician Willie Nelson, released in 1987. The album contains two singles: the title track and "Nobody There but Me", which respectively reached No. 27 and No. 82 on the Hot Country Songs charts. "The Last Thing on My Mind" is a cover of the Tom Paxton song.

The book Willie Nelson: The Outlaw calls the album "a laid-back slice of old-time textures, including Hawaiian music, yodeling, folk, and country, with four [sic] overproduced tracks by Booker T. Jones tacked on at the end."

== Critical reception ==
Professional ratings
Review scores
Source	Rating
The Philadelphia Inquirer	3/4 stars
The Rolling Stone Album Guide	2/5 stars

The Philadelphia Inquirer praised Nelson's original compositions. The Vancouver Sun deemed the album "a trifle better than standard Willie." The Orange County Register noted that the album's first side "features the spine-tingling beauty of the unadorned Nelson sound." USA Today considered the title track to be the album's best song.

== Track listing ==
1. "Island in the Sea" (W. Nelson) - 2:19
2. "Wake Me When It's Over" (W. Nelson) - 3:17
3. "Little Things" (W. Nelson, Shirley Collie Nelson) - 4:23
4. "The Last Thing on My Mind" (Tom Paxton) - 5:17
5. "There Is No Easy Way (But There Is a Way)" (W. Nelson) - 2:32
6. "Nobody There but Me" (Bruce Hornsby, John Hornsby, Charlie Haden) - 2:47
7. "Cold November Wind" (Phyllis Horne) - 4:18
8. "Women Who Love Too Much" (Booker T. Jones, Waylon Jennings) - 4:45
9. "All in the Name of Love" (Jones, Jennings) - 4:59
10. "Sky Train" (Jones, Jennings) - 2:39

== Personnel ==
Compiled from Island in the Sea liner notes.

Musicians

- Willie Nelson - guitar, vocals
- Paul English - drums
- Mickey Raphael - harmonica
- Bee Spears - bass guitar
- Bobbie Nelson - piano
- Grady Martin - guitar
- Jody Payne - guitar, vocals
- Billy English - percussion
- Chip Young - acoustic guitar
- Mike Leech - bass guitar
- David Briggs - keyboards
- Pete Wade - electric guitar
- Martin Parker - drums
- Bobby Ogdin - piano
- Farrell Morris - percussion, vibes
- Booker T. Jones - drums, keyboards, acoustic guitar, bass guitar

On "Nobody There but Me"

- Bruce Hornsby - piano, synthesizer
- Peter Harris - guitar
- George Marinelli, Jr. - guitar
- John Mollo - drums
- Joe Puerta - bass guitar

Technical

- Bobby Arnold - engineering
- Larry Greenhill - engineering
- Booker T. Jones - production (tracks 8–10), engineering
- Grady Martin - production (track 7)
- Willie Nelson - production (tracks 1–6)
- Denny Purcell - mastering
- Glenn Rieuf - engineering
- Chip Young - engineering

== Chart performance ==
Chart (1987)	Peak position
U.S. Billboard Top Country Albums	14
