= Willie Nelson & Friends – Stars & Guitars =

Live album by Willie Nelson
- Released: November 5, 2002
- Recorded: May 27, 2002
- Genre: Country
- Length: 1:14:49
- Label: Lost Highway
- Producers: Jeb Brien, Frank Callari, Tony Faske, Allen Kelman, Gloria Medel, James Stroud

Willie Nelson chronology
All of Me – Live in Concert (2002)	Willie Nelson & Friends – Stars & Guitars (2002)	Live and Kickin' (2003)

Willie Nelson & Friends – Stars & Guitars is a 2002 live album by country singer Willie Nelson.

Professional ratings
Review scores
Source	Rating
AllMusic	2/5 stars

== Track listing ==
No.	Title	Writer(s)	Length
1.	"Whiskey River" (duet with Sheryl Crow)	Johnny Bush, Paul Stroud	2:39
2.	"Good Hearted Woman" (duet with Toby Keith)	Waylon Jennings, Willie Nelson	4:09
3.	"Maria (Shut Up and Kiss Me)" (duet with Rob Thomas)	Rob Thomas	4:01
4.	"Mendocino County Line" (duet with Lee Ann Womack)	Matt Serletic, Bernie Taupin	4:30
5.	"Always on My Mind" (duet with Jon Bon Jovi and Richie Sambora)	Johnny Christopher, Mark James, Wayne Carson Thompson	3:53
6.	"Night Life" (duet with Ray Price)	Walt Breeland, Paul Buskirk, Nelson	4:25
7.	"Dead Flowers" (duet with Ryan Adams, Keith Richards and Hank Williams III)	Mick Jagger, Keith Richards	4:55
8.	"Lonestar" (duet with Norah Jones)	Lee Alexander	3:33
9.	"Stardust" (duet with Aaron Neville)	Hoagy Carmichael, Mitchell Parish	4:17
10.	"Don't Fade Away" (duet with Brian McKnight)	Kevin Kadish, Serletic	4:27
11.	"Angel Flying Too Close to the Ground" (duet with Patty Griffin)	Nelson	4:26
12.	"For What It's Worth" (duet with Sheryl Crow)	Stephen Stills	4:25
13.	"Mammas Don't Let Your Babies Grow Up to Be Cowboys" (duet with Matchbox Twenty)	Ed Bruce, Patsy Bruce	4:26
14.	"Blue Eyes Crying in the Rain" (duet with Vince Gill)	Fred Rose	3:09
15.	"Till I Gain Control Again" (duet with Emmylou Harris)	Rodney Crowell	5:48
16.	"The Harder They Come" (duet with Ryan Adams)	Jimmy Cliff	4:26
17.	"On the Road Again"	Nelson	2:27
18.	"Move It On Over"	Hank Williams	4:58

== Personnel ==
House band (tracks 1–16, 18):

- Robert Bailey - backing vocals
- Kim Fleming - backing vocals
- Vicki Hampton - backing vocals
- Glenn Worf - bass
- Chad Cromwell - drums
- Richard Bennett - electric guitar, acoustic guitar
- Mickey Raphael - harmonica
- Jim Cox - keyboards
- Bill Evans - saxophone
- Dan Dugmore - steel guitar, acoustic guitar

== Chart performance ==
Chart (2002)	Peak position
U.S. Billboard Top Country Albums	18
U.S. Billboard 200	133
