= Face of a Fighter =

Compilation album by Willie Nelson
- Released: 1978
- Recorded: 1961
- Genre: Country
- Label: Lone Star Records

Willie Nelson chronology
Stardust (1978)	Face of a Fighter (1978)	Sweet Memories (1979)

Professional ratings
Review scores
Source	Rating
Allmusic	3/5 stars
Christgau's Record Guide	A−

Face of a Fighter is an album by country singer Willie Nelson. It was recorded in 1961 but released in 1978 when Nelson founded his own label company, Lone Star Records.

== Track listing ==
1. "Face of a Fighter"
2. "Shelter of Your Arms"
3. "End of Understanding"
4. "Is There Something on Your Mind"
5. "Some Other Time"
6. "Will You Remember Mine"
7. "Everything But You"
8. "I Hope So"
9. "A Moment Isn't Very Long"
10. "Blame It on the Times"

== Personnel ==
- Willie Nelson – Vocals, Guitar.
