= Good Ol' Country Singin' =

Compilation album by Willie Nelson
- Released: September 19, 2000
- Genre: Country
- Label: RCA Camden
- Producer: Chet Atkins, Felton Jarvis

Willie Nelson chronology
16 Biggest Hits (1998)	Good Ol' Country Singin' (2000)	All the Songs I've Loved Before: 40 Unforgettable Songs (2001)

Professional ratings
Review scores
Source	Rating
Allmusic	2/5 stars

Good Ol' Country Singin' is a compilation album by country singer Willie Nelson, released on September 19, 2000.

Originally intended to be released on the budget RCA Camden label in 1968 (CAL-2203 (mono)/CAS-2203 (stereo)), the album was compiled, but never issued. (A photo of the intended cover appears in daughter Susie Nelson's 1987 book "Heart Worn Memories".) The album finally saw official release in 2000.

Three of the songs were issued on the "Good Times" LP (released later that year), three would remain available only on 45 rpm, and three of the remaining four would remain unreleased until 1998. "You Ought to Hear Me Cry" would be issued as a single in 1977, long after Nelson left RCA Records.

== Track listing ==
Songs are written by Willie Nelson except as noted.

1. "Ashamed" - 2:15 (Released on "Good Times" LP, 1968)
2. "He Sits at My Table" - 2:33 (1966 single B-side)
3. "Tender Years" - (Darrell Edwards) - 2:26 (Unreleased)
4. "Down to Our Last Goodbye" - (Crutchfield, Moss) - 2:42 (Released on "Good Times" LP, 1968)
5. "Blackjack County Chain" - (Red Lane) - 2:04 (1968 single A-side)
6. "Did I Ever Love You" - 2:30 (Released on "Good Times" LP, 1968)
7. "Something to Think About" - 2:35 (Unreleased studio version)
8. "I Don't Feel Anything" - 2:46 (Unreleased early version)
9. "You Ought to Hear Me Cry" - 2:37 (Originally unreleased, issued as single A-side in 1977)
10. "I'm Still Not over You" - 2:43 (1966 single B-side)

== Personnel ==
- Willie Nelson - Guitar, Vocals
