= A Horse Called Music =

Studio album by Willie Nelson
- Released: 1989
- Studio: Digital Recorders, House of David Nashville, TN Perdenales Spicewood, TX
- Genre: Country
- Length: 34:04
- Label: Columbia
- Producer: Fred Foster

Willie Nelson chronology
What a Wonderful World (1987)	A Horse Called Music (1989)	Born for Trouble (1990)

Singles from A Horse Called Music
- 1. "Nothing I Can Do About It Now" Released: April 1989; 2. "There You Are" Released: September 1989

Professional ratings
Review scores
Source	Rating
AllMusic	3/5 stars
Robert Christgau	B
The Encyclopedia of Popular Music	3/5 stars

A Horse Called Music is a studio album by the country singer Willie Nelson, released in 1989. The album includes Nelson's last number 1 single, "Nothing I Can Do About It Now". "There You Are" peaked at No. 8 on the Billboard country chart.

== Track listing ==
1. "Nothing I Can Do About It Now" (Beth Nielsen Chapman) – 3:17
2. "The Highway" (Tom Conner, Richard Wesley) – 3:55
3. "I Never Cared For You" (Nelson) – 2:25
4. "If I Were a Painting" (Skip Ewing, Don Sampson) – 3:20
5. "Spirit" (Kent Robbins, William Robinson) – 4:16
6. "There You Are" (Kye Fleming, Mike Reid) – 3:04
7. "Mr. Record Man" (Nelson)– 2:08
8. "If My World Didn't Have You" (Chapman)– 3:42
9. "A Horse Called Music" (Wayne Carson Thompson)– 4:26
10. "Is the Better Part Over" (Nelson)– 3:31

== Personnel ==
- Willie Nelson – Acoustic Guitar, vocals
- Thomas Brannon – Vocals
- Larry Byrom – Electric Guitar
- Beth Nielsen Chapman – Vocals
- Billy Gene English – Percussion, Drums
- Paul English – Drums
- Scott Jarrett – Vocals
- Wendy Suits Johnson – Vocals
- Jana King – Vocals
- Larrie Londin – Drums
- Grady Martin – Electric Guitar
- Farrell Morris – Percussion
- Bobbie Nelson – Piano
- Louis Dean Nunley – Vocals
- Bobby Ogdin – Piano
- Larry Paxton – Bass
- Jody Payne – Electric Guitar
- Don Potter – Acoustic Guitar
- Mickey Raphael – Harmonica
- Ronnie Reno – Mandola
- Lisa Silver – Vocals
- Bee Spears – Bass
- Bergen White – Arranger, Vocals
- Chip Young – Acoustic Guitar
- Reggie Young – Acoustic Guitar

== Charts ==
=== Weekly charts ===
Chart (1989)	Peak position
Australian Albums (ARIA)	132
US Top Country Albums (Billboard)	2

=== Year-end charts ===
Chart (1989)	Position
US Top Country Albums (Billboard)	53
Chart (1990)	Position
US Top Country Albums (Billboard)	50
