= Capitol Collectors Series =

Capitol Collectors Series may refer to:

- Capitol Collectors Series (Grand Funk Railroad album), 1991
- Capitol Collectors Series (Jo Stafford album), 1991
- Capitol Collectors Series (The Kingston Trio album), 1990
- Capitol Collectors Series (Nat King Cole album), 1990
- Capitol Collectors Series (Peggy Lee album), 1990
- Capitol Collectors Series (Sammy Davis Jr. album), 1990
- Capitol Collectors Series (Dean Martin album), 1989
- Capitol Collectors Series (Frank Sinatra album), 1989
- Capitol Collectors Series (Raspberries album), 1991
- Capitol Collectors Series (The Seekers album), 1992
