= Born for Trouble (album) =

Studio album by Willie Nelson
- Released: 1990
- Genre: Country
- Length: 32:24
- Label: Columbia
- Producer: Fred Foster

Willie Nelson chronology
A Horse Called Music (1989)	Born for Trouble (1990)	The IRS Tapes: Who'll Buy My Memories? (1991)

Singles from Born for Trouble
- 1. "Ain't Necessarily So" Released: September 1990

Professional ratings
Review scores
Source	Rating
AllMusic	2/5 stars

Born for Trouble is the 38th studio album by country singer Willie Nelson. It was his first release of the 1990s. The album includes the singles "Ain't Necessarily So" and "Ten with a Two."

== Track listing ==
1. "Ain't Necessarily So"
2. "(I Don't Have a Reason) To Go to California Anymore"
3. "Ten With a Two"
4. "The Piper Came Today"
5. "You Decide"
6. "Pieces of My Life"
7. "It'll Come to Me"
8. "This Is How Without You Goes"
9. "Born for Trouble"
10. "Little Things Mean a Lot"

== Charts ==
=== Weekly charts ===
Chart (1990)	Peak position
Australian Albums (ARIA)	180
US Top Country Albums (Billboard)	31

=== Year-end charts ===
Chart (1991)	Position
US Top Country Albums (Billboard)	70
