= Collector's Series (Willie Nelson album) =

Compilation album by Willie Nelson
- Released: 1985
- Genre: Country
- Label: RCA Records

Willie Nelson chronology
| 20 of the Best (1982) | Collector's Series (1985) | Half Nelson (1985) |

Collector's Series is a 1985 compilation album by country singer Willie Nelson.

== Track listing ==
All tracks composed by Willie Nelson; except where indicated

1. "Night Life" (Nelson, Walt Breeland, Paul Buskirk)
2. "Funny How Time Slips Away"
3. "Crazy Arms" (Ralph Mooney, Chuck Seals)
4. "Healing Hands of Time"
5. "Yesterday's Wine"
6. "Today I Started Loving You Again" (Merle Haggard, Bonnie Owens)
7. "Rainy Day Blues"
8. "San Antonio Rose" (Bob Wills)
9. "Heartaches by the Number" (Harlan Howard)
10. "Born to Lose" (Frankie Brown, Ted Daffan)
11. "Have I Told You Lately That I Love You" (Scotty Wiseman)
12. "One in a Row"
13. "Good Hearted Woman" (Nelson, Waylon Jennings)
14. "Help Me Make It Through the Night" (Kris Kristofferson)

== Personnel ==
- Willie Nelson - Guitar, vocals
