= The IRS Tapes: Who'll Buy My Memories? =

Studio album by Willie Nelson
- Released: June 1991 (mail-order); December 8, 1992 (wide release)
- Genre: Country
- Length: 61:35
- Label: Sony Music Special Products
- Producer: Bob Johnston

Willie Nelson chronology
Born for Trouble (1990)	The IRS Tapes: Who'll Buy My Memories? (1991)	Clean Shirt (1991)

The IRS Tapes: Who'll Buy My Memories? is the 39th studio album by American country and western singer Willie Nelson. The album, featuring only Nelson and his guitar, was released by Sony Music in 1992 to pay Nelson's tax debt with the IRS. Initially, the album was only distributed by phone order in June 1991, but later negotiations with Sony saw it being distributed in stores.

The album generated $3.6 million for the IRS, who requested a further $9 million from Nelson to satisfy his debts. It was well received by critics.

== Background and recording ==
In 1990, the Internal Revenue Service (IRS) seized most of Nelson's assets, claiming that he owed US$16 million. It was later discovered that his accountants, Price Waterhouse, had not been paying Nelson's taxes for years. In addition to the unpaid taxes, Nelson's situation was worsened by the weak investments he had made during the early 1980s. His lawyer, Jay Goldberg, renegotiated a settlement with the IRS in which he paid US$6 million, although Nelson did not comply with the agreement.

To pay his debt, Nelson recorded The IRS Tapes: Who'll Buy My Memories, featuring him and his guitar, without the accompaniment of his band. The album constituted a compilation of Nelson's hits. A second tape of 1976 recordings The Hungry Years was offered to direct sales purchasers at the same time.

== Release and reception ==
The album was released in 1992. By that time, Nelson's assets had been auctioned; the items were returned to Nelson by fans and friends who purchased them. Nelson promoted the album during a benefit concert for the restoration of the Texas State Capitol. During an appearance on Primetime Live, Nelson wore a T-shirt with the nonexistent toll-free number 1-800-IRS-TAPE, that allegedly was the number to call to order the album. After 500 calls, Jon Richards, the owner of Visual Technology. Inc., announced that he would let Nelson lease or purchase the number to help the sales of the album. Besides the phone orders, Nelson also negotiated with Sony Music to distribute the album in stores. The IRS collected US$3.6 million from the sales of the album, and after a payment of US$9 million during the next five years, Nelson's debt was satisfied.

Professional ratings
Review scores
Source	Rating
AllMusic	3.5/5 stars
Chicago Tribune	3.5/5 stars
Entertainment Weekly	B+
Houston Chronicle	4.5/5 stars

Entertainment Weekly rated the album with a B+: "The album features only Nelson's warm, emotive baritone and the deft accompaniment of his acoustic guitar. All of these tunes explain how he came close to being a deity in his native Texas, bringing together hippies and rednecks in pure appreciation of his music."

Chicago Tribune rated the album three-and-a-half stars out of five: "Even before his staggering tax problems, Nelson had become such a cross-market figure that it was easy to forget that, at bottom, he is one of country music history's most literate and sensitive songwriters and succinctly evocative singers [...] [The album of songs], some familiar and some not, re-emphasizes that. It presents him at his most effective, with just his guitar and memories." Houston Chronicle commented: "Nelson sounds so naturally relaxed you can picture him stretching out on your sofa when he's finished his tune. With no band to kick him from behind or schmaltzy string sections to waltz around, Nelson distills the deeply personal emotion in these songs to its universal essence, which is what great folk singing always has been about."

Thom Owens wrote for AllMusic: "Over the course of the set, Nelson plays a handful of unusual tracks, several new tunes, and a few of his most familiar songs. The result is one of Nelson's most direct and affecting albums, featuring several of his finest vocal performances."

== Track listing ==
All the songs are written by Nelson. "What Can You Do to Me Now" was co-written with Hank Cochran.

=== Disc 1 ===
No.	Title	Length
1.	"Who'll Buy My Memories"	3:12
2.	"Jimmy's Road"	2:39
3.	"It Should Be Easier Now"	2:16
4.	"Will You Remember Mine"	2:31
5.	"I Still Can't Believe You're Gone"	2:45
6.	"Yesterday's Wine"	2:25
7.	"It's Not Supposed to Be That Way"	2:16
8.	"Country Willie"	3:43
9.	"Sound in Your Mind"	3:08
10.	"Permanently Lonely"	2:17
11.	"So Much to Do"	2:05
12.	"Lonely Little Mansion"	2:06

=== Disc 2 ===
No.	Title	Length
1.	"Summer of Roses/December Day"	3:51
2.	"Pretend I Never Happened"	3:02
3.	"Slow Down Old World"	1:52
4.	"Opportunity to Cry"	2:21
5.	"I'm Falling in Love Again"	3:25
6.	"If You Could Only See"	2:33
7.	"I'd Rather You Didn't Love Me"	2:28
8.	"What Can You Do to Me Now"	2:48
9.	"Buddy"	1:53
10.	"Remember the Good Times"	1:32
11.	"Wake Me When It's Over"	1:53
12.	"Home Motel"	2:34
