= Old Friends (The Expos album) =

Studio album by The Expos
- Released: January 24, 2007
- Genre: Reggae, Pop
- Length: 43:32
- Label: Stomp
- Producer: Mitch Girio

The Expos chronology
Old Friends (2007)	Blackwater (2009)

Old Friends is an album by The Expos which was re-released on January 24, 2007 on Stomp.The Album was originally released by The Donuts, The Expos under a different name. It has been remastered, with all of the problems the band had with the record fixed.

== Track listing ==
1. "Before Breakfast" - 4:48
2. "On The Road" - 3:40
3. "Little Red Hook" - 3:22
4. "White Gunn" - 1:52
5. "School Days" - 4:47
6. "Old Friends" - 3:25
7. "Dans La Rue Ou Vit Celle Que J'Aime" - 3:39
8. "This Time Around" - 5:44
9. "Black Gunn" - 1:52
10. "To Be In Love, Under Rain" - 3:06
11. "Brawl" - 3:26
12. "A Flower For Tara" - 3:56

== Personnel ==
- Adam Marcinkowski - Trombone
- Reed Neagle - Drums, Vocals
- Adam Pariselli - Lead Guitar
- Christopher Shannon - Bass guitar
- Michel Verrier - Organ, Vocals, Guitar, Saxophone
