= Greatest Hits (& Some That Will Be) =

Compilation album by Willie Nelson
- Released: August 21, 1981
- Recorded: 1974–1980
- Genre: Country
- Length: 68:10
- Label: Columbia
- Producer: Dave Grusin; Booker T. Jones; Arif Mardin; Willie Nelson; Sydney Pollack; Larry Rosen; Leon Russell

Willie Nelson chronology
His Very Best (1980)	Greatest Hits (& Some That Will Be) (1981)	Minstrel Man (1981)

Professional ratings
Review scores
Source	Rating
AllMusic	5/5 stars

Greatest Hits (& Some That Will Be) is a compilation album by American country music artist Willie Nelson. It was released in 1981 as a double-LP. It has sold 6 million copies worldwide. The album was reissued on CD in 2003 with the inclusion of three bonus tracks.

== Track listing ==
=== Side A ===
No.	Title	Writer(s)	Length
1.	"Railroad Lady"	Jimmy Buffett; Jerry Jeff Walker	2:38
2.	"Heartaches of a Fool"	Willie Nelson; Walt Breeland; Paul Buskirk	2:28
3.	"Blue Eyes Crying in the Rain"	Fred Rose	2:17
4.	"Whiskey River"	John Bush Shinn III; Paul Stroud	3:31
5.	"Good Hearted Woman"	Waylon Jennings; Nelson	2:57
Total length:			17:07

=== Side B ===
No.	Title	Writer(s)	Length
1.	"Georgia on My Mind"	Hoagy Carmichael; Stuart Gorrell	4:19
2.	"If You've Got the Money I've Got the Time"	Lefty Frizzell; James A. Beck	2:05
3.	"Look What Thoughts Will Do"	Frizzell; Dub Dickerson; James A. Beck	2:40
4.	"Uncloudy Day"	Josiah Kelley Alwood, arranged by Willie Nelson	4:38
5.	"Mammas Don't Let Your Babies Grow Up to Be Cowboys"	Ed Bruce; Patsy Bruce	3:25
Total length:			17:07

=== Side C ===
No.	Title	Writer(s)	Length
1.	"My Heroes Have Always Been Cowboys"	Sharon Vaughn	3:02
2.	"Help Me Make It Through the Night"	Kris Kristofferson	3:57
3.	"Angel Flying Too Close to the Ground"	Nelson	4:23
4.	"I'd Have to Be Crazy"	Steve Fromholz	3:24
5.	"Faded Love"	Bob Wills; John Wills; Billy Jack Wills	3:48
Total length:			18:34

=== Side D ===
No.	Title	Writer(s)	Length
1.	"On the Road Again"	Nelson	2:39
2.	"Heartbreak Hotel"	Mae Boren Axton; Thomas Durden; Elvis Presley	3:00
3.	"If You Could Touch Her at All"	Lee Clayton	3:27
4.	"'Til I Gain Control Again"	Rodney Crowell	5:59
5.	"Stay a Little Longer"	Bob Wills; Tommy Duncan	3:24
Total length:			18:29

=== 2003 CD edition ===
1. "Railroad Lady" – 2:38
2. "Heartaches of a Fool" – 2:28
3. "Blue Eyes Crying in the Rain" – 2:17
4. "Whiskey River" – 3:31
5. "Good Hearted Woman" – 2:57
6. "Georgia on My Mind" – 4:19
7. "All of Me" (bonus track) – 3:55
8. "If You've Got the Money I've Got the Time" – 2:05
9. "Look What Thoughts Will Do" – 2:40
10. "Remember Me" (bonus track) – 2:52
11. "Uncloudy Day" – 4:38
12. "Mammas Don't Let Your Babies Grow Up to Be Cowboys" – 3:25
13. "My Heroes Have Always Been Cowboys" – 3:02
14. "Help Me Make It Through the Night" – 3:57
15. "Angel Flying Too Close to the Ground" – 4:23
16. "I'd Have to Be Crazy" – 3:24
17. "Faded Love" – 3:48
18. "On the Road Again" – 2:39
19. "Midnight Rider" (bonus track) – 2:52
20. "Heartbreak Hotel" – 3:00
21. "If You Could Touch Her at All" – 3:27
22. "'Til I Gain Control Again" – 5:59
23. "Stay a Little Longer" – 3:24

Total Length = 77:40

== Chart performance ==
Chart (1981)	Peak position
U.S. Billboard Top Country Albums	1
U.S. Billboard 200	27
