= Willie Nelson: His Very Best =

His Very Best

Compilation album by Willie Nelson
- Released: 1980
- Genre: Country
- Label: CBS Records Canada

Willie Nelson chronology
Always (1980)	His Very Best (1980)	Greatest Hits (& Some That Will Be) (1981)

His Very Best is a 1980 compilation album by Willie Nelson. It was certified double platinum in Canada in 1984.

== Track listing ==
1. Stardust - 3:50
2. Blue Eyes Crying In The Rain - 2:17
3. Me And Bobby McGee - 5:13
4. I Love You A Thousand Ways - 2:57
5. All Of Me - 3:52
6. Help Me Make It Through The Night - 3:57
7. Georgia on My Mind - 4:17
8. Red Headed Stranger - 3:58
9. If You've Got The Money, I've Got The Time - 2:03
10. Whiskey River - 2:45
11. Mammas Don't Let Your Babies Grow Up To Be Cowboys - 3:27
12. Blue Skies - 3:31
13. Good Hearted Woman - 2:52
14. Medley:Funny How Time Slips Away/Crazy/Night Live - 8:31
15. Remember Me - 2:49
16. September Song - 4:32
17. Heartbreak Hotel - 3:00
18. I'm A Memory - 1:55
19. Uncloudy Day - 4:38
20. Amazing Grace - 5:38
