= Outlaws and Angels (album) =

Live album by Willie Nelson
- Released: September 21, 2004
- Recorded: May 5, 2004
- Venues: The Wiltern, Los Angeles
- Genre: Country
- Length: 70:40
- Label: Lost Highway
- Producer: James Stroud

Willie Nelson chronology
Live at Billy Bob's Texas (2004)	Outlaws and Angels (2004)	Songs for Tsunami Relief: Austin to South Asia (2005)

Outlaws and Angels is a live album by American country and western musician Willie Nelson. It was recorded on May 5, 2004, at The Wiltern in Los Angeles, California. It was released on September 21, 2004, by the Lost Highway label. The concert featured guest performers singing duets with Nelson on each song and was later aired on cable television.

== Track listing ==
No.	Title	Writer(s)	Guest artists	Length
1.	"Georgia on a Fast Train"	Billy Joe Shaver	Toby Keith, Joe Walsh	3:31
2.	"Ramblin' Fever"	Merle Haggard	Toby Keith, Joe Walsh, Merle Haggard	3:19
3.	"Shotgun Willie"	Willie Nelson	Kid Rock	2:46
4.	"Rainin' in My Heart"	Al Green, Willie Mitchell	Al Green	4:28
5.	"Stormy Weather"	Harold Arlen, Ted Koehler	Shelby Lynne	3:17
6.	"Will You Still Love Me Tomorrow"	Gerry Goffin, Carole King	Carole King	4:03
7.	"Still Is Still Moving to Me"	Willie Nelson	Toots Hibbert	3:33
8.	"Midnight Rider"	Gregg Allman, Robert Payne	Ben Harper	3:41
9.	"Pressure Drop"	Toots Hibbert	Toots Hibbert	3:55
10.	"I'll Never Be Free"	Benny Benjamin, George David Weiss	Lee Ann Womack	2:45
11.	"Opportunity to Cry"	Willie Nelson	The Holmes Brothers	4:04
12.	"Cisco Kid"	Thomas Allen, B. B. Dickerson, Harold Ray Brown, Charles Miller	Los Lonely Boys	3:49
13.	"Pancho and Lefty"	Townes Van Zandt	Merle Haggard, Toby Keith	5:00
14.	"Overtime"	Lucinda Williams	Lucinda Williams	3:38
15.	"Mama Tried"	Merle Haggard	Merle Haggard, Toby Keith	2:08
16.	"Comes Love"	Charles Tobias, Lew Brown, Sam Stept	Rickie Lee Jones	4:09
17.	"We Had It All"	Troy Seals, Donnie Fritts	Keith Richards	3:27
18.	"Whole Lotta Shakin' Goin' On"	Dave "Curlee" Williams, James Faye "Roy" Hall	Jerry Lee Lewis, Kid Rock, Keith Richards, Merle Haggard	5:21
19.	"I'll Fly Away"	Albert E. Brumley	Merle Haggard	3:46

- "Rainin' in My Heart" is a Wille Nelson/Al Green duet cover of a song co-written by Green for his 2003 album, I Can't Stop. Certain song databases have mistakenly classified Green's song as a cover of Slim Harpo's "Rainin' in My Heart", written by James Moore (aka Slim Harpo) and Jerry West (aka J.D. Miller).

== Personnel ==
- Willie Nelson - acoustic guitar, vocals
- Garrett Adkins - trombone
- James Caan - emcee
- Bill Churchville - trumpet
- Jim Cox - keyboards
- Hutch Hutchinson - bass
- Jim Keltner - drums
- Greg Leisz - pedal steel guitar
- Nils Lofgren - guitar
- Kenny Lovelace - guitar
- Ivan Neville - piano
- Mickey Raphael - harmonica
- Jimmy Ripp - guitar
- Peter Tilden - spoken voice
- Biff Watson - guitar
- David Woodford - saxophone

Backing vocals

- Bernard Fowler
- Stacie Michelle
- Julia Waters Tillman
- Maxine Waters Willard

== Chart performance ==
Chart (2004)	Peak position
U.S. Billboard Top Country Albums	10
U.S. Billboard 200	69

== Certifications ==
Region	Certification	Certified units/sales
Australia (ARIA)	Gold	7,500^{^}
^{^} Shipments figures based on certification alone.
