= List of UK Country Albums Chart number ones of 2019 =

These are the Official Charts Company's UK Country Albums Chart number ones of 2019. The chart week runs from Friday to Thursday with the chart-date given as the following Thursday. Chart positions are based the multi-metric consumption of country music in the United Kingdom, blending traditional album sales, track equivalent albums, and streaming equivalent albums. The chart contains 20 positions.

In the iteration of the chart dated 4 January, Golden Hour by Kacey Musgraves spent its sixth total week at number one, having held the top spot for the final week of 2018 and remaining there for the first five weeks of 2019, bringing its total to ten weeks in the top spot. British sister duo Ward Thomas spent three consecutive weeks at number one with their third studio album Restless Minds, and were displaced by Yola's Walk Through Fire, the first album by a black woman to top the chart. The artist with the most weeks at number one in 2019 was Kiefer Sutherland, whose Reckless & Me spent five consecutive weeks at the chart peak beginning in May, and then returned to the top spot for another two weeks in July. Willie Nelson spent four weeks at number one with his sixty-ninth release Ride Me Back Home. Sheryl Crow spent six weeks atop the chart with her collaborative project Threads which, at the time, was touted as her final album. Following the release of his second album, What You See Is What You Get , Luke Combs had a total of four non-consecutive weeks at number one, separated by Lady Antebellum's three-week chart-topper Ocean, their seventh album to reach the chart peak. Other artists who spent multiple weeks at number one include Francis Rossi & Hannah Rickards, Jessie Buckley, Steve Earle, Thomas Rhett, and Tyler Childers, who each spent two weeks atop the chart. The final number one of the year was What You See Is What You Get.

== Chart history ==
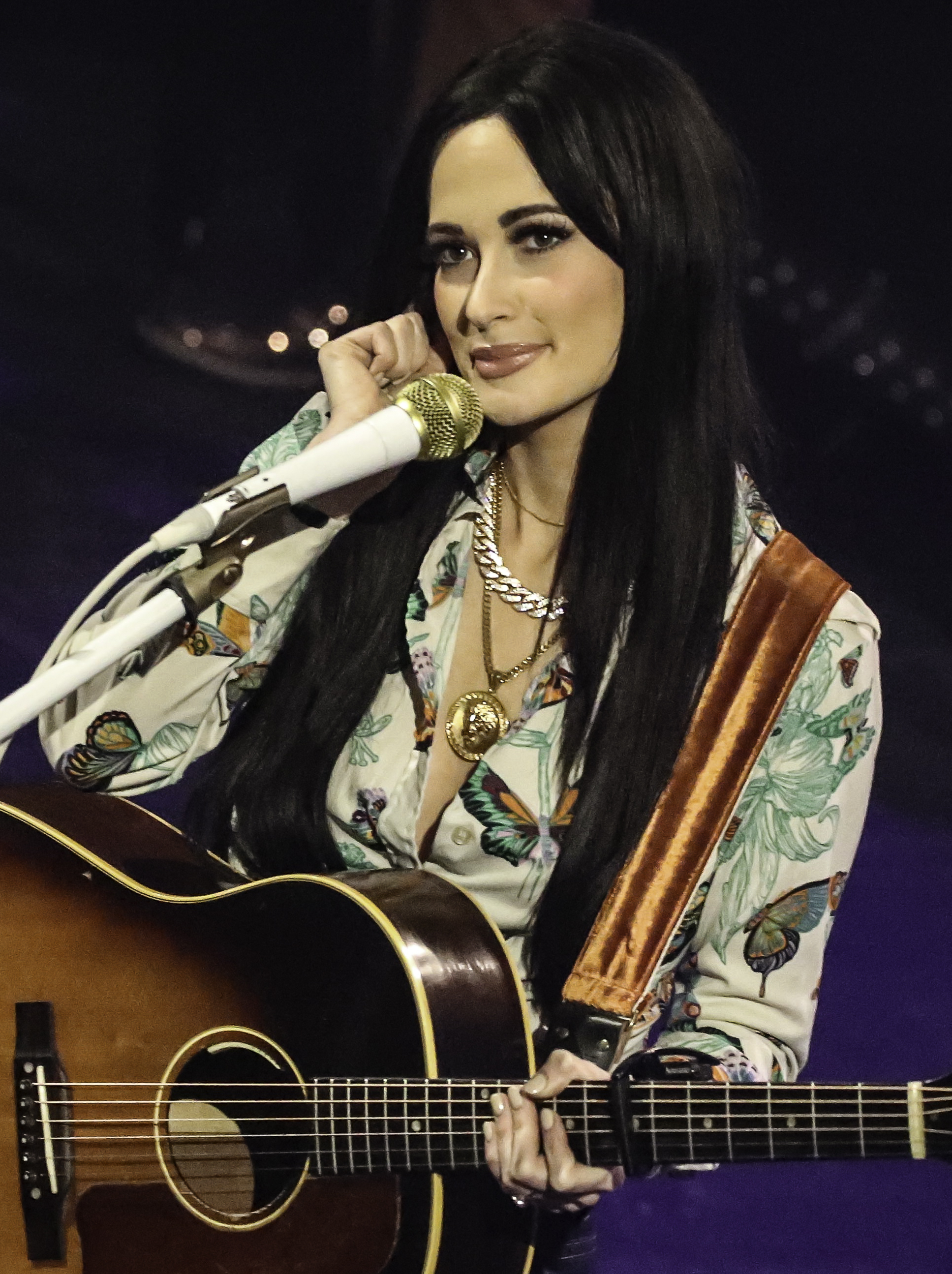
Golden Hour, the critically acclaimed third album by Kacey Musgraves spent the first five weeks of the year in the top spot.

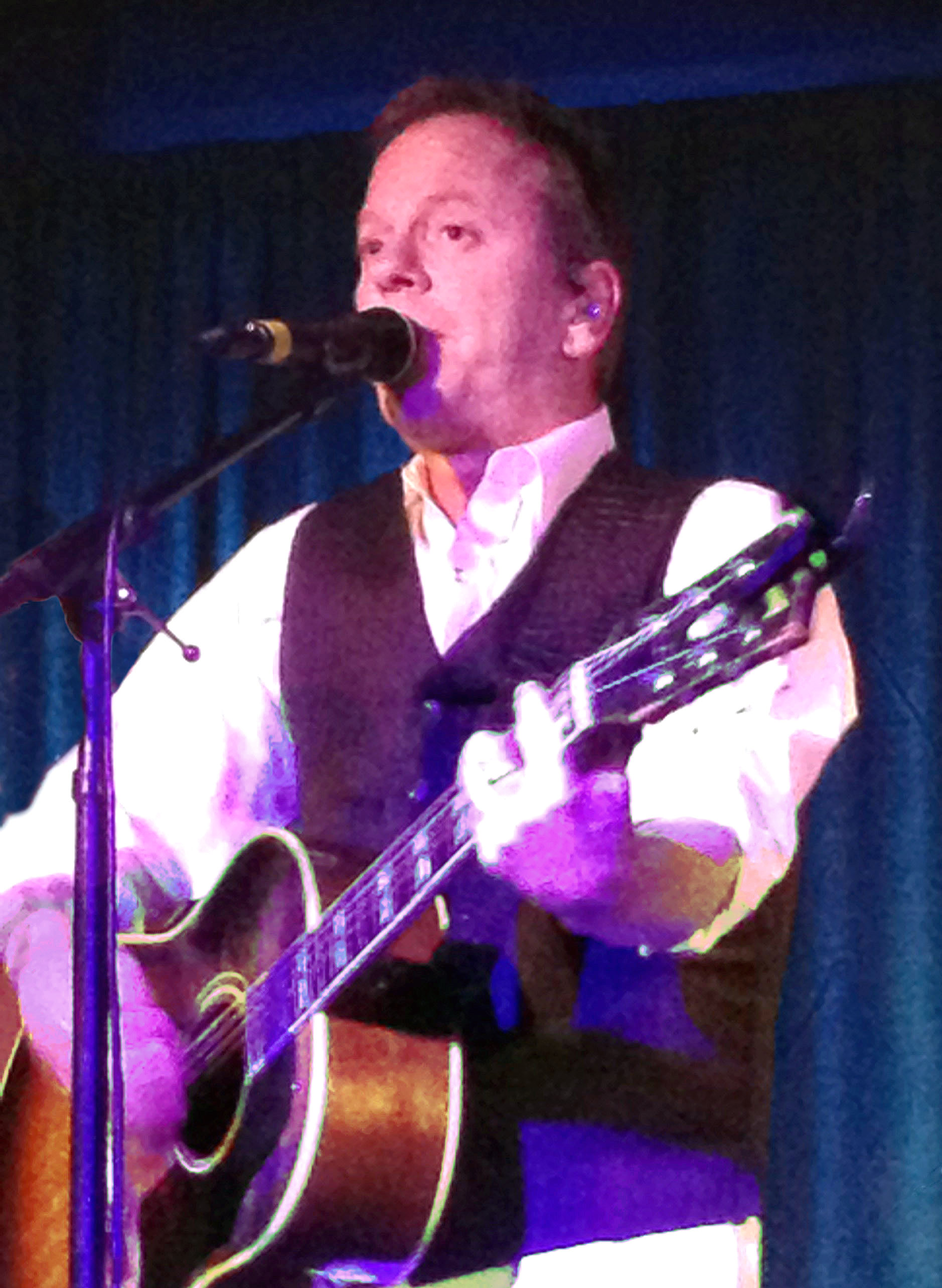
Kiefer Sutherland's Reckless & Me spent a leading seven weeks at number one in 2019.

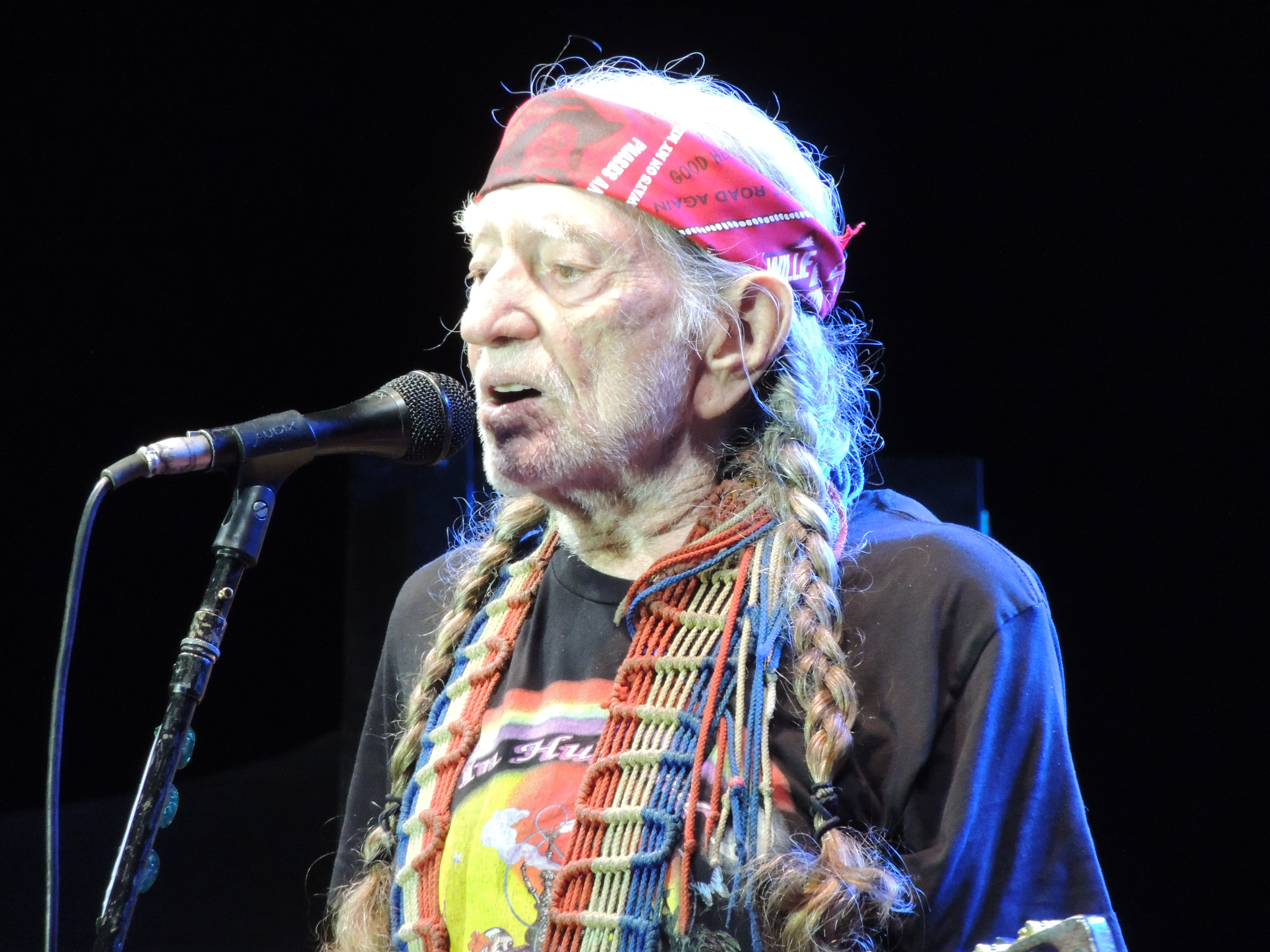
Veteran artist Willie Nelson's sixty-ninth album Ride Me Back Home remained at the chart peak for four weeks.

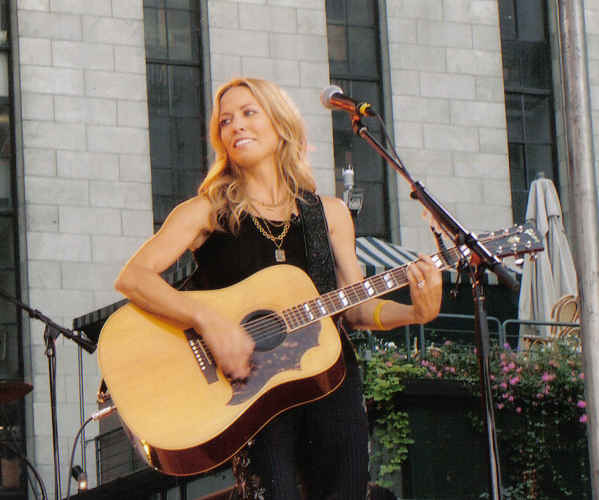
Sheryl Crow spent six weeks at number one with Threads, widely publicised at the time to be her final album.

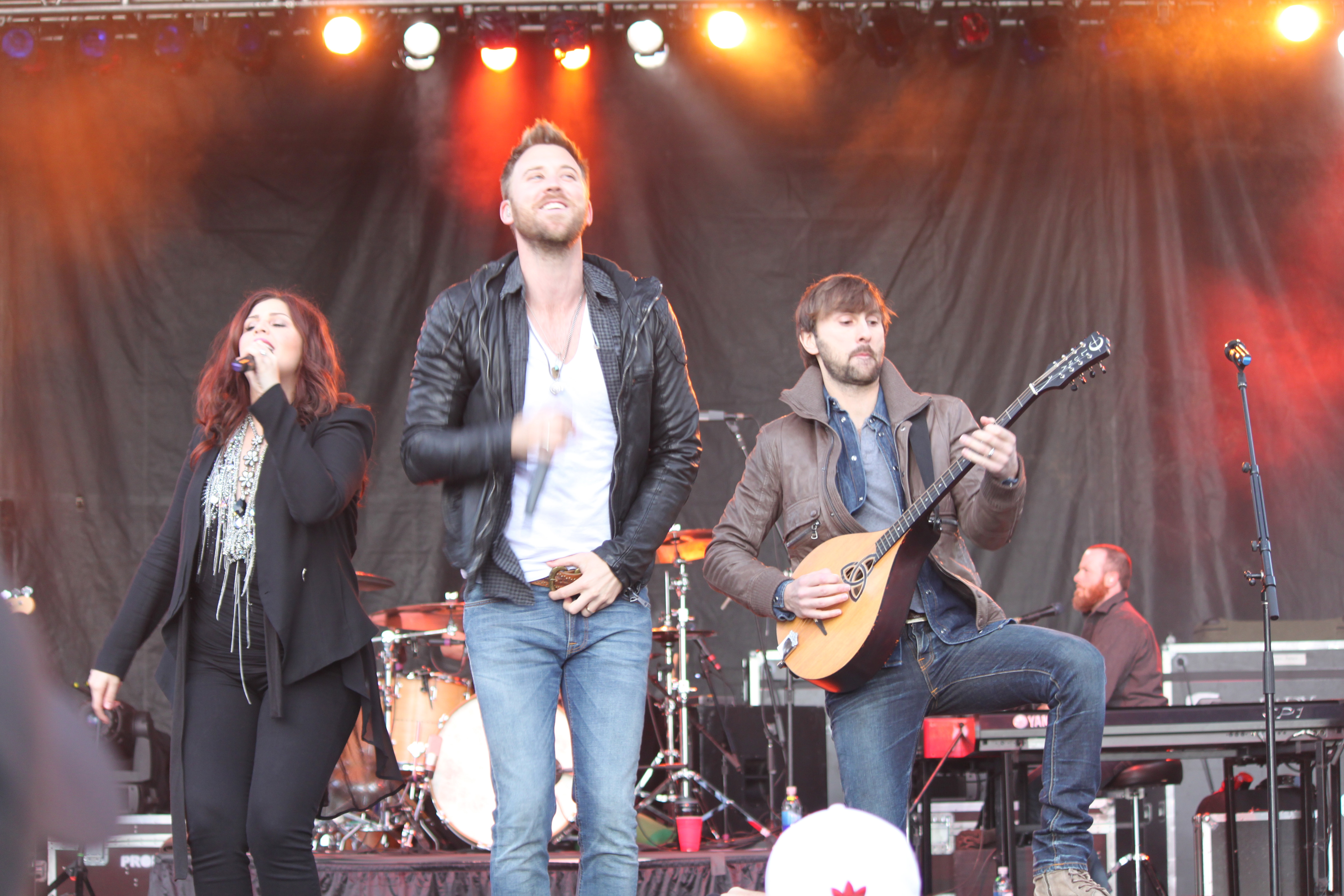
Lady Antebellum's Ocean held the top spot for three consecutive weeks.

Issue date	Album	Artist(s)	Record label	Ref.
4 January	Golden Hour	Kacey Musgraves	Mercury Nashville	
11 January	Golden Hour	Kacey Musgraves	Mercury Nashville	
18 January	Golden Hour	Kacey Musgraves	Mercury Nashville	
25 January	Golden Hour	Kacey Musgraves	Mercury Nashville	
1 February	Golden Hour	Kacey Musgraves	Mercury Nashville	
8 February	Wild Silence	The Wandering Hearts	Decca	
15 February	Restless Minds	Ward Thomas	Sony	
22 February	Restless Minds	Ward Thomas	Sony	
1 March	Restless Minds	Ward Thomas	Sony	
8 March	Walk Through Fire	Yola	Nonesuch	
15 March	Girl	Maren Morris	Columbia Nashville	
22 March	We Talk Too Much	Francis Rossi & Hannah Rickards	Ear Music	
29 March	We Talk Too Much	Francis Rossi & Hannah Rickards	Ear Music	
5 April	Guy	Steve Earle	New West	
12 April	Guy	Steve Earle	New West	
19 April	Wild Rose	Jessie Buckley	Island	
26 April	Wild Rose	Jessie Buckley	Island	
3 May	Reckless & Me	Kiefer Sutherland	BMG	
10 May	Reckless & Me	Kiefer Sutherland	BMG	
17 May	Reckless & Me	Kiefer Sutherland	BMG	
24 May	Reckless & Me	Kiefer Sutherland	BMG	
31 May	Reckless & Me	Kiefer Sutherland	BMG	
7 June	Center Point Road	Thomas Rhett	Valory	
14 June	Center Point Road	Thomas Rhett	Valory	
21 June	Wonderland	Sarah Darling	Be Darling	
28 June	Ride Me Back Home	Willie Nelson	Legacy	
5 July	Ride Me Back Home	Willie Nelson	Legacy	
12 July	Ride Me Back Home	Willie Nelson	Legacy	
19 July	Ride Me Back Home	Willie Nelson	Legacy	
26 July	Reckless & Me	Kiefer Sutherland	BMG	
2 August	Reckless & Me	Kiefer Sutherland	BMG	
9 August	Country Squire	Tyler Childers	RCA	
16 August	Country Squire	Tyler Childers	RCA	
23 August	Traveller	Chris Stapleton	Mercury Nashville	
30 August	Let It Roll	Midland	Big Machine	
6 September	Threads	Sheryl Crow	Big Machine	
13 September	Threads	Sheryl Crow	Big Machine	
20 September	Threads	Sheryl Crow	Big Machine	
27 September	Threads	Sheryl Crow	Big Machine	
4 October	The Owl	Zac Brown Band	BMG	
11 October	Threads	Sheryl Crow	Big Machine	
18 October	Threads	Sheryl Crow	Big Machine	
25 October	Graffiti U	Keith Urban	Hit Red	
1 November	Old Dominion	Old Dominion	RCA Nashville	
15 November	Wildcard	Miranda Lambert	RCA Nashville/Vanner	
15 November	What You See is What You Get	Luke Combs	Columbia Nashville/River House	
22 November	What You See is What You Get	Luke Combs	Columbia Nashville/River House	
29 November	Ocean	Lady Antebellum	Big Machine	
6 December	Ocean	Lady Antebellum	Big Machine	
13 December	Ocean	Lady Antebellum	Big Machine	
20 December	What You See is What You Get	Luke Combs	Columbia Nashville/River House	
27 December	What You See is What You Get	Luke Combs	Columbia Nashville/River House	

== Most weeks at number one ==
Weeks at number one	Artist
7	Kiefer Sutherland
6	Sheryl Crow
5	Kacey Musgraves
4	Luke Combs
4	Willie Nelson
3	Lady Antebellum
3	Ward Thomas
2	Francis Rossi & Hannah Rickards
2	Jessie Buckley
2	Steve Earle
2	Thomas Rhett
2	Tyler Childers

== See also ==
- List of UK Albums Chart number ones of 2019
- List of UK Dance Singles Chart number ones of 2019
- List of UK Album Downloads Chart number ones of 2019
- List of UK Independent Albums Chart number ones of 2019
- List of UK R&B Albums Chart number ones of 2019
- List of UK Rock & Metal Albums Chart number ones of 2019
- List of UK Compilation Chart number ones of the 2010s
