= List of UK Independent Singles Chart number ones of 2019 =

These are the Official Charts Company's UK Independent Singles Chart number-one singles of 2019.

== Chart history ==
Chart date (week ending)	Song	Artist(s)	Record label	References
3 January	"Stay Another Day"	East 17	London	
10 January	"Lost Without You"	Freya Ridings	Good Soldier	
17 January	"Lost Without You"	Freya Ridings	Good Soldier	
24 January	"Lost Without You"	Freya Ridings	Good Soldier	
31 January	"Lost Without You"	Freya Ridings	Good Soldier	
7 February	"Lost Without You"	Freya Ridings	Good Soldier	
14 February	"Lost Without You"	Freya Ridings	Good Soldier	
21 February	"Advice"	Cadet & Deno Driz	Underrated Legends	
28 February	"Advice"	Cadet & Deno Driz	Underrated Legends	
7 March	"Thotiana"	Blueface	Entertainment One	
14 March	"I'm So Tired..."	Lauv & Troye Sivan	Lauv	
21 March	"I'm So Tired..."	Lauv & Troye Sivan	Lauv	
28 March	"I'm So Tired..."	Lauv & Troye Sivan	Lauv	
4 April	"I'm So Tired..."	Lauv & Troye Sivan	Lauv	
11 April	"Boasty"	Wiley, Stefflon Don and Sean Paul	BMG	
18 April	"Boasty"	Wiley, Stefflon Don and Sean Paul	BMG	
25 April	"Boasty"	Wiley, Stefflon Don and Sean Paul	BMG	
2 May	"Boasty"	Wiley, Stefflon Don and Sean Paul	BMG	
9 May	"Boasty"	Wiley, Stefflon Don and Sean Paul	BMG	
16 May	"Boasty"	Wiley, Stefflon Don and Sean Paul	BMG	
23 May	"Boasty"	Wiley, Stefflon Don and Sean Paul	BMG	
30 May	"Boasty"	Wiley, Stefflon Don and Sean Paul	BMG	
6 June	"Boasty"	Wiley, Stefflon Don and Sean Paul	BMG	
13 June	"What Do You Mean"	Skepta featuring J Hus	Boy Better Know	
20 June	"Boasty"	Wiley, Stefflon Don and Sean Paul	BMG	
27 June	"Ladbroke Grove"	AJ Tracey	AJ Tracey	
4 July	"Kilos"	Bugzy Malone featuring Aitch	BSomebody	
11 July	"Ladbroke Grove"	AJ Tracey	AJ Tracey	
18 July	"Thiago"	Dave & AJ Tracey	Tropics	
25 July	"Ladbroke Grove"	AJ Tracey	AJ Tracey	
1 August	"Ladbroke Grove"	AJ Tracey	AJ Tracey	
8 August	"Ladbroke Grove"	AJ Tracey	AJ Tracey	
15 August	"Ladbroke Grove"	AJ Tracey	AJ Tracey	
22 August	"Ladbroke Grove"	AJ Tracey	AJ Tracey	
29 August	"Ladbroke Grove"	AJ Tracey	AJ Tracey	
5 September	"Ladbroke Grove"	AJ Tracey	AJ Tracey	
12 September	"Ladbroke Grove"	AJ Tracey	AJ Tracey	
19 September	"Ladbroke Grove"	AJ Tracey	AJ Tracey	
26 September	"Ladbroke Grove"	AJ Tracey	AJ Tracey	
3 October	"Ladbroke Grove"	AJ Tracey	AJ Tracey	
10 October	"Ladbroke Grove"	AJ Tracey	AJ Tracey	
17 October	"Ladbroke Grove"	AJ Tracey	AJ Tracey	
24 October	"Ladbroke Grove"	AJ Tracey	AJ Tracey	
31 October	"Ladbroke Grove"	AJ Tracey	AJ Tracey	
7 November	"Ladbroke Grove"	AJ Tracey	AJ Tracey	
14 November	"Ladbroke Grove"	AJ Tracey	AJ Tracey	
21 November	"Down Like That"	KSI, Rick Ross, Lil Baby and S-X	BMG	
28 November	"Down Like That"	KSI, Rick Ross, Lil Baby and S-X	BMG	
5 December	"Down Like That"	KSI, Rick Ross, Lil Baby and S-X	BMG	
12 December	"Merry Xmas Everybody"	Slade	BMG	
19 December	"Merry Xmas Everybody"	Slade	BMG	
26 December ^{[a]}	"I Love Sausage Rolls"	LadBaby	Frtyfve	

== Number-one indie artists ==
Position	Artist	Weeks at number one
1	AJ Tracey	20
2	Wiley	10
3	Freya Ridings	6
4	Lauv	4
4	Troye Sivan	4
5	KSI	3
6	Cadet	2
6	Deno Driz	2
6	Slade	2
7	Bugzy Malone	1
7	Dave	1
7	East 17	1
7	Blueface	1
7	Skepta	1
7	J Hus	1
7	LadBaby	1

== See also ==
- List of UK Dance Singles Chart number ones of 2019
- List of UK R&B Singles Chart number ones of 2019
- List of UK Rock & Metal Singles Chart number ones of 2019
- List of UK Independent Albums Chart number ones of 2019
