= List of UK Dance Albums Chart number ones of 2019 =

These are the Official Charts Company's UK Dance Albums Chart number ones of 2019. The chart week runs from Friday to Thursday with the chart-date given as the following Thursday.

== Chart history ==
Issue date	Album	Artist(s)	Record label	Ref.
3 January	Trance Nation	Various artists	Ministry of Sound	
10 January	I Love 90's	Various artists	Ministry of Sound	
17 January	The Workout Mix 2019	Various artists	UMOD	
24 January	I Love 90's	Various artists	Ministry of Sound	
31 January	I Love 90's	Various artists	Ministry of Sound	
7 February	Toast to Our Differences	Rudimental	Asylum	
14 February	I Love 90's	Various artists	Ministry of Sound	
21 February	I Love 90's	Various artists	Ministry of Sound	
28 February	I Love 90's	Various artists	Ministry of Sound	
7 March	Anjunadeep 10 - Mixed By James	Various artists	Anjunadeep	
14 March	The Fat of the Land	The Prodigy	XL	
21 March	Their Law: The Singles 1990–2005	The Prodigy	XL	
28 March	To Believe	The Cinematic Orchestra	Ninja Tune	
4 April	I Love 90's	Various artists	Ministry of Sound	
11 April	I Love 90's	Various artists	Ministry of Sound	
18 April	I Love 90's	Various artists	Ministry of Sound	
25 April	No Geography	The Chemical Brothers	Virgin	
2 May	Back to the Old Skool - Happy Hardcore	Various artists	Ministry of Sound	
9 May	Back to the Old Skool - Happy Hardcore	Various artists	Ministry of Sound	
16 May	I Love 90's	Various artists	Ministry of Sound	
23 May	100% Clubland Classix	Various artists	UMOD	
30 May	100% Clubland Classix	Various artists	UMOD	
6 June	100% Clubland Classix	Various artists	UMOD	
13 June	Rtrn II Jungle	Chase & Status	Virgin	
20 June	Love Island - Pool Party 2019	Various artists	Ministry of Sound	
27 June	Love Island - Pool Party 2019	Various artists	Ministry of Sound	
4 July	I Love Summer - Anthems	Various artists	Ministry of Sound	
11 July	Love Island - Pool Party 2019	Various artists	Ministry of Sound	
18 July	Love Island - Pool Party 2019	Various artists	Ministry of Sound	
25 July	Love Island - Pool Party 2019	Various artists	Ministry of Sound	
1 August	Love Island - Pool Party 2019	Various artists	Ministry of Sound	
8 August	Love Island - Pool Party 2019	Various artists	Ministry of Sound	
15 August	I Love 00's	Various artists	Ministry of Sound	
22 August	I Love 90's	Various artists	Ministry of Sound	
29 August	I Love 90's	Various artists	Ministry of Sound	
5 September	Mezzanine	Massive Attack	Virgin	
12 September	Defected Pts Most Rated Ibiza 2019	Various artists	Defected	
19 September	Snacks	Jax Jones	Polydor	
26 September	Dance Floor Anthems	Various artists	Crimson	
3 October	I Love 90's	Various artists	Ministry of Sound	
10 October	I Love 90's	Various artists	Ministry of Sound	
17 October	I Love 90's	Various artists	Ministry of Sound	
24 October	Throwback Trance	Various artists	Ministry of Sound	
31 October	Crush	Floating Points	Ninja Tune	
7 November	Balance	Armin van Buuren	Armada	
14 November	The Annual 2020	Various artists	Ministry of Sound	
21 November	The Annual 2020	Various artists	Ministry of Sound	
28 November	The Annual 2020	Various artists	Ministry of Sound	
5 December	100% Clubland Trance	Various artists	UMOD	
12 December	Chilled Classics	Pete Tong, The Heritage Orchestra & Jules Buckley	UMOD	
19 December	Chilled Classics	Pete Tong, The Heritage Orchestra & Jules Buckley	UMOD	
26 December	Chilled Classics	Pete Tong, The Heritage Orchestra & Jules Buckley	UMOD	

== See also ==
- List of UK Albums Chart number ones of 2019
- List of UK Dance Singles Chart number ones of 2019
- List of UK Album Downloads Chart number ones of 2019
- List of UK Independent Albums Chart number ones of 2019
- List of UK R&B Albums Chart number ones of 2019
- List of UK Rock & Metal Albums Chart number ones of 2019
- List of UK Compilation Chart number ones of the 2010s
