= List of UK Country Albums Chart number ones of 2014 =

These are the Official Charts Company's UK Country Albums Chart number ones of 2014. The chart week runs from Friday to Thursday with the chart-date given as the following Thursday. Chart positions are based the multi-metric consumption of country music in the United Kingdom, blending traditional album sales, track equivalent albums, and streaming equivalent albums. The chart contains 20 positions.

In the iteration of the chart dated 5 January, Kacey Musgraves' debut album Same Trailer Different Park spent its tenth nonconsecutive week at number one, having last reached the top spot in November 2013. It would return to the chart peak in July and September of 2014, spending a total of 12 weeks at number one. Out Among the Stars, a posthumous album from legendary singer-songwriter Johnny Cash following his death in 2013, debuted at number one on the chart on 6 April, and held the position for fifteen consecutive weeks, the most of the year. British duo Ward Thomas spent five weeks at the top spot with their debut album From Where We Stand, before being displaced by Brad Paisley's Mud on the Tires which went on to spend three weeks at the chart summit. Lady Antebellum's 747 and Garth Brooks' comeback album Man Against Machine rounded out the year with six weeks each at number one. Other artists who spent multiple weeks at number one include Sheryl Crow, whose first official country album Feels Like Home held the top spot for three weeks, and Billie Joe Armstrong and Norah Jones, Rosanne Cash, and Tim McGraw each reach the summit for two weeks respectively. The final number one of the year was Lady Antebellum's 747.

== Chart history ==
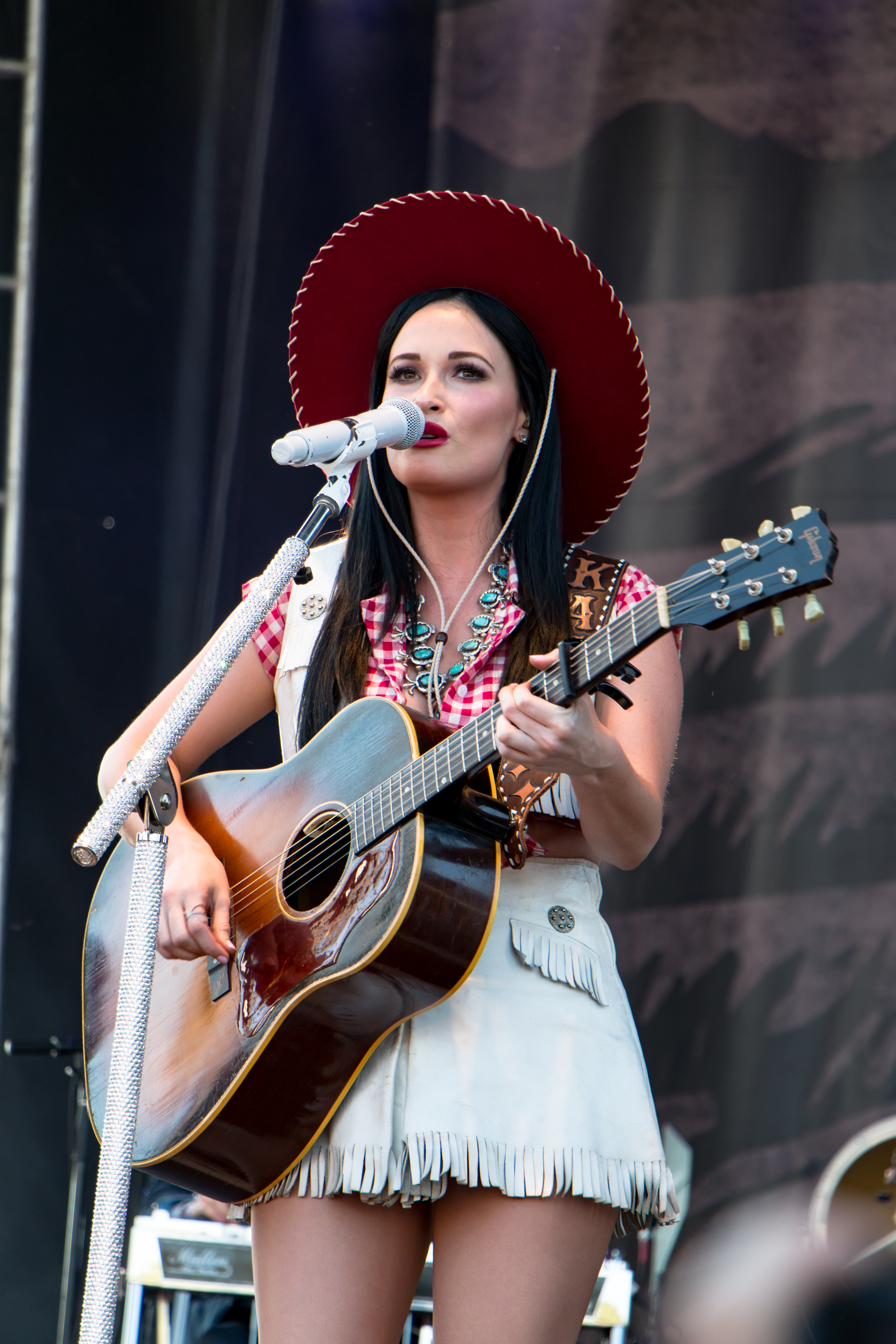
Kacey Musgraves spent three weeks at number one with her debut album Same Trailer Different Park.

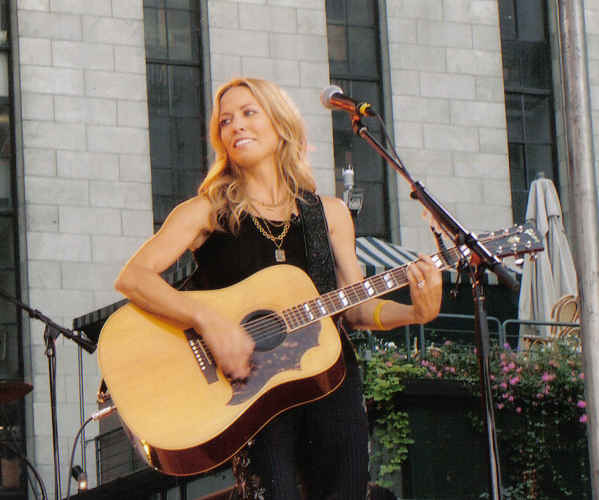
Though she has always incorporated elements of the genre into her music, Feels Like Home was Sheryl Crow's first official country album, and reached the top spot for three weeks throughout the year.

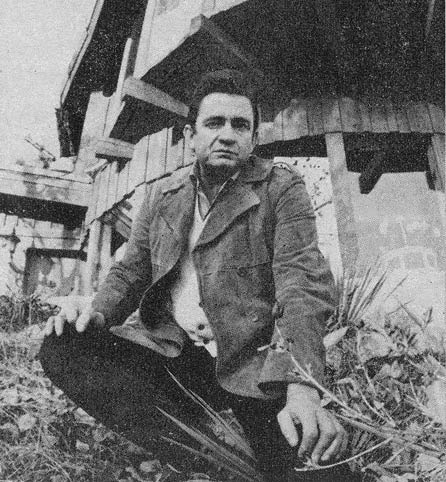
Out Among the Stars, a posthumous album from Johnny Cash, spent a leading fifteen weeks at number one.

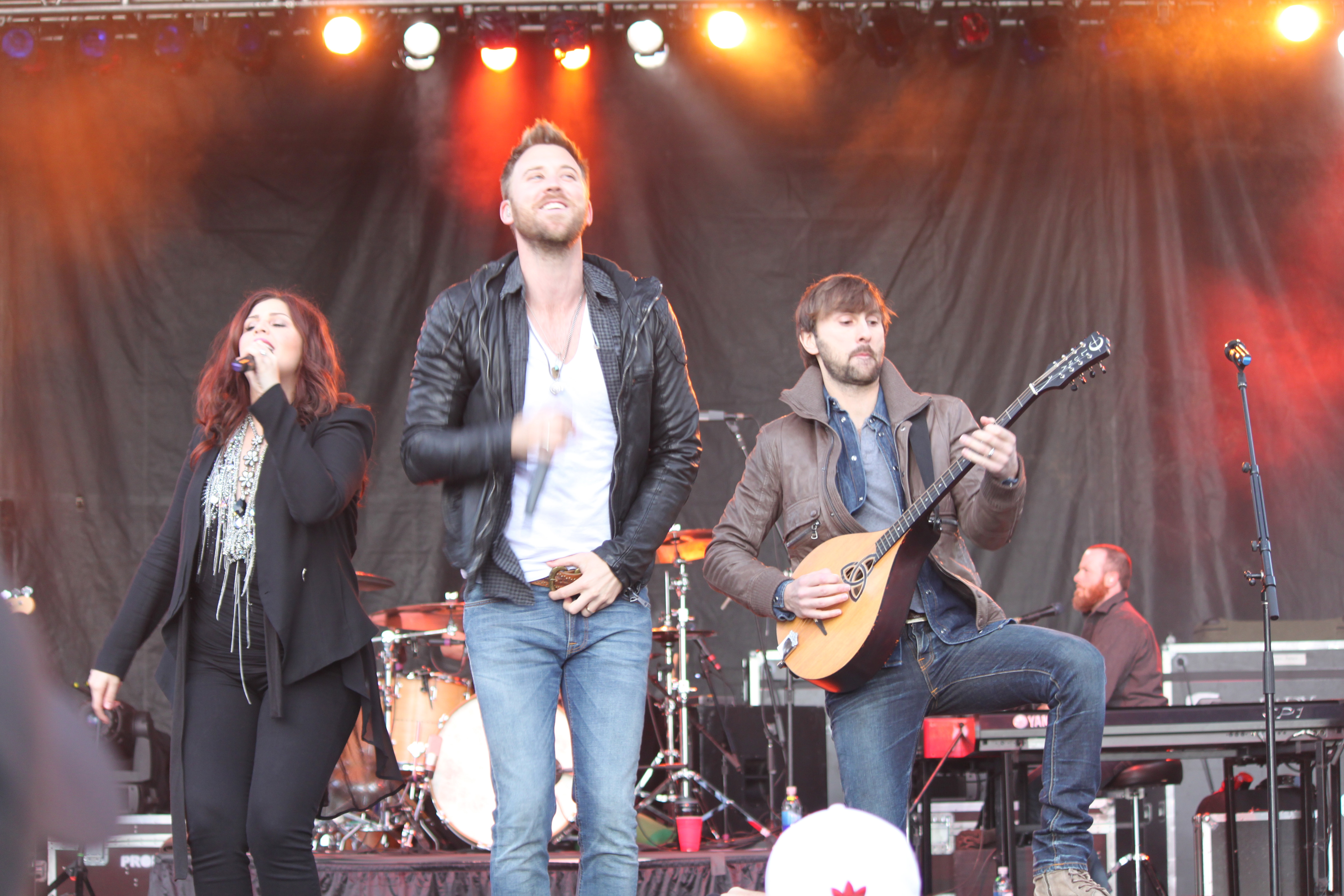
747 became Lady Antebellum's fifth UK number one, and spent six weeks in the top spot.

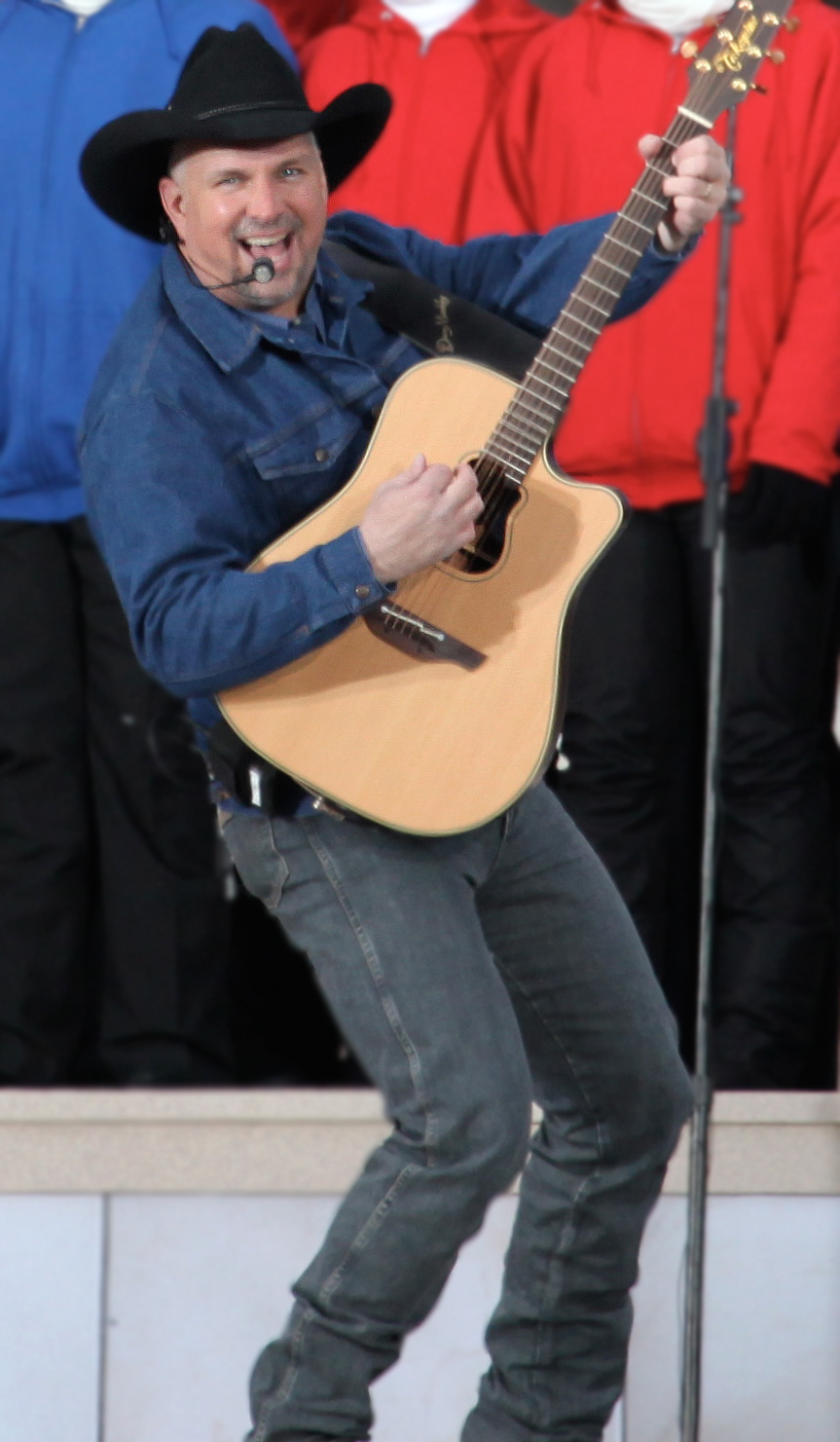
Garth Brooks' comeback album Man Against Machine held the number one spot for six consecutive weeks.

Issue date	Album	Artist(s)	Record label	Ref.
5 January	Same Trailer Different Park	Kacey Musgraves	Decca	
12 January	Foreverly	Billie Joe Armstrong and Norah Jones	Warner Bros.	
19 January	Foreverly	Billie Joe Armstrong and Norah Jones	Warner Bros.	
26 January	Uncovered	Beth Nielsen Chapman	BNC	
2 February	Feels Like Home	Sheryl Crow	Warner Bros.	
9 February	Feels Like Home	Sheryl Crow	Warner Bros.	
16 February	The River & the Thread	Rosanne Cash	Decca	
23 February	The Whippoorwill	Blackberry Smoke	Earache	
2 March	The River & the Thread	Rosanne Cash	Decca	
9 March	The Outsiders	Eric Church	Decca	
16 March	Reflections	Don Williams	Welk	
23 March	Riser	Dierks Bentley	Decca	
30 March	Feels Like Home	Sheryl Crow	Warner Bros.	
6 April	Out Among the Stars	Johnny Cash	Columbia	
13 April	Out Among the Stars	Johnny Cash	Columbia	
20 April	Out Among the Stars	Johnny Cash	Columbia	
27 April	Out Among the Stars	Johnny Cash	Columbia	
4 May	Out Among the Stars	Johnny Cash	Columbia	
11 May	Out Among the Stars	Johnny Cash	Columbia	
18 May	Out Among the Stars	Johnny Cash	Columbia	
25 May	Out Among the Stars	Johnny Cash	Columbia	
1 June	Out Among the Stars	Johnny Cash	Columbia	
8 June	Out Among the Stars	Johnny Cash	Columbia	
15 June	Out Among the Stars	Johnny Cash	Columbia	
22 June	Out Among the Stars	Johnny Cash	Columbia	
29 June	Out Among the Stars	Johnny Cash	Columbia	
6 July	Out Among the Stars	Johnny Cash	Columbia	
13 July	Same Trailer Different Park	Kacey Musgraves	Decca	
20 July	Out Among the Stars	Johnny Cash	Columbia	
27 July	From Where We Stand	Ward Thomas	WTW	
3 August	From Where We Stand	Ward Thomas	WTW	
10 August	From Where We Stand	Ward Thomas	WTW	
17 August	From Where We Stand	Ward Thomas	WTW	
24 August	From Where We Stand	Ward Thomas	WTW	
31 August	Moonshine in the Trunk	Brad Paisley	Arista Nashville	
7 September	Moonshine in the Trunk	Brad Paisley	Arista Nashville	
14 September	Moonshine in the Trunk	Brad Paisley	Arista Nashville	
21 September	Same Trailer Different Park	Kacey Musgraves	Decca	
28 September	Sundown Heaven Town	Tim McGraw	Big Machine	
5 October	Sundown Heaven Town	Tim McGraw	Big Machine	
12 October	747	Lady Antebellum	Decca	
19 October	747	Lady Antebellum	Decca	
26 October	747	Lady Antebellum	Decca	
2 November	747	Lady Antebellum	Decca	
9 November	747	Lady Antebellum	Decca	
16 November	Man Against Machine	Garth Brooks	RCA	
23 November	Man Against Machine	Garth Brooks	RCA	
30 November	Man Against Machine	Garth Brooks	RCA	
7 December	Man Against Machine	Garth Brooks	RCA	
14 December	Man Against Machine	Garth Brooks	RCA	
21 December	Man Against Machine	Garth Brooks	RCA	
28 December	747	Lady Antebellum	Decca	

== Most weeks at number one ==
Weeks at number one	Artist
15	Johnny Cash
6	Garth Brooks
6	Lady Antebellum
5	Ward Thomas
3	Brad Paisley
3	Kacey Musgraves
3	Sheryl Crow
2	Billie Joe Armstrong and Norah Jones
2	Rosanne Cash
2	Tim McGraw

== See also ==
- List of UK Albums Chart number ones of 2014
- List of UK Dance Singles Chart number ones of 2014
- List of UK Album Downloads Chart number ones of 2014
- List of UK Independent Albums Chart number ones of 2014
- List of UK R&B Albums Chart number ones of 2014
- List of UK Rock & Metal Albums Chart number ones of 2014
- List of UK Compilation Chart number ones of the 2010s
