= Psych Out! =

Single by AJ Tracey

from the album AJ Tracey
- Released: 17 January 2019
- Genre: Cloud rap
- Length: 2:56
- Label: Self-released
- Songwriter(s): Ché Grant
- Producer(s): Rex Kudo; Charlie Handsome

AJ Tracey singles chronology
"Doing It" (2018)	"Psych Out!" (2019)	"Necklace" (2019)

"Psych Out!" is a song by British rapper AJ Tracey. It was released independently as a single on 17 January 2019, peaking at number 18 on the UK chart. The song was produced by Rex Kudo and Charlie Handsome.

In September 2019, the British Phonographic Industry certified the song as Silver for exceeding chart sales of 200,000.

== Track listing ==
Digital download
No.	Title	Length
1.	"Psych Out!"	2:56

== Charts ==
Chart (2019)	Peak position
UK Indie (OCC)	3
UK Hip Hop/R&B (OCC)	9
UK Singles (OCC)	18

== Certifications ==
Region	Certification	Certified units/sales
United Kingdom (BPI)	Silver	200,000^{‡}
^{‡} Sales+streaming figures based on certification alone.
