= List of UK Independent Albums Chart number ones of 2019 =

These are the Official Charts Company's UK Independent Albums Chart number ones of 2019.

== Chart history ==
Key
†	Best-selling indie album of the year

Issue date	Album	Artist(s)	Record label	Ref.
4 January	In Harmony	Aled Jones & Russell Watson	BMG	
11 January	Farewell Album	The Searchers	Sanctuary	
18 January	Farewell Album	The Searchers	Sanctuary	
25 January	Please Remain Seated	Thunder	BMG	
1 February	Reimagines the Eighties	Trevor Horn	BMG	
8 February	Five	White Lies	PIAS Recordings	
15 February	Bobbie Gentry's Delta Sweete Revisited	Mercury Rev	Bella Union	
22 February	Head Above Water	Avril Lavigne	BMG	
1 March	Eton Alive	Sleaford Mods	Extreme Eating	
8 March	The Gold Collection	Daniel O'Donnell	Crimson	
15 March	Still on My Mind	Dido	BMG	
22 March	Singing to Strangers	Jack Savoretti	BMG	
29 March	Singing to Strangers	Jack Savoretti	BMG	
5 April	Singing to Strangers	Jack Savoretti	BMG	
12 April	Out of the Blue	Mike + The Mechanics	BMG	
19 April	Map of the Soul: Persona	BTS	Big Hit	
26 April	Map of the Soul: Persona	BTS	Big Hit	
3 May	Reckless & Me	Kiefer Sutherland	BMG	
10 May	End of Suffering	Frank Carter & The Rattlesnakes	International Death Cult	
17 May	Flesh & Blood	Whitesnake	Frontiers	
24 May	I Am Easy to Find	The National	4AD	
31 May	California Son	Morrissey	BMG	
7 June	Further	Richard Hawley	BMG	
14 June	Office Politics	Divine Comedy	Divine Comedy	
21 June	Singing to Strangers	Jack Savoretti	BMG	
28 June	Lexicon	Will Young	Cooking Vinyl	
5 July	Gold	Hank Marvin	Crimson	
12 July	Gold	Hank Marvin	Crimson	
19 July	Gold	Hank Marvin	Crimson	
26 July	Freya Ridings	Freya Ridings	Good Soldier	
2 August	Freya Ridings	Freya Ridings	Good Soldier	
9 August	Freya Ridings	Freya Ridings	Good Soldier	
16 August	Tallulah	Feeder	Believe	
23 August	This Is Not a Safe Place	Ride	Wichita Recordings	
30 August	From Here	New World Army	EarMUSIC	
6 September	I, I	Bon Iver	Jagjaguwar	
13 September	Backbone	Status Quo	EarMUSIC	
20 September	Beneath the Eyrie	Pixies	Infectious	
27 September	Gold	Belinda Carlisle	Crimson	
4 October	In Cauda Venenum	Opeth	Nuclear Blast	
11 October	Live in the City of Angels	Simple Minds	BMG	
18 October	Metal Galaxy	Babymetal	EarMUSIC	
25 October	Walk the Sky	Alter Bridge	Napalm	
1 November	The Best of Me	Rick Astley	BMG	
8 November	Back In Harmony	Aled Jones & Russell Watson	BMG	
15 November	Ghosteen	Nick Cave and the Bad Seeds	Ghosteen	
22 November	Here's to Christmas	Chris Kamara	So What	
29 November	At Last	Luke Evans	BMG	
6 December	At Last	Luke Evans	BMG	
13 December	At Last	Luke Evans	BMG	
20 December	Back In Harmony	Aled Jones & Russell Watson	BMG	
27 December	At Last	Luke Evans	BMG	

== See also ==
- List of UK Rock & Metal Albums Chart number ones of 2019
- List of UK Album Downloads Chart number ones of 2019
- List of UK Dance Albums Chart number ones of 2019
- List of UK R&B Albums Chart number ones of 2019
- List of UK Independent Singles Chart number ones of 2019
