= Invitation (Ward Thomas album) =

Studio album by Ward Thomas
- Released: 9 October 2020
- Recorded: 2020
- Genre: Country Pop
- Length: 44:18
- Label: WTW Music
- Producer: Martin Terefe; Jimmy Hogarth

Ward Thomas chronology
Restless Minds (2019)	Invitation (2020)

Singles from Invitation
- 1. "Sweet Time" Released: 7 August 2020; 2. "Meant To Be Me" Released: 15 September 2020; 3. "Someday" Released: 1 October 2020

Invitation is the fourth studio album by British modern country-pop music duo Ward Thomas, released on 9 October 2020 by Sony Music/WTW Music. The album entered the UK Albums Chart at number 29.

== Writing ==
The album was written during the national lockdown instituted by UK Prime Minister Boris Johnson during the COVID-19 pandemic, during 2020. The songs were recorded by the duo at their home, and sent to producer Jonathan Quarmby.

== Singles ==
The first single, "Sweet Time", was released in summer 2020. It was followed by "Meant to Be Me" and "Someday", released in quick succession in the weeks leading up to the album's release.

== Reception ==
The album was reviewed in Evening Standard and The Irish News.

== Track listing ==
No.	Title	Writer(s)	Producer(s)	Length
1.	"Sweet Time"	Lizzy Ward Thomas; Catherine Ward Thomas; Rebekah Powell; Jessica Sharman	Johnathan Quarmby	3:13
2.	"Don't Be a Stranger"	L. Ward Thomas; C. Ward Thomas; Fiona Bevan; Hight	Hight	3:18
3.	"Open Your Mind"	L. Ward Thomas; C. Ward Thomas; Cheyenne Medders; Powell	Quarmby	2:56
4.	"Someday"	L. Ward Thomas; C. Ward Thomas; Joe Hammel; Powell	Quarmby	3:24
5.	"Meant to Be Me"	L. Ward Thomas; C. Ward Thomas; Joe Ginsberg; Emily Reid	Ginsberg	3:08
6.	"Dear Me"	L. Ward Thomas; C. Ward Thomas; Powell; Sharman	Medders	1:48
7.	"Hold Space"	L. Ward Thomas; C. Ward Thomas; Powell; Sharman	Quarmby	2:38
8.	"Wait Up"	L. Ward Thomas; C. Ward Thomas; Powell; Sharman	Quarmby	3:01
9.	"My Favourite Poison"	L. Ward Thomas; C. Ward Thomas; Jennifer Ann Keller	Nick Davis; Ed Harcourt	3:43
10.	"Painted Legacy"	L. Ward Thomas; C. Ward Thomas; Powell; Poe	Oskar Winberg	3:37
11.	"If There Were Words"	L. Ward Thomas; C. Ward Thomas; Medders; Powell	Medders	3:05
12.	"Halfway" (James Blunt featuring Ward Thomas)	James Blunt; Cleo Tighe; Pete Kelleher; Ben Kohn; Tom Barnes	TMS	3:16
13.	"Human (Live from Wembley)" (Jack Savoretti featuring Ward Thomas)	Brandon Flowers; Dave Keuning; Mark Stoermer; Ronnie Vannucci, Jr.	Iain Graham	3:11
14.	"Landslide"	Stevie Nicks	Winberg	3:18

== Charts ==
Chart performance for Invitation
Chart (2020)	Peak position
Scottish Albums (OCC)	10
UK Albums (OCC)	29
UK Country Albums (OCC)	2

== Release history ==
Region	Release date	Format	Label
United Kingdom	9 October 2020	CD/download/double vinyl	WTW Music
