= Ride Me Back Home =

Studio album by Willie Nelson
- Released: June 21, 2019
- Genre: Country
- Length: 43:20
- Label: Legacy
- Producer: Buddy Cannon

Willie Nelson chronology
My Way (2018)	Ride Me Back Home (2019)	First Rose of Spring (2020)

Singles from Ride Me Back Home
- 1. "Ride Me Back Home" Released: April 26, 2019; 2. "My Favorite Picture of You" Released: May 17, 2019; 3. "Come on Time" Released: May 31, 2019; 4. "It's Hard to Be Humble" Released: June 14, 2019; 5. "Immigrant Eyes" Released: June 24, 2019; 6. "Seven Year Itch" Released: June 27, 2019

Professional ratings
Aggregate scores
Source	Rating
Metacritic	77/100
Review scores
Source	Rating

Ride Me Back Home is the 69th solo studio album by American country music singer-songwriter Willie Nelson. It was released on June 21, 2019, by Legacy Recordings. Its title track earned Nelson his ninth Grammy Award, winning in the category Best Country Solo Performance.

== Background ==
During an interview on Sirius XM Satellite Radio, aired on April 13, 2019 Nelson announced the release of the album. The material consists mostly of original writings by producer Buddy Cannon and Nelson. The title track was written by Sonny Throckmorton. Nelson decided to record "Ride Me Back Home" for his own advocacy for horses. On Cannon's suggestion, a revisited version of "Stay Away from Lonely Places" from 1972's The Words Don't Fit the Picture was included.

The first single, its title track, was released on April 26, 2019. Ride Me Back Home completed the "Mortality Trilogy" of Nelson, complementing God's Problem Child and Last Man Standing.

== Commercial performance ==
Ride Me Back Home debuted at No. 2 on Billboard's Top Country Albums with 19,000 album equivalent units. The album has sold 58,900 copies in the United States as of March 2020.

== Track listing ==
No.	Title	Writer(s)	Length
1.	"Ride Me Back Home"	Lucinda Hinton; Joe Manual; Debby Throckmorton; Sonny Throckmorton	3:35
2.	"Come on Time"	Nelson; Buddy Cannon	2:55
3.	"My Favorite Picture of You"	Guy Clark	3:55
4.	"Seven Year Itch"	Nelson; Cannon	3:23
5.	"Immigrant Eyes"	Clark	4:34
6.	"Stay Away from Lonely Places"	Nelson; Don Bowman	3:59
7.	"Just the Way You Are"	Billy Joel	4:35
8.	"One More Song to Write"	Nelson; Cannon	3:56
9.	"Nobody's Listening"	Skip Denenberg; Dan “Bee” Spears	4:51
10.	"It's Hard to Be Humble" (with Lukas Nelson and Micah Nelson)	Mac Davis	3:47
11.	"Maybe I Should've Been Listening"	Buzz Rabin	3:50
Total length:			43:20

== Charts ==
=== Weekly charts ===
Chart (2019)	Peak position
Australian Albums (ARIA)	138
Austrian Albums (Ö3 Austria)	18
German Albums (Offizielle Top 100)	54
Scottish Albums (OCC)	18
Swiss Albums (Schweizer Hitparade)	18
US Billboard 200	18
US Top Country Albums (Billboard)	2

=== Year-end charts ===
Chart (2019)	Position
US Top Country Albums (Billboard)	97

== Sources ==
- Doyle, Patrick (April 26, 2019). "Willie Nelson Details His New Album 'Ride Me Back Home'". Rolling Stone. Wenner Media LLC.
- Sodomsky, Sam (2019). "Willie Nelson Announces New Album Ride Me Back Home, Shares New Song: Listen". Pitchfork. Pitchfork Media.
