= List of UK R&B Singles Chart number ones of 2019 =

Number one singles of 2019 on British music chart

The logo of the Official Charts Company, responsible for compiling all of the official music charts in the United Kingdom, including the R&B singles chart.

The UK R&B Singles Chart is a weekly chart that ranks the 40 biggest-selling singles and albums that are classified in the R&B genre in the United Kingdom. The chart is compiled by the Official Charts Company, and is based on both physical, and digital sales.

The following are the songs which have topped the UK R&B Singles Chart in 2019.

== Number-one singles ==
Chart date (week ending)	Song	Artist(s)	Record label	References
3 January	"Sunflower"	Post Malone featuring Swae Lee	Republic	
10 January	"Sunflower"	Post Malone featuring Swae Lee	Republic	
17 January	"Wow"	Post Malone	Republic	
24 January	"Wow"	Post Malone	Republic	
31 January	"Wow"	Post Malone	Republic	
7 February	"Wow"	Post Malone	Republic	
14 February	"Don't Call Me Up"	Mabel	Polydor	
21 February	"Don't Call Me Up"	Mabel	Polydor	
28 February	"Don't Call Me Up"	Mabel	Polydor	
7 March	"Don't Call Me Up"	Mabel	Polydor	
14 March	"Don't Call Me Up"	Mabel	Polydor	
21 March	"Don't Call Me Up"	Mabel	Polydor	
28 March	"Don't Call Me Up"	Mabel	Polydor	
4 April	"Don't Call Me Up"	Mabel	Polydor	
11 April	"Don't Call Me Up"	Mabel	Polydor	
18 April	"Don't Call Me Up"	Mabel	Polydor	
25 April	"Keisha & Becky"	Russ and Tion Wayne	Virgin	
2 May	"Don't Call Me Up"	Mabel	Polydor	
9 May ^{[a]}	"Vossi Bop"	Stormzy	Merky	
16 May ^{[a]}	"Vossi Bop"	Stormzy	Merky	
23 May	"Vossi Bop"	Stormzy	Merky	
30 May	"Vossi Bop"	Stormzy	Merky	
6 June	"Vossi Bop"	Stormzy	Merky	
13 June	"Vossi Bop"	Stormzy	Merky	
20 June	"Old Town Road"	Lil Nas X	Lil Nas X	
27 June	"Old Town Road"	Lil Nas X	Lil Nas X	
4 July	"Old Town Road"	Lil Nas X	Lil Nas X	
11 July	"Old Town Road"	Lil Nas X	Lil Nas X	
18 July	"Old Town Road"	Lil Nas X	Lil Nas X	
25 July	"Old Town Road"	Lil Nas X	Lil Nas X	
1 August	"Old Town Road"	Lil Nas X	Lil Nas X	
8 August	"Old Town Road"	Lil Nas X	Lil Nas X	
15 August	"Old Town Road"	Lil Nas X	Lil Nas X	
22 August	"Old Town Road"	Lil Nas X	Lil Nas X	
29 August	"Ladbroke Grove"	AJ Tracey	AJ Tracey	
5 September ^{[a]}	"Take Me Back to London"	Ed Sheeran and Stormzy	Asylum	
12 September ^{[a]}	"Take Me Back to London"	Ed Sheeran and Stormzy	Asylum	
19 September ^{[a]}	"Take Me Back to London"	Ed Sheeran and Stormzy	Asylum	
26 September ^{[a]}	"Take Me Back to London"	Ed Sheeran and Stormzy	Asylum	
3 October ^{[a]}	"Take Me Back to London"	Ed Sheeran and Stormzy	Asylum	
10 October	"Take Me Back to London"	Ed Sheeran and Stormzy	Asylum	
17 October	"Highest in the Room"	Travis Scott	Cactus Jack/Epic/Grand Hustle	
24 October	"Take Me Back to London"	Ed Sheeran and Stormzy	Asylum	
31 October ^{[b]}	"Circles"	Post Malone	Republic	
7 November	"Circles"	Post Malone	Republic	
14 November	"Circles"	Post Malone	Republic	
21 November	"Must Be"	J Hus	Black Butter	
28 November	"Good as Hell"	Lizzo	Atlantic	
5 December	"Own It"	Stormzy, Ed Sheeran and Burna Boy	Atlantic/Merky	
12 December	"Own It"	Stormzy, Ed Sheeran and Burna Boy	Atlantic/Merky	
19 December	"Own It"	Stormzy, Ed Sheeran and Burna Boy	Atlantic/Merky	
26 December ^{[b]}	"Own It"	Stormzy, Ed Sheeran and Burna Boy	Atlantic/Merky	

== Notes ==
- ^{a} - The single was simultaneously number one on the UK Singles Chart.
- ^{b} - The artist was simultaneously number one on the R&B Albums Chart.

== See also ==
- List of UK Singles Chart number ones of 2019
- List of UK R&B Albums Chart number ones of 2019
- List of UK Dance Singles Chart number ones of 2019
