= Butterflies (AJ Tracey song) =

Single by AJ Tracey featuring Not3s

from the album AJ Tracey
- Released: 30 May 2018
- Recorded: 2018
- Genre: Soca; dancehall
- Length: 3:44
- Label: Self-released
- Songwriters: Ché Grant; Lukman Odunaike
- Producer: Nyge

AJ Tracey singles chronology
"Mimi" (2018)	"Butterflies" (2018)	"3AM" (2018)

Not3s singles chronology
"M3 Not You" (2018)	"Butterflies" (2018)

"Butterflies" is a single by British rapper AJ Tracey featuring British rapper Not3s. It was self-released on 30 May 2018 for digital download and streaming. The single appears on Tracey's self-titled debut album (2019). The song, produced by Nyge, became Tracey's first song to chart, peaking at number 19 on UK Singles Chart, and receiving a silver certification by British Phonographic Industry.

== Background ==
Speaking to The Fader about "Butterflies", AJ Tracey stated: "Africa's really well represented now, so hold tight with my African friends but my culture isn't represented. It's all cool listening to the afrobeats and afroswing, whatever you want to call it, but where is the dancehall, the soca, you know what I'm saying? There's none of this [in U.K. music]. I just wanted to showcase it a bit."

== Music video ==
The music video was released on 30 May 2018. It was directed by Tracey himself along with Mornix. The video was shot in Trinidad and Tobago in February 2018.

== Commercial performance ==
"Butterflies" entered at number 24 on the UK Singles Chart for the chart dated 8 June 2018, peaking at number 19 the following week. The song became AJ Tracey's first top 40 entry on the chart. "Butterflies" has also charted at number 7 on the UK R&B Chart and number 2 on the UK Independent Chart.

== Critical reception ==
Robin Murray of Clash described the song as a "breezy summer feel, with AJ Tracey slackening off on the velocity but ratcheting up the style."

== Charts ==
=== Weekly charts ===
Chart (2018)	Peak position
Ireland (IRMA)	98
UK Singles (OCC)	19
UK Indie (OCC)	2
UK Hip Hop/R&B (OCC)	7

=== Year-end charts ===
Chart (2018)	Position
UK Singles (Official Charts Company)	89

== Certifications ==
Region	Certification	Certified units/sales
United Kingdom (BPI)	2× Platinum	1,200,000^{‡}
^{‡} Sales+streaming figures based on certification alone.
