= My Way (Willie Nelson album) =

Studio album by Willie Nelson
- Released: September 14, 2018
- Studio: EastWest, Los Angeles
- Genre: Country, Traditional pop
- Length: 35:25
- Label: Legacy Recordings
- Producer: Buddy Cannon, Matt Rollings

Willie Nelson chronology
Last Man Standing (2018)	My Way (2018)	Ride Me Back Home (2019)

Singles from My Way
- 1. "Summer Wind" Released: July 19, 2018; 2. "I'll Be Around" Released: August 24, 2018; 3. "One for My Baby (And One More for the Road)" Released: September 10, 2018

Professional ratings
Aggregate scores
Source	Rating
Metacritic	76/100
Review scores
Source	Rating
AllMusic	3.5/5 stars
American Songwriter	4/5 stars
Rolling Stone	3.5/5 stars

My Way is the 68th solo studio album by Willie Nelson. It was released on September 14, 2018, by Legacy Recordings. The album is a tribute to Frank Sinatra, who was a close friend of Nelson's. The album received the Grammy Award for Best Traditional Pop Vocal Album, marking Nelson's 13th career Grammy win.

== Background ==
Nelson first teased the album on April 27, 2018, while promoting his album Last Man Standing in an article published by Variety, saying that the Great American Songbook "is a deep well, because good songs never die. If it was good a hundred years ago, it's still good today."

The album was formally announced on July 19, 2018. It is a collection of songs closely associated with Frank Sinatra, whom Nelson first heard at 10 years old when Sinatra joined the radio program Your Hit Parade. Nelson and Sinatra were close friends and mutual admirers of each other's work. In the 1980s, the pair performed on the same bill at the Golden Nugget in Las Vegas and appeared together in a public service announcement for the Space Foundation.

The album's first single, "Summer Wind", was released on the same day, along with its accompanying music video.

On August 24, 2018, "I'll Be Around" was released as the album's second single, with its music video premiering the same day.

The third single from the album, "One for My Baby (And One More for the Road)", was released on September 10, 2018, along with its music video.

== Track listing ==
My Way
No.	Title	Writer(s)	Length
1.	"Fly Me to the Moon"	Bart Howard	2:44
2.	"Summer Wind"	Heinz Meier, Johnny Mercer	3:23
3.	"One for My Baby (And One More for the Road)"	Harold Arlen, Mercer	3:59
4.	"A Foggy Day"	George Gershwin, Ira Gershwin	2:57
5.	"It Was a Very Good Year"	Ervin Drake	3:56
6.	"Blue Moon"	Richard Rodgers, Lorenz Hart	2:37
7.	"I'll Be Around"	Alec Wilder	2:59
8.	"Night and Day"	Cole Porter	2:48
9.	"What Is This Thing Called Love?" (featuring Norah Jones)	Porter	2:27
10.	"Young at Heart"	Johnny Richards, Carolyn Leigh	2:46
11.	"My Way"	Paul Anka, Claude François, Jacques Revaux	4:49
Total length:			35:25

== Charts ==
Chart (2018)	Peak position
Austrian Albums (Ö3 Austria)	58
Scottish Albums (OCC)	31
Swiss Albums (Schweizer Hitparade)	75
