= Cartwheels (Ward Thomas album) =

2016 studio album by Ward Thomas

Studio album by Ward Thomas
- Released: 2 September 2016
- Recorded: 2016
- Genre: Country pop
- Length: 49:22
- Label: Sony Music; WTW Music
- Producer: Martin Terefe; Jimmy Hogarth

Ward Thomas chronology
| From Where We Stand (2014) | Cartwheels (2016) | A Shorter Story (2017) |

Singles from Cartwheels
- 1. "Carry You Home" Released: 10 June 2016; 2. "Guilty Flowers" Released: 29 July 2016; 3. "Cartwheels" Released: 28 October 2016; 4. "Boomerang" Released: 3 February 2017; 5. "Material" Released: 5 May 2017

Cartwheels is the second studio album by British modern country-pop music duo Ward Thomas. It was released on 2 September 2016 by Sony Music/WTW Music. The album includes the singles "Carry You Home", "Guilty Flowers", and the title track "Cartwheels". It became the first album by a UK country act to reach number one on the UK Albums Chart surpassing the previous record by The Shires. It has since gone silver in the UK. The album was produced by Martin Terefe and Jimmy Hogarth. They performed on BBC's The One Show, Children in Need Rocks for Terry Wogan and Sunday Brunch to promote the album.

== Singles ==
"Carry You Home" was released as the lead single from the album on 10 June 2016. "Guilty Flowers" was released as the second single from the album on 29 July 2016 and was added to BBC Radio 2's playlist.

"Cartwheels" was chosen as the album's third single, released on 28 October 2016 as a download bundle with a cover of the Lenny Kravitz track, "Fly Away". In December 2016, Ward Thomas announced during a show at London's Roundhouse that the fourth single release would be "Boomerang". Ward Thomas announced their fifth single as "Material", which was promoted via an interactive video in which the user controls who they watch and hear throughout.

== Track listing ==
| No. | Title | Writer(s) | Producer(s) | Length |
|---|---|---|---|---|
| 1. | "Carry You Home" | Lizzy Ward Thomas; Catherine Ward Thomas; Rebekah Powell; Jessica Sharman; Glen Scott | Martin Terefe; Jimmy Hogarth | 3:35 |
| 2. | "Almost Easy" | L. Ward Thomas; C. Ward Thomas; Powell; Sharman | Terefe; Hogarth | 3:33 |
| 3. | "Material" | L. Ward Thomas; C. Ward Thomas; Martin Terefe | Terefe; Hogarth | 3:27 |
| 4. | "Cartwheels" | L. Ward Thomas; C. Ward Thomas; Powell; Tonya Poe | Terefe; Hogarth | 3:50 |
| 5. | "Guilty Flowers" | L. Ward Thomas; C. Ward Thomas; Shelly Poole; Ben Adams | Terefe; Hogarth | 3:03 |
| 6. | "Lose Me" | L. Ward Thomas; C. Ward Thomas; Powell; Cheyenne Medders | Terefe; Hogarth | 2:42 |
| 7. | "Good on You" | L. Ward Thomas; C. Ward Thomas; Powell | Terefe; Hogarth | 3:58 |
| 8. | "When It's Not Me" | L. Ward Thomas; C. Ward Thomas; Jamie Kenney | Terefe; Hogarth | 3:41 |
| 9. | "Boomerang" | L. Ward Thomas; C. Ward Thomas; Helen Boulding; Shridhar Solanki | Terefe; Hogarth | 3:34 |
| 10. | "Dirt and Gold" | L. Ward Thomas; C. Ward Thomas; Powell; Poe | Terefe; Hogarth | 3:51 |
| 11. | "Where the Sky Is" | L. Ward Thomas; C. Ward Thomas; Powell; Sharman | Terefe; Hogarth | 3:03 |
| 12. | "Proof" | L. Ward Thomas; C. Ward Thomas; Powell; Sharman | Terefe; Hogarth | 3:16 |
| 13. | "Who I'm Not" | L. Ward Thomas; C. Ward Thomas; Powell; Sharman | Terefe; Hogarth | 3:45 |
| 14. | "Safe" | L. Ward Thomas; C. Ward Thomas; Powell | Terefe; Hogarth | 4:04 |

== Charts ==
| Chart (2016) | Peak position |
|---|---|
| UK Albums (OCC) | 1 |
| UK Album Downloads (OCC) | 3 |
| Scottish Albums (OCC) | 1 |

== Certifications ==
| Region | Certification | Certified units/sales |
|---|---|---|
| United Kingdom (BPI) | Gold | 100,000^{‡} |
^{‡} Sales+streaming figures based on certification alone.

== Release history ==
| Region | Release date | Format | Label |
|---|---|---|---|
| United Kingdom | 2 September 2016 | CD/download/double vinyl | Sony Music/WTW Music |
