= First Rose of Spring =

Studio album by Willie Nelson
- Released: July 3, 2020
- Studio: The Tracking Room (Nashville, Tennessee); UMG (Nashville); Blackbird (Nashville); Pedernales Recording (Spicewood, Texas); The Tone Dock (Nashville, Tennessee)
- Genre: Country
- Length: 41:21
- Label: Legacy
- Producer: Buddy Cannon

Willie Nelson chronology
Ride Me Back Home (2019)	First Rose of Spring (2020)	That's Life (2021)

Singles from First Rose of Spring
- 1. "First Rose of Spring" Released: February 21, 2020; 2. "Our Song" Released: March 13, 2020; 3. "I'm the Only Hell My Mama Ever Raised" Released: May 8, 2020; 4. "We Are the Cowboys" Released: June 19, 2020

First Rose of Spring is the 70th solo studio album by American singer-songwriter Willie Nelson. It was released on July 3, 2020, by Legacy Recordings. The album was produced by Buddy Cannon. The album was originally scheduled to be released on April 24, but was pushed back to July 3 due to the COVID-19 pandemic.

== Content ==
The album features eleven tracks. Nelson and Cannon co-wrote two originals for the album, while the remaining tracks include compositions by Chris Stapleton, Toby Keith and Pete Graves. The title track was written by Randy Houser, Allen Shamblin and Mack Vickery. The closing track of the album is a cover of Charles Aznavour's "Yesterday When I Was Young".

== Critical reception ==
Professional ratings
Aggregate scores
Source	Rating
Metacritic	76/100
Review scores
Source	Rating
AllMusic	3/5 stars
The Independent	4/5 stars
NME	3/5 stars

First Rose of Spring received positive review from music critics. At Metacritic, which assigns a normalized rating out of 100 to reviews from mainstream critics, the album received a score of 76 out of 100 based on six reviews, indicating "generally favorable reviews".

Peter J. Hoetjes from Glide Magazine praised the album's songwriting and use of organic instruments, saying that Nelson "willfully imbues First Rose of Spring with his own brand of bitter honesty, giving the album the sort of emotional resonance that the majority of his contemporary peers forgo in exchange for switchboard instrumentation and hollow lyricism." Writing for The Independent, Elisa Bray gave the album four out of five stars, describing it as "the work of an artist who will never grow old."

== Commercial performance ==
First Rose of Spring debuted at No. 5 on Billboard's Top Country Albums with 12,000 album equivalent units.

== Track listing ==
First Rose of Spring
No.	Title	Writer(s)	Length
1.	"First Rose of Spring"	Randy Houser; Allen Shamblin; Mark Beeson	3:41
2.	"Blue Star"	Willie Nelson; Buddy Cannon	4:35
3.	"I'll Break Out Again Tonight"	Sanger D. Shafer; A.L. "Doodle" Owens	2:49
4.	"Don't Let the Old Man In"	Toby Keith	3:09
5.	"Just Bummin' Around"	Pete Graves	3:15
6.	"Our Song"	Chris Stapleton	3:51
7.	"We Are the Cowboys"	Billy Joe Shaver	4:03
8.	"Stealing Home"	Marla Cannon-Goodman; Casey Beathard; Don Sampson	3:42
9.	"I'm the Only Hell My Mama Ever Raised"	Wayne Kemp; Bobby Borchers; Mack Vickery	4:11
10.	"Love Just Laughed"	Nelson; Cannon	4:34
11.	"Yesterday When I Was Young"	Charles Aznavour; Herbert Kretzmer	3:31
Total length:			41:21

== Personnel ==
Adapted from the album liner notes.

Performance

- Dave Angell – strings
- Monisa Angell – strings
- Jerry Bifano – strings
- Buddy Cannon – acoustic guitar, background vocals
- Melodie Cannon – background vocals
- Chad Cromwell – drums
- David Davidson – strings
- Ward Davis – background vocals
- Connie Ellisor – strings
- Alicia Enstrom – strings
- Kevin "Swine" Grantt – upright bass
- Mike Johnson – steel guitar
- Anthony La Marchina – strings
- Catherine Marx – piano, B3 organ, Wurlitzer, Rhodes
- Willie Nelson – Trigger, lead vocals
- Larry Paxton – upright bass
- Sari Reist – strings
- Mickey Raphael – harmonica
- Bobby Terry – electric guitar, acoustic guitar, steel guitar
- Kristin Wilkinson – strings
- Lonnie Wilson – drums
- Karen Winkelmann – strings

Production

- Luke Armentrout – mastering assistant
- Kevin Boettger – assistant engineer
- Buddy Cannon – production
- Tony Castle – recording, mixing
- Steve Chadie – recording
- Andrew Darby – mastering assistant
- Shannon Finnegan – production coordinator
- Michelle Freetley – assistant engineer
- Bobbi Giel – mastering assistant
- Steven Lamb – copyist
- Matt Leigh – assistant engineer
- Steve Mazur – assistant engineer
- Andrew Mendelson – mastering
- Nick Molino – assistant engineer
- Bryce Roberts – assistant engineer
- Bobby Terry – additional engineer
- Kristin Wilkinson – string arrangements

Other personnel

- Alexandra Dascalu Nelson – back cover photo
- Micah Nelson – artwork

== Charts ==
Chart performance for First Rose of Spring
Chart (2020)	Peak position
Australian Albums (ARIA)	68
Austrian Albums (Ö3 Austria)	8
Dutch Albums (Album Top 100)	50
German Albums (Offizielle Top 100)	43
Scottish Albums (OCC)	9
Swiss Albums (Schweizer Hitparade)	8
UK Albums (OCC)	76
UK Country Albums (OCC)	1
US Billboard 200	49
US Top Country Albums (Billboard)	5
