= List of UK Dance Singles Chart number ones of 2019 =

The UK Dance Singles Chart is a weekly music chart compiled in the United Kingdom by the Official Charts Company (OCC) from sales of songs in the dance music genre (house, drum and bass, dubstep, etc.) in record stores and digital downloads. The chart week runs from Friday to Thursday with the chart-date given as the following Thursday.

This is a list of the songs which were number one on the UK Dance Singles Chart during 2019.

== Chart history ==
Key
†	Best-performing dance single of the year

Chart date (week ending)	Song	Artist(s)	References
3 January	"Promises"	Calvin Harris and Sam Smith	
10 January	"Promises"	Calvin Harris and Sam Smith	
17 January	"Promises"	Calvin Harris and Sam Smith	
24 January	"Promises"	Calvin Harris and Sam Smith	
31 January	"Play"	Jax Jones and Years & Years	
7 February	"Play"	Jax Jones and Years & Years	
14 February	"Play"	Jax Jones and Years & Years	
21 February	"Play"	Jax Jones and Years & Years	
28 February	"Promises"	Calvin Harris and Sam Smith	
7 March	"Promises"	Calvin Harris and Sam Smith	
14 March	"Promises"	Calvin Harris and Sam Smith	
21 March	"Promises"	Calvin Harris and Sam Smith	
28 March	"Here with Me"	Marshmello featuring Chvrches	
4 April	"Here with Me"	Marshmello featuring Chvrches	
11 April	"Piece of Your Heart" †	Meduza and Goodboys	
18 April	"Piece of Your Heart" †	Meduza and Goodboys	
25 April	"Piece of Your Heart" †	Meduza and Goodboys	
2 May	"Piece of Your Heart" †	Meduza and Goodboys	
9 May	"Piece of Your Heart" †	Meduza and Goodboys	
16 May	"Piece of Your Heart" †	Meduza and Goodboys	
23 May	"Piece of Your Heart" †	Meduza and Goodboys	
30 May	"Piece of Your Heart" †	Meduza and Goodboys	
6 June	"Piece of Your Heart" †	Meduza and Goodboys	
13 June	"Piece of Your Heart" †	Meduza and Goodboys	
20 June	"Piece of Your Heart" †	Meduza and Goodboys	
27 June	"Piece of Your Heart" †	Meduza and Goodboys	
4 July	"Piece of Your Heart" †	Meduza and Goodboys	
11 July	"Piece of Your Heart" †	Meduza and Goodboys	
18 July	"Wish You Well"	Sigala and Becky Hill	
25 July	"Wish You Well"	Sigala and Becky Hill	
1 August	"Wish You Well"	Sigala and Becky Hill	
8 August	"Wish You Well"	Sigala and Becky Hill	
15 August	"Wish You Well"	Sigala and Becky Hill	
22 August	"Wish You Well"	Sigala and Becky Hill	
29 August	"Sorry"	Joel Corry	
5 September	"Sorry"	Joel Corry	
12 September	"Sorry"	Joel Corry	
19 September	"Sorry"	Joel Corry	
26 September	"Sorry"	Joel Corry	
3 October	"Ride It"	Regard	
10 October	"Ride It"	Regard	
17 October	"Ride It"	Regard	
24 October	"Ride It"	Regard	
31 October	"Ride It"	Regard	
7 November	"Ride It"	Regard	
14 November	"Ride It"	Regard	
21 November	"Ride It"	Regard	
28 November	"Ride It"	Regard	
5 December	"Ride It"	Regard	
12 December	"Ride It"	Regard	
19 December	"Ride It"	Regard	
26 December	"Ride It"	Regard	

- ^{a} – the single was simultaneously number-one on the singles chart.

== Number-one artists ==
Position	Artist	Weeks at number one
1	Meduza	14
1	Goodboys	14
2	Regard	13
3	Calvin Harris	8
3	Sam Smith	8
4	Sigala	6
4	Becky Hill	6
5	Joel Corry	5
6	Jax Jones	4
6	Years & Years	4
7	Marshmello	2

== See also ==
- List of number-one singles of 2019 (UK)
- List of UK Dance Albums Chart number ones of 2019
- List of UK R&B Singles Chart number ones of 2019
- List of UK Rock & Metal Singles Chart number ones of 2019
- List of UK Independent Singles Chart number ones of 2019
