= Willie and the Boys: Willie's Stash, Vol. 2 =

Studio album by Willie Nelson
- Released: October 20, 2017
- Recorded: 2011–2012
- Studio: Pedernales Recording (Spicewood, Texas)
- Genre: Country
- Length: 39:39
- Label: Legacy Recordings
- Producer: Buddy Cannon

Willie Nelson chronology
God's Problem Child (2017)	Willie and the Boys: Willie's Stash, Vol. 2 (2017)	Last Man Standing (2018)

Singles from Willie and the Boys: Willie's Stash, Vol. 2
- 1. "Mind Your Own Business" Released: September 21, 2017; 2. "I'm Movin' On" Released: October 3, 2017; 3. "My Tears Fall" Released: October 18, 2017

Willie and the Boys: Willie's Stash, Vol. 2 is a collaborative studio album by Willie Nelson and his sons Lukas and Micah. The release is the second volume of the series Willie's Stash, a collection of archival releases selected by Nelson. The material contained on the album was recorded during the sessions for the 2012 album Heroes.

The tracks consist of country standards, featuring seven songs penned by Hank Williams. It was recorded by engineer Steve Chadie at Nelson's Pedernales studio. The release was announced for October 20, 2017.

== Commercial performance ==
The album debuted at No. 19 on Billboard's Top Country Albums chart. It has sold 21,300 copies in the United States as of February 2018.

== Track listing ==
No.	Title	Writer(s)	Length
1.	"Move it on Over"	Hank Williams	3:47
2.	"Mind Your Own Business"	Williams	2:41
3.	"Healing Hands of Time"	Willie Nelson	2:32
4.	"Can I Sleep in Your Arms"	Hank Cochran	4:18
5.	"Send Me the Pillow You Dream On"	Hank Locklin	3:17
6.	"I'm So Lonesome I Could Cry"	Williams	2:41
7.	"I'm Movin' On"	Hank Snow	3:21
8.	"Your Cheatin' Heart"	Williams	2:55
9.	"My Tears Fall"	Alyssa Miller	3:28
10.	"Cold, Cold Heart"	Williams	4:28
11.	"Mansion on the Hill"	Williams, Fred Rose	3:31
12.	"Why Don’t You Love Me"	Williams	2:40

== Charts ==
Chart (2017)	Peak position
US Top Country Albums (Billboard)	19
