= A Shorter Story =

EP by Ward Thomas
- Released: 31 March 2017
- Recorded: 2017
- Genre: Country pop
- Length: 18:33
- Label: Sony Music; WTW Music
- Producer: Oskar Winberg

Ward Thomas chronology
| Cartwheels (2016) | A Shorter Story (2017) | Restless Minds (2019) |

A Shorter Story is the first extended play (EP) by British modern country-pop music duo Ward Thomas. The EP consists of five tracks which are covers of the duo's favourite pop songs reworked into their own style. Catherine and Lizzy said ’We've been playing around with cover versions as part of our acoustic Snug Sessions videos for a few years now and mostly they have gone down really well. We recorded the EP over two days and have tried to bring something new and different to each song whilst at the same time respecting the original versions. Hopefully people like them.'

== Background ==
On March 30, 2017, Ward Thomas teased the release of new material on Twitter. The band played Shine during their 2017 Cartwheels Tour.

== Track listing ==
| No. | Title | Writer(s) | Length |
|---|---|---|---|
| 1. | "The Blower's Daughter" | Damien Rice | 3:52 |
| 2. | "What Goes Around... Comes Around" | Justin Timberlake; Tim Mosley; Nate "Danja" Hills | 4:08 |
| 3. | "Shine" | Oliver Alexander Thornton; Resul Emre Turkmen; Michael Thomas "Mikey" Goldsworthy; Mark Ralph; Greg Kurstin | 3:09 |
| 4. | "WALLS" | Caleb Followill; Nathan Followill; Jared Followill; Matthew Followill | 4:13 |
| 5. | ""Better Be Home Soon"" | Neil Finn | 3:15 |
| Total length: | | | 18:33 |

== Release history ==
| Region | Date | Format | Label |
|---|---|---|---|
| United Kingdom | 31 March 2017 | Digital download | Sony Music; WTW Music |
