= List of UK R&B Albums Chart number ones of 2019 =

The logo of the Official Charts Company, responsible for compiling all of the official music charts in the United Kingdom, including the R&B albums chart.

The UK R&B Albums Chart is a weekly chart, first introduced in October 1994, that ranks the 40 biggest-selling albums that are classified in the R&B genre in the United Kingdom. The chart is compiled by the Official Charts Company, and is based on sales of CDs, downloads, vinyl and other formats over the previous seven days.

The following are the number-one albums of 2019.

== Number-one albums ==
Issue date	Album	Artist(s)	Record label	Ref.
4 January	Kamikaze	Eminem	Interscope	
11 January	Kamikaze	Eminem	Interscope	
18 January	Kamikaze	Eminem	Interscope	
25 January	Kamikaze	Eminem	Interscope	
1 February	Kamikaze	Eminem	Interscope	
8 February	Third Avenue	Fredo	Since 93	
15 February	AJ Tracey	AJ Tracey	AJ Tracey	
22 February	KOD	J.Cole	Interscope	
1 March	Big Bad	Giggs	Island	
8 March	Grey Area	Little Simz	Age 101	
15 March ^{[a]}	Psychodrama	Dave	Dave/Neighbourhood	
22 March	Psychodrama	Dave	Dave/Neighbourhood	
29 March	Psychodrama	Dave	Dave/Neighbourhood	
5 April	Psychodrama	Dave	Dave/Neighbourhood	
12 April	Free Spirit	Khalid	Right Hand Music	
19 April	New Age	KSI and Randolph	KSI and Randolph	
26 April	Not Waving, but Drowning	Loyle Carner	EMI	
3 May	Not Waving, but Drowning	Loyle Carner	EMI	
10 May	Not Waving, but Drowning	Loyle Carner	EMI	
17 May	Confessions of a Dangerous Mind	Logic	Def Jam	
24 May	Nothing Great About Britain	Slowthai	Method	
31 May	Nothing Great About Britain	Slowthai	Method	
7 June	Ignorance Is Bliss	Skepta	Boy Better Know	
14 June	Stacko	MoStack	Virgin	
21 June	The Book of Traps and Lessons	Kae Tempest	Fiction	
28 June	The Book of Traps and Lessons	Kae Tempest	Fiction	
5 July	Indigo	Chris Brown	RCA	
12 July	Gang Signs & Prayer	Stormzy	Merky	
19 July	Back to Black	Amy Winehouse	Island	
26 July	The Lion King: The Gift	Various Artists	RCA	
2 August	The Search	NF	NF Real Music	
9 August	Care Package	Drake	Cash Money/Republic	
16 August	The New Adventures of	P. P. Arnold	earMUSIC	
23 August	Bags and Boxes 4	Blade Brown	Catalyst	
30 August	Back to Black	Amy Winehouse	Island	
6 September	Hoodies All Summer	Kano	Parlophone	
13 September ^{[a]}	Hollywood's Bleeding	Post Malone	Republic	
20 September	Hollywood's Bleeding	Post Malone	Republic	
27 September	Hollywood's Bleeding	Post Malone	Republic	
4 October	Hollywood's Bleeding	Post Malone	Republic	
11 October	Igor	Tyler, the Creator	Columbia	
18 October	Back to Black	Amy Winehouse	Island	
25 October ^{[b]}	Hollywood's Bleeding	Post Malone	Republic	
1 November	Jesus Is King	Kanye West	Def Jam	
8 November	Merry Christmas	Mariah Carey	Sony	
15 November	Hollywood's Bleeding	Post Malone	Republic	
22 November	Our Pathetic Age	DJ Shadow	Mas Appeal	
29 November	Cuz I Love You	Lizzo	Atlantic	
6 December	Grime MC	Jme	Boy Better Know	
13 December	Grime MC	Jme	Boy Better Know	
20 December ^{[b]}	Heavy Is the Head	Stormzy	Atlantic/Merky	
27 December ^{[b]}	Heavy Is the Head	Stormzy	Atlantic/Merky	

== Notes ==
- ^{a} - The album was simultaneously number-one on the UK Albums Chart.
- ^{b} - The artist was simultaneously number-one on the R&B Singles Chart.

== See also ==
- List of UK Albums Chart number ones of the 2010s
- List of UK R&B Singles Chart number ones of 2019
