= God's Problem Child =

Studio album by Willie Nelson
- Released: April 28, 2017
- Genre: Country
- Length: 44:25
- Label: Legacy Recordings
- Producer: Buddy Cannon

Willie Nelson chronology
For the Good Times: A Tribute to Ray Price (2016)	God's Problem Child (2017)	Willie and the Boys: Willie's Stash, Vol. 2 (2017)

Singles from God’s Problem Child
- 1. "A Woman’s Love" Released: February 14, 2017; 2. "It Gets Easier" Released: March 9, 2017; 3. "Old Timer" Released: March 28, 2017; 4. "He Won’t Ever Be Gone" Released: April 6, 2017; 5. "Still Not Dead" Released: April 27, 2017

God's Problem Child is the 66th solo studio album by American singer-songwriter Willie Nelson. It was released on April 28, 2017, by Legacy Recordings. The album features new songs co-written by Nelson and producer Buddy Cannon. Using their frequent method, Cannon and Nelson wrote the songs exchanging the lyrics in text messages, while Nelson later recorded his vocals in the studio.

== Content ==
The title track was written by Jamey Johnson and Tony Joe White, and features vocals by Leon Russell in one of his last recordings. Alison Krauss provides background vocals on the tracks "True Love" and "Little House on the Hill". The original album title, I'm Not Dead, refers to the recurrent hoaxes announcing Nelson's death. "Delete and Fast-Forward" describes Nelson's view on the 2016 United States elections. The release includes a song written by Cannon's mother, Lyndel Rhodes. It also includes "He Won't Ever Be Gone", a tribute to Merle Haggard written by Gary Nicholson. Seven tracks on the album are written by Nelson and Cannon. Alongside traditional music retailers, the release was made available for pre-order on the website PledgeMusic along with promotional merchandise.

== Release and reception ==
The album's lead single, "A Woman's Love", and its respective video premiered on Rolling Stone's website on February 14, 2017. The video for the single "It Gets Easier" was later premiered by the Los Angeles Times on March 9. Later, on March 28, the video for "Old Timer" first appeared on The Daily Beast.

Upon its release, God's Problem Child reached number one on Billboard's Top Country Albums with 36,000 album-equivalent units and 34,000 pure sales. It became Nelson's sixteenth country album chart-topper, while it also entered the Billboard 200 at number ten.

Professional ratings
Aggregate scores
Source	Rating
Metacritic	79/100
Review scores
Source	Rating
AllMusic	4/5 stars
Rolling Stone	4/5 stars
Uncut	8/10
PopMatters	8/10 stars
Record Collector	4/5 stars
Paste	8.5/10
Pitchfork	7.6/10
Austin American-Statesman	Favorable

AllMusic awarded the album four stars out of five. The review noted an improvement in Nelson's voice, compared to his releases of 2016. Critic Stephen Thomas Erlewine concluded, "It's simply an uncommonly strong latter-day record from Willie Nelson: there isn't a hint of fussiness and the songs and the performances are so understated, they only seem richer with repeated spins". Rolling Stone praised the album observing that age is a focus of Nelson's new songwriting giving him "(a) renewed purpose as a lyricist and heightened vulnerability as a vocalist".

Uncut rated the album eight out of ten, and favored Nelson's songwriting, while it called the single "Still Not Dead" one of Nelson's "modern masterpieces". Popmatters delivered a favorable review, calling it an "indisputable high point" of Nelson's latest records. Record Collector rated the album four out of five stars, hailing Nelson as a "bona fide legend who’s never sounded more alive". Paste felt that the release was "as vital" as the rest of Nelson's repertoire.

Pitchfork summed up the album by calling Nelson "(a) cosmic joker contemplating mortality with endearing humor and touching honesty". The Austin American-Statesman opined that it was "Nelson’s best album since the 1990s" and attributed its success to "(a) near-perfect balance between Willie as songwriter and as interpreter". Sounds Like Nashville added that "Nelson isn’t going to go quietly in the night. The 'Red Headed Stranger' has never done anything in that fashion, and at age 84, the singer continues to come out swinging on all cylinders."

== Commercial performance ==
The album debuted at number one on Billboard's Top Country Albums chart, selling 34,000 in copies (36,000 equivalent albums in total) in its first week. This is his record-extending 50th top 10 album on the Top Country Albums chart. It also debuted at number ten on the Billboard 200, becoming Nelson's sixth top 10 album on the chart. It has sold 108,300 copies in the United States as of June 2018.

== Track listing ==
No.	Title	Writer(s)	Length
1.	"Little House on the Hill"	Lyndel Rhodes	3:02
2.	"Old Timer"	Donnie Fritts, Lenny LeBlanc	3:34
3.	"True Love"	Willie Nelson, Buddy Cannon	3:01
4.	"Delete and Fast Forward"	Nelson, Cannon	3:25
5.	"A Woman's Love"	Mike Reid, Sam Hunter	3:23
6.	"Your Memory Has a Mind of Its Own"	Nelson, Cannon	3:29
7.	"Butterfly"	Sonny Throckmorton, Mark Sherrill	3:51
8.	"Still Not Dead"	Nelson, Cannon	2:33
9.	"God's Problem Child"	Jamey Johnson, Tony Joe White	4:57
10.	"It Gets Easier"	Nelson, Cannon	3:07
11.	"Lady Luck"	Nelson, Cannon	3:31
12.	"I Made a Mistake"	Nelson, Cannon	3:17
13.	"He Won't Ever Be Gone"	Gary Nicholson	3:15

== Personnel ==
- Barry Bales – bass
- Jim "Moose" Brown – keyboards
- Buddy Cannon – backing vocals, acoustic guitar
- Melonie Cannon – backing vocals
- Fred Eltringham – drums, percussion, tambourine
- Kevin Grantt – bass
- Ben Haggard – backing vocals, electric guitar
- Jamey Johnson – backing vocals
- Alison Krauss – backing vocals
- Leon Russell – backing vocals
- Rachel Loy – bass
- James Mitchell – electric guitar
- Mickey Raphael – harmonica, Jew's-harp
- Bobby Terry – acoustic guitar, steel guitar
- Tony Joe White – harmonica, acoustic guitar, electric guitar
- Lonnie Wilson – drums

== Charts ==
=== Weekly charts ===
Chart (2017)	Peak position
Australian Albums (ARIA)	38
Austrian Albums (Ö3 Austria)	41
Belgian Albums (Ultratop Flanders)	120
Canadian Albums (Billboard)	30
Dutch Albums (Album Top 100)	67
German Albums (Offizielle Top 100)	76
Irish Albums (IRMA)	43
New Zealand Heatseekers Albums (RMNZ)	5
Norwegian Albums (VG-lista)	39
Scottish Albums (Official Charts)	18
Swiss Albums (Schweizer Hitparade)	42
UK Albums (Official Charts)	64
US Billboard 200	10
US Top Country Albums (Billboard)	1

=== Year-end charts ===
Chart (2017)	Position
US Top Country Albums (Billboard)	56
