= AJ Tracey (album) =

Studio album by AJ Tracey
- Released: 8 February 2019
- Genres: British hip hop; garage; grime
- Length: 48:04
- Label: Self-released
- Producers: 1Mind; ADP; AJ Tracey; AnxqBeats; Cadenza; Charlie Hanson; Conducta; Cubeatz; Kazza; Keith Varon; M1OnTheBeat; Maaly Raw; Malik Ninety Five; Nyge; Rex Kudo; ShooshyBeats; Steel Banglez; Sushi Ceej; Swifta Beater; Take a Daytrip; the Elements; Wallis Lane

AJ Tracey chronology
Secure the Bag! (2017)	AJ Tracey (2019)	Secure the Bag! 2 (2020)

AJ Tracey albums chronology
AJ Tracey (2019)	Flu Game (2021)

Singles from AJ Tracey
- 1. "Butterflies" Released: 30 May 2018; 2. "Doing It" Released: 20 November 2018; 3. "Psych Out!" Released: 17 January 2019; 4. "Necklace" Released: 8 March 2019; 5. "Ladbroke Grove" Released: 4 June 2019

AJ Tracey is the debut studio album by British rapper AJ Tracey, released independently on 8 February 2019. It follows his EP Secure the Bag! (2017). The album features guest appearances from Not3s, Jay Critch and Giggs. Tracey embarked on a world tour from March 2019 in support of the album, with the first dates taking place in the UK and Ireland. The deluxe edition was released on 25 October 2019, with five additional songs.

Five singles were released to promote the album: "Butterflies" featuring Not3s, "Doing It", "Psych Out!", "Necklace" featuring Jay Critch, and "Ladbroke Grove". AJ Tracey received critical acclaim and debuted at number three on the UK Albums Chart. It has been certified Gold by the British Phonographic Industry (BPI). "Ladbroke Grove" peaked at number three on the UK Singles Chart, was nominated for Song of the Year at the 2020 Brit Awards and is now certified Platinum x2 by the British Phonographic Industry (BPI).

== Background ==
Tracey told Julie Adenuga on Beats 1 that the album would feature a variety of genres, including Trinidadian soca, dance and country, explaining that in the way that "Butterflies" is "obviously not a traditional dancehall track [but] my take on dancehall, [...] when I say I'm making country music, it's my take on country music", clarifying that along with guitars and strings, the tracks feature 808s. Tracey also revealed that Smoke Boys and possibly Dave would make appearances on the album.

== Title and cover art ==
He also said that he decided to make his debut album self-titled because he believes it to be "cool" when artists do it: "It's confident it just means like this is me, this is my project, here you go".

Tracey stated that he wanted a baby goat, and contacted the man who supplied the alligator for the video of second single "Doing It". The man told him he needed to buy two as they get lonely if they are alone; he purchased them, naming one AJ and the other Tracey, with Tracey featuring on the cover art. He later donated the goats to a farm.

== Critical reception ==
Professional ratings
Aggregate scores
Source	Rating
AnyDecentMusic?	7.2/10
Metacritic	81/100
Review scores
Source	Rating
Clash	9/10
The Guardian	4/5 stars
The Independent	4/5 stars
The Line of Best Fit	8.5/10
NME	4/5 stars
The Observer	3/5 stars
Pitchfork	6.8/10

At Metacritic, which assigns a weighted mean rating out of 100 to reviews from mainstream publications, the album received a score of 81, based on 9 reviews, indicating "universal acclaim".

AJ Tracey received generally positive reviews from critics. Writing for Clash, Aaron Bishop stated that on Tracey's self-titled LP, he "is at the peak of his powers". He noted that "one artistic weapon from his arsenal that runs through the record is a surprisingly adept singing ability" and that he "either sings or treads the line between rapping and singing in his verses". He noted that Traey's lyricism is "full of self-assured confidence" and states that "with his debut album he firmly establishes himself as one of the leading lights in UK rap". Tom Connick of NME wrote about the album's versatility, stating that the project includes genres such as "hip-hop, pop, bashment, afroswing, blues, [and] R&B". He noted that the album "makes for a vibrant listen", concluding his review by writing that "AJ Tracey’s debut is perhaps the best of the current crop; twisted, vibrant and ever-shifting, but linked with that confident voice". Dean Van Nguyen of Pitchfork wrote that the "self-titled debut album is a veritable smorgasbord of local and international sounds, inviting elements of dancehall, pop, trap, and garage to the same house party" while noting that "Tracey ensures the album links the UK urban music’s past and present. Which of the mixed bag of styles deployed on AJ Tracey will be further investigated in the future remains a mystery. What is clear is that he has talent and star power for days—talents that could have been better showcased here."

The Guardian's Alex Petridis wrote that "there’s self-awareness and occasionally very British wit behind [the lyrics]". Petridis stated that there's a clear influence from Drake throughout the project, stating that "Tracey is smart enough to take on his influence while scrupulously avoiding the rapper’s penchant for solipsism and self-pity". Writing for The Independent, Roisin O'Connor positively wrote that "[Tracey] recognises his roots and includes plenty of nods to grime, his magpie’s eye for a good melody or hook extends far beyond that". O'Connor noted that the project is extremely versatile, writing that "the variety and scale of ambition on this album is breathtaking" and that "fans will be surprised to discover Tracey sings almost as much as he raps, in pleasingly gruff tones".

Sam Higgins of The Line of Best Fit wrote that since Tracey's debut in rap, "AJ’s flow hasn’t slowed, his ability to deliver it across multiple genres has grown impressively" and that "with this record, he’s laid to down a marker, not just for 2019, but for the future of UK rap". Comparing Tracey to the highly acclaimed J Hus, he wrote that "it’s hard to think of a debut so confident in every musical aspect since J Hus' Common Sense". The Observer's Kitty Empire wrote that "the MC born Ché Wolton Grant is on fire, yet in some danger of losing his individuality".

== Commercial performance ==
AJ Tracey debuted at number three on the UK Albums Chart and number one on the UK R&B Album Chart selling 12,894 copies first-week. The album debuted at number fifteen on the Irish Albums Chart, and also entered the Scottish Albums Chart and Dutch Album Top 100. AJ Tracey received 1 million streams on the day of its release.

== Track listing ==
No.	Title	Producer(s)	Length
1.	"Plan B"	Cadenza	3:16
2.	"Jackpot"	Maaly Raw	2:59
3.	"Rina"	Nyge	2:47
4.	"Wifey Riddim 3"	Steel Banglez; Hazard	2:52
5.	"Double C's"	Sushi Ceej	4:08
6.	"Country Star"	Kazza	3:24
7.	"Psych Out!"	Rex Kudo; Charlie Handsome	2:55
8.	"Butterflies" (with Not3s)	Nyge	3:44
9.	"Necklace" (with Jay Critch)	1Mind; Wallis Lane	3:46
10.	"Prada Me"	1Mind; Keith Varon	3:21
11.	"Ladbroke Grove"	Conducta	3:10
12.	"Doing It"	Swifta Beater	3:03
13.	"Nothing But Net" (with Giggs)	ADP; Nyge	3:07
14.	"Horror Flick"	Swifta Beater	2:50
15.	"Triple S"	Malik Ninety Five	2:42
Total length:			48:04

Deluxe edition (bonus tracks)
No.	Title	Producer(s)	Length
16.	"Halloween" (featuring Young Adz)	Nyge	2:25
17.	"Migos"	M1OnTheBeat	3:38
18.	"Cat Pack"	Take a Daytrip	2:45
19.	"Floss" (featuring MoStack and Not3s)	The Elements; AJ Tracey	3:02
20.	"Zelda" (featuring SahBabii and Safe)	Maaly Raw; Cubeatz	4:09
Total length:			64:03

Samples

- "Ladbroke Grove" contains a sample of "Wandering Romance", written by Jorja Smith, Michael Stafford and Felix Joseph, and performed by Jorja Smith.

Notes

- The deluxe edition of the album features a remix of "Butterflies" featuring Popcaan in place of the original.

== Charts ==
=== Weekly charts ===
Chart (2019)	Peak position
Dutch Albums (Album Top 100)	108
Irish Albums (Official Charts)	15
Scottish Albums (Official Charts)	44
UK Albums (Official Charts)	3
UK R&B Albums (Official Charts)	1

=== Year-end charts ===
Chart (2019)	Position
UK Albums (OCC)	42

== Certifications ==
Region	Certification	Certified units/sales
United Kingdom (BPI)	Gold	100,000^{‡}
^{‡} Sales+streaming figures based on certification alone.
