= Last Man Standing (Willie Nelson album) =

Studio album by Willie Nelson
- Released: April 27, 2018
- Recorded: 2017–2018
- Studios: Sound Emporium (Nashville, Tennessee); Pedestal (Spicewood)
- Genre: Country
- Length: 33:34
- Label: Legacy
- Producer: Buddy Cannon

Willie Nelson chronology
Willie and the Boys: Willie's Stash, Vol. 2 (2017)	Last Man Standing (2018)	My Way (2018)

Singles from Last Man Standing
- 1. "Last Man Standing" Released: February 16, 2018; 2. "Me and You" Released: March 14, 2018; 3. "Something You Get Through" Released: April 6, 2018; 4. "Ready to Roar" Released: April 20, 2018; 5. "Bad Breath" Released: April 27, 2018; 6. "Heaven Is Closed" Released: May 15, 2018

Last Man Standing is the 67th solo studio album by Willie Nelson. It was released on April 27, 2018, by Legacy Recordings.

== Critical reception ==
Professional ratings
Aggregate scores
Source	Rating
Metacritic	84/100
Review scores
Source	Rating
AllMusic	4/5 stars
The Austin Chronicle	4/5 stars
Irish Times	4/5 stars
Paste	8.4/10
PopMatters	8/10 stars
Rolling Stone	3.5/5 stars
Vice (Expert Witness)	A

The album was widely praised by music critics, and it received a Metacritic rating of 84 based on 11 critics, indicating "universal acclaim".

== Commercial performance ==
The album debut on No. 3 on Billboard's Top Country Album chart with 26,000 equivalent album units, mostly in traditional album sales. It sold a further 8,700 copies in the second week. It has sold 82,900 copies in the United States as of April 2019.

== Track listing ==
All tracks are written by Willie Nelson and Buddy Cannon, except where noted.

Standard edition
No.	Title	Length
1.	"Last Man Standing"	2:59
2.	"Don't Tell Noah"	2:28
3.	"Bad Breath"	3:03
4.	"Me and You"	2:50
5.	"Something You Get Through"	3:52
6.	"Ready to Roar"	2:35
7.	"Heaven Is Closed"	3:16
8.	"I Ain't Got Nothin’"	3:00
9.	"She Made My Day"	2:43
10.	"I'll Try to Do Better Next Time"	2:59
11.	"Very Far to Crawl"	3:48
Total length:		33:34

Cracker Barrel deluxe edition bonus tracks
No.	Title	Writer(s)	Length
12.	"The Front Row"		2:40
13.	"Who’ll Buy My Memories"	Willie Nelson	3:17
14.	"Summer of Roses" / "December Day"	Nelson	3:49
Total length:			43:21

== Personnel ==
- Buddy Cannon – production
- Alison Krauss – background vocals, fiddle
- Willie Nelson – vocals, guitar
- Mickey Raphael – harmonica
- James Mitchell – guitar
- Bobby Terry – electric guitar, steel guitar, acoustic guitar

== Charts ==
=== Weekly charts ===
Chart (2018)	Peak position
Australian Albums (ARIA)	140
Austrian Albums (Ö3 Austria)	32
Belgian Albums (Ultratop Flanders)	121
Canadian Albums (Billboard)	52
Dutch Albums (Album Top 100)	86
German Albums (Offizielle Top 100)	39
Irish Albums (IRMA)	71
New Zealand Heatseeker Albums (RMNZ)	5
Norwegian Albums (VG-lista)	26
Scottish Albums (Official Charts)	13
Swiss Albums (Schweizer Hitparade)	34
UK Albums (Official Charts)	46
UK Country Albums (Official Charts)	2
US Billboard 200	14
US Top Country Albums (Billboard)	3

=== Year-end charts ===
Chart (2018)	Position
US Top Country Albums (Billboard)	80

== Release history ==
Country	Date	Format	Label	Edition(s)
Worldwide	April 27, 2018	CD, LP, digital download	Legacy Recordings	Standard edition
United States	April 27, 2018	CD	Legacy Recordings	Cracker Barrel deluxe edition
