= From Where We Stand =

2014 studio album by Ward Thomas

Studio album by Ward Thomas
- Released: 20 July 2014
- Recorded: 2013
- Genre: Country
- Label: WTW Music

Ward Thomas chronology
From Where We Stand (2014)	Cartwheels (2016)

Singles from From Where We Stand
- 1. "Push for the Stride" Released: 2014; 2. "The Good & the Right" Released: 2014; 3. "Town Called Ugley" Released: 2014; 4. "Guest List" Released: 2014

From Where We Stand is the debut studio album by British modern country-pop music duo Ward Thomas. It was released in the United Kingdom on 20 July 2014 by WTW Music. The album includes the singles "Push for the Stride", "The Good & the Right", "Town Called Ugley" and "Guest List". The album peaked at number 41 on the UK Albums Chart.

== Track listing ==
Standard version
No.	Title	Writer(s)	Producer(s)	Length
1.	"Push for the Stride"	Catherine Ward Thomas; Elizabeth Ward Thomas; Matthew Greaves; Ann Marie Simmons	Chris Rodriguez; Bobby Blazier	3:52
2.	"Way Back When"	C. Thomas; E. Thomas; Greaves	Chris Rodriguez; Bobby Blazier	3:39
3.	"Footnotes (Happy Ending)"	C. Thomas; E. Thomas; Greaves; Collette Parsons	Rodriguez; Blazier	3:42
4.	"The Good and the Right"	C. Thomas; E. Thomas; Greaves; Simmons	Rodriguez; Blazier	3:31
5.	"From Where I Stand"	C. Thomas; E. Thomas; Greaves; Simmons	Rodriguez; Blazier	5:29
6.	"Take That Train"	C. Thomas; E. Thomas; Greaves; Simmons	Rodriguez; Blazier	5:01
7.	"Guest List"	C. Thomas; E. Thomas; Greaves; Simmons	Rodriguez; Blazier	3:36
8.	"Try"	C. Thomas; E. Thomas; Simmons	Rodriguez; Blazier	4:48
9.	"Wasted Words"	C. Thomas; E. Thomas; Greaves; Simmons	Rodriguez; Blazier	4:30
10.	"Company"	C. Thomas; E. Thomas; Simmons	Rodriguez; Blazier	3:58
11.	"Caledonia"	Dougie MacLean	Greaves	3:56
12.	"Town Called Ugley"	C. Thomas; E. Thomas; Greaves; Simmons	Rodriguez; Blazier	3:33

Deluxe version (bonus tracks)
No.	Title	Writer(s)	Producer(s)	Length
13.	"Man in the Mirror"	Siedah Garrett; Glen Ballard	Hugh Worskett	3:55
14.	"Who We Are"	C. Thomas; E. Thomas; Greaves; Simmons	Worskett	3:52
15.	"Push for the Stride" (Live in Nottingham)	C. Thomas; E. Thomas; Greaves; Simmons		4:47
16.	"Guest List" (Live in Glasgow)	C. Thomas; E. Thomas; Greaves; Simmons		3:33
17.	"Caledonia" (Live in Glasgow)	MacLean		5:13
18.	"Town Called Ugley" (Live in Milton Keynes)	C. Thomas; E. Thomas; Greaves; Simmons		3:51

== Weekly charts ==
Chart (2014)	Peak position
Scottish Albums (OCC)	36
UK Albums (OCC)	41
UK Album Downloads (OCC)	38
UK Country Albums (OCC)	1
UK Independent Albums (OCC)	7

== Release history ==
Region	Release date	Format	Label
United Kingdom	20 July 2014	Digital download; CD	WTW Music
