= Restless Minds =

2018 studio album by Ward Thomas

Studio album by Ward Thomas
- Released: 2019
- Studio: Miloco
- Genre: Country
- Length: 49:10
- Label: Sony/WTW

Ward Thomas chronology
A Shorter Story (2017)	Restless Minds (2019)	The Space Between (2020)

Restless Minds is the third studio album by British modern country-pop music duo Ward Thomas. It was released in 2019 by Sony Music/WTW Music. It reached number eight on the UK Albums Chart and number one on the UK Country Albums Chart.

== Track listing ==
1. "No Filter" – 3:07
2. "Lie Like Me" – 2:55
3. "One More Goodbye" – 3:39
4. "It's Not Just Me" – 3:12
5. "Ain't That Easy" – 3:10
6. "Rather Be Breathing" – 3:21
7. "Hopeless" – 3:13
8. "Never Know" – 2:45
9. "Same Love" – 3:15
10. "Changing" – 4:03
11. "No Fooling Me" – 2:46
12. "I Believe in You" – 3:01
13. "Little Girl Sorrow" – 3:35
14. "Deepest You" – 3:46
15. "This Too Will Pass" – 3:52

== Charts ==
Chart performance for Restless Minds
Chart (2019)	Peak position
Scottish Albums (OCC)	5
UK Albums (OCC)	8
UK Country Albums (OCC)	1
