= Ladbroke Grove (song) =

- Remix single cover

Single by AJ Tracey

from the album AJ Tracey
- Released: 4 June 2019
- Genre: UK garage
- Length: 3:10 (album version); 3:05 (remix)
- Label: Self-released
- Songwriters: Ché Grant; Collins Nemi
- Producer: Conducta

AJ Tracey singles chronology
"Fashion Week" (2019)	"Ladbroke Grove" (2019)	"Choose Sides" (2019)

"Ladbroke Grove" is a song by British rapper AJ Tracey, written by AJ Tracey and Conducta and produced by Conducta. It was released on 4 June 2019 as the fifth single from AJ Tracey's self-titled debut album. The song contains a sample of "Wandering Romance", written by Jorja Smith, Michael Stafford and Felix Joseph, and performed by Jorja Smith. The song is based in the area of the same name in west London.

Initially debuting at number 48 on the UK Singles Chart in February 2019, the song eventually peaked at number three in October 2019 following its release as a single. In November 2025, the British Phonographic Industry certified the song as quadruple platinum for sales of 2,400,000 equivalent units.

In September 2019, NME included the remix of "Ladbroke Grove" in their "25 essential UK garage anthems" list.

== Track listing ==
Digital download
No.	Title	Length
1.	"Ladbroke Grove"	3:10

Remix
No.	Title	Length
1.	"Ladbroke Grove" (featuring General Levy and Novelist)	3:05

== Charts ==
=== Weekly charts ===
Chart (2019)	Peak position
Ireland (IRMA)	6
Scotland Singles (OCC)	23
UK Singles (OCC)	3
UK Indie (OCC)	1
UK Hip Hop/R&B (OCC)	2

=== Year-end charts ===
Chart (2019)	Position
Ireland (IRMA)	43
UK Singles (OCC)	18
Chart (2020)	Position
UK Singles (OCC)	74

== Certifications ==
Region	Certification	Certified units/sales
Denmark (IFPI Danmark)	Gold	45,000^{‡}
New Zealand (RMNZ)	Platinum	30,000^{‡}
United Kingdom (BPI)	4× Platinum	2,400,000^{‡}
^{‡} Sales+streaming figures based on certification alone.
