= Ward Thomas (band) =

English modern country-pop duo

- Origin: Petersfield, Hampshire, England
- Genres: Country pop, Americana
- Years active: 2014–present
- Labels: WTW Music; Sony Music
- Members: Catherine Ward Thomas; Lizzy Ward Thomas

Ward Thomas is an English modern country-pop duo, composed of twin sisters Catherine and Lizzy Ward Thomas from Hampshire. The band has been called "Britain's first country stars". Cartwheels, their second studio album, became the first album by a UK country act to reach number one on the UK Albums Chart, surpassing the previous record by the Shires. It has since gone gold in the UK.

== Early life ==
Catherine and Lizzy are twins, born two minutes apart, who grew up on a farm in rural Hampshire, England, and were educated at Alton School, a Roman Catholic private day school, where they acquired the nicknames "Scruff 1" and "Scruff 2" because they were "so bad at being neat and tidy".

Their father is Anthony Ward-Thomas, who in 1985 founded his own eponymous removals business.

== Career ==
=== 2014–2015: From Where We Stand ===
They co-wrote the songs for their debut album From Where We Stand, which was released on 20 July 2014. It peaked at number 41 on the UK Albums Chart, number 1 on the UK Country Chart, number 7 on the UK Indie Chart and number 36 in Scotland. The album won UK Album of the Year at the British Country Music Awards and sold over 25,000 copies. They have toured the UK multiple times, with shows at venues including Islington Assembly Hall and The New Adelphi Club in Hull, East Yorkshire. In 2014, they performed on the BBC Introducing stage at the BBC Radio 2 Live in Hyde Park festival, returning to the festival in 2015 to perform on the main stage alongside The Shires; a performance which was broadcast live on BBC Radio 2.

=== 2016–2017: Cartwheels and A Shorter Story ===
In June 2016, Ward Thomas announced a joint venture with Sony Music and that their second album, Cartwheels, would be released in September 2016. Lead single "Carry You Home", described by The Times as "chirpy country pop" was released in June, followed by the singles "Guilty Flowers" and "Cartwheels", all of which were added to the Radio 2 playlist. Cartwheels reached number 1 in the UK Albums Chart, making Ward Thomas the first UK country act to top the charts and officially making them the most successful UK country act. It has since gone gold in the UK. In September 2016, Ward Thomas were confirmed to play at the 31st edition of Eurosonic Noorderslag in Groningen and in March 2017, Ward Thomas were announced as the official opening act for the Country to Country 2017 festival.

On 28 October 2016, Ward Thomas released the single version of "Cartwheels", featuring a cover of Lenny Kravitz's song "Fly Away" which was also featured on the TV show "Countrywise". On 31 March 2017, Ward Thomas released their first EP, A Shorter Story, which features the duo covering five of their favourite songs. In 2017, they supported American country superstar Miranda Lambert on the UK leg of her Highway Vagabond Tour.

=== 2017–present: Restless Minds ===
In July 2018, Ward Thomas announced that they will release their third album, Restless Minds. The announcement coincided with the release of lead single "Lie Like Me", a biting indictment of lives faked online. During the 2019 C2C: Country to Country festival, the duo were surprised by Cam at the CMA Songwriter's Event with the Jeff Walker Global Achievement Award from the Country Music Association, making them only the second UK country act to receive the award.

=== 2026 Proms ===
In September 2026, Ward Thomas performed "Jolene" by Dolly Parton at the Last Night of the Proms, as part of a tribute to the recently deceased Parton, titled "To Dolly, With Love".

== Discography ==
=== Albums ===
Title	Details	Peak chart positions			
Title	Details	UK	UK Country	UK Indie	SCO
From Where We Stand	Released: 20 July 2014; Label: WTW Music; Format: CD, Digital download	41	1	7	36
Cartwheels	Released: 2 September 2016; Label: Sony Music/WTW Music; Format: CD, Digital download, vinyl	1	1	—	1
Restless Minds	Released: 1 February 2019; Label: Sony Music/WTW Music; Format: CD, digital download, streaming	8	1	—	5
Invitation	Released: 9 October 2020; Label: Warner Music Group/WTW Music; Format: CD, digital download, streaming	29	2	—	10
Music in the Madness	Released: 10 March 2023; Label: WTW Music; Format: CD, digital download, streaming	31	1	2	6
"—" denotes an album that did not chart or was not released in that territory.

=== Extended plays ===
Title	Details
A Shorter Story	Released: 31 March 2017; Label: Sony Music, WTW Music; Format: Digital download
The Space Between	Released: 12 June 2020; Label: WTW Music; Format: Digital download

=== Singles ===
Year	Title	Peak chart positions			Album
Year	Title	UK Indie	UK Sales	SCO	Album
2014	"Push for the Stride"	20	—	—	From Where We Stand
2014	"The Good & the Right"	—	—	—	From Where We Stand
2014	"Town Called Ugley"	—	—	—	From Where We Stand
2014	"Guest List"	—	—	—	From Where We Stand
2016	"Carry You Home"	—	87	59	Cartwheels
2016	"Guilty Flowers"	—	—	88	Cartwheels
2016	"Cartwheels"	—	—	—	Cartwheels
2017	"Boomerang"	—	—	—	Cartwheels
2017	"Material"	—	—	—	Cartwheels
2018	"Lie Like Me"	—	—	—	Restless Minds
2019	"No Filter"	—	—	—	Restless Minds
2019	"One More Goodbye"	—	—	—	Restless Minds
2020	"Someday"	—	—	—	Invitation
"—" denotes a single that did not chart or was not released in that territory.

=== Music videos ===
Year	Video
2014	"Footnotes (Happy Endings)"
2014	"The Good And The Right"
2014	"Push For The Stride"
2014	"Way Back When"
2016	"Carry You Home"
2016	"Guilty Flowers"
2016	"Cartwheels"
2017	"Boomerang"
2017	"Material"
2018	"Lie Like Me"
2019	"No Filter"
2019	"One More Goodbye"
2020	"Halfway" (with James Blunt)
2020	"Sweet Time"
