= List of UK Rock & Metal Singles Chart number ones of 2019 =

The UK Rock & Metal Singles Chart is a record chart which ranks the best-selling rock and heavy metal songs in the United Kingdom. Compiled and published by the Official Charts Company, the data is based on each track's weekly physical sales and digital downloads . The first number one of the year was "Christmas Time (Don't Let the Bells End)" by The Darkness. All but five weeks of the year were dominated by "Bohemian Rhapsody" by Queen, with "People" by The 1975 being the only new release to top the chart.

== Chart history ==
Issue date	Single	Artist(s)	Record label(s)	Ref.
3 January	"Christmas Time (Don't Let the Bells End)"	The Darkness	Must Destroy	
10 January	"Bohemian Rhapsody"	Queen	Parlophone	
17 January	"Bohemian Rhapsody"	Queen	Parlophone	
24 January	"Bohemian Rhapsody"	Queen	Parlophone	
31 January	"Bohemian Rhapsody"	Queen	Parlophone	
7 February	"Bohemian Rhapsody"	Queen	Parlophone	
14 February	"Bohemian Rhapsody"	Queen	Parlophone	
21 February	"Bohemian Rhapsody"	Queen	Parlophone	
28 February	"Bohemian Rhapsody"	Queen	Parlophone	
7 March	"Bohemian Rhapsody"	Queen	Parlophone	
14 March	"Bohemian Rhapsody"	Queen	Parlophone	
21 March	"Bohemian Rhapsody"	Queen	Parlophone	
28 March	"Bohemian Rhapsody"	Queen	Parlophone	
4 April	"Bohemian Rhapsody"	Queen	Parlophone	
11 April	"Bohemian Rhapsody"	Queen	Parlophone	
18 April	"Bohemian Rhapsody"	Queen	Parlophone	
25 April	"Bohemian Rhapsody"	Queen	Parlophone	
2 May	"Bohemian Rhapsody"	Queen	Parlophone	
9 May	"Bohemian Rhapsody"	Queen	Parlophone	
16 May	"Bohemian Rhapsody"	Queen	Parlophone	
23 May	"Bohemian Rhapsody"	Queen	Parlophone	
30 May	"Bohemian Rhapsody"	Queen	Parlophone	
6 June	"Bohemian Rhapsody"	Queen	Parlophone	
13 June	"Bohemian Rhapsody"	Queen	Parlophone	
20 June	"Bohemian Rhapsody"	Queen	Parlophone	
27 June	"Bohemian Rhapsody"	Queen	Parlophone	
4 July	"Bohemian Rhapsody"	Queen	Parlophone	
11 July	"Bohemian Rhapsody"	Queen	Parlophone	
18 July	"Bohemian Rhapsody"	Queen	Parlophone	
25 July	"Bohemian Rhapsody"	Queen	Parlophone	
1 August	"Bohemian Rhapsody"	Queen	Parlophone	
8 August	"Bohemian Rhapsody"	Queen	Parlophone	
15 August	"Bohemian Rhapsody"	Queen	Parlophone	
22 August	"Bohemian Rhapsody"	Queen	Parlophone	
29 August	"Bohemian Rhapsody"	Queen	Parlophone	
5 September	"People"	The 1975	Polydor/Dirty Hit	
12 September	"Bohemian Rhapsody"	Queen	Parlophone	
19 September	"Bohemian Rhapsody"	Queen	Parlophone	
26 September	"Bohemian Rhapsody"	Queen	Parlophone	
3 October	"Bohemian Rhapsody"	Queen	Parlophone	
10 October	"Bohemian Rhapsody"	Queen	Parlophone	
17 October	"Bohemian Rhapsody"	Queen	Parlophone	
24 October	"Bohemian Rhapsody"	Queen	Parlophone	
31 October	"Bohemian Rhapsody"	Queen	Parlophone	
7 November	"Bohemian Rhapsody"	Queen	Parlophone	
14 November	"Bohemian Rhapsody"	Queen	Parlophone	
21 November	"Bohemian Rhapsody"	Queen	Parlophone	
28 November	"Bohemian Rhapsody"	Queen	Parlophone	
5 December	"Bohemian Rhapsody"	Queen	Parlophone	
12 December	"Christmas Time (Don't Let the Bells End)"	The Darkness	Must Destroy	
19 December	"Christmas Time (Don't Let the Bells End)"	The Darkness	Must Destroy	
26 December	"Christmas Time (Don't Let the Bells End)"	The Darkness	Must Destroy	

== See also ==
- List of UK Rock & Metal Albums Chart number ones of 2019
