= List of UK Rock & Metal Albums Chart number ones of 2019 =

The UK Rock & Metal Albums Chart is a record chart which ranks the best-selling rock and heavy metal albums in the United Kingdom. Compiled and published by the Official Charts Company, the data is based on each album's weekly physical sales and digital downloads.

== Chart history ==
Issue date	Album	Artist(s)	Record label(s)	Ref.
3 January	Nevermind	Nirvana	Geffen	
10 January	Nevermind	Nirvana	Geffen	
17 January	The Dark Side of the Moon	Pink Floyd	Rhino	
24 January	The Dark Side of the Moon	Pink Floyd	Rhino	
31 January	Who Do You Trust?	Papa Roach	Eleven Seven	
7 February	Amo	Bring Me the Horizon	RCA	
14 February	Resist	Within Temptation	Spinefarm	
21 February	Amo	Bring Me the Horizon	RCA	
28 February	Moonglow	Avantasia	Nuclear Blast	
7 March	Distance Over Time	Dream Theater	Century Media	
14 March	So What?	While She Sleeps	Spinefarm	
21 March	Slide It In	Whitesnake	Rhino	
28 March	The Dark Side of the Moon	Pink Floyd	Rhino	
4 April	The Dirt Soundtrack	Mötley Crüe	Masters 2000	
11 April	Empath	Devin Townsend	Inside Out	
18 April	Morbid Stuff	PUP	Rise	
25 April	Love Is All You Love	Band of Skulls	SO	
2 May	Wolf God	Grand Magus	Nuclear Blast	
9 May	Life Metal	Sunn O)))	Southern Lord	
16 May	End of Suffering	Frank Carter & the Rattlesnakes	International Death Cult	
23 May	Flesh & Blood	Whitesnake	Frontiers	
30 May	Rammstein	Rammstein	Spinefarm	
6 June	Rammstein	Rammstein	Spinefarm	
13 June	Rammstein	Rammstein	Spinefarm	
20 June	The Division Bell	Pink Floyd	Rhino	
27 June	Gold & Grey	Baroness	Abraxan Hymns	
4 July	Rise	Hollywood Vampires	EarMUSIC	
11 July	Sigma	The Alarm	21st Century	
18 July	Rammstein	Rammstein	Spinefarm	
25 July	Rammstein	Rammstein	Spinefarm	
1 August	The Great War	Sabaton	Nuclear Blast	
8 August	Balance, Not Symmetry	Biffy Clyro	Warner	
15 August	Rewind, Replay, Rebound	Volbeat	Virgin	
22 August	We Are Not Your Kind	Slipknot	Roadrunner	
29 August	We Are Not Your Kind	Slipknot	Roadrunner	
5 September	We Are Not Your Kind	Slipknot	Roadrunner	
12 September	Fear Inoculum	Tool	Music for Nations	
19 September	Another State of Grace	Black Star Riders	Nuclear Blast	
26 September	The Nothing	Korn	Roadrunner	
3 October	Nine	Blink-182	Columbia	
10 October	In Cauda Venenum	Opeth	Nuclear Blast	
17 October	Easter Is Cancelled	The Darkness	Cooking Vinyl	
24 October	Metal Galaxy	Babymetal	EarMUSIC	
31 October	Walk the Sky	Alter Bridge	Napalm	
7 November	All Aboard the Skylark	Hawkwind	Cherry Red	
14 November	Black to Blues Vol.2	Black Stone Cherry	Mascot	
21 November	The Repentless Killogy - Live at the Forum	Slayer	Nuclear Blast	
28 November	The Dark Side of the Moon	Pink Floyd	Rhino	
5 December	F & M	Lindemann	Spinefarm	
12 December	The Dark Side of the Moon	Pink Floyd	Rhino	
19 December	Decades - Live In Buenos Aires	Nightwish	Nuclear Blast	
26 December	The Dark Side of the Moon	Pink Floyd	Rhino	

== See also ==
- List of UK Rock & Metal Singles Chart number ones of 2019
