= AJ Tracey =

British rapper and record producer (born 1994)

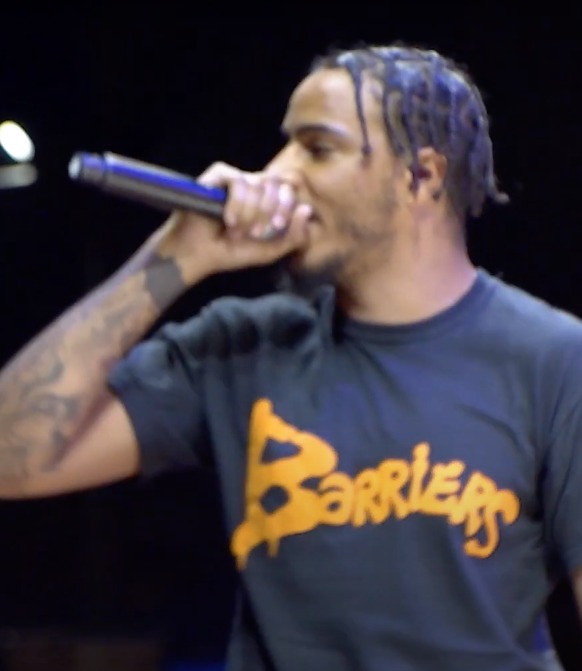
- AJ Tracey performing in 2019

Background information
- Also known as: AJT; GTraceO; Looney; Loonz; AJ; Fulcher
- Born: Ché Wolton Grant; 4 March 1994 (age 32); Brixton, London, England
- Origin: Ladbroke Grove, London, England
- Genres: British hip hop; grime; UK garage; UK drill; trap; dancehall; pop; cloud rap
- Occupations: Rapper; singer; songwriter; dancer; record producer
- Years active: 2009–present
- Label: Revenge
- Website: ajtracey.co.uk

Ché Wolton Grant (born 4 March 1994), known professionally as AJ Tracey, is a British rapper and record producer from Ladbroke Grove, London. Tracey rose to popularity in 2016 and was listed by The Guardian in a list of "best new acts to catch at festivals in 2016".

Tracey's fifth extended play, Secure the Bag! (2017), became his first entry on the UK Albums Chart, at number 13. His 2018 single, "Butterflies" (featuring Not3s), became his commercial breakthrough, peaking within the top 20 of the UK Singles Chart. His self-titled debut album (2019) was met with critical acclaim and peaked at number three on the UK Albums Chart. Its lead single, "Ladbroke Grove", peaked at number three on the UK Singles Chart and was certified platinum by the BPI.

AJ Tracey has released songs with recording artists such as Aitch, Dave, D-Block Europe, Digga D, Giggs, Mabel, Mahalia, MoStack, Skepta, Nelly Furtado, and his cousin Big Zuu.

== Early life ==
AJ Tracey was born in Brixton and raised in Ladbroke Grove. Grant's father, of Afro-Trinidadian origin, is a former rapper, and his Welsh mother is a former jungle DJ. He was named by his mother after the revolutionary Che Guevara.

He has been rapping since the age of four. He was educated locally at Middle Row Primary school and went on to attend Holland Park School. He dropped out of a criminology course at London Metropolitan University to pursue his music career. He is a lifelong supporter of Tottenham Hotspur.

In 2018, AJ Tracey was included on the European edition of Forbes 30 Under 30.

== Career ==
=== 2011–16: Emergence and EPs ===
Under the stage names Looney and Loonz, Tracey's music can be found online dating back to June 2011. An early SoundCloud account, Looney Tell 'Em, contains eleven tracks, each with free downloads enabled. These include four songs from the scrapped grime EP The Dungeon (featuring non-exclusive beats from Spooky and Rude Kid) and two songs from Didn't Make the Cut, originally slated for release on the scrapped hip hop mixtape Fuck a Fairytale. His debut mixtape, Didn't Make the Cut, was released 13 September 2012, and comprises 21 UK rap and grime songs and freestyles which, in his own words, are "the tracks that didn't make it onto my actual mixtape". The project was initially to be titled Scirocco Musik and its artwork still reflects this title. In August 2013, his collective, My Team Paid, announced that they were to release a joint mixtape entitled My Team Paid. One single, "Clouded Skies", emerged, but the project was ultimately scrapped. Tracey's second mixtape, No More Looney, was released through DatPiff on 30 August 2014. The project includes thirty-three tracks, many of which feature fellow My Team Paid members Big Zuu, Jay Amo, Wax and Sketch.

Tracey first gained attention through appearances on pirate radio stations and the release of his debut EP The Front in mid-2015. In December 2015, Tracey released his second EP Alex Moran, which featured acclaimed tracks including "Spirit Bomb" and "Naila". BBC Radio 1Xtra DJ Sian Anderson also played "Swerve and Skid" heavily on her show during 2015, which was the first song of his that was on commercial radio. During this period, Tracey also recorded (but did not release) a trap EP entitled Rain. In 2016, Tracey – a Tottenham Hotspur fan – appeared in promotional material for Sky Sports coverage of the Premier League. He also collaborated with Dave over a remix of Ruff Sqwad's Pied Piper to create a well received track entitled "Thiago Silva".

=== 2017–2020: Secure the Bag! and self-titled album ===
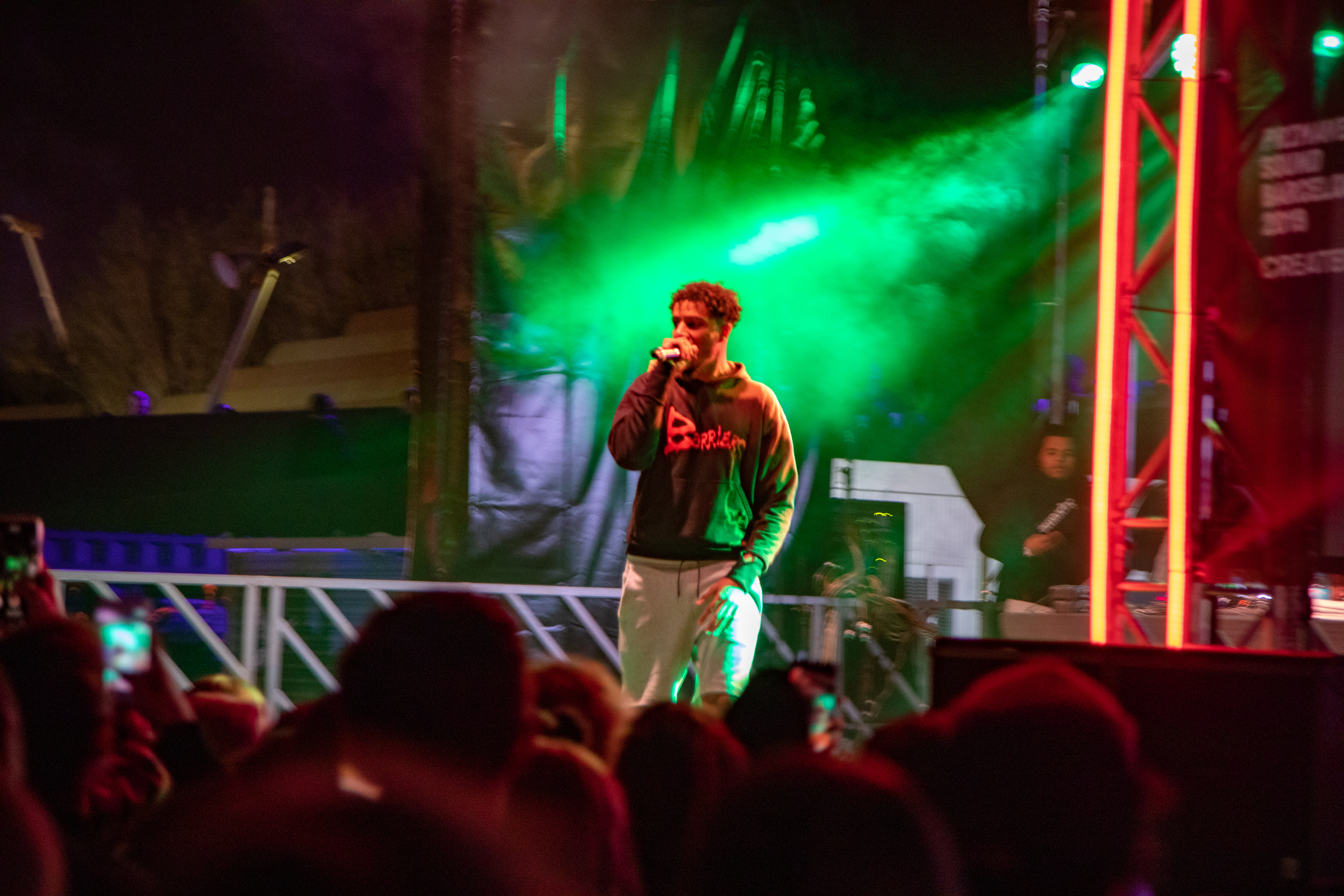
Tracey performing in 2019

In October 2017, Tracey released his fifth EP, Secure the Bag!. He also began producing records that year. He made his production debut on "LA4AWEEK", co-produced by Nyge and released in April 2017, and later produced label-mate Big Zuu's "Tell Man Twice", released in August 2017.

In early 2018, AJ Tracey modelled for the OVO clothing line in 2018. In May 2018, Tracey released the single "Butterflies" featuring Not3s. The song served as AJ Tracey's commercial breakthrough, peaking at number 19 on the UK Singles Chart. The single was followed up with "Lo(v/s)er", which peaked at number 38. Tracey also featured on Craig David's album "The Time is now" collaborating on the track "Somebody like me". In early July 2019 the Swedish rapper Z.E released his platinum selling second album, Mer än rap ("more than rap"). Tracey was featured on the title track "More Than Rap".

On 21 November 2018, Tracey announced the pre-order of his self-titled debut album, released on 8 February 2019. The lead single, "Doing It", was released for streaming and digital on the same day. Four more singles were released to promote AJ Tracey: "Butterflies" featuring Not3s, "Psych Out!", "Necklace" featuring Jay Critch and "Ladbroke Grove". AJ Tracey debuted at number three on the UK Albums Chart and is certified Silver by the British Phonographic Industry (BPI). "Ladbroke Grove" became Tracey's highest-charting single peaking at number three on the UK Singles Chart. On 10 October 2019, Tracey announced the upcoming release of a deluxe edition of AJ Tracey, to feature five new songs and a couple of surprises. The album was released on 25 October. On 14 February 2020, AJ Tracey announced his Australian tour starting in Adelaide on 24 April, but was later postponed due to the COVID-19 pandemic.

=== 2020–present: Secure the Bag! 2 and Flu Game ===
On 6 October 2020, Tracey released the tracklist for his sixth EP, Secure the Bag! 2 on Twitter and was later released on 27 November 2020. The EP debuted at number 75 on the UK Albums Charts.

On 4 February 2021, Tracey featured on the track "Bringing It Back" by Digga D. The song topped the UK Chart's Official Trending Chart and debuted at number 5 on the UK Singles Chart. On 16 April 2021, Tracey released his second studio album titled Flu Game, which includes singles such as "Dinner Guest", "West Ten", "Anxious" and "Bringing It Back". Five hours prior to the release of the album, AJ released the single "Little More Love" as well as releasing a music video on YouTube. On 26 August 2021, Tracey was featured on the Gorillaz track "Jimmy Jimmy" from their Meanwhile EP.

In 2023, he received the Brits Billion Award by the British Phonographic Industry for achieving over 1 billion career streams in the UK, and released the fourth instalment in the Wifey Riddim series, his first track as lead artist since 2022.

On 25 December 2024, Canadian singer Nelly Furtado released "Showstopper" as fourth single from her album 7, remixed and featuring Tracey.

On February 12, 2025, Tracey and singer Jorja Smith released the single "Crush", which heavily samples American singer Brandy's 2002 Full Moon album track "Love Wouldn't Count Me Out". The single peaked at number 23 on the UK Singles Chart, becoming Tracey's highest peaking single since "Little More Love" peaked at number 21 in 2021. The single was nominated for Song of the Year at the 2026 MOBO Awards.

On May 20, 2025, a new series starring Tracey and his cousin Big Zuu called "Big Zuu and AJ Tracey's Rich Flavours" was released on Sky Max. The 3-part show consisted of the pair travelling to Seoul, various parts of Scotland, and New York City.

== Political views ==
In June 2017, Tracey endorsed Labour Party leader Jeremy Corbyn in the 2017 UK general election. In a Labour Party campaign video he said: "The Labour Party strongly support the youth in following their dreams and giving people a chance." He added: "In my opinion we need a Labour government to give young people a hope, a chance for their future and I genuinely believe that Corbyn is the man to do it." In a 2024 interview for What Do You Call It? From Grassroots to the Golden Era of UK Rap, Tracey reflected more critically on the Grime4Corbyn movement, describing it as "pointless" and suggesting that "it was good marketing for them... so good for them."

In an October 2019 interview with The Observer, Tracey voiced concerns about climate change and said: "If I'm voting for anyone now it's the Green Party."

== Discography ==
- AJ Tracey (2019)
- Flu Game (2021)
- Don't Die Before You're Dead (2025)

== Awards and nominations ==
=== Berlin Music Video Awards ===
The Berlin Music Video Awards is an international festival that promotes the art of music videos.

Year	Nominated work	Award	Result	Ref.
2026	"3rd Time Lucky"	Best Animation	Nominated	
