= Scholz Garten =

Beer garden and restaurant in Austin, Texas, U.S.

- U.S. National Register of Historic Places
- Recorded Texas Historic Landmark
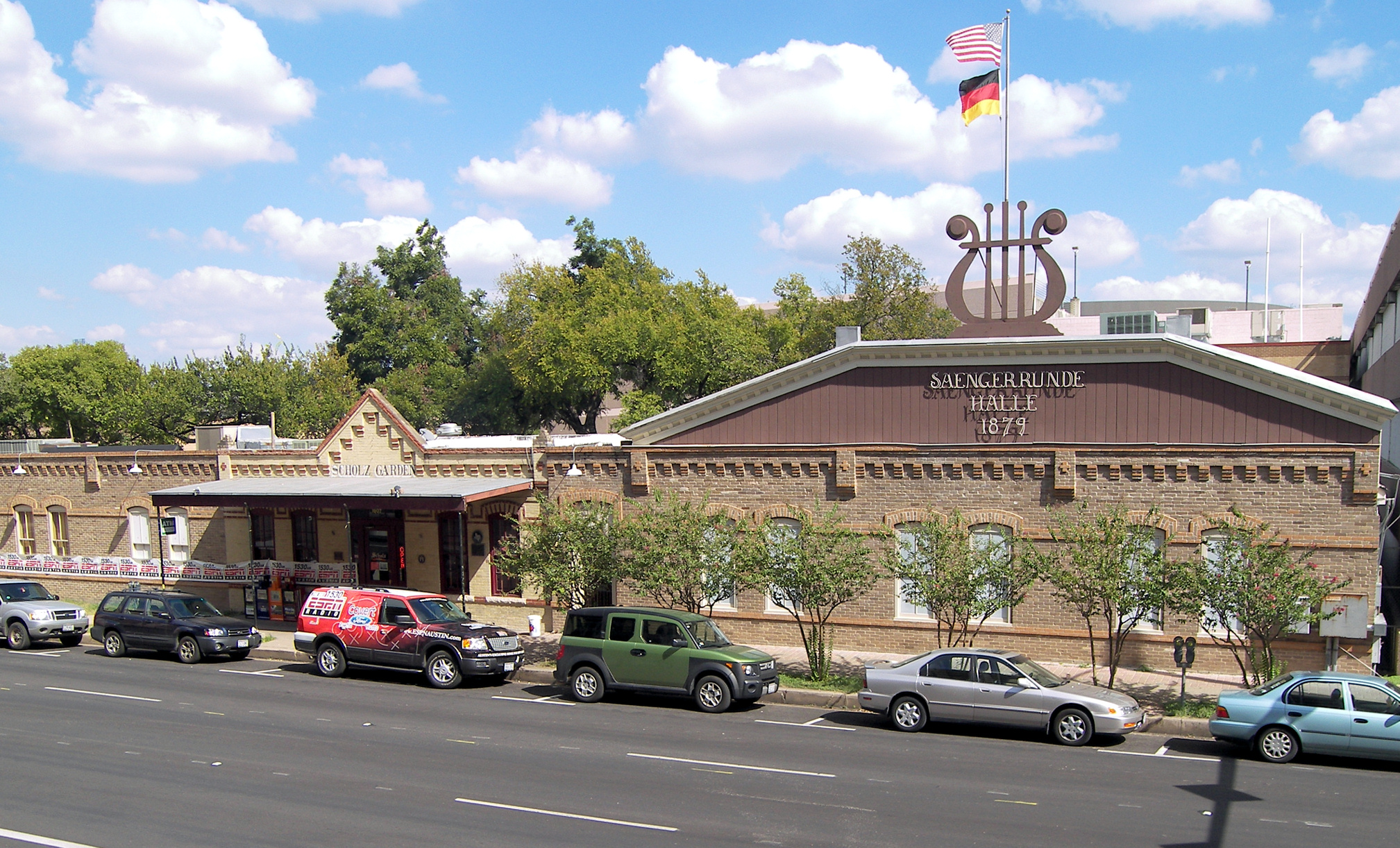
- Scholz Beer Garden in 2007
- Location: 1607 San Jacinto; Austin, Texas, USA
- Coordinates: 30°16′40″N 97°44′11″W
- NRHP reference No.: 79003015
- RTHL No.: 12245

Significant dates
- Added to NRHP: July 27, 1979
- Designated RTHL: 1967

Scholz Garten (also known as Scholz Beer Garden) is a beer garden and restaurant in downtown Austin, Texas and one of the oldest operating businesses in Texas. Among the Texas businesses that predate Scholz Garten are the Daily News in Galveston (1842), the Excelsior Hotel in Jefferson (1858), the Menger Hotel in San Antonio (1859), and Imperial Sugar in Sugar Land (1842).

Established by German immigrant August Scholz in 1866 after the American Civil War, Scholz Garten became a hub for German immigrants and their culture in the capital city. It was purchased by The Austin Saengerrunde in 1914, who still owns it today. It remains a popular gathering spot for both political discussion and University of Texas sports events.

Scholz purchased the lot at 1607 San Jacinto Boulevard in 1862 for about $2,400. In 1908, Austin Saengerrunde added a new hall with a six-lane bowling alley located behind Scholz Garten. The venue closed during Prohibition and reopened afterward; the vintage bowling alley remains in use today as one of the oldest continuously operating centers in the United States.

Scholz Garten was recorded as a Texas Historic Landmark in 1967, and added to the National Register of Historic Places in 1979. The business lease was purchased in 1986 by Eddie Wilson (founder of the Armadillo World Headquarters and Threadgill's), Phil Vitek, and Michael Osborne who restored it in 1987.
