= On the Road Again (Willie Nelson song) =

- UK release picture sleeve

Single by Willie Nelson

from the album Honeysuckle Rose
- B-side: "Jumpin' Cotton Eyed Joe" (Johnny Gimble)
- Released: August 1980
- Recorded: Fall 1979
- Studio: Enactron Truck, Hollywood, California
- Genre: Country
- Length: 2:38
- Label: Columbia
- Songwriter: Willie Nelson
- Producer: Willie Nelson

Willie Nelson singles chronology
"Midnight Rider" (1980)	"On the Road Again" (1980)	"Family Bible" (1980)

Audio video
- "Willie Nelson - On The Road Again (Official Audio)" on YouTube

"On the Road Again" (also labelled as "On the Road Again (Live)" in various album track listings) is a song written and recorded by American country music singer Willie Nelson.

The song, about life on tour, came about when Jerry Schatzberg and Sydney Pollack—the director and executive producer, respectively, of the 1980 film Honeysuckle Rose, in which Nelson starred—approached Nelson about writing the song for the film's soundtrack. "On the Road Again" became Nelson's 9th Country & Western No. 1 hit overall (6th as a solo recording act) in November 1980, and became one of Nelson's most recognizable tunes. In addition, the song reached No. 20 on the Billboard Hot 100, and No. 7 on the Adult Contemporary chart. It was his biggest pop hit to that time and won him a Grammy Award for Best Country Song a year later.

== Background and writing ==
In 1980, Nelson starred in his first leading role in the Jerry Schatzberg film Honeysuckle Rose, about an aging musician and his relationship with his family, who also are part of his band that travels throughout the United States while playing in different venues. Shortly after signing the contract, Nelson was approached during a flight by Schatzberg and the executive producer of the movie, who requested him to write a song about life on the road to use as the theme song. Nelson quickly wrote the song on a barf bag. The tune featured a "train beat".

== Recording ==
The track was recorded during production of the film, in what was essentially a series of live-show performances across multiple venues in Texas.

The recording was engineered by Bradley Hartman, who had previously recorded and mixed Stardust as well as several of Nelson's projects in the mid-1970s. Hartman utilised Brian Ahern's Enactron Truck which provided a Stephens 24-track tape machine and a Neve split console, syncing the audio to the Honeysuckle Rose film. Nelson sang into a Shure SM58 mic; to capture the live band and ambience, additional mics were used (including 451s as overheads).

“On the Road Again” was recorded multiple times, with roughly a dozen takes in different venues and varying audiences, before the final take was selected. The version used for the single and soundtrack was recorded at a club in Austin, Texas, known as the Soap Creek Saloon, over a two-day engagement.

For post-production, the multitrack tapes were later taken to studios in New York City and Los Angeles. Hartman completed the mixing of the album and single at Wally Heider Studios (Studio 4), using their then-new Neve 8108 console and Ampex tape machine. Hartman's final mix preserved the live nature of the take, with audience mics blended in to retain crowd response and ambience, keeping the recording's “live performance” vibe rather than creating a wholly studio-polished sound.

== Release and reception ==
The song was released with Nelson's 1980 album Honeysuckle Rose, reaching the first position on Billboard's top country albums, while it ranked twenty on the Billboard Hot 100. Nelson received a Grammy Award for Best Country Song, while he was nominated for Best Original Song during the 53rd Academy Awards. In 2004, Rolling Stone ranked it No. 471 on its list of the 500 Greatest Songs of All Time. In 2011, "On the Road Again" was inducted to the Grammy Hall of Fame.

== Legacy ==
The song has also featured in several other films and TV series including King of the Hill, South Park, Shrek, Shameless, Family Guy, Forrest Gump, The Big Green, The Littlest Hobo, Monk, Open Season 3, The SpongeBob Movie: Sponge on the Run, Dumb and Dumber To, Nomadland, and Ghostbusters: Afterlife.

A live version of the song is featured in the 2008 video game Guitar Hero World Tour, while the studio version was released for Rock Band via the Rock Band Country Track Pack.

Conan O'Brien performed the song as "My Own Show Again" during his 2010 Legally Prohibited from Being Funny on Television Tour, changing the lyrics to reflect how he could not wait to return to hosting a television series after leaving The Tonight Show earlier in the year.

"Forever Country", a promotional single released in 2016, features the song as a medley with "I Will Always Love You" and "Take Me Home, Country Roads".

First Aid Kit released a cover of "On the Road Again" as a single in 2020. Proceeds from the song sales were donated to Crew Nation in order to support the members of the crew who were forced off the road and out of work due to the COVID-19 pandemic.

== Charts ==
Chart (1980)	Peak position
Australian Kent Music Report	64
Canadian RPM Country Tracks	2
Canadian RPM Adult Contemporary Tracks	3
US Billboard Hot 100	20
US Hot Country Songs (Billboard)	1
US Adult Contemporary (Billboard)	7
US Cashbox Top 100	22

== Certifications ==
Certifications for "On the Road Again"
Region	Certification	Certified units/sales
New Zealand (RMNZ)	Gold	15,000^{‡}
United Kingdom (BPI)	Silver	250,000^{‡}
^{‡} Sales+streaming figures based on certification alone.
