= Michael Osborne =

Michael Osborne or Osborn may refer to:

- Michael Osborne (cricketer) (1932–2016), English cricketer
- Mike Osborne (1941–2007), English jazz musician
- Michael Osborne (actor) (born 1947), British television actor
- Michael J. Osborne (born 1949), American author, entrepreneur and energy policymaker
- Michael Osborne (footballer) (born 1982), Australian rules footballer
- Michael Osborne (academic) (born 1982), Australian professor of machine learning
- Michael Osborn (pathologist), president of the Royal College of Pathologists
- Mike Osborn (1917–2010), officer in the British Army

== See also ==
- Mike Osburn (born 1968), member of the Oklahoma House of Representatives
