= Family Bible (Willie Nelson album) =

Studio album by Willie Nelson
- Released: September 1, 1980
- Recorded: Autumn Sound, Garland, Texas
- Genre: Country gospel
- Length: 33:51
- Label: Songbird
- Producer: Willie Nelson

Willie Nelson chronology
Honeysuckle Rose (1980)	Family Bible (1980)	Somewhere Over the Rainbow (1981)

Singles from Family Bible
- 1. "Family Bible" Released: December 1, 1980

Professional ratings
Review scores
Source	Rating
AllMusic	2/5 stars

Family Bible is a studio album by country singer Willie Nelson. He plays guitar and is accompanied by his sister Bobbie Nelson on piano. The album was dedicated to Mama Nelson.

It contains three original songs, including the title track, and eight other hymns or gospel songs, some dating from the 19th century.

== Track listing ==
1. "By the Rivers of Babylon" (0:50)
2. "Stand by Me" (Charles Albert Tindley) (3:03)
3. "It Is No Secret (What God Can Do)" (Stuart Hamblen) (5:00)
4. "There Shall Be Showers of Blessings" (Daniel Webster, James McGranahan) (3:40)
5. "Softly and Tenderly" (Will Lamartine Thompson) (4:34)
6. "Tell It to Jesus" (Edmund S. Lorenz, Jeremiah Rankin) (3:22)
7. "Family Bible" (Claude Gray, Paul Buskirk, Walter Breeland) (2:52)
8. "In God's Eyes" (Willie Nelson) (3:27)
9. "Revive Us Again" (William Paton Mackay) (2:23)
10. "An Evening Prayer" (C. Maude Battersby, Charles H. Gabriel) (1:40)
11. "Kneel at the Feet of Jesus" (Willie Nelson) (3:00)

== Personnel ==
- Willie Nelson - guitar, vocals
- Bobbie Nelson - Bösendorfer piano

Technical

- Phil York - engineer, photography

== Chart performance ==
Chart (1980)	Peak position
U.S. Billboard Top Country Albums	26
