= Somewhere Over the Rainbow (Willie Nelson album) =

Studio album by Willie Nelson
- Released: February 1981
- Studio: Gilley's Recording Studio (Pasadena, Texas)
- Genre: Country; pop; jazz
- Length: 28:27
- Label: Columbia
- Producer: Willie Nelson, Freddy Powers, Paul Buskirk

Willie Nelson chronology
Family Bible (1980)	Somewhere Over the Rainbow (1981)	Always on My Mind (1982)

Professional ratings
Review scores
Source	Rating
AllMusic	3/5 stars
The Rolling Stone Album Guide	3/5 stars

Somewhere Over the Rainbow is the twenty-sixth studio album by country music singer Willie Nelson, released in 1981. It features 1940s pop standards arranged by Nelson. The album's acoustic jazz instrumentation was also meant to play tribute to one of his heroes, gypsy jazz guitar virtuoso Django Reinhardt, who influenced Nelson's playing.

== Track listing ==
=== Side one ===
1. "Mona Lisa" (Jay Livingston, Ray Evans) (2:28)
2. "Exactly Like You" (Dorothy Fields, Jimmy McHugh) (2:22)
3. "Who's Sorry Now?" (Bert Kalmar, Harry Ruby, Ted Snyder) (2:58)
4. "I'm Confessin' (That I Love You)" (Al Neiburg, Doc Daugherty, Ellis Reynolds) (3:30)
5. "Won't You Ride in My Little Red Wagon" (Rex Griffin) (2:28)

=== Side two ===
1. "Over the Rainbow" (E. Y. Harburg, Harold Arlen) (3:33)
2. "In My Mother's Eyes" (Willie Nelson) (3:06)
3. "I'm Gonna Sit Right Down and Write Myself a Letter" (Fred E. Ahlert, Joe Young) (2:58)
4. "It Wouldn't Be the Same (Without You)" (Fred Rose, Jimmy Wakely) (2:54)
5. "Twinkle, Twinkle Little Star" (Traditional; arranged by Willie Nelson) (2:10)

== Personnel ==
- Willie Nelson – guitar, vocals
- Freddy Powers – guitar, vocals
- Paul Buskirk – tenor guitar, mandolin
- Johnny Gimble – fiddle
- Bob Moore – bass guitar
- Dean Reynolds – upright bass

Technical

- Bert Frilot – engineer
- Norman Seeff – photography

== Charts ==
=== Weekly charts ===
Chart (1981)	Peak position
Canadian Albums (RPM)	23
US Billboard 200	31
US Top Country Albums (Billboard)	1

=== Year-end charts ===
Chart (1981)	Position
US Top Country Albums (Billboard)	20
