= Honeysuckle Rose (film) =

1980 film by Jerry Schatzberg

- Theatrical release poster
- Directed by: Jerry Schatzberg
- Screenplay by: John Binder; Carol Sobieski; William D. Wittliff
- Based on: Intermezzo by Gösta Stevens; Gustaf Molander
- Produced by: Sydney Pollack; Gene Taft
- Starring: Willie Nelson; Dyan Cannon; Amy Irving; Slim Pickens
- Cinematography: Robby Müller
- Edited by: Aram Avakian; Norman Gay; Marc Laub; Evan A. Lottman
- Music by: Richard Baskin
- Production company: Major Studio Partners
- Distributed by: Warner Bros. Pictures
- Release date: July 18, 1980
- Running time: 119 minutes
- Country: United States
- Language: English
- Budget: $11 million
- Box office: $17.8 million

Honeysuckle Rose (also known as On the Road Again) is a 1980 American romantic drama Western film directed by Jerry Schatzberg, written by John Binder, Gustaf Molander, Carol Sobieski, Gösta Stevens, and William D. Wittliff, and starring Willie Nelson, Dyan Cannon and Amy Irving. It is a loose remake of the 1936 Swedish film Intermezzo.

== Plot ==
Country singer Buck Bonham returns to his Honeysuckle Ranch after a concert tour. He reunites with his wife Viv and his son Jamie. At the Bonham family reunion, Buck meets Lily, the daughter of his former guitarist Garland Ramsey. Inside the barn, Buck invites Jamie to play guitar, but he runs off the stage leaving Lily to finish the song. Jamie explains he feels he has no musical talent, but Buck encourages him to wait for his talent to blossom. Later that night, Buck and Viv sing a duet.

The next morning, Buck unsuccessfully persuades Viv to join his next tour, but she refuses. For his upcoming three-week tour, Buck's band mates are unavailable due to precommitments. Viv suggests Lily to join the tour since another guitarist, Cotton Roberts, won't be immediately available. Garland is unsure about his daughter leaving for the tour, but Lily believes it will be a great opportunity.

During the tour, Buck performs at several venues, including one where he invites Emmylou Harris on stage. After a show, Buck shows up at Lily's hotel room and invites her to breakfast. At the diner, Lily tells Buck she has idolized him since she was young. They return to the hotel and embrace each other. Meanwhile, Buck calls Viv at their ranch to add more dates to the tour. As the tour continues, Buck and Lily's relationship deepens until Cotton Roberts joins the band.

During one show, Buck's band upstages Cotton Roberts. Backstage, Cotton confronts Buck, which escalates to a fight, and he leaves the tour. Buck openly kisses Lily shortly thereafter in front of the band. At the ranch, Cotton's manager Brag phones Viv to report that Buck will be sued for breach of contract. Viv leaves the ranch to find Buck onstage, having a duet with Lily. Convinced they are having an affair, Viv rushes on stage after the song to tell the audience she will divorce Buck. On the tour bus, Buck tells Lily he is ending their affair.

The next morning, Buck learns his band mates have decided to play at Garland's concert. While Buck leaves for Mexico, Lily returns to her father's ranch and apologizes. Garland forgives her daughter and travels to Mexico, where he confronts Buck. Drunk on tequila, Garland shoots at Buck with a pistol, but they reconcile and drive the tour bus to Texas. Back at the ranch, Lily apologizes to Viv for her affair.

At Garland's concert, Viv explains her husband and Garland's absence. While she performs, Buck surprises Viv, in which he appears on stage and accompanies her on guitar. Buck performs the next song as an apology to Viv. They rekindle their marriage with an upbeat song.

== Cast ==
- Willie Nelson as Buck Bonham
- Dyan Cannon as Viv Bonham
- Amy Irving as Lily Ramsey
- Slim Pickens as Garland Ramsey
- Joey Floyd as Jamie Bonham
- Charles Levin as Sid
- Mickey Rooney Jr. as Cotton Roberts
- Pepe Serna as Rooster
- Lane Smith as Brag
- Priscilla Pointer as Rosella Ramsey
- Diana Scarwid as Jeanne
- Emmylou Harris as Herself
- Rex Ludwick as Tex
- Mickey Raphael as Kelly
- Bee Spears as Bo
- Chris Ethridge as Easter
- Paul English as Paul
- Bobbie Nelson as Bonnie
- Jody Payne as Jonas
- Johnny Gimble as Fiddler
- Kenneth Threadgill as Yodler
- Grady Martin as Grady
- Hank Cochran as Hank
- Jeannie Seely as Jeannie

== Release ==
=== Critical reception ===
The film was screened out of competition at the 1981 Cannes Film Festival. Honeysuckle Rose holds a 60% rating on Rotten Tomatoes based on six reviews. Wide Open Country music magazine ranked it the second best Willie Nelson film, behind Red Headed Stranger.

Film critic Roger Ebert called the film "sly and entertaining" yet ultimately predictable and disappointing:

The movie remains resolutely at the level of superficial cliché, resisting any temptation to make a serious statement about the character's hard-drinking, self-destructive lifestyle...Honeysuckle Rose has the kind of problems that can be resolved with an onstage reconciliation in the last scene: Willie and Dyan singing a duet together and everybody knowing things will turn out all right.

Regarding Willie Nelson's performance, Janet Maslin wrote in the New York Times:

Mr. Nelson doesn't entirely fit his role, any more than the other actors fit theirs. He seems too odd, too solitary, for all the intimacy forced upon him by the story line. But he brings tremendous authority to every gesture, and his character is the only thing in the movie about which the audience is bound to want to know more. Mr. Nelson accomplishes all this in a role with very little dialogue, which makes his sheer force of personality seem all the more impressive.

=== Box-office ===
Honeysuckle Rose opened theatrically in 826 venues on July 18, 1980, and earned $2,189,966 in its first weekend, ranking third in the domestic box office. Ultimately, the film grossed $17,815,212. Variety put its domestic rentals at $9 million. The film made a substantial amount of its total revenue from a presale of television rights to NBC for just under $5 million, which made it profitable.

=== Accolades ===
Award	Category	Nominee(s)	Result
Academy Awards	Best Original Song	"On the Road Again"; Music and Lyrics by Willie Nelson	Nominated
Golden Raspberry Awards	Worst Supporting Actress	Amy Irving	Won
Stinkers Bad Movie Awards	Worst Supporting Actress	Amy Irving	Nominated

The film is recognized by American Film Institute in these lists:

- 2004: AFI's 100 Years...100 Songs:
  - "On the Road Again" – Nominated

== Soundtrack ==
A soundtrack was released by CBS in 1980.

=== Charts ===
Chart (1980)	Position
Australia (Kent Music Report)	34
