= B. J. Baker =

Singer and songwriter

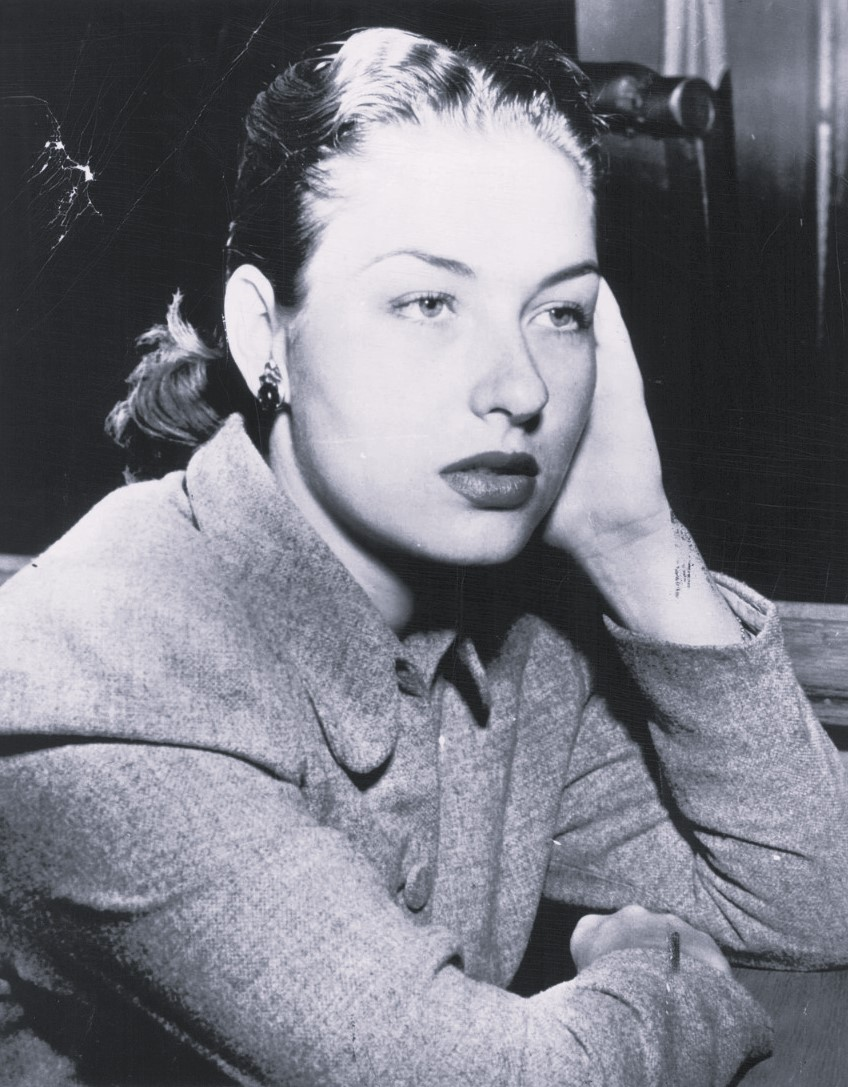
- Baker in 1949
- Born: Betty Jane Phillips; May 6, 1927; Birmingham, Alabama, U.S.
- Died: April 2, 2002 (aged 74); Rancho Mirage, California, U.S.
- Occupations: Singer; songwriter; vocal contractor
- Years active: 1944–2002
- Spouses: Mickey Rooney (m. 1944; div. 1949) Buddy Baker (m. 1950; div. 1957) Barney Kessel (m. 1961; div. 1980)
- Children: Mickey Rooney Jr. Tim Rooney
- Musical career
- Genres: Pop
- Instruments: Vocals

Betty Jane Baker (née Phillips; May 6, 1927 – April 2, 2002) was an American singer, songwriter, and vocal contractor, who worked as a backup singer on recordings by Elvis Presley, Frank Sinatra, Bobby Darin, the Righteous Brothers, and Sam Cooke, among others. She also sang on the radio with big bands, did voice work for television and films, and appeared on television variety shows.

== Early life and career ==
Born in Birmingham, Alabama, Baker was Miss Alabama in 1944 as Betty Jane Rase, and was the fourth runner-up in the 1944 Miss America Pageant.

From the 1940s, Baker sang in big bands and on the radio, and in the 1960s, she appeared in several television shows, including the variety shows of Dean Martin and Judy Garland. She backed Elvis Presley in his recording of "Can't Help Falling in Love", Lloyd Price in "Stagger Lee", Sam Cooke in "You Send Me", Bobby Darin in "Dream Lover", Frank Sinatra in "That's Life", Jackie Wilson in "Baby Workout", the Righteous Brothers in "You've Lost That Lovin' Feelin'", and Nancy Sinatra on her 1969 album Nancy. She recorded extensively with the Anita Kerr Singers.

In addition to her studio singing, Baker was the singing voice of Linda Low (played by Nancy Kwan) in the 1961 film version of Flower Drum Song and also lent her voice to The Story of Babar, the Little Elephant (1968 TV movie), Babar Comes to America (1971 TV movie), and Heidi's Song (1982). She sang two songs ("(Won't You Come Home) Bill Bailey" and "The Rockenschpeel Jingle") as the character Wilma in the second season of The Flintstones episode, "The Happy Household".

Baker was also well regarded as a vocal contractor for backup singers.

== Personal life ==
Baker was first married to Mickey Rooney (1920–2014) from 1944 to 1949; the couple had two children, Mickey Rooney Jr. (1945–2022) and Tim Rooney (1947–2006). She was later married to composer Buddy Baker (1918–2002) from 1950 to 1957, and jazz guitarist Barney Kessel (1923–2004) from 1961 until their divorce in 1980.

== Death ==
She died on April 2, 2002, at the age of 74, in Rancho Mirage, California, from complications following a stroke.

Awards and achievements
Preceded by Toula Hagestratou	Miss Alabama; 1944	Succeeded by Frances Dorn
