= Mickey Rooney Jr. =

American actor (1945–2022)

- Born: Ninnian Joseph Yule III; July 3, 1945; Birmingham, Alabama, U.S.
- Died: July 16, 2022 (aged 77); Glendale, Arizona, U.S.
- Occupation: Actor
- Years active: 1955–1980
- Spouses: Merci Montello (m. 1967; div. 1986) Laura Hollander (m. 1986; died 2006) Christi L. Brown (m. 2007)
- Parents: Mickey Rooney (father); B. J. Baker (mother)
- Relatives: Tim Rooney (brother); Michael Rooney (half-brother)

Mickey Rooney Jr. (born Ninnian Joseph Yule III; July 3, 1945 – July 16, 2022) was an American actor. He was the eldest son of the actor Mickey Rooney, and operated the Rooney Entertainment Group, a film and television production company. He was a born-again Christian who had an evangelical ministry in Hemet, California.

== Early life and career ==
Rooney was born on July 3, 1945, in Birmingham, Alabama, to actor Mickey Rooney (1920–2014) and a past Miss Birmingham and singer Betty Jane Rase (1927–2002).

After appearing as a "Mouseketeer" in The Mickey Mouse Club in 1955 along with his brother Tim, he played his first film role in 1967 in Hot Rods to Hell. He later appeared in the television film Beyond the Bermuda Triangle in 1975 and in the film Honeysuckle Rose in 1980.

== Personal life and death ==
Rooney once was married to Playboy Playmate of the Month, Merci Montello. Rooney married Rowena Ramsey on August 27, 1976. Rooney met Laura Hollander in 1986 and they married on December 30, 1986. They were married until her death in 2006.

He lived with his last wife Christi L. Brown and family in Hemet, California for 14 years and then they moved to Glendale, Arizona. Rooney died at his home in Glendale, Arizona, on July 16, 2022, 13 days after his 77th birthday.

== Filmography ==
=== Film ===
Year	Title	Role	Notes
1967	Hot Rods to Hell	Combo Leader	
1975	Beyond the Bermunda Triangle		TV film
1980	Honeysuckle Rose	Cotton Roberts	

=== Television ===
Year	Title	Role	Notes
1955–1959, 1980	The Mickey Mouse Club	Himself	First season and special
1964	I've Got a Secret	Himself	
1964	Shindig!		
