= Kenneth Threadgill =

American country singer and tavern owner (1909–1987)

Kenneth Threadgill (September 12, 1909 – March 20, 1987) was an American country singer and tavern owner, who mentored the early Austin folk music scene that included Janis Joplin. He also lent his name to two nationally famous restaurant/bar venues.

== Early life & yodeling ==
Born John Kenneth Threadgill in Peniel, Texas. His father was an itinerant minister who worked between Hunt County, Texas and New Mexico. The family lived in Beaumont and in 1923 moved to Austin, where Threadgill attended Austin High School. Later he met mentor and idol, Jimmie Rodgers while working at the Tivoli Theater in Beaumont. Backstage, Threadgill impressed Rodgers with his yodeling and eventually Threadgill incorporated yodeling into his country singing act to create his own popular style.

== Threadgill's Tavern ==
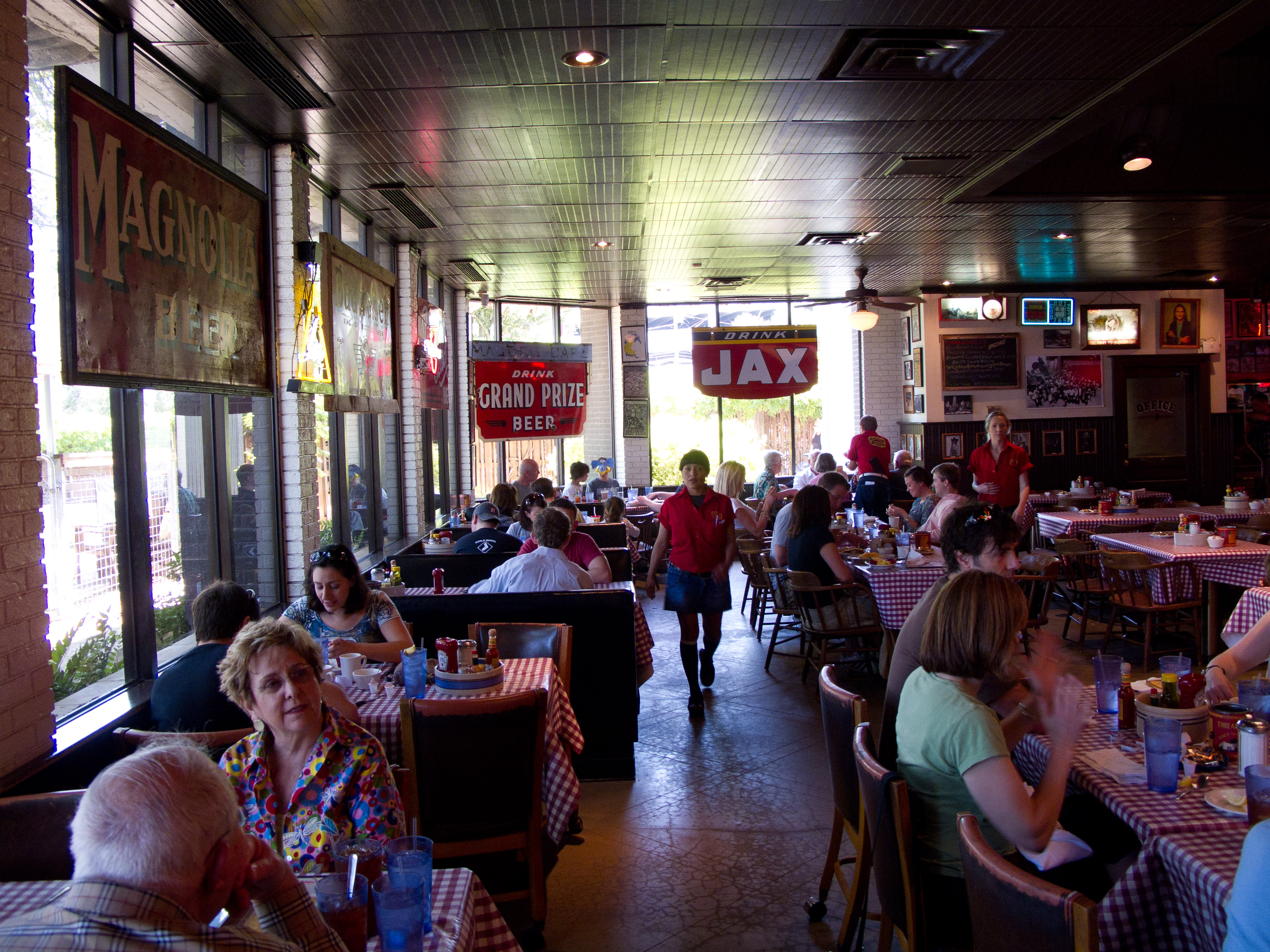
Threadgill's South 1996-2018

In 1933 he moved back to Austin and began working at a Gulf service station on North Lamar Boulevard. In December when Prohibition ended Threadgill bought the establishment, secured the first post-Prohibition beer license in Austin and opened it as Threadgill's Tavern. Threadgill and his wife, Mildred (Greer), ran the restaurant and tavern until World War II, when they closed for a few years. While Threadgill worked as a welder for the war effort, the music did not totally stop. When Hank Williams came through Austin and did a show at the Dessau Dance Hall, northeast of Austin, Threadgill was there. Hank was late, so Kenneth took the stage and was singing "Lovesick Blues" when Hank arrived. Hank came onstage and finished the show.

By the mid forties Threadgill was selling soft drinks and beer while his friends played and sang hillbilly blues. In the mid fifties groups of local musicians were coming every week to play, and Threadgill would pay them with two rounds of free beer. This tradition of paying singers with tavern fare was echoed later in the 'Sitting and Singing for Supper' sessions. In the beginning there was no stage and performers played right sitting amongst the customers. "A microphone connected to little amp would be passed around to performers. Eventually Threadgill install a sound system and musicians would wait in the back for their turn.

== Post World War II & Janis Joplin ==
After World War II Threadgill’s Tavern reopened and UT students came to the tavern to hear Threadgill and his Hootenanny Hoots play. Threadgill’s open-mic nights became popular and helped form the basis of the fledgling singer-songwriter community in Austin. Two musicians from the Hootenanny Hoots, encountered Janis Joplin while driving in Austin and invited her to Threadgill's. She came and sang and soon Joplin became the star attraction for the Wednesday open-mic. Eventually she became a close friend of Kenneth and his wife Mildred. In 1970 a concert near Oak Hill was held to celebrate Threadgill's birthday. Janis Joplin, who by this time was a major star, had been in Hawaii the day before, canceled a $15,000 appearance to fly to Austin for the occasion. Joplin and Threadgill sang and danced for the crowd. Threadgill's birthday picnic was noted in the Congressional Record when Congressman J. J. Pickle called Threadgill the "Father of Austin Country Music". After Mildred's death in 1974, Threadgill closed the club and later sold it to Eddie Wilson, the owner of Armadillo World Headquarters. Wilson reopened Threadgill's as a restaurant on December 31, 1981. As late as June 1983 Threadgill continued to entertain at the restaurant, singing and yodeling on most Wednesdays evenings.

== Music and movie ==
In the early 1980s, Threadgill and Willie Nelson appeared together and sang in the movie Honeysuckle Rose. In September 1981 "Silver Haired Daddy" with Renee Best, Steve Mendell, Bill and Bonnie Hearne and Johnny Gimble was released on Armadillo Records. It was recorded at Onion Audio and produced by Michael J. Osborne and Hank Alrich. His work showed the early influences of Jimmie Rodgers ballads and Al Jolson movies, which were could be seen in his singing and dancing. Some of his best-known songs were "Silver-Haired Daddy of Mine," and "T for Texas, T for Tennessee."

== Death and legacy ==
Threadgill died from a pulmonary embolism on March 20, 1987, at Brackenridge Hospital in Austin; he was 77. The city of Greenville (which annexed Threadgill's hometown of Peniel in 1957) hosts the Kenneth Threadgill Concert Series in his honor. He was inducted into the Austin Music Memorial in 2010. A second Threadgill's opened as a restaurant by Eddie Wilson in 1996. Kenneth Threadgill's reputation for good food and great music continues in Austin according to Austin Chronicle music writer, Margaret Moser. As of 2020, both Threadgill's locations are now permanently closed.

== Discography ==
=== Soundtrack albums ===
List of albums, with selected chart positions and certifications, showing other relevant details
Title	Album details	Peak chart positions					Certifications
Title	Album details	US	US Country	AUS	CAN	CAN Country	Certifications
Honeysuckle Rose (credited as "Willie Nelson and Family")	Released: July 18, 1980; Label: Columbia; Formats: LP, cassette	11	1	34	24	4	MC: Gold; RIAA: Platinum
