= Honeysuckle Rose (album) =

Soundtrack album by Willie Nelson and Family
- Released: July 18, 1980
- Genre: Country
- Length: 72:19
- Label: Columbia
- Producer: Willie Nelson

Willie Nelson chronology
San Antonio Rose (1980)	Honeysuckle Rose (1980)	Family Bible (1980)

Honeysuckle Rose is the soundtrack to the 1980 musical drama film of the same name, which stars Willie Nelson. Tracks on the album include songs by Nelson and various artists including Kenneth Threadgill, Emmylou Harris, Johnny Gimble, Hank Cochran, Jeannie Seely and Dyan Cannon.

The song "On the Road Again" was nominated for Best Original Song in the 53rd Academy Awards.

Professional ratings
Review scores
Source	Rating
Allmusic	link

== Track listing ==
All songs written by Willie Nelson, except where noted.

Side one
No.	Title	Writer(s)	Length
1.	"On the Road Again" (Live)		2:38
2.	"Pick Up the Tempo"		2:39
3.	"Heaven or Hell""		2:20
4.	"Fiddlin' Around" (featuring Johnny Gimble)	Johnny Gimble	3:26
5.	"Blue Eyes Crying in the Rain"	Fred Rose	2:49
6.	"Working Man Blues"	Merle Haggard	3:41

Side two
No.	Title	Writer(s)	Length
1.	"Jumpin' Cotton Eyed Joe" (featuring Johnny Gimble)	Gimble	2:53
2.	"Whiskey River"	Johnny Bush	3:57
3.	"Bloody Mary Morning" (Live)		3:43
4.	"Loving You Was Easier (Than Anything I'll Ever Do Again)"	Kris Kristofferson	3:46
5.	"I Don't Do Windows" (featuring Hank Cochran)	Hank Cochran	3:22
6.	"Coming Back to Texas" (featuring Kenneth Threadgill)	Kenneth Threadgill	2:21

Side three
No.	Title	Writer(s)	Length
1.	"If You Want Me To Love You I Will"	Amy Irving	1:31
2.	"It's Not Supposed to Be That Way"		3:22
3.	"You Show Me Yours (And I'll Show You Mine)" (featuring Amy Irving)	Kristofferson	3:16
4.	"If You Could Touch Her at All"	Lee Clayton	3:29
5.	"Angel Flying Too Close to the Ground"		4:26
6.	"I Guess I've Come to Live Here in Your Eyes"		3:23

Side four
No.	Title	Writer(s)	Length
1.	"Angel Eyes" (featuring Emmylou Harris)	Rodney Crowell	2:42
2.	"So You Think You're a Cowboy" (featuring Emmylou Harris)	Harris	2:29
3.	"Make the World Go Away" (featuring Hank Cochran and Jeannie Seely)	Cochran	2:40
4.	"Two Sides to Every Story"	Cannon	3:08
5.	"A Song for You" (Live)	Leon Russell	2:35
6.	"Uncloudy Day"	J. K. Alwood	4:18

== Personnel ==
- Dyan Cannon – performer
- Johnny Gimble – performer
- Emmylou Harris – performer
- Hank Cochran – performer
- Kenneth Threadgill – performer
- Amy Irving – performer
- Willie Nelson – guitar, vocals, producer, main performer
- Chris Ethridge – bass
- Jody Payne – performer
- Bradley Hartman – engineer, mixing
- Jeannie Seely – performer
- Rex W Ludwick - performer

== Charts ==
Chart (1980)	Peak position
Australian Albums Chart	34
Canada Top Albums/CDs (RPM)	24
Canada Country Albums (RPM)	1
US Billboard 200	11
US Top Country Albums (Billboard)	1
