= Mickey Rooney =

American actor (1920–2014)

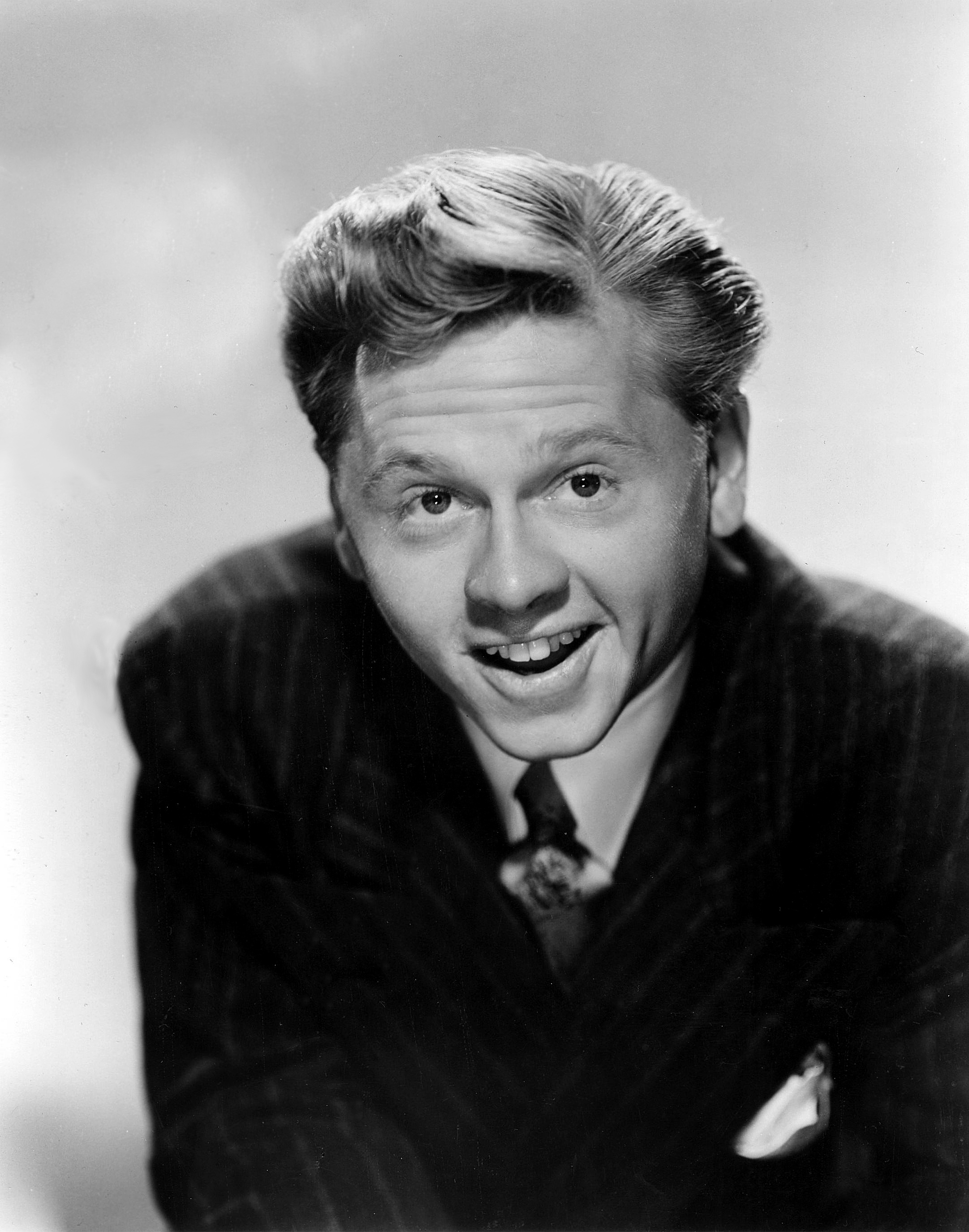
- Rooney in 1940
- Born: Ninnian Joseph Yule Jr. September 23, 1920; New York City, U.S.
- Died: April 6, 2014 (aged 93); Los Angeles, California, U.S.
- Resting place: Hollywood Forever Cemetery
- Other name: Mickey Maguire
- Occupations: Actor; film producer; radio entertainer; vaudevillian
- Years active: 1926–2014
- Notable work: Full list
- Height: 5 ft 3 in (160 cm)
- Spouses: Ava Gardner (m. 1942; div. 1943); B.J. Phillips (m. 1944; div. 1949); Martha Vickers (m. 1949; div. 1951); Elaine Devry (m. 1952; div. 1958); Barbara Ann Thomason (m. 1958; died 1966); Marge Lane (m. 1966; div. 1967); Carolyn Hockett (m. 1969; div. 1975); Jan Chamberlin (m. 1978; sep. 2012)
- Children: 9, including Tim, Michael, and Mickey Jr.
- Father: Joe Yule
- Military career
- Allegiance: United States
- Branch: United States Army
- Service years: 1944–1946
- War: World War II
- Awards: Bronze Star

Mickey Rooney (born Ninnian Joseph Yule Jr.; September 23, 1920 – April 6, 2014) was an American actor. In a career spanning nearly nine decades, he appeared in more than 300 films and was among the last surviving stars of the silent-film era. He was the top box-office attraction from 1939 to 1941, and one of the best-paid actors of that era. At the height of a career ultimately marked by declines and comebacks, Rooney performed the role of Andy Hardy in a series of 16 films in the 1930s and 1940s that epitomized the mainstream United States self-image.

At the peak of his career between ages 15 and 25, he made 43 films, and was one of Metro-Goldwyn-Mayer's most consistently successful actors. A versatile performer, he became a celebrated character actor later in his career. Laurence Olivier once said he considered Rooney "the best there has ever been". Clarence Brown, who directed him in two of his earliest dramatic roles in National Velvet and The Human Comedy, said Rooney was "the closest thing to a genius" with whom he had ever worked. He won a Golden Globe Award in 1982 and an Emmy Award in the same year for the title role in a television movie Bill and was awarded the Academy Honorary Award in 1982.

Rooney first performed in vaudeville as a child actor, and made his film debut at the age of six. He played the title character in the "Mickey McGuire" series of 78 short films, from age seven to 13. At 14 and 15, he played Puck in the play and subsequent film adaptation of A Midsummer Night's Dream. At the age of 16, he began playing Andy Hardy, and gained his first recognition at 17 as Whitey Marsh in Boys Town. At the 12th Academy Awards, when he was 19 years old, Rooney became the second-youngest Best Actor in a Leading Role nominee and the first teenager to be nominated for an Academy Award for his performance as Mickey Moran in the 1939 film adaptation of the coming-of-age Broadway musical Babes in Arms; he was awarded a special Academy Juvenile Award in 1939. Rooney received his second Academy Award nomination in the same category for his role as Homer Macauley in The Human Comedy.

Drafted into the military during World War II, Rooney served nearly two years, entertaining over two million troops on stage and radio. He was awarded a Bronze Star for performing in combat zones. Returning in 1945, he was too old for juvenile roles, but too short at 5 ft 3 in (160 cm) for most adult roles, and was unable to gain as many starring roles. However, numerous low-budget, but critically well-received, pictures through the mid-1950s had Rooney playing lead dramatic roles in what were later regarded as films noir. Rooney's career was renewed with well-received supporting performances in films such as The Bold and the Brave (1956), Requiem for a Heavyweight (1962), It's a Mad, Mad, Mad, Mad World (1963), Pete's Dragon (1977), and The Black Stallion (1979). Rooney received Academy Award nominations for Best Actor in a Supporting Role in 1957 for The Bold and the Brave, and 1980 for The Black Stallion. In the early 1980s, he returned to Broadway in Sugar Babies, a role that earned him nominations for Tony Award and Drama Desk Award for Best Actor in a Leading Role in a Musical. He made hundreds of appearances on TV, including dramas, variety programs, and talk shows.

== Early life ==
Ninnian Joseph Yule Jr. was born in Brooklyn, New York on September 23, 1920. He is the only child of Nellie W. Carter and Joe Yule. His mother was an American former chorus girl and burlesque performer from Kansas City, Missouri, while his father was a Scottish-born vaudevillian, who had immigrated to New York from Glasgow with his family at the age of three months. They lived in the Greenpoint neighborhood of Brooklyn. When Rooney was born, his parents were appearing together in a Brooklyn production of A Gaiety Girl. He later recounted in his memoirs that he began performing at the age of 17 months as part of his parents' routine, wearing a specially tailored tuxedo.

== Career ==
=== 1924–1926: Career beginnings as a child actor ===
Rooney's parents separated when he was four years old in 1924, and he and his mother moved to Hollywood the following year. He made his first film appearance at age six in 1926, in the short Not to be Trusted. Rooney got bit parts in films such as The Beast of the City (1932) and The Life of Jimmy Dolan (1933), which allowed him to work alongside stars such as Joel McCrea, Colleen Moore, Clark Gable, Douglas Fairbanks Jr., John Wayne, and Jean Harlow. He enrolled in the Hollywood Professional School and later attended Fairfax High School.

=== 1927–1936: Mickey McGuire ===
His mother saw an advertisement for a child to play the role of "Mickey McGuire" in a series of short films. Rooney got the role and became "Mickey" for 78 of the films, running from 1927 to 1936, starting with Mickey's Circus (1927), his first starring role. (Note: The film was long believed lost, but in 2014 was reported found in the Netherlands.) (Note: The Mickey McGuire films were adapted from the Toonerville Trolley comic strip by Fontaine Fox, which contained a character named Mickey McGuire. Joe Yule briefly became Mickey McGuire legally to "trump an attempted copyright lawsuit so the film producer Larry Darmour would not have to pay the comic-strip writers royalties". His mother also changed her surname to McGuire in an attempt to bolster the argument, but the film producers lost. The litigation settlement awarded damages to the owners of the cartoon character, compelling the 12-year-old actor to refrain from calling himself Mickey McGuire on- and off-screen. During an interruption in the series in 1932, Mrs. Yule made plans to take her son on a 10-week vaudeville tour as McGuire, and Fox sued successfully to stop him from using the name. Mrs. Yule suggested the stage name of Mickey Looney for her comedian son. He altered this to Rooney, which did not infringe upon the copyright of Warner Bros.' animation series called Looney Tunes.) During this period, he also briefly voiced Oswald the Lucky Rabbit for Walter Lantz Productions. He made other films in his adolescence, including several more of the McGuire films. At age 14, he played the role of Puck in the Warner Bros. all-star adaptation of A Midsummer Night's Dream in 1935. Critic David Thomson hailed his performance as "one of the cinema's most arresting pieces of magic". Rooney then moved to MGM, where he befriended Judy Garland, with whom he began making a series of musicals that propelled both of them to stardom.

=== 1937–1944: Andy Hardy films and Hollywood stardom ===
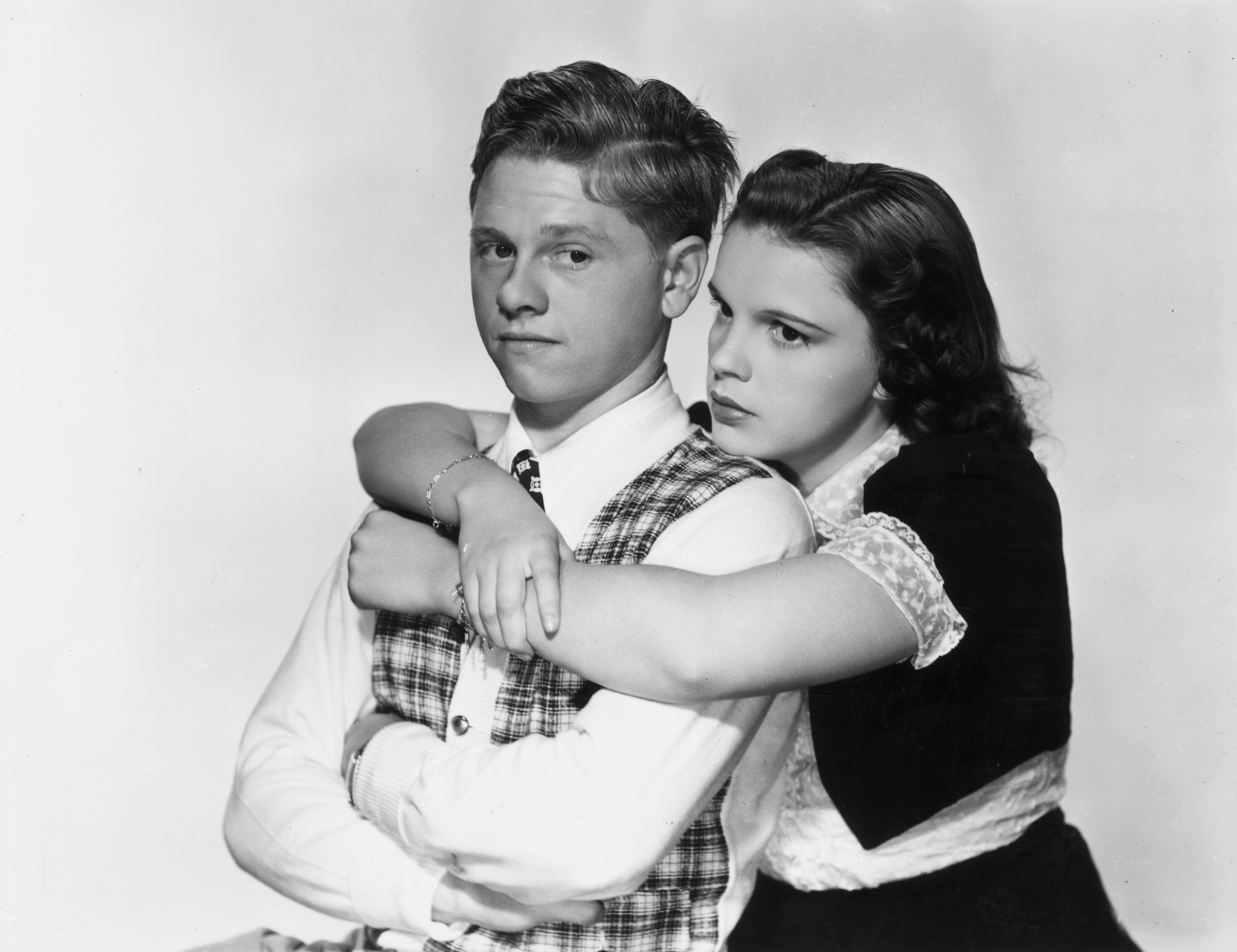
Rooney with Judy Garland in Love Finds Andy Hardy (1938)

In 1937, Rooney was selected to portray Andy Hardy in A Family Affair, which MGM had planned as a B-movie. Rooney provided comic relief as the son of Judge James K. Hardy, portrayed by Lionel Barrymore (although former silent-film leading man Lewis Stone played the role of Judge Hardy in subsequent pictures). The film was an unexpected success, and led to 13 more Andy Hardy films between 1937 and 1946, and a final film in 1958.

According to author Barry Monush, MGM wanted the Andy Hardy films to appeal to all family members. Rooney's character portrayed a typical "anxious, hyperactive, girl-crazy teenager", and he soon became the unintended main star of the films. Although some critics describe the series of films as "sweet, overly idealized, and pretty much interchangeable," their ultimate success was because they gave viewers a "comforting portrait of small-town America that seemed suited for the times", with Rooney instilling "a lasting image of what every parent wished their teen could be like".

Behind the scenes, however, Rooney was like the "hyperactive girl-crazy teenager" he portrayed on the screen. Wallace Beery, his co-star in Stablemates, described him as a "brat", but a "fine actor". MGM head Louis B. Mayer found it necessary to manage Rooney's public image, explains historian Jane Ellen Wayne:

Mayer naturally tried to keep all his child actors in line, like any father figure. After one such episode, Mickey Rooney replied, "I won't do it. You're asking the impossible." Mayer then grabbed young Rooney by his lapels and said, "Listen to me! I don't care what you do in private. Just don't do it in public. In public, behave. Your fans expect it. You're Andy Hardy! You're the United States! You're the Stars and Stripes. Behave yourself! You're a symbol!" Mickey nodded. "I'll be good, Mr. Mayer. I promise you that." Mayer let go of his lapels, "All right," he said.

Fifty years later, Rooney realized in hindsight that these early confrontations with Mayer were necessary for him to develop into a leading film star: "Everybody butted heads with him, but he listened and you listened. And then you'd come to an agreement you could both live with. ... He visited the sets, he gave people talks ... What he wanted was something that was American, presented in a cosmopolitan manner."

Spencer Tracy and Rooney in a scene from Boys Town (1938)

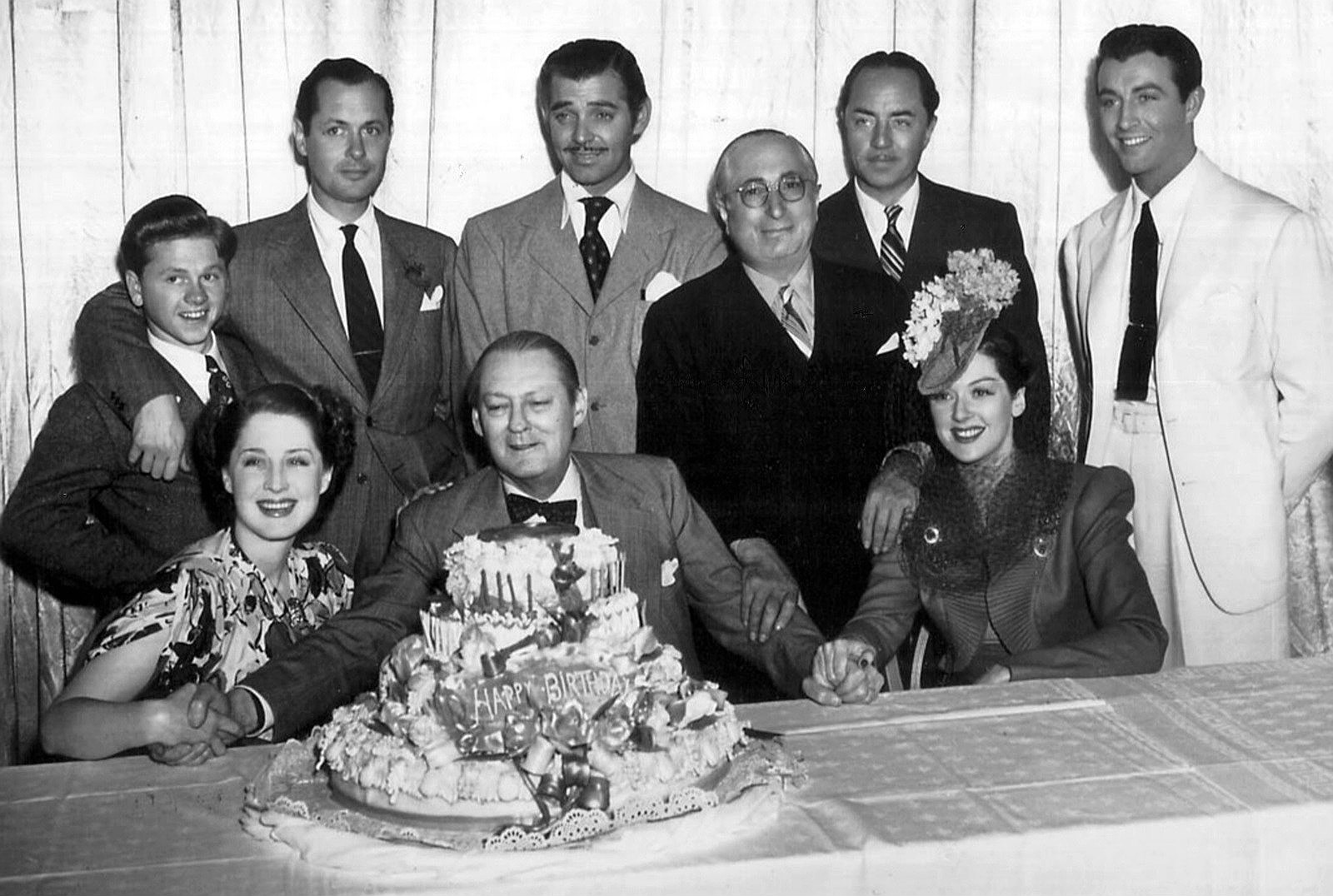
Lionel Barrymore's 61st birthday in 1939, standing: Mickey Rooney, Robert Montgomery, Clark Gable, Louis B. Mayer, William Powell, Robert Taylor, seated: Norma Shearer, Lionel Barrymore, and Rosalind Russell

In 1937, Rooney made his first film alongside Judy Garland with Thoroughbreds Don't Cry. Garland and Rooney became close friends as they co-starred in future films and became a successful song-and-dance team. Audiences delighted in seeing the "playful interactions between the two stars showcase a wonderful chemistry". Along with three of the Andy Hardy films, where she portrayed a girl attracted to Andy, they appeared together in a string of successful musicals, including coming-of-age musical Babes in Arms (1939). For his performance as Mickey Moran, 19-year-old Mickey Rooney was nominated for an Academy Award for Best Actor in a Leading Role, becoming the second-youngest Best Actor nominee. During an interview in the 1992 documentary film MGM: When the Lion Roars, Rooney describes their friendship:

Judy and I were so close we could've come from the same womb. We weren't like brothers or sisters but there was no love affair there; there was more than a love affair. It's very, very difficult to explain the depths of our love for each other. It was so special. It was a forever love. Judy, as we speak, has not died. She's always with me in every heartbeat of my body.

In 1937, Rooney received top billing as Shockey Carter in Hoosier Schoolboy, but his breakthrough role as a dramatic actor came in 1938's Boys Town opposite Spencer Tracy as Father Flanagan, who runs a home for wayward and homeless boys. 18-year-old Rooney and 17-year-old Deanna Durbin were awarded a special Juvenile Academy Award in 1939, for "significant contribution in bringing to the screen the spirit and personification of youth". Jane Ellen Wayne describes one of the "most famous scenes" in the film, where tough young Rooney is playing poker with a cigarette in his mouth, his hat is cocked, and his feet are up on the table. "Tracy grabs him by the lapels, throws the cigarette away, and pushes him into a chair. 'That's better,' he tells Mickey." Louis B. Mayer said Boys Town was his favorite film during his years at MGM.

Rooney was the biggest box-office draw in 1939, 1940, and 1941. For their roles in Boys Town, Rooney and Tracy won first and second place in the Motion Picture Herald 1940 National Poll of Exhibitors, based on the box-office appeal of 200 players. A contributor to Boys' Life magazine wrote, "Congratulations to Messrs. Rooney and Tracy! Also to Metro-Goldwyn-Mayer we extend a hearty thanks for their very considerable part in this outstanding achievement." Actor Laurence Olivier once called Rooney "the greatest actor of them all". He appeared on the cover of Time magazine in 1940, timed to coincide with the release of Young Tom Edison; the cover story began:

Hollywood's No. 1 box office bait in 1939 was not Clark Gable, Errol Flynn, or Tyrone Power, but a rope-haired, kazoo-voiced kid with a comic-strip face, who until this week had never appeared in a picture without mugging or overacting it. His name (assumed) was Mickey Rooney, and to a large part of the more articulate U.S. cinema audience, his name was becoming a frequently used synonym for brat.

During his long career, Rooney also worked with many of the screen's female stars, including Elizabeth Taylor in National Velvet (1944), Marilyn Monroe in The Fireball (1950), Grace Kelly in The Bridges at Toko-Ri (1954) and Audrey Hepburn in Breakfast at Tiffany's (1961). Rooney's "bumptiousness and boyish charm" as an actor developed more "smoothness and polish" over the years, writes biographer Scott Eyman. The fact that Rooney fully enjoyed his life as an actor played a large role in those changes:

You weren't going to work, you were going to have fun. It was home, everybody was cohesive; it was family. One year I made nine pictures; I had to go from one set to another. It was like I was on a conveyor belt. You did not read a script and say, "I guess I'll do it." You did it. They had people that knew the kind of stories that were suited to you. It was a conveyor belt that made motion pictures.

Clarence Brown, who directed Rooney in his Oscar-nominated performance in The Human Comedy (1943) and again in National Velvet (1944), enjoyed working with Rooney in films:

Mickey Rooney is the closest thing to a genius that I ever worked with. There was Chaplin, then there was Rooney. The little bastard could do no wrong in my book ... All you had to do with him was rehearse it once.

=== Military service and later film career ===
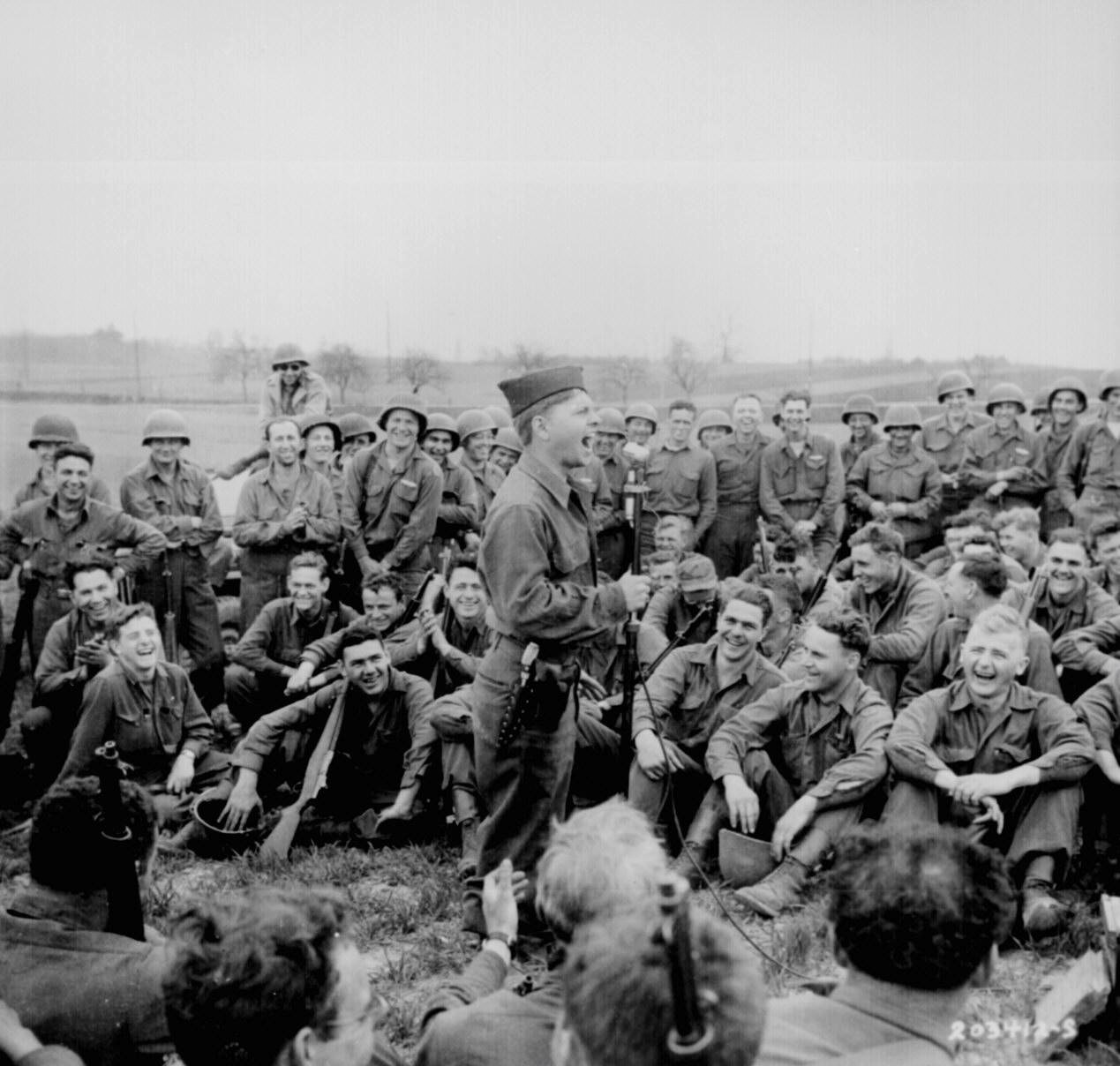
Rooney entertains American troops in Germany, April 1945

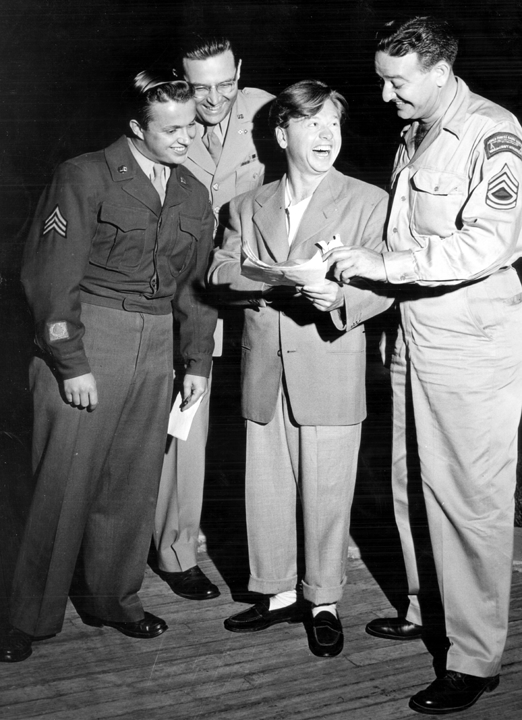
Rooney with Tom Poston (right) circa 1940s

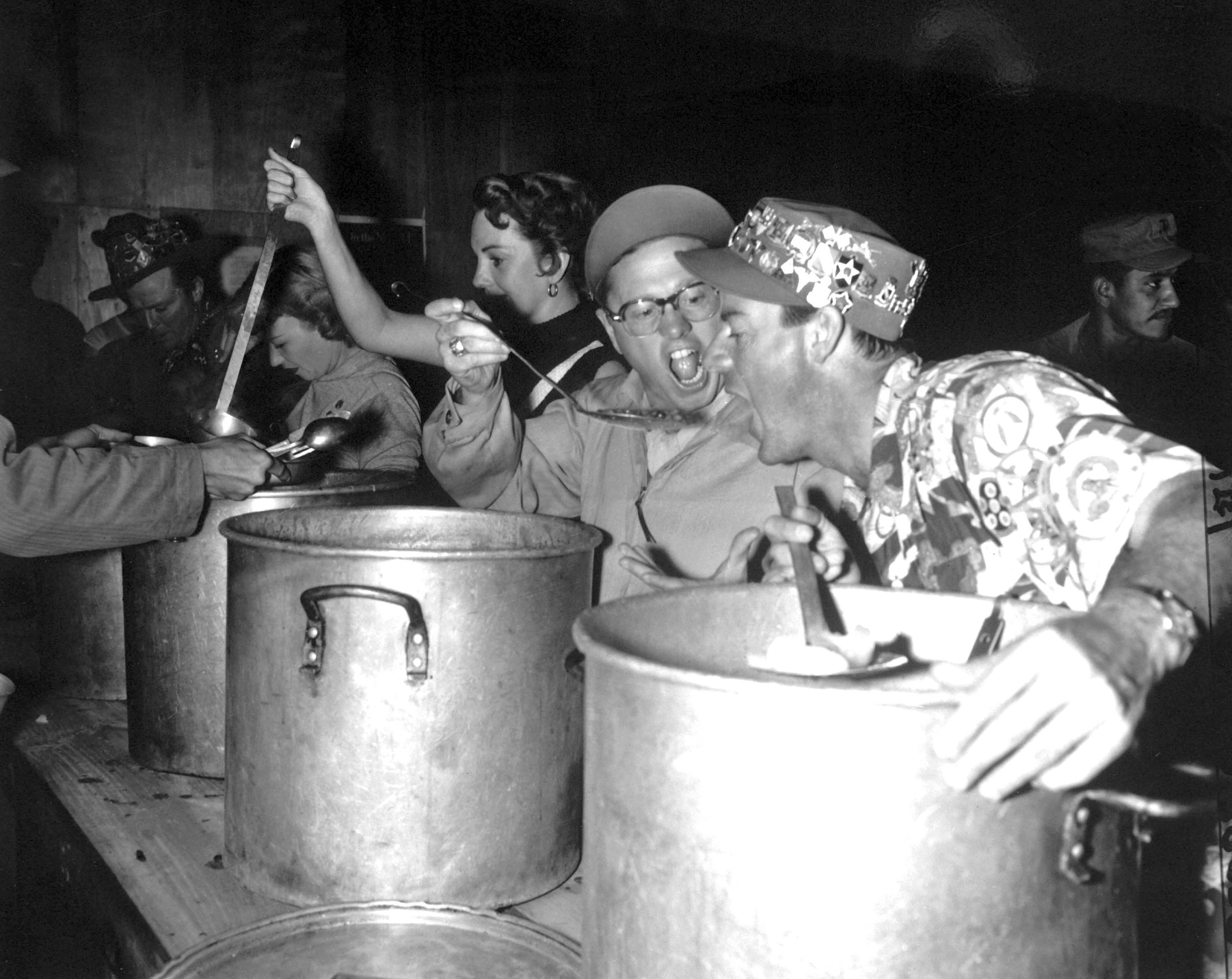
Rooney feeds the troops for the USO in 1952.

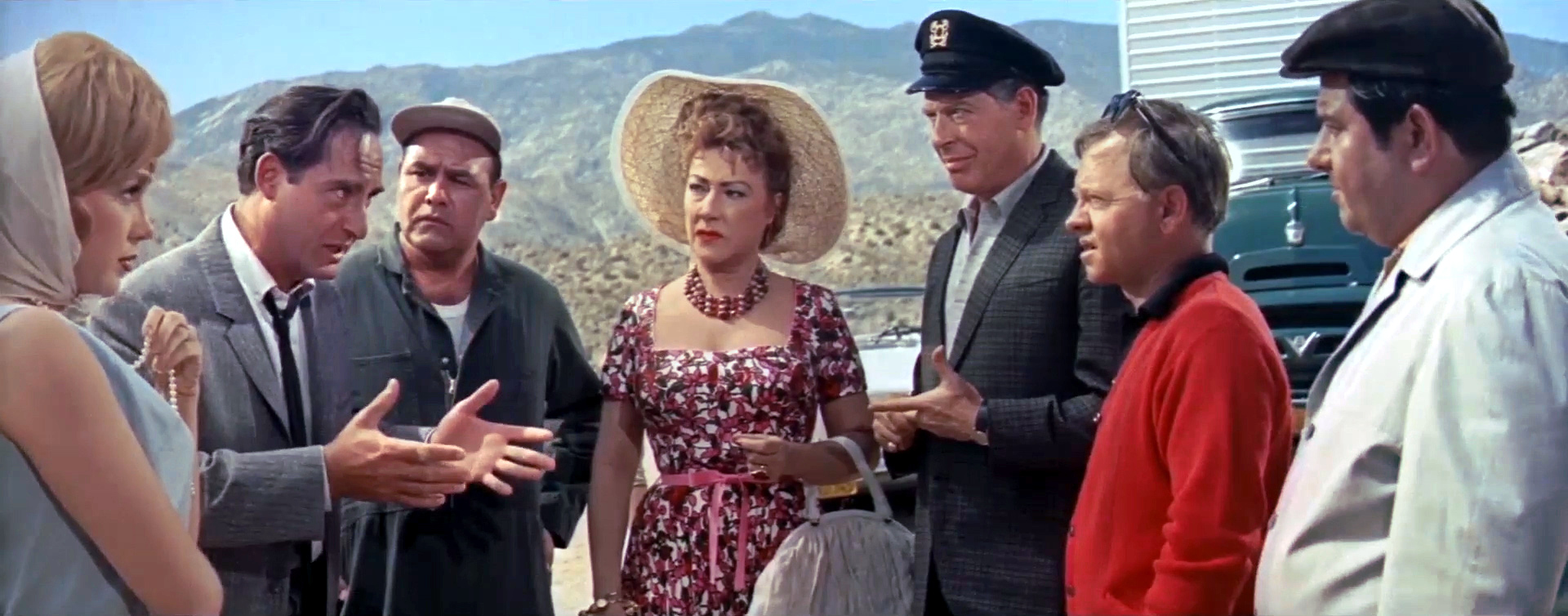
Left to right: Edie Adams, Sid Caesar, Jonathan Winters, Ethel Merman, Milton Berle, Mickey Rooney and Buddy Hackett in It's a Mad, Mad, Mad, Mad World (1963)

In June 1944, Rooney was inducted into the United States Army. He served more than 21 months (until shortly after the end of World War II), entertaining the troops in America and Europe in Special Services Jeep Shows. He spent part of the time as a radio personality on the American Forces Network, and was awarded the Bronze Star Medal for entertaining troops in combat zones. In addition, Rooney also received the Army Good Conduct Medal, American Campaign Medal, European-African-Middle Eastern Campaign Medal, and World War II Victory Medal, for his military service.

Rooney's career declined after his return to civilian life. He was now an adult with a height of only 5 feet 1 inch (1.55 m) according to his 1942 draft registration, and he could no longer play the role of a teenager, but he also lacked the stature of a leading man. He appeared in the film Words and Music in 1948, which paired him for the last time with Garland on film (he appeared with her on one episode as a guest on The Judy Garland Show). He briefly starred in a CBS radio series, Shorty Bell, in the summer of 1948, and reprised his role as Andy Hardy, with most of the original cast, in a syndicated radio version of The Hardy Family in 1949 and 1950 (repeated on Mutual during 1952).

In 1949, Variety reported a renegotiation of Rooney's deal with MGM. He agreed to make one film a year for them for five years at $25,000 a movie (his fee until then had been $100,000, but Rooney wanted to enter independent production.) Rooney claimed he was unhappy with the billing MGM gave him for Words and Music, but his career was at a low point. His New York Times obituary reported, "at one point in 1950, the only job he could get was touring Southern states with the Hadacol Caravan", promoting a patent medicine that was later forced off the market.

His first television series, The Mickey Rooney Show, also known as Hey, Mulligan, was created by Blake Edwards with Rooney as his own producer, and appeared on NBC television for 32 episodes from August 1954 to June 1955. In 1951, he made his directorial debut with My True Story, starring Helen Walker. Rooney also starred as a ragingly egomaniacal television comedian, in the live 90-minute television drama The Comedian, in the Playhouse 90 series on the evening of Valentine's Day in 1957, and as himself in a 1960 revue called The Musical Revue of 1959, based on the 1929 film The Hollywood Revue of 1929. In May 1956, Sequoia University awarded Rooney an honorary degree of PhD in Fine Arts for his work.

In 1958, Rooney joined Dean Martin and Frank Sinatra in hosting an episode of NBC's short-lived Club Oasis comedy and variety show. In 1960, Rooney directed and starred in The Private Lives of Adam and Eve, an ambitious comedy known for its multiple flashbacks and many cameos. In the 1960s, Rooney returned to theatrical entertainment. He accepted film roles in undistinguished films, but still appeared in more prestigious works, such as Requiem for a Heavyweight (1962) and It's a Mad, Mad, Mad, Mad World (1963).

He portrayed a Japanese character, Mr. Yunioshi, in the 1961 film version of Truman Capote's novella Breakfast at Tiffany's. When his performance was criticized by some in subsequent years as a racist caricature, Rooney contended that he would not have taken the role if he had known it would offend people.

In 1961, Rooney appeared on television's What's My Line?, and mentioned that he had already started enrolling students in the Mickey Rooney School of Entertainment. His school venture never came to fruition. This was a period of professional distress for Rooney; as a childhood friend, director Richard Quine put it: "Let's face it. It wasn't all that easy to find roles for a 5-foot-3 man who'd passed the age of Andy Hardy." In 1962, although he had earned $12 million by that point, his debts and multiple divorces had forced him into filing for bankruptcy.

In 1966, Rooney was working on the film Ambush Bay in the Philippines when his wife Barbara Ann Thomason—a former model and aspiring actress who had won 17 straight beauty contests in Southern California—was found dead in her bed in Los Angeles. Her lover, Milos Milos—who was one of Rooney's actor-friends—was found dead beside her. Detectives ruled it a murder-suicide, which was committed with Rooney's own gun.

Francis Ford Coppola had bought the rights to make The Black Stallion (1979), and when casting it, he called Rooney and asked him if he thought he could play a jockey. Rooney replied saying, "Gee, I don't know. I never played a jockey before." He was kidding, he said, since he had played a jockey in at least three past films, including Down the Stretch, Thoroughbreds Don't Cry, and National Velvet. The film garnered excellent reviews and earned $40 million in its first run, which gave Coppola's struggling studio, American Zoetrope, a significant boost. It also gave Rooney newfound recognition, along with an Academy Award nomination for Best Supporting Actor.

In 1983, the Academy of Motion Picture Arts and Sciences gave Rooney their Academy Honorary Award for his lifetime of achievement.

=== Character roles and Broadway comeback ===
==== Television roles ====
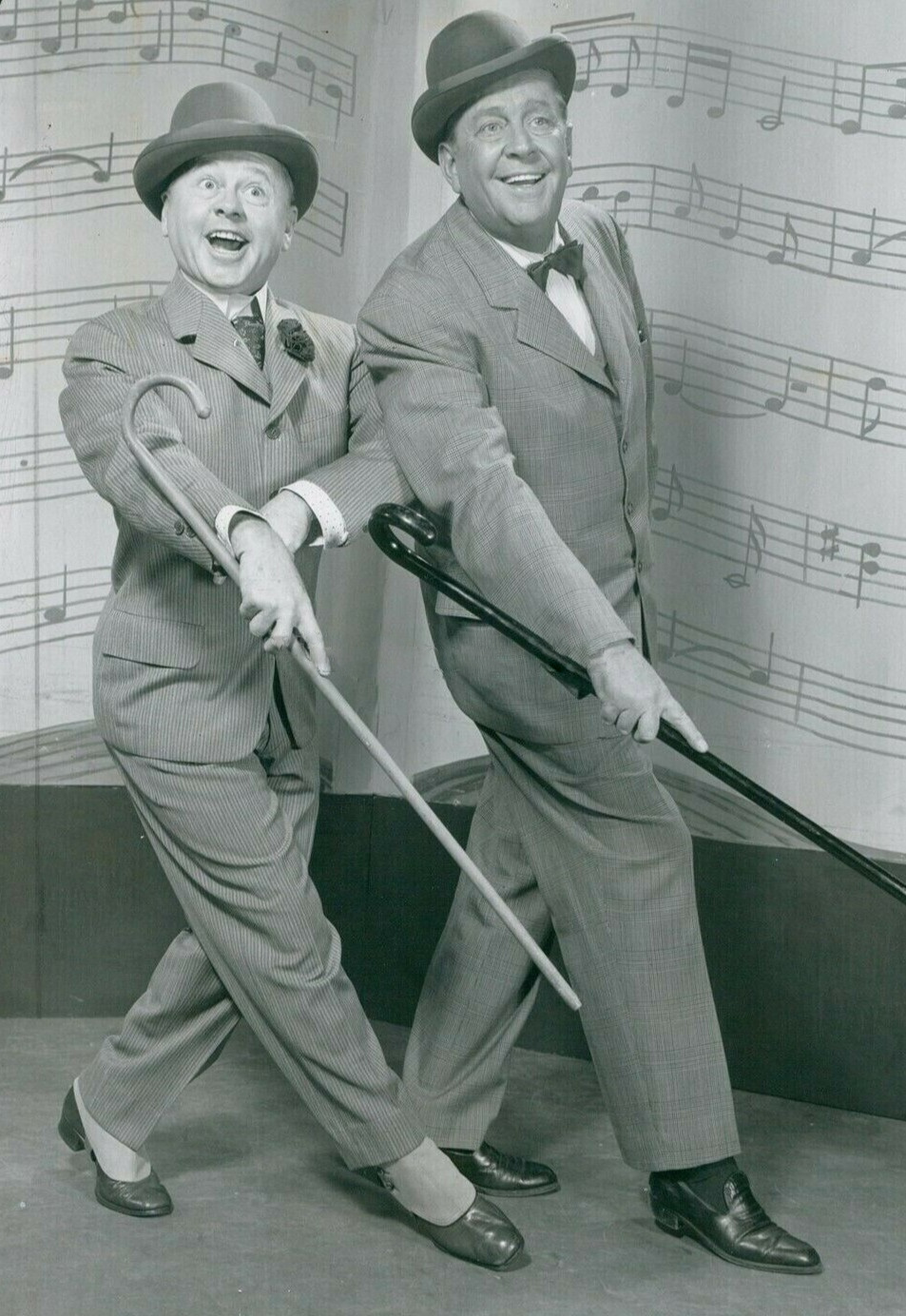
Rooney and James Dunn in the television special Mr. Broadway (1957)

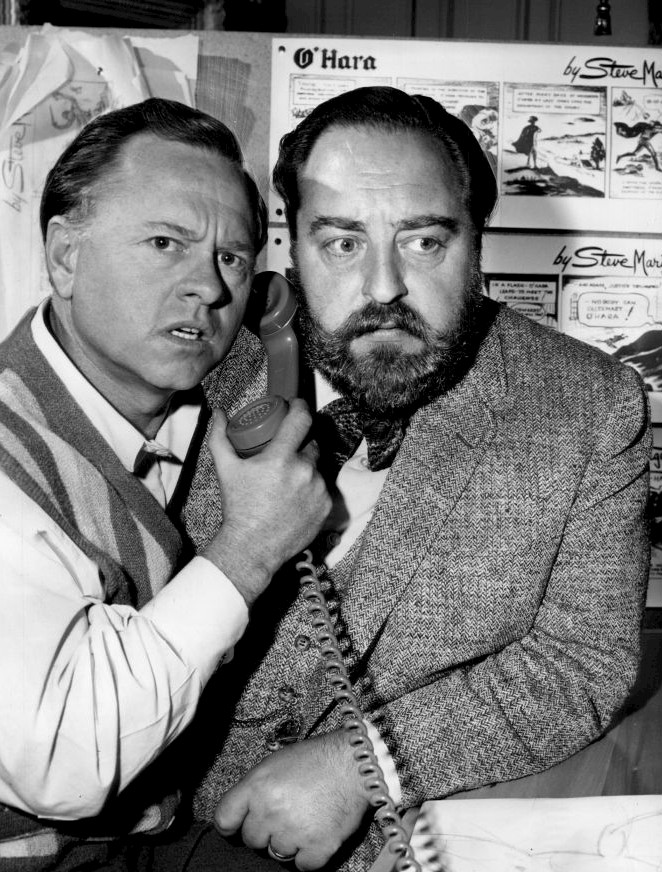
Rooney with Sebastian Cabot on Checkmate in 1961

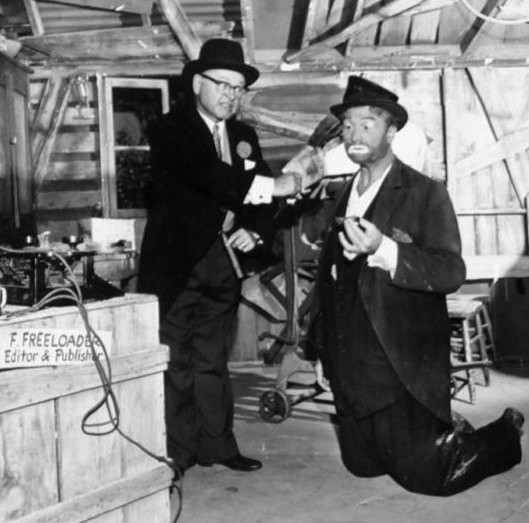
Rooney and Red Skelton on The Red Skelton Show in 1962

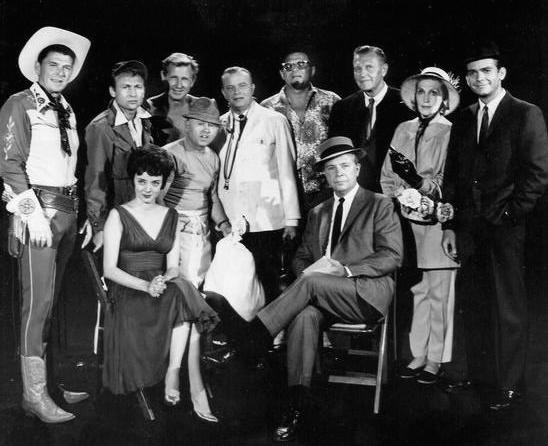
Guest stars for the 1961 premiere episode of The Dick Powell Show, "Who Killed Julie Greer?". Standing, from left: Ronald Reagan, Nick Adams, Lloyd Bridges, Mickey Rooney, Edgar Bergen, Jack Carson, Ralph Bellamy, Kay Thompson, Dean Jones. Seated, from left, Carolyn Jones and Dick Powell.

In addition to his movie roles, Rooney made numerous guest-starring roles as a television character actor for nearly six decades, beginning with an episode of Celanese Theatre. The part led to other roles on such television series as Schlitz Playhouse, Playhouse 90, Producers' Showcase, Alcoa Theatre, The Soldiers, Wagon Train, General Electric Theater, Hennesey, The Dick Powell Theatre, Arrest and Trial (1964), Burke's Law (1963), Combat! (1964), The Fugitive, Bob Hope Presents the Chrysler Theatre, The Jean Arthur Show (1966), The Name of the Game (1970), Dan August (1970), Night Gallery (1970), The Love Boat, Kung Fu: The Legend Continues (1995), Murder, She Wrote (1992), and The Golden Girls (1988) among many others.

In 1961, he guest-starred in the 13-week James Franciscus adventure–drama CBS television series The Investigators. In 1962, he was cast as himself in the episode "The Top Banana" of the CBS sitcom, Pete and Gladys, starring Harry Morgan and Cara Williams.

In 1963, he entered CBS's The Twilight Zone, giving a one-man performance in the episode "The Last Night of a Jockey" (1963). Also in 1963, in 'The Hunt' for Suspense Theater, he played the sadistic sheriff hunting the young surfer played by James Caan. In 1964, he launched another half-hour sitcom, Mickey. The story line had "Mickey" operating a resort hotel in Southern California. His own son Tim Rooney appeared as his character's teenaged son on this program, and Emmaline Henry starred as Rooney's wife. The program lasted for 17 episodes.

When Norman Lear was developing All in the Family in 1970, he wanted Rooney for the lead role of Archie Bunker. Rooney turned Lear down, and the role eventually went to Carroll O'Connor.

Rooney garnered a Golden Globe and an Emmy Award for Outstanding Lead Actor in a Limited Series or a Special for his role in 1981's Bill. Playing opposite Dennis Quaid, Rooney's character was a mentally handicapped man attempting to live on his own after leaving an institution. His acting quality in the film has been favorably compared to other actors who took on similar roles, including Sean Penn, Dustin Hoffman, and Tom Hanks. He reprised his role in 1983's Bill: On His Own, earning an Emmy nomination for the turn. He appeared on The Love Boat S6 E11 "A Christmas Presence" as Angelorum Dominicus (a guardian angel character). His wife Jan Rooney played Sister Bernadette, a nun with a beautiful singing voice. The episode aired on December 18, 1982.

In 1982, he starred in the NBC sitcom One of the Boys, along with two unfamiliar young stars, Dana Carvey and Nathan Lane; it ran for 13 episodes.

Rooney did voice acting from time to time. He provided the voice of Santa Claus in four stop-motion animated Christmas TV specials: Santa Claus Is Comin' to Town (1970), The Year Without a Santa Claus (1974), Rudolph and Frosty's Christmas in July (1979) and A Miser Brothers' Christmas (2008). In 1995, he appeared as himself on The Simpsons episode "Radioactive Man".

After starring in one unsuccessful TV series and turning down an offer for a huge TV series, Rooney, now 70, starred in the Family Channel's The Adventures of the Black Stallion, where he reprised his role as Henry Dailey in the film of the same name, 11 years earlier. The series ran for three years and was an international hit.

Rooney appeared in television commercials for Garden State Life Insurance Company in 2002.

==== Broadway shows ====
A major turning point came in 1979, when Rooney made his Broadway debut in the acclaimed stage play Sugar Babies, a musical revue tribute to the burlesque era co-starring former MGM dancing star Ann Miller. Aljean Harmetz noted, "Mr. Rooney fought over every skit and argued over every song and almost always got things done his way. The show opened on Broadway on October 8, 1979, to rave reviews, and this time he did not throw success away. Rooney and Miller performed the show 1,208 times in New York and then toured with it for five years, including eight months in London. Co-star Miller recalls that Rooney "never missed a performance or a chance to ad-lib or read the lines the same way twice, if he even stuck to the script". Biographer Alvin Marill states, "at 59, Mickey Rooney was reincarnated as a baggy-pants comedian—back as a top banana in show biz in his belated Broadway debut." For his performance, Rooney received nominations for Tony Award and Drama Desk Award for Best Actor in a Leading Role in a Musical.

Following this, he toured as Pseudelous in Stephen Sondheim's A Funny Thing Happened on the Way to the Forum. In the 1990s, he returned to Broadway for the final months of The Will Rogers Follies, playing the ghost of Will's father.

He toured Canada in a dinner theater production of The Mind with the Naughty Man in the mid-1990s. He played The Wizard in a stage production of The Wizard of Oz with Eartha Kitt at Madison Square Garden. Kitt was later replaced by Jo Anne Worley.

=== Final years ===
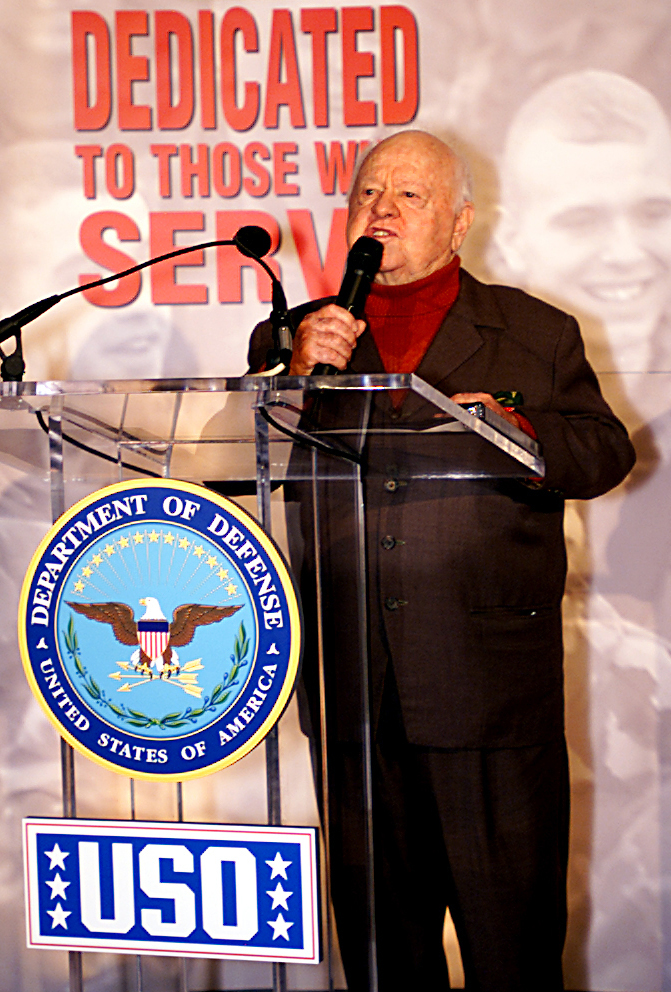
Mickey Rooney speaks at the Pentagon in 2000 during a ceremony honoring the USO

Rooney wrote a memoir titled Life Is too Short, published by Villard Books in 1991. A Library Journal review said, "From title to the last line, 'I'll have a short bier', Rooney's self-deprecating humor powers this book." He wrote a novel about a child star, published in 1994, The Search for Sonny Skies. On November 10, 2000, he starred in the Disney Channel original movie Phantom of the Megaplex.

Despite the millions of dollars that he earned over the years, such as his $65,000-a-week earnings from Sugar Babies, Rooney was plagued by financial problems late in life. His longtime gambling habit caused him to "gamble away his fortune again and again". He declared bankruptcy for the second time in 1996 and described himself as "broke" in 2005. He kept performing on stage and in the movies, but his personal property was valued at only $18,000 when he died in 2014.

Rooney and his wife Jan toured the country in 2005 through 2011 in a musical revue called Let's Put on a Show. Vanity Fair called it "a homespun affair full of dog-eared jokes" that featured Rooney singing George Gershwin songs.

In 2006, Rooney played Gus in Night at the Museum. He returned to play the role again in the sequel Night at the Museum: Battle of the Smithsonian in 2009, in a scene that was deleted from the final film.

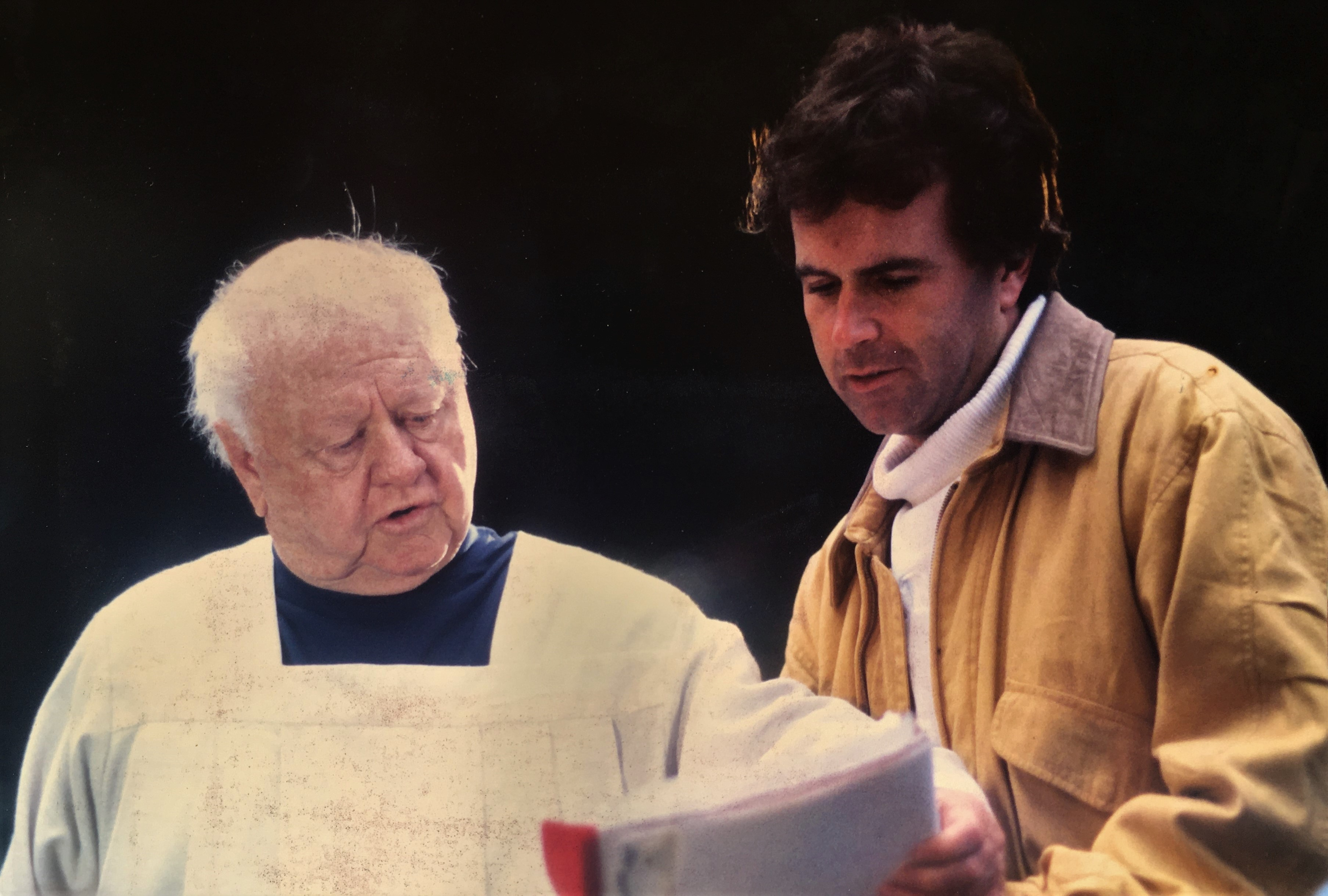
Rooney on the set of Illusion Infinity (2003) with director Roger Steinmann

On May 26, 2007, Rooney was grand marshal at the Garden Grove Strawberry Festival. He made his British pantomime debut, playing Baron Hardup in Cinderella, at the Sunderland Empire Theatre over the 2007 Christmas period, a role he reprised at Bristol Hippodrome in 2008 and at the Milton Keynes theater in 2009.

In 2011, Rooney made a cameo appearance in The Muppets, and in 2014, at age 93, six weeks before his death, he reprised his role as Gus in Night at the Museum: Secret of the Tomb, which was dedicated to Robin Williams, who also died that year, and to him. Although reliant on a wheelchair, he was described by director Shawn Levy as "energetic and so pleased to be there. He was just happy to be invited to the party."

An October 2015 article in The Hollywood Reporter maintained that Rooney was frequently abused and financially depleted by his closest relatives in the last years of his life. The article said that it was clear that "one of the biggest stars of all time, who remained aloft longer than anyone in Hollywood history, was in the end brought down by those closest to him. He died humiliated and betrayed, nearly broke, and often broken."

== Personal life ==
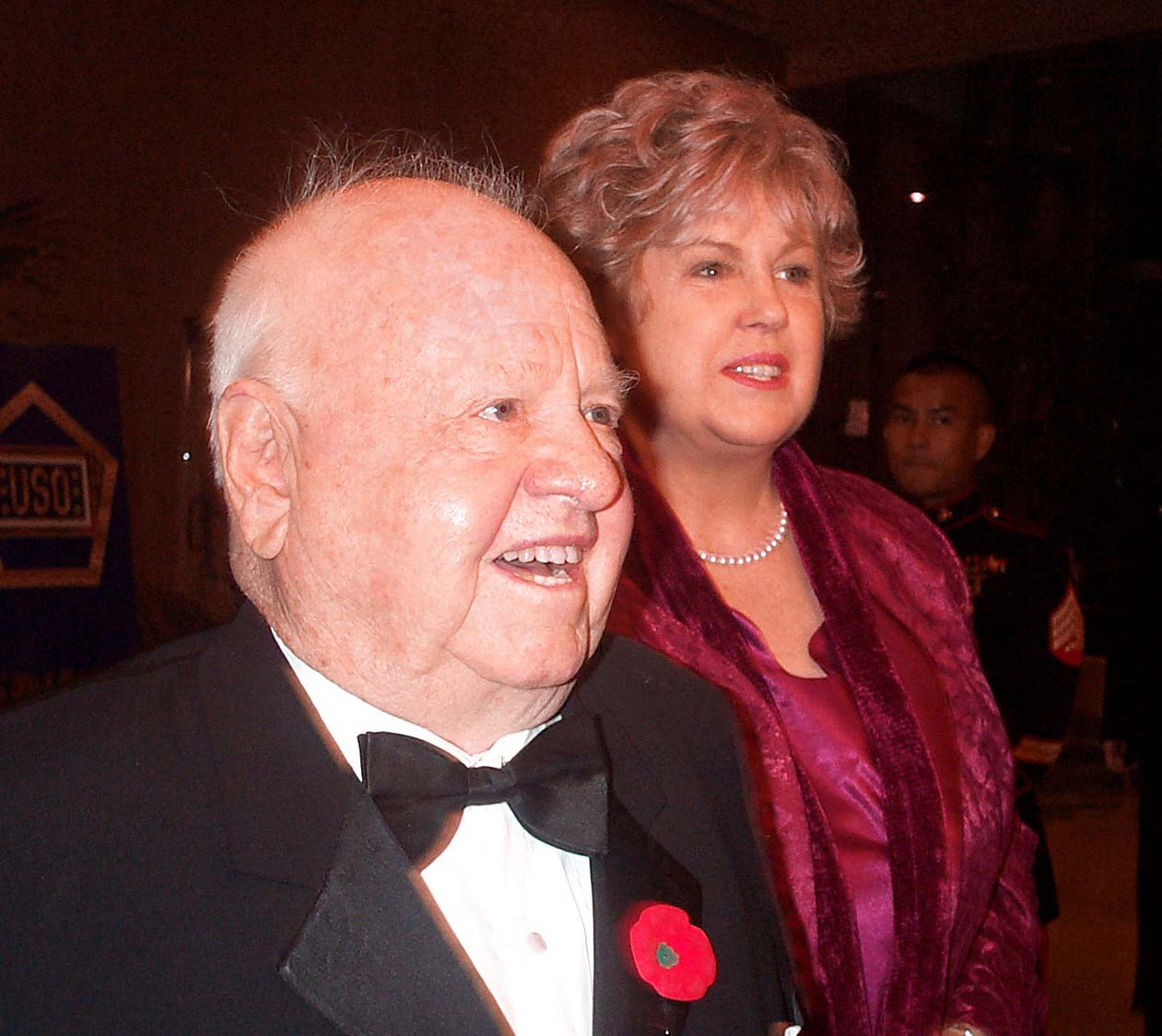
Rooney and his wife Jan at a Beverly Hills military concert in 2000

At the time of his death (April 6, 2014), Rooney was married to his eighth wife, Jan Chamberlin Rooney, although they had separated in June 2012. He had nine children and two stepchildren, as well as 19 grandchildren and several great-grandchildren.

Rooney had bipolar disorder and had attempted suicide two or three times over the years, with resulting hospitalizations reported as "nervous breakdowns". He also had been addicted to sleeping pills, and overcame the addiction in 2000 when he was in his late 70s. In February 1997, he was arrested on suspicion of beating his wife, Jan, but the charges were dropped due to lack of evidence.

In the late 1970s, Rooney became a born-again Christian and was a fan of Pat Robertson.

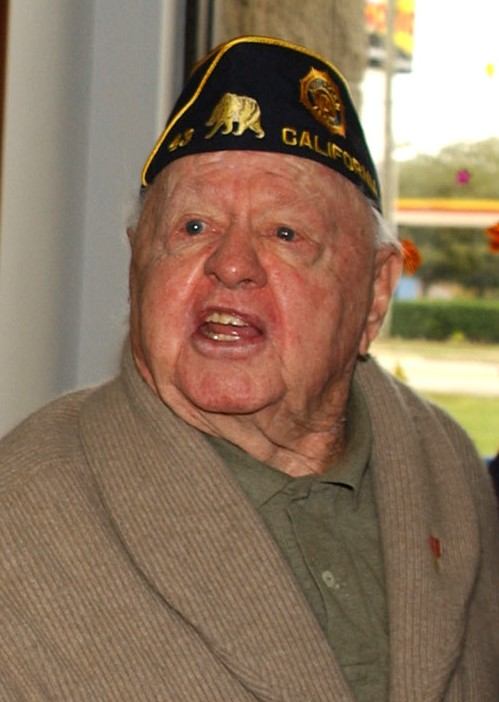
Rooney in 2006

On February 16, 2011, Rooney was granted a temporary restraining order against his stepson Christopher Aber and Aber's wife Christina, and they were ordered to stay 100 yards from Rooney, his stepson Mark Rooney, and Mark's wife Charlene. Rooney claimed that he was a victim of elder abuse. On March 2, 2011, Rooney appeared before a special U.S. Senate committee that was considering legislation to curb elder abuse, testifying about the abuse he claimed to have suffered at the hands of family members. In 2011, all of Rooney's finances were permanently handed over to a conservator, who called Rooney "completely competent".

In April 2011, the temporary restraining order that Rooney was previously granted was replaced by a confidential settlement between Rooney and Aber. Aber and Jan Rooney denied all the allegations.

In May 2013, Rooney sold his home of many years, reportedly for $1.3 million, and split the proceeds with his wife, Jan.

=== Marriages ===
Rooney was married eight times, with six of the unions ending in divorce. During the 1960s and 1970s he was often the subject of comedians' jokes over his apparent inability to stay married. In 1942, he married his first wife, actress Ava Gardner, who at that time was still an obscure 20-year-old starlet. They divorced the following year, partly because of his alleged infidelity. While stationed in the military in Alabama in 1944, Rooney met and married Betty Jane Phillips, who later became a singer under the name B. J. Baker. They had two sons together. This marriage ended in divorce after he returned from Europe at the end of World War II. His marriage to actress Martha Vickers in 1949 produced one son, but ended in divorce in 1951. He married actress Elaine Mahnken in 1952, and they divorced in 1958.

In 1958, Rooney married model and actress Barbara Ann Thomason (stage name Carolyn Mitchell); they had four children. She was murdered in 1966 by stuntman and actor Milos Milos (at the time bodyguard for French actor Alain Delon) who then shot himself. Thomason and Milos had an affair while Rooney was traveling, and police theorized that Milos had shot her after she wanted to end it. Rooney then married Barbara's best friend, Marge Lane, though the marriage lasted only 100 days. He was married to Carolyn Hockett from 1969 to 1975; they had two children. In 1978, he married his eighth and final wife, Jan Chamberlin. Their marriage lasted until his death, a total of 36 years (longer than his seven previous unions combined). However, they separated in 2012.

Wives	Years	Children
Ava Gardner	1942–1943	
Betty Jane Rase (née Phillips)	1944–1949	2, Mickey Rooney Jr. and Tim Rooney
Martha Vickers	1949–1951	1, Teddy
Elaine Devry (a.k.a. Elaine Davis)	1952–1958	
Barbara Ann Thomason (a.k.a. Tara Thomas, Carolyn Mitchell)	1958–1966	4, Kelly Ann, Kerry, Michael Joseph Rooney and Kimmy Sue
Marge Lane	1966–1967	
Carolyn Hockett	1969–1975	2, Jimmy and Jonelle
Jan Chamberlin	1978–2014 (separated, June 2012)	

== Death and funeral ==
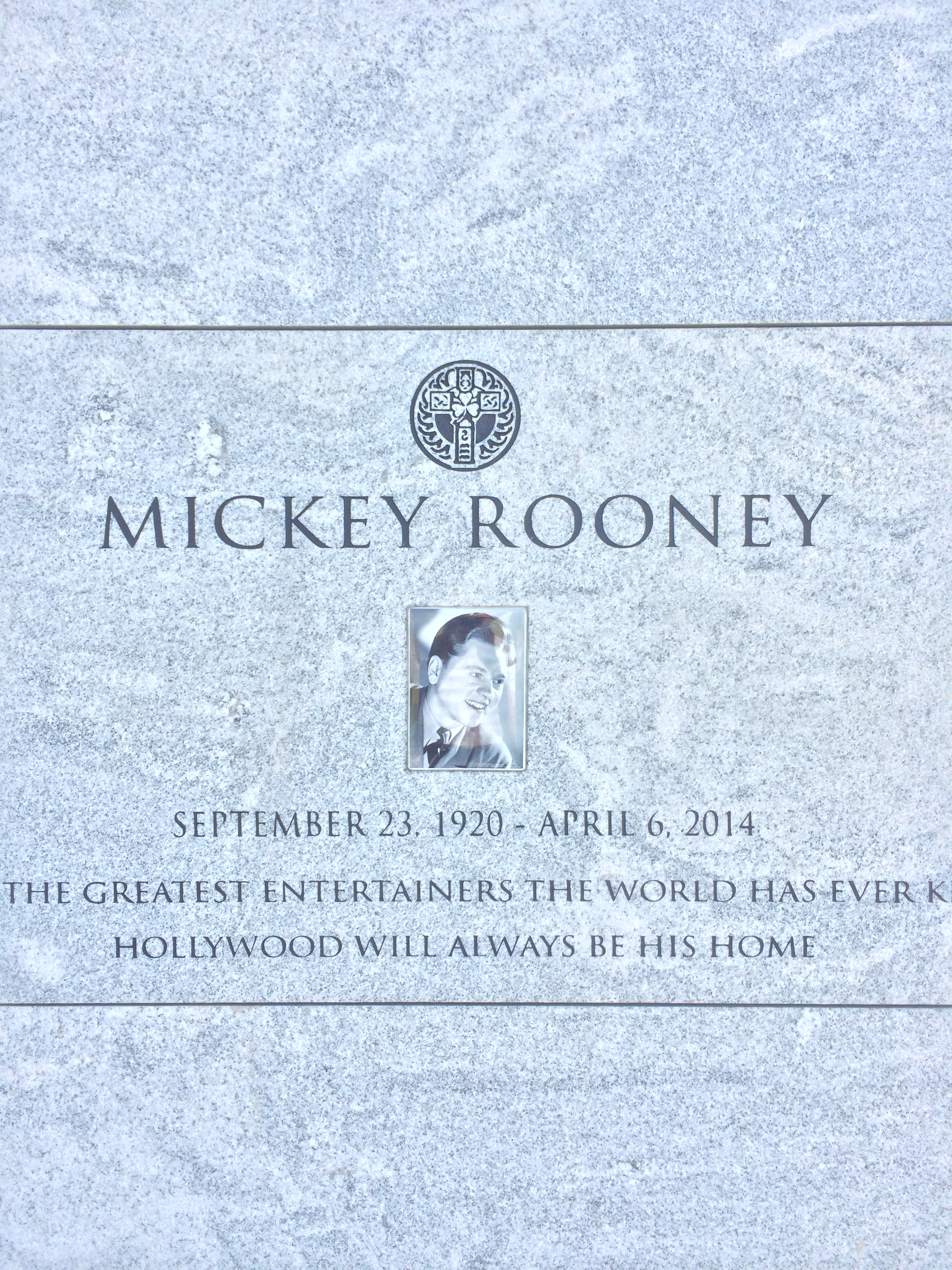
Grave and crypt of Rooney at Hollywood Forever Cemetery

Rooney died of natural causes (including complications from diabetes) in Studio City, Los Angeles, California, on April 6, 2014, at the age of 93. A group of family members and friends, including Mickey Rourke, held a memorial service on April 18. A private funeral, organized by another set of family members, was held at Hollywood Forever Cemetery, where he was interred, on April 19. His eight surviving children said that they were barred from seeing Rooney during his final years.

At his death, Vanity Fair called Rooney "the original Hollywood train wreck". Despite earning millions during his career, he had to file for bankruptcy in 1962 due to mismanagement of his finances. In his later years, Rooney had entrusted his finances to his stepson, who funneled Rooney's earnings to pay for his own lavish lifestyle. His millions in earnings had dwindled to an estate that was valued at only $18,000. He died owing medical bills and back taxes, and contributions were solicited from the public.

== Legacy ==
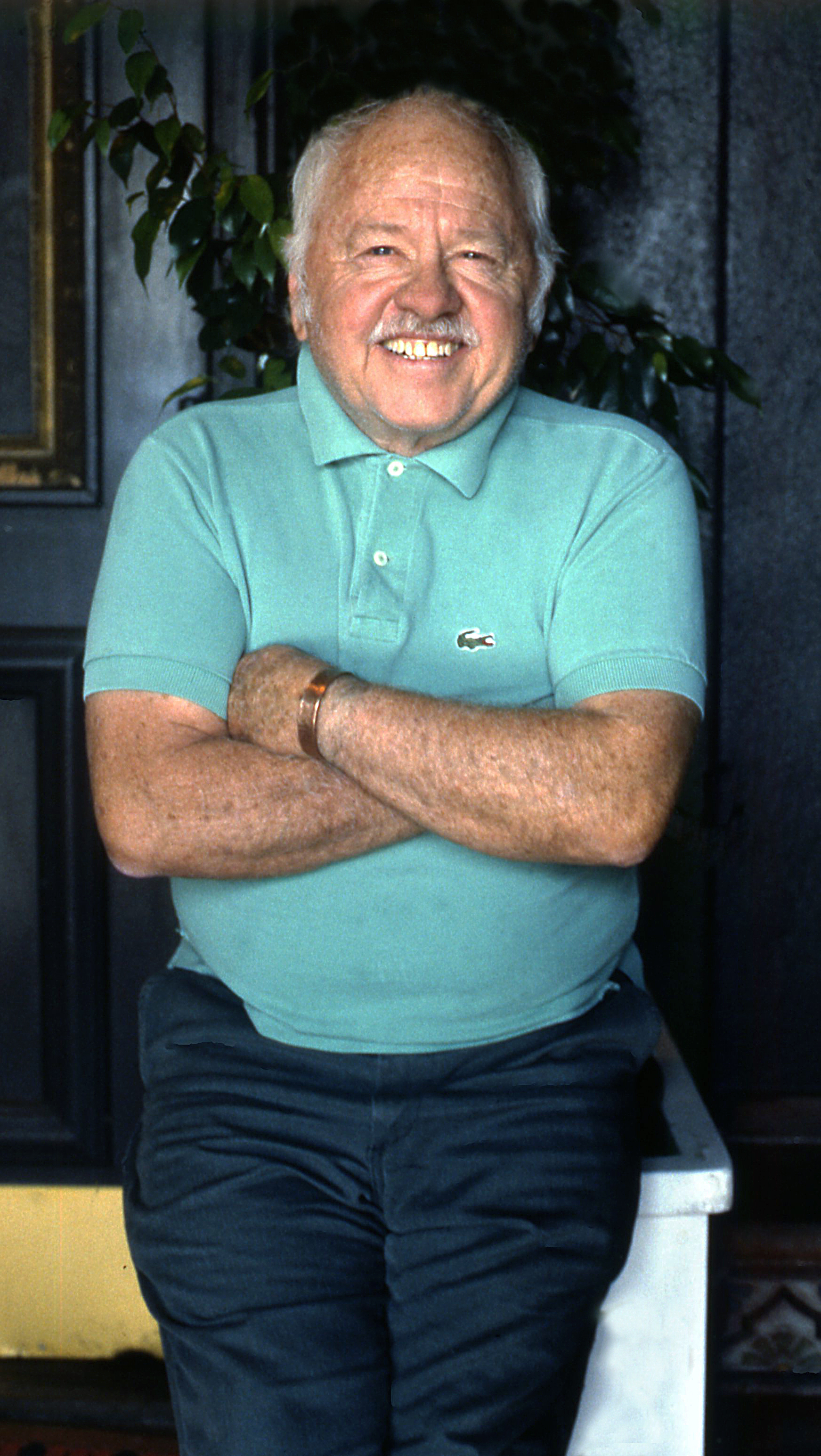
Rooney in 1986

Rooney was one of the last surviving actors of the silent-film era. His film career spanned 88 years, from 1926 to 2014, continuing until shortly before his death. During his peak years from the late 1930s to the early 1940s, Rooney was among the top box-office stars in the United States, and in 1939 was the biggest box-office draw, followed immediately by Tyrone Power.

He made 43 films between the ages of 15 and 25. Among those, his role as Andy Hardy became one of "Hollywood's best-loved characters," with Marlon Brando calling him "the best actor in films".

"There was nothing he couldn't do," said actress Margaret O'Brien. MGM boss Louis B. Mayer treated him like a son and saw in Rooney "the embodiment of the amiable American boy who stands for family, humbug, and sentiment," wrote critic and author David Thomson.

By the time Rooney was 20, his consistent portrayals of characters with youth and energy suggested that his future success was unlimited. Thomson also explains that Rooney's characters were able to cover a wide range of emotional types, and gives three examples where "Rooney is not just an actor of genius, but an artist able to maintain a stylized commentary on the demon impulse of the small, belligerent man:"

Rooney's Puck in A Midsummer Night's Dream (1935) is truly inhuman, one of cinema's most arresting pieces of magic. ... His toughie in Boys Town (1938) struts and bullies like something out of a nightmare and then comes clean in a grotesque but utterly frank outburst of sentimentality in which he aspires to the boy community ... His role as Baby Face Nelson (1957), the manic, destructive response of the runt against a pig society.

By the end of the 1940s, Rooney was no longer in demand, and his career declined. "In 1938," he said, "I starred in eight pictures. In 1948 and 1949 together, I starred in only three." Film historian Jeanine Basinger observed while his career "reached the heights and plunged to the depths, Rooney kept on working and growing, the mark of a professional." Some of the films that reinvigorated his profile were Requiem for a Heavyweight (1962), It's a Mad, Mad, Mad, Mad World (1963), and The Black Stallion (1979). In the early 1980s, he returned to Broadway in Sugar Babies, and "found himself once more back on top".

Basinger tries to encapsulate Rooney's career:

Rooney's abundant talent, like his film image, might seem like a metaphor for America: a seemingly endless supply of natural resources that could never dry up, but which, it turned out, could be ruined by excessive use and abuse, by arrogance or power, and which had to be carefully tended to be returned to full capacity. From child star to character actor, from movie shorts to television specials, and from films to Broadway, Rooney ultimately did prove he could do it all, do it well, and keep on doing it. His is a unique career, both for its versatility and its longevity.

== See also ==
- List of oldest and youngest Academy Award winners and nominees – Youngest nominees for Best Lead Actor
- List of actors with Academy Award nominations
- List of actors with more than one Academy Award nomination in the acting categories
- List of Golden Globe winners
- List of Primetime Emmy Award winners
- List of members of the American Legion
