= William Paton Mackay =

Scottish doctor and religious leader (1839–1885)

- Born: 13 May 1838; Montrose, Scotland
- Died: 22 August 1885 (aged 46); Portree, Scotland
- Education: University of Edinburgh
- Occupations: Doctor; Minister; Hymn writer
- Notable work: We praise thee O God for the Son of Thy love

William Paton Mackay (13 May 1839 – 22 August 1885) was a Scottish doctor, Presbyterian minister and hymn writer.

== Biography ==
Mackay was born in Montrose, Angus, Scotland, on 13 May 1839. He was educated at the University of Edinburgh, where he graduated as MA, MB and CM before going on to gain his MD in 1870 with a thesis on leprosy. He worked as a doctor for a number of years before deciding to become a minister. He testified that the reason behind his conversion was the discovery of his own Bible in the possession of a dying patient he was attending. This Bible had been given to him by his mother when he left home aged 17, but he had sold it to help make ends meet.

He became minister of Prospect Street Presbyterian Church, Hull, in 1868 just two years after the church was built. He married Mary Loughton Livingstone in the same year. During his time as a minister he also wrote a number of hymns, one of the best known of which is "We praise Thee, O God, for the Son of Thy love"

He died on 22 August 1885 in Portree, Scotland, as the result of an accident. He fell from the pier while boarding a ferry, striking his head and spending some time in the water before being rescued. He regained consciousness, but died later in a local hotel.

== Hymns (selection) ==
- We praise Thee, O God, for the Son of Thy love (Aka "Revive Us Again")
- Accepted in Christ, who has stood in our place
- Be strong in Jehovah, though hard be the fight
- Rejoice and be glad, the Redeemer has come
