= There Shall Be Showers of Blessing =

There shall be showers of blessing
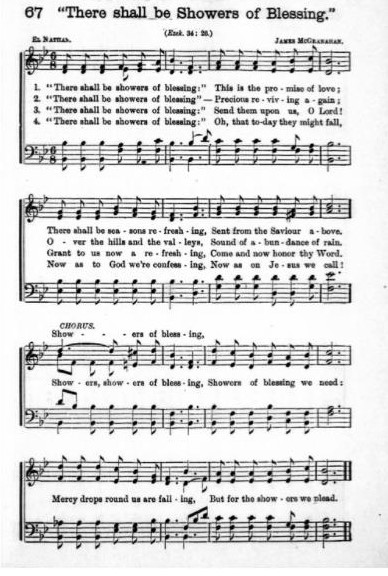
- Genre: Hymn
- Written: 1883
- Based on: Ezekiel 34:26-27
- Meter: 8.7.8.7 with refrain
- Melody: Modem sound

There shall be showers of blessings is a Christian hymn which was written in 1883 by Daniel Webster Whittle (1840–1901). It was given music by James McGranahan.

The hymn is based on the "showers of blessing" referred to in Ezekiel 34:26–27. Webster wrote under various pseudonyms, including Daniel W. Whittle, Daniel Webster White, Whittle Daniel, Nathan and El Nathan.
