= Johnny Gimble =

American country musician (1926–2015)

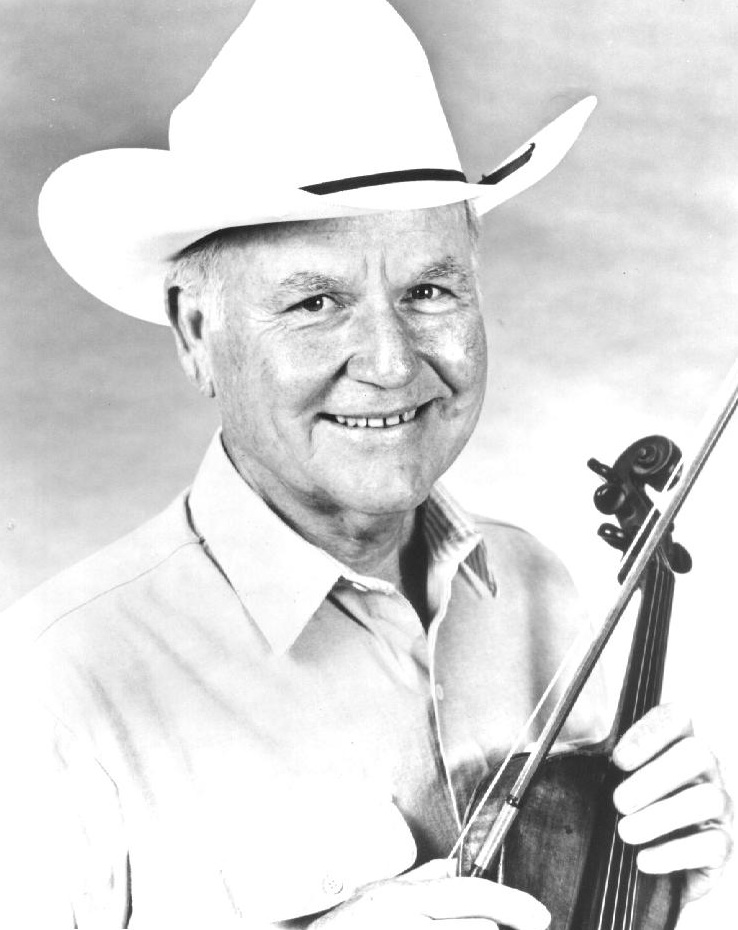

Background information
- Born: John Paul Gimble; May 30, 1926; Tyler, Texas, U.S.
- Died: May 9, 2015 (aged 88) Dripping Springs, Texas, U.S.
- Genres: Country; Western swing
- Occupation: Musician
- Instruments: Fiddle
- Years active: 1938–2015
- Label: CMH Records
- Website: johnnygimble.com

John Paul Gimble (May 30, 1926 – May 9, 2015) was an American country musician associated with Western swing. He was considered one of the most important fiddlers in the genre. He was inducted into the Rock and Roll Hall of Fame in 1999 in the early influences category as a member of Bob Wills and His Texas Playboys.

Gimble was posthumously inducted into the Country Music Hall of Fame in 2018.

== Biography ==
External audio
- Johnny Gimble: 'The King Of The Swing Fiddle', interviewed by Terry Gross on Fresh Air, 21:51, April 8, 2010.

Gimble was born in Tyler, Texas, and grew up in nearby Bascom. He began playing in a band with his brothers at age 12 and continued playing with two of them, George and Jerry, as the Rose City Swingsters. The trio played local radio shows and gigs at dance halls. Gimble later moved to Louisiana and began performing with the Jimmie Davis gubernatorial campaign. He was offered a job in the governor's administration but turned it down to volunteer for service in the U.S. Army. Gimble returned to Texas after completing his service in the U.S. Army in World War II.

Back in Texas, Gimble continued to hone his fiddling skills with a number of Texas radio and dance bands. In 1948, he made his first recording, playing with Robert Brother's Rhythmairs in Corpus Christi. A year later, he joined Bob Wills and his Texas Playboys, with whom he toured for most of the next decade. With Wills, he played both fiddle and electric mandolin and distinguished himself by using a five-string fiddle (most fiddles have four strings).

His fiddling style was influenced by other Texas fiddlers, who played the "breakdown" fiddle tunes. Gimble's fiddling style, while uniquely his own, came to be known as the "Texas fiddling style" that emerged during the first half of the 20th century among fiddlers such as Cliff Bruner, Louis Tierney, and Jesse Ashlock. Gimble learned from them and further developed while playing with Wills, who epitomized and promoted a new sound known as Western swing, which rose to national prominence in the 1940s, combining the old-time, Southern-derived Anglo string band tradition, with its breakdowns, schottisches, waltzes, and reels, with the big-band jazz and pop music of the day.

After Gimble married Barbara Kemp of Gatesville, Texas, in 1949, he settled in Dallas, where in the early 1950s, he began doing radio and television shows with Bill and Jim Boyd (of the Lone Star Cowboys) and performed on the Big D Jamboree, a weekly variety show broadcast live from the Dallas Sportatorium. He broke off to form his own group in 1951, performing as the house band at Wills's clubs in Fort Worth and Oklahoma City, but rejoined in 1953 and continued to play with Wills until the early 1960s. He played fiddle on Marty Robbins' number-one hit "I'll Go on Alone".

In 1955, Gimble moved to Waco, Texas, and split time between running a barber shop near the regional VA Hospital and music. In 1960, he quit touring with Bob Wills and hosted one of the first locally produced television shows on KWTX, Johnny Gimble and the Homefolks. Gimble's show featured a young bass player from nearby Abbott, Texas, named Willie Nelson, and a lifetime friendship and partnership was born. In 1968, after repeated encouragement from his peers, Gimble moved his family to Nashville, Tennessee. From then on, his steady work as a session musician included work with Merle Haggard and the Strangers on their Bob Wills tribute album (A Tribute to the Best Damn Fiddle Player in the World (or, My Salute to Bob Wills)), Conway Twitty, Connie Smith, Loretta Lynn, Lefty Frizzell, Ray Price, Willie Nelson, and Chet Atkins on Superpickers in 1973. The following year, he took a cue from a song ("Fiddlin' Around"), which he had written and performed on the Atkins' Superpickers album, and recorded his first solo album, titled Fiddlin' Around. He recorded nine other solo albums.

From 1979 to 1981, Gimble toured with Willie Nelson worldwide and appeared in a supporting role in the film Honeysuckle Rose. In 1983, Gimble assembled a Texas swing group, featuring Ray Price on vocals, and charted a country radio hit with "One Fiddle, Two Fiddle", featured in the Clint Eastwood film Honkytonk Man in which Johnny had a supporting role portraying Bob Wills. He appeared from the 1970s through the 2000s on Austin City Limits on TV. At the time of his death, he held the record for most appearances on the Austin-based PBS show. He was a member of the Million Dollar Band and frequent guest on "Hee Haw".

Gimble's career spanned into the 21st century, recording with Vince Gill and Tanya Tucker, and performing at the 49th Annual Grammy Awards with Carrie Underwood in 2007. "Until Lloyd Maines surpassed him, Johnny held the record for most appearances on Austin City Limits. He played with heart and soul and had an infectious spirit and sense of adventure - both in his music and personality," said ACL executive producer Terry Lickona. Johnny was also a regular on Minnesota Public Radio's A Prairie Home Companion hosted by Garrison Keillor, who in 1994 penned "Owed to Johnny Gimble" as a tribute to his friend after Gimble received the NEA's National Heritage Fellowship, and who performed the song again on May 9, 2015, to commemorate Gimble's life.

== Personal life ==
Gimble and his wife Barbara were divorced twice and remarried twice. They had a son and two daughters, and as of 2022, they had four grandchildren and six great-grandchildren.

Johnny and his son Dick Gimble, a college professor of music at McLennan Community College, started a Western Swing Camp focusing on fiddle. After two years in Waco and with the help of daughter Cyndy, they moved the camp to SMU's Taos Campus and ensured that the Western swing style of country music was passed on to the next generation.

Gimble's granddaughter, Emily, is a notable vocalist and keyboard player who has performed with Johnny, Asleep at the Wheel, Warren Hood, and Hayes Carll. Emily was a regular member of Asleep at the Wheel as keyboardist and vocalist from 2014 to 2016, a band that frequently partnered with Johnny to bring the music of Bob Wills to newer generations. Since then, she launched a solo career, based in Austin, Texas, and followed Johnny's footsteps as the State Musician of Texas for 2020.

Gimble's grandson, Jon Gimble, is the district clerk in McLennan County and serves on the Texas Judicial Council.

== Death ==
Gimble died not far from his home in Dripping Springs, Texas, on May 9, 2015, aged 88. His daughter stated that her father was "finally rid of the complications from several strokes over the past few years".

== Partial discography ==
- His final album, Celebrating with Friends - 2010, features duos with long-time collaborators Merle Haggard, Willie Nelson, Vince Gill, Dale Watson, and his son Dick and granddaughter Emily Gimble, and was produced by Ray Benson.
- A Case of the Gimbles - 2005. A collaboration with Johnny, son Dick Gimble, and granddaughter Emily Gimble.
- Under the X in Texas - 1992. Gimble's self-published classic featuring several self-compositions.
- Still Fiddlin' Around 1988. Gimble's LP featuring standards and self-compositions published by MCA Records
- Glorybound - 1987. Gimble's instrumental gospel album, originally published by Word Records in Waco, Texas
- Texas Fiddle Collection - 1981. Gimble's double LP published by CMH Records
- Johnny Gimble & the Texas Swing Pioneers - 1980. Double LP produced by CMH Records
- Johnny Gimble's Texas Honky Tonk Hits
- Johnny Gimble's Texas Dance Party - 1976. Gimble's live album recorded at the Chaparral August 29, 1975. Produced by Columbia Records
- Fiddlin' Around - 1974

== Awards and honors ==
From 1975 to 1990, he was nominated 15 times for Instrumentalist of the Year and won the Country Music Association Award five times. Johnny garnered nine Best Fiddle Player awards from the Academy of Country Music. Gimble was nominated for a Grammy for his performance on the 1993 Mark O'Connor album Heroes, and was awarded two Grammy Awards: 1) in 1994 for his arrangement of "Red Wing" on the Bob Wills tribute album by Asleep At The Wheel; 2) and in 1995 for Best Country Instrumental Performance for "Hightower" with Asleep At The Wheel.

In 1994, Gimble was awarded a National Heritage Fellowship as a Master Folk Artist from the National Endowment for the Arts.

In 1999, Gimble was inducted into the Rock n Roll Hall of Fame in the Early Influences category as part of Bob Wills and his Texas Playboys.

In 2005, Gimble was named State Musician for the state of Texas., and inducted into the Texas Country Music Hall of Fame.

Gimble was posthumously inducted into the Country Music Hall of Fame in 2018.

== Discography ==
=== Albums ===
List of albums, with selected chart positions and certifications, showing other relevant details
| Title | Album details | Peak chart positions | | | | | Certifications |
| Title | Album details | US | US Country | AUS | CAN | CAN Country | Certifications |
|---|---|---|---|---|---|---|---|
| Honeysuckle Rose (credited as "Willie Nelson and Family") | Released: July 18, 1980; Label: Columbia; Formats: LP, cassette | 11 | 1 | 34 | 24 | 4 | MC: Gold; RIAA: Platinum |
