= Michael J. Osborne =

Michael J. Osborne (born September 20, 1949, in Amarillo, Texas) is an American author, inventor, entrepreneur, and energy policymaker. He was one of three founding members of the Texas Renewable Energy Industries Alliance (TREIA). His public service appointments have included the steering committees of the State of Texas Energy Policy Partnership (STEPP) and the Sustainable Energy Development Council under Governor Ann Richards; and later, the Texas Energy Coordination Council appointed by Governor George W. Bush. As chair of the Austin Electric Utility Commission, Osborne has traveled internationally to speak and consult about the Texas energy experience. In 2015, he was part of the Austin, Texas, delegation to the 2015 United Nations Climate Change Conference held in Paris, France.

== Early life and education ==
The youngest of two sons born to Maxine Joan Chambers Osborne (a businesswoman and investor) and Jack Harold Osborne (a World War II navy pilot and rancher), Michael was born in Amarillo, Texas, on September 20, 1949. When he was six, his family moved to the small town of Pampa, Texas, where Osborne's interest in music grew as he played guitar and piano in two rock-and-roll bands. He graduated in 1967. Michael moved to Austin, Texas, at the age of seventeen, to attend the University of Texas and majored in aerospace engineering and later, business marketing. He withdrew from school one semester short of a degree after his business school dean denied him project credit for an advertising agency, Directions Company, he had started on the side.

== Professional life ==
Marketing music. As founder of Directions Company, Michael focused on marketing music venues such as Castle Creek, Mother Earth, and the legendary Armadillo World Headquarters (1971–1980), a famed venue that led the Music of Austin Texas to national prominence. The Armadillo became a springboard for the careers of celebrated musicians such as: Willie Nelson, Waylon Jennings, Stevie Ray Vaughan, Marcia Ball, Joe Ely, Jerry Jeff Walker, Bruce Springsteen, Shiva’s Headband, and many more.

Renewable Energy Business. Influenced by architect, inventor and philosopher, Buckminster Fuller, who believed in the importance of renewable energy, Osborne began to focus on the renewable energy business in the late 1970s by building passive solar homes and selling energy-saving wood stoves. In 1981 he developed the first wind energy project (consisting of five 25-kilowatt wind turbines) that sold energy to an electric utility in Texas. in 1983, he signed on as the first distributor in Texas for Solarex, a now-defunct maker of solar cells used then as power sources for such things as ranch gates, railroad signals and other places where stringing power lines was difficult or expensive. In the 1990s he ran the Texas operations for Zond Energy, which is now part of GE Wind Energy, the largest U.S. wind turbine maker. Throughout the 80s and 90s, Osborne documented and leased the wind resource for Texas wind fields. Many of his exploits are documented in the book, The Great Texas Wind Rush.

In 1999, Osborne was awarded Patent No. US5961739A for his invention of the hemispheric moving focus power plant.

Renewable Energy Policy. In 1984 Osborne co-founded the Texas Renewable Energy Industries Association (now Alliance) (TREIA) with two partners and worked with other key individuals and organizations to bring the nascent renewable energy industry to the attention of policymakers on the state and federal level. Governor Ann Richards appointed him to the steering committees of the State of Texas Energy Policy Partnership and the Sustainable Energy Development Council followed by an appointment by Richards’ successor, George W. Bush to the Texas Energy Coordination Council.

In 2002, Osborne was commissioned by the City of Austin to write a white paper funded by a U.S. Department of Energy (DOE) Grant, to develop a Sustainable Energy Plan for the city. The white paper was published as the book, Silver In The Mine. He was subsequently hired by the City to implement this sustainable energy plan as Director of Grants, Patents and R&D. Osborne served as Special Assistant to two Austin Energy General Managers and was charged with developing a vision for Austin which included a successful national campaign to get the automakers to support mass production of plug-in hybrid electric vehicles.

Upon leaving Austin Energy in 2014, Osborne served as Chairman of the City of Austin Electric Utility Commission from 2014 to 2016 and currently serves as a member of that body. He was also appointed Chairman of the City of Austin Generation Resource Planning Task Force, which resulted in an adopted generation plan to bring Austin (the nation's 7th largest public power utility and the 11th largest city in America) to 55% renewable energy by 2025. In April 2018, Michael founded the Texas Electric Transportation Resources Alliance with Tom "Smitty" Smith. In October 2019, Mayor Steve Adler appointed Michael to be the Special Envoy for the City of Austin to the C40 Conference on Climate Change in Copenhagen.

He lives in Austin with his longtime partner, Dana Sprute.

== Author ==
Osborne is a published writer. His book, Lightland, is a philosophical look at the human potential in light of the challenge of climate change. His book, Silver in the Mine, is a long-term comprehensive energy plan for the City of Austin, Texas. His third is an allegory called Day of the Heart. His most recent work is Beyond Light and Dark.

== Articles and interviews about Michael Osborne and renewable energy in Texas ==
- How Austin Came to Be A Solar Powerhouse, The Texas Sierra Club, Nov 5, 2015 - How Austin Came to Be A Solar Powerhouse
- Austin Energy Offers Solar Expansion as City Zeroes in on Carbon-Free Goal, KUT Public Radio, Austin, Texas, Sept. 25, 2014 - Austin Energy Offers Solar Expansion as City Zeroes in on Carbon-Free Goal
- Deep in the Heart of Texas: A Wind Energy Maverick Takes an Alberta Field Trip, Ecocide, Aug. 1, 2014
- Texas Solar Power May Have its Day in the Sun, The Texas Observer, March 27, 2014 - Texas Solar Power May Have its Day in the Sun
- A Mighty Wind, Texas Monthly, Aug. 2011 - A Mighty Wind
- The Austin Chronicle:
  - Point Austin: A Funny Thing Happened, Dec. 11, 2015 - It's going to be a while before City Council hires an Austin Energy consumer advocate
  - Pioneers or Settlers?, Jan. 16, 2015 - The latest on AE and solar
  - Affordability Key to Climate Plan Goals, July 17, 2014 - Can Austin reach net-zero carbon emissions by 2030?
  - Fighting for the Right to Clean Energy, Nov. 19, 2004 - Fighting for the Right to Clean Energy
