= Willie Nelson singles discography =

Willie Nelson discography
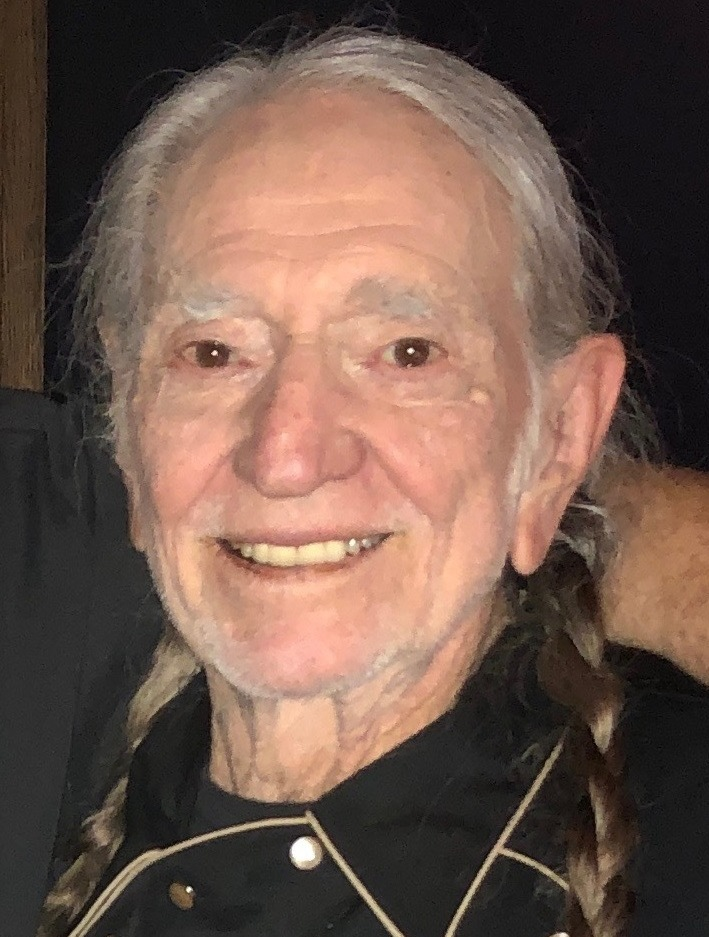
- Nelson in 2019
- Studio albums: 76
- Singles: 132
- Music videos: 80
- No. 1 singles (US): 25
- No. 1 singles (overall): 33

The following is a detailed discography of all singles released by American singer-songwriter Willie Nelson. A total of 25 Nelson singles have reached number one on music charts in the US.

His 1982 single, "Always on My Mind", reached the top 10 of the Billboard Hot 100. Two years later, his duet with Julio Iglesias, "To All the Girls I've Loved Before", became a worldwide hit. His albums and singles were successful in many countries, especially New Zealand, Australia and some European countries.

== Singles ==
=== 1950s and 1960s ===
Single	Year	Peak chart positions			Album
Single	Year	US Country	US Bubbling	CAN Country	Album
"No Place for Me"	1957	—	—	—	Non-album single
"Man With the Blues"	1959	—	—	—	Non-album single
"What a Way to Live"	1960	—	—	—	Non-album single
"Night Life"	1960	—	—	—	Non-album single
"The Part Where I Cry"	1961	—	—	—	...And Then I Wrote
"Willingly" (with Shirley Collie)	1962	10	—	—	Non-album single
"Touch Me"	1962	7	9	—	...And Then I Wrote
"Wake Me When It's Over"	1962	—	—	—	...And Then I Wrote
"You Dream About Me" (with Shirley Collie)	1962	—	—	—	Non-album single
"Half a Man"	1963	25	29	—	Here's Willie Nelson
"Take My Word"	1963	—	—	—	Here's Willie Nelson
"You Took My Happy Away"	1963	33	—	—	Non-album single
"Am I Blue?"	1964	—	—	—	Non-album single
"River Boy"	1964	—	—	—	Non-album single
"I Never Cared For You"	1964	—	—	—	Non-album single
"Pretty Paper"	1964	—	—	—	Non-album single
"She's Not for You"	1965	43	—	—	Non-album single
"Healing Hands of Time"	1965	—	—	—	Non-album single
"I Just Can't Let You Say Goodbye" (Live)	1965	48	—	—	Country Music Concert
"One in a Row"	1966	19	—	—	Make Way for Willie Nelson
"Columbus Stockade Blues"	1966	—	—	—	Non-album single
"I'm Still Not Over You"	1966	—	—	—	Non-album single
"The Party's Over"	1967	24	—	—	The Party's Over and Other Great Willie Nelson Songs
"Blackjack County Chain"	1967	21	—	—	Non-album single
"San Antonio"	1967	50	—	—	Texas in My Soul
"Little Things"	1968	22	—	8	Good Times
"Good Times"	1968	44	—	—	Good Times
"Johnny One Time"	1968	36	—	—	Non-album single
"Bring Me Sunshine"	1969	13	—	38	Non-album single
"I Hope So"	1969	36	—	—	Non-album single
"—" denotes releases that did not chart

=== 1970s ===
Single	Year	Peak chart positions						Album
Single	Year	US Country	US	CAN Country	CAN	CAN AC	AUS	Album
"Once More with Feeling"	1970	42	—	35	—	—	—	Both Sides Now
"Laying My Burdens Down"	1970	68	—	—	—	—	—	Laying My Burdens Down
"I'm a Memory"	1971	28	—	—	—	—	—	Willie Nelson and Family
"Yesterday's Wine" / "Me and Paul"	1971	62	—	—	—	—	—	Yesterday's Wine
"Words Don't Fit the Picture"	1972	73	—	—	—	—	—	The Words Don't Fit the Picture
"Shotgun Willie"	1973	60	—	66	—	—	—	Shotgun Willie
"Stay All Night (Stay a Little Longer)"	1973	22	—	26	—	—	—	Shotgun Willie
"I Still Can't Believe You're Gone"	1974	51	—	—	—	—	—	Phases and Stages
"Bloody Mary Morning"	1974	17	—	26	—	—	—	Phases and Stages
"Sister's Coming Home"	1974	93	—	—	—	—	—	Phases and Stages
"Blue Eyes Crying in the Rain"	1975	1	21	2	40	9	57	Red Headed Stranger
"Remember Me (When the Candle Lights Are Gleaming)"	1976	2	67	6	78	—	—	Red Headed Stranger
"I'd Have to Be Crazy"	1976	11	—	7	—	—	—	The Sound in Your Mind
"If You've Got the Money I've Got the Time"	1976	1	—	5	—	—	—	The Sound in Your Mind
"Uncloudy Day"	1977	4	—	4	—	—	—	The Troublemaker
"I Love You a Thousand Ways"	1977	9	—	20	—	—	—	To Lefty from Willie
"Georgia on My Mind"	1978	1	84	1	86	16	—	Stardust
"Blue Skies"	1978	1	—	1	—	4	53	Stardust
"All of Me"	1978	3	—	4	—	—	—	Stardust
"Whiskey River" (Live)	1979	12	—	3	—	—	—	Willie and Family Live
"September Song"	1979	15	—	5	—	—	—	Stardust
"White Christmas"	1979	—	—	—	—	—	—	Pretty Paper
"—" denotes releases that did not chart

=== 1980s ===
Single	Year	Peak positions									Certifications	Album
Single	Year	US Country	US	US AC	CAN Country	CAN	CAN AC	IRE	AUS	UK	Certifications	Album
"Help Me Make It Through the Night"	1980	4	—	—	1	—	—	—	—	—		Sings Kristofferson
"My Heroes Have Always Been Cowboys"	1980	1	44	—	1	—	3	—	—	—		The Electric Horseman
"Midnight Rider"	1980	6	—	—	1	—	10	—	—	—		The Electric Horseman
"On the Road Again"	1980	1	20	7	2	—	3	—	64	—	BPI: Silver; RMNZ: Gold	Honeysuckle Rose
"Angel Flying Too Close to the Ground"	1981	1	—	—	1	—	—	—	—	—		Honeysuckle Rose
"Mona Lisa"	1981	11	—	—	7	—	—	—	—	—		Somewhere Over the Rainbow
"I'm Gonna Sit Right Down and Write Myself a Letter"	1981	26	—	—	25	—	—	—	—	—		Somewhere Over the Rainbow
"Heartaches of a Fool"	1981	39	—	—	—	—	—	—	—	—		Greatest Hits (& Some That Will Be)
"Always on My Mind"	1982	1	5	2	1	10	4	8	39	49	RIAA: Platinum; BPI: Silver; RMNZ: Gold	Always on My Mind
"Let It Be Me"	1982	2	40	11	1	—	1	—	—	—		Always on My Mind
"Last Thing I Needed First Thing This Morning"	1982	2	—	—	1	—	—	—	—	—		Always on My Mind
"Little Old Fashioned Karma"	1983	10	—	—	20	—	—	—	—	—		Tougher Than Leather
"Why Do I Have to Choose"	1983	3	—	—	1	—	—	—	—	—		Take It to the Limit
"Take It to the Limit" (with Waylon Jennings)	1983	8	— (Note: "Take It to the Limit" did not enter the Billboard Hot 100, but peaked at number 2 on the Bubbling Under Hot 100 chart.)	31	1	—	—	—	—	—		Take It to the Limit
"Without a Song"	1983	11	—	—	3	—	—	—	—	—		Without a Song
"City of New Orleans"	1984	1	—	30	1	—	5	—	—	—		City of New Orleans
"Forgiving You Was Easy"	1985	1	—	—	1	—	—	—	—	—		Me & Paul
"Me and Paul" (re-recording)	1985	14	—	—	6	—	—	—	—	—		Me & Paul
"Living in the Promiseland"	1986	1	—	—	1	—	—	—	—	—		The Promiseland
"I'm Not Trying to Forget You"	1986	21	—	—	23	—	—	—	—	—		The Promiseland
"Partners After All"	1987	24	—	—	33	—	—	—	—	—		Partners
"Heart of Gold"	1987	44	—	—	52	—	—	—	—	—		Partners
"Island in the Sea"	1987	27	—	—	32	—	—	—	—	—		Island in the Sea
"Nobody There But Me"	1988	82	—	—	—	—	—	—	—	—		Island in the Sea
"Spanish Eyes" (with Julio Iglesias)	1988	8	—	—	3	—	—	—	93	—		What a Wonderful World
"Twilight Time"	1988	41	—	—	—	—	—	—	—	—		What a Wonderful World
"Nothing I Can Do About It Now"	1989	1	—	—	1	—	—	—	—	—		A Horse Called Music
"There You Are"	1989	8	—	—	4	—	—	—	—	—		A Horse Called Music
"—" denotes releases that did not chart

=== 1990s and 2000s ===
Single	Year	Peak chart positions			Album
Single	Year	US	US Country	CAN Country	Album
"The Highway"	1990	—	52	71	A Horse Called Music
"Is the Better Part Over?"	1990	—	— (Note: "Is the Better Part Over?" did not chart on Hot Country Songs, but peaked at No. 6 on Hot Country Radio Breakouts.)	—	A Horse Called Music
"Ain't Necessarily So"	1990	—	17	29	Born for Trouble
"The Piper Came Today"	1990	—	70	—	Born for Trouble
"Ten With a Two"	1991	—	45	35	Born for Trouble
"If I Can Find a Clean Shirt" (with Waylon Jennings)	1991	—	51	25	Clean Shirt
"Tryin' to Outrun the Wind" (with Waylon Jennings)	1991	—	—	—	Clean Shirt
"Graceland"	1993	—	70	41	Across the Borderline
"Still Is Still Moving to Me"	1993	—	—	—	Across the Borderline
"Turn Me Loose and Let Me Swing"	1995	—	—	86	Six Hours at Pedernales
"I Never Cared for You"	1998	—	—	—	Teatro
"Mendocino County Line" (with Lee Ann Womack)	2002	— (Note: "Mendocino County Line" did not enter the Billboard Hot 100, but peaked at number 13 on the Bubbling Under Hot 100 chart.)	22	—	The Great Divide
"Maria (Shut Up and Kiss Me)"	2002	—	41	—	The Great Divide
"Always on My Mind" (with Jon Bon Jovi and Richie Sambora)	2003	—	—	—	Willie Nelson & Friends – Stars & Guitars
"Wurlitzer Prize" (with Norah Jones)	2003	—	—	—	Live and Kickin'
"I'm a Worried Man" (with Toots Hibbert)	2005	—	—	—	Countryman
"The Harder They Come"	2005	—	—	—	Countryman
"You Don't Know Me"	2006	—	—	—	You Don't Know Me
"Cowboys Are Frequently, Secretly Fond of Each Other"	2006	52	—	—	Non-album single
"Gravedigger"	2008	—	—	—	Moment of Forever
"You Don't Think I'm Funny Anymore"	2008	—	—	—	Moment of Forever
"—" denotes releases that did not chart

=== 2010s ===
Title	Year	Peak chart positions		Album
Title	Year	US Country	US Bubbling	Album
"The Scientist"	2011	—	3	Heroes
"Roll Me Up and Smoke Me When I Die"	2012	—	—	Heroes
"Just Breathe"	2012	—	—	Heroes
"Come On Back Jesus"	2012	—	—	Heroes
"From Here to the Moon and Back" (with Dolly Parton)	2013	—	—	To All the Girls...
"Grandma's Hands" (with Mavis Staples)	2013	—	—	To All the Girls...
"It Won't Be Long" (with The Secret Sisters)	2013	—	—	To All the Girls...
"Somewhere Between" (with Loretta Lynn)	2013	—	—	To All the Girls...
"The Wall"	2014	—	—	Band of Brothers
"Wives and Girlfriends"	2014	—	—	Band of Brothers
"Band of Brothers"	2014	—	—	Band of Brothers
"Who'll Buy My Memories" (with Bobbie Nelson)	2014	—	—	December Day: Willie’s Stash, Vol. 1
"Laws of Nature" (with Bobbie Nelson)	2014	—	—	December Day: Willie’s Stash, Vol. 1
"Summer of Roses / December Day" (with Bobbie Nelson)	2014	—	—	December Day: Willie’s Stash, Vol. 1
"It's All Going to Pot" (with Merle Haggard)	2015	48	—	Django and Jimmie
"Unfair Weather Friend" (with Merle Haggard)	2015	—	—	Django and Jimmie
"Alice in Hulaland" (with Merle Haggard)	2015	—	—	Django and Jimmie
"Summertime"	2016	—	—	Summertime: Willie Nelson Sings Gershwin
"Someone to Watch Over Me"	2016	—	—	Summertime: Willie Nelson Sings Gershwin
"Heartaches by the Number"	2016	—	—	For the Good Times: A Tribute to Ray Price
"I'll Be There (If You Ever Want Me)"	2016	—	—	For the Good Times: A Tribute to Ray Price
"A Woman's Love"	2017	—	—	God's Problem Child
"It Gets Easier"	2017	—	—	God's Problem Child
"Old Timer"	2017	—	—	God's Problem Child
"He Won't Ever Be Gone"	2017	—	—	God's Problem Child
"Still Not Dead"	2017	—	—	God's Problem Child
"Mind Your Own Business"	2017	—	—	Willie and the Boys: Willie's Stash, Vol. 2
"I'm Movin' On"	2017	—	—	Willie and the Boys: Willie's Stash, Vol. 2
"My Tears Fall"	2017	—	—	Willie and the Boys: Willie's Stash, Vol. 2
"Last Man Standing"	2018	—	—	Last Man Standing
"Me and You"	2018	—	—	Last Man Standing
"Something You Get Through"	2018	—	—	Last Man Standing
"Ready to Roar"	2018	—	—	Last Man Standing
"Summer Wind"	2018	—	—	My Way
"One for My Baby (And One More for the Road)"	2018	—	—	My Way
"I'll Be Around"	2018	—	—	My Way
"Vote 'Em Out"	2018	—	—	Non-album single
"Ride Me Back Home"	2019	—	—	Ride Me Back Home
"My Favorite Picture of You"	2019	—	—	Ride Me Back Home
"Come on Time"	2019	—	—	Ride Me Back Home
"It's Hard to Be Humble" (with Lukas Nelson and Micah Nelson)	2019	—	—	Ride Me Back Home
"Immigrant Eyes"	2019	—	—	Ride Me Back Home
"Seven Year Itch"	2019	—	—	Ride Me Back Home
"Have You Ever Seen the Rain" (with Paula Nelson)	2019	36	—	To All the Girls...
"For Real" (with Lukas Nelson & Promise of the Real, Micah Nelson, Amos Lee, Dhani Harrison, and Jakob Dylan)	2019	—	—	Non-album single

=== 2020s ===
Title	Year	Album
"First Rose of Spring"	2020	First Rose of Spring
"Our Song"	2020	First Rose of Spring
"I'm the Only Hell My Mama Ever Raised"	2020	First Rose of Spring
"We Are the Cowboys"	2020	First Rose of Spring
"Under Pressure" (with Karen O)	2020	Non-album singles
"I'll Be Seeing You	2021	Non-album singles
"Dreams of the San Joaquin" (with Michael McDonald and David Hidalgo)	2021	
"I'll Love You Till the Day I Die"	2022	A Beautiful Time
"Energy Follows Thought"	2022	A Beautiful Time
"Tower of Song"	2022	A Beautiful Time
"Live Forever" (with Lucinda Williams)	2022	Live Forever: A Tribute To Billy Joe Shaver
"Last Leaf"	2024	Last Leaf on the Tree
"Do You Realize??"	2024	Last Leaf on the Tree

== Collaborations ==
=== Singles from collaboration albums ===
Year	Single	Artist	Peak chart positions										Certifications	Album
Year	Single	Artist	US Country	US	US AC	CAN Country	CAN	CAN AC	IRE	NZ	AUS	UK	Certifications	Album
1976	"Good Hearted Woman"	Waylon Jennings	1	25	16	5	—	6	—	—	—	—		Wanted! The Outlaws
1978	"Mammas Don't Let Your Babies Grow Up to Be Cowboys"	Waylon Jennings	1	42	33	1	57	42	—	—	—	—	RMNZ: Platinum	Waylon & Willie
1978	"I Can Get Off On You"	Waylon Jennings	1	—	—	—	—	—	—	—	—	—		Waylon & Willie
1978	"If You Can Touch Her at All"	—N/a	5	104	—	5	—	—	—	—	—	—		Waylon & Willie
1979	"Heartbreak Hotel"	Leon Russell	1	—	—	1	—	—	—	—	—	—		One for the Road
1979	"Crazy Arms"	—N/a	16	—	—	10	—	—	—	—	—	—		Honky Tonkin'
1980	"Night Life"	Danny Davis & The Nashville Brass	20	—	—	9	—	—	—	—	—	—		Willie Nelson and Danny Davis
1980	"Funny How Time Slips Away"	Danny Davis & The Nashville Brass	41	—	—	—	—	—	—	—	—	—		Willie Nelson and Danny Davis
1980	"Faded Love"	Ray Price	3	—	—	3	—	—	—	—	—	—		San Antonio Rose
1980	"Don't You Ever Get Tired (Of Hurting Me)"	Ray Price	11	—	—	18	—	—	—	—	—	—		San Antonio Rose
1982	"Old Friends" (with Ray Price)	Roger Miller	19	—	—	18	—	—	—	—	—	—		Old Friends
1982	"In the Jailhouse Now"	Webb Pierce	72	—	—	—	—	—	—	—	—	—		In the Jailhouse Now
1982	"(Sittin' On) The Dock of the Bay"	Waylon Jennings	13	—	—	2	—	—	—	—	—	—		WWII
1983	"Everything's Beautiful (In Its Own Way)"	Dolly Parton	7	(Note: "Everything's Beautiful (In Its Own Way)" did not enter the Billboard Hot 100, but peaked at number 2 on the Bubbling Under Hot 100 chart.)	19	5	—	2	—	—	—	—		The Winning Hand
1983	"Reasons to Quit"	Merle Haggard	6	—	—	7	—	—	—	—	—	—		Pancho & Lefty
1983	"You're Gonna Love Yourself (In the Morning)"	Brenda Lee	43	—	—	—	—	—	—	—	—	—		The Winning Hand
1983	"Pancho and Lefty"	Merle Haggard	1	—	21	1	—	—	—	—	—	—		Pancho & Lefty
1984	"To All the Girls I've Loved Before"^{[A]}	Julio Iglesias	1	5	3	1	1	1	16	2	4	17	RIAA: Platinum; MC: Platinum	Half Nelson
1984	"How Do You Feel About Foolin' Around"	Kris Kristofferson	46	—	—	35	—	—	—	—	—	—		Music from Songwriter
1984	"Seven Spanish Angels"	Ray Charles	1	—	—	1	—	—	—	6	29	—	RMNZ: Platinum	Half Nelson
1985	"Are There Any More Real Cowboys"	Neil Young	—	—	—	37	—	—	—	—	—	—		Half Nelson
"—" denotes releases that did not chart

=== Guest singles ===
Year	Single	Artist	Peak chart positions						Album
Year	Single	Artist	US Country	US	CAN Country	NLD	BEL	NOR	Album
1967	"Chet's Tune"	Some of Chet's Friends	38	—	—	—	—	—	—N/a
1974	"After the Fire Is Gone"	Tracy Nelson	17	—	—	—	—	—	Tracy Nelson
1977	"Lily Dale"	Darrell McCall	32	—	—	—	—	—	—N/a
1977	"You Are My Sunshine"	Duane Eddy (with Waylon Jennings, Kin Vassy and Deed Eddy)	69	—	—	—	—	—	—N/a
1977	"Luckenbach, Texas (Back to the Basics of Love)"	Waylon Jennings	1	25	1	—	—	—	Ol' Waylon
1978	"Something to Brag About"	Mary Kay Place	9	—	14	—	—	—	Aimin' to Please
1978	"Ain't Life Hell"	Hank Cochran	77	—	—	—	—	—	With a Little Help from My Friends
1980	"A Little Bitty Tear"	Hank Cochran	57	—	—	—	—	—	Make the World Go Away
1981	"There's a Crazy Man"	Jody Payne	65	—	—	—	—	—	—N/a
1982	"Just to Satisfy You"	Waylon Jennings	1	52	2	—	—	—	Black on Black
1982	"Long Black Limousine"	Rattlesnake Annie	—	—	—	—	—	—	Country Livin'
1983	"They All Went to Mexico"	Carlos Santana	—	—	—	7	8	—	Havana Moon
1984	"Wabash Cannonball"	Hank Wilson	91	—	—	—	—	—	—N/a
1985	"We Are the World"	USA for Africa	76	1	—	1	1	1	We Are the World
1986	"I've Already Cheated On You"	David Allan Coe	56	—	—	—	—	—	Son of the South
1986	"Wouldn't You Love Us Together Again"	Family Brown	—	—	46	—	—	—	Feel the Fire
1986	"Mind Your Own Business"	Hank Williams Jr. (with Reba McEntire, Tom Petty and Reverend Ike)	1	—	1	—	—	—	Montana Cafe
1987	"If I Could Only Fly"	Merle Haggard	58	—	50	—	—	—	Seashores of Old Mexico
1990	"Gulf Coast Highway"	Emmylou Harris	—	—	52	—	—	—	Duets
1999	"Two Sleepy People"	Crystal Gayle	—	—	—	—	—	—	Sings the Heart and Soul of Hoagy Carmichael
2003	"Beer for My Horses"	Toby Keith	1	22	—	—	—	—	Unleashed
2007	"On the Road Again"	Deana Carter	—	—	—	—	—	—	The Chain
2008	"My Medicine"	Snoop Dogg (with Everlast)	—	—	—	26	—	—	Ego Trippin
2008	"Lost Highway"	Kurt Nilsen	—	—	—	—	—	1	Rise to the Occasion
2014	"Hard to be an Outlaw"	Billy Joe Shaver	—	—	—	—	—	—	Long in the Tooth
2016	"Trashy Women (20th Anniversary)"	Confederate Railroad (with John Anderson and Colt Ford)	—	—	—	—	—	—	Lucky to Be Alive
2016	"Forever Country"	Artists of Then, Now & Forever	1	21	—	—	—	—	—N/a
2019	"Welcome to Hazeville"	Brantley Gilbert and Lukas Nelson	—	—	—	—	—	—	—N/a
2021	"Sad Songs and Waltzes"	Cody Johnson	—	—	—	—	—	—	Human: The Double Album
2022	"Beyond the Stars"	Tami Neilson	—	—	—	—	—	—	Kingmaker
2024	"That's What Makes the World Go Around"	Charley Crockett	—	—	—	—	—	—	–
2024	"Cowboys Are Frequently Secretly Fond of Each Other"	Orville Peck	—	—	—	—	—	—	–
"—" denotes releases that did not chart

== Other singles ==
=== Promotional singles ===
Year	Single	Peak positions			Album
Year	Single	US Country	US	CAN Country	Album
1975	"Fire and Rain"	29	—	44	What Can You Do to Me Now
1976	"Last Letter"	46	—	—	Country Willie
1976	"I Gotta Get Drunk"	55	101	—	Both Sides Now
1977	"I'm a Memory" (re-release)	22	—	21	Willie – Before His Time
1977	"You Ought to Hear Me Cry"	16	—	11	Willie – Before His Time
1978	"Will You Remember Mine"	67	—	—	Sweet Memories
1978	"There'll Be No Teardrops Tonight"	86	—	54	There'll Be No Teardrops Tonight
1979	"Sweet Memories"	4	—	1	Sweet Memories
1980	"Family Bible"	92	—	74	Family Bible
1981	"Good Times" (re-release)	25	—	9	Minstrel Man
1981	"Mountain Dew"	23	—	39	Minstrel Man
"—" denotes releases that did not chart

=== Other charted songs ===
Year	Single	Peak chart positions		Album
Year	Single	US Country	US Country Airplay	Album
2004	"Please Come Home for Christmas"	50	—	A Very Special Acoustic Christmas
2004	"Pretty Paper" (with Kenny Chesney)	45	—	All I Want for Christmas Is a Real Good Tan
2008	"That Lucky Old Sun" (with Kenny Chesney)	56	—	Lucky Old Sun
2010	"Baby, It's Cold Outside" (with Norah Jones)	55	—	American Classic
2013	"Coconut Tree" (with Kenny Chesney)	—	56	Life on a Rock
2019	"Have You Ever Seen the Rain" (featuring Paula Nelson)	36	—	To All the Girls...
"—" denotes releases that did not chart

== Music videos ==
Year	Video	Director
1982	"Always on My Mind"	
1983	"Pancho and Lefty" (with Merle Haggard)	Lana Nelson
1983	"Tougher Than Leather"	Lana Nelson
1984	"To All the Girls I've Loved Before" (with Julio Iglesias)	
1985	"Seven Spanish Angels" (with Ray Charles)	
1985	"Are There Any More Real Cowboys" (with Neil Young)	Lana Nelson
1986	"Blue Eyes Crying in the Rain"	
1986	"Living in the Promiseland"	
1989	"There You Are"	Richard Kooris
1991	"If I Can Find a Clean Shirt" (with Waylon Jennings)	Deaton-Flanigen Productions
1993	"Don't Give Up" (with Sinéad O'Connor)	Peter Israelson
1993	"Still Is Still Moving to Me"	John Williamson
1994	"Afraid"	Joseph Kahn
1994	"December Day"	Joseph Kahn
1994	"Once You're Past the Blues" (with Curtis Potter)	
1995	"Turn Me Loose and Let Me Swing" (with Curtis Potter)	
1996	"She Is Gone"	Liam Lunson
1998	"I Never Cared for You"	Wim Winders
1998	"My Own Peculiar Way"	Wim Winders
2001	"Rainbow Connection"	Greg Pritikin
2002	"Mendocino County Line" (with Lee Ann Womack)	Mark Seliger
2002	"Maria (Shut Up and Kiss Me)"	Mark Seliger
2003	"Always on My Mind" (with Jon Bon Jovi and Richie Sambora)	Jeb Brien
2003	"Beer for My Horses" (with Toby Keith)	Michael Salomon
2003	"Wurlitzer Prize" (with Norah Jones)	Jeb Brien
2004	"Shotgun Willie/Shotgun Bobby" (with Kid Rock)	
2005	"These Boots Are Made for Walkin'" (with Jessica Simpson)	Brett Ratner
2005	"I'm a Worried Man" (with Toots Hibbert)	Ras Kassa
2005	"The Harder They Come"	Ras Kassa
2006	"Big Booty"	Willie Nelson
2006	"You Don't Know Me"	Danny Clinch
2007	"I Give" (with Shawn King)	
2008	"Gravedigger"	Dean Karr
2008	"You Don't Think I'm Funny Anymore"	David Anderson/Lana Nelson
2008	"My Medicine" (with Snoop Dogg)	Pook Brown
2009	"Back to Earth" (with Melonie Cannon)	Scott Hansen
2009	"Hesitation Blues" (with Asleep at the Wheel)	Zalman King
2012	"Just Breathe"	Max Nichols
2012	"A Horse Called Music"	Andrew Shapter
2013	"I Wish I Didn't Love You So"	
2013	"Have You Ever Seen the Rain"	
2014	"The Wall"	
2014	"Band of Brothers"	
2014	"Who'll Buy My Memories"	
2014	"Laws of Nature"	
2014	"Summer of Roses" / "December Day"	
2015	"It's All Going to Pot"	
2015	"Alice in Hulaland" (with Merle Haggard)	
2016	"Lay Me Down" (with Loretta Lynn)	David McClister
2017	"A Woman’s Love"	
2017	"It Gets Easier"	
2017	"Old Timer"	
2017	"He Won’t Ever Be Gone"	
2017	"Still Not Dead"	
2017	"My Tears Fall" (with Lukas Nelson & Micah Nelson)	
2018	"Last Man Standing"	
2018	"Me and You"	
2018	"Something You Get Through"	
2018	"Ready to Roar"	
2018	"One for My Baby (and One More for the Road)"	
2018	"I'll Be Around"	
2018	"Bad Breath"	
2018	"Heaven is Closed"	
2018	"Summer Wind"	
2019	"Welcome to Hazeville" (with Brantley Gilbert and Lukas Nelson)	Chris Gregoire
2019	"Ride Me Back Home"	
2019	"Come On Time"	
2019	"It's Hard to be Humble"	
2019	"Immigrant Eyes"	
2019	"Seven Year Itch"	
2020
2020	"Our Song"	
2020	"I'm the Only Hell my Mama Ever Raised"	
2020	"We're the Cowboys"	
2020	"Vote 'Em Out"	
2021
2021	"That's Life"	
2021	"I Won't Dance"	
2021	"Cottage for Sale"	
2022
2022	"I'll Love You Till the Day I Die"	
2022	"Energy Follows Thought"	
2022	"Die When I'm High (Halfway to Heaven)" (with Particle Kid and Micah Nelson)	
