= The Essential Willie Nelson =

Greatest hits album by Willie Nelson
- Released: April 1, 2003
- Recorded: 1961–2003
- Genre: Country
- Length: 120:00
- Label: Sony BMG
- Producer: Nick Shaffran, Al Quaglieri

Willie Nelson chronology
Crazy: The Demo Sessions (2003)	The Essential Willie Nelson (2003)	Songs (2005)

The Essential Willie Nelson is a two-disc compilation of Willie Nelson songs. This digitally remastered compilation covers five decades of Nelson's recording career, and is part of Sony's Essential series of compilation albums. A 2009 release in limited Essential 3.0 series came with a bonus disc of eight fan-favourites and rarities. The album was re-released with an updated track listing on October 16, 2015.

== Reception ==
Professional ratings
Review scores
Source	Rating
AllMusic	5/5 stars
Q	4/5 stars

David Quantick of Q wrote, "[T]he songs here sound fresh and almost youthful. The arrangements are sparky, too... All the sheer scope of Nelson's writing is displayed." In a retrospective review, AllMusic editor Stephen Thomas Erlewine said that "The Essential Willie Nelson gets about as close as a set could to providing the basics".

== Track listing ==
Disc one
No.	Title	Writer(s)	Originally from	Length
1.	"Night Life"	Willie Nelson	Single A-side of Bellaire 107 (1960)	2:32
2.	"Hello Walls"	Willie Nelson	...And Then I Wrote (1962)	2:24
3.	"Crazy"	Willie Nelson	...And Then I Wrote (1962)	2:52
4.	"Funny How Time Slips Away"	Willie Nelson	...And Then I Wrote (1962)	3:03
5.	"I Never Cared For You"	Willie Nelson	Monument single A-side (1964)	2:32
6.	"The Party's Over"	Willie Nelson	The Party's Over and Other Great Willie Nelson Songs (1967)	2:29
7.	"Good Times"	Willie Nelson	Good Times (1968)	2:28
8.	"Me and Paul"	Willie Nelson	Yesterday's Wine (1971)	3:49
9.	"Shotgun Willie"	Willie Nelson	Shotgun Willie (1973)	2:39
10.	"Bloody Mary Morning"	Willie Nelson	Phases and Stages (1974)	2:49
11.	"Blue Eyes Crying in the Rain"	Fred Rose	Red Headed Stranger (1975)	2:21
12.	"Good Hearted Woman" (with Waylon Jennings)	Waylon Jennings, Willie Nelson	Wanted! The Outlaws (1976)	2:59
13.	"If You've Got the Money I've Got the Time"	Lefty Frizzell, Jim Beck	The Sound in Your Mind (1976)	2:06
14.	"Uncloudy Day"	Josiah Kelley Alwood	The Troublemaker (1976)	4:40
15.	"Mammas Don't Let Your Babies Grow Up to Be Cowboys" (with Waylon Jennings)	Ed Bruce, Patsy Bruce	Waylon & Willie (1978)	2:23
16.	"Georgia on My Mind"	Hoagy Carmichael, Stuart Gorrell	Stardust (1978)	4:21
17.	"Blue Skies"	Irving Berlin	Stardust (1978)	3:35
18.	"All of Me"	Seymour Simons, Gerald Marks	Stardust (1978)	3:54
19.	"Heartbreak Hotel" (with Leon Russell)	Mae Boren Axton, Tommy Durden, Elvis Presley	One for the Road (1979)	3:03
20.	"Help Me Make It Through the Night"	Kris Kristofferson	Sings Kristofferson (1979)	4:01
21.	"Whiskey River" (live, April 1978)	Johnny Bush	Willie and Family Live (1978)	3:31
22.	"Stay a Little Longer" (live, April 1978)	Bob Wills, Tommy Duncan	Willie and Family Live (1978)	3:25
Total length:				1:08:16

Disc two
No.	Title	Writer(s)	Originally from	Length
1.	"My Heroes Have Always Been Cowboys"	Sharon Vaughn	The Electric Horseman (1980)	3:06
2.	"Faded Love" (with Ray Price)	Bob Wills, Billy Jack Wills	San Antonio Rose (1980)	3:51
3.	"On the Road Again"	Willie Nelson	Honeysuckle Rose (1980)	2:33
4.	"Angel Flying Too Close to the Ground"	Willie Nelson	Honeysuckle Rose (1980)	4:31
5.	"Always on My Mind"	Johnny Christopher, Mark James, Wayne Carson	Always on My Mind (1982)	3:32
6.	"Last Thing I Needed First Thing This Morning"	Gary P. Nunn, Donna Farar	Always on My Mind (1982)	4:21
7.	"Pancho and Lefty" (with Merle Haggard)	Townes Van Zandt	Pancho & Lefty (1983)	4:48
8.	"To All the Girls I've Loved Before" (with Julio Iglesias)	Hal David, Albert Hammond	1100 Bel Air Place (1984)	3:34
9.	"City of New Orleans"	Steve Goodman	City of New Orleans (1984)	4:52
10.	"Seven Spanish Angels" (with Ray Charles)	Troy Seals, Eddie Setser	Friendship (1984)	3:52
11.	"Forgiving You Was Easy"	Willie Nelson	Me & Paul (1985)	2:49
12.	"Highwayman" (with Waylon Jennings, Johnny Cash & Kris Kristofferson)	Jimmy Webb	Highwayman (1985)	3:04
13.	"Living in the Promiseland"	David Lynn Jones	The Promiseland (1986)	3:22
14.	"Nothing I Can Do About It Now"	Beth Nielsen Chapman	A Horse Called Music (1989)	3:19
15.	"Graceland"	Paul Simon	Across the Borderline (1993)	4:46
16.	"Everywhere I Go" (with Emmylou Harris)	Willie Nelson	Teatro (1998)	3:52
17.	"Slow Dancing" (U2 featuring Willie Nelson)	Bono, The Edge	"If God Will Send His Angels" CD single B-side (1997)	4:02
18.	"Mendocino County Line" (with Lee Ann Womack)	Matt Serletic, Bernie Taupin	The Great Divide (2002)	4:33
19.	"One Time Too Many" (with Steven Tyler and Aerosmith)	Steven Tyler, Richie Supa	previously unreleased, recorded 1987	5:23
Total length:				1:14:22

Essential 3.0 bonus disc
No.	Title	Writer(s)	Originally from	Length
1.	"Remember Me"	Scotty Wiseman	Red Headed Stranger (1975)	2:52
2.	"I Love You a Thousand Ways"	Lefty Frizzell, Jim Beck	To Lefty from Willie (1977)	2:59
3.	"Love Me Tender"	George R. Poulton, Ken Darby	Porky's Revenge! (1985)	2:32
4.	"Midnight Rider"	Gregg Allman, Robert Kim Payne	The Electric Horseman (1979)	2:57
5.	"Philadelphia Lawyer"	Woody Guthrie	Folkways: A Vision Shared (1988)	2:59
6.	"Why Do I Have to Choose" (with Waylon Jennings)	Willie Nelson	Take It to the Limit (1983)	3:12
7.	"Let It Be Me"	Gilbert Bécaud, Manny Curtis, Pierre Delanoë	Always on My Mind (1982)	3:33
8.	"Still Is Still Moving to Me"	Willie Nelson	Across the Borderline (1993)	3:29

2015 re-release disc one
No.	Title	Writer(s)	Originally from	Length
1.	"Night Life"	Willie Nelson	Single A-side of Bellaire 107 (1960)	2:32
2.	"Hello Walls"	Willie Nelson	...And Then I Wrote (1962)	2:24
3.	"Crazy"	Willie Nelson	...And Then I Wrote (1962)	2:52
4.	"Funny How Time Slips Away"	Willie Nelson	...And Then I Wrote (1962)	3:03
5.	"The Party's Over"	Willie Nelson	The Party's Over and Other Great Willie Nelson Songs (1967)	2:29
6.	"I Gotta Get Drunk"	Willie Nelson	Both Sides Now (1970)	2:13
7.	"Yesterday's Wine"	Willie Nelson	Yesterday's Wine (1971)	3:12
8.	"Me and Paul"	Willie Nelson	Yesterday's Wine (1971)	3:49
9.	"Family Bible"	Willie Nelson	Yesterday's Wine (1971)	3:10
10.	"Bloody Mary Morning"	Willie Nelson	Phases and Stages (1974)	2:49
11.	"Blue Eyes Crying in the Rain"	Fred Rose	Red Headed Stranger (1975)	2:21
12.	"Good Hearted Woman" (with Waylon Jennings)	Waylon Jennings, Willie Nelson	Wanted! The Outlaws (1976)	2:59
13.	"If You've Got the Money I've Got the Time"	Lefty Frizzell, Jim Beck	The Sound in Your Mind (1976)	2:06
14.	"Uncloudy Day"	Josiah Kelley Alwood	The Troublemaker (1976)	4:40
15.	"Mammas Don't Let Your Babies Grow Up to Be Cowboys" (with Waylon Jennings)	Ed Bruce, Patsy Bruce	Waylon & Willie (1978)	2:23
16.	"Georgia on My Mind"	Hoagy Carmichael, Stuart Gorrell	Stardust (1978)	4:21
17.	"Blue Skies"	Irving Berlin	Stardust (1978)	3:35
18.	"Heartbreak Hotel" (with Leon Russell)	Mae Boren Axton, Tommy Durden, Elvis Presley	One for the Road (1979)	3:03
19.	"Lovin' Her Was Easier (Than Anything I'll Ever Do Again)"	Kris Kristofferson	Sings Kristofferson (1979)	5:51
20.	"My Heroes Have Always Been Cowboys"	Sharon Vaughn	The Electric Horseman (1980)	3:06
21.	"Faded Love" (with Ray Price)	Bob Wills, Billy Jack Wills	San Antonio Rose (1980)	3:51
22.	"Angel Flying Too Close to the Ground"	Willie Nelson	Honeysuckle Rose (1980)	4:31
23.	"Whiskey River" (live, April 1978)	Johnny Bush	Willie and Family Live (1978)	3:31

2015 re-release disc two
No.	Title	Writer(s)	Originally from	Length
1.	"On the Road Again" (Live)	Willie Nelson	Honeysuckle Rose (1980)	2:33
2.	"Always on My Mind"	Johnny Christopher, Mark James, Wayne Carson	Always on My Mind (1982)	3:32
3.	"Pancho and Lefty" (with Merle Haggard)	Townes Van Zandt	Pancho & Lefty (1983)	4:48
4.	"To All the Girls I've Loved Before" (with Julio Iglesias)	Hal David, Albert Hammond	1100 Bel Air Place (1984)	3:34
5.	"City of New Orleans"	Steve Goodman	City of New Orleans (1984)	4:52
6.	"Seven Spanish Angels" (with Ray Charles)	Troy Seals, Eddie Setser	Friendship (1984)	3:52
7.	"Forgiving You Was Easy"	Willie Nelson	Me & Paul (1985)	2:49
8.	"Highwayman" (with Waylon Jennings, Johnny Cash & Kris Kristofferson)	Jimmy Webb	Highwayman (1985)	3:04
9.	"Living in the Promiseland"	David Lynn Jones	The Promiseland (1986)	3:22
10.	"The End of Understanding" (with Waylon Jennings, Johnny Cash & Kris Kristofferson)	Willie Nelson	The Road Goes On Forever (1995)	2:41
11.	"Across the Borderline"	Ry Cooder, John Hiatt, Jim Dickinson	Across the Borderline (1993)	4:40
12.	"Still Is Still Moving to Me"	Willie Nelson	Across the Borderline (1993)	3:29
13.	"I Never Cared For You"	Willie Nelson	Teatro (1998)	2:18
14.	"Just Breathe" (with Lukas Nelson)	Eddie Vedder	Heroes (2012)	4:02
15.	"I Wish I Didn’t Love You So"	Frank Loesser	Let's Face the Music and Dance (2013)	4:18
16.	"From Here to the Moon and Back" (with Dolly Parton)	Dolly Parton	To All the Girls... (2013)	4:01
17.	"The Wall"	Willie Nelson, Buddy Cannon	Band of Brothers (2014)	3:29
18.	"Band of Brothers"	Willie Nelson, Buddy Cannon	Band of Brothers (2014)	2:51
19.	"Who'll Buy My Memories?" (with Bobbie Nelson)	Willie Nelson	December Day: Willie’s Stash, Vol. 1 (2014)	2:47
20.	"Unfair Weather Friend" (with Merle Haggard)	Marla Cannon-Goodman, Ward Davis	Django and Jimmie (2015)	4:14
21.	"It's All Going to Pot" (with Merle Haggard and Jamey Johnson)	Buddy Cannon, Jamey Johnson, Larry Shell	Django and Jimmie (2015)	2:56
22.	"Roll Me Up" (with Snoop Dogg, Kris Kristofferson and Jamey Johnson)	Willie Nelson, Buddy Cannon, Rich Alves, John Colgin, Mike McQuerry	Heroes (2012)	3:25

== Charts ==
=== Weekly charts ===
Chart (2003)	Peak position
Australian Albums (ARIA)	128
US Billboard 200	179
US Top Country Albums (Billboard)	24

=== Year-end charts ===
Chart (2003)	Position
US Top Country Albums (Billboard)	62

== Certifications ==
Region	Certification	Certified units/sales
United Kingdom (BPI)	Silver	60,000^{‡}
United States (RIAA)	Platinum	944,700
^{‡} Sales+streaming figures based on certification alone.
