= The Best of Willie Nelson (1973 album) =

The Best Of

Compilation album by Willie Nelson
- Released: 1973
- Genre: Country
- Length: 33:53
- Label: United Artists Records
- Producer: Joe Allison

Willie Nelson chronology
Country Winners (1973)	The Best Of (1973)	Spotlight on Willie Nelson (1974)

The Best of Willie Nelson is a compilation album released in 1973. It contains all 12 tracks from his first two albums, And Then I Wrote, plus "Half A Man" from Here's Willie Nelson.

== Release History ==
First released in 1973, this album was readily available throughout the 1970s. However, in 1980, a newly revived Liberty Records reissued this album, but omitted "Darkness On The Face Of The Earth", "Three Days", and "Undo The Right".

In 1988, this album was issued on CD for the first time by Liberty successor EMI-Manhattan Records, with all 13 tracks. However, the last two songs, "Darkness On The Face Of The Earth" and "Mr. Record Man" are presented out of order, with "Mr. Record Man" being track 12, and "Darkness On The Face Of The Earth" as track 13.

== Track listing (1973 LP) ==
All tracks are written by Willie Nelson, except where noted.

Side One
No.	Title	Writer(s)	Length
1.	"Funny How Time Slips Away"		3:02
2.	"Hello Walls"		2:23
3.	"The Part Where I Cry"		2:18
4.	"Undo the Right"	Hank Cochran, Nelson	2:56
5.	"Wake Me When It's Over"		2:48
6.	"Crazy"		2:50

Side Two
No.	Title	Length
1.	"Touch Me"	2:12
2.	"One Step Beyond"	2:20
3.	"Three Days"	2:33
4.	"Half A Man"	2:25
5.	"Where My House Lives"	2:24
6.	"Darkness on the Face of the Earth"	2:19
7.	"Mr. Record Man"	2:10

== Track listing (1980 Liberty reissue LP) ==
All tracks are written by Willie Nelson.

Side One
No.	Title	Length
1.	"Funny How Time Slips Away"	3:02
2.	"Hello Walls"	2:23
3.	"The Part Where I Cry"	2:18
4.	"Wake Me When It's Over"	2:48
5.	"Crazy"	2:50

Side Two
No.	Title	Length
1.	"Touch Me"	2:12
2.	"One Step Beyond"	2:20
3.	"Half A Man"	2:25
4.	"Where My House Lives"	2:24
5.	"Mr. Record Man"	2:10

== Track listing (Compact Disc) ==
All tracks are written by Willie Nelson, except where noted.

Tracks
No.	Title	Writer(s)	Length
1.	"Funny How Time Slips Away"		3:02
2.	"Hello Walls"		2:23
3.	"The Part Where I Cry"		2:18
4.	"Undo the Right"	Hank Cochran, Nelson	2:56
5.	"Wake Me When It's Over"		2:48
6.	"Crazy"		2:50
7.	"Touch Me"		2:12
8.	"One Step Beyond"		2:20
9.	"Three Days"		2:33
10.	"Half A Man"		2:25
11.	"Where My House Lives"		2:24
12.	"Mr. Record Man"		2:10
13.	"Darkness on the Face of the Earth"		2:19

== Personnel ==
- Artwork By [Cover Illustration] - Peter Palombi
- Design [Album] - Mike Salisbury
- Photography [Cover] - John Van Hamersveld
- Photography [Liner] - Jim Marshall
- Producer - Joe Allison
