= What Can You Do to Me Now =

Compilation album by Willie Nelson
- Released: 1975
- Recorded: 1965–1971
- Genre: Country
- Label: RCA

Willie Nelson chronology
Country Willie (1975)	What Can You Do to Me Now (1975)	The Longhorn Jamboree Presents: Willie Nelson & His Friends (1976)

Professional ratings
Review scores
Source	Rating
Allmusic	3/5 stars

What Can You Do to Me Now is a 1975 album by country singer Willie Nelson.

Issued after Nelson had left Atlantic Records, then signed with Columbia Records, this album was the third compilation of Willie Nelson songs from RCA in as many years. While 1973's Country Winners and 1974's Spotlight on Willie Nelson appeared on the budget Camden label, this appeared on RCA's full-price Victor.

All ten songs were sourced from Willie's earlier RCA albums, using the original stereo LP mixes. However, some of these songs would later be reissued with added overdubs. For example, "I Gotta Get Drunk" appears here in its original studio version; when it was issued as part of the "Willie Nelson Live" album the following year, RCA overdubbed the crowd and applause not present on the original recording.

To promote the album, RCA issued "Fire and Rain"/"I'm A Memory" as a single (RCA PB-10429).

== Track listing ==
All songs composed by Willie Nelson, except where noted.

1. "I'm a Memory" (originally issued on Willie Nelson and Family, released 1971)
2. "What Can You Do to Me Now" (Hank Cochran, Willie Nelson) (originally issued on Willie Nelson and Family, released 1971)
3. "Fire and Rain" (James Taylor) (originally issued on Willie Nelson and Family, released 1971)
4. "Once More With Feeling" (Willie Nelson, Shirley Nelson) (originally issued on Both Sides Now, released 1970)
5. "I've Seen That Look on Me (A Thousand Times)" (Harlan Howard, Shirl Milete) (originally issued on Laying My Burdens Down, issued 1970)
6. "Wake Me When It's Over" (originally issued on The Willie Way, released 1972)
7. "My Own Peculiar Way" (originally issued on Country Willie – His Own Songs, released 1965)
8. "Permanently Lonely" (originally released as a single in 1965, later issued on Good Times in 1968)
9. "I Gotta Get Drunk" (originally issued on Both Sides Now, released 1970)
10. "You Left Me a Long, Long Time Ago" (originally issued on The Willie Way, released 1972)

== Charts ==
=== Weekly charts ===
Chart (1975–1976)	Peak position
US Billboard 200	196
US Top Country Albums (Billboard)	5

=== Year-end charts ===
Chart (1976)	Position
US Top Country Albums (Billboard)	23
