= Country Willie =

Compilation album by Willie Nelson
- Released: 1975
- Genre: Country
- Label: United Artists

Willie Nelson chronology
| Spotlight on Willie Nelson (1974) | Country Willie (1975) | What Can You Do to Me Now (1975) |

Country Willie is a 1975 compilation album by country singer Willie Nelson. It was issued by United Artists Records, the successor label to Liberty Records.

== Background ==
In 1975, despite recording for Liberty, Monument, RCA and Atlantic, Willie Nelson had finally found major mainstream success as a recording artist. As RCA did after Willie signed with Atlantic, United Artists Records began reissuing Willie Nelson tracks it had in their vaults.

The first reissue from United Artists, The Best Of Willie Nelson, was a reconfigured version of his 1962 debut for Liberty, ...And Then I Wrote, with "Half A Man", from his second Liberty album, Here's Willie Nelson, added. For this album, United Artists gathered six previously unreleased songs, two songs from Here's Willie Nelson, and two songs issued only as singles. Among the unreleased songs was a duet with his then-wife, Shirley Collie: "Columbus Stockade Blues". Unfortunately, she is not credited on the LP.

Despite not charting, this album was reissued at least twice in the 1980s: by a newly reactivated Liberty Records around 1980 (LN-10013), and on CD (alongside The Best Of Willie Nelson) by EMI-Manhattan in 1988 (CDP7 48399 2).

== Track listing ==
1. Country Willie
2. There'll Be No Teardrops Tonight (originally issued as Liberty 55661 in 1963)
3. Right or Wrong (originally issued on Here's Willie Nelson in 1963, and issued as Liberty 56143 in 1969)
4. I'll Walk Alone
5. Take Me as I Am (Or Let Me Go)
6. Night Life (originally issued as United Artists single UA 641 in 1963)
7. Seasons of My Heart
8. Columbus Stockade Blues (with Shirley Collie, uncredited)
9. There Goes a Man
10. The Last Letter (originally issued on Here's Willie Nelson in 1963)

All selections previously unreleased except as indicated.

== Personnel ==
- Willie Nelson – guitar, vocals
