= Wake Me When It's Over (Willie Nelson song) =

1962 single by Willie Nelson

Single by Willie Nelson
- B-side: "There's Gonna Be Love in My House"
- Released: November 1962
- Recorded: September 11–12, 1961 at Radio Recorders
- Genre: Country
- Length: 2:46
- Label: Liberty
- Songwriter: Willie Nelson
- Producer: Joe Allison

Willie Nelson singles chronology
"Touch Me" (1962)	"Wake Me When It's Over" (1962)	"You Dream About Me" (1962)

"Wake Me When It's Over" is a song written and recorded by American country music singer Willie Nelson. After being signed as a recording artist to Liberty Records in 1961, the song was recorded during his second session with the label in September 1961 at Radio Recorders. Selected as the A-side of one of the promotional singles, the song failed to chart.

== Background ==
While he lived in Houston, Texas Nelson sold his original "Family Bible", that turned into a hit for Claude Gray. Despite that he was not credited as the songwriter on the record, he took advantage of the recognition that the song granted him, and moved to Nashville in 1960. While he joined Ray Price's band as a bass player, his songs became hits for other artists, including "Funny How Time Slips Away" (Billy Walker), "Pretty Paper" (Roy Orbison), and, most famously, "Crazy" by Patsy Cline. Leveraged by his prominence as a songwriter, he was signed as a recording artist by Liberty Records in 1961.

== Recording ==
"Wake Me When it's Over" was recorded during Nelson's second session with the label. Producer Joe Allison took him to Radio Recorders, on September 11–12, 1961. Nelson's backing included: Billy Strange, Roy Nichols and Johnny Western on guitars; pianist Jim Pierce; bassists Red Wootten and Ray Pohlman; and drummer Roy Harte. The session produced the tracks for the album ...And Then I Wrote, with the song being selected as the A-side of one of the promotional singles.

On its September review, Billboard gave the single four stars, noting its "strong sales potential". The publication declared: "the chanter handles a neat ballad [...] He's got a lot of style here." The single was released in October 1962. While the release failed to chart, its flipside "There's Gonna Be Love In My House" spent two weeks on Cashbox's Country singles, peaking at 47. Nelson re-recorded the song for his 1972 album The Willie Way, 1987 album Island In The Sea and 2000 album Milk Cow Blues.
