= Songs (Willie Nelson album) =

Compilation album by Willie Nelson
- Released: February 15, 2005
- Genre: Country
- Label: Lost Highway
- Producer: Willie Nelson, Chet Atkins, Joe Allison, Frank Callari, Mark Hubbard, Felton Jarvis, Arif Mardin, Daniel Lanois, Fred Fletcher, Ronnie Light, Chips Moman, Amy Nelson, Derek O'Brien, Jerry Wexler, Dave Zettner, Matt Serletic, James Stroud

Willie Nelson chronology
The Essential Willie Nelson (2003)	Songs (2005)	The Complete Atlantic Sessions (2006)

Professional ratings
Review scores
Source	Rating
AllMusic	3.5/5 stars

Songs is a 2005 compilation album by country singer Willie Nelson.

== Track listing ==
1. Crazy [Original Demo] - 3:58
2. Touch Me - 2:13
3. Good Times - 2:27
4. Yesterday's Wine - 3:13
5. Whiskey River - 4:04
6. Stay All Night (Stay a Little Longer) - 2:34
7. It's Not Supposed to Be That Way - 3:30
8. Blue Eyes Crying in the Rain - 2:21
9. Good Hearted Woman [Live] - 2:57
10. Always on My Mind - 3:32
11. Just to Satisfy You - 2:50
12. Pancho and Lefty [feat. Merle Haggard] - 4:48
13. She Is Gone - 2:58
14. My Own Peculiar Way - 3:38
15. Funny How Time Slips Away [feat. Francine Reed] - 4:11
16. Night Life [feat. B.B. King] - 4:28
17. Rainbow Connection - 4:30
18. Don't Fade Away [feat. Brian McKnight] - 4:20
19. Mendocino County Line [feat. Lee Ann Womack] - 4:31
20. On the Road Again [Live] - 2:31

== Charts ==
=== Weekly charts ===
Chart (2005)	Peak position
US Billboard 200	64
US Top Country Albums (Billboard)	13

=== Year-end charts ===
Chart (2005)	Position
US Top Country Albums (Billboard)	56
