= Mr. Record Man =

Single by Willie Nelson
- A-side: "The Part Where I Cry"
- Released: November 1961
- Recorded: September 11–12, 1961 at Radio Recorders
- Genre: Country
- Length: 2:14
- Label: Liberty
- Songwriter: Willie Nelson

"Mr. Record Man" is a song written by country music singer-songwriter Willie Nelson. After writing the song, Nelson moved to Houston, Texas, where due to his financial issues, tried to sell it to Larry Butler. Butler, who rejected to buy the song, employed Nelson instead. After his original songs turned into hits for other artists, Nelson was signed as a recording artist by Liberty Records.

Nelson recorded the song during his second session for the label in Radio Recorders. The song was included as the B-side of the promotional single for ...And Then I Wrote. "Mr. Record Man" received successful Jukebox and airplay in Texas.

== Background ==
In 1957, Nelson lived in Fort Worth, Texas. He quit the music business for a year, becoming a salesman. During this time, he was inspired to write "Mr. Record Man", while he was driving on the highway with the radio turned on. He penned the song about a man, who after listening to a song on his car radio, feels compelled to buy the record, relating the words of the song to his own lost love and sadness.

After his son Billy was born in 1958, struggling with financial issues, he moved to Houston, Texas. On the way, Nelson stopped by the Esquire Ballroom to sell songs to house band singer Larry Butler. Butler refused to purchase Nelson's songs, including "Mr. Record Man", giving him instead a US$50 loan to rent an apartment and a six-night job singing in the club.

During his time in Houston, Nelson sold his original "Family Bible", that turned into a hit for Claude Gray. Despite that he was not credited as the songwriter on the record, he took advantage of the recognition that the song granted him, and moved to Nashville in 1960. While he joined Ray Price's band as a bass player, his songs became hits for other artists, including "Funny How Time Slips Away" (Billy Walker), "Pretty Paper" (Roy Orbison), and, most famously, "Crazy" by Patsy Cline.

== Recordings ==
Leveraged by his prominence as a songwriter, he was signed as a recording artist by Liberty Records in 1961. For his second session with the label, producer Joe Allison took Nelson to Radio Recorders, on September 11–12, 1961.

Nelson's backing included: Billy Strange, Roy Nichols and Johnny Western on guitars; pianist Jim Pierce; bassists Red Wootten and Ray Pohlman; and drummer Roy Harte. During the recording, the backup singers could not follow Nelson's lead singing for his off-beat phrasing. To solve the issue, Allison placed baffles between Nelson and the backup so they could not see each other.

Recorded as a 4/4 Ray Price Shuffle, "Mr. Record Man" was selected as the B-side for the first Willie Nelson single for Liberty Records, and the single to ...And Then I Wrote. The song from his first session, "The Part Where I Cry" was selected as the A-side. On its release in November 1961, Billboard considered the single to have a "moderate sales potential". The single sold 4,000 copies. While "Mr. Record Man" received radio and jukebox play in Texas, it failed to chart.

It was re-recorded in 1965 for Nelson's RCA Records debut album Country Willie – His Own Songs. In 1966, he named his road band "The Record Men". The same year, the song was recorded for the live album Country Music Concert at Panther Hall. Nelson recorded again the song for his 1989 album A Horse Called Music.
