= Crazy: The Demo Sessions =

Demo album by Willie Nelson
- Released: February 11, 2003
- Genre: Country
- Label: Sugar Hill
- Producer: Willie Nelson, Steve Fishell, Hank Cochran

Willie Nelson chronology
The Great Divide (2002)	Crazy: The Demo Sessions (2003)	The Essential Willie Nelson (2003)

Professional ratings
Review scores
Source	Rating
Rolling Stone	4/5 stars

Crazy: The Demo Sessions is an album by American country musician Willie Nelson. It was released on February 11, 2003, on the Sugar Hill label. These demos were recorded between 1960 and 1966 while Nelson was working as a songwriter for Ray Price's music publishing company in Nashville. 2000 vinyl copies were released On April 20, 2013, as a promotion for Record Store Day.

== Track listing ==
All songs written by Willie Nelson, except where noted.

1. "Opportunity to Cry" - 2:27
2. "Three Days" - 1:15
3. "Undo the Right" (Rozell Manely Brown) - 2:59
4. "What Do You Think of Her Now" - 1:14
5. "I've Just Destroyed the World (I'm Living In)" (Willie Nelson, Ray Price)- 1:13
6. "Permanently Lonely" - 2:41
7. "Are You Sure" (Willie Nelson, Buddy Emmons) - 2:05
8. "Darkness on the Face of the Earth" - 1:12
9. "Things to Remember" - 1:46
10. "A Moment Isn't Very Long" - 3:02
11. "Crazy" - 3:58
12. "The Local Memory" - 1:56
13. "I Gotta Get Drunk" - 1:38
14. "Something to Think About" - 3:03
15. "I'm Still Here" - 1:51
16. "Untitled Track" - 7:21

== Chart performance ==
Chart (2003)	Peak position
U.S. Billboard Top Country Albums	32
