= The Part Where I Cry =

Single by Willie Nelson
- B-side: "Mr. Record Man"
- Released: November 1961
- Recorded: August 22, 1961
- Studio: Bradley Studios, Nashville, Tennessee
- Genre: Country
- Length: 2:12
- Label: Liberty
- Songwriter: Willie Nelson
- Producer: Joe Allison

Willie Nelson singles chronology
"Nite Life" (1960)	"The Part Where I Cry" (1961)	"Willingly" (1962)

"The Part Where I Cry" is a song written by country music singer Willie Nelson. After moving to Nashville in 1960, leveraged by the success of his songwriting, and helped by Harlan Howard, Nelson was signed by Joe Allison of Liberty Records.

In August 1961, his first session with the label was held at Bradley Studios, where he recorded the song. It was later coupled with "Mr. Record Man" on the B-side. While it failed to chart, the single received airplay.

== Background ==
During his time in Houston, Nelson sold his original "Family Bible", that turned into a hit for Claude Gray. Despite that he was not credited as the songwriter on the record, he took advantage of the recognition that the song granted him, and moved to Nashville in 1960. While he joined Ray Price's band as a bass player, his songs became hits for other artists, including "Funny How Time Slips Away" (Billy Walker), "Pretty Paper" (Roy Orbison), and, most famously, "Crazy" by Patsy Cline.

Leveraged by his prominence as a songwriter in Nashville, Tennessee, and after his friend Harlan Howard forwarded his songs to producer Joe Allison, Nelson was signed to Liberty Records in 1961.

== Recording and release ==
Nelson entered his first session for Liberty on August 22, 1961, at Bradley Studios in Nashville, Tennessee. Nelson was backed by guitarists Kelso Herston, Ray Edenton (who also played fiddle), Harold Bradley and Grady Martin; drummer Buddy Harman, pianist Hargus "Pig" Robbins, bassist Joe Zinkan and the Anita Kerr singers. During the night, until the early hours of the following day Nelson recorded "The Part Where I Cry", to be the first single release with the label. Allison was not pleased with the results of the session.

The single was coupled with the B-side "Mr. Record Man", recorded during a September session in California. Released in November 1961, Billboard's review predicted a "moderate sales potential". Despite it failed to chart, the song received good airplay on radio stations. It was later included on Nelson's debut album ...And Then I Wrote.
