= Touch Me (Willie Nelson song) =

Single by Willie Nelson
- B-side: "Where My House Lives"
- Released: May 1962
- Recorded: August 22, 1961
- Studio: Bradley Studios, Nashville, Tennessee
- Genre: Country
- Length: 2:10
- Label: Liberty
- Songwriter: Willie Nelson
- Producer: Joe Allison

Willie Nelson singles chronology
"Willingly" (1962)	"Touch Me" (1962)	"Wake Me When It's Over" (1962)

"Touch Me" is a song written and recorded by American country music singer Willie Nelson. Leveraged by the success of his songs, Nelson moved to Nashville in 1960. Through songwriter Harlan Howard, Nelson was signed to write for Pamper Music, and to a recording contract with Liberty Records.

Nelson recorded the song during his first recording session with producer Joe Allison in August 1961. "Touch Me" was released as his second single for the label. Following the success of his previous top-ten duet with Shirley Collie, the song reached number seven on Billboard's Hot Country Singles, becoming Nelson's first solo chart success.

== Background ==
During his time in Houston, Nelson sold his original "Family Bible", that turned into a hit for Claude Gray. Despite that he was not credited as the songwriter on the record, he took advantage of the recognition that the song granted him, and moved to Nashville in 1960. While he joined Ray Price's band as a bass player, his songs became hits for other artists, including "Funny How Time Slips Away" (Billy Walker), "Pretty Paper" (Roy Orbison), and, most famously, "Crazy" by Patsy Cline.

Leveraged by his prominence as a songwriter in Nashville, Tennessee. Nelson met songwriters Harlan Howard and Hank Cochran at Tootsie's Orchid Lounge. After hearing original songs by Nelson, including "Touch Me", Howard convinced his superiors at Pamper publishing to hire Nelson as a songwriter for US$50 a-week. Howard later also forwarded Nelson originals producer Joe Allison, who signed Nelson to Liberty Records in 1961.

== Recording and release ==
Nelson entered his first Liberty session on August 22, 1961, at Bradley Studios in Nashville, Tennessee. Nelson was backed by guitarists Kelso Herston, Ray Edenton (who also played fiddle), Harold Bradley and Grady Martin; drummer Buddy Harman, pianist Hargus "Pig" Robbins, bassist Joe Zinkan and the Anita Kerr singers. During the night, until the early hours of the following day Nelson recorded "Touch Me", for a later single release. Allison was not pleased with the results of the session.

Following the success of his top-ten duet "Willingly", "Touch Me" was released in May 1962, coupled with "Where My House Lives" on the B-side. The single entered Billboard's Hot Country Singles, and peaked at number seven. Billboard's April review described the song as an "Interesting country-styled tune with good lyrics [...] warbled with quiet charm by Nelson". The publication rated it with four stars, declaring that the release had "appeal for both pop and country & western".

"Touch Me" was the same year included on Nelson's debut album ...And Then I Wrote. The single release became Nelson's first chart success as a solo artist, while it would become Nelson's last top ten hit in thirteen years until the release of "Blue Eyes Crying in the Rain" in 1975.

== Chart performance ==
Chart (1962)	Peak position
Billboard Hot Country Singles	7
Bubbling Under the Hot 100	109

== Cover versions ==
- The song was subsequently covered by Dottie West in 1963 and released as a single the same year. It was her first single release with RCA Victor Records and was produced by Chet Atkins. West's version did not enter any Billboard charts nor did it originally appear on an album. '90s country singer Danny Leigh also did a cover version on her 29 days 29 nights Album in 1996
