= Country Winners =

Compilation album by Willie Nelson
- Released: 1973
- Recorded: 1965–1969
- Genre: Country
- Label: RCA

Willie Nelson chronology
Columbus Stockade Blues (1969)	Country Winners (1973)	The Best of (1973)

Professional ratings
Review scores
Source	Rating
Allmusic	link

Country Winners is a 1973 compilation album by country singer Willie Nelson.

Released after Nelson signed with Atlantic, this was the closest thing to a "Greatest Hits" retrospective RCA issued at the time.

Six of the album's nine tracks were originally issued on Nelson's RCA debut, Country Willie - His Own Songs. "The Party's Over", "I Walk Alone" and "The Streets of Laredo" are from other Willie Nelson RCA albums.

== Track listing ==
All tracks composed by Willie Nelson, except where indicated. Unless otherwise stated, all songs were originally issued on Country Willie – His Own Songs, released 1965.

1. "The Party's Over" (from The Party's Over album, issued 1967)
2. "One Day at a Time"
3. "Night Life" (Nelson, Walt Breeland, Paul Buskirk)
4. "Hello Walls"
5. "Mr. Record Man"
6. "My Own Peculiar Way"
7. "Funny How Time Slips Away"
8. "I Walk Alone" (from the My Own Peculiar Way album, issued 1969)
9. "The Streets of Laredo" (Traditional)(from the Texas in My Soul album, issued 1968)

== Personnel ==
- Willie Nelson - Guitar, Vocals.
