= Willingly =

Single by Willie Nelson and Shirley Collie
- B-side: "Our Chain of Love"
- Released: March 17, 1962
- Recorded: November 1961
- Studio: Bradley Studios, Nashville, Tennessee
- Genre: Country
- Length: 2:40
- Label: Liberty
- Songwriter: Hank Cochran
- Producer: Joe Allison

Willie Nelson singles chronology
"The Part Where I Cry" (1961)	"Willingly" (1962)	"Touch Me" (1962)

"Willingly" is a duet by American country music singer Willie Nelson and Shirley Collie, produced by Joe Allison during Nelson's third session for Liberty Records. Released in March 1962, the album reached number ten on Billboard's Hot Country Singles.

== Background ==
Leveraged by his prominence as a songwriter in Nashville, Tennessee, Nelson was signed as a recording artist by Liberty Records in 1961. Nelson produced two sides in his first session, and an entire album after his second one.

While touring with Ray Price as a Cherokee Cowboys bassist, Nelson had attended the Nashville disc jockeys convention. Songwriters Harlan Howard and Hank Cochran visited with Nelson California DJ Biff Collie's hotel room at the Hermitage Hotel. There they met Collie's wife, Shirley, a fellow Liberty recording artist.

During Nelson's second recording session at Radio Recorders, in California, Harlan Howard took Shirley Collie to the studio, where Nelson was cutting "Mr. Record Man". After the Collies attended a Ray Price concert at Harmony Park Ballroom, the couple socialized often with Nelson. While in California, Nelson and Collie began an affair.

== Recording ==
Producer Joe Allison held Nelson's third Liberty Records recording session at Bradley Studios in Nashville in November 1961. The backing was composed of fiddler and guitarist Ray Edenton, pianist Pig Robbins, drummer Buddy Harman, bassist Bob Moore. The band also featured Ray Price's steel guitarist, Jimmy Day and the Anita Kerr singers.

At the persistence of Nelson, Allison added Shirley Collie to the session. Collie sang the lead on "Willingly", with Nelson blending on a high tenor to join her voice. The session also produced the duet "Our Chain of Love", that was used as the flipside of the single.

== Release ==
On its January 1962 review, Billboard rated the single with four stars with "strong sales potential". The review noted the song as a "pleasant duo blend work on effective country theme with good lyrics".

The single was released on March 17, 1962, reaching by May number ten on Billboard's Top country singles.

== Chart performance ==
Chart (1962)	Peak position
Billboard Hot Country Singles	10
