= Columbus Stockade Blues =

Columbus Stockade Blues and Other Country Favorites

Compilation album by Willie Nelson
- Released: 1970
- Recorded: 1965
- Genre: Country
- Length: 22:45
- Label: RCA

Willie Nelson chronology
Columbus Stockade Blues and Other Country Favorites (1970)	Country Winners (1973)

Professional ratings
Review scores
Source	Rating
Allmusic	2/5 stars

Columbus Stockade Blues is a 1970 album by country singer Willie Nelson. It is an abridged reissue of Nelson's 1966 album, Country Favorites-Willie Nelson Style without the songs "Making Believe", "Home In San Antone", and "My Window Faces The South".

== Track listing ==
1. "Columbus Stockade Blues" - (Thomas Darby) - 1:59
2. "I Love You Because" - (Leon Payne) - 2:59
3. "Heartaches by the Number" - (Harlan Howard) - 2:20
4. "Seasons of My Heart" - (George Jones, Darrell Edwards) - 2:45
5. "San Antonio Rose" - (Bob Wills) - 2:09
6. "Don't You Ever Get Tired (Of Hurting Me)" - (Hank Cochran) - 2:59
7. "Fraulein" - (Lawton Williams) - 2:55
8. "Go on Home" - (Hank Cochran) - 2:16
9. "I'd Trade All of My Tomorrows (For Just One Yesterday)" - (Jenny Lou Carson) - 2:23

== Personnel ==
- Willie Nelson - Vocals, guitar

== Early version ==
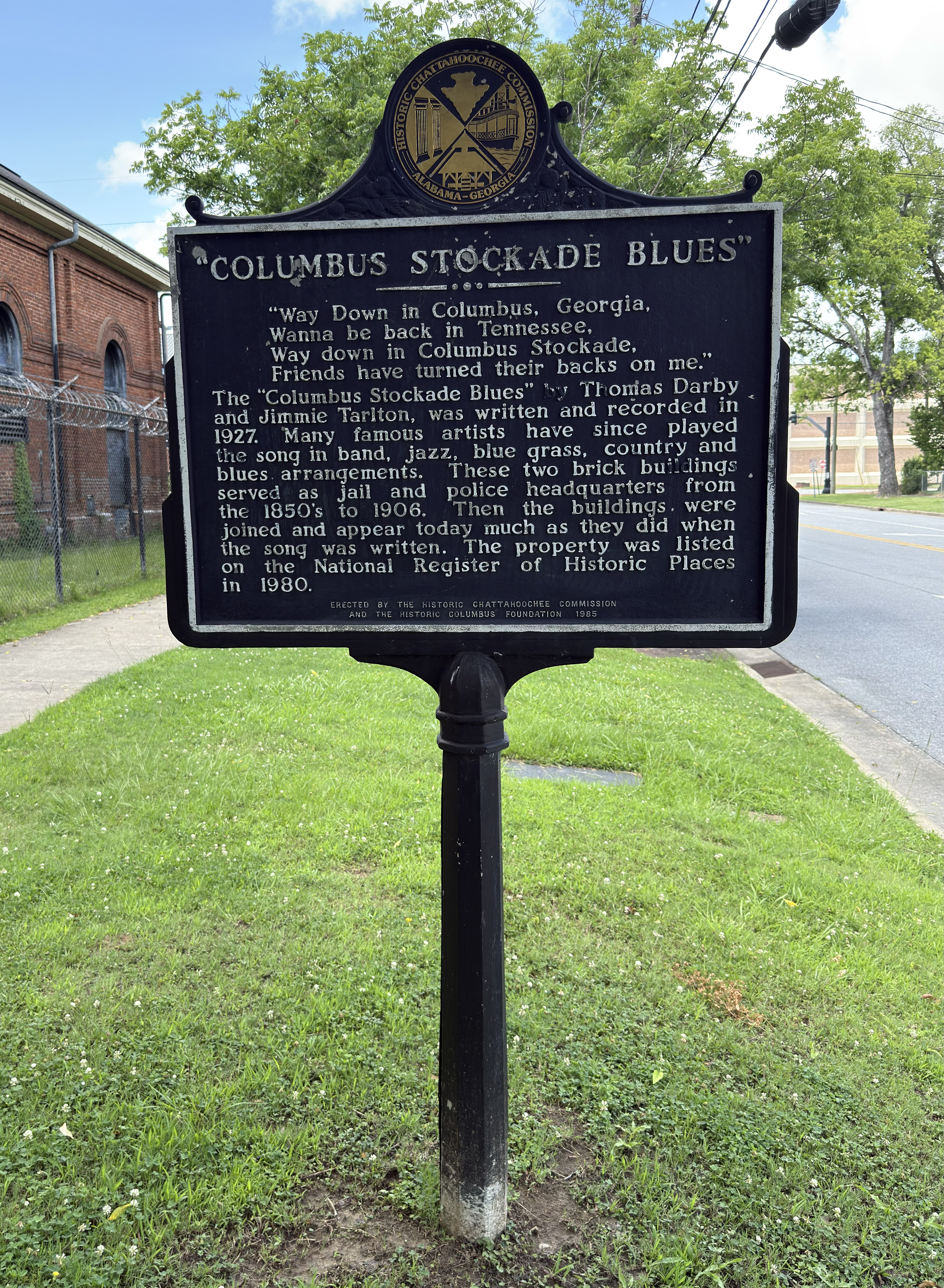
Historical marker

The traditional country song "Columbus Stockade Blues" was written by Thomas Darby in 1927 and first performed and recorded by the early country music duo Darby and Tarlton (Tom Darby and Jimmie Tarlton) and later recorded in 1930 by Cliff Carlisle in the album Cliff Carlisle - A Country Legacy 1930 - 1933.

ColumbusStockadeBlues
