= The Willie Way =

Studio album by Willie Nelson
- Released: June 1972
- Genre: Country
- Length: 27:31
- Label: RCA Victor
- Producer: Felton Jarvis

Willie Nelson chronology
The Words Don't Fit the Picture (1972)	The Willie Way (1972)	Shotgun Willie (1973)

The Willie Way is the fifteenth studio album by country singer Willie Nelson. This was also the last album of new material released by RCA Records before Nelson's departure for Atlantic Records and move to Austin, Texas.

== Background ==
The Willie Way capped off Nelson's underwhelming seven-year tenure at RCA Records. He never attained the same success as a recording artist that he had as a songwriter, and became more frustrated with not being allowed to use his own band on his recording sessions. Producer Chet Atkins adhered to the Nashville Sound with Nelson, smothering his songs with violins and syrupy background vocalists in an attempt to break him as a national star, but the efforts proved fruitless. By the early seventies the apathy seemed to cut both ways, with author Michael Streissguth noting that The Willie Way “arrived in stores packaged in the most unimaginative album sleeve ever to come out of Nashville.” The album includes his first cover of Kris Kristofferson’s “Help Me Make It Through the Night,” which Nelson would recut for Sings Kristofferson in 1979. An overdubbed version of "You Left Me a Long, Long Time Ago” would be included as a bonus track on the 20th Anniversary edition of Wanted! The Outlaws

== Reception ==
Professional ratings
Review scores
Source	Rating
AllMusic	3/5 stars

At the time of the album's release Rolling Stone’s Chet Flippo wrote that Nelson “sang with a freshness drawn from his own blues-tinged country style.” Jim Worbois of AllMusic states, “’You Left Me a Long, Long Time Ago’ is worth the price of this record alone. Also, Willie's version of ‘Undo the Right’ is easily as good as Johnny Bush's 1968 hit."

== Release history ==
Like most of Willie's RCA albums, this was never issued on any tape format. "The Willie Way" finally saw release on compact disc from Wounded Bird Records in September 2011, as part of a "twofer" with 1966's "Country Music Concert". In 2017, reissue label Friday Music remastered and reissued this album, making the album available on vinyl for the first time in 45 years.

== Track listing ==
All tracks composed by Willie Nelson, except where indicated.

1. "You Left Me a Long, Long Time Ago" 2:41
2. "Wonderful Future" 2:39
3. "Help Me Make It Through the Night" (Kris Kristofferson) 3:00
4. "Wake Me When It's Over" 3:46
5. "Undo the Right" (Nelson, Hank Cochran) 2:21
6. "Mountain Dew" (Bascom Lamar Lunsford, Scotty Wiseman) 2:09
7. "Home Is Where You're Happy" 3:03
8. "A Moment Isn't Very Long" 3:07
9. "What Do You Want Me to Do?" 2:31
10. "I'd Rather You Didn't Love Me" 2:40

== Personnel ==
- Willie Nelson - guitar, vocals
- Al Pachucki, Les Ladd - recording engineers
- Roy Shockley, Mike Shockley - recording technicians
- Jimmy Moore - cover photography

== Charts ==
Chart (1972)	Peak position
US Top Country Albums (Billboard)	34
