= I Never Cared for You =

"I Never Cared For You"

Single by Willie Nelson
- B-side: "You Left Me (A Long Time Ago)"
- Released: October 1964
- Recorded: July 1964
- Genre: Country
- Length: 2:26
- Label: Monument
- Songwriter: Willie Nelson
- Producer: Fred Foster

Willie Nelson singles chronology
"River Boy" (1964)	"I Never Cared For You" (1964)	"Pretty Paper" (1964)

"I Never Cared For You" is a song written by country music singer Willie Nelson. Nelson recorded the song during his stint with Monument Records, and eventually became his only single released by the label.

While the release failed to achieve national success, it was well received in Texas. Nelson re-recorded the song and included it in several album releases.

== Background and recording ==
By early 1964, Nelson left Liberty Records after the release of his debut album, ...And Then I Wrote. At the time, Nelson was approached by Chet Atkins of RCA Records, who talked to him about the possibility of being signed by the label. Ultimately, Nelson decided instead to join Monument Records.

The first session with the label, on July 6 produced by Fred Foster resulted in a failure. Foster's initial idea for the three-song session included French horns, trumpets and xylophones. For the following session in the third week of July that produced "I Never Cared For You", Foster stripped the band down to a guitar, bass, drums and a saxophone.

The musicians included classical guitar player David Parker, bassist Bob Moore, drummer Jack Greubel, and saxophonist Boots Randolph. During the recording, Moore complained that Nelson broke meter constantly, and that he was impossible to follow. Foster, meanwhile instructed him to stop playing, and told him that he would later overdub the bass.

== Release and reception ==
Backed with "You Left Me (A long Time Ago)" on the B-side, "I Never Cared For You" was released in October 1964. It became the only single that Nelson released on Monument Records. The complex nature of the lyrics at the time did not favor its reception on the Country and Western market. The single flopped on the national market, while it became a local hit in Texas, enjoying major success in Houston. Nelson soon after resumed talks with Chet Atkins, and left Monument to join RCA Records.

The song became a recurrent track in Nelson's albums. He released new versions of the song with his albums Me & Paul, A Horse Called Music, Teatro and December Day.
