= Willie Nelson and Family =

Studio album by Willie Nelson
- Released: 1971
- Studios: RCA Studio B (Nashville, Tennessee)
- Genre: Country
- Length: 32:18
- Label: RCA Victor
- Producer: Felton Jarvis

Willie Nelson chronology
Laying My Burdens Down (1970)	Willie Nelson and Family (1971)	Yesterday's Wine (1971)

Willie Nelson and Family is the twelfth studio album by American country music singer Willie Nelson, released in 1971.

== Background ==
Although Nelson continued to be frustrated with the production and poor sales of his albums at RCA, his live show continued to develop in the early seventies as he started acquiring the core members of his band – Bee Spears on bass, Paul English on drums, Mickey Raphael on harmonica, and his sister Bobbie on piano - which he referred to as “Family.” Nelson later recalled after first playing with Raphael he “began to see how, rather than as an occasional sit-in, he could become part of my family – a loose term that I started using to describe my band. As a depiction of people coming together to make music, I like the term 'family' more than 'band.' It’s a warmer word that suggests genuine care and love.” Nelson had also discovered his Martin N-20 classical guitar, known as “Trigger,” which further contributed to his evolving live sound, but his albums at RCA remained mired in the staid Nashville formula. In the 2003 documentary Lost Highway the singer explained, “I had a pretty good following on the road travelling but what I was doing wasn’t coming out on the record, and I felt like if we could’ve got into the studio with the band, and do it the way we’d been doing it every night, we would’ve had a better chance.” Nelson would get his opportunity to record with his band in 1973 when he recorded the LP Shotgun Willie in New York's Atlantic Studios with Jerry Wexler, but Willie Nelson and Family followed the same production blueprint as his recent RCA albums.

== Recording and composition ==
The collection contains a mix of covers, such as the Hank Williams classic "I'm So Lonesome I Could Cry", and original compositions, including the prophetic "What Can You Do to Me Now?", a forlorn ballad Nelson wrote with Hank Cochran in December 1970 just days before his house burned down on December 23. The Texan later quipped, "Even though the title – 'What Can You Do to Me Now?' – seemed to invite trouble, the story was really about getting strong in the face of adversity." Nelson also wrote "I'm a Memory", which was released as a single and reached number 28 on the country singles chart. Willie Nelson and Family also contains Nelson's first cover of "Today I Started Loving You Again", written by Merle Haggard and Bonnie Owens. Haggard later appeared at Nelson's first Dripping Springs Picnic in 1974 and recorded several duet albums with Nelson. In his 2015 autobiography Nelson wrote:

Also sang Merle Haggard's "Today I Started Loving You Again"...I met him when he was playing bass with Wynn Stewart at the Nashville Nevada Club in Las Vegas...Merle was another one of those rugged individualists who, like me, was trying to make sense of all the nonsense in the music business. We became buddies for life."

Nelson, who covered Joni Mitchell and Fred Neil on his Both Sides Now album, continued to show his appreciation for the new generation of singer-songwriters of the youth culture at the time by recording James Taylor's "Fire and Rain". Nelson had also started cutting material by more progressive country tune-smiths like Mickey Newbury and, on this album, Kris Kristofferson, a "brilliant writer" whose "Sunday Morning Coming Down" contained the poetic realism similar to his own lyrics. Nelson re-recorded the song on his tribute LP Sings Kristofferson in 1979.

== Critical reception ==
AllMusic: “Over the years, Nelson has shown that he sometimes looks at relationships differently than the average songwriter (such as ‘Crazy’), with a little more thought and from new perspectives. After all, not everyone's life is moon, June, and honeymoon. Two of the finest examples of the Willie way are on this album: ‘I'm A Memory’ and, especially, ‘What Can You Do to Me Now?’

== Release history ==
Like most of Nelson's albums from RCA, this was never issued on tape. In addition, as of 2023, this album is one of three original Willie Nelson RCA albums that have not been reissued in its original form (the others are 1967's "'The Party's Over' and Other Great Willie Nelson Songs" and 1970's "Laying My Burdens Down".

However, all ten of the album's songs were issued on the 1998 box set "Nashville Was The Roughest...", an eight-disc collection of the songs Nelson recorded for RCA and Monument Records from July 1964 to April 1972. In addition, some of the album's songs, such as "Fire and Rain" and "I'm A Memory", saw popularity after Nelson's rise to prominence.

Professional ratings
Review scores
Source	Rating
Allmusic	link

== Track listing ==
No.	Title	Writer(s)	Length
1.	"What Can You Do to Me Now?"	Willie Nelson, Hank Cochran	3:27
2.	"Sunday Morning Coming Down"	Kris Kristofferson	5:48
3.	"I'm So Lonesome I Could Cry""	Hank Williams	2:24
4.	"Fire and Rain"	James Taylor	2:57
5.	"Kneel at the Feet of Jesus""	Nelson	2:47
6.	"I'm a Memory"	Nelson	2:24
7.	"Yours Love"	Harlan Howard	3:02
8.	"I Can Cry Again"	Nelson	2:57
9.	"That's Why I Love Her So"	Nelson	2:31
10.	"Today I Started Loving You Again"	Merle Haggard, Bonnie Owens	4:01

== Personnel ==
- Willie Nelson - guitar, vocals
- Glen Spreen - arrangements

== Charts ==
Chart (1971)	Peak position
US Top Country Albums (Billboard)	43

== Bibliography ==
- Nelson, Willie; Ritz, David (2015). It's A Long Story: My Life. Little, Brown and Company. ISBN 9780316339315.
