= Country Willie: His Own Songs =

Studio album by Willie Nelson
- Released: 1965
- Studio: RCA Victor Studios, Nashville, Tennessee
- Genre: Country
- Length: 24:27
- Label: RCA Victor
- Producer: Chet Atkins

Willie Nelson chronology
Here's Willie Nelson (1963)	Country Willie: His Own Songs (1965)	Country Favorites-Willie Nelson Style (1966)

Country Willie: His Own Songs is the third studio album by country singer Willie Nelson. It was his first for RCA Victor.

== Background ==
Liberty released Nelson's first two albums, ...And Then I Wrote and Here’s Willie Nelson, in 1962 and 1963 respectively, after country stars like Faron Young, Billy Walker, and Patsy Cline had scored huge hits with his songs. However, these albums bore little resemblance to the ones he would later become famous for, as they were augmented with the lush instrumentation that was typical of the Nashville sound. “The critical praise was strong,” Nelson later remembered, “but the public’s reception remained lukewarm. It was my live performances...that helped me cultivate a small but loyal following.” With the arrival of The Beatles in 1964, Liberty abandoned their country division and, after a stint as a pig farmer in Ridgetop, Tennessee, Nelson was signed to RCA by Chet Atkins. Nelson admired Atkins, but also had reservations: “I liked Chet. I had great respect for his hit-making history and, of course, his own masterful musicianship. I had a feeling, though, that like so many others on Music Row, Chet saw me as an outsider writing outsider songs and singing in an outsider style. For all practical purposes, Chet was the ultimate Nashville insider.”

== Recording and composition ==
Atkins and Nelson first worked together on the Christmas single “Pretty Paper” in November 1964, and in January and April 1965 recorded sessions that made up the bulk of Country Willie: His Own Songs. It contains remakes of his best known compositions up to that time, such as “Night Life” and “Funny How Time Slips Away,” as well as newer songs like "Healing Hands of Time." Nelson later said of "One Day at a Time" and "It Should Be Easier Now," "These are songs of a very personal nature, but everyone can apply them to their own situation." Nelson biographer Joe Nick Potoski observes:

The album also introduced originals, such as the spiritual-on-the-surface but creepy-when-you-think-about-it “Healing Hands of Time,” along with “Darkness on the Face of the Earth” and two numbers that spoke of Willie’s evolving personal philosophy, “My Own Peculiar Way” and “One Day at a Time.” The songs were wrapped in over-wrought semi-orchestral arrangements not unlike what Ernie Freeman did for his Liberty recordings.

In his 2015 memoir, Nelson said of the LP:

At RCA, I tried to follow Chet Atkins as best I could. I went along with his suggestion that we call my first album for the label Country Willie: His Own Songs. I also went along with his idea that I rerecord some of my songs that had been hits for other artists...On all of them, though, Chet added the requisite sweeteners – heavy string sections and heavenly choirs that were supposedly making my music more palatable. It didn’t work.

In 1975, a similarly titled compilation album was released on United Artists. Titled simply Country Willie, it was a collection of B-sides and album tracks from Nelson's tenure at Liberty Records.

== Reception ==
Professional ratings
Review scores
Source	Rating
AllMusic	4.5/5 stars
Record Mirror	3/5 stars

AllMusic writes, "While some of these tunes showed up in their original versions on the United Artist album Best of Willie Nelson, this is still worth tracking down.” Nelson biographer Joe Nick Potoski notes, “Sales were puny, the one exception being Texas, where the album solidified Willie’s standing as a genuine Nashville star, one sure way to sell tickets to a show.”

== Track listing ==
All tracks composed by Willie Nelson; except where noted.

1. "One Day at a Time" – 2:32
2. "My Own Peculiar Way" – 2:55
3. "Night Life" (Willie Nelson, Paul Buskirk, Walt Breeland) – 2:25
4. "Funny How Time Slips Away" – 2:39
5. "Healing Hands of Time" – 2:20
6. "Darkness on the Face of the Earth" – 2:26
7. "Hello Walls" – 2:11
8. "Are You Sure" (Nelson, Buddy Emmons) – 2:10
9. "Mr. Record Man" – 2:13
10. "It Should Be Easier Now" – 2:43
11. "So Much to Do" – 2:10
12. "Within Your Crowd" – 2:04

== Personnel ==
- Willie Nelson – guitar, vocals
- Jim Malloy – engineer

== Bibliography ==
- Nelson, Willie; Shrake, Bud (1988). Willie: An Autobiography. Simon and Schuster. ISBN 978-0671680756.
- Nelson, Willie; Ritz, David (2015). It's A Long Story: My Life. Little, Brown and Company. ISBN 9780316339315.
- Patoski, Joe Nick (2008). Willie Nelson: An Epic Life. Hachette Digital. ISBN 978-0-316-01778-7.
