= Here's Willie Nelson =

Studio album by Willie Nelson
- Released: 1963
- Genre: Country
- Length: 28:20
- Label: Liberty
- Producer: Tommy Allsup

Willie Nelson chronology
...And Then I Wrote (1962)	Here's Willie Nelson (1963)	Country Willie: His Own Songs (1965)

Here's Willie Nelson is the second studio album by country singer Willie Nelson.

== Background ==
After working as a disc jockey in Texas and Oregon, Nelson moved to Nashville in 1960 in hopes of making a living as a songwriter and recording artist. He found work writing compositions for Pamper Music and scored his first hit when Faron Young recorded “Hello Walls.” More hits followed, including Patsy Cline’s classic rendition of “Crazy,” but Nelson, who played bass on tour with Ray Price during this period, wanted to be a recording artist in his own right, and recorded his debut album, ...And Then I Wrote for Liberty in 1962. He scored a Top 10 hit with “Touch Me,” but the LP was not a huge seller. Against his better judgement, Nelson would allow his songs to be heavily augmented when he returned to the studio, later admitting, “I didn’t argue. In those days, big productions like Johnny Cash’s ‘Ring of Fire’ were huge hits. So if it worked for Johnny, maybe it’d work for me. I went along with the program.”

== Recording and Composition ==
After failing to deliver a hit for Liberty, Joe Allison, who produced Nelson’s debut, was replaced by Tommy Allsup, who would go on to produce twenty-six sides on the singer between December 1962 and November 1963. Some of those tracks found their way onto his second album, on which Nelson’s voice was complemented by a pronounced country and swing sound, although the tracks arranged by Ernie Freeman blatantly pushed him in a pop or jazz direction. Unlike his debut, Here’s Willie Nelson contains more cover songs, including two made famous by Bob Wills and the Texas Playboys, “Roly Poly” and “Right or Wrong.” Wills, one of Nelson’s idols, would also write the liner notes for the LP.

Nelson worked out several songs on his second album while touring with his wife Shirley Collie and steel guitarist Jimmy Day while playing shows as the trio The Offenders. Nelson later expressed dissatisfaction with the recorded version of “Home Motel,” a song he described as “another study in despair,” and it was typical of the frustration that he would feel regarding the tepid sound of his albums in the decade ahead:

It was a thrill to play the song live. Jimmy Day had his steel guitar weeping just enough, and Shirley added just a touch of harmony, and I got to sing my blues the way the blues should be sung: no frills. Yet when I brought the song into the Liberty studios, the producers felt compelled to put on the frills. “Aren’t you worried you’re burying the soul of the song?” I asked. “More worried about the song not selling,” was the usual answer.

In his 2015 memoir, Willie admitted that “Half a Man” was “one of my stranger songs. It’s about a guy who considers what it would be like, in the name of lost love, to start losing body parts...This wasn’t exactly a song that made you want to dance.” The song was released as a single but only made it to number 25, with Allsup recalling, "Half the country stations wouldn't play 'Half a Man' because they thought it was morbid." Years later Nelson would record the song as two different duets with Merle Haggard and George Jones.

Professional ratings
Review scores
Source	Rating
AllMusic	2.5/5 stars

== Track listing ==
Side one
No.	Title	Writer(s)	Length
1.	"Roly Poly"	Fred Rose	1:50
2.	"Half a Man"	Willie Nelson	2:25
3.	"Lonely Little Mansion"	Nelson	2:23
4.	"The Last Letter"	Rex Griffin	2:55
5.	"Second Fiddle"	Roger Miller	2:24
6.	"Take My Word"	Nelson	1:50

Side two
No.	Title	Writer(s)	Length
1.	"Right or Wrong"	Haven Gillespie; Arthur Sizemore; Paul Biese	2:10
2.	"Feed It a Memory"	Hank Cochran; Justin Tubb	2:31
3.	"Let Me Talk to You"	Danny Dill; Don Davis	2:20
4.	"Way You See Me"	Nelson	2:55
5.	"Things I Might Have Been"	Robert B. Sherman; Richard M. Sherman	2:13
6.	"Home Motel"	Nelson	2:24

== Personnel ==
Partial credits.

- Willie Nelson – lead vocals, guitar
- Tommy Jackson – fiddle
- Jerry Kennedy – guitar
- Wayne Moss – guitar
- Fred Carter, Jr. – guitar
- Earl Palmer – drums
- Ernie Freeman – arrangements
- Jimmy Day – arrangements, possible pedal steel guitar

Technical

- Eddie Brackett – engineer

The chorus of “Half a Man” was accentuated by female backing singers whose names are currently not known.

== Bibliography ==
- Thomson, Graeme (2012). Willie Nelson: The Outlaw. Virgin Books. ISBN 978-0-7535-1184-8.
- Nelson, Willie; Ritz, David (2015). It's A Long Story: My Life. Little, Brown and Company. ISBN 9780316339315.
- Patoski, Joe Nick (2008). Willie Nelson: An Epic Life. Hachette Digital. ISBN 978-0-316-01778-7.
- Rolling Stone staff (2010). "Song Stories. "Half a Man" Willie Nelson, 1963". Rolling Stone. Archived from the original on July 29, 2014.
