= Bring Me Sunshine =

1966 song by Arthur Kent and Sylvia Dee

- "Bring Me Sunshine" BBC CD cover

Song
- Written: 1966
- Composer: Arthur Kent
- Lyricist: Sylvia Dee

"Bring Me Sunshine" is a song written in 1966 by the composer Arthur Kent, with lyrics by Sylvia Dee. It was first recorded by The Mills Brothers in 1968, on their album My Shy Violet. In the UK, the song is associated with the popular comedy duo Morecambe & Wise, after it was adopted as their signature tune in their second series for the BBC in 1969.

== Musical influences ==
Professor of Critical Musicology at the University of Leeds, Prof Derek B Scott, argues that the song is influenced by the Viennese popular style. He writes:

"The melody implies a minor key, with harmonies on the tonic and subdominant. This would, of course, be bizarre and inappropriate for the words "Bring me sunshine in Your Smile / Bring me laughter all the while". But we find that the tonality is actually the relative major of the key implied by the tune, and the harmonies consist of the tonic (with a free-floating sixth) and dominant ninth. Suddenly the words and music make perfect sense, the tension of the dissonances conveying the sense of an appeal for sunshine, rather than the actual presence of sunshine."

== Morecambe & Wise version ==
Morecambe & Wise in their classic "skip dance" pose, performed to "Bring Me Sunshine"

=== Skip-dance ===
Although the second verse was often performed by an orchestra conducted by Peter Knight over the duo's closing credits, they only ever sang the first verse, the second one being purely instrumental, with Eric and Ernie performing a "skip dance" to exit the stage. The dance has been attributed to BBC producer, John Ammonds, and Eric's son Gary recalls that the inspiration for the skip-dance came from a Groucho Marx film sequence.

=== Morecambe & Wise tributes ===
When Eric Morecambe died in 1984 so closely associated were the pair with the song that it was the title of the Bring Me Sunshine tribute show at the London Palladium held in his memory. Ten years later, the BBC ran another 3-part tribute, also titled Bring Me Sunshine.

Lyrics to the song were also read at Morecambe's funeral by Ernie Wise. Wise went on to declare it his favourite song during his appearance on the BBC radio programme, Desert Island Discs in Oct 1990. On the same programme three months later, the song was also a choice of jazz singer Adelaide Hall, and has since been the choice of several other guests including Dawn French and Rankin. It has also been used for the title of several books about the pair.

When Morecambe & Wise defected from the BBC to Thames Television in 1978, directly after their record-breaking Christmas Special the previous year, the signature tune was dropped. It was however used in later instalments of these shows.

=== BBC promotional clip ===
In 2011, the BBC used the song in a promotional clip for the 75th anniversary of its main channel, beginning with the familiar opening shot of Morecambe & Wise before leading into a montage of other famous moments from the channel's history, most of which were edited so as to lip-sync with the song.

=== Morecambe FC ===
Morecambe Football Club often plays the song both prior to and after their games, whilst the club's fans have adopted the song as the "official anthem".

== Willie Nelson version ==
The 30 November 1968 edition of Billboard magazine predicted that Willie Nelson's version of "Bring Me Sunshine" (produced by Chet Atkins and Felton Jarvis), would reach the Top 20 in the Country Single Charts, eventually reaching #13 in 1969. It was included in 1974 on the budget compilation album, Spotlight on Willie Nelson. A different mix appears on Nelson's 2009 album Naked Willie; this version is featured in the closing credits of the 2010 film The Crazies. In 2013, Willie Nelson's version was used as the theme to ITV sitcom The Job Lot.

== Other recordings ==
The song has also been recorded by:

- 1969 Brenda Lee, on her album, Johnny One Time.
- 1969 Jack Greene, on his album, Statue of a Fool.
- 1970 Chet Atkins, on his album, Yestergroovin'.
- 1971 Liz Damon's Orient Express, on their eponymous album.
- 1974 Willie Nelson, on his album, Spotlight on Willie Nelson.
- 1978 Mickey Gilley, on his album, Mickey at Gilleys.
- 1999 Cliff Adams Singers, on their album, Sing Something Simple Collection: Sentimental Journey.
- 2003 Mrs Mills (Gladys Mills), on her album, The Very Best of Mrs. Mills.
- 2006 Richard Shelton, on his album, Top Cat.
- 2010 Foster & Allen, on their album of the same name, which peaked at number 14 in March 2011 in the New Zealand charts.
- 2011 Oleg Frish with Patrick Williams & His Big Band, on the album, Bring Me Sunshine.
- 2012 The Jive Aces on their album King of the Swingers: A Salute to Louis Prima
- 2014 Violetta Zironi for the TV commercial of the popular Italian brand of cookies Pavesini.
- 2015 Sophie Madeleine as a single. This version was featured in the 2025 film Superman.
- 2017 Michael Ball & Alfie Boe with the Rays of Sunshine Children's Choir & Friends to raise money for the Rays of Sunshine Children's Charity
- Ken Bruce and his then travel reporter Lynn Bowles recorded a version for charity.
- Singer Ashleigh Wood recorded a version for her album My Journey in homage to the town of Morecambe.
