= Spotlight on Willie Nelson =

Compilation album by Willie Nelson
- Released: 1974
- Genre: Country
- Label: RCA Camden Records
- Producer: Felton Jarvis

Willie Nelson chronology
The Best of (1973)	Spotlight on Willie Nelson (1974)	Country Willie (1975)

Professional ratings
Review scores
Source	Rating
Allmusic	link

Spotlight on Willie Nelson is a 1974 compilation album by country singer Willie Nelson.

This album picked up where 1973's "Country Winners" left off, concentrating mostly on RCA material released 1970-72. "Bring Me Sunshine" makes its LP debut, albeit in "reprocessed" stereo form. It would not be until 1998, 24 years after the release of this album that "Bring Me Sunshine" would be issued in true stereo.

== Track listing ==
1. "Bloody Mary Morning"
2. "One Has My Name (The Other Has My Heart)"
3. "Yours Love"
4. "Everybody's Talkin'"
5. "Today I Started Loving You Again"
6. "Bring Me Sunshine"
7. "San Antonio"
8. "I'm So Lonesome I Could Cry"
9. "Wabash Cannonball"

== Personnel ==
- Willie Nelson – guitar, vocals
