= The Words Don't Fit the Picture =

Studio album by Willie Nelson
- Released: 1972
- Genre: Country
- Length: 27:45
- Label: RCA Victor
- Producer: Felton Jarvis

Willie Nelson chronology
Yesterday's Wine (1971)	The Words Don't Fit the Picture (1972)	The Willie Way (1972)

The Words Don't Fit the Picture is the fourteenth studio album by country singer Willie Nelson.

== Background ==
By 1972 Nelson had made fourteen albums for RCA with not much to show for it. RCA head Chet Atkins stuck to the formula of the Nashville Sound, which had churned out hits for other country stars throughout the sixties but did not complement Nelson's highly stylized musicianship, and promotion behind Nelson's LPs had been historically non-existent. Further alienating Nelson was the label's perplexed reaction to his 1971 concept album Yesterday’s Wine, a suite of songs examining mortality influenced by the Bible and the works of Edgar Cayce. Nelson's live shows bore little resemblance to the sound of his RCA albums, and Atkins refusal to allow him to record with his band left him disillusioned.

== Recording and composition ==
As Atkins scaled back his production duties at RCA, Nelson worked more with Felton Jarvis, who also produced Fats Domino, Skeeter Davis, and Elvis Presley. The album was recorded at RCA Studios in Nashville and contains all Nelson originals. The album is most notable for containing Nelson's first solo recording of "Good Hearted Woman", a song he composed with his friend Waylon Jennings. Jennings, who had been fighting many of the same battles with RCA as Nelson, started writing the song and asked Nelson to help him finish it during a late-night poker game at the Fort Worther Motel on Jacksboro Highway in Fort Worth. By all accounts, Nelson's contribution was minimal, with his third wife Connie recalling, "The only part Willie came up with was ‘Through teardrops and laughter they walk through this world hand in hand.’ Waylon said, ‘That’s it! That’s what’s missing’ and gave Willie half the song." Nelson also collaborated with songwriter Don Bowman on "Stay Away From Lonely Places". Bowman previously wrote "Just to Satisfy You" with Jennings, a song Waylon and Willie would take to the top of the charts in 1982.

The album cover, shot by Jimmy Moore, portends Nelson's impending stylistic change - flanked by his wife, Connie, and his producer Felton Jarvis, dressed as a chauffeur, Nelson poses in front of a Rolls-Royce in full-freak cowboy regalia, battered guitar case in tow.

== Reception ==
Professional ratings
Review scores
Source	Rating
AllMusic	3/5 stars

Jim Worbois of AllMusic states, "Another fine album of Willie originals, it's not quite as strong as some of his other albums released about this time, but still good."

== Release History ==
Unlike most Willie Nelson albums from this time period, this was also issued on 8-track cartridge (RCA P8S-1892).

In 2017, reissue label Vinyl Me, Please remastered and reissued this album for the first time. Six years later, the Netherlands-based label Music on CD issued this album on Compact Disc, under license from RCA/Sony.

== Track listing ==
All tracks composed by Willie Nelson, except where indicated

1. "The Words Don't Fit the Picture" (2:47)
2. "Good Hearted Woman" (Nelson, Waylon Jennings) (2:59)
3. "Stay Away from Lonely Places" (Nelson, Don Bowman) (2:57)
4. "Country Willie" (2:36)
5. "London" (2:53)
6. "One Step Beyond" (2:01)
7. "My Kind of Girl" (2:34)
8. "Will You Remember?" (3:32)
9. "Rainy Day Blues" (3:15)
10. "If You Really Loved Me" (2:11)

== Personnel ==
- Willie Nelson - vocals, guitar

== Bibliography ==
- Nelson, Willie; Ritz, David (2015). It's A Long Story: My Life. Little, Brown and Company. ISBN 9780316339315.
- Patoski, Joe Nick (2008). Willie Nelson: An Epic Life. Hachette Digital. ISBN 978-0-316-01778-7.
