= Pretty Paper (album) =

1979 Christmas studio album by Willie Nelson

Studio album by Willie Nelson
- Released: November 6, 1979
- Genres: Christmas music; country
- Length: 29:15
- Label: Columbia
- Producer: Booker T. Jones

Willie Nelson chronology
Sings Kristofferson (1979)	Pretty Paper (1979)	The Electric Horseman (1980)

Professional ratings
Review scores
Source	Rating
Allmusic	link

Pretty Paper is the first Christmas album and 24th studio album by country singer Willie Nelson. It was also his last release of the 1970s. Nelson reunited with producer/arranger Booker T. Jones, with whom he had collaborated on the acclaimed Stardust album released the year before.

The self-composed title track had been a hit Christmas song in 1963, when it was recorded by Roy Orbison. Nelson had previously recorded the song in 1964.

== Track listing ==
Side one
No.	Title	Writer(s)	Length
1.	"White Christmas"	Irving Berlin	2:46
2.	"Winter Wonderland"	Felix Bernard; Richard Bernhard Smith	2:26
3.	"Rudolph the Red-Nosed Reindeer"	Johnny Marks	2:12
4.	"Jingle Bells"	James Lord Pierpont	2:11
5.	"Here Comes Santa Claus"	Gene Autry; Oakley Haldeman	1:53
6.	"Blue Christmas"	Billy Hayes; Jay W. Johnson	2:40

Side two
No.	Title	Writer(s)	Length
1.	"Santa Claus Is Coming to Town"	J. Fred Coots; Haven Gillespie	2:13
2.	"Frosty the Snowman"	Steve Nelson; Jack Rollins	2:27
3.	"Silent Night"	Joseph Mohr; Franz Xaver Gruber	3:46
4.	"Little Town of Bethlehem"	Phillips Brooks; Lewis Redner	1:27
5.	"Christmas Blues" (Instrumental)	Willie Nelson; Booker T. Jones	3:13
6.	"Pretty Paper"	Willie Nelson	2:28
Total length:			29:42

The 1984 CD release places "Pretty Paper" as the first track instead of the last. The remaining tracks are in the same order listed.

== Personnel ==
- Willie Nelson – Vocals, guitar
- Paul English – Drums
- Chris Ethridge – Bass
- Bradley Hartman – Engineer
- Booker T. Jones – Arranger, Keyboards
- Rex Ludwick – Drums
- Jody Payne – Guitar
- Mickey Raphael – Harmonica
- Bee Spears – Bass

== Certifications ==
Certifications for Pretty Paper
Region	Certification	Certified units/sales
Canada (Music Canada)	Gold	50,000^{^}
United States (RIAA)	Platinum	1,000,000^{^}
^{^} Shipments figures based on certification alone.
