= Laying My Burdens Down =

Studio album by Willie Nelson
- Released: September 1970
- Genre: Country
- Length: 24:35
- Label: RCA Victor
- Producer: Felton Jarvis

Willie Nelson chronology
Both Sides Now (1970)	Laying My Burdens Down (1970)	Willie Nelson and Family (1971)

Laying My Burdens Down is the eleventh studio album by country singer Willie Nelson, released in late 1970.

== Background ==
Laying My Burdens Down was Nelson's second RCA release of 1970 and fourth in two years, but the formula remained unchanged as producers Chet Atkins and Felton Jarvis continued applying the Nashville formula to Nelson's recordings, much against the singer's better judgement. As Patoski states, "His next two albums, Laying My Burdens Down and Willie Nelson and Family, were familiar stories: a new cast of studio players...good cover songs...interesting concepts...and lousy sales. AllMusic's Jim Worbois agrees, contending, "There are some nice things on here, but too many are buried under the Nashville Sound and don't seem to be able to stand on their own." Despite the paltry sales, Nelson remained loyal to RCA head Atkins, later stating, "Even though his vision and mine were different, I couldn't get mad at a man who believed so deeply in my talent – especially when that man happened to be one of the best guitarists in the world."

== Reception ==
Professional ratings
Review scores
Source	Rating
AllMusic	3/5 stars

AllMusic: "This is what can best be described as a pleasant album...Not great, but you could do worse."

== Track listing ==
All tracks composed by Willie Nelson, except where noted.

1. "Laying My Burdens Down" - 2:36
2. "How Long Have You Been There" - 2:32 (Dee Moeller)
3. "Senses" - 2:13 (Glen Campbell, Jeannie Seely)
4. "I Don't Feel Anything" - 2:29
5. "I've Seen That Look on Me (A Thousand Times)" - 2:28 (Harlan Howard, Shirl Milete)
6. "Where Do You Stand?" - 2:16
7. "Minstrel Man" - 2:27 (Stan Haas, Edger Ruger)
8. "Happiness Lives Next Door" - 2:37
9. "When We Live Again" - 2:15
10. "Following Me Around" - 2:42

== Personnel ==
- Willie Nelson – vocals, guitar
- Al Pachucki – recording engineer
- Mike Shockley – recording technician
- Roy Shockley – recording technician
- Jimmy Moore – photography
- New World Photography – photography
