= Both Sides Now (Willie Nelson album) =

Studio album by Willie Nelson
- Released: March 1970
- Recorded: November 1969
- Studios: RCA Studio B (Nashville, Tennessee)
- Genre: Country
- Length: 31:16
- Label: RCA Victor
- Producer: Felton Jarvis

Willie Nelson chronology
My Own Peculiar Way (1969)	Both Sides Now (1970)	Laying My Burdens Down (1970)

Both Sides Now is the tenth studio album by country singer Willie Nelson, released in 1970.

== Background ==
With the dawn of the new decade, Nelson had not achieved the commercial success at RCA that he had hoped for. He gained a measure of fame writing songs that were hits for Faron Young ("Hello Walls"), Billy Walker ("Funny How Time Slips Away"), Patsy Cline ("Crazy"), and Roy Orbison ("Pretty Paper"), but most of his singles stalled on the charts, his biggest single at RCA being the Vegas-styled cover "Bring Me Sunshine," which hit number 13. His producer, RCA head Chet Atkins, had tried various approaches, from a live LP to a Texas-themed concept album, but success remained elusive. After the underwhelming performance of the album My Own Peculiar Way, a year passed before the November 1969 sessions began for Both Sides Now.

== Recording and composition ==
As he had in the past, Atkins turned production duties on Nelson over to Felton Jarvis, who had started producing Elvis Presley. Unlike Atkins, Jarvis let Nelson record on his own terms and bring along Billy English, Paul English's nineteen-year-old brother, on drums, David Zettner on guitar and bass, Shirley Nelson on vocals (her last collaboration with her husband), and Jimmy Day on bass. The album contains a new version of "I Gotta Get Drunk," a song Nelson wrote in Houston before moving to Nashville in 1960, as well as "Bloody Mary Morning," a tune destined to become a highlight in the Texan's live shows. In his 2015 autobiography, Nelson admitted the song was taken from his own unhappy experiences as a drinker:

"Bloody Mary Morning" was another boozy song about this boozy period of my life. Its origins might be found in those days on the road when I was living a double life...I was a lousy drunk, a foolish drunk, a fighting drunk, a drunk who did himself much damage. But I was caught up in the culture of drinking. That's what country singers did, right? That's what pickers did. That was the life.

Both Sides Now contains the country standards "Wabash Cannonball" and "Crazy Arms," but what is most striking about the collection is the inclusion of material far beyond the confines of Nashville, as Streissguth notes: "Willie's own songs were as pleasing as ever, at home in a coffeehouse or a honky-tonk, but now they appeared next to his covers of other great songs of the day: Joni Mitchell's 'Both Sides Now,' Fred Neil's 'Everybody's Talkin','...a perfect alignment of stars in early 1970s Nashville: the seasoned singer and the blossoming songwriters shone brightly." Nelson's broad range and musical tastes, already evident in his Django Reinhardt-inspired guitar playing and jazz-inflected singing, were attuned to the new songwriters of the day, with the singer later commenting, "Well, I did sing Joni Mitchell's 'Both Sides Now' and...James Taylor's 'Fire and Rain,' not because I wanted to reinvent myself in the folk medium, but only because I really liked the songs." Going completely against the grain of country music's traditionally right-wing conservative stance, he also identified with the hippie culture: "I liked that they put flowers in their hair and wore bright tie-dyed blouses and bell-bottomed pants. I liked that they had the courage to look and act any damn way they pleased." Nelson sounded just as at ease singing folk-rock as he did singing ballads and western swing, with Jim Worbois of AllMusic declaring, "Listening to "Everybody's Talkin'," you don't find yourself longing for Nilsson’s version." Session player Norbert Putnam led one session and added bass while James Isbell played bongos to convey the folkie vibe Nelson was going after.

== Reception ==
Professional ratings
Review scores
Source	Rating
AllMusic	3/5 stars

AllMusic: "The title track aside, this is a pretty good album. While there aren't as many originals on this record as some of his albums released around this time, he manages to get something new out of several of his covers."

== Track listing ==
1. "Crazy Arms" (Ralph Mooney, Charles Seals)
2. "Wabash Cannonball" (A.P. Carter)
3. "Pins and Needles (In My Heart)" (Nelson, Floyd Jenkins)
4. "Who Do I Know in Dallas" (Nelson, Hank Cochran)
5. "I Gotta Get Drunk" (Nelson)
6. "Once More with Feeling" (Shirley Nelson)
7. "Both Sides Now" (Joni Mitchell)
8. "Bloody Mary Morning" (Nelson)
9. "Everybody's Talkin'" (Fred Neil)
10. "One Has My Name (The Other Has My Heart)" (Hal Blair, Dearest Dean)
11. "It Could Be Said That Way" (Nelson)

== Personnel ==
- Willie Nelson – guitar, vocals
- David Zettner – guitar
- Jimmy Day – steel guitar
- Norbert Putnam – bass
- David English – drums
- James Isbell – percussion

== Bibliography ==
- Nelson, Willie; Ritz, David (2015). It's A Long Story: My Life. Little, Brown and Company. ISBN 9780316339315.
- Patoski, Joe Nick (2008). Willie Nelson: An Epic Life. Hachette Digital. ISBN 978-0-316-01778-7.
- Streissguth, Michael (2013). Outlaw: Waylon, Willie, Kris, and the Renegades of Nashville. HarperCollins. ISBN 978-0062038180.
