= Three Days (Willie Nelson song) =

Single by Faron Young

from the album The Young Approach
- B-side: "Let It Slip Away"
- Released: January 1962
- Genre: Country
- Length: 2:24
- Label: Capitol
- Songwriter: Willie Nelson
- Producer: Ken Nelson

Faron Young singles chronology
| "Backtrack" (1961) | "Three Days" (1962) | "The Comeback" (1962) |

"Three Days"

Single by k.d. lang

from the album Absolute Torch and Twang
- B-side: "Trail of Broken Hearts"
- Released: October 1989
- Genre: Country
- Length: 3:17
- Label: Sire
- Songwriter: Willie Nelson
- Producers: k.d. lang Ben Mink; Greg Penny

K.d. lang singles chronology
| "Full Moon Full of Love" (1989) | "Three Days" (1989) | "Pulling Back the Reins" (1989) |

"Three Days" is a song written by Willie Nelson. It was originally recorded by American country music artist Faron Young on his 1961 album The Young Approach. Young's version was released as a single in January 1962 and peaked at number 7 on the Billboard Hot Country Singles chart.

Nelson recorded his own version of the song on his 1962 debut album, ...And Then I Wrote. He later re-recorded the song for his 1998 album Teatro with backing vocals by Emmylou Harris.

"Three Days" was also recorded by Canadian country music artist k.d. lang on her 1989 album Absolute Torch and Twang. lang's version was released in October 1989 as the album's second single. It peaked at number 9 on the RPM Country Tracks chart in January 1990.

On the 1996 Willie Nelson tribute album, Twisted Willie, the song was performed by L7 with backup vocals by Waylon Jennings.

== Chart performance ==
=== Faron Young ===
| Chart (1962) | Peak position |
|---|---|
| U.S. Billboard Hot Country Singles | 7 |

=== k.d. lang ===
| Chart (1989–1990) | Peak position |
|---|---|
| Canada Country Singles (RPM) | 9 |
| US Hot Country Songs (Billboard) | 55 |
