= ...And Then I Wrote =

Studio album by Willie Nelson
- Released: September 1962
- Recorded: August 22–23; September 11–12, 1962
- Studio: Bradley Studios, Nashville, Tennessee
- Genre: Country
- Length: 30:15
- Label: Liberty
- Producer: Joe Allison

Willie Nelson chronology
...And Then I Wrote (1962)	Here's Willie Nelson (1963)

...And Then I Wrote is the debut studio album by country singer Willie Nelson, recorded during August and September 1962 and released through Liberty Records.

Despite Nelson's fruitless efforts to succeed with his recording releases with D Records, and after trying with other labels as a singer, he sold several of his original written songs to other artists. After his composition "Family Bible" became a hit for Claude Gray in 1960, he moved to Nashville, where he was signed by Pamper Music as a songwriter. Several of his songs became hits for other artists, including Faron Young ("Hello Walls"); Ray Price ("Night Life") and Patsy Cline ("Crazy").

Fueled by the success of his songwriting, he was signed by Liberty Records. During August, Nelson started recording his first album, produced by Joe Allison. The single releases of the album "Touch Me" and "The Part Where I Cry" were recorded on that day in Nashville, Tennessee, while it was completed during September in the recording facilities of the label in Los Angeles, California. The single "Touch Me" became Nelson's second top ten, reaching number 7 on Billboard's Hot Country Singles.

== Background ==
In 1958, Nelson released two records under a contract with Pappy Daily of D Records, "Man With the Blues"/"The Storm Has Just Begun" and "What a Way to Live"/"Misery Mansion". While working for D Records and singing in nightclubs, Nelson was hired by guitar instructor Paul Buskirk to teach in his school. He sold to Buskirk his original songs "Family Bible" for US$50, and "Night Life" for US$150. "Family Bible" turned into a hit for Claude Gray in 1960.

Nelson moved to Nashville in 1960, but no label signed him. Most of his demos were rejected. Nelson was later signed as a songwriter to Pamper Music with the help of Hank Cochran, who worked for the publishing company owned by Ray Price and Hal Smith. Faron Young recorded Nelson's "Hello Walls", and after Ray Price recorded Nelson's "Night Life", and his previous bassist Johnny Paycheck quit, Nelson joined Price's touring band as a bass player. While playing with Price and the Cherokee Cowboys, other of his original songs became hits for other artists, including "Funny How Time Slips Away" (Billy Walker), "Pretty Paper" (Roy Orbison), and, most famously, "Crazy" by Patsy Cline. Nelson signed with Liberty Records and was recording by August 1961 at the Bradley Studios. As Nelson later recalled, Cochran was instrumental in getting him signed: "Hank had convinced Liberty's A&R man for country music, Joe Allison, that I was the next big thing...Allison knew that there wasn't any way I was gonna change my singing style - and that was fine by him. He understood me. He just wanted me to sing my own songs in my own way."

== Recording and composition ==
In his 2015 autobiography, Nelson insists that he composed "Crazy", "Night Life", "Funny How Time Slips Away", "Mr. Record Man", "I Gotta Get Drunk" and "The Party's Over" in one songwriting jag while living in Houston before finally moving to Nashville: "Within an astounding short period of time – a week or two – I'd written a suite of songs that reflected my real-life situation. I knew these songs were damn good, but at the same time, I didn't know what to do with them." Nelson unconsciously borrowed the first few notes of "Crazy" from the Floyd Tillman song "I Gotta Have My Baby Back." "Hello Walls" was written after Nelson had been hired by Pamper Music. Initially collaborating with Hank Cochran, he was nervous at first, realizing "this was creativity on demand," and later recalling:

First few days found me a little uneasy. I had my guitar, a pencil, and a blank notebook. Hank might throw out an idea, hoping it might spark something in me. When that didn't work, he might tell me a joke, or I might tell him one, hoping that joking would lead to some kind of song. It didn't...And one afternoon, after we had just sat around throwing the bull, he said, "I'm going to the office to make a few calls. You work on something by yourself."

By the time Cochran had returned from his phone call Nelson had written "Hello Walls" and sang it for him. "It's worth a fuckin' fortune," Cochran responded, adding, "Willie, my friend, you just wrote a hit."

The recording sessions for his first album release, ...And Then I Wrote, began in the Nashville studios of Liberty Records. Nelson recorded on August 22–23, starting during the night and lasting until the morning of the following day. Dissatisfied with the results, Allison moved the sessions to the studios of the label in Los Angeles, California, where Nelson was joined by three other stellar guitarists - session leader Billy Strange, Roy Nichols from the Maddox Brothers and Rose, and Johnny Western, who had worked with Johnny Cash. During two sessions on September 11–12, Nelson recorded "Crazy", "Darkness on the Face of the Earth", "Three Days", "Funny How Times Slips Away", "Mr. Record Man" and "Hello Walls". B. J. Baker led the vocal chorus that attempted to back Nelson, but the singer's idiosyncratic style gave them problems, as recounted by Nelson biographer Joe Nick Patoski: "The singers got lost trying to follow Willie's lead vocals until Joe Allison put up some baffles between Willie and the singers so they couldn't hear one another. To stay on the beat, the singers followed Johnny Western's direction." The liner notes of the album were written by local DJ Charlie Williams, by request of Allison. The album's biggest hit was "Touch Me," a sad blues done in a slow drag with the rough edges smoothed out by harmony singers and a cool instrumental arrangement that reached the Top 10 and earned Nelson a place on jukeboxes throughout the United States.

It was during the recording of "Mr. Record Man" that Nelson met his second wife Shirley Collie, with whom he would soon record the duet "Willingly", a Cochran composition.

== Release ==
Professional ratings
Review scores
Source	Rating
AllMusic	4/5 stars

The record was released in September 1962. "Touch Me" was released as a single, becoming Nelson's second top ten single, reaching No. 7 on Billboard's Hot Country Singles chart. Billboard wrote a review about the single, describing it as an "interesting country-styled tune" with "good" lyrics. AllMusic rated the album with four stars out of five.

== Track listing ==
All tracks are written by Willie Nelson, except where noted.

Side one
No.	Title	Length
1.	"Touch Me"	2:12
2.	"Wake Me When It's Over"	2:48
3.	"Hello Walls"	2:23
4.	"Funny How Time Slips Away"	3:02
5.	"Crazy"	2:50
6.	"The Part Where I Cry"	2:18

Side two
No.	Title	Writer(s)	Length
1.	"Mr. Record Man"		2:10
2.	"Three Days"		2:33
3.	"One Step Beyond"		2:20
4.	"Undo the Right"	Hank Cochran, Nelson	2:56
5.	"Darkness on the Face of the Earth"		2:19
6.	"Where My House Lives"		2:24

== Personnel ==
- Willie Nelson – lead vocals, acoustic guitar
- Billy Strange – guitar
- Roy Nichols – guitar
- Johnny Western – guitar
- Earl Palmer – drums
- B. J. Baker – backing vocals

Technical

- Joe Allison – producer
- Ralph Valentine – engineer
- Selby Coffeen – engineer
- Charlie Williams – liner notes
- Murray Garrett – photography
- Gene Howard – photography

== Charts ==
Year	Song	Chart	Peak position
1962	"Touch Me"	Billboard Hot Country Singles	7

== Sources ==
- Billboard staff (1962). "Singles Reviews". Billboard. Vol. 74, no. 16. Nielsen Business Media, Inc. p. 29. ISSN 0006-2510.
- Erlewine, Michael (1997). All Music Guide to Country: The Experts' Guide to the Best Recordings in Country Music. Miller Freeman. ISBN 978-0-87930-475-1.
- Kosser, Michael (2006). How Nashville Became Music City, U.s.a.: 50 Years of Music Row. Hal Leonard Corporation. ISBN 9780634098062.
- Nelson, Willie; Ritz, David (2015). It's a Long Story: My Life. Little, Brown and Company.
- Nelson, Willie; Shrake, Bud; Shrake, Edwin (2000). Willie: An Autobiography. Cooper Square Press.
- Patoski, Joe Nick (2008). Willie Nelson: An Epic Life. Hachette Digital. ISBN 978-0-316-01778-7.
- Thompson, Graeme (2012). Willie Nelson: The Outlaw. Random House. ISBN 9781448133413.
