= The Electric Horseman (album) =

1979 soundtrack album by Willie Nelson

The Electric Horseman: Music from the Original Motion Picture Soundtrack

Soundtrack album by Willie Nelson
- Released: December 1979
- Recorded: 1979
- Genre: Country
- Length: 33:30
- Label: Columbia Records
- Producers: Dave Grusin; Larry Rosen; Willie Nelson; Sydney Pollack

Willie Nelson chronology
Pretty Paper (1979)	The Electric Horseman: Music from the Original Motion Picture Soundtrack (1979)	San Antonio Rose (1980)

Singles from The Electric Horseman: Music from the Original Motion Picture Soundtrack
- 1. "My Heroes Have Always Been Cowboys" Released: January 1980

The Electric Horseman: Music from the Original Motion Picture Soundtrack is the soundtrack to the Sydney Pollack film The Electric Horseman.

== Track listing ==
=== Side one ===
Songs by Willie Nelson

1. "Midnight Rider" – 2:51
2. "My Heroes Have Always Been Cowboys" – 3:05
3. "Mammas Don't Let Your Babies Grow Up to Be Cowboys" – 3:28
4. "So You Think You're a Cowboy" – 2:19
5. "Hands on the Wheel" – 2:50

=== Side two ===
Film score by Dave Grusin

1. "Electro-Phantasma" – 5:00
2. "Rising Star (Love Theme)" – 2:36
3. "The Electric Horseman" – 3:41
4. "Interlude-Tumbleweed Morning" – 0:29
5. "Disco Magic" – 5:03
6. "Freedom Epilogue" – 2:11

== Personnel ==
- Willie Nelson – Guitar, vocals, performer
- Dave Grusin – Performer

== Chart performance ==
Chart (1979)	Peak position
US Billboard 200	52
US Top Country Albums (Billboard)	3
