= Teatro (Willie Nelson album) =

Studio album by Willie Nelson
- Released: September 1, 1998
- Genre: Alternative country, country
- Length: 50:30
- Label: Island
- Producer: Daniel Lanois

Willie Nelson chronology
Hill Country Christmas (1997)	Teatro (1998)	Night and Day (1999)

Professional ratings
Review scores
Source	Rating
AllMusic	4.5/5 stars
Entertainment Weekly	B+
The Guardian	2/5 stars
Rolling Stone	3/5 stars

Teatro is the 45th studio album by Willie Nelson, released in September 1998 via Island Records. Filmmaker Wim Wenders directed Willie Nelson at the Teatro, a feature-length documentary film of the recording sessions with live performances.

== Background ==
The recording sessions for the album were held in the old movie theater named Teatro in Oxnard, California and were produced by Daniel Lanois. The album features backing vocals by Emmylou Harris, as well as backing by Willie Nelson regular harmonicist Mickey Raphael and Nelson's sister, Bobbie Nelson, on piano. The majority of the songs are composed by Nelson, and most are re-recordings of songs he wrote and first recorded in the 1960s: "Darkness on the Face of the Earth" (1961), "My Own Peculiar Way" (1964), "Home Motel" (1962), "I Just Can't Let You Say Goodbye" (1968), "I've Just Destroyed the World (1962) and "Three Days" (1962).

Lanois contributes one of his songs, "The Maker" (originally released on his album Acadie), and plays electric guitar and bass, and also took the photograph for the album cover. Mark Howard recorded and mixed the record.

Teatro is noted for its spare, yet drum-heavy and atmospheric sound, credited to Lanois, who had also produced Harris's alternative country album, Wrecking Ball.

The album was reissued in 2017 by Light in the Attic Records with seven bonus tracks and a DVD of the documentary by Wim Wenders.

== Track listing ==
All songs written by Willie Nelson, except where noted.

1. "Ou Es-Tu, Mon Amour? (Where Are You, My Love?)" (Emile Stehn, Henri LeMarchand) – 2:43
2. "I Never Cared For You" – 2:18
3. "Everywhere I Go" – 3:50
4. "Darkness on the Face of the Earth" – 2:33
5. "My Own Peculiar Way" – 3:37
6. "These Lonely Nights" (Chester Odom) – 3:29
7. "Home Motel" – 3:15
8. "The Maker" (Daniel Lanois) – 5:08
9. "I Just Can't Let You Say Goodbye" – 4:38
10. "I've Just Destroyed the World (I'm Living In)" (Nelson, Ray Price) – 2:52
11. "Somebody Pick Up My Pieces" – 4:39
12. "Three Days" – 3:07
13. "I've Loved You All Over the World" – 4:18
14. "Annie" – 3:51
15. (bonus) "It Should Be Easier Now" – 3:15
16. (bonus) "One Step Beyond" – 3:38
17. (bonus) "Send Me the Pillow That You Dream On" (Hank Locklin) – 3:09
18. (bonus) "Have I Told You Lately That I Love You" (Scotty Wiseman) – 3:39
19. (bonus) "Till I Gain Control Again" (Rodney Crowell) – 6:17
20. (bonus) "Lonely Little Mansion" – 4:03
21. (bonus) "Things To Remember" – 2:50

== Personnel ==
- Willie Nelson – vocals, acoustic guitar, electric guitar
- Emmylou Harris – background vocals on all tracks except 1, 6, 7 & 14
- Daniel Lanois – producer, gibson les paul, bass guitar
- Tony Mangurian – drums, percussion
- Victor Indrizzo – drums, percussion
- Bobbie Nelson – wurlitzer electric piano, organ
- Brian Griffiths – guitars, slide guitar, mandolin
- Mickey Raphael – harmonica, bass harmonica
- Brad Mehldau – vibraphone, piano
- Malcolm Burn – organ
- Jeffrey Green – drums, omnichord, keyboard
- Cyril Neville – congas

== Chart performance ==
Chart (1998)	Peak position
Australian Albums (ARIA)	127
U.S. Billboard Top Country Albums	17
U.S. Billboard 200	104
Canadian RPM Country Albums	15

== See also ==
- The Monsanto Years – a 2015 Neil Young album featuring Nelson's sons and also recorded at the Teatro theater
