= Country Music Concert =

Live album by Willie Nelson
- Released: 1966
- Recorded: 1966
- Venue: Panther Hall
- Genre: Country
- Length: 34:38
- Label: RCA
- Producer: Felton Jarvis

Willie Nelson chronology
Country Music Concert (1966)	Willie Nelson Live (1976)

Country Music Concert is a 1966 live album by country singer Willie Nelson.

== Recording ==
The album was recorded live at Panther Hall in Fort Worth over two nights in July 1966 with Nelson backed by Johnny Bush on drums and Wade Ray on bass, although producer Felton Jarvis had Chip Young overdub guitar parts and steel guitar fills in RCA’s Nashville studio. Despite the low sales of his tepid RCA albums, which were given the Nashville Sound treatment, Nelson enjoyed a loyal fan following in his home state of Texas largely on the basis of his freewheeling live shows. Like his friend and future fellow outlaw Waylon Jennings, Nelson was covering the Beatles during this period, and Country Music Concert contains his version of "Yesterday". During the introduction Nelson jokes:

“I’d like to do a song now that, uh, that was recorded by, uh, a pretty fair little country group known as The Beatles (audience laughter), I know you’re familiar with those – you’ve heard them many times on the Grand Ole Opry. (laughs) Seriously, this is a song that, as a songwriter myself, I appreciate it very much because I think it’s a very great piece of material, and I’d like to do it for you and I hope you enjoy it.

The album also includes the chilling “I Just Can’t Let You Say Goodbye,” one of the most violent songs Nelson ever penned. According to biographer Joe Nick Patoski:

One in particular, “I Just Can’t Say Goodbye,” bordered on psycho-creepy. Willie had read about a crime of passion in the newspaper and used his imagination to take it one step further. Delivered in an up-tempo Latin rhythm, it was told from the perspective of a man so distraught over his breakup and so upset by the bad things his lover is saying to him that he gets pissed off and strangles her to death.

Nelson would grow increasingly irritated with RCA's policy of only allowing Nashville studio musicians to play on recording sessions. He later recalled, "The music I played on the road, the music I’d cultivated with my band, had vitality. It was live music played for live people. I knew how to entertain a crowd for two, three, even four hours at a stretch...They lived in the now...Onstage, I was in charge. But in the studio, I wasn’t in charge and consequently the now escaped me.

In 1976, RCA reissued this album as Willie Nelson Live. The reissue left off "Night Life", but added "I Gotta Get Drunk", a studio recording made three years after the release of this album. The song was remixed to include audience sounds not present on the original recording. In 1998, Bear Family Records reissued "Country Music Concert" in its original format (as part of the "Nashville Was The Roughest..." box set), along with three bonus tracks not on the original release: "I Love You Because", a jazzy take on Hank Williams' "There'll Be No Teardrops Tonight", and "I'm Still Not Over You"

== Reception ==
Jim Worbois of AllMusic states, “This is an interesting album chronicling an early show by Nelson. From time to time, the audience will shout song titles, and he actually talks between songs. While many people don't like live albums, this is actually more fun than some of his later live records.”

== Track listing ==
All tracks written by Willie Nelson, except where noted.

Side one
No.	Title	Writer(s)	Length
1.	"Introduction: Bo Powell; Willie Introduces Band; Mr. Record Man/Hello Walls/One Day At a Time" (medley)		5:07
2.	"The Last Letter/Half a Man" (medley)	Rex Griffin; Nelson	4:20
3.	"I Never Cared for You"		2:20
4.	"Yesterday"	John Lennon; Paul McCartney	2:13
5.	"Touch Me"		2:04

Side two
No.	Title	Writer(s)	Length
1.	"Something To Think About"		2:13
2.	"I Just Can't Let You Say Goodbye"		2:33
3.	"How Long Is Forever"		2:36
4.	"Night Life"	Nelson; Paul Buskirk; Walter Breeland	4:21
5.	"Opportunity to Cry/Permanently Lonely" (medley)		4:26
6.	"My Own Peculiar Way"		2:25

== Personnel ==
- Willie Nelson - Guitar, vocals.
- Johnny Bush - Drums
- Wade Ray - Bass guitar

== Bibliography ==
- Nelson, Willie; Ritz, David (2015). It's A Long Story: My Life. Little, Brown and Company. ISBN 9780316339315.
- Patoski, Joe Nick (2008). Willie Nelson: An Epic Life. Hachette Digital. ISBN 978-0-316-01778-7.
