= Shirley Collie Nelson =

American singer-songwriter (1931–2010)

Background information
- Also known as: Shirley Caddell (1955–1958); Shirley Collie (1959–1963)
- Born: Shirley Angelina Simpson; March 16, 1931; Chillicothe, Missouri, U.S.
- Died: January 27, 2010 (aged 78) Springfield, Missouri, U.S.
- Genres: Country, rockabilly
- Occupations: Singer, songwriter
- Instruments: Vocals, guitar, bass
- Years active: 1945–1995
- Labels: ABC-Paramount, Columbia, Liberty
- Formerly of: Willie Nelson, Warren Smith, Floyd Tillman, Bob Wills, Lefty Frizzell, Clyde Beavers
- Spouse: Willie Nelson (m. 1963; div. 1971)

Shirley Collie Nelson (born Shirley Angelina Simpson; March 16, 1931 – January 27, 2010) was an American country music and rockabilly singer, yodeler, guitarist and songwriter. She was the second wife of country star Willie Nelson, married to him between 1963 and 1971.

== Life and career ==
Born in Chillicothe, Missouri, to Alice (née Davis) and Henry Simpson, she sang at local war bond rallies during World War II as a child, and made a guest appearance on KFEQ-AM in St. Joseph, Missouri. In 1945, at age 14, Simpson replaced "Sue" on the weekday morning Millie and Sue show on KMBC-AM in Kansas City, and the duo also appeared on the station's Brush Creek Follies barn dance show. She bought her Little Martin guitar from the previous Sue, an instrument she would use for the rest of her career. Her first marriage, at 15, lasted until she was 19.

In 1950, Simpson moved to Texas to play with Bob Wills, Johnnie Lee Wills and other Texas bands. She settled in Corpus Christi and performed locally until the fall of 1955, when the redhead was offered a regular role on ABC-TV's Ozark Jubilee in Springfield, Missouri and signed a recording contract with ABC-Paramount. In 1956, she released her first singles on the label under her Jubilee stage name, Shirley Caddell, and made a guest appearance on The Eddy Arnold Show. In 1957, she recorded two singles with Lefty Frizzell on Columbia Records, as well as two solo numbers.

In 1958, she left Springfield to tour with The Philip Morris Country Music Show based in Nashville, Tennessee, where she met the show's manager and emcee, Hiram "Biff" Collie, a country music disc jockey on KFOX-AM in Long Beach, California. They married and she moved to Hollywood, appearing on Country America on KABC-TV. Both were also regulars on KTTV-TV's Town Hall Party, and Collie was a guest on NBC-TV's You Bet Your Life in 1960.

Starting in 1960, Collie released singles on the Liberty Records label with Floyd Tillman, Bob Wills and The Texas Playboys, and Clyde Beavers. In 1961, she made her chart debut with the Harlan Howard song "Dime a Dozen," which rose to No. 25 on the Billboard country chart. That same year, "Why Baby Why", her duet with Warren Smith, reached No. 23. Soon record producer Joe Allison approached her to sing with Willie Nelson, who previous singers had been unable to sing harmony with due to his style. Their 1962 duet, "Willingly", climbed to No. 10 and was his first chart hit, but it failed to establish him as a star.

In 1962, Collie was offered the role of semi-regular character Pearl Bodine on the CBS-TV series The Beverly Hillbillies, but instead began touring with Nelson, playing bass guitar in his band. They married in Las Vegas in 1963. As Nelson's career flourished, he talked her into staying home in Ridgetop outside Nashville, where she helped raise his three children by his first wife, Martha. The couple co-wrote his 1968 single "Little Things", and she is credited with writing his singles "I Hope So" (1969) and "Once More With Feeling" (1970).

After she discovered Nelson had fathered a daughter with Connie Koepke, who would become his third wife, their marriage fell apart and they divorced in 1971. In the years following, however, she would perform and yodel with Nelson when he toured in Missouri until she retired; and the two collaborated on her 2009 book, Memoir: Scrapbooks in My Mind: Featuring Shirley and Willie Nelson and Many Others.

From 1987–89, Nelson worked for the state of Missouri with the mentally disabled. She continued to perform in Branson, Missouri and received a lifetime achievement award from KMBZ in 1996.

Nelson died in Springfield, Missouri on January 27, 2010, aged 78, following a long illness, and was buried at White Chapel Memorial Gardens in Springfield.

== Discography ==
=== Albums ===
Title	Details	Peak positions
Title	Details	US Country
Willie Nelson and Friends (with Willie Nelson, Asleep at the Wheel and Tanya Tucker)	Release date: 2015; Label: Cracker Barrel	39

=== Singles ===
Year	Single	US Country
1956	"I Think You're Lying"	—
1956	"Where Did the Sunshine Go?"	—
1957	"Oh Yes Darling!"	—
1957	"Part-Time Gal"	—
1957	"No One to Talk To" (with Lefty Frizzell)	—
1957	"Is it Only that You're Lonely" (with Lefty Frizzell)	—
1960	"Here I Am, Drunk Again! (with Clyde Beavers)	—
1960	"Sad Singin' and Slow Ridin'"	—
1960	"I'd Rather Hear Lies"	—
1960	"My Charlie"	—
1960	"Didn't Work Out, Did It?"	—
1961	"Dime a Dozen"	25
1961	"Why Baby Why" (with Warren Smith)	23
1961	"Why I'm Walking" (with Warren Smith)	—
1961	"Keeping My Fingers Crossed"	—
1961	"If I Live Long Enough"	—
1961	"Oh You Darling"	—
1962	"Willingly" (with Willie Nelson)	10
1962	"Chain of Love" (with Willie Nelson)	—
1962	"You Dream About Me" (with Willie Nelson)	—
1962	"Is this My Destiny"	—
1962	"We're Going Bad Together"	—
1962	"No Wonder I Sing"	—
