= Sings Kristofferson =

Studio album by Willie Nelson
- Released: October 1979
- Genre: Country
- Length: 42:26
- Label: Columbia
- Producer: Willie Nelson

Willie Nelson chronology
Stardust (1978)	Sings Kristofferson (1979)	Pretty Paper (1979)

Professional ratings
Review scores
Source	Rating
AllMusic	4/5 stars
Christgau's Record Guide	B−
The Rolling Stone Album Guide	3/5 stars

Sings Kristofferson is the twenty-third studio album recorded by Willie Nelson in 1979 consisting of covers of Kris Kristofferson songs. It reached No. 5 on the US Country albums chart, No. 42 on the US Pop albums charts, and was certified gold in Canada and platinum in the US.

== Track listing ==
All tracks composed by Kris Kristofferson; except Track 1 where it was composed by Fred Foster, Kristofferson

No.	Title	Length
1.	"Me and Bobby McGee"	5:40
2.	"Help Me Make It Through the Night"	3:57
3.	"The Pilgrim, Chapter 33"	3:33
4.	"Why Me"	3:52
5.	"For the Good Times"	5:24
6.	"You Show Me Yours (And I'll Show You Mine)"	3:54
7.	"Lovin' Her Was Easier (Than Anything I'll Ever Do Again)"	5:50
8.	"Sunday Mornin' Comin' Down"	7:02
9.	"Please Don't Tell Me How the Story Ends"	2:48
Total length:		42:26

== Personnel ==
- Willie Nelson – lead vocals, guitar
- Jody Payne – guitar
- Bobbie Nelson – piano
- Rex Ludwick – drums
- Paul English – drums
- Bee Spears – bass guitar
- Chris Ethridge – bass guitar
- Mickey Raphael – harmonica
- Jerry Reed – electric guitar on "You Show Me Yours"
- Grady Martin – electric guitar on You Show Me Yours," "Sunday Mornin' Comin' Down"
- Albert Lee – electric guitar on "The Pilgrim"
- Booker T. Jones – organ on "Why Me"
- Kris Kristofferson – backing vocals

Technical

- Bradley Hartman, Harold Lee – engineer
- Norman Seeff – photography

== Charts ==
=== Weekly charts ===
Chart (1979)	Peak position
Canadian Albums (RPM)	64
Canadian Country Albums (RPM)	1
US Billboard 200	42
US Top Country Albums (Billboard)	5

=== Year-end charts ===
Chart (1980)	Position
US Top Country Albums (Billboard)	23
