= Pretty Paper (song) =

Original song written and composed by Willie Nelson

Single by Roy Orbison
- B-side: "Almost"
- Released: November 15, 1963
- Recorded: September 11, 1963
- Studio: Decca Studios, London
- Genre: Christmas; country
- Length: 2:41
- Label: Monument
- Songwriter(s): Willie Nelson
- Producer(s): Fred Foster

Roy Orbison singles chronology
"Mean Woman Blues" (1963)	"Pretty Paper" (1963)	"Beautiful Dreamer" (1963)

"Pretty Paper" is a song written by country music singer-songwriter Willie Nelson in 1963. After being signed to Monument Records, Nelson played the song for producer Fred Foster. Foster pitched the song to Roy Orbison, who turned it into a hit. Nelson later recorded his own version of the song in November 1964.

== Content ==
The song tells the story of a street vendor who, during the Christmas season, sells pencils and paper on the streets. In October 1963, while walking in his farm in Ridgetop, Tennessee, Nelson was inspired to write the song after he remembered a man he often saw while he lived in Fort Worth, Texas. The man moved with rollers, selling paper and pencils in front of Leonard's Department Store. In 2013, the Fort Worth Star-Telegram identified the man as Frankie Brierton, of Santo, Texas. Both of Brierton's legs were atrophied below the knee due to childhood meningitis.

== Background and recording ==
Early in 1963, Nelson was signed by Fred Foster to the label Monument Records. In October 1963, Nelson sang "Pretty Paper" for Foster, who was impressed and decided to forward the song to Roy Orbison in London. Bill Justis worked the arrangements and the demo tape was sent to Orbison in England. According to the official Roy Orbison biography, The Authorized Roy Orbison, "Pretty Paper" was recorded at Decca Studio 2 in London with music director Ivor Raymonde, who made last-minute arrangements with his orchestra. Each musician was provided with microphones newly designed by Decca Records' engineers. The microphones were worn around the neck to amplify the strings. Orbison attended the session with a 102-degree fever. According to the biography, Orbison recorded the song in 12 takes. The B-side, "Almost," was also done that day.

== Release ==
The record by Orbison was released in November 1963. The song peaked at number 10 on Billboard's Adult Contemporary Chart, 15 on the Billboard Hot 100 and 27 on the Christmas Singles Chart. The record was released in the UK in November 1964 and peaked at number 6 on the UK Singles Chart. The song was included on More of Roy Orbison's Greatest Hits in 1964, and has appeared on numerous compilations through the years.

== Other recordings ==
After moving to RCA Records in November 1964, Willie Nelson recorded his own version, produced by Chet Atkins. The musicians for the session were Hargus "Pig" Robbins (piano), Pete Drake (pedal steel), Henry Strzelecki (bass), Kenneth Buttrey (drums), Jerry Reed (guitar) and Velma Smith (guitar). Nelson recorded for the B-side "What a Merry Christmas This Could Be". Nelson returned to the studio in December and recorded with the melody of the song in phonetic German the song "Little Darling". Nelson re-recorded the song for his 1979 album Pretty Paper, and once more with his sister Bobbie Nelson for their 1997 album Hill Country Christmas.

There have been numerous cover versions of the song, by artists including Glen Campbell (1968), Mickey Gilley (1976), Randy Travis (1986), Don McLean (1991), Asleep at the Wheel (1997), Kenny Chesney (2003), Chris Isaak (2004), Reverend Horton Heat (2005), Emmy Rossum (2013), The Lumineers (2018), Dolly Parton (2020), Eilen Jewell (2021) and dozens of others.
