= Joe Allison =

American songwriter, radio and television personality, record producer and businessman

Joe Marion Allison
- Also known as: Uncle Joe; Jamboree Joe
- Born: Joe Marion Allison; October 3, 1924; McKinney, Texas, United States
- Died: August 2, 2002 (aged 77) Nashville, Tennessee, United States
- Genres: Country music
- Occupations: Songwriter; Disc jockey Radio announcer Record producer Business executive

Joe Marion Allison (October 3, 1924 – August 2, 2002) was an American songwriter, radio and television personality, record producer, and country music business executive. Allison won five BMI performance awards for hit singles he wrote and a 2 million performance award for writing "He'll Have to Go". He co-founded the Country Music Association. CMT called him "one of the most influential figures in the rise of modern country music."

== Early life ==
Joe Allison was born in McKinney, Texas in 1924. He attended East Van Zandt elementary school in Fort Worth, Texas, followed by McKinney Texas Junior High and high school in Denison, Texas. He graduated high school in 1939 and attended junior college in Tishomingo, Oklahoma.

== Career ==
Allison got his start in the music industry as a music radio announcer for KPLT in Paris, Texas. In 1944, he worked at KMAC in San Antonio, Texas. He became an associate of Tex Ritter's, serving as emcee for Ritter's Canadian and American tour in 1945. The next year, he wrote "When You Leave, Don't Slam the Door" for Ritter, which became Allison's first number one hit. In 1949, Allison moved to Nashville, where he worked for WMAK. By that time, he had already appeared on the Grand Ole Opry.

In 1953, he got a job with KXLA in Pasadena, California, taking over for Tennessee Ernie Ford. That same year, he co-founded the Country Music Disc Jockeys Association. He traveled between Nashville and Pasadena, writing songs and working on radio and television. In Nashville, he appeared regularly at WSM and WSIX. He wrote two hit singles during this decade: "Live Fast, Love Hard, Die Young" by Faron Young (1955) and "Teen-Age Crush" by Tommy Sands (1957), the latter cowritten with Joe's wife Audrey Allison. In 1957, he worked in Hollywood, where he hosted Country America, a county-pop music show on ABC.

Allison worked in radio and transitioned into music labels in the 1960s, while still writing songs. He started the decade off in 1960 with a job at KFOX in Long Beach, California while starting the country music department at Liberty Records. One of his first artists at Liberty was Willie Nelson. At Liberty, he also worked with Hank Cochran and is credited with Bob Wills' comeback. That same year, he wrote Jim Reeves' hit "He'll Have to Go" with his wife Audrey. They also wrote the answer song "He'll Have to Stay" with Charles Grean, which was a hit that same year for Jeanne Black. In 1961, he started working at Central Songs, a publishing house based in Los Angeles. He also hosted a radio show on the Armed Forces Radio Network, which would be the longest running show on the network, and promoted the Country Music Association (CMA), which he helped found. He was awarded the CMA's Founding President's Award for his work in 1964. He moved back to Nashville in the last half of the decade, where he managed the country department at Dot Records. He independently produced "The Tip of My Fingers" and "Yesterday When I Was Young" by Roy Clark.

In the 1970s he was head of Paramount Music and Capitol Records' country divisions. At Paramount, he signed Joe Stampley and Tommy Overstreet. At Capitol, he worked with Red Steagall and produced Tex Ritter's final album. He was awarded the Jim Reeves Award in 1970. In 1976, he was inducted into the Disc Jockey Hall of Fame and two years later, the Nashville Songwriters Hall of Fame.

== Later life and legacy ==
Allison retired from the music industry in the late 1970s. He sold antiques and fine art until 1988, when he had a heart attack, and continued to serve on the board of various organizations in his later life. He died in Nashville of lung disease in 2002 and his remains were interred in the Woodlawn Memorial Park.

Joe Allison is an inductee in the Country Music Hall of Fame.
