= Funny How Time Slips Away =

1961 song by Willie Nelson

Single by Billy Walker

from the album Greatest Hits
- B-side: "Joey's Back in Town"
- Released: June 23, 1961
- Recorded: April 21, 1961
- Genre: Country
- Length: 2:51
- Label: Columbia
- Songwriter: Willie Nelson

Billy Walker singles chronology
"I Wish You Love" (1960)	"Funny How Time Slips Away" (1961)	"(I'd Like to Be In) Charlie's Shoes" (1962)

"Funny"

Single by Joe Hinton

from the album Funny (How the Time Slips Away)
- B-side: "You Gotta Have Love"
- Released: June 1964
- Recorded: 1964
- Genre: R&B
- Length: 3:00
- Label: Back Beat
- Songwriter: Willie Nelson

"Funny How Time Slips Away" is a song written by Willie Nelson and first recorded by country singer Billy Walker. Walker's version was issued as a single by Columbia Records in June 1961 and peaked at number 23 on the Hot C&W Sides chart before being included on his 1963 Greatest Hits album. Willie Nelson released his own recording of his song on his 1965 album Country Willie: His Own Songs.

== Notable cover versions ==
- 1961 – Jimmy Elledge released a version as a single on RCA Victor, peaking at number 22 on the Billboard Hot 100. His version, which was recorded on September 7, 1961, sold more than one million copies.
- 1963 – Johnny Tillotson released a version as a single on Cadence from his album It Keeps Right On a-Hurtin', peaking at number 50 on the Billboard Hot 100.
- 1964 – Joe Hinton had a major crossover hit with his version from his album Funny (How the Time Slips Away), which went to number 1 on the Cash Box R&B chart, number 13 on the Billboard Hot 100, and number 14 in Canada.
- 1966 – Georgie Fame recorded a version for his album Sound Venture. The record peaked at number 9 on the UK Albums Chart.
- 1968 – Tom Jones released a version from his album The Tom Jones Fever Zone in 1968.
- 1973 – Al Green released a version on his Call Me album, which reached number 10 on the Billboard 200 pop albums chart and number 1 on the Black albums chart.
- 1974 - Bryan Ferry recorded a version for his album Another Time, Another Place which reached number 4 in the UK Albums Chart.
- 1975 – Narvel Felts released a version from his album Narvel Felts that peaked at number 12 on the Hot Country Singles chart.
- 1976 – Dorothy Moore released a version from her album Misty Blue that reached number 7 on the soul chart and number 57 on the Hot 100.
- 1982 – The Spinners recorded a version on their album Grand Slam that peaked at number 43 on the soul chart and number 67 on the Hot 100.
- 1994 – Al Green and Lyle Lovett released a version on the compilation album Rhythm, Country and Blues. Green won his ninth Grammy Award for this version in the category of Best Pop Collaboration with Vocals at the 37th Annual Grammy Awards.
- 2017 – A duet version between Willie Nelson and Glen Campbell appeared on Campbell's final album, Adiós, and won both artists the 2017 CMA Award for Musical Event of the Year at the 51st Annual Country Music Association Awards.
