= List of awards and nominations received by Willie Nelson =

Willie Nelson awards and nominations
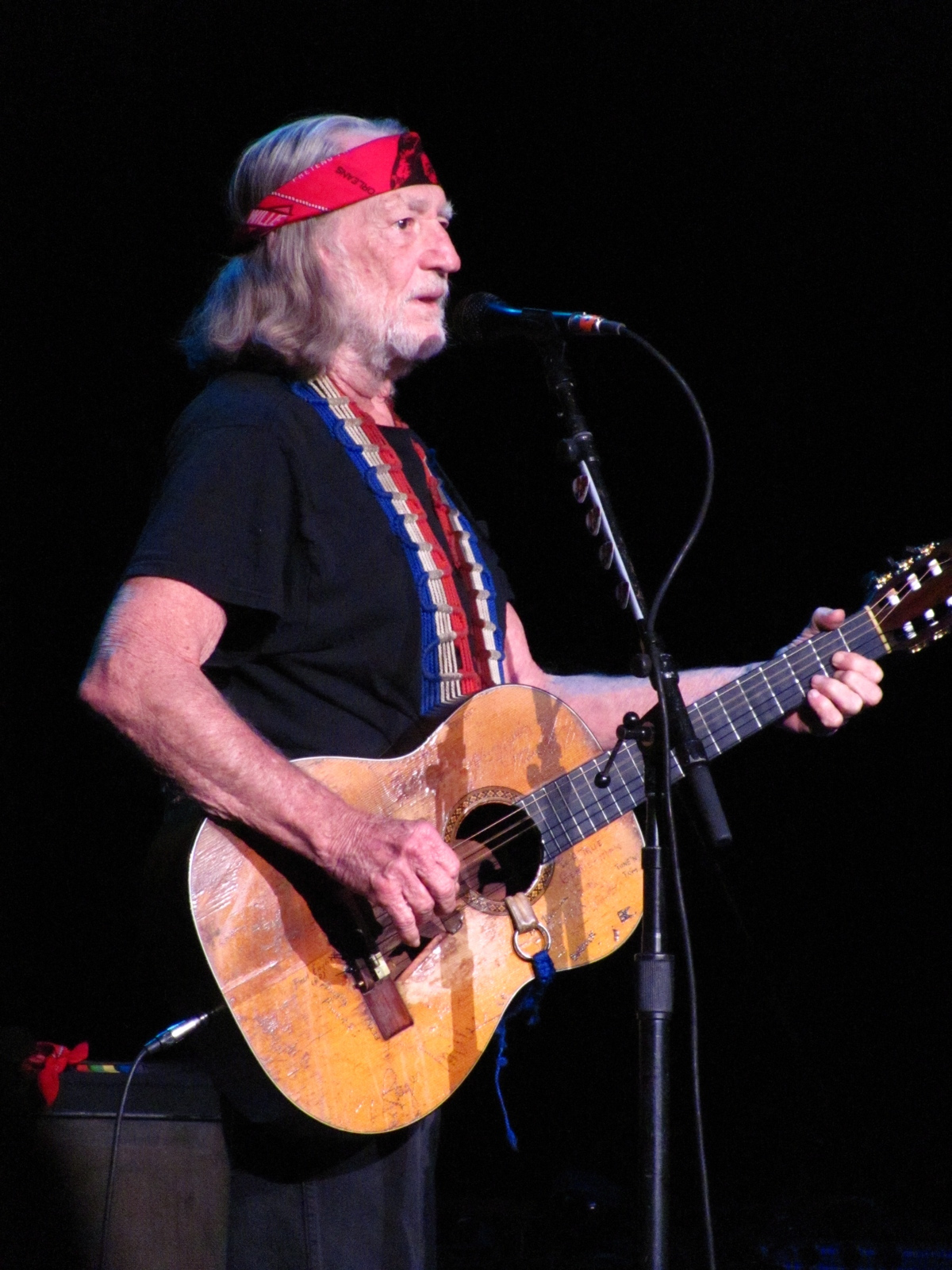
- Nelson in 2010
Awards and nominations
Award	Wins	Nominations
Grammy Awards	15	
American Music Award	8	
CMA Awards	10	
Academy of Country Music	5	
TNN/Music City News	2	
Broadcast Music Incorporated	2	

Totals (Note: Certain award groups do not simply award one winner. They acknowledge several different recipients, have runners-up, and have third place. Since this is a specific recognition and is different from losing an award, runner-up mentions are considered wins in this award tally. For simplification and to avoid errors, each award in this list has been presumed to have had a prior nomination.)
- Wins: 38

This is a list of awards and nominations received by Willie Nelson. Willie Nelson is an American country musician whose critical success with the albums Shotgun Willie, Phases and Stages, and the commercial success of Red Headed Stranger and Stardust made him one of the most recognized artists in country music.

== Grammy Awards ==
The Grammy Awards are awarded annually by the National Academy of Recording Arts and Sciences to recognize outstanding achievements in music, and are widely regarded as the most prestigious awards in the music industry worldwide. Nelson has won 12 awards from 57 nominations, in addition to the Grammy Legend Award in 1990 and the Grammy Lifetime Achievement Award in 2000.

Year	Nominee / work	Award	Result
1975	"After the Fire Is Gone" with Tracy Nelson	Best Country Performance by a Duo or Group with Vocal	Nominated
1976	"Blue Eyes Crying in the Rain"	Best Male Country Vocal Performance	Won
1977	"I'd Have to be Crazy"	Best Male Country Vocal Performance	Nominated
1977	"Amazing Grace"	Best Inspirational Performance	Nominated
1979	"Georgia on My Mind"	Best Male Country Vocal Performance	Won
1979	"Mammas Don't Let Your Babies Grow Up to Be Cowboys" with Waylon Jennings	Best Country Performance by a Duo or Group with Vocal	Won
1980	"Heartbreak Hotel" with Leon Russell	Best Country Performance by a Duo or Group with Vocal	Nominated
1980	"I Saw the Light"	Best Inspirational Performance	Nominated
1980	"Whiskey River"	Best Male Country Vocal Performance	Nominated
1981	"On the Road Again"	Best Male Country Vocal Performance	Nominated
1981	"On the Road Again"	Best Country Song	Won
1981	Family Bible	Best Inspirational Performance	Nominated
1982	"Somewhere Over the Rainbow"	Best Male Country Vocal Performance	Nominated
1983	"Always on My Mind"	Best Male Country Vocal Performance	Won
1983	"Always on My Mind"	Record of the Year	Nominated
1983	"(Sittin' On) The Dock of the Bay" with Waylon Jennings	Best Country Performance by a Duo or Group with Vocal	Nominated
1984	"Pancho and Lefty" with Waylon Jennings	Best Country Performance by a Duo or Group with Vocal	Nominated
1984	Take It to the Limit with Waylon Jennings	Best Country Performance by a Duo or Group with Vocal	Nominated
1985	"As Time Goes By" with Julio Iglesias	Best Country Performance by a Duo or Group with Vocal	Nominated
1985	"City of New Orleans"	Best Male Country Vocal Performance	Nominated
1986	"Forgiving You Was Easy"	Best Male Country Vocal Performance	Nominated
1986	"Highwayman" with The Highwaymen	Best Country Performance by a Duo or Group with Vocal	Nominated
1990	Legend Award		Won
1991	Highwayman 2 with The Highwaymen	Best Country Collaboration with Vocals	Nominated
1995	Moonlight Becomes You	Best Traditional Pop Vocal Performance	Nominated
1997	How Great Thou Art	Best Southern, Country or Bluegrass Gospel Album	Nominated
1998	"Peach Pickin' Time Down In Georgia"	Best Male Country Vocal Performance	Nominated
2000	"Going Away Party" with Asleep at the Wheel] and The Manhattan Transfer	Best Country Collaboration with Vocals	Nominated
2000	"Night and Day"	Best Pop Instrumental Performance	Nominated
2000	Lifetime Achievement Award		Won
2001	"Teatro"	Best Long Form Music Video	Nominated
2001	Milk Cow Blues	Best Traditional Blues Album	Nominated
2002	"Maria"	Best Male Country Vocal Performance	Nominated
2002	Rainbow Connection	Best Country Album	Nominated
2003	The Great Divide	Best Country Album	Nominated
2003	"Mendocino County Line" with Lee Ann Womack	Best Country Collaboration with Vocals	Won
2004	"Beer for My Horses" with Toby Keith	Best Country Collaboration with Vocals	Nominated
2004	"The Wurlitzer Prize (I Don't Want to Get Over You)" with Waylon Jennings	Best Country Collaboration with Vocals	Nominated
2004	Live and Kickin'	Best Country Album	Nominated
2004	Run That by Me One More Time with Ray Price	Best Country Album	Nominated
2005	"Pancho and Lefty" with Merle Haggard and Toby Keith	Best Country Collaboration with Vocals	Nominated
2005	"You Are My Flower"	Best Male Country Vocal Performance	Nominated
2006	"Good Ol' Boys"	Best Male Country Vocal Performance	Nominated
2006	"Dreams Come True" with Norah Jones	Best Country Collaboration with Vocals	Nominated
2007	You Don't Know Me: The Songs of Cindy Walker	Best Country Album	Nominated
2008	"Lost Highway" with Merle Haggard and Ray Price	Best Country Collaboration with Vocals	Won
2010	American Classic	Best Traditional Pop Vocal Album	Nominated
2010	"Baby, It's Cold Outside" with Norah Jones	Best Pop Collaboration with Vocals	Nominated
2010	Willie and the Wheel with Asleep at the Wheel	Best Americana Album	Nominated
2011	Country Music	Best Americana Album	Nominated
2017	Summertime: Willie Nelson Sings Gershwin	Best Traditional Pop Vocal Album	Won
2019	My Way	Best Traditional Pop Vocal Album	Won
2019	"Last Man Standing"	Best American Roots Performance	Nominated
2020	"Ride Me Back Home"	Best Country Solo Performance	Won
2022	That's Life	Best Traditional Pop Vocal Album	Nominated
2023	A Beautiful Time	Best Country Album	Won
2023	"Live Forever"	Best Country Solo Performance	Won
2023	Best Roots Gospel Album	The Willie Nelson Family	Nominated
2024	Bluegrass	Best Bluegrass Album	Nominated
2026	Last Leaf on the Tree	Best Americana Album	Nominated
2026	Oh What a Beautiful World	Best Traditional Country Album	Nominated

== Country Music Association Awards ==
The Country Music Association Awards are held annually by the Country Music Association and celebrate excellence and achievements in the country genre. Nelson has won 11 awards from 48 nominations.

== Academy of Country Music Awards ==
The Academy of Country Music Awards are held annually by the Academy of Country Music to honor yearly accomplishments in country music. Nelson has won 12 awards from 43 nominations.

== American Music Awards ==
The American Music Awards are held annually to recognize outstanding achievements in the music industry. Nelson has won 12 awards.

== Honors ==
- Nelson became a member of the Grand Ole Opry on November 28, 1964.
- Nelson was inducted into the Nashville Songwriters Hall of Fame in 1973.
- Nelson was inducted into the Country Music Hall of Fame in 1993.
- Nelson became a Kennedy Center Honoree in 1998.
- Nelson was inducted into the Songwriters Hall of Fame in 2001. He had previously received their Sammy Cahn Lifetime Achievement Award in 1983.
- Nelson received the Lifetime Achievement Award for Songwriting at the Americana Music Honors & Awards in 2007.
- Nelson received the Gershwin Prize from the Library of Congress in 2015.
- Nelson was inducted into the Rock and Roll Hall of Fame in 2023.
- Nelson was ranked #54 on Rolling Stone's "200 Greatest Singers of All Time" list in 2023. He was previously featured at #88 on the 2008 iteration of the list.

== Awards ==
Year	Organization	Award
1975	Grammy	Best Male Country Vocal Performance
1976	CMA Awards	Vocal Duo of the Year
1976	CMA Awards	Single of the Year
1976	CMA Awards	Album of the Year
1977	American Music Awards	Favorite Single
1978	Grammy	Best Male Country Vocal Performance
1978	Grammy	Best Country Performance by Duo/Group W/Vocals
1979	CMA Awards	Entertainer of the Year
1979	ACM	Entertainer of the Year
1980	Grammy	Best Country Song
1982	Grammy	Best Male Country Vocal Performance
1982	CMA Awards	Single of the Year
1982	CMA Awards	Album of the Year
1982	American Music Awards	Favorite Male Artist
1982	ACM	Single of the Year
1982	ACM	Album of the Year
1983	CMA Awards	Vocal Duo of the Year
1983	American Music Awards	Favorite Album
1984	CMA Awards	Vocal Duo of the Year
1984	American Music Awards	Favorite Male Artistr
1984	ACM	Single of the Year
1985	ACM	Single of the Year
1986	American Music Awards	Favorite Singler
1986	American Music Awards	Favorite Male Artistr
1986	American Music Awards	Award of Appreciation
1987	American Music Awards	Favorite Male Artistr
1990	Grammy	Legend Awards
1995	TNN/Music City News	Minnie Pearl Awardr
1995	TNN/Music City News	Living Legendr
1999	Grammy	Lifetime Achievement Award
2001	BMI 49th Annual Country Awards	President's Award
2002	Grammy	Best Country Collaboration With Vocals
2002	CMT Flameworthy Video Music Awards	Video Collaboration of the Year
2002	CMA Awards	Vocal Event of the Year (with Lee Ann Womack)
2003	CMT's 40 Greatest Men of Country Music	#4 ranking
2003	Grammy	Best Country Collaboration With Vocals
2004	CMT Flameworthy Video Music Awards	Video Collaboration of the Year
2007	BMI 55th Annual Country Awards	BMI Icon
2008	Grammy	Best Country Collaboration With Vocals
2008	Rolling Stone	100 Greatest Singers Of All Time - No. 88
2012	CMA Awards	Willie Nelson Lifetime Achievement Award
2015	Gershwin Prize	Library of Congress Gershwin Prize
2017	Grammy	Best Traditional Pop Vocal Album
2017	ACM Awards	Poet's Award
2017	CMA Awards	Vocal Event of the Year (with Glen Campbell)
2019	Grammy	Best Traditional Pop Vocal Album
2020	Grammy	Best Country Solo Performance
2023	Grammy	Best Country Solo Performance Best Country Album
2023	Rock and Roll Hall of Fame	Inductee
