= I Don't Know a Thing About Love =

I Don't Know A Thing About Love

Studio album by Willie Nelson
- Released: March 3, 2023
- Studio: Sound Emporium (Nashville, Tennessee); East Iris (Nashville, Tennessee); Blackbird (Nashville, Tennessee); Pedernales Recording (Spicewood, Texas)
- Genre: Country
- Length: 32:11
- Label: Legacy
- Producer: Buddy Cannon

Willie Nelson chronology
A Beautiful Time (2022)	I Don't Know A Thing About Love (2023)	Bluegrass (2023)

I Don't Know A Thing About Love: The Songs of Harlan Howard is the 73rd solo studio album by Willie Nelson, released on March 3, 2023. Produced by Buddy Cannon, the album is a tribute to the songwriter Harlan Howard.

== Content ==
The album is a collection of ten songs performed by Nelson and originally written by Harlan Howard. Howard gave Nelson his first job as a songwriter for the publishing company Pamper Music. The album was produced by Buddy Cannon, and features cover art by Nelson's son, Micah.

The album was released on March 3, 2023, the 21st anniversary of Howard's death. On January 17, 2023, Nelson released the single "Busted".

== Critical reception ==
Professional ratings
Aggregate scores
Source	Rating
Metacritic	84/100
Review scores
Source	Rating
AllMusic	3.5/5 stars
American Songwriter	4/5 stars
And It Don't Stop	A−
The Arts Desk	5/5 stars

I Don't Know A Thing About Love: The Songs of Harlan Howard received positive reviews from music critics. At Metacritic, which assigns a normalized rating out of 100 to reviews from mainstream critics, the album received a score of 84 out of 100 based on four reviews, indicating "universal acclaim".

Stephen Thomas Erlewine at AllMusic praised Nelson's voice and said that while the arrangements of Howard's songs held few surprises, this put the focus on the "ace band", resulting in a record which sounds "easy and relaxed, familiar and fresh" while No Depression concluded that "even when the songs are coming out of his mouth instead of his head, Nelson still delivers the goods like nobody's business but his own." Liz Thomson of The Arts Desk called the album "a real doozy, an album with which it's impossible not to fall in love," praising Howard's "irresistible" songs, the musicianship and Nelson's "remarkably secure" voice. Tom Dunne of The Irish Examiner listed this as one of his six favorite albums of the year so far in mid-April 2023.

== Track listing ==
No.	Title	Writer(s)	Length
1.	"Tiger By the Tail"	Harlan Howard; Buck Owens	2:24
2.	"The Chokin' Kind"	Howard	3:17
3.	"Excuse Me (I Think I've Got a Heartache)"	Howard; Buck Owens	2:34
4.	"Life Turned Her That Way"	Howard	2:53
5.	"I Don't Know a Thing About Love"	Howard	2:58
6.	"Streets of Baltimore"	Tompall Glaser; Howard	3:01
7.	"Busted"	Howard	3:28
8.	"She Called Me Baby"	Howard	3:32
9.	"Too Many Rivers"	Howard	3:55
10.	"Beautiful Annabel Lee"	Howard	4:09
Total length:			32:11

== Personnel ==
Performance

- Wyatt Beard – background vocals
- Melonie Cannon – background vocals
- Jim "Moose" Brown – piano, synthesizer, Hammond B-3 organ, Wurlitzer electric piano
- Mike Johnson – steel guitar
- James Mitchell – electric guitar
- Willie Nelson – lead vocals, Trigger
- Larry Paxton – bass, tic tac bass
- Mickey Raphael – harmonica
- Bobby Terry – acoustic guitar, electric guitar
- Lonnie Wilson – drums

Production

- Buddy Cannon – production
- Tony Castle – recording, mixing
- Steve Chadie – recording
- Shannon Finnegan – production coordinator
- Andrew Mendelson – mastering

Other personnel

- Micah Nelson – artwork

== Charts ==
Chart performance for I Don't Know a Thing About Love
Chart (2023)	Peak position
Swiss Albums (Schweizer Hitparade)	85
