= The Willie Nelson Family =

Studio album by Willie Nelson
- Released: November 19, 2021
- Studio: Pedernales Recording (Spicewood, Texas)
- Genre: Country
- Length: 31:55
- Label: Legacy
- Producer: Willie Nelson, Steve Chadie

Willie Nelson chronology
That's Life (2021)	The Willie Nelson Family (2021)	A Beautiful Time (2022)

The Willie Nelson Family is a collaborative studio album by Willie Nelson, his sons Lukas and Micah, his daughters Paula and Amy and his sister Bobbie Nelson, accompanied by the Family Band. The album was Bobbie's final before her death in 2022. The record includes covers of inspirational songs and reinterpretations of Nelson's classics. Lukas Nelson sings lead on the songs "All Things Must Pass" and "Keep It on the Sunnyside" and Micah Nelson sings lead on "Why Me". It was released on November 19, 2021. The album was nominated for the Grammy Award for Best Roots Gospel Album at the 65th Annual Grammy Awards.

== Critical reception ==
Professional ratings
Aggregate scores
Source	Rating
Metacritic	69/100
Review scores
Source	Rating
AllMusic	3/5 stars
NME	3/5 stars

The Willie Nelson Family received positive reviews from music critics. At Metacritic, which assigns a normalized rating out of 100 to reviews from mainstream critics, the album received a score of 69 out of 100 based on five reviews, indicating "generally favorable reviews".

== Track listing ==
No.	Title	Writer(s)	Length
1.	"Heaven and Hell"	Willie Nelson	2:22
2.	"Kneel at the Feet of Jesus"	Nelson	2:29
3.	"Laying My Burdens Down"	Nelson	1:48
4.	"Family Bible"	Nelson	2:48
5.	"In the Garden"	C. Austin Miles	3:24
6.	"All Things Must Pass"	George Harrison	3:36
7.	"I Saw the Light"	Hank Williams	1:52
8.	"In God's Eyes"	Nelson	2:55
9.	"Keep It on the Sunnyside"	A. P. Carter	2:54
10.	"I Thought About You, Lord"	Nelson	3:20
11.	"Too Sick to Pray"	Nelson	2:15
12.	"Why Me"	Kris Kristofferson	2:12
Total length:			31:55

== Personnel ==
Adapted from the album liner notes.

Performance

- Billy English – drums
- Paul English – percussion
- Amy Nelson – background vocals
- Bobbie Nelson – piano
- Lukas Nelson – acoustic guitar, background vocals, lead vocals on "All Things Must Pass" and "Keep It On The Sunnyside"
- Micah Nelson – acoustic guitar, drums, bass, background vocals, lead vocals on "Why Me"
- Paula Nelson – background vocals
- Willie Nelson – lead vocals, background vocals, Trigger
- Mickey Raphael – harmonica
- Kevin Smith – bass

Production

- Steve Chadie – production, recording, mixing
- Shannon Finnegan – production coordinator
- Charlie Kramsky – assistant engineer
- Willie Nelson – production
- Jerry Tubb – mastering

Other personnel

- Dalton Campbell – photography
- Frank Harkins – design
- Christopher Wray McCann – additional photography
