= Willie Nelson statue =

Bronze statue of Willie Nelson by Clete Shields in Austin, Texas, U.S.

- The statue, pictured in 2014
- Artist: Clete Shields
- Year: 2012
- Type: Sculpture
- Medium: Bronze
- Subject: Willie Nelson
- Dimensions: 240 cm (8 ft)
- Location: Austin, Texas, United States; 30°15′54.6″N 97°44′48.3″W

The Willie Nelson statue, or simply Willie, is a bronze sculpture of singer-songwriter Willie Nelson, located in Downtown Austin, Texas. The statue was commissioned to artist Clete Shields by the nonprofit organization Capital Area Statues.

Following his move to Nashville in 1960, Nelson enjoyed success as a songwriter, but his career as a singer did not progress. After shortly retiring from the music business, Nelson moved to Austin in 1972, where his career found new success as a performer.

Knowing of the plans for the statue, Austin mayor Lee Leffingwell proposed to rename a portion of Second Street to Willie Nelson Boulevard. The unveiling of the statue took place on April 20, 2012 at 4:20 pm with Nelson in attendance.

== Background ==
In 1960, Willie Nelson moved to Nashville, Tennessee, and worked as a songwriter for Pamper Music. The publishing company was owned by Ray Price. While his songs became hits for other artists, Nelson toured as a band member in Price's Cherokee Cowboys. Nelson signed his first recording contract in 1961 with Liberty Records, and by 1964 he had moved to RCA Records. By 1970, Nelson had invested his earnings in tours that did not produce profit. The same year, he divorced his then wife, and his ranch in Ridgetop, Tennessee burned down. Nelson saw the events as a need for a change. He moved to Bandera, Texas, and re-married. In 1972, unhappy with his career, he decided to retire from music.

Nelson moved to Austin, Texas in 1972. The Austin musical scene, and his performances at the Armadillo World Headquarters rejuvenated his career. Local audiences welcomed his style of country music marked by traditional country, folk and jazz influences. In 1974, Nelson produced and performed on the pilot of PBS' Austin City Limits. The following year, he raised funds for PBS-affiliated stations across the south promoting the show. The pilot was aired first on those stations, later being released nationwide. The positive reception of the show prompted PBS to order ten episodes for 1976, formally launching the show. In 1979, he purchased the Pedernales Country Club near Lake Travis. Nelson kept the golf course, and he build a studio designed by Chips Moman.

== Statue and Willie Nelson Boulevard ==
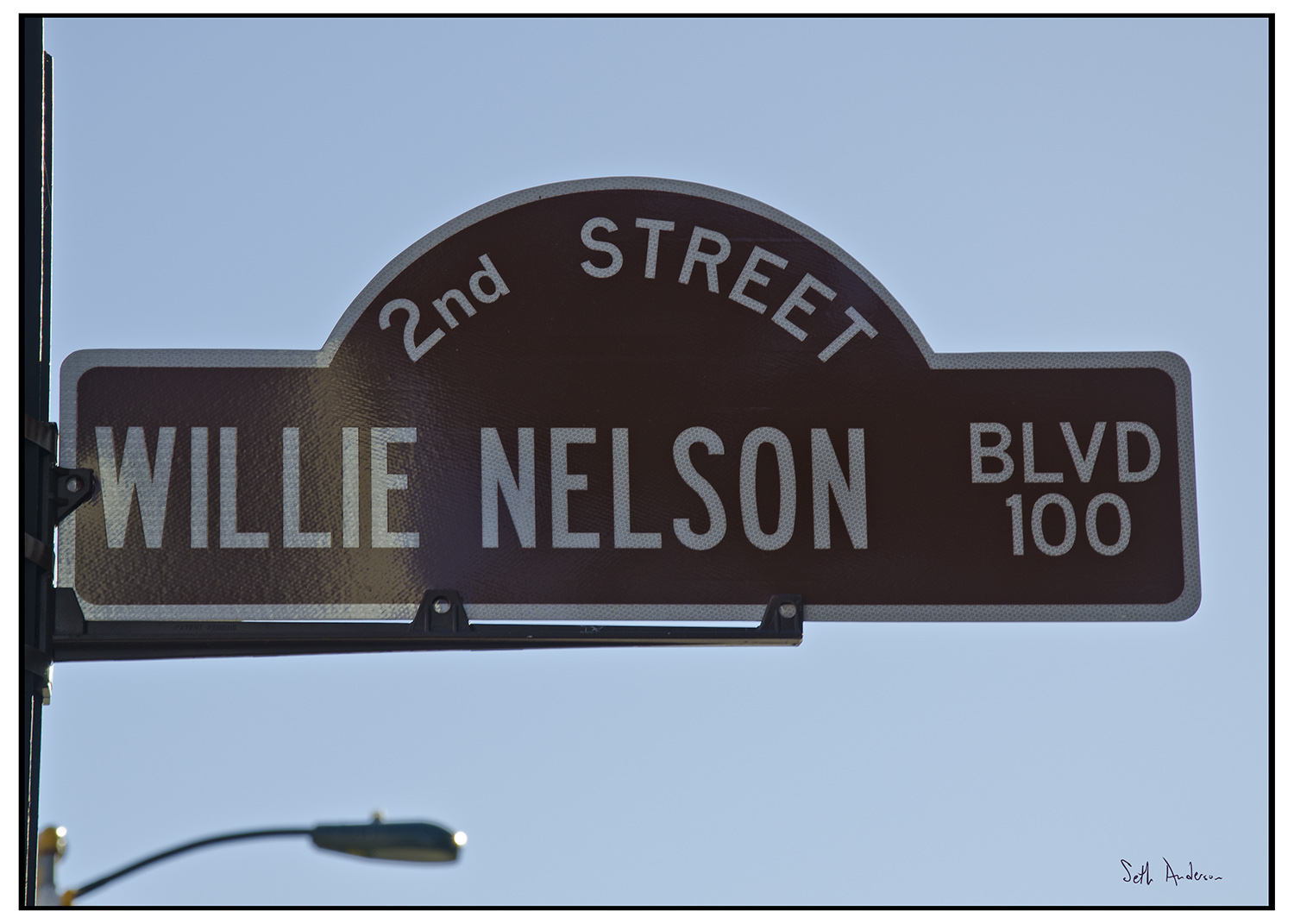
Willie Nelson Boulevard sign in 2010

In 2010, the nonprofit organization Capital Area Statues commissioned a bronze sculpture of Nelson to Philadelphia artist Clete Shields. Shields had met board member Elizabeth Avellán at the 1995 San Diego Comic-Con. In 2009, Avellán called Shields with the proposal for a Nelson statue. She requested Shields to portray on it Nelson facing the crowd, "approchable; and he had to have that twinkle in his eye." Shields made several versions in clay. The artist visited Nelson, and expressed his desire to capture the singer's "humor and humility". The organization wanted to fund the statue based on public donations, with an estimated cost of US$150,000 to $250,000. 18-inch replicas of the model were given to the donors that contributed with over $10,000. The commission of the statue was announced during the development of Block 21 in Downtown Austin in 2010. Mayor Lee Leffingwell considered the upcoming opening at the development of the new venue for Austin City Limits, The Moody Theater, and Nelson's forty year residence in the city to rename that section of Second Street to Willie Nelson Boulevard. In December 2010, it was announced that the 8 feet (2.4 m) statue would be placed at the entrance of the Moody Theater, on Second and Lavaca streets. The statue was presented at Troublemaker Studios in November 2011 with Nelson in attendance.

The larger than life size bronze statue depicts Nelson perched on a stool, dressed in his typical style with a bandana over trailing braids of hair, a sleeveless t-shirt, long pants and boots, with his guitar Trigger slung under his left arm. The statue accurately depicts the large hole above Trigger's bridge, a hole worn into the guitar by Nelson during decades of use.

Nelson's statue was unveiled on April 20, 2012 (4/20 Day) at 4:20 p.m. Lawrence Wright, the president of Capital Area Statues considered it a "complete and utter coincidence." The date was convenient for Nelson and Kris Kristofferson, who were due to perform a Johnny Cash tribute concert that night on Austin City Limits. Nelson, Mayor Leffingwell, and members of the Austin City Council were in attendance, as well as Kristofferson. Nelson told journalist Andy Lager: "I'll be stoned one thousand years." The singer performed for the crowd "On the Road Again", followed by his latest composition "Roll Me Up and Smoke Me When I Die".
