= A Beautiful Time =

Studio album by Willie Nelson
- Released: April 29, 2022
- Studios: The Tracking Room (Nashville, Tennessee); East Iris (Nashville, Tennessee); Blackbird (Nashville, Tennessee); Pedernales Recording (Spicewood, Texas); Sound Emporium (Nashville, Tennessee)
- Genre: Country
- Length: 49:19
- Label: Legacy
- Producer: Buddy Cannon

Willie Nelson chronology
The Willie Nelson Family (2021)	A Beautiful Time (2022)	I Don't Know a Thing About Love (2023)

A Beautiful Time is the 72nd solo studio album by Willie Nelson, released on April 29, 2022, on his 89th birthday. Produced by Buddy Cannon, the album includes original songs by Nelson, as well as covers of the Beatles and Leonard Cohen.

On February 10, 2022, Nelson released the single "I'll Love You Till the Day I Die" a song written by Chris Stapleton and Rodney Crowell.

A Beautiful Time won the Grammy Award for Best Country Album at the 65th Annual Grammy Awards while Crowell and Stapleton's lead single "I'll Love You Till the Day I Die" was a nominee in the Best Country Song category at the same awards.

== Critical reception ==
Professional ratings
Aggregate scores
Source	Rating
Metacritic	84/100
Review scores
Source	Rating
AllMusic	4/5 stars
And It Don't Stop	A
The Arts Desk	4/5 stars

A Beautiful Time received positive reviews from music critics. At Metacritic, which assigns a normalized rating out of 100 to reviews from mainstream critics, the album received a score of 84 out of 100 based on four reviews, indicating "universal acclaim".

Stephen Thomas Erlewine at AllMusic praised the record's "earned wisdom and wry humor", concluding that "it's still a marvel to hear him find sustenance and surprises within his music". Liz Thomson of The Arts Desk called the album "classic Nelson" while No Depression, though acknowledging that the remote recording meant that the musicians performed without "other players to bounce off", praised Nelson's vocals and guitar playing and gave their verdict that it "is a delightful album from beginning to end". Veteran critic Robert Christgau ranked it as the fourth best album of 2022.

== Track listing ==
No.	Title	Writer(s)	Length
1.	"I'll Love You Till the Day I Die"	Chris Stapleton; Rodney Crowell	4:11
2.	"My Heart Was a Dancer"	Willie Nelson; Buddy Cannon	3:11
3.	"Energy Follows Thought"	Nelson; Cannon	3:18
4.	"Dreamin' Again"	Jack Wesley Routh; Douglas Graham	3:57
5.	"I Don't Go to Funerals"	Nelson; Cannon	2:27
6.	"A Beautiful Time"	Shawn Camp	4:57
7.	"We're Not Happy (Till You're Not Happy)"	Camp; Charles R. Humphrey III	3:17
8.	"Dusty Bottles"	Jim "Moose" Brown; Scotty Emerick; Don Sampson	3:31
9.	"Me and My Partner"	Ken Lambert	2:12
10.	"Tower of Song"	Leonard Cohen	5:00
11.	"Live Every Day"	Nelson; Cannon	3:12
12.	"Don't Touch Me There"	Nelson; Cannon	2:38
13.	"With a Little Help from My Friends"	John Lennon; Paul McCartney	3:43
14.	"Leave You with a Smile"	Cannon; Bobby Terry; Matt Rossi	3:42
Total length:			49:19

== Personnel ==
Performance

- Barry Bales – upright bass
- Jim "Moose" Brown – piano, B-3 organ, synthesizer, Wurlitzer
- Buddy Cannon – background vocals
- Melonie Cannon – background vocals
- Chad Cromwell – drums
- Fred Eltringham – drums, percussion
- Kevin "Swine" Grant – upright bass
- Mike Johnson – steel guitar
- Catherine Marx – Wurlitzer, piano, B-3 organ
- James Mitchell – electric guitar
- Willie Nelson – lead vocals, Trigger
- Mickey Raphael – harmonica
- Bobby Terry – acoustic guitar, electric guitar, steel guitar, bass, piano
- Lonnie Wilson – drums, percussion

Production

- Buddy Cannon – production
- Tony Castle – recording, mixing
- Steve Chadie – recording
- Shannon Finnegan – production coordinator
- Andrew Mendelson – mastering

Other personnel

- Frank Harkins – art direction and design
- Pamela Springsteen – photography

== Charts ==
Chart performance for A Beautiful Time
Chart (2022)	Peak position
Australian Albums (ARIA)	122
Australian Country Albums (ARIA)	8
Austrian Albums (Ö3 Austria)	49
Belgian Albums (Ultratop Flanders)	100
Dutch Albums (Album Top 100)	74
German Albums (Offizielle Top 100)	44
Scottish Albums (Official Charts)	14
Swiss Albums (Schweizer Hitparade)	19
UK Country Albums (Official Charts)	2
UK Album Downloads (Official Charts)	26
US Billboard 200	100
US Top Country Albums (Billboard)	13
