= That's Life (Willie Nelson album) =

Studio album by Willie Nelson
- Released: February 26, 2021
- Studio: Capitol Studios (Los Angeles, California); Pedernales Recording (Spicewood, Texas)
- Genre: Traditional pop; jazz
- Length: 34:38
- Label: Legacy
- Producer: Buddy Cannon; Matt Rollings

Willie Nelson chronology
First Rose of Spring (2020)	That's Life (2021)	The Willie Nelson Family (2021)

Singles from That's Life
- 1. "A Cottage for Sale" Released: December 11, 2020

That's Life is the 71st solo studio album by Willie Nelson. It was released on February 26, 2021, by Legacy Recordings. A tribute to Frank Sinatra, it represents the second volume of Nelson's Sinatra collection, following 2018's My Way.

Produced by Buddy Cannon and Matt Rollings, it was mainly recorded on Capitol Studios, the original studio used for several of Sinatra's recordings. Additional tracks were recorded at Nelson's Pedernales studio. The release was mixed by engineer Al Schmitt, featuring string and brass arrangements. The cover of the album features a painting of Nelson evoking the cover of Sinatra's In the Wee Small Hours.

That's Life was nominated for the 2022 Grammy Award for Best Traditional Pop Vocal Album.

== Critical reception ==
Professional ratings
Aggregate scores
Source	Rating
Metacritic	80/100
Review scores
Source	Rating
AllMusic	4/5 stars
American Songwriter	4/5 stars

That's Life received positive reviews from music critics. At Metacritic, which assigns a normalized rating out of 100 to reviews from mainstream critics, the album received a score of 80 out of 100 based on five reviews, indicating "generally favorable reviews".

Lee Zimmerman of American Songwriter said that Nelson "captures the feel and finesse of the original renditions and succeeds in making them his own." In The Daily Telegraph Neil McCormick praised the "different pathos" Nelson brought to the material and characterised the album as "another loving and elegant tribute to an old friend and American legend."

== Track listing ==
That's Life track listing
No.	Title	Writer(s)	Length
1.	"Nice Work If You Can Get It"	George Gershwin; Ira Gershwin	2:35
2.	"Just in Time"	Jule Styne; Betty Comden; Adolph Green	2:25
3.	"A Cottage for Sale"	Willard Robison; Larry Conley	2:54
4.	"I've Got You Under My Skin"	Cole Porter	3:34
5.	"You Make Me Feel So Young"	Josef Myrow; Mack Gordon	2:52
6.	"I Won't Dance" (featuring Diana Krall)	Jerome Kern; Dorothy Fields; Jimmy McHugh; Oscar Hammerstein II; Otto Harbach	3:25
7.	"That's Life"	Dean Kay; Kelly Gordon	3:39
8.	"Luck Be a Lady"	Frank Loesser	3:04
9.	"In the Wee Small Hours of the Morning"	David Mann; Bob Hilliard	2:58
10.	"Learnin' the Blues"	Dolores Silvers	3:31
11.	"Lonesome Road"	Nathaniel Shilkret; Gene Austin	3:41
Total length:			34:38

== Personnel ==
Musicians

- Willie Nelson – vocals, Trigger
- David Angell – strings
- Monisa Angell – strings
- Carrie Bailey – strings
- Kevin Bate – strings
- Jay Bellerose – clapping, drums, tambourine
- Buddy Cannon – clapping
- Ed Cherney – clapping
- Jeff Coffin – tenor saxophone
- David Davidson – strings
- Mark Douthit – alto saxophone, baritone saxophone
- Conni Ellisor – strings
- Matt Forbes – clapping
- Paul Franklin – steel guitar
- Barry Green – trombone
- Cornelia Heard – strings
- Alison Hoffman – strings
- Diana Krall - vocals
- Chris McDonald – trombone
- Paul Nelson – strings
- Dean Parks – acoustic guitar, clapping, electric guitar
- Steve Patrick – piccolo trumpet, trumpet
- David Piltch – bass, clapping
- Mickey Raphael – harmonica
- Sari Reist – strings
- Matt Rollings – clapping, organ, piano, vibraphone
- Karen Winkelmann – strings
- Kristin Wilkinson – strings

Technical

- Buddy Cannon – production
- Matt Rollings – production, engineering, arrangements
- Eric Boulanger – mastering
- Al Schmitt – mixing
- Niko Bolas – mixing
- Dan Rudin – engineering
- Paul Silveria – engineering
- Ed Cherney – recording
- Steve Chadie – recording
- Tony Castle – recording
- Chandler Harrod – engineering assistance
- Charlie Kramsky – engineering assistance
- Jeff Fitzpatrick – engineering assistance
- Lucas Glenney-Tagtmeier – engineering assistance
- Sean Badum – engineering assistance
- Shane Burgess – engineering assistance
- Steve Genewick – engineering assistance

Visuals

- Frank Harkins – art direction, design
- Paul Mann – illustrations
- James Minchin – back cover photo

== Charts ==
Chart performance for That's Life
Chart (2021)	Peak position
Australian Albums (ARIA)	143
German Albums (Offizielle Top 100)	97
Swiss Albums (Schweizer Hitparade)	33
Scottish Albums (OCC)	18
US Billboard 200	58
