= Bluegrass (album) =

Studio album by Willie Nelson
- Released: September 15, 2023
- Studio: Blackbird (Nashville, Tennessee); Pedernales Recording (Spicewood, Texas)
- Genre: Bluegrass; country
- Length: 43:28
- Label: Legacy
- Producer: Buddy Cannon

Willie Nelson chronology
I Don't Know a Thing About Love (2023)	Bluegrass (2023)	The Border (2024)

Bluegrass is the 74th solo studio album by American singer-songwriter Willie Nelson, released on September 15, 2023 through Legacy Recordings. Produced by Buddy Cannon, the album is Nelson's first full album of bluegrass music and contains twelve reinterpretations of songs from Nelson's back catalogue. In an interview with AARP, Nelson revealed that this is the first album since the acquisition of Trigger where he did not record with his signature guitar. The album's lead single, a new version of the song "You Left Me a Long, Long Time Ago" that opened Nelson's 1972 album The Willie Way, was released on June 22, 2023. The album was nominated for the Grammy Award for Best Bluegrass Album at the 66th Annual Grammy Awards.

== Background and recording ==
Buddy Cannon told Texas Monthly that the original concept for the album had Nelson singing duets with bluegrass vocalists, an idea Cannon rejected as "gimmicky". Cannon, who favoured an approach closer to purism than Nelson's earlier album Country Music, selected the songs and assembled a backing band who recorded live together in Nashville over two days. The sole instrument overdubbed is the harmonica played by Mickey Raphael as Willie Nelson, who recorded his vocals in Austin, chose not to play Trigger.

== Critical reception ==
Professional ratings
Aggregate scores
Source	Rating
Metacritic	75/100
Review scores
Source	Rating
AllMusic	3.5/5 stars
American Songwriter	4/5 stars

Bluegrass received positive reviews from music critics. At Metacritic, which assigns a normalized rating out of 100 to reviews from mainstream critics, the album received a score of 75 out of 100 based on five reviews, indicating "generally favorable reviews".

Stephen Thomas Erlewine at AllMusic said that the album was "not a major shift for Willie" but praised the "lively setting" and "empathetic harmonies", concluding that the record was an "enjoyable detour". Hot Press praised all aspects of the album except for the cover art and remarked that it was "an album that's as near to a perfect record as makes no odds." American Songwriter said that the record was "in a word, a romp" where Nelson "offers wisdom as much as entertainment" and praised the "stripped-down acoustic" nature of the album, comparing it to an Unplugged release.

== Track listing ==
All tracks are written by Willie Nelson, except for "Good Hearted Woman", co-written by Waylon Jennings.

Bluegrass track listing
No.	Title	Length
1.	"No Love Around"	3:13
2.	"Somebody Pick Up My Pieces"	5:12
3.	"Good Hearted Woman"	4:58
4.	"Sad Songs and Waltzes"	3:38
5.	"Home Motel"	4:24
6.	"You Left Me a Long, Long Time Ago"	4:18
7.	"Yesterday's Wine"	3:27
8.	"Bloody Mary Morning"	3:04
9.	"Slow Down Old World"	2:14
10.	"Still Is Still Moving to Me"	4:00
11.	"On the Road Again"	2:40
12.	"Man With the Blues"	2:20
Total length:		43:28

== Personnel ==
Performance

- Barry Bales – upright bass
- Wyatt Beard – background vocals
- Ron Block – banjo
- Buddy Cannon – background vocals
- Melonie Cannon – background vocals
- Aubrey Haynie – fiddle
- Rob Ickes – dobro
- Josh Martin – acoustic guitar
- Willie Nelson – lead vocals
- Mickey Raphael – harmonica
- Seth Taylor – mandolin
- Bobby Terry – acoustic guitar, gut string guitar
- Dan Tyminski – mandolin

Production

- Buddy Cannon – production
- Tony Castle – recording, mixing
- Steve Chadie – recording
- Shannon Finnegan – production coordinator
- Andrew Mendelson – mastering

Other personnel

- Micah Nelson – artwork

== Charts ==
Chart performance for Bluegrass
Chart (2023)	Peak position
Scottish Albums (OCC)	63
Swiss Albums (Schweizer Hitparade)	64
UK Country Albums (OCC)	4
