= My Own Peculiar Way =

Studio album by Willie Nelson
- Released: February 1969
- Recorded: November 1968
- Studios: RCA Studio B (Nashville, Tennessee)
- Genre: Country
- Label: RCA Victor
- Producer: Chet Atkins

Willie Nelson chronology
Good Times (1968)	My Own Peculiar Way (1969)	Both Sides Now (1970)

My Own Peculiar Way is the ninth studio album by country singer Willie Nelson. It was his last release of the 1960s. Bergen White was the conductor and arranger. It became Willie's first studio album on which he used his new Martin N-20 classical acoustic guitar, which he named "Trigger".

== Recording and composition ==
Nelson recorded the title track on his debut album for Liberty seven years earlier. The song had also been covered by Perry Como. The album contains several Nelson originals, as well as a song written with Nelson's songwriting friend Hank Cochran, “Any Old Arms Won’t Do.” Perhaps the most significant musical development on My Own Peculiar Way was Nelson discovering the Martin N-20 classical guitar that would become known as "Trigger". In his autobiography the singer recalls:

I switched over to a big Baldwin hooked up to an aluminum amp. When the neck broke, I traded it in for a Martin made of rosewood, an acoustic model with the richest, most soulful tone I’d ever heard. I had my man Shot Jackson, a guitar genius in Nashville, customize the Martin by integrating the guts and pickup from the Baldwin. It worked. I had the sound I was looking for. I heard it as a human sound, a sound close to my own voice. Didn’t take long for me to pick a hole in it. That’s ‘cause classical guitars aren’t meant to be picked. But that hole...seemed to deepen its soulful tone.

The Martin guitar changed his sound but, as Nelson biographer Joe Nick Patoski asserts, “you couldn’t tell by the records he was making. Vibes, trumpets, violins, a cello, saxophones, and a trombone embellished My Own Peculiar Way.” Nelson actually scored a surprise hit previously with the upbeat “Bring Me Sunshine,” a song written by Sylvia Dee and Arthur Kent. Featuring an impressive imitation of a Vegas lounge singer, Nelson took the song to number 13 on the country singles chart, his best showing yet for RCA. However, the first single from his new album, “Natural to Be Gone,” bombed, not even charting, and the LP barely made the Top 40, peaking at number 39. By this time even Atkins was stumped, later confessing, "With a record company you can have a whole room full of people who all put their heads together and grind away at a problem and still come up with the wrong answer."

== Reception ==
AllMusic: “When Nelson gets into a song, he has a way of playing with the sounds and rhythm of words to get everything possible from a song. Nearly every song on this record is like that, whether it's one he penned or a cover like John Hartford's ‘Natural to Be Gone.’”

Professional ratings
Review scores
Source	Rating
AllMusic	3/5 stars

== Track listing ==
All tracks composed by Willie Nelson, except where noted.

1. "My Own Peculiar Way"
2. "I Walk Alone" (Herbert Wilson)
3. "Any Old Arms Won't Do" (Hank Cochran, Nelson)
4. "I Just Don't Understand"
5. "I Just Dropped By"
6. "Local Memory"
7. "That's All" (Merle Travis)
8. "I Let My Mind Wander"
9. "Natural to Be Gone" (John Hartford)
10. "Love Has a Mind of Its Own" (Dallas Frazier)
11. "Message"
12. "It Will Come to Pass" (Don Baird)

== Personnel ==
- Willie Nelson – vocals, guitar
- Grady Martin – guitar
- Jerry Reed – guitar
- Wayne Moss – guitar
- Charlie McCoy – guitar, piano, vibes
- Bob Moore – bass
- David Briggs – piano
- Buddy Harman – drums
- Jerry Carrigan – drums

== Bibliography ==
- Nelson, Willie; Shrake, Bud (1988). Willie: An Autobiography. Simon and Schuster. ISBN 978-0671680756.
- Nelson, Willie; Ritz, David (2015). It's A Long Story: My Life. Little, Brown and Company. ISBN 9780316339315.
- Patoski, Joe Nick (2008). Willie Nelson: An Epic Life. Hachette Digital. ISBN 978-0-316-01778-7.
