= Countryman (album) =

Studio album by Willie Nelson
- Released: August 2, 2005
- Recorded: 1995 – 2004
- Genres: Reggae; country
- Length: 32:30
- Label: Lost Highway

Willie Nelson chronology
It Always Will Be (2004)	Countryman (2005)	You Don't Know Me: The Songs of Cindy Walker (2006)

Professional ratings
Review scores
Source	Rating
AllMusic	2.5/5 stars
The Austin Chronicle	3/5 stars
Entertainment Weekly	C−
Gigwise	2.5/5 stars
The Independent	3/5 stars
Now	1/5 stars
Pitchfork	3.8/10
PopMatters	5/10
Rolling Stone	2/5 stars
Tom Hull – on the Web	B

Countryman is the 53rd studio album by Willie Nelson. Ten years in the making since 1995, Nelson's first ever reggae album merges the gospel and spirit found in both country and reggae. It was released on CD format on August 2, 2005, by the Lost Highway label. Nelson made two videos for this album "The Harder They Come" and "I'm a Worried Man", both videos were filmed in Jamaica.

== Track listing ==
All tracks are written by Willie Nelson except where noted.

No.	Title	Writer(s)	Length
1.	"Do You Mind Too Much If I Don't Understand"		2:46
2.	"How Long Is Forever"		3:19
3.	"I'm a Worried Man" (featuring Toots Hibbert)	Johnny Cash, June Carter Cash	2:31
4.	"The Harder They Come"	Jimmy Cliff	3:36
5.	"Something to Think About"		3:12
6.	"Sitting in Limbo"	Guilly Bright & Jimmy Cliff	2:39
7.	"Darkness on the Face of the Earth"		2:15
8.	"One in a Row"		3:31
9.	"I've Just Destroyed the World"	Nelson, Ray Price	2:42
10.	"You Left Me a Long, Long Time Ago"		2:59
11.	"I Guess I've Come to Live Here"		2:23
12.	"Undo the Right"	Hank Cochran, Nelson	2:30

== Personnel ==
- Sweet Pea Atkinson - vocals
- Dan Bosworth - guitar
- Harry Bowens - vocals
- Santa Davis - drums
- Richard Feldman - guitar
- Pam Hall - vocals
- Mikey Hyde - keyboards
- Randy Jacobs - guitar
- Wayne Jobson - guitar
- Donald Ray Mitchell - vocals
- Mickey Raphael - harmonica
- Paul "Pablo" Stennett - bass
- Stephen Stewart - keyboards
- Lieba Thomas - vocals
- Uziah Thompson - percussion
- Robby Turner - pedal steel guitar, resonator guitar
- Norris Webb - keyboards

== Chart performance ==
Chart (2005)	Peak position
U.S. Billboard Top Reggae Albums	1
U.S. Billboard Top Country Albums	6
U.S. Billboard 200	46
