= Come and Toke It =

2020 variety show

- Live stream concert by Willie Nelson (host)
- Date(s): April 20, 2020
- Duration: 6 hours
- Website: luckreunion.com/comeandtokeit

Come and Toke It is a variety show that was hosted by Willie Nelson and livestreamed on April 20, 2020. In reference to 420 day, "the unofficial weed holiday", it was planned to be four hours and twenty minutes long (it was actually six hours), and started 4:20 P.M. in Texas. Some of the content was cannabis-themed. Some of the proceeds will be used to support The Last Prisoner Project, a restorative justice program relating to persons convicted of cannabis related crimes. It was Nelson's third livestreamed benefit concert since the U.S. coronavirus pandemic lockdowns started in March, after two that raised $700,000 for people who had suffered financial loss due to effects on the U.S. economy.

The show booked music performers, entertainers, and other public figures including Kacey Musgraves, Matthew McConaughey, Jeff Bridges, Billy Ray Cyrus, Toby Keith, Tommy Chong, Ziggy Marley, Bill Maher, Aaron Lewis, Kevin Smith, Elle King, Nathaniel Rateliff, Shakey Graves, Angel Olsen, Lukas Nelson, Margo Price, Edie Brickell, Billy Joe Shaver, and Beto O'Rourke.
