= Luck Films =

American entertainment company

- Founded: 2010
- Founder: Willie Nelson
- Headquarters: Luck, Texas, United States
- Key people: Willie Nelson, Kerry Wallum, Norman Macera, Scott McCauley, David Von Roehm
- Website: luckfilms.com

Luck Films is a Luck, Texas-based company devoted to producing musical specials, television programs, feature films and internet content. The company was founded in 2010 by country music singer Willie Nelson, with the collaboration of producer Kerry Wallum, filmmaker Norman Macera and producer-directors Scott McCauley and David Von Roehm. It produces between three and five feature films yearly, with a budget that rounds US$3 million. The first two films created by the company were Shootout of Luck and The Dry Gulch Kid in 2010.
