= You Don't Know Me: The Songs of Cindy Walker =

2006 studio album by Willie Nelson

Studio album by Willie Nelson
- Released: March 14, 2006
- Genre: Country
- Length: 39:08
- Label: Lost Highway
- Producer: Fred Foster

Willie Nelson chronology
Countryman (2005)	You Don't Know Me: The Songs of Cindy Walker (2006)	Songbird (2006)

Professional ratings
Review scores
Source	Rating
AllMusic	3.5/5 stars
Rolling Stone	4.5/5 stars
Slant Magazine	3.5/5 stars

You Don't Know Me: The Songs of Cindy Walker is the 54th studio album by American country and western musician Willie Nelson. It was released on March 16, 2006, by the Lost Highway label. All tracks on the album were written by Cindy Walker. A video has been made for the track "You Don't Know Me". The album was released nine days before Walker's death.

== Track listing ==
All tracks composed by Cindy Walker; except where indicated

1. "Bubbles in My Beer" (Tommy Duncan, Cindy Walker, Bob Wills) – 2:51
2. "Not That I Care" – 2:57
3. "Take Me in Your Arms & Hold Me" – 3:22
4. "Don't Be Ashamed of Your Age" (Cindy Walker, Bob Wills) – 3:34
5. "You Don't Know Me" (Cindy Walker, Eddy Arnold) – 3:42
6. "Sugar Moon" – 2:28
7. "I Don't Care" (Cindy Walker, Webb Pierce) – 2:56
8. "Cherokee Maiden" – 3:09
9. "The Warm Red Wine" – 2:51
10. "Miss Molly" – 2:34
11. "Dusty Skies" – 3:34
12. "It's All Your Fault" – 2:36
13. "I Was Just Walkin' Out the Door" – 2:54

== Chart performance ==
Chart (2006)	Peak position
U.S. Billboard Top Country Albums	24
U.S. Billboard 200	114
