= It Always Will Be =

Studio album by Willie Nelson
- Released: October 26, 2004
- Genre: Country
- Label: Lost Highway
- Producer: James Stroud

Willie Nelson chronology
Nacogdoches (2004)	It Always Will Be (2004)	Countryman (2004)

It Always Will Be is the 52nd studio album by country singer Willie Nelson. It includes a cover of the Allman Brothers Band's "Midnight Rider," recorded here as a duet with Toby Keith. The cover was released as a single, but did not chart.

Professional ratings
Review scores
Source	Rating
AllMusic	3.5/5 stars

== Track listing ==
All songs written by Willie Nelson, except where noted.

1. "It Always Will Be" – 4:11
2. "Picture in a Frame" (Tom Waits, Kathleen Brennan) – 3:39
3. "The Way You See Me" (Rusty Adams, Jimmy Day) – 4:21
4. "Be That As It May" (Paula Nelson) (Duet with Paula Nelson) – 3:29
5. "You Were It" – 4:28
6. "Big Booty" (Sonny Throckmorton)– 3:03
7. "I Didn't Come Here (And I Ain't Leavin')" (Scotty Emerick, Michael Smotherman) – 3:10
8. "My Broken Heart Belongs to You" (David Anderson, Willie Nelson) – 2:26
9. "Dreams Come True" (J.C. Hopkins) (Duet with Norah Jones)– 4:35
10. "Over Time" (Lucinda Williams) (Duet with Lucinda Williams) – 3:45
11. "Tired" (Chuck Cannon, Toby Keith) – 4:19
12. "Love's the One and Only Thing" (Scotty Emerick, Dave Loggins) – 3:34
13. "Texas" – 3:55
14. "Midnight Rider" (Gregg Allman, Richard Payne) (Duet with Toby Keith) – 3:00

== Personnel ==
- Willie Nelson - guitar, acoustic guitar, vocals
- Eddie Bayers - drums
- Dan Dugmore - pedal steel
- Chris Dunn - horn
- Scotty Emerick - acoustic guitar
- Shannon Forrest - drums
- Paul Franklin - pedal steel
- Kenny Greenberg - electric guitar
- Wes Hightower - vocals
- Jim Horn - horn
- Clayton Ivey - piano, keyboards
- Amy James - vocals
- Sam Levine - horn
- Liana Manis - vocals
- Brent Mason - electric guitar
- Steve Nathan - piano, keyboards
- Steve Patrick - horn
- Mickey Raphael - harmonica
- Michael Rhodes - bass guitar
- Matt Rollings - piano, keyboards
- Biff Watson - acoustic guitar
- Glenn Worf - bass guitar

== Chart performance ==
Chart (2004)	Peak position
U.S. Billboard Top Country Albums	12
U.S. Billboard 200	75
