= Steve Chadie =

American audio engineer (born 1968)

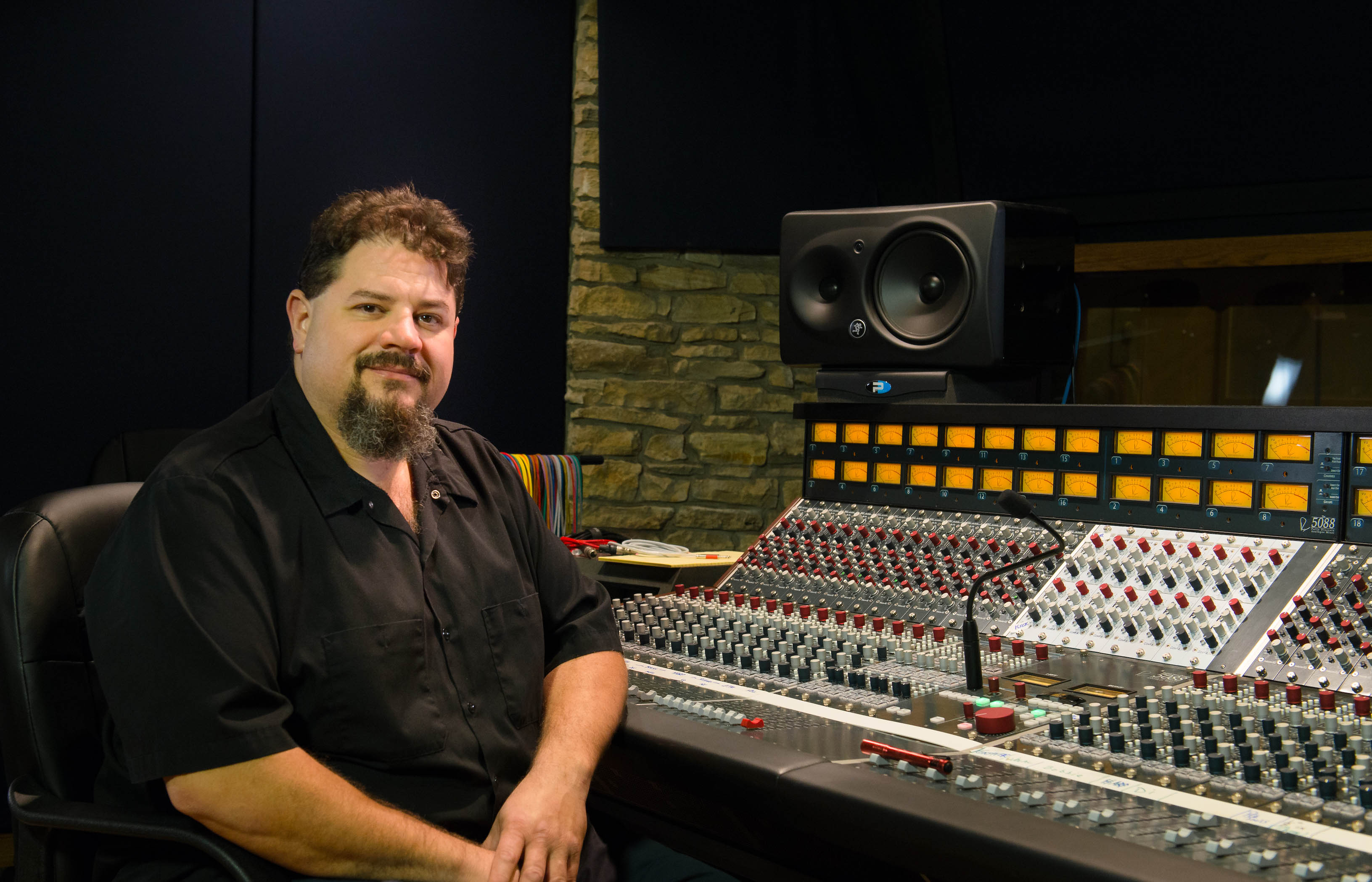
- Chadie on Rupert Neve Console

Background information
- Born: Stephen Michael Chadie; 2 May 1968 (age 58)
- Genres: Country music, rock, blues, reggae, folk music
- Occupation: Audio Engineer
- Instrument: guitar
- Years active: 1995 - present
- Labels: Sony Records, Universal Music Group, Lost Highway Records, MCA Nashville, Warner Music Group

Steve Chadie (born 2 May 1968) is an audio engineer who has worked extensively with Willie Nelson. His recordings with Nelson include vocals and guitar on “Last Man Standing”, “My Way” (for which he received a Grammy for Best Traditional Pop Vocal Album), “God’s Problem Child”, “Willie Nelson and The Boys”, and “Summertime-Willie Nelson sings Gershwin”. Other credits with Willie include tracking engineer on "Heroes”, "Let's Face The Music And Dance”, “Django And Jimmie” (Willie's collaboration with Merle Haggard in 2015) and mixing on "December Day", a collection of work he recorded with Willie and his sister Bobbie in between touring on impromptu sessions that date as far back as 2004. Steve has been awarded a double platinum record for Los Lonely Boys "Heaven" and was nominated for a grammy for the song "Heaven", as well. He has recorded and/or mixed five Los Lonely Boys records since their debut release. Other awards include a triple platinum record for work done on Sublime's "Sublime" and a platinum record for work on Hilary Duff's self titled recording "Hilary Duff", In addition he has been awarded a gold record for work done on Kenny Wayne Shepherd's "Live On" CD.

== Early years ==
Steve was born in Princeton, New Jersey and moved to Texas with his family in 1978. He studied music at University of North Texas for 3 years and finished a Bachelor of Music with a Major in Sound Recording Technology at Texas State University. He began his career as an intern at Willie Nelson's Pedernales Recording Studio in 1995, quickly working his way up to Assistant Engineer for Larry Greenhill. Upon Greenhill's departure he took on the position of Head Engineer, capitalizing on the learning opportunities presented while working alongside many incoming clients’ producers - including John Porter, Paul Leary and a recurring 14-year stint with legendary producer Andy Johns.

== Pedernales (1995–2012) ==
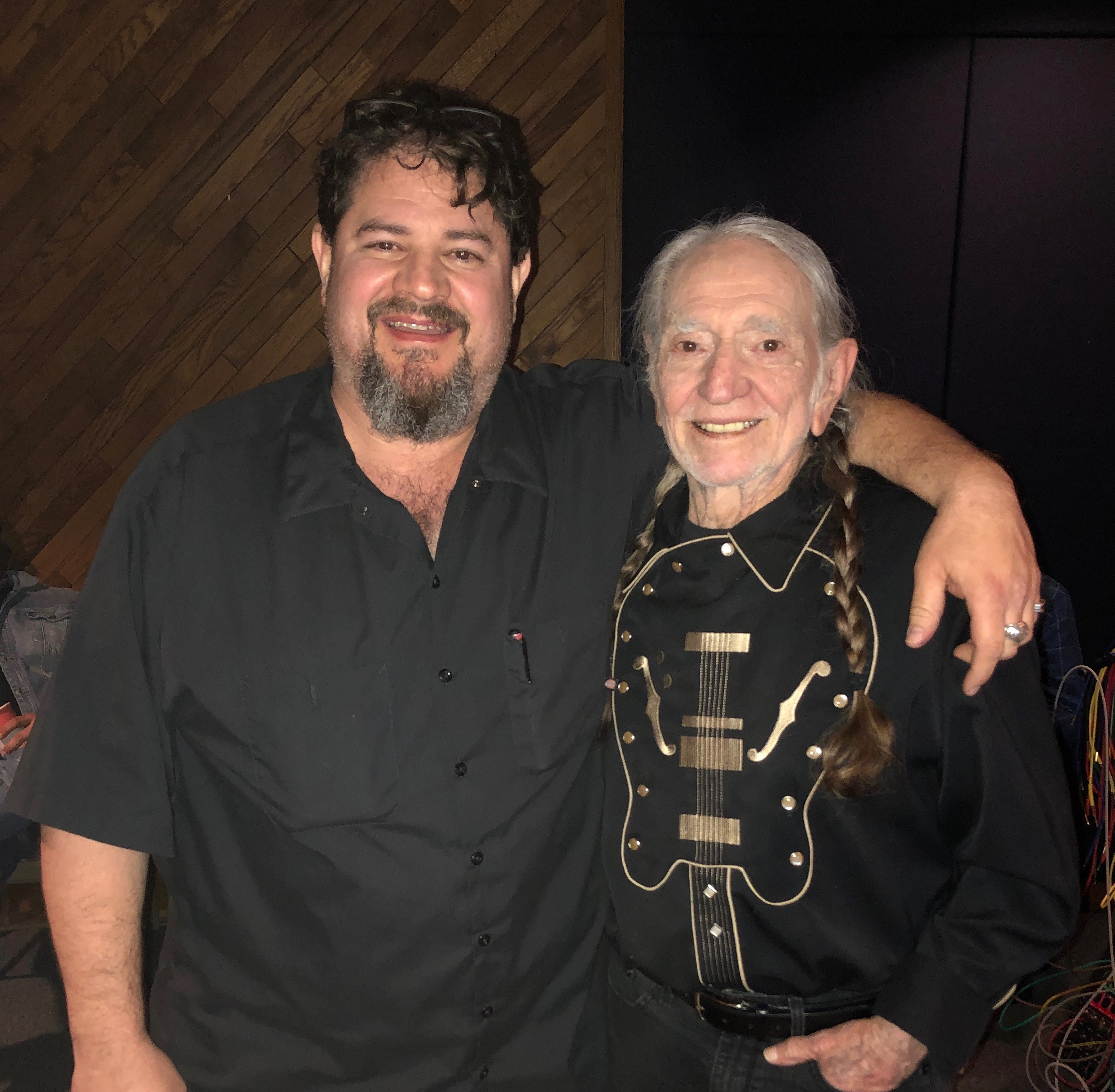
Steve Chadie and Wille Nelson

He stayed on at Pedernales until the doors closed commercially in 2012. He still records Willie Nelson at the facility, however, including vocals and guitar on “Last Man Standing”, “My Way” (for which he received a Grammy for Best Traditional Pop Vocal Album), “God’s Problem Child”, “Willie Nelson and The Boys”, and “Summertime -Willie Nelson sings Gershwin”.

== Recording History ==
In addition to his long tenure with Willie Nelson, Steve has worked with many notable artists, including Kacey Musgraves on A Very Kacey Christmas, Lukas Nelson & Promise of the Real, Meat Puppets, Kris Kristofferson, Wilco and Sheryl Crow.

== Awards ==
Steve has been awarded a double platinum record for Los Lonely Boys "Heaven" and was nominated for a Grammy for the song "Heaven", as well. He has recorded and/or mixed five Los Lonely Boys records since their debut release.

Other accolades include a triple platinum record for work done on Sublime's "Sublime" and a platinum record for work on Hilary Duff's self titled recording "Hilary Duff". In addition, he has been awarded a gold record for work done on Kenny Wayne Shepherd's "Live On" CD.

Most recently, Steve won a GRAMMY for his engineering work on Willie Nelson’s “A Beautiful Time” (2023 Country Music Album of the Year).
