= Trigger (guitar) =

Guitar owned by Willie Nelson

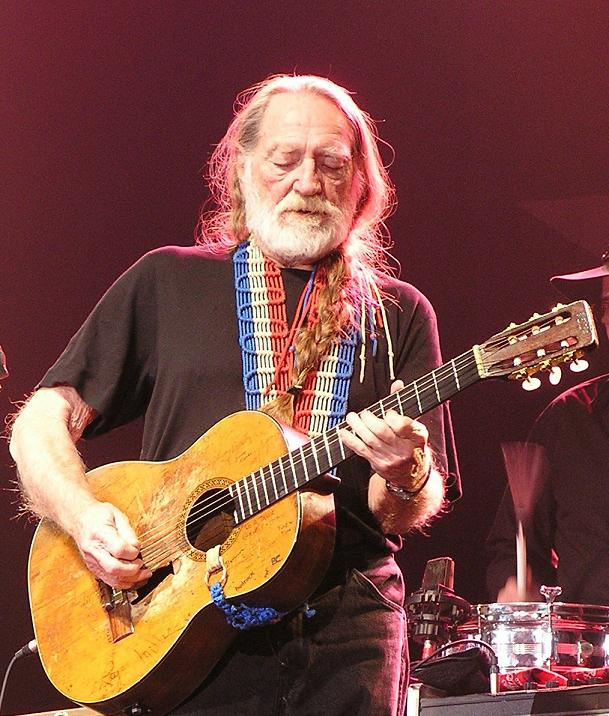
- Willie Nelson performing with Trigger in 2007
- Manufacturer: C. F. Martin & Company
- Period: 1969

Construction
- Body type: Classical Acoustic, Martin N-20
- Scale: 25.4 inches (650 mm)

Woods
- Body: Brazilian rosewood
- Neck: Mahogany
- Fretboard: Ebony

Hardware
- Bridge: Tied
- Pickup: Prismatone stereo

Trigger is a modified Martin N-20 nylon-string classical acoustic guitar used by country music singer-songwriter Willie Nelson. Early in his career, Nelson tested several guitars by different companies. After his Baldwin guitar was damaged in 1969, he purchased the Martin guitar, but retained the electrical components from the Baldwin guitar. He opted to amplify the acoustic guitar, resulting in his signature sound.

== Background ==
As Nelson was an RCA Records artist, several guitar manufacturers would either loan or give him their instruments to test them. Earlier in his career, Nelson played instruments of the Fender Musical Instruments Corporation, with models including the Stratocaster, Telecaster, Jaguar, and Jazzmaster. Nelson later moved on to Gibson guitars. In 1969, before a concert at Panamerican Ballroom near Houston, Texas, the Baldwin Company gave Nelson the 800C Classical Acoustic-Electric Guitar model with a Prismatone pickup and an amplifier to test.

== The Martin N-20 ==
In 1969, after a concert at Floore's Country Store in Helotes, Texas, a drunk man stepped on Nelson's Baldwin. David Zettner and Jimmy Day (members of Nelson's band The Record Men) took the guitar to Shot Jackson, a luthier in Nashville, Tennessee. Jackson considered the damage irreparable and offered Nelson a Martin N-20 nylon-stringed classical guitar made out of Brazilian rosewood with a Sitka spruce top (serial number 242830). Nelson instructed Jackson, during a phone conversation, to move the pickup from the Baldwin to the Martin. The pickup allowed him to amplify his classical acoustic sound to perform in large dance halls, contributing to his signature style. Nelson bought the modified Martin N-20 unseen, for $750 (equivalent to $6,400 in 2024). Two decades later, he named it after Roy Rogers' horse "Trigger". When asked about the name, Nelson often replies: "Roy Rogers had a horse named Trigger. I figured, this is my horse!" Nelson desired approaching the playing style and sound of jazz musician Django Reinhardt.

Nelson first used Trigger during the studio recordings of My Own Peculiar Way the same year, but the sound of the guitar was obscured by the dubbing of strings and brass instruments on the mix. The following year, Nelson saved Trigger from his burning ranch in Bandera, Texas. After Nelson's move to Austin, Texas and the revitalization of his music, Trigger defined his sound. The singer used Trigger in the recording of his acclaimed albums Shotgun Willie, Red Headed Stranger and Stardust.

== Appearance ==
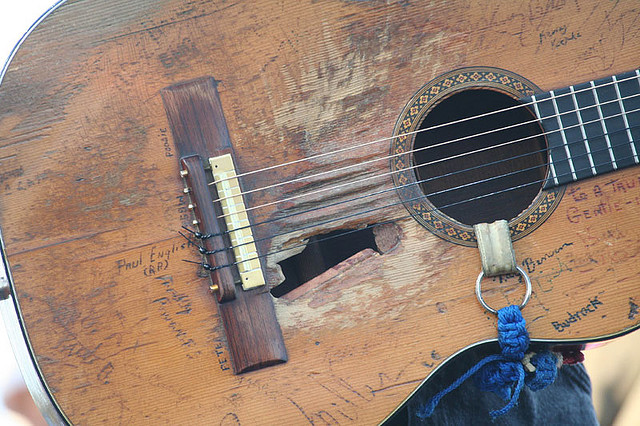
Willie Nelson's guitar, "Trigger"

Over time, Nelson has worn a large hole above the bridge, nearly reaching the sound hole. While classical guitars are meant to be played with finger-style picking, Nelson's use of a flatpick, and constant strumming, causes damage as the pick slowly scrapes away at the wood. Trigger's steel frets have been worn down from smooth ridges to wavy lines from the fretting of nylon strings over more than 10,000 performances.

Trigger's soundboard has been signed by over a hundred of Nelson's friends, associates, fellow musicians, lawyers and football coaches. The first signature was Leon Russell's, who had asked Nelson to sign his guitar. When Nelson was about to sign Russell's guitar with a marker, Russell asked him to instead scratch it, explaining that the guitar would be more valuable in the future. Interested in the concept, Nelson requested that Russell then sign Trigger.

== Maintenance ==
Luthier Mark Erlewine has been doing maintenance and repairs on Trigger since 1977, after meeting Nelson at a bar. The guitar goes to Erlewine once a year for an annual "check-up" in Austin, Texas. For 40 years, Trigger was prepared for Nelson before each show by his guitar technician "Tunin' Tom" Hawkins. Hawkins died in February 2026.

== Legacy ==
During his process with the IRS in 1991, Nelson was worried that Trigger could be auctioned off, stating: "When Trigger goes, I'll quit". He asked his daughter, Lana, to take the guitar from the studio before any IRS agent got there, and bring it to him in Maui. Nelson's attorney, Joel Katz, then hid the guitar in his house until the singer's debt was paid off in 1993.

In his book, The Tao of Willie: A Guide to Happiness in Your Heart, Nelson described the influence of the guitar in his style: "One of the secrets to my sound is almost beyond explanation. My battered old Martin guitar, Trigger, has the greatest tone I've ever heard from a guitar. ... If I picked up the finest guitar made this year and tried to play my solos exactly the way you heard them on the radio or even at last night's show, I'd always be a copy of myself and we'd all end up bored. But if I play an instrument that is now a part of me, and do it according to the way that feels right for me ... I'll always be an original".

In 2015, Rolling Stone Films presented a documentary, Mastering the Craft: Trigger, which depicts the story of the guitar. Directed by David Chamberlin and narrated by Woody Harrelson, the film features interviews with Nelson, his biographer Joe Nick Patoski, harmonicist Mickey Raphael, and singer Jerry Jeff Walker.

Due to Trigger's impact within the music industry, Martin Guitars produced the Willie Nelson Limited Edition N-20WN in 1998.

== See also ==
- List of guitars
