= One Hell of a Ride =

Box set by Willie Nelson
- Released: April 1, 2008
- Recorded: 1954–2007
- Genre: Country
- Labels: Columbia, Legacy

Willie Nelson chronology
16 Biggest Hits, Volume II (2007)	One Hell of a Ride (2008)	Playlist: The Very Best of Willie Nelson (2008)

Professional ratings
Review scores
Source	Rating
Allmusic	5/5 stars

One Hell of a Ride is a four-disc box set by American country singer Willie Nelson, released on April 1, 2008 by Columbia and Legacy Recordings. The 100-track collection covers recordings made between 1954 and 2007, was released in connection with Nelson's 75th birthday. It includes material from different periods of his career and several record labels.

== Background and content ==
One Hell of a Ride was conceived as a career-spanning retrospective. Its selections range from Nelson 's early recordings for small Texas labels through his recordings for Liberty, RCA, Atlantic, Columbia, Island, and other labels. The collection includes compositions written by Nelson, interpretations of songs by other songwriters, live recordings and collaborations with artist including Waylon Jennings, Merle Haggard, Ray Charles and Julio Iglesias,

The compilation was produces by AI Quaglieri and mastered by Joseph M.

== Critical reception ==
Stephen Thomas Erlewine of AllMusic described the collection as one of the most comprehensive overviews of Nelson's career, noting its combination of well-known recordings, concert standards and less familiar material. He also noted that the collection traces Nelson's work from his later Island and Mercury.

Writing for Pitchfork, Stephen M. Deusner noted the scoped of the 100-track collection and its coverage of more than five decades of Nelson's career. Deusner also highlighted the set's attention to Nelson's songwriting, interpretations of other composers' work and numerous collaborations.

Joel Selvin of the San Francisco Chronicle described the set as an overview of Nelson's career across several record labels and noted its inclusion of major recordings, duets and early demo that Nelson re-recorded for the collection.

== Chart performance ==
In the United Kingdom, One Hell of a Ride reached number five on the Official Country Compilation Chart and remained on the chart for seven weeks.

== Track listing ==
=== Disc one ===
1. "When I've Sang My Last Hillbilly Song" – 1:30
2. "No Place for Me" – 1:20
3. "Man With the Blues" – 2:07
4. "Nite Life" – 2:32
5. "Hello Walls" – 2:25
6. "Funny How Time Slips Away" – 3:04
7. "Crazy" – 2:53
8. "Half a Man" – 2:27
9. "Mr. Record Man" – 2:41
10. "One in a Row" – 2:34
11. "The Party's Over" – 2:26
12. "Texas in My Soul" – 2:02
13. "Good Times" – 2:29
14. "Sweet Memories" – 3:51
15. "Little Things" – 3:19
16. "Any Old Arms Won't Do" – 2:33
17. "Everybody's Talkin'" – 3:25
18. "Pins and Needles (In My Heart)" – 3:20
19. "Once More with Feeling" – 2:39
20. "I Gotta Get Drunk" – 2:51
21. "Laying My Burdens Down" – 2:39
22. "What Can You Do to Me Now" – 3:29
23. "Kneel at the Feet of Jesus" – 2:48
24. "I'm a Memory" – 2:26
25. "Family Bible" – 3:13
26. "Summer of Roses" – 2:07
27. "Yesterday's Wine" – 3:14
28. "Me and Paul" – 3:15
29. "The Words Don't Fit the Picture" – 2:46

=== Disc two ===
1. "Good Hearted Woman" (w/ Waylon Jennings) – 2:59
2. "You Left a Long, Long Time Ago" – 2:41
3. "She's Not for You" – 2:32
4. "You Ought to Hear Me Cry" – 2:42
5. "It Should Be Easier Now" – 2:47
6. "Mammas Don't Let Your Babies Grow Up to Be Cowboys" (w/ Waylon Jennings) – 3:28
7. "If You Can't Touch Her At All" (w/ Waylon Jennings) – 3:04
8. "I Can Get Off On You" (w/ Waylon Jennings) – 2:25
9. "Blackjack County Chain" – 2:03
10. "Johnny One Time" – 2:45
11. "Bring Me Sunshine" – 2:31
12. "I Just Can't Let You Say Goodbye" – 2:46
13. "Shotgun Willie" – 2:44
14. "Sad Songs and Waltzes" – 3:08
15. "The Troublemaker" – 1:53
16. "Uncloudy Day" – 4:41
17. "Bloody Mary Morning" – 2:15
18. "I Still Can't Believe You're Gone" – 4:20
19. "Blue Eyes Crying in the Rain" – 2:12
20. "I'd Have To Be Crazy" – 3:27
21. "If You've Got the Money I've Got the Time" – 2:06
22. "Always Late (With Your Kisses)" – 2:26
23. "She's Gone, Gone, Gone" – 2:32
24. "I Never Go Around Mirrors" – 2:37
25. "Stardust" – 3:53
26. "Georgia on My Mind" – 4:12

=== Disc three ===
1. "Whiskey River" (Live, April 1978) – 3:34
2. "Till I Gain Control Again" (Live, April 1978) – 5:53
3. "Stay a Little Longer" (Live, April 1978) – 3:28
4. "Heartbreak Hotel" (w/ Leon Russell) – 3:02
5. "One For My Baby (And One More For The Road)" (w/ Leon Russell) – 2:36
6. "Help Me Make It Through the Night" – 4:01
7. "My Heroes Have Always Been Cowboys" – 3:07
8. "Crazy Arms" – 2:44
9. "On the Road Again" – 2:35
10. "Angel Flying Too Close to the Ground" – 4:30
11. "Mona Lisa" – 2:33
12. "I'm Gonna Sit Right Down and Write Myself a Letter" – 3:02
13. "Always on My Mind" – 3:34
14. "Pancho and Lefty" (w/ Merle Haggard) – 4:49
15. "Reasons to Quit" – 3:33
16. "In the Jailhouse Now" – 2:09
17. "Why Do I Have to Choose" – 3:31
18. "City of New Orleans" – 4:52
19. "To All the Girls I've Loved Before" (w/ Julio Igelsias) – 3:34
20. "Three Days" – 3:30

=== Disc four ===
1. "Write Your Own Songs" – 3:20
2. "Seven Spanish Angels" (w/ Ray Charles) – 3:50
3. "Highwayman" (w/ Johnny Cash; Kris Kristofferson; Waylon Jennings) – 3:03
4. "Living in the Promiseland" – 3:23
5. "What a Wonderful World" – 2:46
6. "Country Willie" – 3:47
7. "Graceland" – 4:47
8. "Valentine" – 3:38
9. "What Was It You Wanted" – 5:27
10. "Still Is Still Moving to Me" – 3:33
11. "Too Sick to Pray" – 2:43
12. "Everywhere I Go" (w/ Emmylou Harris) – 3:53
13. "My Own Peculiar Way" – 3:40
14. "Nuages" – 3:41
15. "Rainbow Connection" – 4:32
16. "Mendocino County Line" (w/ Lee Ann Womack) – 4:34
17. "The Harder They Come" (w/ Toots & The Maytals) – 3:39
18. "Bubbles in My Beer" – 2:51
19. "When I've Sung My Last Hillbilly Song" – 3:27

== Charts ==
Chart (2008)	Peak position
U.S. Billboard Top Country Albums	46

== Personnel ==
- Willie Nelson – guitar, vocals
