= Two Braids & the Truth =

Two Braids & The Truth

Studio album by Ty Myers
- Released: September 18, 2026
- Genre: Country
- Length: 34:02
- Labels: Records; Columbia Nashville
- Producer: Brandon Hood

Ty Myers chronology
Heavy on the Soul (2026)	Two Braids & The Truth (2026)

Two Braids & The Truth is the third studio album by American singer-songwriter and musician Ty Myers. The album was released on September 18, 2026, via Records/Columbia Nashville and follows his second album Heavy on the Soul which was released earlier in the year. Produced by Brandon Hood, the album is a tribute to Willie Nelson and features ten tracks, all of which were either written by or are closely associated with Nelson, who was a major influence on Myers' artistry. It was preceded by the single "Always on My Mind", a duet with Carter Faith, and also features guest appearances from Ben Haggard, son of Nelson's frequent collaborator Merle Haggard, and from Nelson himself.

== Background ==
Myers announced his second album, Heavy on the Soul on January 13, 2026 and released it two months later on March 27. To promote it, Myers opened up for Luke Combs on his My Kinda Saturday Night Tour from March to August 2026 and his own Legal Tour from June to November 2026. On August 19, it was revealed that Myers would also be the opening act for two co-headlining shows by Nelson and Neil Young on September 22 and 24.

On August 21, 2026, Myers released his cover of "Always On My Mind" with Carter Faith. "Two Braids & The Truth" was surprise-announced by Myers on his Instagram on September 10, 2026, with a release date of the following week. In a statement accompanying the announcement, which also included a picture of him and Nelson, he wrote, "this album is a collection of Willie Nelson songs that have made an impact in my songwriting, love for music and embodies what it means to be a Texan. Willie’s songs have played a huge role in every phase, of not just my music but my life, and I hope this album does him justice. I am honored to have made an album to tribute a true Texas icon and will hold these songs close to my heart forever".

== Track listing ==
All tracks are written by Willie Nelson, except where noted.

Two Braids & The Truth track listing
No.	Title	Writer(s)	Length
1.	"Bloody Mary Morning"		2:48
2.	"Write Your Own Song" (featuring Willie Nelson)		3:21
3.	"Me and Paul"		4:00
4.	"Shotgun Willie"		2:42
5.	"My Heroes Have Always Been Cowboys" (featuring Ben Haggard)	Sharon M. Vaughn	2:48
6.	"Whiskey River"	Johnny Bush	3:49
7.	"Angel Flying Too Close to the Ground"		4:05
8.	"Always on My Mind" (featuring Carter Faith)	Wayne Carson; John Christopher; Mark James	3:49
9.	"Night Life"	Walt Breeland; Paul Buskirk; Nelson	3:30
10.	"I'll Fly Away"	Albert E. Brumley	3:07
Total length:			34:02

== Personnel ==
Credits adapted from Tidal.

- Roy Agee - trombone
- David Angell - violin
- Kevin Bate - cello
- Bruce Bouton - steel guitar, dobro
- Tom Bukovac - electric guitar
- Evan Cobb - saxophone
- Eric Darken - percussion
- Kris Donegan - electric guitar
- Rachel Englander - violin
- Carter Faith - vocals
- Chris Farrell - viola
- Ben Haggard - vocals
- Mark Hill - bass
- Brandon Hood - acoustic guitar, electric guitar, gut string guitar, slide guitar
- Trey Keller - backing vocals
- Anneliese Kowert - violin
- Tim Lauer - horn
- Gale Mayes - backing vocals
- Chris McHugh - drums
- Gordon Mote - keyboards
- Ty Myers - vocals
- Willie Nelson - vocals
- Angie Primm - backing vocals
- Rob Quallich - trumpet
- Mickey Raphael - harmonica
- Jung Min Shin - violin
- Kris Wilkinson - strings, viola
