= Revolutions of Time...The Journey 1975/1993 =

Box set by Willie Nelson
- Released: November 14, 1995
- Recorded: February 9, 1975 – November 10, 1992
- Genre: Country
- Length: 198:13
- Label: Columbia, Legacy

Willie Nelson chronology
Super Hits, Volume 2 (1995)	Revolutions of Time...The Journey 1975/1993 (1995)	16 Biggest Hits (1998)

Professional ratings
Review scores
Source	Rating
Allmusic	4.5/5 stars

Revolutions of Time...The Journey 1975/1993 is a three-disc box set by country singer Willie Nelson, released on November 14, 1995. It features recordings made for his 1975 album "Red Headed Stranger" through his 1993 album "Across the Borderline".

== Track listing ==
=== Disc one ===
1. Time of the Preacher – 2:28
2. Blue Eyes Crying in the Rain – 2:20
3. If You've Got the Money (I've Got the Time) – 2:05
4. Uncloudy Day – 4:41
5. Always Late (With Your Kisses) – 2:26
6. Georgia on My Mind – 4:20
7. Blue Skies – 3:34
8. Whiskey River – 3:33
9. Stay All Night (Stay a Little Longer) – 3:25
10. Mr. Record Man – 2:01
11. Loving Her Was Easier (Than Anything I'll Ever Do Again) – 5:51
12. Mammas Don't Let Your Babies Grow Up to Be Cowboys – :28
13. My Heroes Have Always Been Cowboys – 3:05
14. It's Not Supposed to Be That Way – 3:23
15. On the Road Again – 2:34
16. Angel Flying Too Close to the Ground – 4:26
17. Mona Lisa – 2:32
18. Always on My Mind – 3:33
19. Last Thing I Needed First Thing This Morning – 4:20
20. The Party's Over – 2:48

=== Disc two ===
1. Summertime (with Leon Russell) – 2:28
2. Faded Love (with Ray Price) – 3:50
3. Night Life (with Ray Price) – 4:05
4. Pancho and Lefty (with Merle Haggard) – 4:48
5. Old Friends (with Roger Miller and Ray Price) – 3:07
6. In the Jailhouse Now (with Webb Pierce) – 2:08
7. Everything's Beautiful (In Its Own Way) (with Dolly Parton) – 3:15
8. Take It to the Limit (with Waylon Jennings) – 3:50
9. To All the Girls I've Loved Before (with Julio Iglesias) – 3:33
10. How Do You Feel About Foolin' Around (with Kris Kristofferson) – 2:45
11. Seven Spanish Angels (with Ray Charles) – 3:51
12. Hello Walls (with Faron Young) – 2:31
13. I'm Movin' On (with Hank Snow) – 2:45
14. Highwayman (with The Highwaymen) – 3:03
15. Slow Movin' Outlaw (with Lacy J. Dalton) – 3:34
16. Are There Any More Real Cowboys? (with Neil Young) – 3:02
17. They All Went To Mexico (with Carlos Santana) – 4:46
18. Half a Man (with George Jones) – 3:04
19. Texas on a Saturday Night (with Mel Tillis) – 2:40
20. Heartland (with Bob Dylan) – 4:30

=== Disc three ===
1. Nobody Slides, My Friend – 1:43
2. Little Old Fashioned Karma – 3:20
3. Harbor Lights – 3:48
4. Without a Song – 3:51
5. Good Time Charlie's Got the Blues – 2:55
6. City of New Orleans – 4:51
7. Who'll Buy My Memories? – 3:33
8. Write Your Own Songs – 3:18
9. Forgiving You Was Easy – 2:48
10. Me and Paul – 2:51
11. When I Dream – 3:31
12. My Own Peculiar Way – 2:54
13. Living in the Promiseland – 3:21
14. There Is No Easy Way (But There Is a Way) – 2:33
15. Ole Buttermilk Sky – 2:51
16. A Horse Called Music – 4:25
17. Nothing I Can Do About It Now – 3:18
18. Is the Better Part Over – 3:32
19. Ain't Necessarily So – 3:05
20. Still Is Still Moving to Me – 3:29

== Personnel ==
- Willie Nelson – Guitar, vocals
