= Legend: The Best of Willie Nelson =

Compilation album by Willie Nelson
- Released: May 5, 2008
- Genre: Country, Folk
- Label: RCA records

Willie Nelson chronology
| Playlist: The Very Best of Willie Nelson (2008) | Legend: The Best of Willie Nelson (2008) | Naked Willie (2009) |

Professional ratings
Review scores
| Source | Rating |
|---|---|
| AllMusic | 4/5 stars |

Legend: The Best of Willie Nelson is a compilation album by country singer Willie Nelson, released on May 5, 2008.

== Track listing ==
1. "On the Road Again"
2. "To All the Girls I've Loved Before" (w/ Julio Iglesias)
3. "Crazy"
4. "City of New Orleans"
5. "Blue Eyes Crying in the Rain"
6. "Always on My Mind"
7. "Me and Paul"
8. "Good Hearted Woman" (w/ Waylon Jennings)
9. "Night Life"
10. "Georgia on My Mind"
11. "My Heroes Have Always Been Cowboys"
12. "Pancho and Lefty" (w/ Merle Haggard)
13. "Funny How Time Slips Away"
14. "Hello Walls"
15. "Highwayman" (w/ Johnny Cash; Kris Kristoferson; Waylon Jennings)
16. "Blue Skies"
17. "Mammas Don't Let Your Babies Grow Up to Be Cowboys" (w/ Waylon Jennings)
18. "Whiskey River" (Live, April 1978)
19. "Seven Spanish Angels" (w/ Ray Charles)
20. "Bloody Mary Morning"

== Personnel ==
- Willie Nelson - Guitar, Vocals

== Chart performance ==
The album debuted on the UK album chart at No. 16 with 7,829 copies sold for the week.

| Chart (2008) | Peak position |
|---|---|
| New Zealand Albums Chart | 3 |
| Danish Albums Chart | 3 |
| U.K. Albums Chart | 16 |
| Irish Albums Chart | 31 |
| Australian Albums Chart | 49 |
| Dutch Albums Chart | 66 |
| European Albums Chart | 86 |

=== Certifications ===
| Country | Provider | Certification |
|---|---|---|
| New Zealand | RIANZ | Gold |
| UK | BPI | Gold |
