= 16 Biggest Hits (Willie Nelson album) =

Greatest hits album by Willie Nelson
- Released: July 14, 1998
- Recorded: February 9, 1975 – February 2, 1989
- Genre: Country
- Length: 54:41
- Labels: Columbia, Legacy
- Producers: Willie Nelson, Sydney Pollack, Chips Moman, Booker T. Jones III

Willie Nelson chronology
Revolutions of Time...The Journey 1975/1993 (1995)	16 Biggest Hits (1998)	Good Ol' Country Singin' (2000)

Professional ratings
Review scores
Source	Rating
Allmusic	4/5 stars

16 Biggest Hits is a compilation album by country singer Willie Nelson. It was released on July 14, 1998.

The album was certified Platinum in 2002 by the RIAA. It has sold 1,852,000 copies in the US as of May 2013.

== Track listing ==
All tracks are written by Willie Nelson, unless otherwise noted.

No.	Title	Writer(s)	Original Album	Length
1.	"Blue Eyes Crying in the Rain"	Fred Rose	Red Headed Stranger (1975)	2:20
2.	"If You've Got the Money, I've Got the Time"	Lefty Frizzell; Jimmy Beck	The Sound in Your Mind (1976)	2:03
3.	"Georgia on My Mind"	Hoagy Carmichael; Stuart Gorrell	Stardust (1978)	4:19
4.	"Blue Skies"	Irving Berlin	Stardust	3:34
5.	"My Heroes Have Always Been Cowboys"	Sharon Vaughn	The Electric Horseman (1979)	3:03
6.	"On the Road Again"		Honeysuckle Rose (1980)	2:33
7.	"Always on My Mind"	Mark James; Johnny Christopher; Wayne Carson	Always on My Mind (1982)	3:33
8.	"City of New Orleans"	Steve Goodman	City of New Orleans (1984)	4:49
9.	"Forgiving You Was Easy"		Me & Paul (1985)	2:47
10.	"Living in the Promiseland"	David Lynn Jones	The Promiseland (1986)	3:20
11.	"Midnight Rider"	Gregg Allman; Robert Kim Payne	The Electric Horseman	2:50
12.	"Remember Me (When the Candlelights Are Gleaming)"	Scotty Wiseman	Red Headed Stranger	2:50
13.	"Uncloudy Day"		The Troublemaker (1976)	4:39
14.	"Angel Flying Too Close to the Ground"		Honeysuckle Rose	4:24
15.	"Last Thing I Needed First Thing This Morning"	Gary P. Nunn; Donna Farar	Always on My Mind	4:20
16.	"Nothing I Can Do About It Now"	Beth Nielsen Chapman	A Horse Called Music (1989)	3:17
Total length:				54:41

== Chart performance ==
16 Biggest Hits peaked at #29 on the U.S. Billboard Top Country Albums chart the week of July 3, 1999.

=== Weekly charts ===
Chart (1998–1999)	Peak position
US Top Country Albums (Billboard)	29

=== Year-end charts ===
Chart (1999)	Position
US Top Country Albums (Billboard)	59
