= Tougher Than Leather (Willie Nelson album) =

Studio album by Willie Nelson
- Released: 1983
- Studio: Pedernales Recording (Spicewood, Texas)
- Genre: Country
- Length: 33:40
- Label: Columbia
- Producer: Willie Nelson, Bee Spears

Willie Nelson chronology
The Winning Hand (1982)	Tougher Than Leather (1983)	Without a Song (1983)

Singles from Tougher Than Leather
- 1. "Little Old Fashioned Karma" Released: March 12, 1983

Tougher Than Leather is the 28th studio album by country singer Willie Nelson. It was his first album of original material since Red Headed Stranger eight years before.

== Reception ==
Professional ratings
Review scores
Source	Rating
Allmusic	2.5/5 stars

Crispin Sartwell of Record panned the album, calling it "country music in name only." He elaborated that whereas Nelson's earlier songs were honest ballads about concrete situations which listeners could relate to, Tougher Than Leather is built around high-handed philosophical preaching. He also criticized the lack of variety in the music, describing it as "utterly bland and homogeneous."

Stephen Thomas Erlewine of Allmusic gave the album a mixed review, saying the performance by Nelson's touring band was "robust" yet many of the songs were mediocre and "the album simply doesn't hold together thematically".

== Track listing ==
All tracks composed by Willie Nelson, except where indicated

1. "My Love for the Rose" - 0:37
2. "Changing Skies" - 3:03
3. "Tougher Than Leather" - 4:53
4. "Little Old Fashioned Karma" - 3:18
5. "Somewhere in Texas (Part I)" - 0:53
6. "The Beer Barrel Polka" (Traditional, arranged and played by Bobbie Nelson) - 2:43
7. "Summer of Roses" - 3:12
8. "Somewhere in Texas (Part II)" - 0:55
9. "My Love for the Rose" - 0:37
10. "The Convict and the Rose" (Robert King, Ballard MacDonald) - 3:52
11. "Changing Skies" - 0:54
12. "I Am the Forest" - 4:17
13. "Nobody Slides, My Friend" - 1:39

== Personnel ==
- Willie Nelson - guitar, arranger, vocals
- Grady Martin - guitar
- Jody Payne - guitar
- Bee Spears - bass guitar
- Paul English - drums
- Bobbie Nelson - piano
- Johnny Gimble - fiddle, mandolin
- Mickey Raphael - harmonica

== Chart performance ==
Chart (1983)	Peak position
U.S. Billboard Top Country Albums	4
U.S. Billboard 200	39
Canadian RPM Top Albums	48
