= Night and Day (Willie Nelson album) =

Studio album by Willie Nelson
- Released: July 13, 1999
- Genre: Jazz
- Label: Pedernales/FreeFall

Willie Nelson chronology
Teatro (1998)	Night and Day (1999)	Me and the Drummer (2000)

Professional ratings
Review scores
Source	Rating
AllMusic	4/5 stars
Robert Christgau	A
The Encyclopedia of Popular Music	2/5 stars
Rolling Stone	3/5 stars

Night and Day is the 46th album by the country musician Willie Nelson, released in 1999. It is an instrumental album.

The title track was nominated for a Grammy Award, in the "Best Pop Instrumental Performance" category.

== Production ==
Johnny Gimble played fiddle on several of the album's tracks.

== Critical reception ==
Robert Christgau thought that "even simpatico analogies—early string bands, the looser Western swing units, the relaxation Merle Haggard's guys go for, or for that matter Django Reinhardt—don't suggest the casual musicality this long-running off-and-on octet achieves without apparent effort every time it sits down." The Hartford Courant opined that "the closest comparison of Night and Day is The Buena Vista Social Club, not in style so much but the deft, understated joy in the playing."

AllMusic wrote: "Night and Day isn't a hard bop blowing date; fusing pre-swing jazz with country and pop, Nelson draws on such influences as Django Reinhardt and Stephane Grappelli and favors lyricism that is melodic, straightforward, and uncomplicated." The Star Tribune called the album proof that Nelson is "one of the most soulful guitarists ever."

== Track listing ==
1. "Vous et Moi" - 4:12
2. "Nuages" - 3:39
3. "Night and Day" - 4:32
4. "All the Things You Are" - 2:31
5. "Sweet Georgia Brown" - 3:39
6. "Gypsy" - 3:10
7. "Honeysuckle Rose" - 3:33
8. "Over the Waves" - 4:03
9. "September in the Rain" - 3:20
10. "Bandera" - 2:43

The original sequencing of the songs was somewhat different. The back cover of the CD featured the original track listing with a sticker over it to show the "sequence revision". Some sources, including www.willienelson.com, still show the original, incorrect sequence. That sequence was:

1. Vous et Moi
2. Nuages
3. Night and Day
4. Over the Waves
5. All the Things You Are
6. Sweet Georgia Brown
7. September in the Rain
8. Gypsy
9. Honeysuckle Rose
10. Bandera

== Personnel ==
- Willie Nelson - guitar
- Paul English - drums
- Johnny Gimble - fiddle, mandolin
- Jody Payne - acoustic guitar
- Mickey Raphael - harmonica
- Bee Spears - bass guitar
- Bobbie Nelson - piano
- Billy English - percussion
