= Phases and Stages =

Studio album by Willie Nelson
- Released: March 1974
- Recorded: 1973
- Studio: Muscle Shoals (Sheffield, Alabama)
- Genre: Country; outlaw country
- Length: 34:12
- Label: Atlantic
- Producer: Jerry Wexler

Willie Nelson chronology
Shotgun Willie (1973)	Phases and Stages (1974)	Red Headed Stranger (1975)

Phases and Stages is the 17th studio album by American country music singer-songwriter Willie Nelson, released in March 1974. It followed the moderate success of his first Atlantic Records release, Shotgun Willie. Nelson met producer Jerry Wexler at a party where Nelson sang songs from an album he planned to record. The single "Phases and Stages" was originally recorded the same year. Nelson recorded the album at Muscle Shoals Sound Studios in two days and Wexler produced it.

The album narrates the story of a divorce. Side one tells the woman's story and side two the man's. The album peaked at number 34 on Billboard's Top Country Albums and the single "Bloody Mary Morning" reached number 17 on Billboard's Country singles. Despite the chart positions attained by the album, and its singles, Atlantic Records closed their Country music division in September 1974.

== Background and recording ==
In 1972, Nelson signed a recording contract with the newly created Country Music division of Atlantic Records. Producer Jerry Wexler gave Nelson greater creative control than his contract with RCA Records offered him. Nelson met Wexler at a party in Harlan Howard's house, where he sang the songs he wrote for an album. Howard later remembered, “He got on the stool late at night when the party had thinned out, and he sang like a total album with a gut string and a stool". As Nelson's performance progressed, Howard noted that Wexler "flipped out" with the material.

Nelson was excited at the prospect of using his own band, something RCA Records had not allowed him to do previously. Nelson’s road band consisted of Paul English on drums, Bee Spears on bass, Mickey Raphael on harmonica, and Bobbie Nelson on piano. Nelson recorded his first album for Atlantic Records, Shotgun Willie, in 1972. Produced by Arif Mardin and Wexler, Shotgun Willie marked a change of style in Nelson's music. Nelson stated that recording the album had "...cleared his throat".

A single containing the song "Phases and Stages" was first released in 1972. Wexler proposed Nelson to record the new album at Muscle Shoals Sound Studio in Alabama. Wexler desired to record the album with a rhythm and blues section instead of using Nelson's band. Nelson accepted Wexler's suggestion since he considered that the producer allowed him total control on the sessions for Shotgun Willie. In 1973, Nelson recorded the songs in two days with musicians Fred Carter Jr., David Hood, Barry Beckett, Jimmy Johnson, Pete Carr and Roger Hawkins.

Atlantic Records's executives criticized Wexler's decision to record in Muscle Shoals instead of Nashville. Upon his return to Nashville, Nelson heard the tapes of his Muscle Shoals sessions. Unsure with the results, he decided to record the album again with his own band. Atlantic Records’ Nashville A&R executive Rick Sanjek supported Nelson's decision. Sanjek booked Fred Carter Jr's Nugget Studios in Goodlettsville, Tennessee for the new sessions. Sanjek took the finished product to New York to discuss the recordings with an unaware Wexler. Enraged by Sanjek and his proposal, Wexler denied to replace the Muscle Shoals recordings, while he deemed the new sessions "the most horrible piece of shit you ever heard". The following week, Wexler fired Sanjek and requested Atlantic engineer Tom Dowd to do the final mix.

== Content ==
"Phases and Stages (theme)"
Frequently repeated along the album, the song appears at the beginning of some of the tracks and at the end of the record.

"Pretend I Never Happened"
On the first side of the album, the song depicts the woman leaving her house and encouraging her husband to find a new love.

"Bloody Mary Morning"
Starting the second side of the album, the song depicts the husband's surprise in front of her wife leaving the house and him taking a plane to Houston, Texas.

The theme of the songs centers on divorce, narrated from both viewpoints. That of the woman is narrated on side one; while the man's is on side two. The recurrent song "Phases and Stages" is repeated throughout the album, introducing several other songs. The album begins with "Phases and Stages/Washing the Dishes", with the woman tired of caring for her unfaithful husband, emphasizing her domestic chores. This is followed by "Phases and Stages/Walkin'" where, after consideration, she leaves her husband at night, saying "Walkin' is better than runnin' away, and crawlin' ain't no good at all". In "Pretend I Never Happened", she advises him to forget her and continue with his life. In "Sister's Coming Home/Down at the Corner Beer Joint", her younger sister describes the woman moving back home and sleeping late. Eventually, she overcomes her grief and begins a social life at the corner beer joint, representing her liberation with the lyrics "(she's) dancin' on a hardwood floor, her jeans fit a little bit tighter than they did before". The final song of side one depicts the woman falling in love again but reluctant to admit it because she fears that her story will be repeated.

The second side of the album begins with "Bloody Mary Morning", with the male narrator ordering drinks on a flight from Los Angeles, California to Houston, Texas after his wife unexpectedly left him, with "the smog and haze reminding me of how I feel". In "Phases and Stages/No Love Around" he recalls dragging in at sunrise after another night of carousing: "I come home last Saturday morning, I come home and found you gone." In the sad "I Still Can't Believe You're Gone", the man realizes the vast impact on his life of her leaving. "It's Not Supposed to Be That Way" reflects his inability to accept the situation and his grief, but still in a self-centered way. In "Heaven and Hell", the man expresses his ambivalence about living without his wife, with the lyric: "Sometimes it's heaven, sometimes it's hell, and sometimes I don't even know." The final track is "Phases and Stages/Pick Up the Tempo/Phases and Stages", in which the man reveals his inability to change his character, and accepts his nature and its consequences.

Nelson called the subject of many of the songs "grief, grief, and more grief", while he also clarified that Phases and Stages was a fictional account: "The overall theme was not a reflection of my own life...I was simply making up a story. Sure, I’d gone through breakups and heartaches of my own. What human soul hasn’t? ". Nelson revealed that “It’s Not Supposed to Be That Way” was written for his daughter Susie, "a father talking to his daughter, saying to her what I was now saying to Susie. Instead of trying to give people advice, I am better at putting my feelings into a song." "I Still Can’t Believe You’re Gone" was written about Paul English’s wife Carlene, who committed suicide, but, Nelson later suggested, “it has a lot of different meanings to a lot of different people who have no idea why I wrote it.” “Bloody Mary Morning” previously appeared on Nelson's 1970 LP Both Sides Now but “the sentiment fit the story” so he recut it at Muscle Shoals.

== Release and reception ==
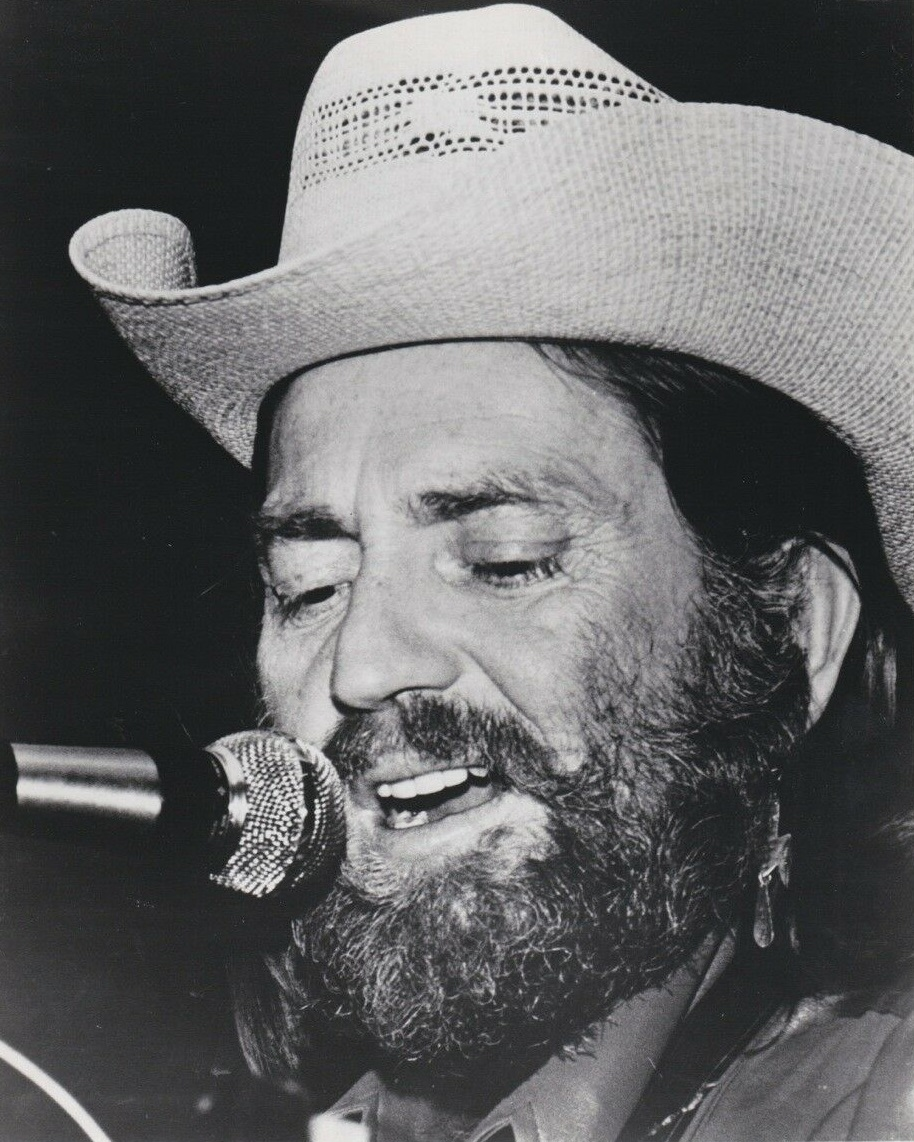
Nelson featured on a publicity portrait for Atlantic Records

The album was released in March 1974. Initially, Nelson was concerned with the commercial performance of another concept album following the failure of Yesterday's Wine. It peaked at number 34 in Billboard's Top Country Albums and number 187 in Billboard's Top LPs & Tapes. The single "Bloody Mary Morning" peaked at number 17, and its follow-up, "I Still Can't Believe You're Gone", peaked at number 51 in Billboard's Country singles.

Despite the moderate success of Nelson's singles, Atlantic Records' executives were unhappy with Nelson's style, and closed their Country Music division in September 1974. Wexler protested to Ahmet and Nesuhi Ertegun, arguing that Atlantic had Willie Nelson. The Ertegun brothers replied "Willie Who? Go ahead and close it." Following the division's closure, Wexler resigned. The album sold 400,000 copies, and Nelson was released from his Atlantic contract, prompting Columbia Records' executives to offer Nelson a contract giving him complete creative control of his works.

Wexler later described Phases and Stages and Shotgun Willie as "having set Willie on a new path ... it was the coalescing of his audience, where the rednecks and the hippies came together. And to this day, that's Willie's audience." Mentioning Atlantic Records's doubts of recording Nelson at Muscle Shoals, Wexler wrote on his autobiography: "They said Muscle Shoals was too R&B for Willie. I said Willie was too R&B for Nashville". Nelson declared "Playing with the Muscle Shoals rhythm section, I was able to sharpen the edges. Wexler was right. That studio brought out the blues in me, big time.” The album became one of the first concept albums in country music.

Phases and Stages was reissued by Atlantic Records on CD and LP formats in 2008.

=== Critical reception ===
Professional ratings
Review scores
Source	Rating
AllMusic	5/5 stars
Christgau's Record Guide	A−

Rolling Stone wrote: "(Nelson) seems to understand an unloved woman better than any dozen articles from Ms. (magazine). The fact that Nelson can fashion a believable scenario with such sparseness is a tribute to his ability to turn experience into good music. Phases And Stages, his best work to date, now seems to call out for the filmmaker who can turn good music into good cinema". Texas Monthly described the album as "a compassionate account of dissolution of marriage, which gave extremely sensitive male and female viewpoints".

Billboard wrote: "Nelson's unfettered voice honestly portrays his songs of love and lament". Critic Robert Christgau wrote: "Nelson's combination of soft-spoken off-key and battered honky-tonk matches the bare, responsive country music Jerry Wexler has gotten out of the Muscle Shoals regulars." Newsweek wrote: "In Phases and stages (Nelson) looked far beyond country music's traditional shore of self pity toward a clear vision of real life country divorce".

The Los Angeles Times review by critic Robert Hilburn remarked previous attempts at concept albums by Johnny Cash, Merle Haggard and Bob Wills on country music and called Phases and Stages "an important breakthrough" for musicians of the genre to "use more care and ambition in the production of their albums". Hilburn felt that the result of the album presented a "chilling, authentic reflection of the contradictory, semi-desperate feelings" regarding divorce. He considered Nelson's voice "restrained, yet dramatic, while he deemed the instrumentation in the album "brilliantly controlled, economic and tailored". Hillburn further added that Wexler's production and the Muscle Shoals musicians added the "right, crisp distinctive edge" that the album presented. The review concluded that the album was a "major work by an artist whose talent has long deserved more attention".

The Detroit Free Press deemed the songwriting in the album "heavy, heart-holding words". In its review, The Evening Sun mentioned that Phases and Stages was "being talked up as C&W's answer to Tommy and Sgt. Pepper's Lonely Hearts Club Band". The reviewer added that it would "hopefully" attract listeners and "convince the people" to listen to Country music and to "discover the passion and intelligence, the perceptions and observations so abundant through it". Register and Tribune Syndicate welcomed it as a "well-conceived, complex performance, a true concept". It considered that the album was "heightened" by Nelson's "light but powerful tenor vocals", while it remarked the "oodles of careful producer's effects" by Wexler.

Stephen Thomas Erlewine wrote for AllMusic: "...the deceptively relaxed arrangements, including the occasional strings, not only highlight Nelson's clever eclecticism, but they also heighten the emotional impact of the album. [...] As a result, this is not just one of Willie Nelson's best records, but one of the great concept albums overall".

== LP track listing ==
All songs written by Willie Nelson.

Side one
No.	Title	Length
1.	"Phases and Stages (Theme)" / "Washing the Dishes"	2:06
2.	"Phases and Stages (Theme)" / "Walkin'"	3:58
3.	"Pretend I Never Happened"	3:00
4.	"Sister's Coming Home" / "Down at the Corner Beer Joint"	3:46
5.	"(How Will I Know) I'm Falling in Love Again"	3:27

Side two
No.	Title	Length
1.	"Bloody Mary Morning"	2:48
2.	"Phases and Stages (Theme)" / "No Love Around"	2:24
3.	"I Still Can't Believe You're Gone"	4:15
4.	"It's Not Supposed to Be That Way"	3:27
5.	"Heaven and Hell"	1:52
6.	"Phases and Stages (Theme)" / "Pick Up the Tempo" / "Phases and Stages (Theme)"	3:26

== Personnel ==
Musicians

- Willie Nelson – acoustic guitar, vocals
- Fred Carter Jr. – acoustic, 12-string, & electric guitars, Dobro
- Pete Carr – acoustic & electric guitars, Dobro, backing vocals on "Pick Up the Tempo"
- John Hughey – pedal steel guitar
- Johnny Gimble – fiddle, mandolin
- Barry Beckett – keyboards
- David Hood – bass guitar
- Roger Hawkins – drums
- Eric Weissberg – banjo on "Down at the Corner Beer Joint"
- Al Lester – fiddle on "Bloody Mary Morning"
- Jeanie Greene – backing vocals on "Pick Up the Tempo"
- George Soulé – backing vocals on "Pick Up the Tempo"
- Mike Lewis – string arrangements on "I Still Can't Believe You're Gone" and "It's Not Supposed to Be that Way"

Studio

- Jerry Wexler – producer
- Jerry Masters – engineer
- Steve Melton – engineer
- Tom Dowd – remix
- Willie Nelson – liner notes

== Charts ==
Chart (1974–1976)	Peak position
US Billboard 200	187
US Top Country Albums (Billboard)	34
