= Let's Face the Music and Dance (Willie Nelson album) =

Studio album by Willie Nelson
- Released: April 16, 2013
- Studio: Pedernales Recording (Spicewood, Texas)
- Genre: Country, rock, jazz, pop
- Length: 48:17
- Label: Legacy
- Producer: Buddy Cannon

Willie Nelson chronology
Heroes (2012)	Let's Face the Music and Dance (2013)	To All the Girls... (2013)

Let's Face the Music and Dance is the 61st studio album by American country singer-songwriter Willie Nelson. Nelson's second album under his contract with Legacy Recordings, it was released on April 16, 2013. The album produced by Buddy Cannon featured a collection of standards that Nelson and his sister Bobbie played throughout their careers.

== Recording ==
Composed of pop, jazz, rock, and country music standards, the set also included a new version of Nelson's original "Is the Better Part Over" from his 1989 album A Horse Called Music. The album was recorded at Nelson's Pedernales studio in Austin, Texas, was produced by Buddy Cannon and later mixed by Butch Carr at Budro Music Repair Shop in Nashville, Tennessee. The album focuses in his musical relation with his sister, Bobbie, as the standards were played by them during their childhood and throughout their musical career.

== Release and reception ==
The second album by Nelson under his contract with Legacy Recordings, it was released on April 16, 2013.

Professional ratings
Aggregate scores
Source	Rating
Metacritic	68/100
Review scores
Source	Rating
AllMusic	3/5 stars
The Arts Desk	4/5 stars
The Austin Chronicle	3/5 stars
Entertainment Weekly	B
Exclaim!	7/10
MSN Music (Expert Witness)	B+
musicOMH	4/5 stars
Paste	8.0/10
PopMatters	7/10
Uncut	9/10

AllMusic rated the album with three stars out of five, Stephen Thomas Erlewine praised the musicality, describing Nelson and The Family's sound as "one seamless unit". The Austin Chronicle also rated the album with three stars out of five, and referred to Nelson's upcoming birthday, calling it "An exquisitely contemplative turn into 80".

Exclaim! praised Nelson's guitar playing and described the band as a "small combo playing songs as timeless as (Nelson's) wonderfully idiosyncratic voice". Daily Record also favored his guitar playing as well as voice, also remarking Nelson's tendence to feature covers, instead of original songwriting in his recent recordings. Popmatters praised Nelson's coordination with the band, describing the record as "a welcome effort; it’s comfortable, graceful, and uniformly pleasant".

== Track listing ==
No.	Title	Writer(s)	Length
1.	"Let's Face the Music and Dance"	Irving Berlin	3:23
2.	"Is The Better Part Over"	Willie Nelson	2:39
3.	"You'll Never Know"	Harry Warren, Mack Gordon	3:32
4.	"Vous Et Moi"	Django Reinhardt	3:23
5.	"Walkin' My Baby Back Home"	Roy Turk, Fred E. Ahlert	3:42
6.	"Matchbox"	Carl Perkins	2:40
7.	"Twilight Time"	Buck Ram	4:07
8.	"I Can’t Give You Anything But Love"	Jimmy McHugh, Dorothy Fields	3:45
9.	"I’ll Keep On Loving You"	Moon Mullican	3:38
10.	"I Wish I Didn't Love You So"	Frank Loesser	4:18
11.	"South Of The Border"	Jimmy Kennedy; Michael Carr	3:51
12.	"Nuages"	Django Reinhardt	3:37
13.	"Marie (The Dawn Is Breaking)"	Irving Berlin	3:07
14.	"Shame On You"	Spade Cooley	2:25
Total length:			48:17

== Personnel ==
- Willie Nelson - acoustic guitar, lead vocals
- Jim "Moose" Brown - Hammond B-3 organ
- Paul English - snare drums, gut string guitar
- Bobbie Nelson - piano
- Micah Nelson - charango, percussion
- Mickey Raphael - harmonica
- Kevin Smith - upright bass

== Charts ==
Chart (2013)	Peak position
US Billboard Top Country Albums	16
US Billboard 200	49
