= Willie Nelson Live =

Live album by Willie Nelson
- Released: 1976
- Genre: Country
- Length: 35:10
- Label: RCA

Willie Nelson chronology
Country Music Concert (1966)	Willie Nelson Live (1976)	Willie and Family Live (1978)

Willie Nelson Live (1976) is a reconfigured re-release of the 1966 LP Country Music Concert by Willie Nelson.

== Track listing ==
1. I Gotta Get Drunk - 2:42
2. Medley: Mr. Record Man/Hello Walls/One Day at a Time - 5:12
3. Medley: The Last Letter/Half a Man - 4:27
4. I Never Cared for You 2:27
5. Yesterday - 2:55
6. Touch Me - 2:21
7. Something to Think About - 2:26
8. I Just Can't Let You Say Goodbye - 2:39
9. How Long Is Forever - 2:51
10. Medley: Opportunity to Cry/Permanently Lonely - 4:40
11. My Own peculiar Way - 2:30
