= Willie and Family =

Willie and Family might refer to:

- Willie Nelson, American country singer and songwriter
- The Family, Nelson's backing and recording band
- Willie and Family Live, a 1978 live album by Willie Nelson
- Willie Nelson & Family, a 2023 television documentary on Willie Nelson
