= Family (Willie Nelson's band) =

Willie Nelson's touring and recording group

The Family
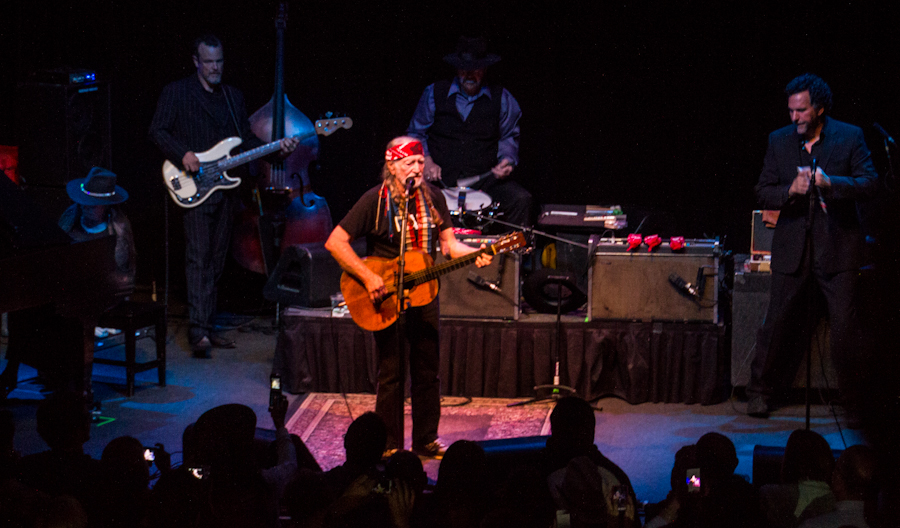
- Nelson and his band performing in Washington, D.C., in 2012

Background information
- Genres: Country
- Years active: 1973–present
- Members: Willie Nelson; Mickey Raphael; Billy English; Kevin Smith; Lukas Nelson; Waylon Payne
- Past members: Paul English; Jimmy Day; Jody Payne; Grady Martin; Chris Ethridge; Bee Spears; Rex Ludwick; Bobbie Nelson; Micah Nelson
- Website: willienelson.com

The Family is the lead singer Willie Nelson's touring and recording group. Nelson, who did not manage through the 1960s to succeed as a singer, retired after the failure of his 1971 album Yesterday's Wine. The following year, he returned from retirement rejuvenated by the burgeoning music movement of Austin, Texas.

In 1973, he formed a new backing band. The new lineup consisted of some of the members of his old road band "The Record Men," with the addition of new members. The original lineup included his sister, Bobbie, on the piano; drummer Paul English; harmonicist Mickey Raphael; bassist Bee Spears; and guitarist Jody Payne. The current lineup includes all the members but Jody Payne, who retired in 2008, Bee Spears, who died in 2011, and Paul English, who died in February 2020. Billy English joined in 1983 on percussion. Replacing Spears, Kevin Smith joined the band in 2012, and Willie Nelson’s son Lukas Nelson joined in 2013 replacing Payne. Bobbie Nelson died in 2022. Willie's son Micah replaced his brother Lukas in 2022, and Waylon Payne (Jody Payne's son) has filled in for Micah at some 2023 shows.

== The Record Men ==
During the 1960s, while recording as an RCA Records artist, Nelson was backed in the studio by session musicians, while he also had a road band. In 1966, he formed a new lineup for his road band, consisting of Johnny Bush on guitar; Jimmy Day on the steel guitar; Paul English on drums; and David Zettner on bass. The band was originally named "The Offenders", but after it was rejected by the promoters, the name was changed to "The Record Men", after Nelson's single "Mr. Record Man". Zettner left the band in 1968 after he was drafted. He was replaced on the bass by his friend Bee Spears. While playing in the band, Johnny Bush also played as a solo act on the package of the Willie Nelson Show. After Zettner was discharged from the military he returned to the band, and Spears started to play for Bush. Bush left The Record Men to concentrate on his solo act a few months later. After a brief exit of Jimmy Day to play with Ray Price's Cherokee Cowboys, Paul English's older brother, Oliver, joined for nine months playing the steel guitar. In 1969 Jimmy Day and David Zettner returned, while Billy English, Paul English's younger brother, joined to play the drums.

By 1971, after nearly a decade with RCA, Nelson had no major success. Meanwhile, his latest album Yesterday's Wine failed to chart and to meet RCA expectations. Although his contract was not over, Nelson decided to retire because of the number of failures he had had.

== Forming the Family ==
He moved to Austin, Texas, where the burgeoning hippie music scene rejuvenated the singer. His popularity in Austin soared as he played his own brand of country music marked by country, folk and jazz influences. In 1972, Nelson's friend Darrell Royal, introduced him to harmonicist Mickey Raphael during a jam session. Nelson soon returned to the recording under a new contract with Atlantic Records. His sister Bobbie, who performed on piano in Nelson's band during his childhood throughout the Texas Honky-Tonk circuit, joined the band during the recording of Shotgun Willie. After Nelson's relationship with Jimmy Day became turbulent, due to his habitual drinking, and after he was shot by Paul English during a dispute, Day left shortly after recording Shotgun Willie. Nelson retired the steel guitar from his backing, using Raphael's harmonica to replace the steel guitar on the melody lines. He later also hired Merle Haggard's touring guitarist Jody Payne. The final lineup consisted of Bobbie Nelson (piano), Paul English (drums), Bee Spears (bass), Mickey Raphael (harmonica), and Jody Payne (guitar). The band that became known as the Family, performed together for the first time at the Armadillo World Headquarters in Austin, Texas, where they were acclaimed by the audience.

Rex Ludwick played drums with the band from 1976 to 1979, Chris Ethridge played bass from 1978-1982, and Grady Martin played guitar from 1979-1994. In 2012, Kevin Smith joined the band as the bassist after the death of Bee Spears earlier the same year. Smith had already backed Nelson on his 2009 album Willie and the Wheel. Willie & Family tours North America in the bio-diesel bus Honeysuckle Rose V, which is fueled by Bio-Willie.

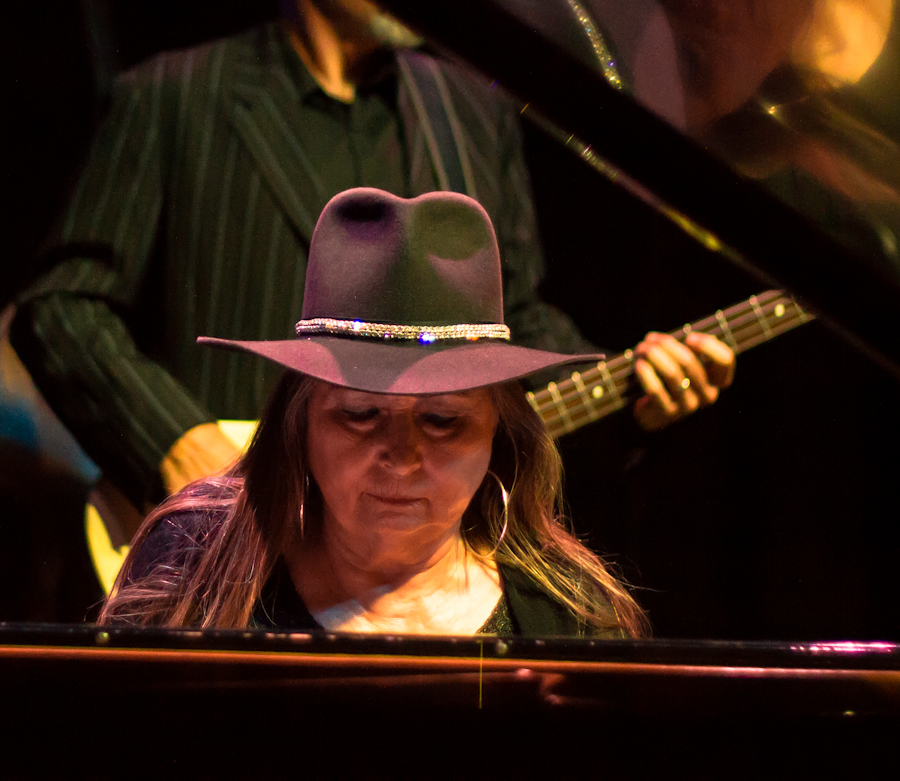
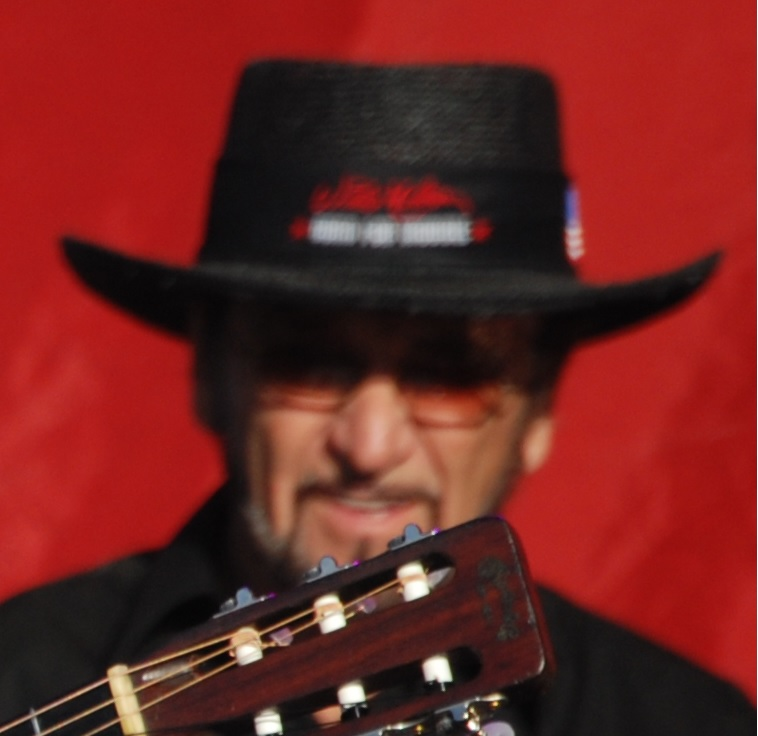
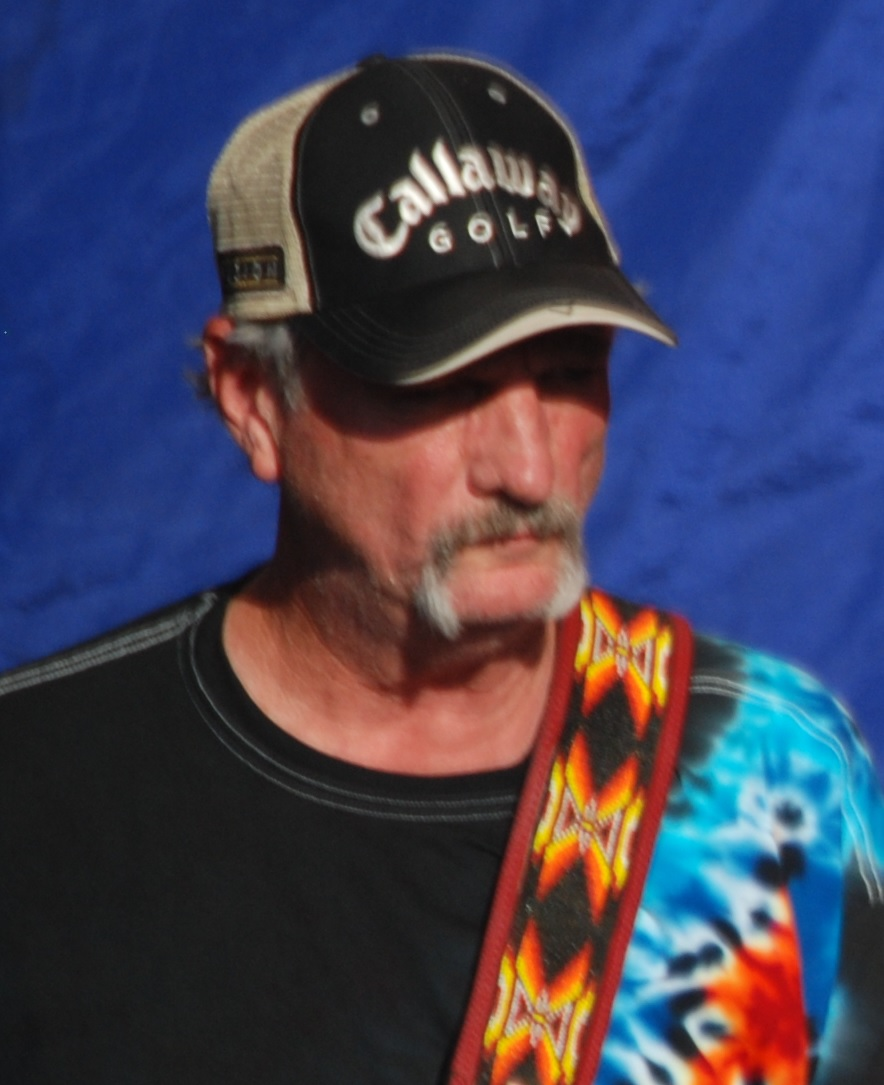
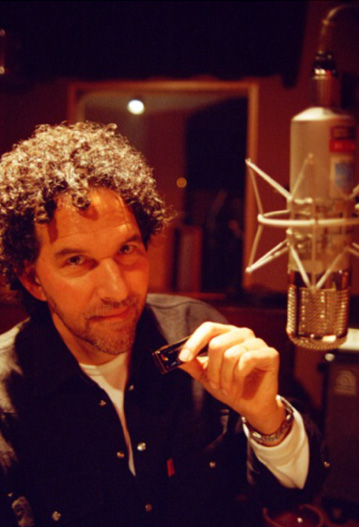
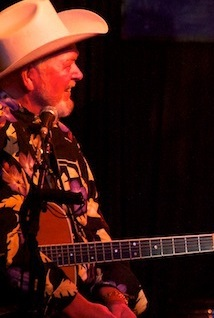
Main historical lineup of Willie Nelson's Family: (L-R) Bobbie Nelson (piano), Paul English (drums), Bee Spears (bass), Mickey Raphael (harmonica) and Jody Payne (guitar)

== Members ==
Current

- Willie Nelson – lead vocals, lead/rhythm guitar (1973–present)
- Mickey Raphael – harmonica (1973–present)
- Billy English – drums, percussion (1975, 1983–present)
- Kevin Smith – double bass (2012–present)
- Lukas Nelson – rhythm and lead guitars, backing and occasional lead vocals (2013–2022, part time appearances 2022–present)
- Micah Nelson - rhythm guitar, backing and occasional lead vocals (2022–present; part time appearances 2023-present)
- Waylon Payne - rhythm guitar, backing and occasional lead vocals (2023–present)

Former

- Paul English – drums, percussion (1973–2020; his death)
- Jimmy Day – steel guitar (1973; died 1999)
- Bobbie Nelson – piano (1973–2022; her death)
- Bee Spears – bass (1973–2011; his death)
- Jody Payne – lead guitar, backing and occasional lead vocals (1973–2008; died 2013)
- Rex Ludwick – drums (1976–1979; died 2004)
- Chris Ethridge – bass (1978–1982; died 2012)
- Grady Martin – lead guitar (1979–1994; died 2001)

Timeline

== Discography ==
- Willie Nelson & Family (1971)
- Red Headed Stranger (1975)
- Willie and Family Live (1978)
- Honeysuckle Rose (1980)
- Me & Paul (1985)
- Night and Day (1999)
- Let’s Face the Music and Dance (2013)
- The Willie Nelson Family (2021)

== Books ==
- Thomson, Graeme (2012). Willie Nelson: The Outlaw. Random House. ISBN 978-1-448-13341-3.
- Harden, Lydia Dixon; Hoekstra, Dave; McCall, Michael; Morris, Edward; Williams, Janet (1996). The Stars of Country Music:The Legends & The New Breed. Publications International, Ltd. ISBN 978-1-56173-697-3.
- Kienzle, Richard (2003). Southwest Shuffle: Pioneers of Honky-Tonk, Western Swing, and Country Jazz. Routledge. ISBN 978-0-415-94103-7.
- Milner, Jay Dunston (1998). Confessions of a Maddog: A Romp Through the High-Flying Texas Music and Literary Era of the Fifties to the Seventies. University of North Texas Press. ISBN 978-157441050-1.
- Nelson, Willie; Shrake, Bud; Shrake, Edwin (2000). Willie: An Autobiography. Cooper Square Press.
- Patoski, Joe Nick (2008). Willie Nelson: An Epic Life. Hachette Digital. ISBN 978-0-316-01778-7.
- Reid, Jan; Sahm, Shawn (2010). Texas Tornado: The Times and Music of Doug Sahm. University of Texas Press. ISBN 978-0-292-72196-8.
- Scobey, Lola (1982). Willie Nelson: Country Outlaw. Kensington Publishing Corporation. ISBN 978-089083936-2.
