= My Heroes Have Always Been Cowboys =

My Heroes Have Always Been Cowboys may refer to:

- My Heroes Have Always Been Cowboys (film), a 1991 Western drama film
- "My Heroes Have Always Been Cowboys" (song), a Willie Nelson song from the soundtrack to the 1979 film The Electric Horseman
