= Heavy on the Soul =

Ty Myers album

Studio album by Ty Myers
- Released: March 27, 2026
- Studios: FAME Studios, Muscle Shoals, Alabama
- Length: 58:40
- Labels: Records; Columbia Nashville
- Producer: Brandon Hood

Ty Myers chronology
The Select (2025)	Heavy on the Soul (2026)	Two Braids & The Truth (2026)

Heavy on the Soul is the second studio album by American singer-songwriter and musician Ty Myers. The album was released on March 27, 2026, via Records/Columbia Nashville. A follow-up to his debut album, The Select, Myers re-teamed with producer Brandon Hood. The album was recorded at the iconic FAME Studios in Muscle Shoals, Alabama, with the title being a reference to the venue's history of soul music and the influence of those artists on Myers' sound. Myers co-wrote all sixteen of the album's original songs, including eleven solo writes, and the project also features a cover of Little Feat's "Two Trains", a collaboration with Marcus King. It was preceded by the release of six of the project's tracks: "Leaving Carolina", "Through a Screen", "Come On Over, Baby", "Two Trains", "Message to You", and "Morning Comes".

== Background ==
Myers first gained attention in 2023 when his song "Tie That Binds" went viral on TikTok, earning him a national audience at age 16, which ultimately led to a record deal with Columbia Records. His 2024 debut EP Ends of the Earth solidified his momentum, producing hits like "the title track" and "Drinkin' Alone". Myers released his debut album The Select on January 24, 2025.

Heavy on the Soul was officially announced on January 13, 2026. Myers stated that, while growing up, his father would primarily play traditional country music, which he describes as his "first love", but that his mother exposed him to soul artists like Otis Redding, Sam Cooke, and Gladys Knight, which he credits with changing his perspective on music. Of this, Myers expressed, "I wanted that soulful feel to run through the songs because that sound has influenced me so much." Regarding recording the album at FAME Studios, Myers stated, "You walk into that building and the music and the history is in the wood, it's in the walls. There's no avoiding it. Recording vocals in the same booth that Etta James and Aretha Franklin recorded in is like magic, there's no other feeling that beats that. Making music in there was just such a special experience."

== Track listing ==
Heavy on the Soul track listing
No.	Title	Writer(s)	Length
1.	"Morning Comes"	Scooter Carusoe; Ty Myers	4:11
2.	"Me Neither"	Myers	3:32
3.	"Pedestas"	Myers	3:13
4.	"Don't You Know"	Myers	4:33
5.	"Message to You"	Myers	3:37
6.	"Run, Run, Run"	Andy Austin; Harper O'Neil; Jason Nix; Myers	3:02
7.	"Game Called Love"	Myers	2:57
8.	"Leaving Carolina"	Myers; Brandon Watts	3:45
9.	"Come On Over, Baby"	Myers	3:19
10.	"Woman"	Myers	1:40
11.	"Through a Screen"	Myers	4:21
12.	"Two Trains" (featuring Marcus King)	Lowell George	3:35
13.	"Southbound"	Myers	3:40
14.	"Songs for You"	Marcus King; Myers	2:52
15.	"Gone Too Long"	Myers; Watts	3:13
16.	"Bad Guy"	Myers	3:16
17.	"Good Morning Paris"	Myers	3:54
Total length:			58:40

== Personnel ==
Credits adapted from Tidal.

=== Musicians ===
- Ty Myers – lead vocals
- Brandon Hood – acoustic guitar (tracks 1–3, 5–15, 17), electric guitar (1, 2, 5–9, 11–16), solo (2), percussion (3, 4, 6, 11, 16, 17), bass (4, 17), electric piano (6), sitar (11, 16), mandolin (17)
- Trey Keller – background vocals (1–9, 11–17)
- Chris McHugh – drums (1–9, 11–17)
- Kris Donegan – electric guitar (1–9, 11–17)
- Eric Darken – percussion (1–9, 11–17)
- Tom Bukovac – electric guitar (1–8, 11–17), acoustic guitar (9)
- Gordon Mote – keyboards (1–5, 7–9, 11–17), organ (6)
- Bruce Bouton – steel guitar (1–3, 5, 7–9, 11–17), Dobro (4, 6)
- Mark Hill – bass (1–3, 5–9, 11–17)
- Steve Patrick – trumpet (1, 4, 6, 9, 15), fluegelhorn (1), horn (15)
- Jonathan Salcedo – trombone (1, 4, 6, 9, 15)
- Gale Mayes – background vocals (1, 5, 7, 8, 12, 13, 15)
- Vicki Hampton – background vocals (1, 5, 8, 15)
- Jovan Quallo – flute, saxophone (1); tenor saxophone (6, 9, 15), baritone saxophone (6, 15)
- Barry Green – horn (1)
- Owen Fader – alto saxophone, baritone saxophone, tenor saxophone (4)
- Angela Primm – background vocals (7, 12, 13)
- Kristin Wilkinson – performance arrangement, viola (11, 17)
- Chris Farrell – viola (11, 17)
- Annaliese Kowert – violin (11, 17)
- David Angell – violin (11, 17)
- David Davidson – violin (11, 17)
- Alicia Enstrom – violin (11)
- Austin Hoke – cello (11)
- Marcus King – lead vocals (12)
- Charlie Judge – synthesizer (14)
- Jung Min Shin – violin (17)
- Kevin Bate – cello (17)

=== Technical ===
- Brandon Hood – production, digital editing (all tracks); additional engineering (1–9, 11–17)
- Seth Morton – engineering, recording, mixing
- Lance Van Dyke – engineering assistance
- Mark Hagen – digital editing
- Trey Keller – digital editing (1–9, 11–17)
- Nathan Dantzler – mastering
- Harrison Tate – mastering assistance
- Jake Hill – coordination

== Charts ==
Chart performance for Heavy on the Soul
Chart (2026)	Peak position
US Americana/Folk Albums (Billboard)	15
US Top Country Albums (Billboard)	35
