= Super Hits (Willie Nelson album) =

1994 compilation album by Willie Nelson

Greatest hits album by Willie Nelson
- Released: 1994
- Genre: Country
- Label: Legacy
- Producers: Willie Nelson, Sydney Pollack, Merle Haggard, Fred Foster, Booker T. Jones, Chips Moman

Willie Nelson chronology
Half Nelson (1985)	Super Hits (1994)	Super Hits, Volume 2 (1995)

Super Hits is the first of two compilation albums in the Super Hits series featuring songs by country singer Willie Nelson. The album was certified 2× Platinum by the RIAA for sales of 2 million copies. As of April 2017, the album has sold 2,919,300 copies in the United States.

== Track listing ==
No.	Title	Writer(s)	Length
1.	"On the Road Again"	Willie Nelson	2:34
2.	"My Heroes Have Always Been Cowboys"	Sharon Vaughn	3:04
3.	"Blue Eyes Crying in the Rain"	Fred Rose	2:20
4.	"Nothing I Can Do About It Now"	Beth Nielsen Chapman	3:19
5.	"Georgia on My Mind"	Hoagy Carmichael, Stuart Gorrell	4:21
6.	"Living in the Promiseland"	David Lynn Jones	3:22
7.	"Pancho and Lefty" (with Merle Haggard)	Townes Van Zandt	4:48
8.	"Always on My Mind"	Johnny Christopher, Mark James, Wayne Carson Thompson	3:33
9.	"City of New Orleans"	Steve Goodman	4:50
10.	"Angel Flying Too Close to the Ground"	Nelson	4:24

== Critical reception ==
Professional ratings
Review scores
Source	Rating
Allmusic	3/5 stars

Super Hits received three out of five stars from Stephen Thomas Erlewine of Allmusic. Erlewine concludes that the album is "not bad" but "far from definitive."

== Chart performance ==
Super Hits peaked at No. 34 on the U.S. Billboard Top Country Albums chart the week of July 22, 1995.

=== Weekly charts ===
Chart (1994–95)	Peak position
Canadian Country Albums (RPM)	6
US Billboard 200	98
US Top Country Albums (Billboard)	34

=== Year-end charts ===
Chart (1995)	Position
US Top Country Albums (Billboard)	60
Chart (1996)	Position
US Top Country Albums (Billboard)	55
Chart (2001)	Position
Canadian Country Albums (Nielsen SoundScan)	70
Chart (2002)	Position
Canadian Country Albums (Nielsen SoundScan)	36

== Certifications ==
Region	Certification	Certified units/sales
United States (RIAA)	2× Platinum	2,000,000^{^}
^{^} Shipments figures based on certification alone.

== Super Hits, Volume 2 ==
Super Hits, Volume 2

Greatest hits album by Willie Nelson
- Released: 1995
- Genre: Country
- Label: Legacy

Willie Nelson chronology
Super Hits (1994)	Super Hits, Volume 2 (1995)	Revolutions of Time...The Journey 1975/1993 (1995)

The success of the album resulted in the release of a second volume in 1995. This volume did not repeat the success of the first.

=== Track listing ===
No.	Title	Writer(s)	Length
1.	"Ain't Necessarily So"	Beth Nielsen Chapman	3:06
2.	"Just Out of Reach"	Virgil Stewart	3:36
3.	"Mammas Don't Let Your Babies Grow Up to Be Cowboys"	Ed Bruce	3:28
4.	"Stardust"	Hoagy Carmichael, Mitchell Parish	3:53
5.	"Without a Song"	Edward Eliscu, Billy Rose, Vincent Youmans	3:52
6.	"Seven Spanish Angels"	Troy Seals, Eddie Setser	3:52
7.	"Harbor Lights"	Jimmy Kennedy, Hugh Williams	3:50
8.	"Remember Me (When the Candlelights Are Gleaming)"	Scotty Wiseman	3:50
9.	"When I Dream"	Sandy Mason	3:35
10.	"Let It Be Me"	Gilbert Bécaud, Mann Curtis, Pierre Delanoë	3:30
