= Thought It Was Love =

2025 song by Ty Myers

Song by Ty Myers

from the album The Select
- Released: January 24, 2025
- Genre: Americana
- Length: 4:06
- Label: RECORDS; Columbia
- Songwriter: Ty Myers
- Producer: Brandon Hood

"Thought It Was Love" is a song by American singer-songwriter and musician Ty Myers, released on January 24, 2025, from his debut studio album, The Select. It is his highest-charting song, debuting and peaking at number 79 on the Billboard Hot 100.

== Background ==
Ty Myers wrote the song on a Squier Stratocaster that he bought for $100 from a storage unit sale.

== Critical reception ==
LB Cantrell of MusicRow gave a positive review, writing that the song "showcases Myers' lyrical depth, capturing the darkness of love lost with the finesse of a seasoned songwriter."

== Charts ==
=== Weekly charts ===
Weekly chart performance for "Thought It Was Love"
| Chart (2025–2026) | Peak position |
|---|---|
| US Billboard Hot 100 | 79 |
| US Country Airplay (Billboard) | 58 |
| US Hot Country Songs (Billboard) | 31 |

=== Year-end charts ===
Year-end chart performance for "Thought It Was Love"
| Chart (2025) | Position |
|---|---|
| US Hot Country Songs (Billboard) | 60 |

== Certifications ==
Certifications for "Thought It Was Love"
| Region | Certification | Certified units/sales |
|---|---|---|
| Canada (Music Canada) | Gold | 40,000^{‡} |
| United States (RIAA) | Platinum | 1,000,000^{‡} |
^{‡} Sales+streaming figures based on certification alone.
