= The Select (album) =

Studio album by Ty Myers
- Released: January 24, 2025
- Studio: Starstruck Studios, Nashville, Tennessee
- Genre: Country blues; Southern soul; Americana
- Length: 76:16
- Label: Columbia
- Producer: Tommy Detamore; Brandon Hood

Ty Myers chronology
Ends of the Earth (2024)	The Select (2025)	Heavy on the Soul (2026)

Singles from The Select
- 1. "Ends of the Earth" Released: April 28, 2025

The Select is the debut studio album by American country music artist Ty Myers. The album was released on January 24, 2025, via Columbia Records. The album was co-produced by Tommy Detamore and Brandon Hood.

Myer wrote 12 of the songs himself, with the remainder co-written or written alongside prominent collaborators, including John Mayer, Jessi Alexander, Rhett Akins, and Anderson East.

== Background ==
Myers first gained attention in 2023 when his song "Tie That Binds" went viral on TikTok, earning him a national audience at age 16. That breakout led to a record deal with Columbia Records.

Sessions for The Select were split between producers Tommy Detamore and Brandon Hood.

Two cover songs appear on the album: "Man on the Side" by John Mayer, and "Somewhere Over You", a reimagining of a song his father recorded.

The Select was released on January 24, 2025, with a limited-edition signed 10-song CD and vinyl editions following on March 28, 2025. A deluxe edition, The Select (Deluxe), was released later that year, adding two new songs and acoustic renditions of three tracks, including "Firefly" and "Worry Is a Sickness".

== Critical reception and commercial performance ==
Professional ratings
Review scores
Source	Rating
AllMusic	4/5 stars
Country Central	9.4/10

The Select received acclaim from critics. No Depression called Myers "a generational talent," while MusicRow praised his authentic storytelling. Billboard highlighted Myers as Country Rookie of the Month in January 2025, citing his blend of influences and old-soul maturity.

Holler described "Drunk Love" as a "bewitching tune," and praised the album's lyrical sophistication. Country Central emphasized Myers' versatility, pointing to the contrast between songs like "Thought It Was Love" and "Too Far Gone" as proof of his depth as both a performer and writer.

The album earned over nine million streams per week by early 2025. By March 2025, tracks like "I Thought It Was Love" had reached over 2.2 million weekly global streams.

== Track listing ==
The Select track listing
No.	Title	Writer(s)	Length
1.	"Ends of the Earth"	Ty Myers	4:29
2.	"Real World Now"	Myers	2:56
3.	"Worry Is a Sickness"	Myers	4:14
4.	"Let 'Em Talk"	Trent Dabbs; Anderson East; Myers	3:46
5.	"Love Is Two Faced"	Myers	3:26
6.	"Somewhere Over You"	Michael Reid; Allen Shamblin	4:36
7.	"Never Get Tired (of Loving You)"	Myers	3:58
8.	"Firefly"	Myers	3:48
9.	"Can't Hold Me Down"	Myers	3:45
10.	"Man on the Side"	Clay Cook; John Mayer	4:44
11.	"Thought It Was Love"	Myers	4:06
12.	"Too Far Gone"	Rhett Akins; Jessi Alexander; Myers	4:48
13.	"Drunk Love"	Myers	4:00
14.	"But Me"	Myers	4:10
15.	"Drinkin' Alone"	Myers	4:14
16.	"Tie That Binds"	Myers	4:16
Total length:			76:16

The Select (Deluxe) track listing
No.	Title	Writer(s)	Length
1.	"Help Ourselves" (featuring Harper O'Neill)	Alex Lambert; Ty Myers	4:29
2.	"On the Boulevard"	Myers	2:56
3.	"Thought It Was Love" (acoustic)	Myers	4:14
4.	"Firefly" (acoustic)	Myers	3:46
5.	"Worry Is a Sickness" (acoustic)	Myers	3:26
Total length:			96:30

=== Note ===
- The deluxe edition features five bonus tracks at the beginning, labeled as "Disc 1", followed by the original album as "Disc 2".

== Personnel ==
Credits adapted from Tidal. Track numbers are based on the standard edition track listing, with deluxe edition bonus tracks numbered 17–21.

=== Musicians ===
- Ty Myers – lead vocals (all tracks), acoustic guitar (tracks 14–16)
- Brandon Hood – electric guitar (1–13, 18, 20), acoustic guitar (1–3, 5–7, 11, 13, 17, 18, 20), programming (1, 2, 6–9, 11, 13, 17, 18), solo (2, 5–7, 9, 18), bass (2, 7), guitars (3, 4, 12, 21), 12-string guitar (21)
- Tom Bukovac – electric guitar (1–13, 17, 18), acoustic guitar (8), solo (10)
- Trey Keller – background vocals (1–13, 17–21)
- Chris McHugh – drums (1–13, 17)
- Gordon Mote – keyboards (1–3, 5–11, 13, 17, 18, 20, 2), organ (4, 12), piano (19)
- Bruce Bouton – steel guitar (1, 3–8, 10–13, 17, 18), Dobro (2, 9)
- Eric Darken – percussion (1–4, 6–9, 11–13, 17, 18, 20)
- Kris Donegan – electric guitar (1, 2, 4–7, 9, 12, 13, 17, 18), acoustic guitar (10)
- Mark Hill – bass (1, 3–6, 8–13, 17, 18)
- Seth Morton – programming (1, 13)
- Jim Hoke – horn (6, 9)
- Emmanuel Echem – trumpet (6), horn (9)
- Kristin Wilkinson – strings, viola (11, 19)
- Annaliese Kowert – violin (11, 19)
- David Angell – violin (11, 19)
- David Davidson – violin (11, 19)
- Jung-Min Shin – violin (11, 19)
- Chris Farrell – viola (11, 19)
- Kevin Bate – cello (11, 19)
- David Dorn – keyboards (13)
- Drew Womack – background vocals (14–16)
- Tom Batts – bass (14–16)
- John Owens – drums (14–16)
- Jess Meador – fiddle (14–16)
- John Caroll – guitar (14–16)
- Ronnie Huckaby – keyboards (14–16)
- Tommy Detamore – steel guitar (14–16)

=== Technical ===
- Brandon Hood – production (1–13, 17–21), recording (2–13, 17, 20, 21), additional engineering (1, 19), engineering assistance (1, 2, 6–8, 11, 13), editing (1–13, 18–21)
- Tommy Detamore – production, recording, mixing, mastering (14–16)
- Seth Morton – recording (1–4, 6–13, 17–21), mixing (1–13, 17–21)
- Nolan Verner – recording (2)
- Trey Keller – recording (3, 12), editing (1–13, 18)
- Chris Ashburn – engineering assistance (1–3, 9, 11, 17, 18)
- Harrison Tate – engineering assistance (2, 3, 6–9, 11, 13)
- Mark Hagen – editing (1, 2, 4–13, 18–21)
- Nathan Dantzler – mastering (1–13, 17–21)

== Charts ==
=== Weekly charts ===
Weekly chart performance for The Select
Chart (2025)	Peak position
US Billboard 200	66
US Top Country Albums (Billboard)	12

=== Year-end charts ===
Year-end chart performance for The Select
Chart (2025)	Position
US Billboard 200	163
US Top Country Albums (Billboard)	34
