= Playlist: The Very Best of Willie Nelson =

Greatest hits album by Willie Nelson
- Released: April 29, 2008
- Genre: Country
- Length: 43:08
- Label: Legacy

Willie Nelson chronology
One Hell of a Ride (2008)	Playlist: The Very Best of Willie Nelson (2008)	Legend: The Best of Willie Nelson (2008)

Playlist: The Very Best of Willie Nelson is a compilation album by country singer Willie Nelson. It was released on April 29, 2008.

== Commercial performance ==
Playlist: The Very Best of Willie Nelson peaked at No. 61 on the U.S. Billboard Top Country Albums chart the week of July 26, 2008. The album has sold 125,900 copies in the United States as of October 2019.

== Track listing ==
1. "On the Road Again" - 2:34
2. "If You've Got the Money I've Got the Time" - 2:05
3. "Blue Eyes Crying in the Rain" - 2:19
4. "Angel Flying Too Close to the Ground" - 4:29
5. "The Pilgrim: Chapter 33" - 3:34
6. "I'm Moving On" (featuring Hank Snow) - 2:45
7. "Big River" - 2:47
8. "Georgia on My Mind" - 4:21
9. "If You Can Touch Her at All" - 3:03
10. "Something to Brag About" - 2:03
11. "Live Fast, Love Hard, Die Young" - 2:04
12. "Last Thing I Needed First Thing This Morning" - 4:21
13. "Always on My Mind" - 3:31
14. "Sweet Memories" - 3:12

== Charts ==
Chart (2008)	Peak position
US Top Country Albums (Billboard)	61
