= Naked Willie =

Remix album by Willie Nelson
- Released: March 17, 2009
- Recorded: 1966–1970
- Genre: Country
- Length: 48:46
- Label: Legacy
- Producer: Mickey Raphael

Willie Nelson chronology
Legend: The Best of Willie Nelson (2008)	Naked Willie (2009)	Lost Highway (2009)

Professional ratings
Review scores
Source	Rating
AllMusic	link
Slant Magazine	link

Naked Willie is an album from American country music artist Willie Nelson. This album was released on March 17, 2009, on the Legacy Recordings label. The album include remixes of recordings from 1966 to 1970, stripped-down without orchestration or background vocals. The concept of the album is similar to the Beatles' Let It Be... Naked project released several years before Naked Willie. This album was released in some countries under the alternative title Stripped or Willie Stripped.

== Track listing ==
All songs written by Willie Nelson except as noted.

1. "Bring Me Sunshine" (Sylvia Dee, Arthur Kent) – 2:11
2. "Following Me Around" – 2:42
3. "The Ghost" – 2:34
4. "Happiness Lives Next Door" – 2:36
5. "I Just Dropped By" – 3:19
6. "Jimmy's Road" – 2:37
7. "I Let My Mind Wander" – 2:53
8. "If You Could See What's Going Through My Mind" – 2:55
9. "Johnny One Time" (Dallas Frazier, A.L. Owens) – 2:48
10. "The Local Memory" – 1:50
11. "The Party's Over" – 2:26
12. "Where Do You Stand" – 2:10
13. "When We Live Again" – 2:15
14. "What Can You Do To Me Now" – 3:27
15. "I'm A Memory" – 2:29
16. "Sunday Morning Coming Down" (Kris Kristofferson) – 5:50
17. "Laying My Burdens Down" – 3:01

== Chart performance ==
Chart (2009)	Peak position
U.S. Billboard Top Country Albums	29
U.S. Billboard 200	193
