= Ty Myers =

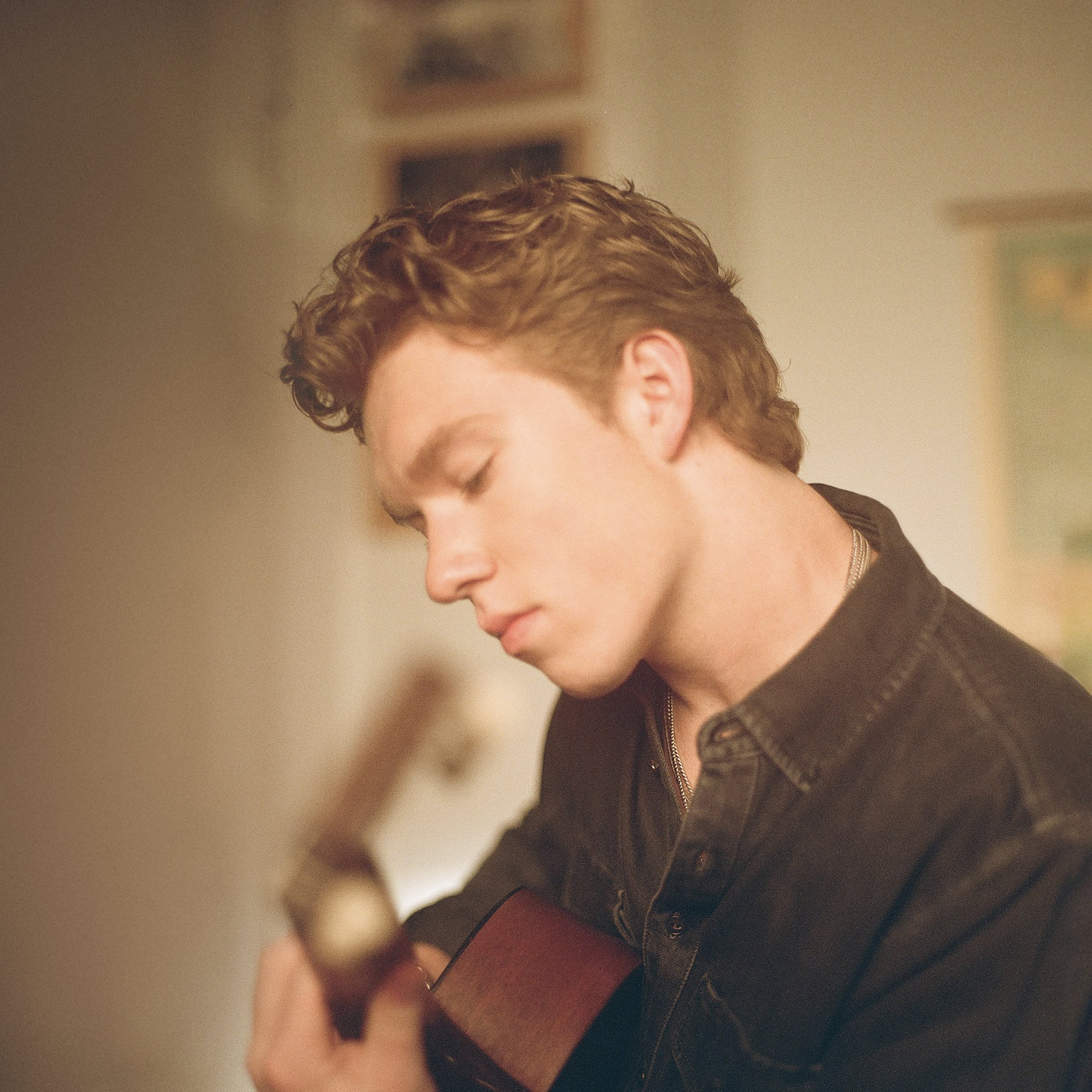

Background information
- Born: Ty Wenston Myers; July 12, 2007 (age 19); Austin, Texas, U.S.
- Genres: Southern soul; country blues; Americana; blues rock
- Occupations: Singer; songwriter
- Instruments: Vocals; guitar; piano
- Years active: 2023–present
- Label: Columbia Records
- Website: tymyersmusic.com

Ty Wenston Myers (born July 12, 2007) is an American singer-songwriter and guitarist who rapidly gained prominence for blending blues, rock, soul, and country influences into his music. He had viral singles in 2024, "Thought It Was Love" and "Ends of the Earth", and released his first studio album, The Select, in 2025.

== Background ==
Myers was born outside of Austin, Texas, growing up on his family's cattle ranch there, it has been in his family for over six generations. His father, a local singer-songwriter, introduced him to music and he began playing guitar around age seven and writing songs by eight.

Ty Myers is the nephew of Dean Sams of Lonestar and related to George Strait's longtime piano player and Ace in the Hole Band member Ronnie Huckaby.

== Career ==
Myers went viral on TikTok posting his music and the song "The Tie That Binds". His mother, Karysa Myers, created his TikTok profile after he suffered a football injury in high school. In 2023, he recorded 8 songs in Floresville, Texas at 'Cherry Ridge Studio' with producer Tommy Detamore, who also played steel guitar on the songs." Ty Myers later signed with Starstruck Management and Columbia Records. The Select, his debut album, was released digitally on January 24, 2025, with a limited-edition signed 10-song CD and vinyl editions following on March 28, 2025. Myers released the project's lead single "Ends of the Earth" to country radio on April 28, and it became his first song to chart on both the Hot Country Songs and Country Airplay charts, reaching No. 20, and on the all-genre Billboard Hot 100. A deluxe edition of The Select was released later in 2025 with two new songs and acoustic renditions of three fan favorites, including "Firefly" and "Worry Is a Sickness".

On January 14, 2026, Myers announced his second album, Heavy on the Soul, would be released on March 27. It was recorded at FAME Studios in Muscle Shoals, Alabama and was produced by Brandon Hood. From March to August 2026, he opened for Luke Combs on Combs' My Kinda Saturday Night Tour. Myers released his third studio album, Two Braids & The Truth, a tribute to Willie Nelson which featured a duet with Carter Faith and a guest appearance from Nelson himself, on September 18, 2026.. He made his TV debut on October 31, 2026, Season 52 Episode 5209 of Austin City Limits.

== Artistry ==
Myers fuses classic country storytelling with bluesy riffs and soulful vocals. He cites a diverse array of influences: country luminaries like George Strait; soul and R&B figures like Otis Redding; blues artists such as Stevie Ray Vaughan; and contemporary inspiration from John Mayer.

Regarding his sound, Myers said while growing up, his father would primarily play traditional country music, which was his "first love", but his mother exposed him to soul artists including Redding, Sam Cooke, and Gladys Knight, which he credits with changing his perspective on music. He then began discovering blues music and cites seeing Vaughan performing "Lenny" for the first time as an "out of body experience" which ignited his love for playing guitar.

== Discography ==
=== Studio albums ===
Title	Details	Peak chart positions		Certifications
Title	Details	US	US Country	Certifications
The Select	Released: January 24, 2025; Label: Columbia Records; Formats: Digital download, streaming	66	12	RIAA: Gold
Heavy on the Soul	Released: March 27, 2026; Label: Columbia; Formats: Digital download, streaming	—	—	
Two Braids & The Truth	Released: September 18, 2026; Label: Columbia; Formats: Digital download, streaming	—	—	

=== Singles ===
Title	Year	Peak chart positions				Certifications	Album
Title	Year	US	US Country	US Country Airplay	CAN Country	Certifications	Album
"Ends of the Earth"	2025	72	20	11	31	RIAA: Platinum; MC: Gold	The Select

=== Promotional singles ===
Title	Year	Peak chart positions			Certifications	Album
Title	Year	US	US Country	US Country Airplay	Certifications	Album
"Tie That Binds"	2023	—	—	—		The Select
"Drinkin' Alone"	2023	—	—	—	RIAA: Platinum	The Select
"But Me"	2023	—	—	—		The Select
"Tomorrow's Out of Sight"	2023	—	—	—		Non-album singles
"Down and Out"	2023	—	—	—		Non-album singles
"Tin Roof Talks"	2023	—	—	—		Non-album singles
"Stay"	2024	—	—	—	RIAA: Gold	Non-album singles
"Malibu"	2024	—	—	—		Non-album singles
"Too Far Gone"	2024	—	—	—		The Select
"Let 'Em Talk"	2024	—	—	—		The Select
"Worry Is a Sickness"	2024	—	—	—		The Select
"Can't Hold Me Down"	2024	—	—	—		The Select
"Drunk Love"	2025	—	—	—		The Select
"Thought It Was Love"	2025	79	31	58	RIAA: Platinum; MC: Gold	The Select
"Leaving Carolina"	2025	—	—	—		Heavy on the Soul
"Through a Screen"	2025	—	—	—		Heavy on the Soul
"Message to You"	2026	— (Note: "Message to You" did not enter the Billboard Hot 100, but peaked at No. 2 on the Bubbling Under Hot 100 chart.)	32	—		Heavy on the Soul
"Always on My Mind" (featuring Carter Faith)	2026	—	—	—		Two Braids & The Truth

== Tours ==
=== Headlining ===
- Let 'Em Talk Tour (2024)
- The Select Tour (2025)
- The Legal Tour (2026)

=== Supporting ===
- My Kinda Saturday Night Tour (2026) (with Luke Combs)
