= Me and the Drummer =

Studio album by Willie Nelson and the Offenders
- Released: June 6, 2000
- Genre: Country
- Label: Luck Records

Willie Nelson and the Offenders chronology
Night and Day (1999)	Me and the Drummer (2000)	Milk Cow Blues (2000)

Tales Out of Luck (Me and the Drummer)
- 2001 European release.

Me and the Drummer is the 47th studio album from American country music artist Willie Nelson. It was released June 6, 2000, by Luck Records. It features Nelson revisiting some of his classic songs from the sixties with his band the Offenders.

The album was re-released in Europe in 2001 under the longer title Tales Out of Luck (Me and the Drummer). The re-release omits "What a Way to Live".

== Track listing ==
All songs by Willie Nelson, except as shown.

1. "Me and the Drummer" (Bill McDavid) - 5:09
2. "Home Motel" - 4:07
3. "Let My Mind Wander" - 5:04
4. "I'd Rather You Didn't Love Me" - 3:25
5. "Something to Think About" - 2:48
6. "No Tomorrow in Sight" - 3:11
7. "I'm So Ashamed" - 3:40
8. "A Moment Isn't Very Long" - 3:19
9. "Rainy Day Blues" - 3:34
10. "You Wouldn't Cross the Street to Say Goodbye" - 3:26
11. "I Guess I've Come to Live Here in Your Eyes" - 2:46
12. "Forgiving You Was Easy" - 2:59
13. "What a Way to Live" - 4:11
