= Milk Cow Blues (album) =

Studio album by Willie Nelson
- Released: September 19, 2000
- Genre: Country, blues
- Label: Island

Willie Nelson chronology
Me and the Drummer (2000)	Milk Cow Blues (2000)	Rainbow Connection (2001)

Milk Cow Blues is the 48th studio album from American country singer Willie Nelson, released on September 19, 2000, on the Island Records label. It features many famous blues artists, including B. B. King and Dr. John.

Professional ratings
Aggregate scores
Source	Rating
Metacritic	59/100
Review scores
Source	Rating
AllMusic	2.5/5 stars
Christgau’s Consumer Guide	(1-star Honorable Mention)
Entertainment Weekly	C
The Independent	4/5 stars
Mojo	0.5/5 stars
Q	3/5 stars
Rolling Stone	3.5/5 stars
Tom Hull – on the Web	B

== Track listing ==
No.	Title	Writer(s)	Duet partner	Length
1.	"Milk Cow Blues"	Kokomo Arnold	Francine Reed	4:30
2.	"Outskirts of Town"	Will Weldon	Keb' Mo'	2:56
3.	"Black Night"	Jessie Mae Robinson	Dr. John	5:22
4.	"Funny How Time Slips Away"	Willie Nelson	Francine Reed	4:11
5.	"Rainy Day Blues"	Nelson	Jonny Lang	5:09
6.	"Crazy"	Nelson	Susan Tedeschi	4:16
7.	"The Thrill Is Gone"	Rick Darnell, Roy Hawkins	B.B. King	4:26
8.	"Wake Me When It's Over"	Nelson		4:12
9.	"Kansas City"	Jerry Leiber, Mike Stoller	Susan Tedeschi	2:51
10.	"Fool's Paradise"	David Avid, Johnny Fuller, Robert Goddins	Dr. John	4:17
11.	"Ain't Nobody's Business"	Porter Grainger, Everett Robbins	Jonny Lang	5:08
12.	"Night Life"	Walt Breeland, Paul Buskirk, Nelson	B.B. King	4:25
13.	"Sittin' on Top of the World"	Lonnie Chatmon, Walter Vinson		4:46
14.	"Lonely Street"	Carl Belew, Kenny Sowder, W. S. Stevenson		4:26
15.	"Texas Flood"	Larry Davis, Joseph Scott	Kenny Wayne Shepherd	8:46

== Personnel ==
- Willie Nelson - guitar
- Derek O'Brien - guitar
- Jimmie Vaughan - guitar
- Kenny Wayne Shepherd - guitar
- Riley Osbourn - B-3 organ, piano
- George Rains - drums
- Mickey Raphael - harmonica
- John Blondell - bass guitar

== Chart performance ==
Chart (2000)	Peak position
Australian Albums (ARIA)	178
Canadian RPM Country Albums	9
U.S. Billboard 200	83
U.S. Billboard Blues Albums	2
