= Message to You (song) =

2026 song by Ty Myers

Promotional single by Ty Myers

from the album Heavy on the Soul
- Released: January 16, 2026
- Studio: FAME Studios (Muscle Shoals, Alabama)
- Genre: Country
- Length: 3:37
- Label: Records; Columbia Nashville
- Songwriter: Ty Myers
- Producer: Brandon Hood

Music video
- "Message to You" on YouTube

"Message to You" is a song by American country music singer Ty Myers, released on January 16, 2026 as the fifth promotional single from his second studio album, Heavy on the Soul (2026). It was written by Myers himself and produced by Brandon Hood.

== Background ==
Ty Myers wrote the song in Barbados, where he was visiting for his birthday. He woke up at 3:00 a.m. with an idea for the song and wrote it in about 25 minutes, before going back to sleep. He recorded the song at FAME Studios in Muscle Shoals, Alabama, with guitarist Tom Bukovac, steel guitarist Bruce Bouton, bassist Mark Hill, and keyboardist Gordon Mote.

== Composition ==
The song is composed of steel guitar tones and finds Ty Myers expressing his love and commitment to a partner in a long-distance relationship. It opens with him yearning for her presence, detailing that he is smoking marijuana to cope with his loneliness. He acknowledges feelings of self-doubt regarding his ability to be the ideal partner, before affirming his devotion to her.

== Music video ==
The music video was directed by John Park and released alongside the song. It sees Ty Myers in a sunlit home setting, writing lyrics in his notebook and sitting in the living room as a pair of movers take away all belongings from the room. Toward the end of the clip, the camera pans back to reveal that the room is only a set on a soundstage, before fading to black as Myers is left alone with his guitar.

== Charts ==
Chart performance for "Message to You"
Chart (2026)	Peak position
US Bubbling Under Hot 100 (Billboard)	2
US Hot Country Songs (Billboard)	32
