= Me & Paul =

Studio album by Willie Nelson
- Released: 1985
- Recorded: November 16, 1984
- Genre: Country
- Length: 34:59
- Label: Columbia
- Producer: Willie Nelson

Willie Nelson chronology
Angel Eyes (1984)	Me & Paul (1985)	The Promiseland (1986)

Singles from Me & Paul
- 1. "Forgiving You Was Easy" Released: February 1985; 2. "Me & Paul" Released: May 1985

Professional ratings
Review scores
Source	Rating
AllMusic	4/5 stars
Robert Christgau	A-

Me & Paul is the 32nd studio album by American country music singer Willie Nelson. The titular Paul refers to Nelson's long-term drummer, Paul English.

== Track listing ==
All songs written by Willie Nelson except where noted.

1. "I Been to Georgia on a Fast Train" (Billy Joe Shaver) - 3:12
2. "Forgiving You Was Easy" - 2:51
3. "I Let My Mind Wander" - 4:02
4. "I'm a Memory" - 2:12
5. "She's Gone" - 3:09
6. "Old Five & Dimers Like Me" (Shaver) - 3:08
7. "I Never Cared For You" - 2:06
8. "You Wouldn't Cross the Street (To Say Goodbye)" - 3:01
9. "Me and Paul" - 2:54
10. "One Day at a Time" - 2:11
11. "Pretend I Never Happened" - 3:37
12. "Black Rose" (Shaver) - 2:36

== Personnel ==
- Willie Nelson - Guitar, vocals
- Billy Gene English - Drums
- Paul English - Percussion, drums
- Grady Martin - Guitar
- Bobbie Nelson - Piano
- Jody Payne - Guitar
- Mickey Raphael - Harmonica
- Bee Spears - Bass

== Charts ==
=== Weekly charts ===
Chart (1985)	Peak position
US Billboard 200	152
US Top Country Albums (Billboard)	3

=== Year-end charts ===
Chart (1985)	Position
US Top Country Albums (Billboard)	9
