= Willie and Family Live =

Live album by Willie Nelson
- Released: November 1978
- Recorded: April 1978
- Genre: Country
- Length: 93:43
- Label: Columbia
- Producer: Willie Nelson

Willie Nelson chronology
Willie Nelson Live (1976)	Willie and Family Live (1978)	All of Me - Live in Concert (2002)

Singles from Willie and Family Live
- 1. "Whiskey River" Released: November 1978

Professional ratings
Review scores
Source	Rating
Allmusic	2/5 stars
Music Week	3/4 stars
Rolling Stone	Favorable

Willie and Family Live is a live album by country music artist Willie Nelson. It was released in 1978 as a double-LP. It was recorded live at Harrah's in Lake Tahoe, Nevada in April 1978. Emmylou Harris provides backup vocals on "Will the Circle be Unbroken", "Uncloudy Day" and "Amazing Grace"; Johnny Paycheck provides backup vocals on "Amazing Grace" and "Take this Job and Shove It".

== Track listing ==
Side one:

1. "Whiskey River" – 3:38
2. "Stay a Little Longer" – 3:24
3. "Funny How Time Slips Away" – 2:45
4. "Crazy" – 1:47
5. "Night Life" – 3:55
6. "If You've Got the Money I've Got the Time" – 1:44
7. "Mammas Don't Let Your Babies Grow Up to Be Cowboys" – 3:33
8. "I Can Get Off on You" – 2:06

Side two:

1. "If You Could Touch Her at All" – 3:00
2. "Good Hearted Woman" – 2:57
3. "Red Headed Stranger Medley" – 14:25

- "Time of the Preacher" – 2:13
- "I Couldn't Believe It Was True" – 1:03
- "Medley: Blue Rock Montana / Red Headed Stranger" – 2:40
- "Blue Eyes Crying in the Rain" – 2:29
- "Red Headed Stranger" – 4:31
4. "Under the Double Eagle" – 2:43

Side three:

1. "Till I Gain Control Again" – 5:59
2. "Bloody Mary Morning" – 3:33
3. "I'm a Memory" – 1:52
4. "Mr. Record Man" – 2:01
5. "Hello Walls" – 1:29
6. "One Day at a Time" – 2:05
7. "Will the Circle Be Unbroken" – 2:18
8. "Amazing Grace" – 5:12

Side four:

1. "Take This Job and Shove It" – 2:52
2. "Uncloudy Day" – 3:40
3. "The Only Daddy That'll Walk the Line" – 1:29
4. "A Song for You" – 2:43
5. "Roll in My Sweet Baby's Arms" – 1:56
6. "Georgia on My Mind" – 4:09
7. "I Gotta Get Drunk" – 1:22
8. "Whiskey River" – 2:42
9. "The Only Daddy That'll Walk the Line" – 2:12

== Chart performance ==
Chart (1978)	Peak position
U.S. Billboard Top Country Albums	1
U.S. Billboard 200	32
Canadian RPM Country Albums	1
Canadian RPM Top Albums	35
