= Ends of the Earth (song) =

Single by Ty Myers

from the album The Select
- Released: April 28, 2025
- Recorded: Starstruck (Nashville, Tennessee)
- Genre: Southern soul; country
- Length: 4:29
- Label: Records; Columbia
- Songwriter: Ty Myers
- Producer: Brandon Hood

Music video
- "Ends of the Earth" on YouTube

"Ends of the Earth" is a song by American singer-songwriter and musician Ty Myers. It was released as Myers' debut single to country radio on April 28, 2025, and served as the lead single from his debut studio album, The Select.

== Background ==
Ty Myers wrote the song late at night in his room, like many of his songs. He had wanted to write a soul song. Myers developed an "old school" intro, which he described as "boom, boom, boom", and then the idea of the title "Ends of the Earth". Myers has said, "The whole basis for the song was…I'll follow you to the ends of the earth. I will be devoted to you…I'll always be your man." He finished composing it within an hour.

Prior to releasing the song, Myers shared a series of teasers on the video-sharing app TikTok. In November 2024, the song was used in over 90,000 videos on the platform.

== Composition ==
The song is built on a staccato electric guitar riff and a "stripped-back, sensual" rhythm. It begins with the protagonist describing the perfect environment for a romantic evening, including his partner's bow and perfume and the moonlight shining through the closed blinds of the bedroom, before expressing frustration at her distancing herself from him when they are seem to be close. The lyrics pivot around the Biblical phrase "To the ends of the earth", which is repeated in the chorus in regard to her decision to whether commit to the relationship or not. Despite being heartbroken by his lover's vacillating attitude, the narrator openly declares his unconditional love for her.

Myers recorded the song at Starstruck Studios in Nashville, Tennessee, and it was produced by Brandon Hood.

== Chart performance ==
Initially released as a promotional single on October 18, 2024, the song became his first to enter the Billboard Hot 100, debuting at number 94. It also debuted prior to its release to country radio at number 60 on the Billboard Country Airplay chart in February 2025.

== Charts ==
=== Weekly charts ===
Weekly chart performance for "Ends of the Earth"
Chart (2025–2026)	Peak position
Canada Country (Billboard)	31
UK Country Airplay (Radiomonitor)	7
US Billboard Hot 100	72
US Country Airplay (Billboard)	11
US Hot Country Songs (Billboard)	20

=== Year-end charts ===
Year-end chart performance for "Ends of the Earth"
Chart (2025)	Position
US Hot Country Songs (Billboard)	37

== Certifications ==
Certifications for "Ends of the Earth"
Region	Certification	Certified units/sales
Canada (Music Canada)	Gold	40,000^{‡}
United States (RIAA)	Platinum	1,000,000^{‡}
^{‡} Sales+streaming figures based on certification alone.

== Release history ==
Release history for "Ends of the Earth"
Region	Date	Format	Label
United States	October 18, 2024	Digital download; streaming	Records; Columbia
United States	April 28, 2025	Country radio	Records; Columbia
