= Reasons to Quit =

Single by Merle Haggard and Willie Nelson

from the album Pancho & Lefty
- B-side: "Half a Man"
- Released: January 15, 1983
- Genre: Country
- Length: 3:28
- Label: Epic
- Songwriter(s): Merle Haggard
- Producer(s): Chips Moman, Willie Nelson, Merle Haggard

Merle Haggard singles chronology
"C.C. Waterback" (1982)	"Reasons to Quit" (1983)	"You Take Me for Granted" (1983)

Willie Nelson singles chronology
"Everything's Beautiful (In Its Own Way" (1983)	"Reasons to Quit" (1983)	"Little Old Fashioned Karma" (1983)

"Reasons to Quit" is a song recorded by American country music artists Merle Haggard and Willie Nelson. It was released in January 1983 as the first single from the album Pancho & Lefty. The song reached #6 on the Billboard Hot Country Singles & Tracks chart. The song was written by Haggard.

== Chart performance ==
Chart (1983)	Peak position
US Hot Country Songs (Billboard)	6
Canadian RPM Country Tracks	7
