= Little Old Fashioned Karma =

- European release picture sleeve

Single by Willie Nelson

from the album Tougher Than Leather
- B-side: "Beer Barrel Polka"
- Released: March 12, 1983
- Genre: Country
- Length: 3:18
- Label: Columbia
- Songwriter(s): Willie Nelson
- Producer(s): Willie Nelson, Bee Spears

Willie Nelson singles chronology
"Reasons to Quit" (1983)	"Little Old Fashioned Karma" (1983)	"Pancho and Lefty" (1983)

"Little Old Fashioned Karma" is a song written and recorded by American country music artist Willie Nelson. It was released in March 1983 as the first single from the album Tougher Than Leather. The song reached number 10 on the Billboard Hot Country Singles & Tracks chart.

== Chart performance ==
Chart (1983)	Peak position
US Hot Country Songs (Billboard)	10
Canadian RPM Country Tracks	20
