= The Last Letter =

1937 Song by Rex Griffin

Single by Rex Griffin
- B-side: "Over the River"
- Published: December 27, 1939 M. M. Cole Publishing Co.
- Released: June 1937
- Recorded: May 13, 1937
- Studio: New York
- Genre: Hillbilly
- Length: 3:03
- Label: Decca 5383
- Songwriter: Rex Griffin

"The Last Letter" is a song written by country music singer Rex Griffin. Griffin wrote the song in 1937, after he was left by his wife. The song tells through a suicidal letter the feelings of an older man who is left by his young wife. The song, released on Decca Records became a hit for Griffin.

A standard of country music, the tune was covered by diverse acts. Jimmie Davis' 1939 version became a hit, while it was covered by diverse country acts.

== Writing and original recording ==
In 1937, singer-songwriter Rex Griffin wrote "The Last Letter" while he was living in New Orleans, Louisiana. He was inspired to write the song after he was left by his wife. The lyrics told the story of a suicide letter written by a common man directed to a woman seeking a rich husband and the finer things in life. It described his bitterness, and pain for the end of their romance. The song probably inspired Hank Williams's similar "A Mansion on the Hill."

Griffin recorded "The Last Letter" during a New York session on May 13, 1937. The single, backed with "Over the River" on the flipside was released the same year on Decca Records. Despite that "The Last Letter" turned into a hit, the poor sales of Griffin caused his dismissal by the label in 1939. That year, Griffin wrote and recorded a sequel called "Answer To The Last Letter". The song became later considered a standard of Country music. By 1941, The Birmingham News reported it to be "one of the most popular boots and saddle songs played by drugstore cowboys".

== Cover versions ==
Country singer Jimmie Davis recorded the song again in 1939, turning it again into a hit. It was covered as well by The Blue Sky Boys and The Carter Family.

In 1963, Ernest Tubb recorded a cover version for his Rex Griffin tribute album Just Call Me Lonesome. The song was recorded at Bradley's Barn studio on April 19, 1962, produced by Owen Bradley Tubb, who was influenced by Griffin, had originally learned the song and others by Griffin that he would often perform. Both singers toured together, remaining friend until Griffin's death in 1958. The same year, Willie Nelson recorded the song. Capitol Records released the song as the flipside of the single "Half a Man".

The following year, Jack Greene released his version of the song on the album Ernest Tubb Presents the Texas Troubadours, becoming after its success a solo act. "The Last Letter" was also covered by Waylon Jennings, Merle Haggard and Glen Campbell.

Bob Dylan's To Ramona is a nod to Rex Griffin and his song The Last Letter.
