= Forgiving You Was Easy =

Single by Willie Nelson

from the album Me & Paul
- B-side: "You Wouldn't Cross The Street (To Say Goodbye)"
- Released: February 1985
- Genre: Country
- Length: 2:51
- Label: Columbia
- Songwriter(s): Willie Nelson
- Producer(s): Willie Nelson

Willie Nelson singles chronology
"Seven Spanish Angels" (1985)	"Forgiving You Was Easy" (1985)	"Are There Any More Real Cowboys" (1985)

"Forgiving You Was Easy" is a song written and recorded by American country music artist Willie Nelson. It was released in February 1985 as the first single from the album Me & Paul. The song was Nelson's tenth number one single as a solo artist. The single went to number one for one week and spent fourteen weeks on the country chart.

== Charts ==
=== Weekly charts ===
Chart (1985)	Peak position
US Hot Country Songs (Billboard)	1
Canadian RPM Country Tracks	1

=== Year-end charts ===
Chart (1985)	Position
US Hot Country Songs (Billboard)	10
