= Half a Man =

Single by Willie Nelson
- B-side: "The Last Letter"
- Released: January 1963
- Recorded: December 1962
- Studio: Bradley's Barn, Mount Juliet, Tennessee
- Genre: Country
- Length: 2:25
- Label: Liberty
- Songwriter(s): Willie Nelson
- Producer(s): Tommy Allsup

Willie Nelson singles chronology
"You Dream About Me" (1962)	"Half a Man" (1963)	"Take My Word" (1963)

"Half a Man" is a song written and recorded by American country music singer Willie Nelson. The song was released as the A-side of the single for his second Liberty Records album, Here's Willie Nelson. Despite receiving mixed airplay for its content, the song became a sales success, peaking at number twenty-five on Billboard's Hot Country Singles and number twenty on Cashbox's country singles.

== Writing and recording ==
Nelson was inspired to write the song after waking up in the middle of the night to smoke a cigarette. With his arm around a sleeping woman, he could not release it without waking her up. Nelson reached for the cigarette with his other arm, and imagined how it would be to only have half of his body. The song told the story of a man who declared that if he lost part of his body, he would resemble the "half a man" that lost love turned him into.

"Half a Man" was recorded during a December 1962 session, produced by Tommy Allsup. Recorded at Bradley's Barn, Nelson was backed by fiddler Tommy Jackson and guitarists Jerry Kennedy, Wayne Moss, and Fred Carter, Jr. The chorus of the song was accentuated by female backing singers. The drummer was Earl Palmer.

== Release and reception ==
The single, coupled with a cover of Rex Griffin's "The Last Letter" was released to promote his second Liberty Records release, Here's Willie Nelson. On a January 1963 review of the single, Billboard called the song as: "(a) potent country reading of a most unusual tune in which the lad pleads for his lass", while describing that tune contained "(the) most unusual imagery".

Despite that the airplay of the song was affected by stations that considered it "morbid", the release reached by April number twenty-five on Billboard's Hot Country Singles. While it remained on Billboard's chart for five weeks, it spent twelve weeks on Cashbox's country singles chart, and peaked at number twenty.

== Other recordings ==
Merle Haggard covered the song in his 1982 release Going Where the Lonely Go. Nelson recorded again the track in a duet with George Jones for his 1985 duet album Half Nelson.

== Chart performance ==
Chart (1963)	Peak position
Billboard Hot Country Singles	25
Cashbox Country Singles	20
