= Jody Payne =

American singer-songwriter

Jody Payne (January 11, 1936 – August 10, 2013) was an American country musician and singer. He is best known as a longtime guitarist in Willie Nelson's band, The Family.

== Early life ==
Payne was born James L. Payne in Garrard County, Kentucky. He and his sister, Imogene Payne (born 1934), sang together when they were five and six years old. He sang and played the mandolin for Imogene's first year graduation and that was the beginning of his music career. His next performance was when he was about 10 or 11, they sang with his father on a radio show on WHIR in Danville.

== Professional career ==
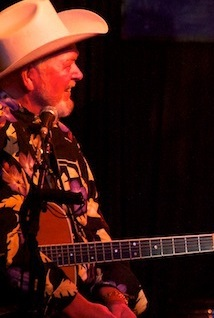
Payne in 2011

In 1951, Payne went on the road playing bluegrass music with Charlie Monroe for a time. After he returned home, the family moved to Cincinnati, Ohio. He was drafted into the Army in 1958 and served two years. He was discharged in 1960 and, in the spring of 1961, went to Detroit, Michigan and started playing at the West Fort Tavern. He then toured with Merle Haggard and The Strangers. Payne also was on recordings with Hank Snow, Tanya Tucker and Leon Russell.

Payne first met Willie Nelson in about 1962 in Detroit. Nelson was playing bass with Ray Price. Payne started working with Nelson in November 1973 and retired in 2008 from his band.

Payne appeared in television and film including: Monk, Songwriter, Soundstage, Farm Aid '86, '97 and The Tenth Anniversary Concert, Austin City Limits, and Honeysuckle Rose. The final recording Payne played on was the 2012 Dallas Moore Band Live Album "Hank To Thank: Live at Historic Herzog Studio."

== Personal life ==
Payne and country singer Sammi Smith married, but later divorced. They had one son, musician/singer/actor Waylon Payne (born 1972). He and his second wife, Vicki, were married in 1980 and lived in Stapleton, Alabama. They had a son, Austin Payne (born 1981). Payne remained active as a musician until his death. Payne died August 10, 2013, at a hospital from cardiac problems. He was 77.
