= Bobbie Nelson =

American pianist and singer (1931–2022)

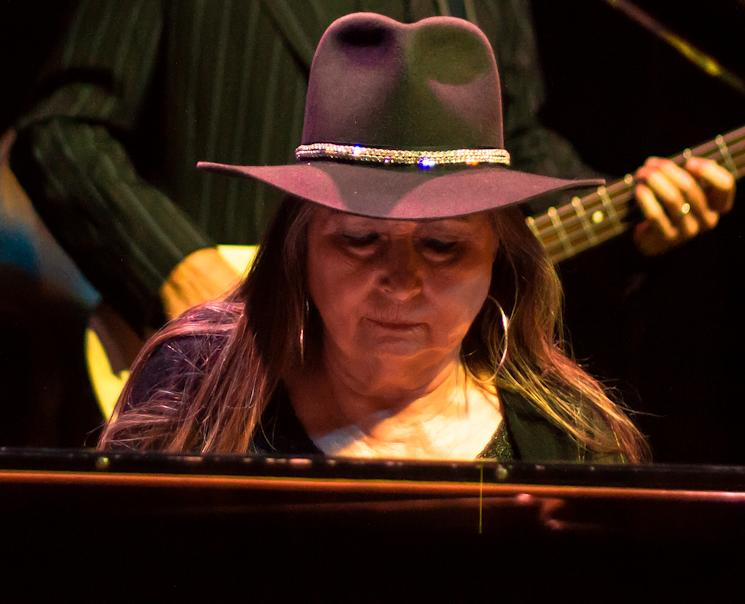
- Nelson performing in 2012

Background information
- Born: Bobbie Lee Nelson; January 1, 1931; Abbott, Texas, U.S.
- Died: March 10, 2022 (aged 91) Austin, Texas, U.S.
- Genre: Country
- Occupation: Musician
- Instrument: Keyboards
- Years active: 1953–2022

Bobbie Lee Nelson (January 1, 1931 – March 10, 2022) was an American pianist and singer, the older sister of Willie Nelson, and a member of his band, Willie Nelson and Family. When she was five years old, her grandmother taught her to play keyboards with a pump organ, and after successful appearances at gospel conventions held in Hillsboro, Texas, her grandfather bought her a piano.

Nelson married Bud Fletcher when she was sixteen. He established a band called The Texans, which she and her brother joined. The group later dissolved in 1955 after she divorced Fletcher. His death six years later resulted in her suffering a breakdown and briefly losing custody of their children. In 1965 she moved to Nashville, Tennessee, after her third marriage failed. She played in restaurants and different venues until she was called by her brother from New York in 1973 for a session. She joined Willie Nelson on the piano during his sessions with Atlantic Records, that produced The Troublemaker, Shotgun Willie and Phases and Stages. The same year she joined The Family full-time and began touring with her brother.

== Early life ==
Nelson was born in Abbott, Texas, on January 1, 1931, to Ira Doyle Nelson and Myrle Marie (née Greenhaw). Her mother moved to Portland, Oregon, soon after her brother Willie was born in 1933 (Willie later relocated their mother when he reached adulthood). Her father remarried and also moved away, leaving them to be raised by their paternal grandparents. The Nelsons, who taught singing back in Arkansas, started their grandchildren in music.

Nelson's grandmother started instructing her to play piano on a pump organ when Nelson was five. Her grandfather took her to singing gospel conventions that were held on the courthouse in Hillsboro, Texas, where she performed for the first time—in front of about a thousand people. When she was six, her grandfather, impressed by her potential talent, bought her a piano for $35 (equivalent to $784 in 2025). Three years later, she started playing with Willie and singing with her grandmother around the house. She began playing in functions at Abbott High School and in church with her brother. When she was fourteen, she began traveling with evangelists around Austin and throughout Texas.

== Music career ==
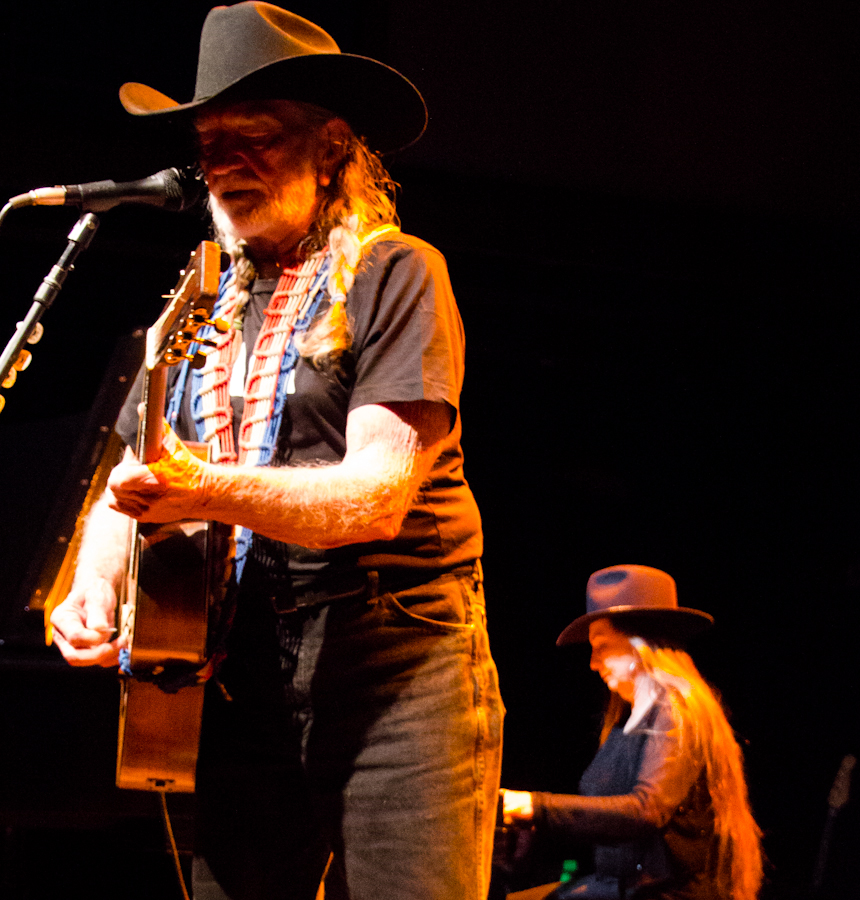
(L–R) Willie and Bobbie Nelson performing in concert in 2012

At age sixteen, Nelson met Bud Fletcher and they married. Although Fletcher did not have musical abilities, he formed his own band, Bud Fletcher and the Texans, limiting his participation to directing it. She joined on the piano, while her brother sang and played guitar. The band was dissolved in 1955 when she divorced Bud Fletcher, who was sick. She lost custody of her sons Randy, Michael, and Freddy for playing in honky-tonks and custody was given to her ex-husband's parents. When Fletcher died in a car accident in 1961, Nelson suffered a breakdown and was admitted to a hospital in Fort Worth. To retrieve custody of their children, she married again and started working in a television repair shop in town. The owner of the store rented a piano to comfort her as she recovered. She began working for the Hammond Organ Company, demonstrating and selling their products. She retrieved custody of her sons and moved to Austin, Texas. In 1965, after her third marriage failed, she visited Nashville, where her brother was working in his music career. She played in different restaurants and other venues until her brother called her from New York in 1973, where he was recording with Atlantic Records. She joined Willie on piano for the recordings, which eventually included the albums The Troublemaker, Shotgun Willie and Phases and Stages. She joined Willie Nelson's newly formed band, The Family, full-time and started touring with him.

Nelson released her solo debut album, Audiobiography, in 2008. Nine years later, she was inducted into the Texas Country Music Hall of Fame. In 2020, Nelson co-authored with her brother and writer David Ritz the autobiography Me and Sister Bobbie: True Tales of the Family Band. Nelson played her last show with her brother on October 9, 2021 in New Braunfels, Texas.

== Death ==
Nelson died in Austin, Texas, on March 10, 2022, at the age of 91.

== Discography ==
=== Albums ===
Year	Album	Label
2008	Audiobiography	Justice Records

=== Collaborations ===
Year	Album	Label
1986	I'd Rather Have Jesus	Arrival Records
1992	Gospel: Old Time Religion (reissue of I'd Rather Have Jesus)	Laserlight Digital
1996	How Great Thou Art	Finer Art Records
1997	Hill Country Christmas	Finer Art Records
2013	Farther Along: The Gospel Collection	Perdernales Records
2014	December Day: Willie's Stash, Vol. 1	Legacy Recordings
2021	The Willie Nelson Family	Legacy Recordings
2023	Loving You (with Amanda Shires)	Silver Knife/ATO Records

== Books ==
- Me and Sister Bobbie: True Tales of the Family Band (2020, ISBN 978-1-984-85413-1)
