= Bloody Mary Morning =

Single by Willie Nelson

from the album Phases and Stages
- B-side: "After the Fire Is Gone" (with Tracy Nelson)
- Released: February 1974
- Recorded: September 1973
- Genre: Country, country rock, bluegrass
- Length: 2:48
- Label: Atlantic
- Songwriter(s): Willie Nelson
- Producer(s): Jerry Wexler

Willie Nelson singles chronology
"I Still Can't Believe You're Gone" (1974)	"Bloody Mary Morning" (1974)	"Sister's Coming Come" (1974)

Audio sample
- file; help

"Bloody Mary Morning" is a song written and recorded by American country music singer Willie Nelson. Nelson wrote the song inspired by his struggles to become a "better parent". It was originally released in the 1970 RCA Records release Both Sides Now with the title "Bloody Merry Morning".

During a party in Nashville, Tennessee, in 1972, Nelson performed the song along with others he planned to include on an upcoming concept album. Nelson impressed another guest at the party, Atlantic Records vice-president Jerry Wexler. Wexler offered him a contract to be a part of the new country music division of Atlantic, which Nelson accepted after ending his unsuccessful run with RCA.

"Bloody Mary Morning" was included in Nelson's concept album Phases and Stages, where the meaning of the song was shifted by the context of the album, changing the theme to a man who is left by his wife. Released as a single, it peaked at number 17 in Billboard's Country singles in 1974, later becoming an essential part of Nelson's live performances repertoire.

== Background ==
Written by Nelson during his tenure with RCA Records, the song was first released by the label on his record Both Sides Now, in 1970. As other releases by Nelson at the time on RCA, the song failed to meet success. In 1972, during a trip to Nashville, Tennessee, Nelson attended a party in Harlan Howard's house, where he sang the song along with others that he planned to include in a concept album. Another guest was Atlantic Records vice-president Jerry Wexler, who previously had produced works for artists such as Ray Charles and Aretha Franklin. Wexler was interested in Nelson's music. In light of the opening of a country music division on Atlantic, he proceeded to offer him a contract that gave him more creative control than his deal with RCA. When Nelson was released from his RCA contract, he signed with Atlantic for US$25,000 per year, becoming the label's first country artist.

== Re-recording and release ==
The song was originally written by Nelson in 1970, inspired by his struggles to be a "good parent". For its inclusion in the concept album Phases and Stages, the song was re-recorded, changing the context to a man who was left by his woman, and decides to go to Houston, Texas from Los Angeles, California to forget her.

The first recording session took place in November 1973 in Muscle Shoals Sound Studios in Alabama. The recordings did not convince Rick Sanjek, who was in charge of A&R in Nashville. He persuaded Nelson to re-record all the tracks once again, including "Bloody Mary Morning", alleging that the songs sounded too "R&B". The tracks were re-recorded in late November.

"Bloody Mary Morning" was released as a single, peaking at number 17 in Billboard's Country singles. It was defined by the magazine as a "rollicking narrative". Following its success, the song became an essential part of Nelson's live performances repertoire.

Nelson recorded a rock version of the song with the band Supersuckers for the album Twisted Willie, released in 1996.

== Chart performance ==
Chart (1974)	Peak position
US Hot Country Songs (Billboard)	17
Canadian RPM Country Tracks	26
