= Whiskey River =

1972 single by Johnny Bush

Single by Johnny Bush

from the album Whiskey River
- B-side: "Right Back in Your Arms Again"
- Released: July 1972
- Genre: Country, roots country
- Length: 2:32
- Label: RCA Victor #0745
- Songwriter: Johnny Bush; Paul Stroud
- Producer: Jerry Bradley

Johnny Bush singles chronology
"I'll Be There" (1972)	"Whiskey River" (1972)	"There Stands the Glass" (1972)

"Whiskey River"

Single by Willie Nelson

from the album Willie and Family Live
- B-side: "Under the Double Eagle"
- Released: 1978
- Genre: Country, outlaw country, roots country
- Length: 3:38
- Label: Columbia #10877
- Songwriter: Johnny Bush; Paul Stroud
- Producer: Willie Nelson

Willie Nelson singles chronology
"There'll Be No Teardrops Tonight" (1978)	"Whiskey River" (1978)	"Sweet Memories" (1979)

"Whiskey River" is a song co-written and recorded by American country music singer Johnny Bush. It was a hit for both Bush and his friend Willie Nelson.

== Johnny Bush version ==
Bush released the song in 1972 through RCA Victor and included it on his album Whiskey River. Bush later re-recorded the song in 1981 and released it through the Delta label, with "When My Conscience Hurts the Most" on the b-side.

== Willie Nelson versions ==
Willie Nelson first recorded "Whiskey River" for the album Shotgun Willie in 1973 . In 1978, a recording from Nelson's live album Willie and Family Live was released as a single through Columbia Records. "Whiskey River", despite not being a Nelson original, has come to be regarded as one of his signature songs and a concert staple. "Whiskey River" has been the standard opening song during Nelson's concerts since "around 1974."

Nelson performed the song during the pilot episode of the long-running music television series Austin City Limits—marking the first song to be performed on the program.

== Chart performance ==
=== Johnny Bush ===
Chart (1972)	Peak position
US Hot Country Songs (Billboard)	14
Canadian RPM Country Tracks	7
Chart (1981)	Peak position
US Hot Country Songs (Billboard)	92

- ^{A}Re-recording.

=== Willie Nelson ===
Chart (1978)	Peak position
US Hot Country Songs (Billboard)	12
Canadian RPM Country Tracks	3

== In popular culture ==
Willie Nelson's version of the song is featured in Rockstar Games' Grand Theft Auto V game soundtrack.
