= Paul English (drummer) =

American musician (1932–2020)

- Born: Robert Paul English; November 6, 1932; Vernon, Texas, U.S.
- Died: February 11, 2020 (aged 87) Dallas, Texas, U.S.
- Genre: Country
- Instrument: Drums
- Years active: 1954–2020
- Formerly of: Willie Nelson

Robert Paul English (November 6, 1932 – February 11, 2020) was an American musician. He was Willie Nelson's longtime drummer who started playing with him in Fort Worth in 1955, although he did not become Nelson's regular drummer until 1966. In the years in between, he played with Delbert McClinton and others. In the early days, one of his duties was to serve as a strong armed collection agent for overdue payments from club owners for the band. He was the husband of second wife Janie English.

English was the titular "Paul" of the Willie Nelson album Me and Paul as well as the title track of that album. English had a role in Nelson's movie Red Headed Stranger (1986).

English joined Willie Nelson, John Mellencamp, and Neil Young as the first members of Farm Aid's board of directors in 1985, and he served as the organization's treasurer for many years.

English died on February 11, 2020, of acute pneumonia, at the age of 87.
