= My Heroes Have Always Been Cowboys (song) =

- UK release picture sleeve

Single by Willie Nelson

from the album The Electric Horseman: Music from the Original Motion Picture Soundtrack
- B-side: "Rising Star (Love Theme)"
- Released: January 1980
- Genre: Country
- Length: 3:06
- Label: Columbia Records
- Songwriter: Sharon Vaughn
- Producers: Willie Nelson; Sydney Pollack

Willie Nelson singles chronology
"Help Me Make It Through the Night" (1979)	"My Heroes Have Always Been Cowboys" (1980)	"Midnight Rider" (1980)

"My Heroes Have Always Been Cowboys" was recorded by Waylon Jennings on the 1976 album Wanted! The Outlaws and further popularized in 1980 by Willie Nelson as a single on the soundtrack to The Electric Horseman. "My Heroes Have Always Been Cowboys" was written by Sharon Vaughn and Nelson's version was his fifth number one on the country chart. The single stayed at number one for two weeks and spent a total of 14 weeks on the country chart.

Members of the Western Writers of America chose it as one of the Top 100 Western songs of all time.

== Content ==
The narrator compares his childhood dream of becoming a cowboy to the reality he faces after he realizes the hard truth of cowboy life, finding a strong contrast between the two.

== Chart performance ==
Chart (1980)	Peak position
US Hot Country Songs (Billboard)	1
US Billboard Hot 100	44
Canadian RPM Country Tracks	1
Canadian RPM Adult Contemporary Tracks	3

=== Year-end charts ===
Chart (1980)	Position
US Hot Country Songs (Billboard)	13
