= List of songs written by Willie Nelson =

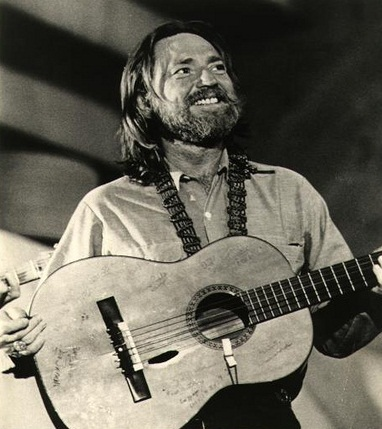
Nelson in 1974

This list contains songs written by American country singer-songwriter Willie Nelson, including those where he is credited as co-author. The 344 songs are arranged alphabetically.

== A ==
- A Moment Isn't Very Long
- A Penny For Your Thoughts
- Alice in Hulaland (co-written with Buddy Cannon)
- Albania Albania
- Always Now
- American Dream (co-written With Bob Dylan)
- Amnesia
- And So Will You My Love
- Angel Flying Too Close To The Ground
- Annie
- Any Old Arms Won't Do (co-written With Hank Cochran)
- Are You Ever Coming Home (co-written With Hank Cochran)
- Are You Sure (co-written With Buddy Emmons)
- Ashamed
- Au Jardin De Mes Reves (Albert Babin, rearranged)

== B ==
- Bach Minuet In G (rearranged)
- Back On The Road (co-written With Nathan Mackey)
- Back to Earth
- Baja Oklahoma (co-written With Dan Jenkins)
- Band of Brothers
- Bandera
- Bird (co-written With Robert Braddock, Hal Coleman, Barry Etris, Claude Putman, Jr. And John Bush Shinn III)
- Bird Medley
- Blame It On The Times
- Bloody Mary Morning
- Blue Rock Montana
- Blue Sar (co-written with Buddy Cannon)
- Both Ends Of The Candle
- Broken Promise
- Bring it On
- Buddy

== C ==
- Changing Skies
- Christmas Blues (co-written With Booker Jones)
- Christmas Prayer
- Cling To The Spark
- Cold Empty Spark
- Color of Sound (co-written with Micah Nelson)
- Come On Back Jesus
- Congratulations
- Country Willie
- Crazy
- Cry Softly Darling
- Crying In The Heart

== D ==
- Darkness On The Face Of The Earth
- Darling Are You Ever Coming Home
- December Day
- Denver
- Devil In A Sleeping Bag
- Did I Ever Love You
- Do Your Thing You're A Cowboy
- Don't Say Love Or Nothing
- Don't Touch Me There (co-written with Buddy Cannon)
- Down At The Corner Beer Joint
- Dream Come True
- Driving the Herd (co-written with Buddy Cannon)

== E ==
- Ehrbares Madchen
- El Niño
- Electric Horseman
- Eleven Dixie Mudcats
- End Of Understanding
- Energy Follows Thought (co-written with Buddy Cannon)
- Everybody's Baby
- Everything But You
- Everywhere I go

== F ==
- Face of a Fighter
- Family Bible
- Follow Me Around
- Following Me Around
- Forgiving You Was Easy
- Funny
- Funny How Time Slips Away

== G ==
- Ghost
- Go Away
- Goin' Home
- Good Hearted Woman (co-written With Waylon Jennings)
- Good Times
- Guitar in the Corner
- Great Divide

== H ==
- Half a Man
- Half Black Half Leopard
- Hands On The Wheel
- Happiness Lives Next Door
- Hard Edge Texas (co-written With Kris Kristofferson)
- He's Not For You
- Healing Hands Of Time
- Heartaches Of A Fool
- Heartland
- Heaven And Hell
- Heebie Jeebie Blues No. 2
- Hej Meddig
- Hello Darling
- Hello Fool
- Hello Wall Number 2
- Hello Walls
- Hero
- Hint Of Song
- Hold Me Tighter
- Home Is Where You're Happy
- Home Motel
- Homecoming In Heaven
- Hot Blooded Woman
- Hot Time In Music City Blues
- How Does It Feel
- How Long Is Forever
- How Much Does it Cost (co-written with Buddy Cannon)

== I ==
- I Am The Forest
- I Can Cry Again
- I Can Get Off On You
- I Can Still Reach Yesterday
- I Can't Find The Time
- I Didn't Sleep A Wink
- I Don't Feel Anything
- I Don't Go To Funerals (co-written with Buddy Cannon)
- I Don't Know Where I Am Today
- I Don't Know a Thing About Love
- I Don't Understand
- I Feel Sorry For Him
- I Gotta Get Drunk
- I Guard The Canadian Border
- I Guess I've Come To Live Here
- I Just Can't Let You Say Goodbye
- I Just Don't Understand
- I Just Stopped By
- I Let My Mind Wander
- I Live One Day At A Time
- I Never Cared For You
- I Should Have Kissed Her More
- I Still Can't Believe You're Gone
- I Thought About You
- I Thought I Left You
- I Want A Girl
- I Want To Be Alone
- I Write You Letters
- I'd Already Cheated On You
- I'd Rather You Didn't Love Me
- I'll Stay Around
- I'm A Memory
- I'm Building Heartaches
- I'm Falling In Love Again
- I'm Gonna Lose A Lot Of Teardrops
- I'm Not Trying To Forget You
- I'm So Ashamed
- I'm Still Not Over You
- I'm Waiting forever
- I’ve Got A Wonderful Future
- I’ve Just Destroyed The World
- I’ve Loved You All Over The World
- I’ve Seen All This World I Care to See
- If You Could Only See
- If You Really Loved Me
- In God's Eyes
- In The Car Again
- Is The Better Part Over
- Is There Something On Your Mind
- Island In The Sea
- It Could Be Said That Way
- It Should Be Easier Now
- It's A Dream Come True
- It's Not For Me To Understand
- It's Not Supposed To Be That Way
- It's Only Money (co-written with Buddy Cannon)

== J ==
- Jimmy's Road
- Jingle Bells (James Pierpont, rearranged)
- Just As I Am (Charlotte Elliott, William B. Bradbury)
- Just For The Moment

== K ==
- Kiss Me When You're Through (co-written with Buddy Cannon)
- Kneel At The Feet Of Jesus

== L ==
- Laying My Burdens Down
- Laws of Nature
- Lear And A Limo (co-written With Mickey Raphael)
- Leave Alone
- Let Me Be A Man
- Let My Heart Be Broken
- Let's Pretend We’re Strangers
- Little Old Fashioned Karma
- Little Things
- Live Every Day (co-written with Buddy Cannon)
- Local Memory
- Loco
- London
- Lonely Little Mansion
- Looking For A Place To Fall (co-written With Merle Haggard And Freddy Powers)
- Love Just Laughed (co-written with Buddy Cannon)

== M ==
- Makin's Of A Song (co-written With Max Barnes, Waylon Jennings And Troy Seals)
- Man With the Blues
- Mariachi
- Matador
- Me And Paul
- Mean Old Greyhound Bus
- Message
- Misery Mansion
- More Than One Way To Cry
- Mr. Record Man
- My Heart Was A Dancer (co-written with Buddy Cannon)
- My Kind Of Girl
- My Love
- My Love For The Rose
- My Own Peculiar Way

== N ==
- New Way To Cry
- Night Life
- No Love Around
- No Place for Me
- No Tomorrow In Sight
- Nobody Said It Was Going To Be Easy
- Nobody Slides My Friend

== O ==
- O’er The Waves (Juventino Rosas, rearranged)
- Old Age And Treachery
- On the Road Again
- On The Road Too Long
- Once Along
- Once Upon a Yesterday (co-written with Buddy Cannon)
- One Day At A Time
- One In A Row
- One Step Beyond
- Opportunity To Cry
- Our Chain Of Love
- Over You Again

== P ==
- Pages
- Part Where I Cry
- The Party's Over
- Permanently Lonely
- Pet Wrangler
- Phases, Stages, Circles, Cycles
- Pick Up The Pieces
- Pick Up The Tempo
- Place To Fall Apart (co-written With Merle Haggard And Freddy Powers)
- Pretend I Never Happened
- Pretty Paper
- Pride Wins Again
- Promises Promises
- Pullamo

== R ==
- Rainy Day Blues
- Raysha's Theme
- Remember The Good Times
- Ridge Top
- Right From Wrong
- Right To Dream ( co-written with Mariah Carey)
- Road Happy (co-written With Dolly Parton)
- Roll Me Up and Smoke Me When I Die
- Run Jody Run

== S ==
- Sad Songs And Waltzes
- Save Your Tears
- Send Me a Picture
- Shall We Gather
- She Always Comes Back To Me
- She Is Gone
- She Might Call
- She's Gone (co-written With Fred Foster)
- She's Not For You
- She's Still Gone (Shirley Nelson)
- Shelter Of My Arms
- Shotgun Willie
- Sister's Coming Home
- Sit On My Lap
- Sitting Here In Limbo (Written by Jimmy Cliff and Guilly Bright)
- Slow Down Old World
- So Much To Do
- So You Think You're A Cowboy
- Solidarity
- Some Other Time
- Somebody Pick Up My Pieces
- Someone Waiting For You
- Something To Think About
- Sometimes She Lies (Harlan Howard, rearranged)
- Somewhere In Texas
- Songwriter
- Sorrow Tearing Me Apart
- Sound In Your Mind
- Spirit I-iii
- Spirit Of E Nine
- Stage Coach Score (co-written With David Alan Coe)
- Still Is Still Moving To Me
- Storm Has Just Begun
- Storm Within My Heart
- Suffer In Silence
- Summer Of Roses

== T ==
- Take My Advice (co-written With David Alan Coe)
- Take My Word
- Talk To Me
- Tell It To Jesus
- Ten with a Two
- Texas
- That's What Children Are For
- That's Why I Love Her
- The Wall
- There Are Worse Things Than Be
- There Goes A Man
- There Is No Easy Way
- There shall be showers of blessing (written by Daniel Webster in 1883)
- There's A Way
- There's Gonna Be Love In My Home
- There's No Tomorrow In Sight
- There's Worse Things Than Being Alone
- These Are Difficult Times
- They're All The Same
- Things To Remember
- Three Days
- Time Of The Preacher
- To Make A Long Story Short (She's Gone)
- Today's Gonna Make A Wonderful
- Too Sick To Pray
- Too Young To Settle Down (co-written With Jack Rhodes)
- Touch Me
- Tougher Than Leather
- Truth Will Set You Free
- Turn Out The Lights (co-written By Hank Craig)
- Twice The Man (co-written With Edwin Griens And Maribeth Murray)
- Two Different Roads (Hank Cochran, Jan Crutchfield; rearranged)
- Two Sides To Every Story
- Two Stories Wide

== U ==
- Uncloudy Day (THE UNCLOUDED DAY - Original Lyrics & Music: Josiah K. Alwood, circa 1880)
- Undo The Right (co-written With Hank Cochran)
- Used to Her

== V ==
- Valentine
- Vir Ewig Is Ek Joune

== W ==
- Waiting Forever For You
- Waiting Time
- Wake Me When It's Over
- Walking
- Wanted On Mother (co-written With Harlan Howard)
- Wasted/Revenge
- We Don't Run
- We Look For Love
- We Wouldn't Have It Any Other Way
- What a Way to Live
- What Can You Do To Me Now (co-written With Hank Cochran)
- What Do You Think Of Her Now (co-written With Hank Cochran)
- What Do You Want Me To Do
- What If I'm Out of My Mind (co-written with Buddy Cannon)
- What Right Have I
- When I’ve Sung My Last Hillbilly
- When We Live Again
- Where Do You Stand
- Where Dreams Come to Die (co-written with Buddy Cannon)
- Where My House Lives
- Where's The Show
- White Cadillac Convertible Blue
- Who Do I Know In Dallas (co-written With Hank Cochran)
- Who'll Buy My Memories (co-written With Eddie Noack)
- Why Are You Picking On Me
- Why Do I Have To Choose
- Wilie Tuning
- Will You Remember
- Will You Remember Mine
- Within Your Crowd
- Wives and Girlfriends
- Wonderful Future
- Words Don't Fit The Picture
- Write Your Own Song

== Y ==
- Yesterday's Wine
- You Don't Think I'm Funny Anymore
- You Dream About Me
- You Left Me A Long, Long Time Ago
- You Memory Won't Die
- You Ought To Hear Me Cry
- You Took My Happiness Away
- You'll Always Have Someone (co-written With Hank Cochran)
- Your Country Boy
- You Wouldn't Cross The Street
