= The Party's Over (Willie Nelson song) =

Single by Willie Nelson
- B-side: "Make Way for a Better Man"
- Released: February 1967
- Recorded: June 1966 at RCA Studio B (Nashville, Tennessee)
- Genre: Country
- Length: 2:22
- Label: RCA Victor
- Songwriter: Willie Nelson
- Producer: Chet Atkins

Willie Nelson singles chronology
"I'm Still Not Over You" (1966)	"The Party's Over" (1967)	"Blackjack County Chain" (1967)

"The Party's Over" is a song written and recorded by American country music singer Willie Nelson during the mid-1950s. After arriving in Houston, Texas, Nelson was hired to play for the Esquire Ballroom band, where he would be allowed to close the shows singing the song. Guitar instructor and Nelson's friend Paul Buskirk forwarded the song to singer Claude Gray, who recorded the original version of the song, released as "My Party's Over" in 1959.

Nelson recorded the song himself in 1966, which was released as a single in February 1967. It reached number twenty-four on Billboard's Hot Country Singles, and it was included as the title track of Nelson's album. The song was later popularized by former Dallas Cowboys quarterback and Monday Night Football host Don Meredith, who often sang the first line of the song on the broadcasts when a team established an insurmountable lead.

== Background ==
In 1956, Nelson moved from Fort Worth, Texas to Portland, Oregon. He soon found a job on KVAN, in Vancouver, Washington, hosting the show The Western Express. Nelson became a popular DJ, while he continued to make live performances. During this time he wrote "The Party's Over".

When he moved to Houston, Texas, Nelson stopped by the Esquire Ballroom to sell his original songs to house band singer Larry Butler. Butler refused to purchase the songs, and instead signed Nelson to his band. Butler would at the end of the show let Nelson sing solo "The Party's Over" as a closer.

During his time in Fort Worth, Nelson was signed by Pappy Daily to D Records. While in Houston, he recorded sides for the label. Nelson was also hired by guitar instructor Paul Buskirk to work as an instructor in his school.

== Recordings ==
Buskirk convinced singer Claude Gray to record a set of original songs by Nelson, including "The Party's Over", "Night Life", "Family Bible" and "Leave Alone". Buskirk organized the session and hired the musicians, while Gray paid for the costs of the sessions US$100. Produced by Bill Quinn, the song was recorded on December 18, 1959, at Goldstar Studios. D Records issued the song as "My Party's Over", on the flipside of "Leave Alone" in May 1960.

Produced by Chet Atkins, Willie Nelson recorded the song in Nashville, Tennessee in June 1966. His backing consisted of guitarists Jerry Reed and Velma Smith, steel guitarist Buddy Emmons, pianist Hargus "Pig" Robbins, and bassist Junior Husky. From the four recorded tracks, "The Party's Over" was selected as the A-side of a single release.

The single was released in February 1967, with "Make Way for a Better Man" on the flipside. Billboard called the song a "plaintive ballad", and declared: "(Nelson) performs it to perfection. Should bring him right back to the top ten. The single entered the Hot Country Singles chart, and peaked at number twenty-four. The song was included as the title track of the album The Party's Over and Other Great Willie Nelson Songs.

The song was later popularized by former Dallas Cowboys quarterback Don Meredith, who in the 1970s was a color analyst on ABC's Monday Night Football. After a key play that ended the possibilities of the other team winning the game, Meredith would sing part of the song: "Turn out the lights, the party's over". Nelson later re-recorded the song for his 1982 album Always on My Mind. It was released as a single, on the B-side of the title track.

== Chart performance ==
Chart (1967)	Peak position
Billboard Hot Country Singles	24
