= The Party's Over =

The Party's Over may refer to:

== Politics ==
- Se Acabó La Fiesta (translated in English as "The Party Is Over"), Spanish right wing political party

== Film and TV ==
- The Party's Over (1934 film), starring Stuart Erwin and Ann Sothern, based on the 1933 Broadway play
- The Party's Over (1965 film), directed by Guy Hamilton, starring Oliver Reed, with a score by John Barry
- The Party's Over (1991 film), written and directed by Alessandro Benvenuti
- The Party's Over (2001 film), political documentary
- "The Party's Over" (CSI: NY), a 2009 television episode
- "The Party's Over" (My Hero), a 2000 television episode

== Albums ==
- The Party's Over (Murphy's Law album), 2001
- The Party's Over (Smoking Popes album), 2001
- The Party's Over (Talk Talk album), 1982
- The Party's Over...Thanks for Coming, 1993 album by The Party
- The Party's Over and Other Great Willie Nelson Songs, 1967 album by Willie Nelson

== Songs ==
- "The Party's Over" (1956 song), by Jule Styne, Betty Comden and Adolph Green
- "The Party's Over" (Sandra Reemer song), 1976
- "The Party's Over" (Willie Nelson song)
- "The Party's Over (Hopelessly in Love)", a song by Journey from Captured

== Other uses ==
- "The Party's Over, Isla de Señorita", a television episode of Adventure Time
- The Party's Over: Oil, War, and the Fate of Industrial Societies, a 2003 book by Richard Heinberg

== See also ==
- Party's Over, a 2017 EP by Astrid S
- "Party's Over" (Raspberries song), a 1974 song by the Raspberries from the album Starting Over
- The Party Is Over, a 1960 Argentine drama film
- When the Party's Over (disambiguation)
