= Family Bible (song) =

1960 single by Claude Gray

Single by Claude Gray
- B-side: "Crying in the Night"
- Released: February 1960
- Recorded: December 18, 1959
- Studio: Gold Star (Houston, Texas)
- Genre: Country, gospel
- Length: 2:55
- Label: D 1118
- Songwriters: Willie Nelson (Attributed to Paul Buskirk, Claude Gray and Walt Breeland)

Claude Gray singles chronology
"Best Part of Me" (1959)	"Family Bible" (1960)	"My Party's Over" (1960)

"Family Bible"

Single by George Jones
- B-side: "Taggin' Along"
- Released: December 1960
- Recorded: 1960
- Genre: Country, gospel
- Length: 3:01
- Label: Mercury 71721
- Songwriters: Willie Nelson (credited to Claude Gray, Walter Breeland, Paul Buskirk)
- Producer: Pappy Daily

George Jones singles chronology
"The Window Up Above" (1960)	"Family Bible" (1960)	"Tender Years" (1961)

"Family Bible" is a song written by country music singer-songwriter Willie Nelson. Nelson began writing the song in 1957, while he enjoyed success as a disc jockey in KVAN, in Vancouver, Washington. After being denied a raise by the station, he moved to Houston, Texas. Due to financial issues he sold the song to Paul Buskirk.

Upon purchasing the song, Buskirk took it to singer Claude Gray. Gray's recording of the song reached number seven on Billboard's Hot Country Singles. Fueled by the success of the record, Nelson moved to Nashville, Tennessee, where he enjoyed recognition for writing the song. It became part of Nelson's live performance set, and he recorded it for the first time himself for his 1971 album Yesterday's Wine.

== Background and writing ==
In 1956, Nelson moved from Fort Worth, Texas to Portland, Oregon. He soon found a job on KVAN, in Vancouver, Washington, hosting the show The Western Express. Nelson became a popular DJ, while he continued to make live performances.

During this time he started writing "Family Bible". His inspiration for the song came from his grandmother, Nancy Elizabeth Smothers, who would sing "Rock of Ages" and read from the Bible after supper. Nelson played the demo of the song that he had recorded on a reel-to-reel tape machine for Mae Boren Axton after interviewing her on the show. Impressed by Nelson's songwriting, Axton recommended that he go to Nashville and dedicate himself to songwriting full-time. Nelson quit the job at the radio station after being denied a raise in 1957, moving later to Houston.

== Houston and song's success ==
On his way to Houston, Nelson stopped by the Esquire Ballroom to sell his original songs to house band singer Larry Butler. Butler refused to purchase the songs, including "Family Bible", for US$10 apiece. Instead, he signed Nelson to his band. During his time in Fort Worth, Nelson was signed by Pappy Daily to D Records. While in Houston, he recorded sides for the label. Nelson was also hired by guitar instructor Paul Buskirk to work as an instructor in his school. After having dinner with Buskirk at a Pasadena restaurant, Nelson did not have money to pay the check. He sang "Family Bible" to Buskirk, and offered to sell the song to him for US$50 and the cost of his bill. To help Nelson with his financial issues, Buskirk purchased the song.

Buskirk convinced singer Claude Gray to record a set of original songs by Nelson, including "Family Bible", "Night Life", "The Party's Over", and "Leave Alone". Buskirk organized the session and hired the musicians. Buskirk also sold a share of "Family Bible" to Gray for US$100. Produced by Bill Quinn, the song was recorded on December 18, 1959, at Gold Star Studios in Houston, Texas. It was released by D Records in February 1960 and reached number seven on Billboard's Hot Country Singles. Billboard called the song "very well done", giving it a rating of three stars out of five.

Family Bible
Nelson's recording of the song on his 1971 album Yesterday's Wine

When it was first published, the song did not include any credit to Nelson as the songwriter. Instead it listed Paul Buskirk, Claude Gray, and Walt Breeland. Nelson later declared that he did not feel any regrets for selling the song, stating, "I felt if I could write one hit song, I could write another". Taking advantage of Gray's hit, Nelson moved to Nashville. The song garnered him recognition as a songwriter. He recorded the song himself for the first time in his 1971 album Yesterday's Wine. In 1980 he used "Family Bible" as the title track of his gospel album, and released it as a single the same year. The song became one of Nelson's recurring numbers during live performances.

Commander Cody and His Lost Planet Airmen recorded a version on their debut album "Lost in the Ozone" in 1971 on Paramount. MCA reissued in 1977, 1980 and 2000.

George Jones also recorded a version of the song for Mercury Records, which reached No. 16 on the country singles chart.

== Chart performance ==
=== Claude Gray ===
Year	Chart	Peak position
1961	Hot Country Songs	7

=== Willie Nelson ===
Year	Chart	Peak position
1980	Hot Country Songs	92
