= The Longhorn Jamboree Presents: Willie Nelson & His Friends =

Studio album by Willie Nelson
- Released: April 1, 1976
- Recorded: 1975
- Genre: Country
- Label: Plantation

Willie Nelson chronology
What Can You Do to Me Now (1975)	The Longhorn Jamboree Presents: Willie Nelson & His Friends (1976)	Willie – Before His Time (1977)

Professional ratings
Review scores
Source	Rating
Allmusic	2/5 stars

The Longhorn Jamboree Presents: Willie Nelson & His Friends is a 1976 album recorded by country singer and composer Willie Nelson.

== Track listing ==
1. "What a Way to Live"
2. "Misery Mansion"
3. "Rainy Day Blues"
4. "Night Life"
5. "Man With the Blues"
6. "The Storm Has Just Begun"
7. "Mississippi Woman" (Red Lane)
8. "West Virginia Man" (Coe)
9. "What'd I Say" (Ray Charles)
10. "Save the Last Dance for Me" (Doc Pomus, Mort Shuman)
11. "Honey Don't" (Perkins)
12. "Blue Suede Shoes" (Perkins)

Tracks 1–6 performed by Willie Nelson, 7–8 by David Allan Coe, 9–10 by Jerry Lee Lewis, 11–12 by Carl Perkins

== Personnel ==
- Willie Nelson - Vocals, Guitar
