= KISN =

KISN may refer to:

- The ICAO code for Sloulin Field International Airport in Williston, North Dakota, United States
- KISN (FM), a radio station (96.7 FM) licensed to serve Belgrade, Montana, United States
- KISN-LP, a low-power radio station (95.1 FM) licensed to serve Portland, Oregon, United States
- KISN (Portland), defunct AM and FM radio stations in Portland, Oregon
- KZHT, a radio station (97.1 FM) licensed to serve Salt Lake City, Utah, United States, which used the call sign KISN or KISN-FM until January 2004
