= Wade Ray =

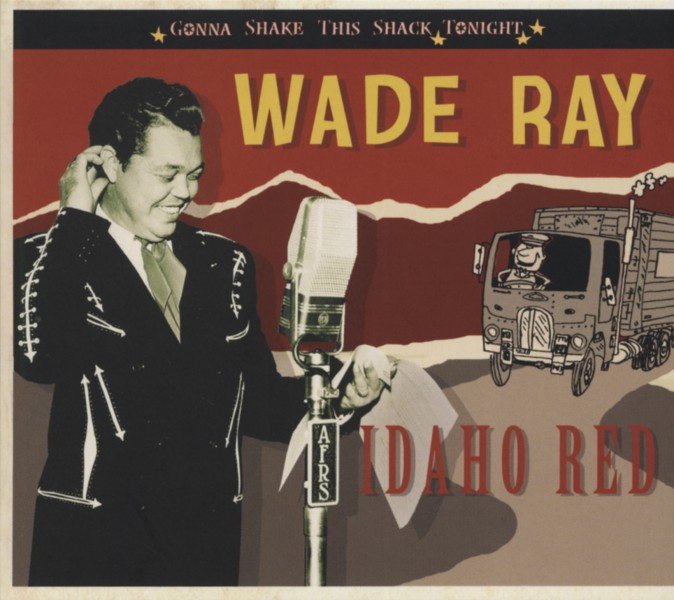
- Wade Ray on the Cover of Idaho Red album

Background information
- Born: Lyman Wade Ray; April 13, 1913; Griffin, Indiana U.S.
- Died: November 11, 1998 (aged 85) Sparta, IL, U.S.
- Genres: Western Swing
- Instruments: Vocals, fiddle

Wade Ray (April 13, 1913 in Evansville, Indiana – November 11, 1998 in Sparta, IL) was an American Western Swing fiddler and vocalist. His bands, the Wade Ray Five, Wade Ray And His Ozark Mountain Boys, etc., included musicians such as Kenneth Carllile and Curly Chalker. He retired to Sparta, Illinois in 1979 where he died in 1998.

== Discography ==
Singles

- "Are You Fer It?" B "Walk Softly", Wade Ray And His Ozark Mountain Boys 1951
- Let Me Go, Devil, first recorded on July 2, 1953, by Wade Ray, followed a few weeks later by Georgie Shaw, Johnny Bond and Tex Ritter
- "Wild Heart", written by Cindy Walker, B "Little Green Valley" RCA Victor 1957
- "Idaho Red", the first 'trucker song', 1953

Appearances on other artists' recordings

- Country Favorites-Willie Nelson Style
- The Gordons (duo)
- Kenneth C. "Jethro" Burns The RCA Camden LP
- Make Way for Willie Nelson
