= XHBC =

XHBC may refer to:

- XHBC-FM, a radio station (105.7 FM) in Ciudad Guzmán, Jalisco, Mexico
- XHBC-TDT, a television station (channel 14, virtual 4) in Mexicali, Baja California, Mexico
