= The Storm Has Just Begun =

Single by Willie Nelson
- A-side: "Man With the Blues"
- Released: July 9, 1959
- Recorded: 1959 at Manco Studio (Fort Worth, Texas)
- Genre: Country
- Length: 2:41
- Label: D
- Songwriter: Willie Nelson

"The Storm Has Just Begun" is a song by country music singer-songwriter Willie Nelson. Nelson wrote the song at the age of twelve. While working for KBOP in Pleasanton, Texas, in 1955, the song was one of the first two ever recorded by Nelson.

After two of his demos with the song were rejected, Nelson cut the song during his first session as a recording artist for D Records in Fort Worth, Texas. The song was released as the B-side to "Man With the Blues". It was later covered by Billy Walker the same year.

== Background ==
The "Storm Has Just Begun" was written by Nelson in his hometown of Abbott, Texas when he was twelve years old and played for the local polka band. In 1955, Nelson moved to Pleasanton, Texas, where he auditioned for a disc jockey job in KBOP.

With the equipment of the station, Nelson made his first two recordings. He recorded "The Storm Has Just Begun" along with "When I've Sung My Last Hillbilly Song". He recorded the tracks on a used reel-to-reel tape, over a farm market report that could be heard under the song. He sent the demos to Charlie Fitch, head of the local label SARG Records. Fitch rejected Nelson's recordings.Encouraged by his mother, Nelson then sent a demo containing the song to Grandpappy Smith, owner of the Melody Ranch dance hall in Eugene, Oregon. Smith, who also owned recording labels, booked Nelson to play in his hall in May 1955. After the date, Nelson did not receive a recording contract nor was he booked again on the venue.

== Recordings ==
Years after, in 1958, Nelson recorded the song during his first session with D Records for a single release. Recorded at Manco Studio in Fort Worth, Texas the song backed the A-side "Man With the Blues". The single was credited to "Willie Nelson and the Reil Sisters". The single was released in 1959

Billy Walker cut the song as "The Storm Within My Heart", the flip side of his 1959 single "A Woman Like You". Billboard described the track on its July 1959 review as a "traditional approach on a weeper ballad [...] (an) attractive side". The song was recorded by Nelson again in 1976, included in his album The Longhorn Jamboree Presents: Willie Nelson & His Friends.
