= DeNicola's =

Italian restaurant in Portland, Oregon, U.S.

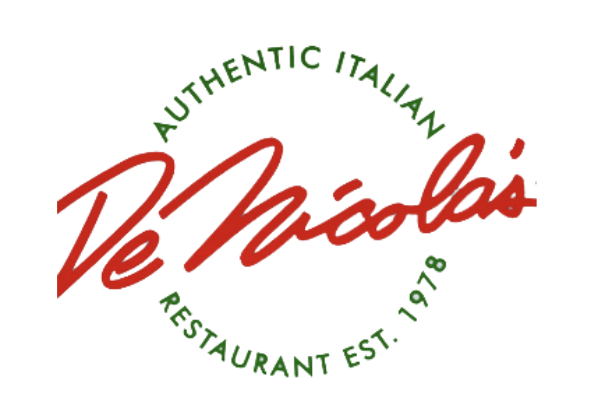

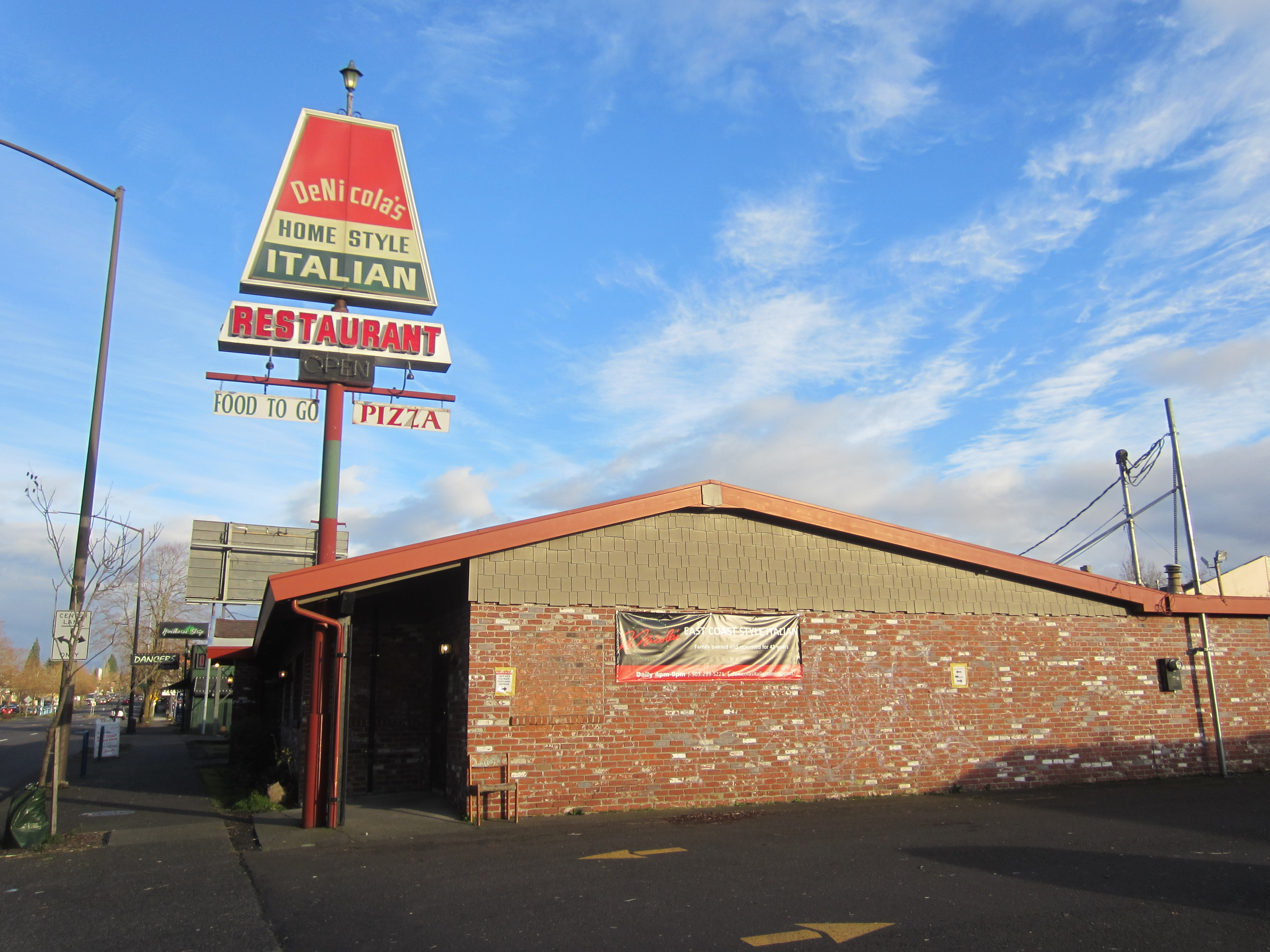
- The restaurant's exterior, 2021
- Interactive map of DeNicola's

Restaurant information
- Established: 1978
- Owner: Donata DeNicola-Barrett
- Previous owners: Giovanni and Rosa De Nicola
- Food type: Italian
- Location: 3520 Southeast Powell Boulevard, Portland, Multnomah, Oregon, 97202, United States
- Coordinates: 45.4968°N 122.6284°W
- Website: denicolasitaliandining.com

DeNicola's Italian Restaurant, or simply DeNicola's, is a family-owned Italian restaurant in Portland, Oregon, United States. The restaurant was established by Giovanni and Rosa De Nicola in 1978.

== Description ==
The family-owned Italian restaurant DeNicola's operates in a red brick house on Powell Boulevard in southeast Portland's Creston-Kenilworth neighborhood. The interior has red-checkered tablecloths, maps of Italy, a booth with a framed portrait of the current owner, and other family photographs on display. The menu includes traditional cuisine such as antipasto, chicken cacciatore, eggplant parmesan, garlic bread, lasagna, manicotti, pizza, ravioli, spaghetti and meatballs, salads, seafood, veal, vegetables, and wine.

== History ==
Giovanni and Rosa De Nicola, who immigrated from Pietragalla to the United States during World War II, opened DeNicola's in 1978. DeNicola's once had five locations. The remaining restaurant is operated by Donata DeNicola-Barrett, alongside her brother and sons. Her husband John Barrett is also a business partner.

Ini 2015, Donna DeNicola offered free pizza for life as part of a house purchase. For Pizza Week in 2016, DeNicola's served a vegetarian slices with marinara, mozzarella, pesto, ricotta, and balsamic vinaigrette. For the same event in 2017, the Best of Italy II slice had kalamata olives, marinara, pesto, ricotta, and a balsamic glaze. DeNicola's participated in Pizza Week again in 2019.

DeNicola's used to offer an all-you-can-eat spaghetti special on Tuesdays. The restaurant has sponsored the radio station KISN-LP.

== Reception ==
In 2016, Erik Henriksen of the Portland Mercury said "every inch of [DeNicola's] glows with a comfortable, heartwarming authenticity that New Portland can't hope to equal". In 2021, Andrea Damewood of Willamette Week wrote, "The food is not subtle or refined, but you're not here for that. I loved the meatballs, which were the right blend of spice and meat-to-binder ratio." In the newspaper's 2024 overview of "Old Portland's most beloved" restaurants, Robin Bacior and Aaron Mesh said the garlic bread was the menu's "superstar" and the city's best. DeNicola's was featured by "America's Best Restaurants", which highlights independently owned eateries in the U.S., in 2024.

== See also ==
- List of Italian restaurants
