= Hot Blooded Woman (disambiguation) =

"Hot Blooded Woman" is a 2005 song by Vanessa Petruo.

Hot Blooded Woman may also refer to:

- Hot Blooded Woman (1965 film), with Bill Thurman
- "Hot Blooded Woman", a 1981 song by Tony Caso
- "Hot-Blooded Woman", a 1978 song by Geraldine Hunt
- "Hot-Blooded Woman", a song written by Willie Nelson
- "Hot-Blooded Woman", a song by John Henry Hopkins from the 1966 album Lightning Hopkins with His Brothers Joel and John Henry / with Barbara Dane
