= What a Way to Live (song) =

Single by Willie Nelson
- B-side: "Misery Mansion"
- Released: May 1960
- Recorded: March 11, 1960 at Gold Star Studio (Houston, Texas)
- Genre: Country
- Length: 2:54
- Label: D
- Songwriter: Willie Nelson

Willie Nelson singles chronology
"Man With the Blues" (1959)	"What a Way to Live" (1960)	"Nite Life" (1960)

"What a Way to Live" is a song written by country music singer Willie Nelson. He recorded the song on his second session with D Records, after moving to Houston, Texas. Produced by Bill Quinn, it was cut at Gold Star Studios in March 1960.

A cover version by Johnny Bush was recorded in 1967. Bush's version became a success, peaking at number twenty-nine on Billboard's Hot Country Singles.

== Background ==
In 1959, Nelson moved from Fort Worth, Texas to Houston. Just arrived in town, Nelson visited the Esquire Ballroom, where he tried to sell his original songs to bandleader Larry Butler. Instead of buying the songs, Butler offered Nelson to join his band, The Sunset Playboys. By that time, Nelson also befriended Paul Buskirk, who just had founded the "Paul Buskirk School of Guitar". Buskirk hired Nelson as an instructor.

Nelson had moved to Houston to advance as a performer and writer, and to be closer to the office of his newly signed label, D Records, and its publishing house, Glad Music. During his first D Records session in Fort Worth, Nelson had recorded "Man With the Blues".

== Recordings ==
On March 11, 1960, his second session with the label took place at Gold Star Studios, produced by Bill Quinn. On the recording of "What a Way to Live", Nelson was backed by Paul Buskirk on guitar, steel guitarist Ozzie Middleton, fiddlers Darold Raley and Clyde Brewer, bassist Dean Reynolds and drummer Al Hagy. Released in May 1960, the single was not a success. As part of the deal that Nelson made with Uncle Hank Craig to sign him to D Records, Craig received part of the proceeds of the single.

In 1967, Johnny Bush recorded a cover version for the label Stop Records. Backed by steel guitarist Jimmy Day, fiddlers Tommy Jackson and Buddy Spicher and bassist Junior Husky. Bush sang his own harmony. The shuffle beat was set to a 4/4 bass. The song debuted on Billboard's Hot Country Singleson March 16, 1968, and peaked at twenty-nine. It remained on the chart for thirteen weeks.

Mark Chesnutt also recorded a version of the song on his 1994 album of the same name.

== Chart performance ==
=== Johnny Bush ===
Chart	Peak position
Billboard Hot Country Singles	29
