= The Party's Over and Other Great Willie Nelson Songs =

Studio album by Willie Nelson
- Released: 1967
- Genre: Country gospel
- Length: 27:07
- Label: RCA Victor
- Producer: Chet Atkins

Willie Nelson chronology
Make Way for Willie Nelson (1967)	The Party's Over and Other Great Willie Nelson Songs (1967)	Texas in My Soul (1968)

The Party's Over and Other Great Willie Nelson Songs is the sixth studio album by country singer Willie Nelson.

== Background ==
By 1967, Nelson had enjoyed immense success as a songwriter, penning “Crazy” for Patsy Cline and “Pretty Paper” for Roy Orbison, but had enjoyed only middling success as a recording artist himself. His most recent album, Make Way for Willie Nelson, had produced the Top 20 single “One In a Row,” but his sales paled in comparison to other country stars like Marty Robbins and Johnny Cash. As he later put it, “For all my songwriting success, my RCA albums languished on the shelves. I was far from what you’d call a superstar. I wasn’t playing concert halls or arenas. I was playing beer joints.” Nelson was becoming increasingly unhappy with RCA, feeling the label did not promote his records enough and kept him around so his stable mates could pillage his poor-selling albums for material. In Nelson's first autobiography Atkins admitted, "I was just about the worst at promotion and sales. I didn't care anything about that part of the business. What time I wasn't in the studio, I was off somewhere playing my guitar...It hurt Willie a lot to have a guy with my attitude about sales as the one who was supposed to push his product." Nelson’s inability to create his live sound on record would remain a source of frustration for him in the years ahead.

== Recording and composition ==
Chet Atkins, who delegated responsibilities to Felton Jarvis for Nelson’s previous LP, returned as producer for The Party's Over and Other Great Willie Nelson Songs. Nelson managed to have two members from his band, steel guitarist Jimmy Day and drummer Johnny Bush, participate in the recording sessions, although Atkins said no to the using Nelson's full band in the studio. Unlike his last two albums, which were dominated by cover songs, The Party's Over boasted only original compositions. The title track had been written years earlier when Nelson had been living in Houston and was part of a two week songwriting spurt that saw him also write "Funny How Time Slips Away", "Crazy", "Mr. Record Man", and "I Gotta Get Drunk". It reached number 24 on the singles chart. A second single, "Blackjack County Chain", which had been written for Nelson by Red Lane, was climbing the country singles chart at number 21 when radio stations started banning the record for its grisly content. "I'll Stay Around" was co-written with Hank Cochran, who helped get Nelson a job writing for Pamper Music when the Texan first arrived in Nashville in 1960.

== Reception ==
Jim Worbois of AllMusic enthuses, “The title track sums up this album perfectly. This is one of those records that sounds incredible at 2 o'clock in the morning when one is feeling reflective after a busy night.” Nelson biographer Joe Nick Patoski deems it “not Willie’s most stellar work.”

Professional ratings
Review scores
Source	Rating
AllMusic	4.5/5 stars

== Track listing ==
All tracks composed by Willie Nelson, except where noted.

1. "Suffer in Silence"
2. "Hold Me Tighter"
3. "Go Away"
4. "Ghost"
5. "To Make a Long Story Short (She's Gone)" (Fred Foster, Nelson)
6. "A Moment Isn't Very Long"
7. "The Party's Over"
8. "There Goes a Man"
9. "Once Alone"
10. "No Tomorrow in Sight"
11. "I'll Stay Around" (Hank Cochran, Nelson)
12. "End of Understanding"

== Personnel ==
- Willie Nelson – guitar, vocals
- Jim Malloy – engineer

== Bibliography ==
- Nelson, Willie; Shrake, Bud (1988). Willie: An Autobiography. Simon and Schuster. ISBN 978-0671680756.
- Nelson, Willie; Ritz, David (2015). It's A Long Story: My Life. Little, Brown and Company. ISBN 9780316339315.
- Patoski, Joe Nick (2008). Willie Nelson: An Epic Life. Hachette Digital. ISBN 978-0-316-01778-7.
- Streissguth, Michael (2013). Outlaw: Waylon, Willie, Kris, and the Renegades of Nashville. HarperCollins. ISBN 978-0062038180.
