= KISN (Vancouver, Washington) =

Radio station in Vancouver, Washington (1959–1976)

- Vancouver, Washington; United States
- Broadcast area: Portland, Oregon
- Frequency: 910 kHz
- Branding: 91-derful KISN, Yours Truly KISN, The Mighty 91

Programming
- Language: English
- Format: Top 40

Ownership
- Owner: Star Stations; (Star Broadcasting)
- Sister stations: KOIL Omaha, WIFE Indianapolis

History
- First air date: November 1939
- Last air date: September 2, 1976
- Former call signs: KVAN (1939–1959)
- Former frequencies: 880 kHz (1939–1941)
- Call sign meaning: "Kissin'"

Technical information
- Power: 5,000 watts

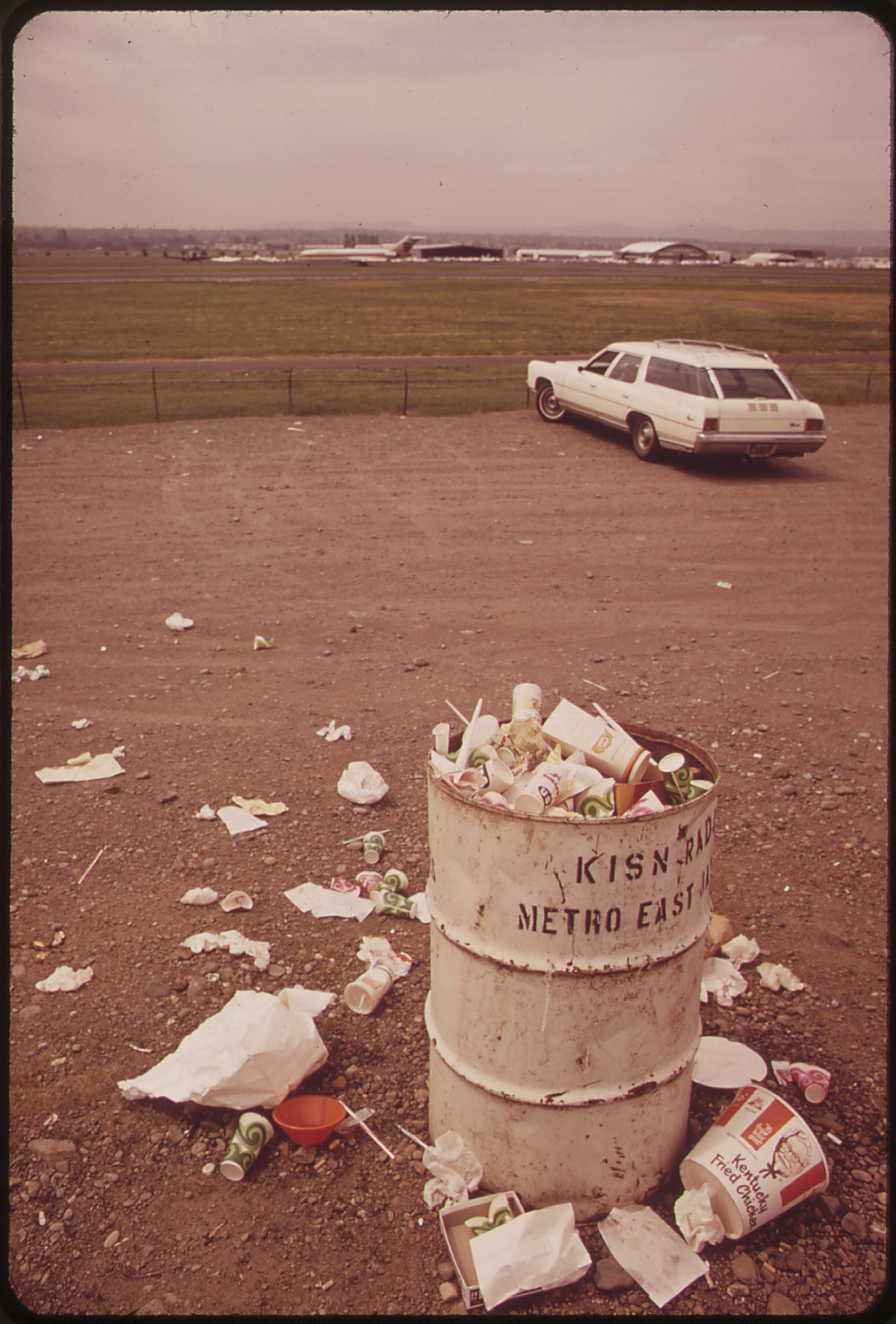
Viewing site for Portland Airport with KISN Radio trash barrel, 1973

KISN was an AM radio station licensed to Vancouver, Washington and broadcasting to Portland, Oregon, broadcasting on 910 kHz and licensed for 5,000 watts. The station began broadcasting in 1939 as KVAN, but after it changed formats to Top 40 and became KISN in 1959, KISN became not only the number one rated rock station in the market (the station followed a Top 50 playlist), but at times the most popular radio station in Portland. In 1976, the FCC revoked KISN's license and others owned by the Star Stations group due to a series of indiscretions involving connections to candidates for the United States Senate in Indiana and Oregon. The KISN call letters have been used several times for oldies radio stations in the Portland area, most recently by KISN-LP, a Low-power broadcasting station that has been on the air since 2015 with a format that recalls the original.

== History ==
=== KVAN ===
KVAN signed on in November 1939. It operated on 880 kHz and was built by Sheldon F. Sackett, who promptly sold a majority share in the new outlet to its first manager, Walter L. Read. The station initially broadcast with 250 watts during the day only; it changed frequencies to 910 kHz in 1941 when NARBA took effect. Read retired in 1940, and Sackett bought back the shares; the next year, KVAN was authorized for a power increase to 500 watts. Two years later, Sackett filed to move KVAN to 930 kHz and broadcast at night for the first time, but this was denied by the FCC. Instead, three years later, the commission allowed the station to broadcast with 1,000 watts day and night. The station stayed on the air during the 1948 flood of the Columbia River by hoisting its transmitter to the ceiling.

While KVAN's studios were in Vancouver, the transmitter had been moved to the Oregon side of the state line after going to 1,000 watts in 1947. For the station, that posed a regulatory problem. Despite being a Washington company running a station licensed to Washington, when the station took advertising from a Washington brewery, the Oregon Liquor Control Commission claimed jurisdiction over the station because the transmitter was in Oregon. At the time, state law did not allow liquor advertising before 10 p.m., and that prompted the station to lose the advertiser.

By the early 1950s, KVAN aired a country and western format; Willie Nelson was one of the DJs. He financed his own first single, "No Place for Me"; the record was backed with "Lumberjack" written by Leon Payne, who was also a DJ at the station.

KVAN planned for a venture into television in the early 1950s. In 1952, it filed an application for the channel 21 allocation to Portland opposite the one made by Mt. Scott Telecasters, owners of KGON (1520 AM). KVAN prevailed, and though Sackett predicted that KVAN-TV would go on the air January 15, 1954, it did not. In 1955, Sackett announced he would open a new tabloid newspaper in Portland to complement KVAN-AM-TV; by this point, the station was allowed to originate 51 percent of its programming from its Portland transmitter. The tabloid did not materialize, either; by late 1956, KVAN was engaged in a fight to move the channel 2 allocation from Portland across the Columbia River in an attempt to move from UHF to VHF.

=== Sale to Star Stations ===
In 1959, Sackett sold KVAN to the Star Stations, which was headed by Don W. Burden and owned stations in Omaha, Denver and Pocatello, Idaho, for $580,000. For Sackett, the sale of KVAN was about focusing on the newspaper business; at the same time, he sold another holding, KROW in Oakland, California, to Gordon McLendon. Burden wasted no time changing everything at KVAN. After stunting with a 24-hour loop of "Teenage Bill of Rights" by Robby John and the Seven-Teens, which listed as "terrible music", and asked listeners in the listening area, "Do you want a revolution?", KVAN became a "new" Top 40 station, with its call-letters changed to KISN on May 1, 1959, with a $40,000 promotion blitz and plans to move the entire studio setup to Portland. Later during that year, the "KISN Corner" opened at 10th and West Burnside streets, featuring a street-level studio where passersby could look in.

KISN was Portland's first Top 40 station, and it was an immediate success, finishing first in the ratings in 1960. During one rating book in 1963, the station held 86 percent of the audience. However, it was still licensed to Vancouver, and its attempts to identify as a Portland station resulted in an FCC fine of $2,000 in 1962. Three years later, the commission ordered the station to cease and desist from linking itself to Portland on its air and fined the station $20,000. In January 1966, KISN was allowed to increase power to 5,000 watts and relocate its transmitter site to 4615 NE 158th Avenue, east of the Portland International Airport with power increased to 5,000 directional watts. Star also filed that year for an FM station on 103.3 FM in Portland.

Several stars passed through KISN in its Top 40 years, including "The Real" Don Steele, who came to KISN from KOIL.

=== Renewal fight and closure ===
While KISN had problems with its station identification, they were of lesser magnitude than the problems that had led to WIFE in Indianapolis being granted a series of short-term renewals, the last being a six-month probationary renewal in 1969. On December 2, 1970, after a nine-month internal review, the FCC put all five Star Stations' license renewals up for hearing in a consolidated proceeding with an application to start a new station on WIFE's frequency. The commission would cover 22 issues in the hearing, including charges of illegal gifts of air time and coverage to Senator Vance Hartke of Indiana during his 1964 reelection campaign and a contribution to Senator Mark Hatfield of Oregon in 1966 and directed the Star stations in those markets to promote those candidates. One issue struck at the heart of political corruption: according to the order, on the day in 1966 that county commissioners in Multnomah County, Oregon, overrode the planning commission to approve a new KISN transmitter site, Burden asked an employee to send him $10,000, in $100 bills, for the purpose of contributing to the commissioners that had supported the measure. Rounding out the order were additional questions over harassment of former employees, supervision of on-air contests, and lack of candor with the FCC.

After multiple years of conflicting rulings, on January 31, 1975, the FCC voted 5–1 against the Star Stations on all counts, denying all five license renewals. Burden's appeals to federal court were rejected, and the FCC ordered all Star Stations to cease broadcasting on September 2.

After evening air personality Dave "Records" Stone said "Good night from the KISN Good Guys", the station was not even allowed to complete its last song, The Supremes' "Someday We'll Be Together", ending up going silent at 12:01 a.m. KISN was the primary station of the Emergency Broadcast System in Southwest Washington.

== 910 kHz after KISN ==
After the FCC revoked the KISN license, four applications were received for the vacated frequency, from Rose Broadcasting, Viking Vancouver, Fort Vancouver Broadcasting and Longwood Broadcasting; the agency designated these applications for comparative hearing on July 12, 1978. The applicants merged in 1979 under the Fort Vancouver Broadcasting application, enabling the FCC to issue a construction permit. The new station took the call letters KKSN—the KISN calls having been assigned to 97.1 FM in Salt Lake City, Utah, on May 8, 1978— and began broadcasting April 1, 1980, trading on the "Mighty 91" name and KISN heritage. Former KISN sales manager Bill Failing served as the first general manager of the new KKSN.

== Revivals of KISN in Portland ==
=== "97.1 KISN-FM" ===
In 1988, then-KKLI 97.1, licensed to Portland, Oregon, became KKSN-FM and started broadcasting golden oldies with the same "kissin'" pronunciation of the station name. Dave "Records" Stone, the last of the original KISN disc jockeys, broadcast a Saturday specialty oldies program that included air checks from the original station plus unlimited presentations of "forgotten 45s" by his friend and assistant, Dirty Dave the Record Slave. The FM station (now KYCH-FM) changed to an adult hits format in 2005. The oldies format would return to the AM station until its final demise in 2007. The last moments of Stone's original 1976 farewell - "Good Night, from the KISN Good Guys!" - was used to close this station.

=== Internet revival project ===
In Spring 2009, surviving staff members celebrated 50 years since KISN first went on the air. Stone (also known as Dave Rogaway) would continue to document KISN and Portland history through his Web site, "The Stumptown Blogger". On January 1, 2010, Stone announced plans to revive KISN. His efforts and those of good friend "Dirty Dave the Record Slave," station historian Craig Adams, and technician Scott Young would lead to KISN returning as an online audio stream. Officially titled the "KISN Good Guys" and located at http://goodguyradio.com/, the new KISN featured the voices of some of the original station's more popular personalities.

The stream began operation at 7:00 p.m. PST on February 24, 2012. The "oldies" format featured the record collection of "Dirty Dave," said to number over 100,000. As was noted throughout the broadcast day, the stream did not follow a limited playlist. Within weeks, the revived "KISN" had accumulated thousands of listeners not just in the Vancouver/Portland market, but had gained listeners from all over the world.

On August 14, 2014, the project was officially discontinued, though the stream continued operating for several days afterward.

=== Low-power FM revival ===
Following the discontinued operation of the KISN internet stream, Scott Young contacted Ken Seymour of the Western Oregon Radio Club (WORC) to explore opportunities for joining forces to resurrect KISN radio. The WORC recently received a Construction Permit issued by the FCC to build a new low-power, non-commercial radio station assigned to Portland on 95.1 FM. The WORC, led by President Ron Polluconi and club member RF engineer Ken Seymour, were planning to move the club's existing radio station, KQSO-LP, from Newberg, Oregon to Portland's Mount Scott. On August 26, 2014, the WORC installed the transmit antenna for 95.1 on a tower located in a communications compound on Mt. Scott.

On October 21, 2014, Ken Seymour successfully negotiated use of the KISN call sign from the licensee of the current KISN radio station located near Bozeman, Montana. Subsequently, a press release was issued on November 28, 2014, where Ron Polluconi announced that "finally after 38 years the KISN call sign and radio signal will return to Portland via the FM airwaves". On May 1, 2015, at 9:51 a.m. KISN-LP commenced broadcasting 24 hours a day 56 years later to the day when the original KISN launched in 1959. Current KISN-LP DJ's include Tom Brooks (G. Michael McKay), Craig Adams, and Steve Lloyd.
