= KQSO-LP =

Radio station in Newberg, Oregon (2009–2014)

- Newberg, Oregon; United States
- Frequencies: 96.3 MHz (issued STA to operate on 102.9)

Programming
- Format: Defunct (formerly Educational Adult standards Oldies Ham Radio News)

Ownership
- Owner: Western Oregon Radio Club, Inc.
- Sister stations: KQRZ-LP

History
- First air date: February 7, 2009
- Last air date: December 25, 2014
- Call sign meaning: Amateur Radio Q Code: "A contact...exchange of information...a QSO"

Technical information
- Licensing authority: FCC
- Facility ID: 135128
- Class: L1
- ERP: 1 watt
- HAAT: 343.3 meters (1,126 ft)
- Transmitter coordinates: 45°17′58″N 122°58′27″W

Links
- Public license information: LMS

KQSO-LP, formerly licensed to operate on (96.3 FM), was a low-power radio station licensed to Newberg, Oregon, United States. However, the Federal Communications Commission (FCC) had issued a STA for the station to operate at 102.9 MHz due to the move-in of a commercial station (KWLZ-FM) licensed to West Linn, Oregon. The station signed on the air February 7, 2009, and was owned by the Western Oregon Radio Club, Inc. (WORC), an amateur radio organization.

On January 1, 2012, KQSO-LP undertook an affiliation with the WORC Oldies Network, which syndicates broadcast material to other low-power radio stations interested in amateur radio. Programming included amateur (ham) radio news, educational material, comedy, oldies, and adult standard music.

Veteran disc jockey (DJ) "The Vegetable Man", who was local to Pacific Northwest radio in the 1960s, was also broadcast by the network with periodic shows daily.

On December 25, 2014, the station signed permanently off the air due to an FM translator in Portland signing on the air on the same frequency as KQSO-LP. Due to the translator's overpowering signal, KQSO-LP's signal was impeded. A decision was made to cease operation. Early in 2014, the WORC applied to the FCC for another LPFM station in Portland. As such, the FCC granted the WORC a CP for KISN-LP. On May 1, 2015, KISN-LP went on the air and was subsequently licensed by the FCC. See KISN (Portland) for more details.

The WORC surrendered the license for KQSO-LP to the FCC on May 1, 2015; the license was cancelled on May 4, 2015.
