= Willie – Before His Time =

Willie - Before His Time

Studio album by Willie Nelson
- Released: 1977
- Recorded: 1965–1971
- Genre: Country
- Label: RCA
- Producer: Richie Albright

Willie Nelson chronology
The Longhorn Jamboree Presents: Willie Nelson & His Friends (1976)	Willie - Before His Time (1977)	Face of a Fighter (1978)

Willie – Before His Time is a 1977 album by country singer Willie Nelson. The album features songs previously recorded by Nelson during the 1960s and early 1970s, re-released in order to take advantage of the popularity he gained during the mid-1970s.

All of the songs were previously issued except "You Ought to Hear Me Cry", recorded in 1967 and intended for release on a budget album, Good Ol' Country Singin', which was prepared for release in 1968 but later cancelled. Good Ol' Country Singin' was eventually released, with the intended track lineup, in September 2000.

== Track listing ==
1. "One in a Row"
2. "I'd Trade All of My Tomorrows (For Just One Yesterday)"
3. "She's Not for You"
4. "You Ought to Hear Me Cry"
5. "To Make a Long Story Short (She's Gone)"
6. "I'm a Memory"
7. "Stay Away from Lonely Places"
8. "It Should Be Easier Now"
9. "Little Things"
10. "How Long Have You Been There"
