= Man With the Blues =

Single by Willie Nelson
- B-side: "The Storm Has Just Begun"
- Released: July 9, 1959
- Recorded: 1959 at Manco Studio (Fort Worth, Texas)
- Genre: Country
- Length: 2:07
- Label: D
- Songwriter(s): Willie Nelson

Willie Nelson singles chronology
"No Place for Me" (1957)	"Man With the Blues" (1959)	"What a Way to Live" (1960)

"Man With the Blues" is a song by country music singer-songwriter Willie Nelson. After moving to Fort Worth, Texas, and quitting the music business for a year, Nelson returned to perform on the KCUL's Country Hoedown. Through a booking agent, he was signed as a recording artist by D Records.

To pay for his first recording session, Nelson gave his booking agent half of the publishing rights of the song. Backed with "The Storm Has Just Begun", the single failed to succeed. Subsequently, Nelson rerecorded it in 1976 and 2010.

== Background ==
In 1957, after failing to land a spot on the Ozark Jubilee, Willie Nelson moved to Fort Worth, Texas, and quit the music business for a year. He sold bibles and vacuum cleaners door-to-door, and eventually became a sales manager for the Encyclopedia Americana.

Returning to the music business, Nelson started to perform on the local show "Cowtown Hoedown" on KCUL. Uncle Hank Craig, the manager that booked the acts to the show helped Nelson to be signed as a recording artist to Pappy Daily's D Records and to his publishing firm, Glad Music.

== Recordings ==
In 1959, Nelson assisted to his first session as a recording artist at Manco Studios in Fort Worth, Texas. His backing was composed of steel guitarist Bobby Penton, drummer Lonnie Campbell, bassist Johnny Smith and the Hoedown artists "The Reil Sisters" as his backing group. To pay for the session, Nelson gave Craig half of the publishing rights for "Man With the Blues". For its release as a single, the song was coupled with Nelson's original "The Storm Has Just Begun" on the flipside. Upon its release, the single failed to meet success.

Nelson recorded again the song in 1976 for his album The Longhorn Jamboree Presents: Willie Nelson & His Friends, in 2010 for his release Country Music., and in 2023 for his album Bluegrass.
