= Claude Gray =

American country music singer (1932–2023)

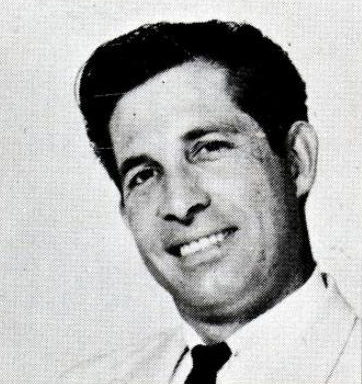
- Gray in 1967

Background information
- Born: Claude Gray Jr. January 25, 1932; Henderson, Texas, U.S.
- Died: April 28, 2023 (aged 91) Skokie, Illinois, U.S.
- Genres: Country
- Occupation: Singer
- Instruments: Vocals, guitar
- Years active: 1959–2023
- Label: Mercury
- Website: Claude Gray Official Website

Claude Gray Jr. (January 25, 1932 – April 28, 2023), nicknamed "The Tall Texan", was an American country music singer and guitar picker best known for his 1960 hit "Family Bible", which has been covered by many different artists. Gray's other hits include a 1961 covers of Bill Brock's "I'll Just Have a Cup of Coffee (Then I'll Go)" and Roger Miller's "My Ears Should Burn (When Fools Are Talked About)" as well as 1966's "I Never Had the One I Wanted".

Alongside artists such as Ray Price, Jim Reeves, Eddy Arnold, Don Gibson and Chet Atkins, Gray was a purveyor of the Nashville sound, embracing the Countrypolitan movement which paved the way for pop-oriented singers in country music and attracted new audiences to the genre.

== Early life ==
Gray was born in Henderson, Texas, on January 25, 1932, where he started his singing career while attending high school. After school, he served in the United States Navy from 1950 to 1954. Upon his return to home, he worked as a salesman for the rest of the decade. He began a recording career in 1959, after working as a radio announcer in Kilgore, Texas, and performing as a disc jockey in Meridian, Mississippi.

== Career ==
Gray was approached by D Records in 1959, and recorded "I'm Not Supposed", which was released as his first single. The song made the Cashbox country charts. The following year, Gray and two friends purchased the song "Family Bible" from Willie Nelson for $100. Gray then recorded the song, and released it as a single. It peaked at No. 10 on the country chart. In 1961, "I'll Just Have a Cup of Coffee (Then I'll Go)", was released, which peaked at No. 4, and was followed by the biggest hit of Gray's career, the No. 3 "My Ears Should Burn (When Fools Are Talked About)", which was penned by Roger Miller. Gray's final top ten hit came in 1967 with "I Never Had the One I Wanted", which was also his final charted song upon re-release in 1979.

In the late 1970s, Gray co-wrote with Walt Breeland, a controversial song titled "The Ballad of Jimmy Hoffa". Gray's record label at the time (Mercury Records) refused to allow him to record the song, but he eventually recorded it for Ol' Podner Records, who subsequently released it directly to the Teamsters. In 1986, he released a cover of Neil Diamond's "Sweet Caroline".

Gray continued to tour with The Claude Gray Roadshow, performing shows throughout North America and in parts of Europe, where classic country music remains popular.

== Personal life and death ==
Gray was 6 feet 5 inches (1.96 m) and because of his height, was given the moniker, "The Tall Texan."

On April 18, 2023, a social media post shared by a Gray family friend, stated that Gray had entered hospice care after the discovery of a large tumor on his brain, leaving him non-cognitive. He died in Skokie, Illinois, on April 28, 2023, at the age of 91.

== Discography ==
=== Albums ===
Year	Album	US Country	Label
1961	Songs of Broken Love Affairs		Mercury
1962	Country Goes to Town		Mercury
1967	Claude Gray Sings	45	Decca
1968	Easy Way		Decca
1968	Treasure of Love		Hilltop
1972	Presenting		Million

=== Singles ===
Year	Single	Chart Positions			Album
Year	Single	US Country	US	CAN Country	Album
1958	"My Tears Are Inside"				singles only
1958	"Late Again"				singles only
1959	"I'm Not Supposed"				singles only
1959	"Best Part of Me"				singles only
1960	"Family Bible"	10			singles only
1960	"My Party's Over"				singles only
1960	"Homecoming in Heaven"				singles only
1961	"I'll Just Have a Cup of Coffee (Then I'll Go)"	4	84		Songs of Broken Love Affairs
1961	"My Ears Should Burn (When Fools Are Talked About)"	3			Songs of Broken Love Affairs
1962	"Let's End It Before It Begins"	26			singles only
1962	"You Take the Table (And I'll Take the Chairs)"				singles only
1962	"Daddy Stopped In"	20			singles only
1963	"Knock Again, True Love"	18			singles only
1963	"First Love Never Dies"				singles only
1963	"I'm Gonna Lie Again"				singles only
1964	"Eight Years (And Two Children Later)"	43			singles only
1964	"Too Many Rivers"				singles only
1965	"Kinderhook Bill"				singles only
1965	"Thank You for the Ride"				singles only
1966	"Mean Old Woman"	22			singles only
1966	"I Never Had the One I Wanted"	9			Claude Gray Sings
1967	"Because of Him"	45			Easy Way
1967	"If I Ever Need a Lady (I'll Call You)"	67			Easy Way
1967	"How Fast Them Trucks Can Go"	12			Claude Gray Sings
1968	"Your Devil Memory"				Easy Way
1968	"Night Life"	31		25	Easy Way
1968	"The Love of a Woman"	68			single only
1969	"Don't Give Me a Chance"	41			Easy Way
1969	"Take Off Time"	34			singles only
1970	"The Cleanest Man in Cincinnati"	54			singles only
1970	"Everything Will Be Alright"	40		27	singles only
1971	"Angel"	41			singles only
1971	"Baton Rouge"				singles only
1972	"Jeannie"				Presenting
1972	"What Every Woman Wants to Hear"	66			Presenting
1973	"Woman Ease My Mind"	58			Presenting
1973	"Loving You Is a Habit I Can't Break"				Presenting
1976	"Rockin' My Memories (To Sleep)"	88			singles only
1977	"We Fell in Love That Way"	92			singles only
1977	"It'll Do"				singles only
1978	"Slow Dancing"				singles only
1978	"If I Ever Need a Lady" (re-recording)	68			If I Ever Need a Lady
1979	"I Never Had the One I Wanted" (re-recording)	78			If I Ever Need a Lady
1979	"How Fast Them Trucks Can Go"				singles only
1979	"It Ain't the Wakin' Up"				singles only
1981	"Every Night Sensation"				singles only
1981	"He's Just an Illusion"				singles only
1982	"Let's Go All the Way" (w/ Norma Jean)	68			singles only
1982	"Who Sent My Ex to Texas"				singles only
1986	"Sweet Caroline"	77			singles only
