= Sheldon F. Sackett =

American businessman and journalist

- Born: August 2, 1902; Sheridan, Oregon, US
- Died: September 5, 1968 (aged 66); San Francisco, California, US
- Resting place: Masonic Cemetery Albany, Oregon
- Occupation: Newspaper publisher
- Spouses: Beatrice Walton (m. 1931–1947) Evelyn Zingelman Schwabe (m. 1948–1949) Elizabeth Worthington (m. 1950–1959)
- Children: 3

Sheldon F. Sackett (August 2, 1902 – September 5, 1968) was an American businessman, journalist and newspaper publisher. Sackett owned several media properties in Oregon and California, including The World in Coos Bay, KVAN in Portland, and KROW in Oakland. He was responsible for renaming The Coos Bay Times to The World in the 1960s.

== Personal life ==
Sackett married Beatrice Walton in Salem in December 1931; they had two children, Marcia and John. Sackett and Walton moved to Coos Bay in 1936 to run The Coos Bay Times. Walton died of cancer in May 1947.

Sackett married Evelyn Schwabe (née Zingelman) on August 2, 1948, at the Swedenborgian Church in San Francisco. The marriage lasted less than a year.

Sackett married Elizabeth Worthington on January 30, 1950, in Piedmont, California. Worthington later sued for divorce, citing Sackett's "extreme cruelty." In the divorce, Worthington sought custody of an 8-year-old son and a portion of Sackett's estimated $3.6 million in properties. She also requested an order to prevent Sackett from selling any more of his properties.

Sacket died September 5, 1968, in San Francisco and is buried at the Albany Masonic Cemetery in Albany, Oregon.

== Business ==
In 1928, Sackett and Earl F. Brownlee bought the Salem Statesman Journal. Sackett was managing editor of the paper. Later, he was publisher of The World and continued buying and selling media properties. In December 1944, Sackett was publisher of the Oakland, California-based Olympic Press. That same year, he purchased KROW for $250,000.

In 1947, Sackett bought The Sun in Vancouver, Washington, The Seattle Star, a weekly Portland newspaper, and a million dollar printing plant in Portland. Sackett ran out of money a few months later and subsequently sold the Portland and Seattle papers.

Sackett tried to buy the Los Angeles Daily News for $1,525,000 in 1954 but allegedly could not come up with the money.

In 1959, Sackett reportedly sold KVAN and KROW to Star Broadcasting, Inc. and Don W. Burden of Omaha, Nebraska for $1.9 million.
