= Make Way for Willie Nelson =

Studio album by Willie Nelson
- Released: May 1967
- Recorded: March–June 1966
- Studio: RCA Studio B, Nashville, Tennessee
- Genre: Country
- Length: 33:01
- Label: RCA Victor
- Producer: Felton Jarvis, Chet Atkins

Willie Nelson chronology
Country Favorites-Willie Nelson Style (1966)	Make Way for Willie Nelson (1967)	The Party's Over and Other Great Willie Nelson Songs (1967)

Make Way for Willie Nelson is the fifth studio album by American country music singer Willie Nelson.

The single "One in a Row", Nelson's only original included on the album, peaked at number 19 on Billboard's Hot Country Singles. The album peaked at number nine on Billboard's Hot Country Albums.

== Background ==
By 1966, Nelson was becoming increasingly frustrated with the sound of his records at RCA, which did not boast the vitality of his live shows. Producer Chet Atkins often couched Nelson’s stylized vocal delivery in lush strings and background singers that were the hallmarks of the Nashville sound in the sixties. “You’d walk into the studio,” the singer remembered, “and they’d put six guys behind you who’d never seen your music before, and it’s impossible to get the feel of it in a three-hour session. This was true for me, at least.” During the first months of 1966, Atkins delegated sessions to other producers due to his demanding schedule, and in March Nelson's next session was assigned to RCA Records staff producer Felton Jarvis, who had just started producing Elvis Presley.

== Recording and composition ==
The recording took place in Nashville's RCA Studio B between March and June 1966. The musicians who joined the session were Jerry Reed on the guitar, bassist Junior Husky, guitarist Velma Smith and Jerry Smith on piano. Additionally, Nelson added two members of his road band, Johnny Bush on the guitar and Jimmy Day on the steel guitar. The recordings were nearly all covers and reached for a countrypolitan sound. The last song of the album, Nelson's original "One in a Row", was recorded in June along with guitarist Johnny Bush and fiddler Wade Ray. This sole Nelson composition on the LP is "a dramatic heartbreak ballad that danced easily with the pop standards "Have I Stayed Away Too Long" and "What Now My Love", which also appeared on the album." In his book Willie Nelson, biographer Joe Nick Patoski notes, “Felton had a lighter touch, and Willie was nowhere near as intimidated by Felton as he was by Chet. When it came to picking guitar, no one was as good as Chet, so Willie often deferred to Chet’s judgement at his own expense.” The album showcases Nelson’s versatility, as Streissguth observes:

...it left no questions about his versatility: he could breezily deliver swinging pop songs and punch out the country stuff. In future years, Willie would complain that Nashville producers buried his voice in a mix of strings and brass instruments during the 1960s, but on Make Way for Willie Nelson nothing could have been further from the truth: Willie’s voice pulsed above the mix, very urbane...Folks in the industry insisted that he deserved the success of Porter Wagoner and Roger Miller but admitted that his lyrics were too complex for the market.

== Release and reception ==
Professional ratings
Review scores
Source	Rating
AllMusic	2.5/5 stars

The single "One in a Row" was released with the non-album flipside "San Antonio Rose", on October 1, 1966. "One in a Row" reached number 19 on Billboard's Hot Country Singles. The single "Make Way For a Better Man" was released as the flipside on the non-album track "The Party's Over" in February 1967. Upon its release, the album entered the chart on May 6, at number 45 on Billboard's Hot Country Albums. By July, the release peaked at number nine.

Broadside noted that the recording consisted mainly on cover versions, including only one Nelson original. The publication attributed the release to be "thought towards establishing Willie's (Nelson) reputation as a performer, independently of his talent as a songwriter".

== Track listing ==
Side one

Track	Song title	Writer(s)	Time
1.	"Make Way for a Better Man"	Cy Coben	2:01
2.	"Some Other World"	Floyd Tillman	2:11
3.	"Have I Stayed Away Too Long?"	Frank Loesser	3:06
4.	"Born to Lose"	Ted Daffan	2:39
5.	"Lovin' Lies"	Dorothy Chapman, Troy Martin, Pete Pyle	3:02
6.	"You Made Me Live, Love and Die"	Floyd Tillman	2:53

Side two

Track	Song title	Writer(s)	Time
1.	"What Now My Love"	Gilbert Bécaud, Pierre Delanoë, Carl Sigman	3:13
2.	"Teach Me to Forget"	Leon Payne	2:53
3.	"Mansion on the Hill"	Fred Rose, Hank Williams	3:02
4.	"If It's Wrong to Love You"	Bonnie Dodd, Charles Mitchell	2:21
5.	"Have I Told You Lately That I Love You"	Scotty Wiseman	3:06
6.	"One in a Row"	Willie Nelson	2:34

== Personnel ==
- Willie Nelson – guitar, vocals
- Jerry Reed – guitar
- Junior Huskey – bass
- Velma Smith – guitar
- Jerry Smith – piano
- Johnny Bush – guitar
- Jimmy Day – steel guitar
- Wade Ray – fiddle
- Bill Walker – arrangements on "Make Way for a Better Man" and "One in a Row"

Technical

- Jim Malloy – engineer

== Charts ==
Chart (1967)	Peak position
US Top Country Albums (Billboard)	9
