= Country Favorites – Willie Nelson Style =

Studio album by Willie Nelson
- Released: 1966
- Studio: RCA Victor Studios, Nashville, Tennessee
- Genre: Country, Western Swing
- Label: RCA Victor
- Producer: Chet Atkins

Willie Nelson chronology
Country Willie: His Own Songs (1965)	Country Favorites – Willie Nelson Style (1966)	Make Way for Willie Nelson (1967)

Country Favorites – Willie Nelson Style is the fourth studio album by country singer Willie Nelson. He recorded it with Ernest Tubb's band, the Texas Troubadours and Western Swing fiddler-vocalist Wade Ray with studio musicians Jimmy Wilkerson and Hargus "Pig" Robbins. At the time of the recording, Nelson was a regular on a syndicated TV show hosted by Tubb.

== Background ==
From 1965 to 1971, Nelson would make some 150 appearances on Ernest Tubb's syndicated television show, serving as the face of modern country in contrast to Tubb's traditional honky-tonk appeal. A lifelong fan of Tubb, Nelson later stated, "I could compare Ernest Tubb to Frank Sinatra, in that they both had distinctive styles that you wouldn't confuse with anybody else." Nelson, who had already recorded one album with Chet Atkins for RCA after moving there from Liberty, later recalled, “The Ernest Tubb Show was something else entirely, different from the sparkled-and spangled look of the Opry...My usual outfit was a plain turtleneck and black slacks. Nothing fancy. But it was more casual clothes that made me comfortable.” It was due to his association with the show that Tubb's band the Texas Troubadours wound up backing him on his second RCA LP.

== Recording and composition ==
Unlike his previous three albums, Country Favorites: Willie Nelson Style contains no original songs but rather cover tunes by fellow songwriters and singers such as Hank Cochran, Harlan Howard, Leon Payne, and George Jones. Like his second Liberty album, the recording made in mid-December 1965 had a strong western swing flavour, and the pairing with the Troubadours made musical and commercial sense, since they knew Nelson's work from the television show and tours and were regarded as an ensemble with enough appeal to make their own records for Decca without Ernest.

Country Favorites was arguably Nelson's finest artistic achievement up to that point, with Lang Thompson of AllMusic observing, "Nelson had already learned how to handle his unconventional voice effectively, giving these songs the honest freshness and sharp sense of rhythm that would characterize his later work." Nelson first started playing "Columbus Stockade Blues" as a "jazzy up-tempo number too fast for the dancers" while touring with wife Shirley Collie and steel guitarist Jimmy Day as The Offenders. Nelson biographer Joe Nick Patoski notes that the reprisal of the song on this album "would have been better left off compared with the fiery earlier versions he'd recorded with Shirley Collie for Liberty Records..." Although Nelson respected Atkins, he later admitted to being unhappy with the producer's formulaic approach:

I was patient. I went along with the same process on my second RCA record, Country Favorites: Willie Nelson Style. This time it was all covers, no originals, including "San Antonio Rose," the calling card of my idol, Bob Wills. I still found the production heavy-handed and wondered why Chet was so adamant about putting the word "country" in the title. "If we're going for that mainstream audience, doesn't 'country' restrict me?" I couldn't help but ask. "One step at a time," Chet answered..." "Whatever you say," I said, but I remained unconvinced.

In 1970, RCA issued an abridged version of this album as "Columbus Stockade Blues" on the budget RCA Camden label (CAS-2444).

== Reception ==
Professional ratings
Review scores
Source	Rating
AllMusic	4/5 stars
AllMusic	2/5 stars

Country Favorites was released in early 1966 and stayed on the country charts for seventeen weeks, peaking at number 9. AllMusic: "Perhaps because the album is a collection of familiar songs, Nelson's idiosyncratic vocals went over better - or maybe his time had just come - but in any case, it's certainly a small treasure."

== Track listing ==
1. "Columbus Stockade Blues" (Thomas Darby) – 1:56
2. "Seasons of My Heart" (George Jones, Darrell Edwards) – 2:44
3. "I'd Trade All of My Tomorrows (For Just One Yesterday)" (Jenny Lou Carson) – 2:24
4. "My Window Faces the South" (Mitchell Parish, Abner Silver) – 1:42
5. "Go on Home" (Hank Cochran) – 2:14
6. "Fraulein" (Lawton Williams) – 2:56
7. "San Antonio Rose" (Bob Wills) – 2:07
8. "I Love You Because" (Leon Payne) – 2:58
9. "Don't You Ever Get Tired (Of Hurting Me)" (Hank Cochran) – 3:00
10. "Home in San Antone" (Fred Rose) – 1:40
11. "Heartaches by the Number" (Harlan Howard) – 2:19
12. "Making Believe" (Jimmy Work) – 2:53

== Personnel ==
- Willie Nelson – guitar, vocals
- Buddy Charleton – pedal steel
- Jack Drake – bass
- Jack Greene – drums
- Wade Ray – fiddle
- Leon Rhodes – lead guitar
- Hargus Robbins – piano
- Cal Smith – rhythm guitar
- Jimmy Wilkerson – bass, vibraphone
- Jim Malloy – engineer

== Bibliography ==
- Nelson, Willie; Shrake, Bud (1988). Willie: An Autobiography. Simon and Schuster. ISBN 978-0671680756.
- Nelson, Willie; Ritz, David (2015). It's A Long Story: My Life. Little, Brown and Company. ISBN 9780316339315.
- Patoski, Joe Nick (2008). Willie Nelson: An Epic Life. Hachette Digital. ISBN 978-0-316-01778-7.
