= The Western Express =

American country music radio show

- Genre: Country music
- Running time: 180 minutes (1947–1956); 60 minutes (1956); 240 minutes (1956–1957)
- Home station: KCNC, KVAN
- Hosted by: Charlie Williams (1947–1956); Willie Nelson (1956–1957)
- Original release: 1947 – 1957

The Western Express was a country-music radio show transmitted by KCNC in Fort Worth, Texas. The show started in 1947, hosted by disk jockey Charlie Williams. In 1956, the station later hired Willie Nelson, then a struggling singer-songwriter who previously worked on different radio stations. Nelson hosted the three-hour-long show singing his original songs, taking calls and playing records.

After moving to Portland, Oregon, Nelson hosted the show for KVAN, in Vancouver, Washington. Initially on a morning one-hour slot, Nelson limited the format to only play records. Through public appearances, he became a popular DJ, eventually moving to a four-hour-long slot. The show was cancelled in 1957, after KVAN switched the programming format from country music to rock and roll.

== Beginnings ==
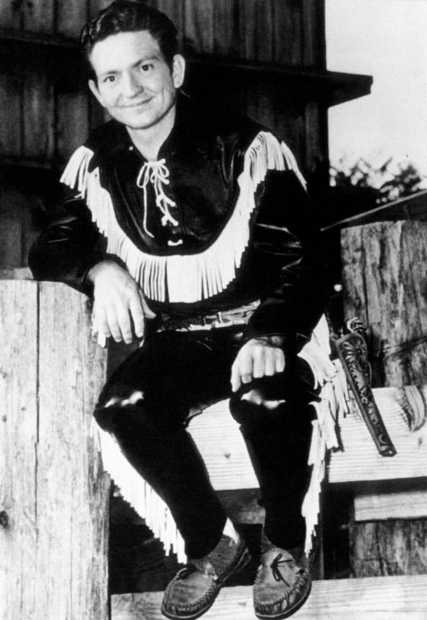
Publicity portrait of Nelson for KVAN Vancouver, 1957

The Western Express started in 1947, being aired by KCNC in Fort Worth, Texas and hosted by disk jockey Charlie Williams. Upon Williams' sudden move to California in 1956, the station hired Willie Nelson, who previously worked short stints in local stations. Besides of sign-on shift, Nelson took The Western Express, the three-hour afternoon show that ran from 12:00 to 15:00.

During the first half-hour, he performed his original songs with the accompaniment of his guitar, while he played records for the remaining of the show. Nelson was also joined on the show by his guitarist, Oliver English; drummer Tony Roznozky; and Nelson's later to-be drummer and Oliver's brother, Paul English. The program also featured Nelson taking calls from his listeners on the area.

== Texas Willie Nelson ==
Later the same year, Nelson moved to Portland, Oregon. He was hired by KVAN in Vancouver, Washington, where he hosted the show from 13:30 to 14:30. Nelson removed his singing from the format, and limited himself to only play records. While he was off-the-air, Nelson sold airtime for publicity on his show. Dubbed, "Wee Willie Nelson" and "Texas Willie Nelson", he started to make public appearances. Due to his high popularity, Nelson's time slot was changed to 10:00 – 14:00, becoming the most listened radio personality on the Portland-Vancouver area.

In February 1957, Nelson used the studios of the radio make his first recordings. He cut his original "No Place for Me", along with Leon Payne's "Lumberjack". Upon sending the recordings to Starday Records in Houston, Texas, he sold the records pressed under the "Willie Nelson label" on The Western Express. Nelson also made extra profits by promoting other acts on the air, while he earned US$40 a week.

Nelson met and interviewed on his show publicist and songwriter Mae Boren Axton. After expressing his admiration for Boren, Nelson played for her on his reel-tape recorder the work in progress of his original "Family Bible" to know her opinion. Impressed, Axton encouraged Nelson to continue to pursue his songwriting career by going to Nashville. By this time, and due to his high popularity, Nelson demanded a raise that was denied by the station. He quit the show soon after. The Western Express was cancelled and KVAN later changed its programming format from country music to the newborn rockabilly. Nelson left the radio business, focusing on his recordings and live performances.
