= No Place for Me =

1957 single by Willie Nelson

Single by Willie Nelson
- B-side: "Lumberjack"
- Released: February 1957
- Genre: Country
- Length: 1:18
- Label: Willie Nelson Records
- Songwriter(s): Willie Nelson

Willie Nelson singles chronology
"No Place for Me" (1957)	"Man With the Blues" (1959)

Audio sample
- Willie Nelson - "No Place For Me": file; help

"No Place for Me" is the debut single of country singer-songwriter Willie Nelson. Nelson recorded the song while working as a disc jockey at KVAN in Vancouver, Washington, using a studio of the radio. Through a DJ he met during his time working on the radio in Texas, he contacted Starday Records, sending the tapes over to the label.

Starday Records pressed for Nelson 500 copies of the single, issued under the custom label "Willie Nelson Records". The company initially reserved the rights for re-publications under the Starday label, but decided later not to exercise the right. Nelson sold the record over his radio show The Western Express, a final total of 3,000 units.

== Background ==
After working in different radio stations as a disk jockey in Texas, Willie Nelson moved to Portland, Oregon in 1956. Nelson was soon hired by KVAN, where he hosted the hour-long show The Western Express. He soon gained popularity in the area, making public appearances singing in Vancouver clubs, and at other local events. Nelson's show was soon upgraded, hosting by 1957 a three-hour long show, and becoming one of the most listened radio personalities in the Portland-Vancouver area.

== Recording and release ==
Taking advantage of his local popularity, Nelson decided that it was time to record his debut single. He chose, for the main side his original "No Place for Me", bringing local steel guitarist Buddy Fite to back him. Nelson played his own guitar on the recording in a boom-chicka-boom style> The song went for 78 seconds. He included on the flipside, for commercial purposes, Leon Payne's "Lumberjack", which was set in the state of Oregon. Nelson recorded both songs with the existing equipment in a studio of the radio station.

During his time working on the radio in Texas, Nelson met disc jockey T. Texas Tyler. He called Tyler to ask for his help to press the records. Tyler called his acquaintance Don Pierce, who worked in Pappy Daily's Starday Records. Nelson mailed the tapes to Starday, who pressed 500 recordings under the custom "Willie Nelson Label". Nelson paid for the records, agreeing to Starday's policy of reserving the rights of the tracks for further releases on the Starday label or for the label to act as a publisher of the song.

Ultimately, Starday decided not to exercise the right, since neither Pierce nor Daily felt that the songs had the potential for a label release. Nelson sold the records on-air during his show in February 1957, offering them for US$1, with the addition of an 8x10 autographed photograph. The single sold 3,000 copies.
