= When the Party's Over (disambiguation) =

When the Party's Over is a 1993 film starring Sandra Bullock.

When the Party's Over may also refer to:

- "When the Party's Over" (song) by Billie Eilish, from the album When We All Fall Asleep, Where Do We Go? (2019)
- "When the Party's Over", a song by Janis Ian from the album Between the Lines (1975)
- "When the Party's Over", a song by Alexander O'Neal from the album Hearsay (1987)
- "When the Party's Over", a song by The Chevin from the album Borderland (2012)
- "When the Party's Over", a song by Mabel from the album About Last Night... (2022)
