= KWMF =

- Pleasanton, Texas; United States
- Frequency: 1380 kHz
- Branding: Virgen de Guadalupe Radio

Programming
- Language: Spanish
- Format: Spanish Catholic

Ownership
- Owner: Gloria Ziga and Ramon Coronado; (Virgen de Guadalupe Global Communications, LLC)

History
- Former call signs: KFNI (1999–2007); KAJG (2007–2007)

Technical information
- Licensing authority: FCC
- Facility ID: 55415
- Class: B
- Power: 4,000 watts (day); 160 watts (night)
- Transmitter coordinates: 29°0′0.00″N 98°31′50.00″W

Links
- Public license information: Public file; LMS
- Webcast: Listen live
- Website: Official website

KWMF (1380 AM) is a radio station broadcasting a Spanish religious format and licensed in Pleasanton, Texas, United States. The station is currently owned by Gloria Ziga and Ramon Coronado, through licensee Virgen de Guadalupe Global Communications, LLC.

== History ==
The station was assigned call sign KFNI on 1999-05-06. On 2007-03-30, the station changed its call sign to KAJG and then on 2007-04-09 to the current KWMF.
