= XHBC-FM =

Radio station in Ciudad Guzmán, Jalisco, Mexico

- Ciudad Guzmán, Jalisco; Mexico
- Frequency: 95.1 MHz
- Branding: Amor Es 95.1

Programming
- Format: Romantic

Ownership
- Owner: Grupo Radiofónico Zer; (Radio Armonía, S.A. de C.V.)

History
- First air date: December 2, 1948 (concession)
- Former call signs: XEBC-AM (1948–2019)
- Former frequencies: 990 kHz (1948–2019)

Technical information
- Licensing authority: CRT
- Class: B1
- ERP: 10,000 watts
- HAAT: 270.1 m (886 ft)

Links
- Webcast: BC 95.1 Webcast

XHBC-FM is a radio station in Ciudad Guzmán, Jalisco, Mexico, broadcasting on 95.1 MHz FM.

== History ==
=== XEBC callsign ===
XEBC was the former call sign of a border-blaster radio station licensed to the Tijuana / Rosarito area of Baja California, Mexico. The original XEBC, which launched in the early 1930s, was the first "border blaster" station in the Tijuana area.

=== In Ciudad Guzmán ===
The XEBC callsign returned to the air in December 1948, when Radio Ciudad Guzmán, S.A., was awarded the concession for XEBC-AM 990, serving Ciudad Guzmán with 1,000 watts day and 100 watts night. Radio Armonía became the concessionaire in 1972 and was awarded the FM combo station in 1994.

In 2016, XEBC-XHBC, along with XHIS-FM 106.3, was bought by Grupo Radiofónico ZER; ownership of the concessionaire Radio Armonía, which had been held by Guadalajara-based Unidifusión, was transferred entirely to Rodrigo Rodríguez Reyes and Josefina Reyes Sahagún. The result was a new name and brand for the station.

On March 11, 2019, Grupo Radiofónico ZER surrendered the AM frequency to the IFT, citing high costs of operation.
