= Neon Boots Dancehall & Saloon =

Bar in Houston, Texas, U.S.

Coordinates: 29.814445°N 95.475974°W

Neon Boots Dancehall & Saloon is a Country and Western bar/honky tonk that was founded as the Esquire Ballroom in 1955 by Raymond Proske in Houston, Texas, at 11410 Hempstead northwest of downtown Houston. In the 1970s and 1980s the club was considered the main rival to Gilley's Club across town in Pasadena.

The Esquire Ballroom closed in 1995 and remained unused for a number of years. The nightclub reopened as Neon Boots Dancehall & Saloon in August 2013 as the largest country and western genre bar in the Southern United States, the second largest country and western dancehall and bar in the state of Texas, and largest country and western bar in Houston. It continues to host music acts, comedy shows, charity events and more on the same stage that it used as the previous Esquire Ballroom.

On March 28, 2014, USA Today named Neon Boots one of the top ten dance halls in Texas in their "10 Great Places" series.

== Notable appearances and performances ==
Bill Anderson • Bill Monroe • Billy Walker • Bob Wills and the Texas Playboys • Bobby Bare • Bobby Helms • Bobby Lewis • Buck Owens • Carl Smith • Charley Pride • Conway Twitty • Crystal Gayle • Darrell McCall • Dolly Parton • Earl Scruggs • Ernest Tubb • Faron Young • Ferlin Husky • Floyd Tillman • Freddie Hardt • Gene Watson • George Jones • Glen Campbell • Hank Locklin • Hank Thompson • Jack Greene • Jean Shepard • Jeannie C. Riley • Jeannie Sealy • Jim Reeves • Jimmy Copeland • Jimmy Dean • Jimmy Dickens • Jimmy Dry • Jimmy Heap • Joe Berry • Joey Jay •Johnny Bush • Johnnie Lee Wills • Johnny Rodriguez • Justin Fulcher Band • Kelly Scoppa • Kenny Rogers • Kitty Wells • Larry Butler • Lee Roy Matocha Orchestra • Lefty Frizzell • Leroy Van Dyke • Lester Flatt • Lonzo & Oscar • Loretta Lynn • Marty Robbins • Mel Tillis • Merle Haggard • Patsy Cline • Porter Wagoner • Ray Krenek Orchestra • Ray Price • Red Steagall • Rita Hardt & The Rhinesones • Ronnie Milsap • Rose Maddox • Roy Clark • Tammy Wynette • Tanya Tucker • Tom T. Hall • Wanda Jackson • Waylon Jennings • Web Price • Willie Nelson

=== Willie Nelson ===
After his son Billy was born in 1958, Willie Nelson and his family moved to Houston. On the way, Nelson stopped by the Esquire Ballroom to sell his original songs to house band singer Larry Butler. Butler refused to purchase the song "Mr. Record Man" for $10, instead giving Nelson a six-night job singing in the club and a $50 loan to rent an apartment. Nelson rented an apartment near Houston, in Pasadena, Texas, where he also worked at the radio station as the sign-on disk jockey.

Nelson was inspired to write the song "Night Life" during one of his trips from his home in Pasadena to his work, singing at the Esquire. Due to financial issues, Nelson sold the song to guitar instructor Paul Buskirk for $150. The song was rejected by Pappy Daily, who made Nelson's studio recordings at the time. Daily believed that the song was not country. Due to the amount of money that Nelson received for the song, he decided to record the song in another studio. To avoid legal actions, it was recorded as "Nite Life" under the artist name of "Hugh Nelson and Paul Buskirk and the Little Men".

== In theatre ==
The 1988 Broadway musical Always... Patsy Cline takes place in the bar. Produced by Ted Swindley in 1988, the story was taken and expanded from a section of the Cline biography, Honky Tonk Angel, written by Ellis Nassour. Always... Patsy Cline chronicles the real-life story of her encounter in 1961 with Louise Seger, a fan and Mississippi native who arrived early at The Esquire Ballroom in Houston for Cline's performance. In a chance encounter before the show, the two met and formed a lasting friendship.

== See also ==
- List of LGBTQ bars
