= KISN-LP =

Low-power FM radio station in Portland, Oregon

- Portland, Oregon; United States
- Broadcast area: Portland, Oregon
- Frequency: 95.1 MHz
- Branding: 95.1'derful KISN

Programming
- Language: English
- Format: Oldies

Ownership
- Owner: Western Oregon Radio Club, Inc.
- Sister stations: KQRZ-LP

History
- First air date: May 1, 2015
- Call sign meaning: Tribute to the former KISN (910 AM)

Technical information
- Licensing authority: FCC
- Facility ID: 195134
- Class: L1
- ERP: 2 watts
- HAAT: 280 meters (920 ft)

Links
- Public license information: LMS
- Webcast: Listen live
- Website: goodguyradio.com

KISN-LP is a low-power FM radio station broadcasting at 95.1 FM in Portland, Oregon, United States. It is owned and operated by Western Oregon Radio Club, Inc., and broadcasts an oldies format.

The station takes its call letters and inspiration from the former KISN in Vancouver, Washington, a then-Top 40 outlet which broadcast from 1959 to the late 1970s.

== History ==
In 2010, Dave "Records" Stone began an internet stream that served as a revival of KISN, at which he had worked. This stream was shut down in 2014. After its closure, Scott Young—who had been a technician involved in its creation—contacted Ken Seymour of the Western Oregon Radio Club (WORC) to explore opportunities for joining forces to resurrect KISN radio. The WORC had recently received a construction permit issued by the FCC to build a new low-power FM station in Portland on 95.1 FM. The WORC, led by President Ron Polluconi and club member Ken Seymour, were planning to move the club's existing radio station, KQSO-LP, from Newberg to Portland's Mount Scott; KQSO was shuttered because of the launch of an FM translator in Portland. On August 26, 2014, the WORC installed the transmit antenna for the new station on a tower located in a communications compound on Mt. Scott.

On October 21, 2014, Ken Seymour successfully negotiated use of the KISN call sign from the licensee of the current KISN radio station, located near Bozeman, Montana. Subsequently, a press release was issued on November 28, 2014, where Ron Polluconi announced that "finally after 38 years the KISN call sign and radio signal will return to Portland via the FM airwaves". On May 1, 2015, at 9:51 a.m., KISN-LP commenced broadcasting on the 56th anniversary of the launch of the original KISN in 1959.
