= KVAN (AM) =

Radio station in Burbank, Washington

- Burbank, Washington; United States
- Broadcast area: Tri-Cities
- Frequency: 1560 kHz

Programming
- Format: Spanish Religious (Family Oriented)

Ownership
- Owner: Centro Familiar Cristiano

Technical information
- Licensing authority: FCC
- Facility ID: 132714
- Class: B
- Power: 10,000 watts day 700 watts night
- Transmitter coordinates: 46°10′10.5″N 119°01′36″W

Links
- Public license information: Public file; LMS

KVAN (1560 AM) is a radio station broadcasting a Spanish Religious format. Located near Burbank, Washington, United States, the station serves the Tri-Cities area. The station is owned by Centro Familiar Cristiano.

== History ==
Between 1967 and 1979, the call letters KVAN were assigned to a progressive rock station located in Vancouver, Washington, operating on 1480 kHz. At first a daytime-only station, it began nighttime transmissions in 1975. Disk jockeys during this period included Gloria Johnson, Michael Deal, Iris Harrison, Bob Ancheta "The Big B.A.", Robin Banks, Dave Lind, Jeff Clark, Les Friedman, Andy Brown; Willie Nelson, who hosted The Western Express, Bruce Funkhouser, Chuck Scott, Paul Mitchell, Alan Mason, Bill St. James, Rob Sample, Ron Maita, Larry Scott, Kevin West, Sleepy John, Valerie Ring and Lowell King. Bob moved on to KGON 92.3 for 18 years with stops at KKRH and KINK 101.9 where he hosted the Sunday Night Blues Room for 13 years before retiring in 2011. He currently is the founder and owner of <internetjock.com> A voice over company in Beaverton, Oregon.
