= Johnny Bush =

American musician (1935–2020)

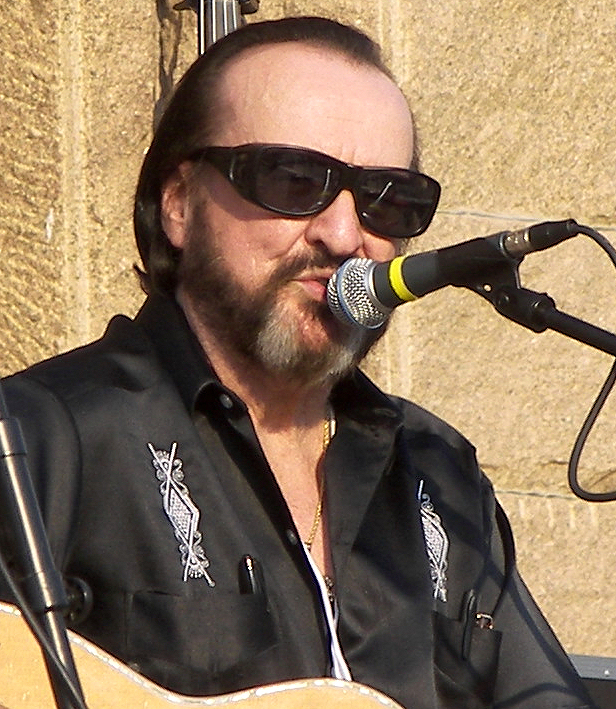
- Bush at the 2007 Texas Book Festival

Background information
- Also known as: The Country Caruso
- Born: John Bush Shinn III; February 17, 1935; Houston, Texas, U.S.
- Died: October 16, 2020 (aged 85) San Antonio, Texas, U.S.
- Genres: Country, honky-tonk, western swing
- Occupations: Musician, songwriter
- Instruments: Guitar, drums, fiddle
- Years active: 1952–2020
- Labels: Stop; Million; Starday; RCA; Delta; TCE; Watermelon; Texas Music Group; BGM; Heart of Texas; Icehouse Music
- Website: www.johnnybush.com

John Bush Shinn III (February 17, 1935 – October 16, 2020) was an American country music singer, songwriter, and musician. Nicknamed the "Country Caruso", Bush was best known for his distinctive voice and for writing the song "Whiskey River", a top-20 hit for himself that also became a signature song of fellow country artist Willie Nelson. He was especially popular in his native Texas.

== Early life ==
Bush was born John Bush Shinn III in the Kashmere Gardens neighborhood of Houston. He listened to the western swing music of Bob Wills and His Texas Playboys and the honky-tonk sounds of artists such as Ernest Tubb, Lefty Frizzell, and Hank Thompson. His uncle, the host of a local radio program on KTHT, urged Bush and his brother to play on air, giving Bush his first experience of performing in public. Bush subsequently moved to San Antonio in 1952, beginning a solo career in area honky-tonks such as the Texas Star Inn, before switching to drums. During this period, he earned his stage name, when an announcer mistakenly introduced him as "Johnny Bush". As a drummer, he worked for bands such as the Mission City Playboys, the Texas Plainsmen, and the Texas Top Hands.

== Career ==
=== Early years ===
Bush joined Ray Price band, the Cherokee Cowboys, in 1963, along with a young Willie Nelson and Darrell McCall. His association with Price led Bush to Nashville and a contract to sing for record demonstrations. He also played in Nelson's band, the Record Men. With Nelson's financial backing, Bush recorded his first album in 1967, The Sound of a Heartache.

=== Stardom and vocal problems ===
A series of regional hits on the Stop label, including "You Gave Me a Mountain" (penned by Marty Robbins), "Undo the Right" (penned by Willie Nelson and Hank Cochran), "What A Way To Live", and "I'll Be There" soon followed. Rock critic Robert Christgau said that Bush's version of "You Gave Me a Mountain" "brings a catch to the throat and a tear to the eye." These songs did well in Bush's native Texas, and reached the national top 20. In 1972, he was signed to RCA Records, whose Nashville division was headed by guitarist Chet Atkins. His first RCA single, "Whiskey River", was climbing the charts with airplay on countless radio stations when his voice began faltering. Bush even felt he was being punished by God for his sins. Bush has since said: "I thought because of my promiscuous behavior and bad choices and being raised as a Baptist, that it was a punishment from God."

Bush lost half of his vocal range and was sometimes unable to talk. RCA dropped him in 1974 after three albums, he developed a drug habit, and was often stricken with performance anxiety when he was able to perform at all. After several misdiagnoses, doctors diagnosed the cause in 1978 when they discovered he had a rare neurological disorder called spasmodic dysphonia. Although this did not prevent him from recording, Bush's career began to take a downturn. He worked with a vocal coach in 1985, and was able to regain 70% of his original voice.

=== Later years ===
Bush teamed with Darrell McCall in 1986, recording a successful honky-tonk album Hot Texas Country and began assembling a large country band (as did Willie Nelson) performing around South Texas. In 1994, the band released Time Changes Everything, the same year that RCA released a greatest-hits album. A major tour soon followed. In recent years, Bush has continued to tour regularly, often performing with Nelson.

Several albums on local Texas labels soon followed. His renewed visibility made him a mentor figure to younger Texas musicians who revered the honky-tonk/hardcore country sound that Bush has done so much to keep in the public eye. Austin musicians such as Dale Watson and Cornell Hurd sought him out to play on their albums. In 2003, he was inducted into the Texas Country Music Hall of Fame with his lifelong friend Willie Nelson on hand to induct him. In 2007, he released his autobiography, with the aid of Rick Mitchell: Whiskey River (Take My Mind): The True Story of Texas Honky-Tonk, published by the University of Texas Press. A new album, Kashmere Garden Mud: A Tribute to Houston’s Country Soul, was released on the Icehouse label at the same time.

With the success of his recent botox treatments for his vocal condition and his successful career revival, Bush was a spokesman for people afflicted with vocal disorders. In 2002, he was honored with the Annie Glenn Award from the National Council of Communicative Disorders for Bush's work in bringing attention to the condition of spasmodic dysphonia. Bush self-released The Absolute Johnny Bush, a full-length album of new recordings, in June 2017. It included collaborations with Dale Watson and Reckless Kelly.

Bush died at a hospital in San Antonio on October 16, 2020. He was 85, and suffered from pneumonia in the time leading up to his death.

== Discography ==
=== Albums ===
Year	Album	US Country	Label
1968	The Sound of a Heartache	38	Stop
1968	Undo the Right	22	Stop
1969	You Gave Me a Mountain	29	Stop
1970	Johnny Bush	—	Stop
1972	Bush Country	—	Stop
1972	The Best of Johnny Bush	35	Million
1972	Here's Johnny Bush	—	Starday
1973	Whiskey River/There Stands the Glass	38	RCA
1973	Here Comes the World Again	—	RCA
1973	Texas Dance Hall Girl	—	RCA
1979	Johnny Bush and the Bandoleros; Live at Dance Town, U.S.A.	—	Whiskey River
1982	Live from Texas	—	Delta
1994	Time Changes Everything	—	TCE
1998	Talk to My Heart	—	Watermelon
2000	Lost Highway Saloon	—	Texas Music
2000	Sings Bob Wills	—	Texas Music
2001	Green Snakes	—	Texas Music
2004	Honkytonic	—	BGM
2006	Texas State of Mind	—	BGM
2006	Devil's Disciple	—	BGM
2007	Texas on a Saturday Night	—	Heart of Texas
2007	Kashmere Gardens Mud	—	Icehouse
2013	Reflections	—	Heart of Texas
2017	The Absolute Johnny Bush	—	BGM

Source: AllMusic

=== Singles ===
Year	Single	Chart Positions		Album
Year	Single	US Country	CAN Country	Album
1967	"You Oughta Hear Me Cry"	69	—	Sound of a Heartache
1968	"What a Way to Live"	29	—	Undo the Right
1968	"Undo the Right"	10	—	Undo the Right
1969	"Each Time"	16	—	You Gave Me a Mountain
1969	"You Gave Me a Mountain"	7	—	You Gave Me a Mountain
1969	"My Cup Runneth Over"	26	—	Bush Country
1970	"Jim, Jack, and Rose"	56	—	Bush Country
1970	"I'll Go to a Stranger"	flip	—	Bush Country
1970	"Warmth of the Wine"	25	42	The Best of Johnny Bush
1970	"My Joy"	44	—	The Best of Johnny Bush
1971	"City Lights"	53	—	The Best of Johnny Bush
1972	"I'll Be There"	17	—	The Best of Johnny Bush
1972	"Whiskey River"	14	7	Whiskey River/There Stands the Glass
1973	"There Stands the Glass"	34	60	Whiskey River/There Stands the Glass
1973	"Here Comes the World Again"	38	53	Here Comes the World
1973	"Green Snakes on the Ceiling"	53	—	Here Comes the World
1974	"We're Back in Love Again"	37	83	Greatest Hits
1974	"Toy Telephone"	48	—	Greatest Hits
1974	"From Tennessee to Texas"	flip	—	Greatest Hits
1977	"You'll Never Leave Me Completely"	78	—	—N/a
1978	"Put Me Out of My Memory"	99	—	Whiskey River
1978	"She Just Made Me Love You More"	89	—	—N/a
1979	"When My Conscience Hurts the Most"	83	—	Whiskey River
1981	"Whiskey River" (re-release)	92	—	Whiskey River

Source: AllMusic, unless otherwise stated.

== Sources ==
- Bogdanov, Vladimir; Chris Woodstra; Stephen Thomas Erlewine (2003). All Music Guide to Country: The Definitive Guide to Country Music. San Francisco: Backbeat Books. pp. 104–105. ISBN 0-87930-760-9.
- Bush, Johnny; Rick Mitchell (2007). Whiskey River (Take My Mind): The True Story of Texas Honky-Tonk. Austin: University of Texas Press. ISBN 978-0-292-79531-0.
- Christgau, Robert (1990). Rock Albums of the '70s: A Critical Guide. New York: Da Capo Press. p. 68. ISBN 0-306-80409-3.
- Shelburne, Craig. "Thanks to Botox, Johnny Bush Sings Again: Texas Artist Had a Hit With "Whiskey River," Then Lost His Voice". CMT News. Archived from the original on June 6, 2011.
- Wolff, Kurt; Orla Duane (2000). Country Music: The Rough Guide. London: Rough Guides. pp. 346–347. ISBN 1-85828-534-8.
- "Johnny Bush: Biography".
- "Johnny Bush: Biography". Lone Star Music.
- "Johnny Bush". CMT.com. Archived from the original on February 3, 2004.
- "Johnny Bush". Allmusic.
