= Night Life (Willie Nelson song) =

Single by Willie Nelson
- B-side: "Rainy Day Blues"
- Released: 1960
- Recorded: 1960
- Studio: Gold Star (Houston, Texas)
- Genre: Country
- Length: 2:35
- Label: RCA
- Songwriters: Willie Nelson, Paul Buskirk, Walt Breeland
- Producer: Bill Quinn

Willie Nelson singles chronology
"What a Way to Live" (1960)	"Night Life" (1960)	"The Part Where I Cry" (1961)

"Night Life" is a song written by country music singer-songwriter Willie Nelson. Nelson was inspired to write the song during one of his trips from his home in Pasadena, Texas, to his work, singing at the Esquire Ballroom in Houston.

Due to financial issues, Nelson sold the song to guitar instructor Paul Buskirk for $150. The recording of the song was rejected by Pappy Daily, owner of Nelson's label, D Records. Daily believed that the song was not country. Encouraged by the amount of money he received for the song, Nelson decided to master it at another studio. To avoid legal actions, it was recorded as "Nite Life" under the artist name of "Paul Buskirk and the Little Men featuring Hugh Nelson." In 1963 Bellaire Records reissued the single under the original title of "Night Life," recrediting it to "Willie Nelson."

== Background and recording ==
After his son Billy was born in 1958, struggling with financial issues, Nelson moved to Houston. On the way, Nelson stopped by the Esquire Ballroom to sell songs to house band singer Larry Butler. Butler refused to purchase Nelson's songs, giving him instead a $50 loan to rent an apartment and a six-night job singing in the club. Nelson rented an apartment near Houston in Pasadena, Texas, where he also worked at a local radio station as a DJ. During this time, Nelson recorded for Pappy Daily of D Records. While working at the club, Nelson used the time during the thirty-mile commute from his home to the club to write songs. One night he was inspired after thinking of the line "When the evening sun goes down, you will find me hanging 'round." Nelson's inspiration was completed on his way back, with the line "The night life ain't no good life, but it's my life."

Nelson sold the song for $150 to Paul Buskirk in 1960, while working at his school as a guitar instructor. Produced by Bill Quinn, Nelson recorded the song at Gold Star Studios. The session band was composed of guitarist Buskirk, bassist Dean Reynolds, drummer Al Hagy, pianist Bob Whitford, steel guitarist Herb Remington, and Dick Shannon on saxophone and vibraphone.

The song was rejected by Pappy Daily, who did not consider it country. Nelson, who owed Daily the recording of other songs, had sold "Night Life" for enough money to master the record at another studio. Daily threatened to sue Nelson if he pressed the song. Nelson and Buskirk took the tapes from Gold Star Studios, and went to Bill Holford's ACA Studios to master the recording. The song was recorded as "Nite Life," and credited to "Paul Buskirk and the Little Men featuring Hugh Nelson." Released through Rx Records, few copies of the single were pressed, and it received limited airplay by DJ Uncle Hank Craig on XEG.

== Later recordings ==
In 1960 Ray Price purchased the song and recorded a cover of it as the title track of his 1963 album Night Life. The song became a hit for Price who started to use it as the introduction in his shows, replacing the usual backing fiddles. Price said in the introduction to the song that it was "especially" written for him by "a boy down Texas way." The single reached number 28 on the Billboard Hot Country Singles chart. That same year, Doris Day also recorded the song for her Columbia Records album, Love Him.

The original 1960 recording by Nelson was re-released as "Night Life," for the first time under his own name, on Bellaire Records in 1963, along with its original B-side, "Rainy Day Blues." Later, it was included on the 2000 Bear Family Records compilation The Complete D Singles Collection.

Al Hirt included the song in his 1964 LP Sugar Lips, singing the verses and playing behind the chorus. In 1965, Nelson recorded the song for his RCA Victor release, Country Willie – His Own Songs. The liner notes of the album stated that "Willie writes the songs...You make them into hits," detailing the songs written by Nelson that were hits for other artists including Ray Price's recording of "Night Life."

In 1969, "Night Life" was covered by Stan Webb, the singer with Chicken Shack and issued as the B-side to a well-received cover of "I'd Rather Go Blind," sung by Christine Perfect (better known as Christine McVie, of Fleetwood Mac fame).

The song was covered by several other artists including Aretha Franklin, B.B. King, Dottie West, Don Ho, and Rusty Draper. It was a recurring staple of B.B. King's career, being featured on the live album Blues Is King and a single released around the same time. King later re-recorded it on Love Me Tender as a medley with "Please Send Me Someone to Love" (this medley is also featured on Live at the Apollo). Finally, on Deuces Wild, B.B. performed the song as a duet with Willie Nelson himself.

The song "Night Life," on the 1974 Thin Lizzy album Nightlife, borrows the title and chorus of the Willie Nelson song, but Thin Lizzy lead singer Phil Lynott is credited as the song's sole writer.

A version recorded by Nelson and trumpeter Danny Davis in 1979 reached number 20 on the Billboard Hot Country Singles chart in 1980, and number 9 on the RPM Country Tracks chart. A cover by B.J. Thomas peaked at number 59 on the Billboard Hot Country Singles chart in 1986. David Lee Roth released the song as a single from his 1994 album Your Filthy Little Mouth. Aretha Franklin released a cover on her 1998 album The Delta Meets Detroit.

== Chart performance ==
=== Ray Price ===
Chart (1963)	Peak position
U.S. Billboard Hot Country Singles	28

=== Willie Nelson and Danny Davis ===
Chart (1980)	Peak position
US Hot Country Songs (Billboard)	20
Canadian RPM Country Tracks	9

=== B. J. Thomas ===
Chart (1986)	Peak position
US Hot Country Songs (Billboard)	59

== Bibliography ==
- Bego, Mark (2010). Aretha Franklin: The Queen of Soul. Da Capo Press. ISBN 978-0-786-75229-4.
- Bradley, Andy; Wood, Roger (2010). House of Hits: The Story of Houston's Gold Star/SugarHill Recording Studios. University of Texas Press. ISBN 978-0-292-78324-9.
- Cusic, Don (2011). The Cowboy in Country Music: An Historical Survey with Artist Profiles. McFarland. ISBN 978-0-786-46314-5.
- Christe, Ian (2009). Everybody Wants Some: The Van Halen Saga. John Wiley and Sons. ISBN 978-0-470-53618-6.
- Erlewine, Stephen Thomas; Bogdanov, Vladimir; Woodstra, Chris (2003). Allmusic Guide to Country Music. Backbeat Books. ISBN 9780879307608.
- Nelson, Willie; Shrake, Bud; Shrake, Edwin (2000). Willie: An Autobiography. Cooper Square Press.
- Reinert, Al (1976). "Bringing it All Back Home". Texas Monthly. 4 (8). Emmis Communications. ISSN 0148-7736.
- Whitburn, Joel (1989). Joel Whitburn's top country singles, 1944-1988: compiled from Billboard's country charts, 1944-1988. Record Research. ISBN 9780898200706.
