= D Records =

- Founder: Pappy Daily
- Genre: Various
- Country of origin: US

D Records was an American record label located in Houston, Texas, United States. It was founded by Pappy Daily. The label closed in 1965, though George Strait recorded his first songs under the label's name from 1978-1980 until he signed to MCA Records in 1981. Daily also owned the Dart record label.

== Discography ==
- The Complete D Singles Collection, Vol. 1 (15832 Bear Family, 1995)

== Artists ==
- The Big Bopper
- Doug Bragg
- Eddie Bond
- Merle Kilgore
- Bill Carter
- Jimmy & Johnny
- Ray Campi
- Tommy Wood
- Johnny "Country" Mathis
- Jack Lionel
- Jerry Lynn
- Eddie Noack
- Benny Barnes
- Byron Johnson
- Eddie Burke
- Glenn Barber
- Merl Lindsay
- Joe Jackson
- Johnny Dollar
- Willie Nelson
- Claude Gray
- Fitz Morris
