= Asleep at the Wheel discography =

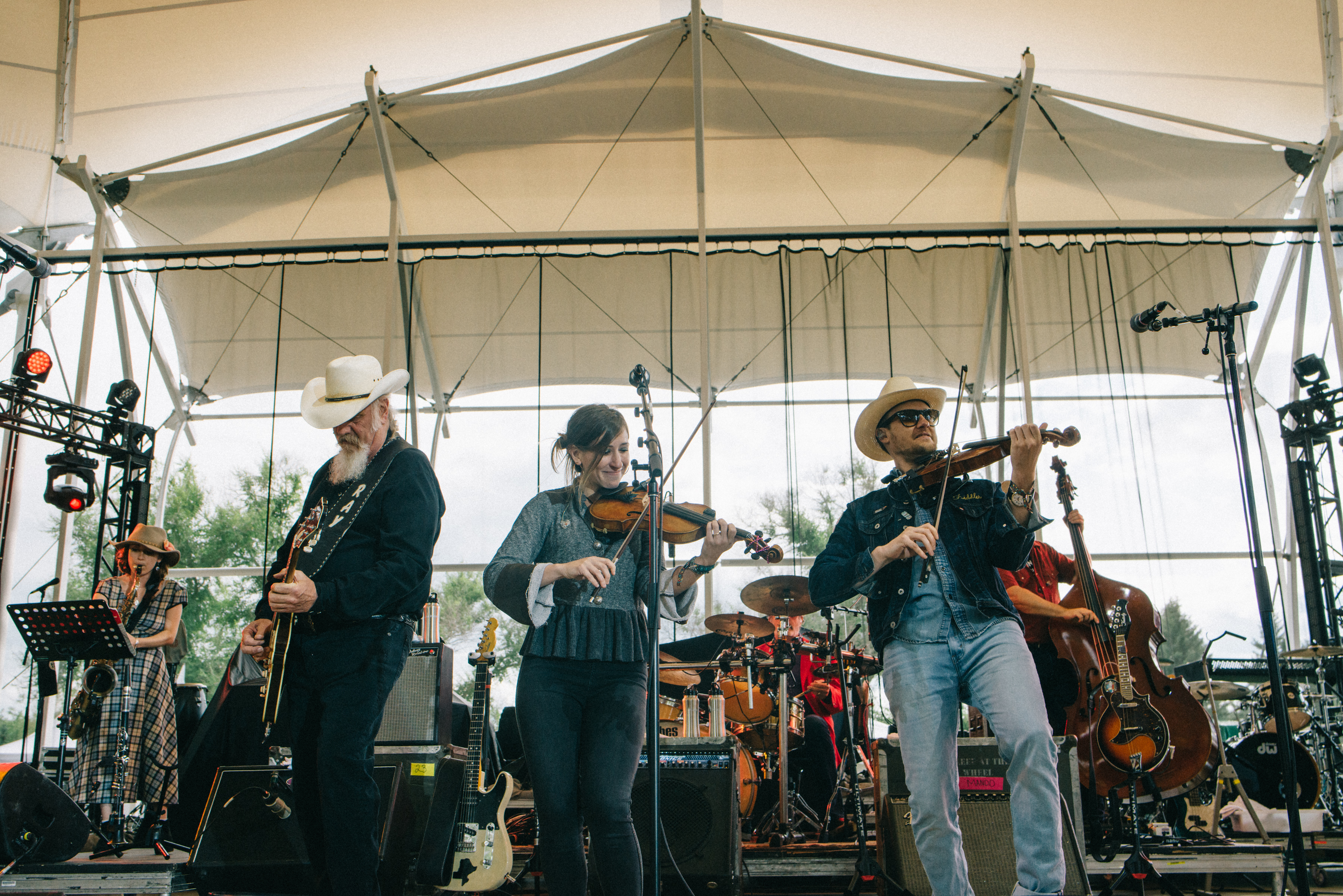
- Asleep at the Wheel performing in 2019.
- Studio albums: 26
- EPs: 7
- Live albums: 16
- Compilation albums: 21
- Singles: 40
- Video albums: 4
- Music videos: 19

The discography of Asleep at the Wheel (AATW), an American country band, consists of 26 studio albums (including collaborations and tribute albums), 16 live albums, 21 compilation albums, seven extended plays (EPs), 40 singles, four video albums and 19 music videos.

Formed in 1970, AATW released its debut album Comin' Right at Ya on United Artists Records in 1973, followed by a self-titled second album the following year on Epic. After signing with Capitol in 1975, the band issued its first charting album Texas Gold, which reached number 136 on the US Billboard 200 and number 7 on the Top Country Albums chart. Lead single "The Letter That Johnny Walker Read" reached the Hot Country Songs top ten. The following three releases, Wheelin' and Dealin' (1976), The Wheel (1977) and Collision Course (1978) all reached the top 50 of the Country Albums chart, and the first two registered on the Billboard 200. After issuing its first live album Served Live in 1979, the group signed with MCA Records and released Framed, which reached number 191 on the Billboard 200.

Between 1981 and 1985, AATW worked without a record label, before issuing Pasture Prime on Demon and Stony Plain Records. The band signed with Epic again and released 10 and Western Standard Time in 1987 and 1988, both of which reached the Billboard Top Country Albums chart top 40. "House of Blue Lights", the lead single from 10, was the band's second to reach the Hot Country Singles top ten, peaking at number 17. After two albums on Arista, the group released Tribute to the Music of Bob Wills and the Texas Playboys in 1993, which reached number 159 on the Billboard 200 and number 35 on the country chart. 1995's The Wheel Keeps on Rollin' reached number 3 on the Canadian country chart. 1997's Merry Texas Christmas, Y'all reached number 75 on the US country chart.

AATW reached number 24 on the Billboard Country Albums chart with Ride with Bob, a second Bob Wills tribute, in 1999. For the next ten years, the band released albums on various independent record labels, none of which registered on the charts. They returned to the charts in 2009 with Willie and the Wheel, a collaboration with Willie Nelson, which was the band's first release to reach the top 100 of the Billboard 200. The next year, the band collaborated with Leon Rausch on It's a Good Day, which reached number 57 on the Billboard Top Country Albums chart. A third tribute album, Still the King, reached number 11 on the US country chart in 2015.

== Albums ==
=== Studio albums ===
List of studio albums, with selected chart positions
Title	Album details	Peak chart positions				
Title	Album details	US	US Coun.	US Heat.	US Indie	CAN Coun.
Comin' Right at Ya	Released: March 1973; Label: United Artists; Formats: LP, CS	—	—	—	—	—
Asleep at the Wheel	Released: September 1974; Label: Epic; Format: LP	—	—	—	—	—
Texas Gold	Released: August 1975; Label: Capitol; Formats: LP, CS, 8-track	136	7	—	—	—
Wheelin' and Dealin'	Released: July 1976; Label: Capitol; Formats: LP, CS, 8-track	179	19	—	—	—
The Wheel	Released: March 14, 1977; Label: Capitol; Formats: LP, CS, 8-track	162	31	—	—	—
Collision Course	Released: June 1978; Label: Capitol; Formats: LP, CS, 8-track	(Note: Collision Course did not chart on the Billboard 200, but reached number 10 on the Bubbling Under Albums chart, which serves as an extension to the main chart.)	46	—	—	19
Framed	Released: August 5, 1980; Label: MCA; Formats: LP, CS	191	—	—	—	—
Pasture Prime (released as Asleep at the Wheel in the US)	Released: April 1985; Label: Demon/Stony Plain; Formats: CD, LP, CS	—	—	—	—	—
10	Released: March 1987; Label: Epic; Formats: CD, LP, CS	—	16	—	—	—
Western Standard Time	Released: August 2, 1988; Label: Epic; Formats: CD, LP, CS	—	34	—	—	—
Keepin' Me Up Nights	Released: July 1990; Label: Arista; Formats: CD, LP, CS	—	73	—	—	—
Tribute to the Music of Bob Wills and the Texas Playboys	Released: October 25, 1993; Label: Liberty; Formats: CD, CS	159	35	—	—	17
The Wheel Keeps on Rollin'	Released: November 21, 1995; Label: Capitol; Format: CD	—	—	—	—	3
Merry Texas Christmas, Y'all	Released: September 30, 1997; Label: High Street; Format: CD	—	75	—	—	—
Ride with Bob: A Tribute to Bob Wills and the Texas Playboys	Released: August 10, 1999; Label: DreamWorks; Formats: HDCD, CS	—	24	15	—	—
The Very Best of Asleep at the Wheel	Released: June 5, 2001; Label: Relentless/Nashville; Format: HDCD	—	—	—	—	—
Hang Up My Spurs	Released: January 2002; Label: Cracker Barrel; Format: HDCD	—	—	—	—	—
Asleep at the Wheel Remembers the Alamo	Released: November 4, 2003; Label: Shout! Factory; Format: HDCD	—	—	—	—	—
Santa Loves to Boogie	Released: November 7, 2006; Label: Bismeaux; Format: CD	—	—	—	—	—
Reinventing the Wheel	Released: November 14, 2006; Label: Bismeaux; Format: CD	—	—	—	—	—
Willie and the Wheel (with Willie Nelson)	Released: February 3, 2009; Label: Bismeaux; Formats: CD, LP	90	13	—	6	—
It's a Good Day (with Leon Rausch)	Released: July 20, 2010; Label: Bismeaux; Format: CD	—	57	—	—	—
Still the King: Celebrating the Music of Bob Wills and His Texas Playboys	Released: March 3, 2015; Label: Bismeaux; Formats: CD, LP, DL	187	11	—	14	—
Lone Star Christmas Night	Released: November 18, 2016; Label: Home; Formats: CD, DL	—	—	—	—	—
New Routes	Released: September 14, 2018; Label: Bismeaux; Formats: CD, LP, DL	—	—	—	—	—
Half a Hundred Years	Released: October 1, 2021; Label: Home Records; Formats: CD, LP, DL	—	—	—	—	—
"—" denotes a release that did not chart or was not issued in that region.

=== Live albums ===
List of live albums
Title	Album details
Served Live	Released: June 11, 1979; Label: Capitol; Formats: LP, CS
Greatest Hits: Live & Kickin'	Released: March 24, 1992; Label: Arista; Formats: CD, CS
Back to the Future Now: Live at Arizona Charlie's, Las Vegas	Released: May 20, 1997; Label: Lucky Dog; Format: HDCD
Wide Awake! Live in Oklahoma	Released: June 16, 2003; Label: Delta Deluxe; Format: 2CD
Live at Billy Bob's Texas	Released: October 14, 2003; Label: Smith; Format: HDCD
Live at Ebbets Field 1973	Released: 2004; Label: Bismeaux; Format: CD
The Best of Asleep at the Wheel on the Road (released as Kings of the Texas Swing in the US)	Released: October 24, 2006; Label: Madacy; Format: CD+DVD
Live from Austin, TX (featuring the Texas Playboys)	Released: November 14, 2006; Label: New West; Format: CD
Asleep at the Wheel with the Fort Worth Symphony Orchestra (with the Fort Worth Symphony Orchestra)	Released: November 5, 2007; Label: none (self-released); Format: CD
Asleep at the Wheel Live	Released: July 14, 2008; Label: One Media; Formats: CD, DL
Best in Live	Released: September 11, 2012; Label: Rendez-Vous; Format: DL
Live in America: Get Your Kicks on Route 66	Released: October 16, 2012; Label: Dance Plant; Format: DL
Live: Stateside	Released: July 22, 2013; Label: RMP; Format: DL
Havin' a Party Live!	Released: April 1, 2014; Label: Goldenlane; Formats: CD, LP, DL
Asleep at the Wheel Forever	Released: March 23, 2017; Label: Red Bus; Format: DL
Highlights of Asleep at the Wheel	Released: April 9, 2017; Label: Weishaupt; Format: DL

=== Compilations ===
List of compilation albums
Title	Albums details
Fathers and Sons (split with Bob Wills and His Texas Playboys)	Released: 1974; Label: Epic; Format: 2LP
Asleep at the Wheel	Released: 1988; Label: MCA; Format: CD
Swing Time	Released: February 4, 1992; Label: Sony Special; Formats: CD, CS
Route 66	Released: October 12, 1992; Label: Liberty; Format: CD
The Swingin' Best Of	Released: October 27, 1992; Label: Epic; Formats: CD, CS
The Best of Asleep at the Wheel	Released: 1993; Label: CEMA; Formats: CD, CS
Still Swingin'	Released: November 15, 1994; Label: Liberty; Format: 3CD
Super Hits	Released: March 23, 1999; Label: Arista; Format: CD
Back to Back (split with Bob Wills and His Texas Playboys)	Released: 2000; Label: Sony Special; Format: CD
23 Country Classics	Released: February 6, 2001; Label: EMI; Format: CD
The Best of Asleep at the Wheel: The Millennium Collection	Released: June 19, 2001; Label: MCA Nashville; Format: CD
20 Greatest Hits	Released: April 1, 2003; Label: Capitol; Format: CD
The Hits	Released: July 14, 2008; Label: One Media; Formats: CD, DL
Back to Back Live! (split with Willie Nelson)	Released: February 1, 2009; Label: Goldenlane; Format: DL
The Letter That Johnny Walker Read	Released: December 21, 2009; Label: One Media; Formats: CD, DL
House of Blue Lights	Released: December 21, 2009; Label: One Media; Formats: CD, DL
Country Legend, Vol. 3	Released: October 21, 2011; Label: JUR; Format: DL
Miles and Miles of Texas	Released: April 16, 2012; Label: Excalibur; Format: DL
Hot Rod Lincoln	Released: January 16, 2013; Label: Country; Format: DL
Snapshot	Released: January 7, 2014; Label: Bismeaux; Formats: CD, LP, DL
The Collection	Released: February 12, 2016; Label: Red Bus; Format: DL

== Extended plays ==
List of extended plays
Title	EP details
Live in Austin	Released: August 5, 2008; Label: Bismeaux; Format: DL
Daytrotter Session, Aug 8 2011	Released: August 8, 2011; Label: NoiseTrade; Format: DL
Bob's Breakdowns	Released: January 28, 2015; Label: Black & Partners; Format: DL
You're from Texas	Released: February 14, 2015; Label: Black & Partners; Format: DL
Paste Studio, Jul 26 2018	Released: July 26, 2018; Label: NoiseTrade; Format: DL
Paste Studio, Feb 13 2020	Released: February 13, 2020; Label: NoiseTrade; Format: DL
Better Times	Released: May 28, 2021; Label: Bismeaux; Formats: CD, 7" vinyl, DL

== Singles ==
List of singles, with selected chart positions, showing year released and album name
Title	Year	Peak positions		Album
Title	Year	US Coun.	CAN Coun.	Album
"Take Me Back to Tulsa"	1973	—	—	Comin' Right at Ya
"Drivin' Nails in My Coffin"	1973	—	—	Comin' Right at Ya
"You and Me Instead"	1974	—	—	Asleep at the Wheel
"Choo Choo Ch'Boogie"	1974	69	—	Asleep at the Wheel
"The Letter That Johnny Walker Read"	1975	10	32	Texas Gold
"Bump Bounce Boogie"	1975	31	47	Texas Gold
"Nothin' Takes the Place of You"	1976	35	30	Texas Gold
"Route 66"	1976	48	47	Wheelin' and Dealin'
"Miles and Miles of Texas"	1976	38	—	Wheelin' and Dealin'
"The Trouble with Loving Today"	1977	—	34	Wheelin' and Dealin'
"Somebody Stole His Body"	1977	—	—	The Wheel
"My Baby Thinks She's a Train"	1977	—	—	The Wheel
"Louisiana"	1978	—	—	Collision Course
"Pine Grove Blues"	1978	—	—	Collision Course
"Texas Me & You"	1978	75	—	Collision Course
"Choo Choo Ch'Boogie" (live)	1979	—	—	Served Live
"Don't Get Caught Out in the Rain"	1980	—	—	Framed
"Way Down Texas Way"	1987	39	—	10
"House of Blue Lights"	1987	17	12	10
"Boogie Back to Texas"	1987	53	—	10
"Blowin' Like a Bandit"	1987	59	—	10
"Walk on By"	1988	55	73	Western Standard Time
"Hot Rod Lincoln"	1988	65	—	Western Standard Time
"Chattanooga Choo Choo"	1989	—	—	Western Standard Time
"Black and White Rag"	1989	—	—	non-album single
"Keepin' Me Up Nights"	1990	54	63	Keepin' Me Up Nights
"That's the Way Love Is"	1990	60	83	Keepin' Me Up Nights
"Dance with Who Brung You"	1991	71	—	Keepin' Me Up Nights
"(Get Your Kicks on) Route 66" (live)	1992	—	—	Greatest Hits: Live & Kickin'
"Red Wing"	1993	—	—	Tribute to the Music of Bob Wills and the Texas Playboys
"Blues for Dixie" (featuring Lyle Lovett)	1994	—	—	Tribute to the Music of Bob Wills and the Texas Playboys
"Corine, Corina" (featuring Brooks & Dunn)	1994	73	—	Tribute to the Music of Bob Wills and the Texas Playboys
"Lay Down Sally"	1995	—	70	The Wheel Keeps on Rollin'
"Hesitation Blues" (with Willie Nelson)	2009	—	—	Willie and the Wheel
"Jack I'm Mellow"	2018	—	—	New Routes
"Seven Nights to Rock"	2018	—	—	New Routes
"Willie Got There First" (featuring Seth and Scott Avett)	2018	—	—	New Routes
"Half a Hundred Years"	2021	—	—	Half a Hundred Years
"Take Me Back to Tulsa" (featuring George Strait and Willie Nelson)	2021	—	—	Half a Hundred Years
"There You Go Again" (featuring Lyle Lovett)	2021	—	—	Half a Hundred Years
"—" denotes a release that did not chart or was not issued in that region.

== Other charted songs ==
List of songs, with selected chart positions, showing year released and album name
Title	Year	Chart peaks		Album
Title	Year	US Coun.	US Coun. Air.	Album
"Roly Poly" (featuring the Dixie Chicks)	2000	65	65	Ride with Bob: A Tribute to Bob Wills and the Texas Playboys

== Other appearances ==
Year	Song	Album
2018	"Chug‑a‑Lug"	King of the Road: A Tribute to Roger Miller

== Videos ==
=== Video albums ===
List of video albums
Title	Album details
In Concert	Released: April 8, 2003; Label: in-akustik; Format: DVD
Live at Billy Bob's, Texas	Released: October 14, 2003; Label: Smith; Format: DVD
Live from Austin, TX (with the Texas Playboys)	Released: November 14, 2006; Label: New West; Format: DVD
Then and Now	Released: February 18, 2014; Label: Bismeaux; Format: DVD

=== Music videos ===
List of music videos, showing year released and director(s) names
Title	Year	Director(s)	Ref.
"Way Down Texas Way"	1987	unknown	
"Boogie Back to Texas"	1987	Bob Small	
"Hot Rod Lincoln"	1988	Wayne Miller	
"Keepin' Me Up Nights"	1990	Wayne Miller	
"Old Fashioned Love" (featuring Suzy Bogguss)	1993	unknown	
"Blues for Dixie" (featuring Lyle Lovett)	1994	unknown	
"Bring It on Down to My House"	1995	unknown	
"Lay Down Sally"	1995	Mark Shuman	
"Boogie Back to Texas" (live)	1997	Dan Karlok	
"Christmas in Jail"	1997	unknown	
"Cherokee Maiden"	1999	unknown	
"Ain't Nobody Here but Us Chickens"	2001	Eric McDonald	
"Am I Right (Or Amarillo)"	2007	Dan Karlok	
"Hesitation Blues" (with Willie Nelson)	2009	Zalman King	
"Tiger Rag"	2015	unknown	
"Seven Nights to Rock"	2018	unknown	
"Jack I'm Mellow"	2018	unknown	
"Better Times"	2021	unknown	
"Half a Hundred Years"	2021	Aaron Seifert	
