= The Very Best of Asleep at the Wheel =

Studio album by Asleep at the Wheel
- Released: June 5, 2001
- Studio: Bismeaux, Austin, Texas; Bradley's Barn, Mount Juliet, Tennessee
- Genre: Country; Western swing
- Length: 49:29
- Label: Relentless Nashville
- Producer: Ray Benson

Asleep at the Wheel chronology
Ride with Bob: A Tribute to Bob Wills and the Texas Playboys (1999)	The Very Best of Asleep at the Wheel (2001)	Hang Up My Spurs (2002)

Alternative cover
- Take Me Back to Tulsa cover

The Very Best of Asleep at the Wheel is the 16th studio album by American country band Asleep at the Wheel. Recorded at Bismeaux Studio in Austin, Texas and Bradley's Barn in Mount Juliet, Tennessee, it was produced by the band's frontman Ray Benson and released on June 5, 2001, by Relentless Nashville, an imprint of Madacy Entertainment Group. The album was issued in the United Kingdom in 2003 by Evangeline Records under the title Take Me Back to Tulsa.

Despite its title, The Very Best of Asleep at the Wheel is not a greatest hits collection or other compilation; rather, it features newly re-recorded versions of some of the band's most popular songs from earlier releases. In addition to the group's regular lineup – which includes debutant John Michael Whitby on piano – the album also features several guest performers, including former steel guitarist Lucky Oceans, Johnny Gimble on mandolin and Huey Lewis on harmonica.

The Very Best of Asleep at the Wheel did not register on any record charts, but received a positive reception from critics. Reviewers praised the band's choice of songs, which they agreed served as a good introduction to the group for new listeners. Two songs from the record were nominated for Grammy Awards: "Ain't Nobody Here but Us Chickens" for Best Country Performance by a Duo or Group with Vocal and "Sugarfoot Rag" for Best Country Instrumental Performance.

== Background ==
According to Asleep at the Wheel frontman Ray Benson, the main reason the band decided to re-record several of its most popular songs was because many of their original albums were out-of-print, and the band did not own the rights to distribute them. In a feature published in Billboard magazine, the bandleader explained that "not only do we not own our records, but they're not available", adding that it would be impossible to compile the tracks in a greatest hits collection because "All our stuff is scattered over so many labels that won't cooperate". Additionally, Benson added in another interview that he "wasn't happy with how a lot of the original tunes were recorded", and that he wanted to re-record the songs with himself on lead vocals, as the original recordings featured former band members who had departed several years ago.

For the release of the album, Asleep at the Wheel signed with Relentless Nashville Records, a new label formed under the Madacy Entertainment Group. Speaking about the partnership, Benson outlined that "I'm not giving any label ownership of this record ... Our last experience with DreamWorks [Ride with Bob: A Tribute to Bob Wills and the Texas Playboys] was a disaster. I provided them with a lasting, genuine work of art ... and all they did was botch the promotion and drop us, even though we sold a quarter-million records and won three Grammys." Dave Roy, head of Relentless Nashville, commented that "There was a real comfort level" when he met Benson, noting that he signed the band because "[Although] they get little radio play, [they] continue to tour and win Grammys year after year, and they're fan favorites."

Upon its announcement, the title The Very Best of Asleep at the Wheel initially caused confusion with audiences and commentators, who believed it to be merely a compilation of previously released recordings. Benson admitted that he "didn't realize when [announcing the album] that it would cause confusion", but added that "This is my attempt ... to set the record straight. This is my chance to say, 'This is really how I like to do the songs.'" The frontman suggested that it was easy to choose which songs to record, stating that "that's what this album is, the evolution of all these arrangements over the years ... They were easy to identify as the songs we needed to do."

== Reception ==
Professional ratings
Review scores
Source	Rating
AllMusic	4/5 stars

Media response to The Very Best of Asleep at the Wheel was generally positive. In a four-star review for AllMusic, Charlotte Dillon called the album "an excellent offering that brings together many old fan favorites," adding that "The end result was worth the redoing, not that anything was wrong with the originals." Craig Havighurst of The Tennessean praised the album as "a classic collection of songs, well recorded, from one of America's best party bands," highlighting the recordings of "Get Your Kicks on Route 66", "House of Blue Lights" and "Miles and Miles of Texas" in particular. Country Standard Time writer Henry Koretzky claimed that the release "shows that Benson and company are still the very best at bringing the Texas Playboys sound to the world of contemporary country music." Koretzky also called the album "as good an opportunity as any to appreciate how effortlessly the band has always shifted from pure honky tonk country ... to the uptown swing of Louis Jordan".

== Accolades ==
The Very Best of Asleep at the Wheel earned the band two nominations at the 44th Annual Grammy Awards – "Ain't Nobody Here but Us Chickens" was shortlisted in the category of Best Country Performance by a Duo or Group with Vocal, while "Sugarfoot Rag" was nominated for Best Country Instrumental Performance.

== Track listing ==
No.	Title	Writer(s)	Original Album	Length
1.	"The Letter (That Johnny Walker Read)" (featuring Mandy Barnett)	LeRoy Preston; Ray Benson; George Frayne	Texas Gold (1975)	3:50
2.	"Ain't Nobody Here but Us Chickens"	Joan Whitney	Collision Course (1978)	3:27
3.	"Get Your Kicks on Route 66"	Bobby Troup	Wheelin' and Dealin' (1976)	3:12
4.	"Take Me Back to Tulsa"	Bob Wills; Tommy Duncan	Comin' Right at Ya (1973)	3:34
5.	"My Baby Thinks She's a Train"	Preston	The Wheel (1977)	3:48
6.	"House of Blue Lights"	Don Raye; Freddie Slack	10 (1987)	3:15
7.	"Miles and Miles of Texas"	Tommy Camfield; Diane Johnston	Wheelin' and Dealin'	3:22
8.	"Sugarfoot Rag" (featuring Brad Paisley)	Hank Garland; Vaughn Horton	Western Standard Time (1988)	3:34
9.	"Choo Choo Ch'Boogie"	Milt Gabler; Horton; Denver Darling	Asleep at the Wheel (1974)	3:21
10.	"Dance with Who Brung Ya"	Benson	Keepin' Me Up Nights (1990)	3:34
11.	"Big Balls in Cowtown" (featuring Johnny Gimble))	Hoyle Nix	Tribute to the Music of Bob Wills and the Texas Playboys (1993)	3:30
12.	"The Last Meal" (featuring Huey Lewis))	Denny Hall	Served Live (1979)	3:58
13.	"Boogie Back to Texas"	Benson	10	3:27
14.	"Texas Me and You" (featuring Eliza Gilkyson and Lloyd Maines))	Benson	Collision Course	3:28
Total length:				49:29

== Personnel ==
Asleep at the Wheel

- Ray Benson – lead and rhythm guitars, six-string bass, lead and backing vocals, production
- Cindy Cashdollar – steel guitar (tracks 3, 6, 7 and 10–13)
- David Miller – bass, backing vocals
- John Michael Whitby – piano, backing vocals
- David Sanger – drums
- Jason Roberts – fiddle, guitar, backing vocals
- Michael Francis – saxophone

Guest performers

- Lucky Oceans – steel guitar (tracks 2, 4, 5 and 9)
- Mandy Barnett – vocals (track 1)
- Carco Clave – steel guitar (track 1)
- Brad Paisley – lead guitar (track 8)
- Johnny Gimble – electric mandolin (track 11)
- Huey Lewis – harmonica (track 12)
- Eliza Gilkyson – vocals (track 14)
- Lloyd Maines – steel guitar (track 14)

Additional personnel

- Larry Seyer – engineering
- Bobby Bradley – engineering
- Lee Buddle – engineering
- Johnny Colla – engineering
- Eric Lambert – engineering assistance
- Mark Nathan – engineering assistance
- Tim Stanton – engineering assistance
- Dick Reeves – art direction, design
- Wyatt McSpadden – photography
