= Swing Time (album) =

Compilation album by Asleep at the Wheel
- Released: February 5, 1992
- Recorded: 1974; 1986; 1988
- Genre: Country; Western swing
- Length: 30:19
- Label: Sony Music Special Products
- Producer: Norro Wilson; Ray Benson

Asleep at the Wheel chronology
Asleep at the Wheel (1988)	Swing Time (1992)	Route 66 (1992)

Swing Time is a compilation album by American country band Asleep at the Wheel. Released on February 5, 1992, by Sony Music Special Products, it contains select tracks from the group's three albums on Epic Records: 1974's Asleep at the Wheel, 1987's 10 and 1988's Western Standard Time.

== Reception ==
Professional ratings
Review scores
Source	Rating
AllMusic	3/5 stars

Hank Small of music website AllMusic awarded Swing Time three out of five stars and described the album as "a fine introduction to Asleep at the Wheel's retro sound".

== Track listing ==
No.	Title	Writer(s)	Original Album	Length
1.	"Choo Choo Ch'Boogie"	Milt Gabler; Vaughn Horton; Denver Darling	Asleep at the Wheel (1974)	3:14
2.	"Don't Ask Me Why (I'm Going to Texas)"	Ray Benson; LeRoy Preston; Kevin Farrell	Asleep at the Wheel	2:49
3.	"House of Blue Lights"	Don Raye; Freddie Slack	Asleep at the Wheel	3:06
4.	"Miss Molly"	Cindy Walker	Asleep at the Wheel	2:44
5.	"Boogie Back to Texas"	Benson	10 (1987)	3:17
6.	"San Antonio Rose"	Bob Wills	Western Standard Time (1988)	4:02
7.	"Blues Stay Away from Me"	Alton Delmore; Rabon Delmore; Wayne Raney; Henry Glover	10	2:49
8.	"Walking the Floor Over You"	Ernest Tubb	Western Standard Time	2:28
9.	"Way Down Texas Way"	Billy Joe Shaver	10	2:36
10.	"Hot Rod Lincoln"	Charlie Ryan; W.S. Stevenson	Western Standard Time	2:56
Total length:				30:19
