= The Swingin' Best of Asleep at the Wheel =

Compilation album by Asleep at the Wheel
- Released: October 27, 1992
- Recorded: 1974; 1986; 1988
- Genre: Country; Western swing
- Length: 29:01
- Label: Epic
- Producer: Norro Wilson; Ray Benson

Asleep at the Wheel chronology
| Route 66 (1992) | The Swingin' Best of Asleep at the Wheel (1992) | The Best of Asleep at the Wheel (1993) |

The Swingin' Best of Asleep at the Wheel is a compilation album by American country band Asleep at the Wheel. Released on October 27, 1992, by Epic Records, it contains select tracks from the group's three albums on Epic: 1974's Asleep at the Wheel, 1987's 10 and 1988's Western Standard Time.

== Reception ==
Professional ratings
Review scores
| Source | Rating |
|---|---|
| AllMusic | 4/5 stars |

== Track listing ==
| No. | Title | Writer(s) | Length |
|---|---|---|---|
| 1. | "Chattanooga Choo Choo" (originally released on Western Standard Time, 1988) | Mack Gordon; Harry Warren | 3:19 |
| 2. | "Coast to Coast" (originally released on 10, 1987) | Fred O. Knipe | 3:06 |
| 3. | "Way Down Texas Way" (originally released on 10, 1987) | Billy Joe Shaver | 2:38 |
| 4. | "String of Pars" (originally released on 10, 1987) | Ray Benson; Larry Franklin; John Ely | 3:07 |
| 5. | "Blowin' Like a Bandit" (originally released on 10, 1987) | Guy Clark | 2:18 |
| 6. | "House of Blue Lights" (originally released on 10, 1987) | Don Raye; Freddie Slack | 3:08 |
| 7. | "Boogie Back to Texas" (originally released on 10, 1987) | Benson | 3:19 |
| 8. | "Tulsa Straight Ahead" (originally released on 10, 1987) | Jimmy Hall | 2:08 |
| 9. | "Choo Choo Ch'Boogie" (originally released on Asleep at the Wheel, 1974) | Milt Gabler; Vaughn Horton; Denver Darling | 3:16 |
| 10. | "Don't Ask Me Why (I'm Going to Texas)" (originally released on Asleep at the Wheel, 1974) | Benson; LeRoy Preston; Kevin Farrell | 2:50 |
| Total length: | | | 29:01 |

== Personnel ==
- Hollis Flatt – mastering
- M.C. Rather – mastering
- Bill Johnson – art direction
- Jennifer Gibbs – design
- Rollow Welch – design
- Antonin Kratochvil – photography
