= Route 66 (album) =

Compilation album by Asleep at the Wheel
- Released: October 12, 1992
- Recorded: 1973–1979
- Genre: Country; Western swing
- Length: 35:23
- Label: Liberty
- Producer: Tommy Allsup; Joel Dorn; Ray Benson; Chuck Flood

Asleep at the Wheel chronology
Swing Time (1992)	Route 66 (1992)	The Swingin' Best of Asleep at the Wheel (1992)

Route 66 is a compilation album by American country band Asleep at the Wheel. Released on October 12, 1992, by Liberty Records, it contains select tracks from six of the group's first seven albums, from 1973's Comin' Right at Ya to 1979's Served Live (with the exception of 1974's Asleep at the Wheel).

== Background ==
The release of Route 66 coincided with the 66th anniversary of the titular U.S. Route 66. The band also celebrated the anniversary with a run of shows at ten cities on the road's route in May 1992. Music website AllMusic awarded Route 66 a rating of three out of five stars.

== Track listing ==
No.	Title	Writer(s)	Length
1.	"(Get Your Kicks on) Route 66" (originally released on Wheelin' and Dealin', 1976)	Bobby Troup	2:50
2.	"Miles and Miles of Texas" (originally released on Wheelin' and Dealin', 1976)	Tommy Camfield; Diane Johnston	3:04
3.	"The Letter That Johnny Walker Read" (originally released on Texas Gold, 1975)	LeRoy Preston; Ray Benson; George Frayne	3:14
4.	"Don't Forget the Trains" (originally released on Collision Course, 1978)	Kevin Farrell	3:53
5.	"One O'Clock Jump" (originally released on Collision Course, 1978)	Count Basie	4:29
6.	"Take Me Back to Tulsa" (originally released on Comin' Right at Ya, 1973)	Bob Wills; Tommy Duncan	3:40
7.	"Bump Bounce Boogie" (originally released on Texas Gold, 1975)	Preston; Benson; Jim Haber	3:13
8.	"Texas, Me & You" (originally released on Collision Course, 1978)	Benson	3:27
9.	"My Baby Thinks She's a Train" (originally released on The Wheel, 1977)	Preston	3:23
10.	"Choo Choo Ch'Boogie" (live; originally released on Served Live, 1979)	Milt Gabler; Vaughn Horton; Denver Darling	4:10
Total length:			35:23
