= Live from Austin, TX (Asleep at the Wheel album) =

Live album by Asleep at the Wheel featuring the Texas Playboys
- Released: November 14, 2006
- Recorded: October 14, 1992
- Venue: Austin City Limits (Austin, Texas)
- Genre: Country; Western swing
- Length: 55:54
- Label: New West
- Producer: Cameron Strang (also exec.); Jay Woods; Gary Briggs

Asleep at the Wheel chronology
Reinventing the Wheel (2006)	Live from Austin, TX (2006)	Asleep at the Wheel with the Fort Worth Symphony Orchestra (2007)

Live from Austin, TX is a live album and video by American country band Asleep at the Wheel, featuring several former members of the Texas Playboys. Recorded at the group's appearance on Austin City Limits on October 14, 1992, it was produced by Cameron Strang, Jay Woods and Gary Briggs, and released on November 14, 2006 by New West Records. Texas Playboys members Leon Rausch, Eldon Shamblin, Herb Remington and Johnny Gimble are featured on the second half of the album.

== Reception ==
Professional ratings
Review scores
Source	Rating
AllMusic	3.5/5 stars

In a review of the album for music website AllMusic, Thom Jurek described Live from Austin, TX as "special", writing that "The bandmembers are so relaxed, open, and in the groove here that this stands out among their live recordings." He praised the performances of "Roly Poly", "Corrine, Corrina", "Blues for Dixie" and "Sugar Moon" as highlights of the collection, which he dubbed "a smoking program of rocking, strolling Western swing tunes".

== Track listing ==
No.	Title	Writer(s)	Length
1.	"Black and White Rag"	Traditional (arr. Ray Benson)	3:43
2.	"Miles and Miles of Texas"	Tommy Camfield; Diane Johnston	3:38
3.	"Boot Scoot Boogie"	Ronnie Dunn	3:45
4.	"You Don't Know Me"	Cindy Walker; Eddy Arnold	6:34
5.	"Hot Rod Lincoln"	Charlie Ryan; W.S. Stevenson	3:29
6.	"Boogie Back to Texas"	Benson	3:56
7.	"The House of Blue Lights"	Don Raye; Freddie Slack	4:06
8.	"Fat Boy Rag" (featuring the Texas Playboys)	Bob Wills; Junior Barnard	3:01
9.	"Get Your Kicks (On Route 66)" (featuring the Texas Playboys)	Bobby Troup	4:03
10.	"Corine Corina" (featuring the Texas Playboys)	Traditional (arr. Benson)	3:21
11.	"Blues for Dixie" (featuring the Texas Playboys)	O.W. Mayo	4:18
12.	"Roly Poly" (featuring the Texas Playboys)	Fred Rose	2:53
13.	"Misery" (featuring the Texas Playboys)	Wills; Tommy Duncan; Tiny Moore	3:20
14.	"Sugar Moon" (featuring the Texas Playboys)	Wills; Walker	3:15
Total length:			55:54

== Personnel ==
Asleep at the Wheel

- Ray Benson – vocals, guitar
- Cindy Cashdollar – Hawaiian steel guitar
- David Earl Miller – bass, vocals
- Ricky Turpin – fiddle, mandolin, vocals
- Tim Alexander – piano, vocals
- Michael Francis – saxophone
- David Sanger – drums

The Texas Playboys

- Leon Rausch – vocals (tracks 8–14)
- Eldon Shamblin – guitar (tracks 8–14)
- Herb Remington – pedal steel guitar (tracks 8–14)
- Johnny Gimble – fiddle and mandolin (tracks 8–14)

Additional personnel

- Cameron Strang – production
- Jay Woods – production
- Gary Briggs – production, mixing
- Billy Lee Myers, Jr. – engineering
- David Hough – engineering
- Chet Himes – mixing
- Jerry Tubbs – mastering
