= Santa Loves to Boogie =

Studio album by Asleep at the Wheel
- Released: November 7, 2006
- Studio: Bismeaux Studio (Austin, Texas)
- Genre: Country; Western swing
- Length: 33:55
- Label: Bismeaux
- Producer: Ray Benson; Sam Seifert

Asleep at the Wheel chronology
The Best of Asleep at the Wheel on the Road (2006)	Santa Loves to Boogie (2006)	Reinventing the Wheel (2006)

Santa Loves to Boogie is the 19th studio album and second Christmas album by American country band Asleep at the Wheel. Recorded at Bismeaux Studio in Austin, Texas, it was produced by the band's frontman Ray Benson with manager and engineer Sam Seifert, and released on November 7, 2006, by Benson's own label Bismeaux Productions. The album features guest performances by singers Dale Watson, Willie Nelson, Jack Ingram and Kevin Fowler on one track each.

Like the band's first Christmas album, 1997's Merry Texas Christmas, Y'all, Santa Loves to Boogie features a mix of traditional songs and original compositions written by band members and featured artists. "Pretty Paper" (featuring Willie Nelson) was originally featured on the 1997 album, while a different version of "Silent Night" was also recorded. A third Christmas album, Lone Star Christmas Night, was released in 2016 and featured several songs from Merry Texas Christmas, Y'all.

== Track listing ==
No.	Title	Writer(s)	Length
1.	"Santa Loves to Boogie"	Jason Roberts; David Sanger	2:32
2.	"Hot Texas Christmas Day" (featuring Dale Watson)	Dale Watson	3:32
3.	"Give You My Gift"	Elizabeth McQueen; Sanger	3:27
4.	"Pretty Paper" (featuring Willie Nelson) (originally recorded by Roy Orbison)	Willie Nelson	2:27
5.	"Mele Kalikimaka" (originally recorded by Bing Crosby and the Andrews Sisters)	R. Alex Anderson	2:12
6.	"Santa's on His Way" (originally recorded by Kitty Wells and the Jordanaires)	Bill Phillips; Nita Phillips	2:22
7.	"I Hate Christmas" (originally recorded by the Resentments)	Jon Dee Graham	3:00
8.	"Rudolph, the Red-Nosed Reindeer" (featuring Jack Ingram) (originally recorded by Gene Autry)	Johnny Marks	3:06
9.	"I'll Be Home for Christmas" (originally recorded by Bing Crosby)	Kim Gannon; Walter Kent; Buck Ram	4:03
10.	"Christmas in Texas" (featuring Kevin Fowler)	Ray Benson; Sanger; Kevin Fowler	3:03
11.	"Silent Night"	Joseph Mohr; Franz Xaver Gruber	4:11
Total length:			33:55

== Personnel ==
Asleep at the Wheel

- Ray Benson – vocals, guitars, production, mixing
- Elizabeth McQueen – vocals
- Jason Roberts – vocals, fiddle, mandolin, guitars
- Eddie Rivers – steel guitar, saxophone
- David Miller – bass, backing vocals
- John Michael Whitby – piano, backing vocals
- David Sanger – drums, percussion

Guest performers

- Glenn Fukunaga – bass
- Dale Watson – vocals (track 2)
- Willie Nelson – vocals (track 4)
- Jack Ingram – vocals (track 8)
- Kevin Fowler – vocals (track 10)

Additional personnel

- Dick Reeves – art direction, design
- John Wilson – cover illustration

Production personnel

- Sam Seifert – production, engineering, mixing
- Dan Skarbek – production assistance
- Bridget Bauer – production assistance
- Cris Burns – engineering
- Will Armstrong – engineering
- Mike Mercer – engineering
- Jerry Tubb – mastering
