= Ride with Bob: A Tribute to Bob Wills and the Texas Playboys =

Studio album by Asleep at the Wheel
- Released: August 10, 1999
- Recorded: June 1998 – March 1999
- Studios: Bismeaux (Austin, Texas); Hum Depot (Nashville)s; Loud Recording (Nashville); Westwood (Nashville)
- Genres: Country; Western swing
- Length: 60:18
- Label: DreamWorks
- Producer: Ray Benson

Asleep at the Wheel chronology
Merry Texas Christmas, Y'all (1997)	Ride with Bob: A Tribute to Bob Wills and the Texas Playboys (1999)	The Very Best of Asleep at the Wheel (2001)

Ride with Bob: A Tribute to Bob Wills and the Texas Playboys is the 15th studio album and second tribute album by American country band Asleep at the Wheel. Recorded between June 1998 and March 1999 at studios in Austin, Texas, and Nashville, Tennessee, it was produced by the band's frontman Ray Benson and released on August 10, 1999, as the band's only album on DreamWorks Records. The album is another tribute to the music of Bob Wills and His Texas Playboys.

Following the critical and commercial success of 1993's Tribute to the Music of Bob Wills and the Texas Playboys, Benson and Asleep at the Wheel decided to produce a second album composed of recordings made famous by Wills. As with the first album, Ride with Bob features a wide range of guest performers, including featured vocalists such as Don Walser, Reba McEntire and Willie Nelson. The album was Asleep at the Wheel's last to feature pianist and fiddler Chris Booher.

Ride with Bob was a commercial and critical success. The album reached number 24 on the US Billboard Top Country Albums chart – the band's highest position since 1987's 10 – as well as giving the group its debut on the Top Heatseekers chart at number 15. It received mostly positive critical reviews and was nominated for seven Grammy Awards, three of which it won (for Best Recording Package, Best Country Instrumental Performance and Best Country Duo/Group Performance).

== Background ==
Asleep at the Wheel decided to record a second Bob Wills tribute album for a number of reasons, including the induction of Wills and the Texas Playboys into the Rock and Roll Hall of Fame in 1999. According to the band's frontman Ray Benson, though, the album "is as much about giving the young guys a chance to record these songs as it is about keeping Bob Wills's music out there," referring to the featured artists who took part in the album's recording. Explaining that the original plan in 1993 was to release a four-album set, he noted that "The passage of six years' time has been really a blessing because we've got a wider variety of people, a whole other generation of country musicians, and a broader sampling of what Western swing was." Speaking about the featured artists, he added that "My idea on [Ride with Bob] was to draw attention to Asleep at the Wheel and Bob Wills's music by bringing in very non-Western swing artists like Tim McGraw and the Dixie Chicks. And it worked."

Recording for Ride with Bob took place between March 1998 and June 1999 at Bismeaux Studio in Austin, Texas, and Hum Depot, Loud Recording and Westwood Sound Studio in Nashville, Tennessee. The album's title was chosen to represent the collection as "a celebration" of Wills's music and influence, which Benson claimed "has not gotten the mainstream due ... [it] deserves". In reference to the selection of songs to record for Ride with Bob, Benson added that "This one has more of the styles of western swing that are so varied. We covered a lot on the last one, but this album has three big band numbers, then there's the Dixieland styles, and then there's the classic string band stuff."

Ride with Bob was released on August 10, 1999, by DreamWorks Records. All of the album's recording sessions were filmed for a making-of video to be aired as a television special around the same time as the album's release. The video, produced by Benson and Dan Karlok, was also aired at the Austin Film Festival on October 14, 1999.

== Reception ==
=== Commercial ===
Ride with Bob: A Tribute to Bob Wills and the Texas Playboys debuted on the US Billboard Top Country Albums chart at its peak position of number 24. It was also the band's first release to register on the US Heatseekers Albums chart, on which it debuted at its number 15 peak. The album reportedly sold 6,000 copies in the US in its first week. Aside from the Billboard charts, Ride with Bob also reached number 1 on the Gavin Report Americana Albums chart, with Ray Benson commenting that, "Not only is it so cool after all these years to finally have a number one record, but to be on a chart with so many great artists is amazing. You look at the other people on this chart, and it makes you feel like your music is in good company." According to Benson, the album sold around 250,000 copies.

=== Critical ===
Professional ratings
Review scores
Source	Rating
AllMusic	4/5 stars

Critical reviews for Ride with Bob were largely positive. AllMusic editor Stephen Thomas Erlewine stated, "Since [Asleep at the Wheel's] entire career feels like a living monument to Wills, it almost seems unnecessary for them to record tributes to the "King of Western Swing" – that is, until you hear the records," praising the album as "every bit as enjoyable" as the band's first Wills tribute. Billboard magazine published a review outlining that, "This Western swing tribute to the late Bob Wills is a spirited and knowledgeable stroll through Wills-era songs, aided by a star-studded cast." The Gavin Report simply called the album "remarkable".

Laura Yonkin of The Courier-Journal suggested that "While it's not quite as pristine as their previous tribute, Asleep at the Wheel makes the latest ride with Bob a pleasure." On the contrary, a writer for the San Francisco Examiner hailed the album as "more than just another sequel". The Boston Globe columnist Craig Harris was even more positive, claiming that "The new disc ... outshines its predecessor." Sandi Davis of The Oklahoman wrote that "Every cut on Ride With Bob will take you back to the great days of radio, and maybe compel you to roll back the rug and dance the night away." The New York Daily News dubbed Ride with Bob "a terrific tribute", while Jerry Sharpe for the Pittsburgh Post-Gazette called it "excellent".

=== Accolades ===
At the 42nd Annual Grammy Awards in 2000, Asleep at the Wheel received six nominations: Ride with Bob was shortlisted for Best Country Album and Best Recording Package, "Roly Poly" and "Going Away Party" were both nominated for Best Country Collaboration with Vocals, "Bob's Breakdowns" was included in the nominations for Best Country Instrumental Performance, and The Making of Ride with Bob was shortlisted for Best Long Form Music Video. Benson reportedly "didn't expect" to receive so many Grammy nominations, explaining that "I was really hoping to get maybe three [nominations], when they all started pouring in. [...] The validation is that the people who vote on these are doing what I do every day: making music, recording music, composing music, arranging music."

Ride with Bob won two of its six nominations, for Best Recording Package and Best Country Instrumental Performance (the latter of which was the band's sixth award in the category). Speaking at the ceremony, Benson suggested that he wanted to record more tribute albums in the future, explaining "I'd really like to do them for Cindy Walker, Louis Jordan & His Tympany Five, and Ernest Tubb. That's my short-list. It's very realistic. I can do them any time." The next year, "Cherokee Maiden" won the Grammy Award for Best Country Performance by a Duo or Group with Vocal.

At the 2000 Country Music Association Awards, Asleep at the Wheel was nominated for Vocal Group of the Year and the song "Roly Poly" was nominated for Vocal Event of the Year. The band also received nominations in the categories of Top Vocal Group/Duo and Album of the Year – Artist at the 35th annual Academy of Country Music Awards in 2000.

== Track listing ==
No.	Title	Writer(s)	Length
1.	"Bob's Breakdowns" (featuring Tommy Allsup, Floyd Domino, Larry Franklin, Vince Gill and Steve Wariner)	Ray Benson; Jason Roberts	3:39
2.	"New San Antonio Rose" (featuring Dwight Yoakam)	Bob Wills (arr. Tim Alexander)	3:01
3.	"I Ain't Got Nobody" (featuring Don Walser)	Spencer Williams; Roger A. Graham (arr. Benson)	3:31
4.	"Roly Poly" (featuring The Dixie Chicks)	Fred Rose	3:15
5.	"Heart to Heart Talk" (featuring Lee Ann Womack)	Lee Ross	3:26
6.	"Cherokee Maiden"	Cindy Walker	3:23
7.	"Maiden's Prayer" (featuring the Squirrel Nut Zippers)	B. Wills (arr. Alexander)	2:41
8.	"You're from Texas" (featuring Tracy Byrd)	Walker	3:14
9.	"Right or Wrong" (featuring Reba McEntire)	Arthur Sizemore; Paul Biese; Haven Gillespie	2:42
10.	"Faded Love" (featuring Shawn Colvin and Lyle Lovett)	B. Wills; John Wills	4:27
11.	"St. Louis Blues" (featuring Merle Haggard)	W. C. Handy	4:34
12.	"End of the Line"	B. Wills; Johnny Gimble	2:47
13.	"Take Me Back to Tulsa" (featuring Clay Walker)	B. Wills; Tommy Duncan	3:09
14.	"Milk Cow Blues" (featuring Tim McGraw)	Kokomo Arnold	5:52
15.	"Stay All Night" (featuring Mark Chesnutt)	B. Wills; Duncan	2:58
16.	"Bob Wills Is Still the King" (featuring Clint Black)	Waylon Jennings	2:50
17.	"Going Away Party" (featuring the Manhattan Transfer and Willie Nelson)	Walker arr. Janis Siegel	4:39
Total length:			60:18

== Personnel ==
Asleep at the Wheel
- Ray Benson – guitar, backing and lead vocals (backing on tracks 4, 10, 12 and 16; lead on tracks 6 and 8; co-lead on tracks 13–15; speech on tracks 3 and 11), production, art direction, video production
- Cindy Cashdollar – steel guitar
- David Miller – bass (all except tracks 7 and 10), backing vocals (tracks 6, 8, 12, 13 and 17)
- Chris Booher – piano (tracks 2–6, 9, 11 and 13–16), fiddle (tracks 1, 3 and 7), guitar and backing vocals (track 8)
- David Sanger – drums (all except track 7), percussion (track 7)
- Jason Roberts – fiddle (all tracks), mandolin (tracks 1, 8 and 12–14), backing and lead vocals (backing on tracks 8 and 13; lead on track 12)
- Michael Francis – tenor saxophone (tracks 2, 4, 6, 7 and 11), clarinet (tracks 2, 3, 6, 7 and 11), alto saxophone (tracks 7 and 11)

Guest performers

- Tommy Allsup – guitar (tracks 1, 2, 4, 5, 7–10, 12, 14 and 17)
- Floyd Domino – piano (tracks 1–3, 5, 6, 8, 10–12 and 17)
- Johnny Gimble – fiddle (tracks 8, 10–12, 15 and 17), mandolin (tracks 8, 11 and 12)
- Larry Franklin – fiddle (tracks 1, 5, 9 and 14)
- Dave Biller – guitar (tracks 13, 15 and 16)
- Dave Alexander – trumpet (tracks 2 and 8)
- Jody Nix – backing vocals (tracks 6 and 15)
- Jimbo Mathus – trombone (tracks 7 and 11)
- Je Widenhouse – trumpet (track 7), cornet (track 11)
- Larry Seyer – backing vocals (track 15), guitar (track 16)
- Vince Gill – guitar (track 1)
- Steve Wariner – guitar (track 1)
- Dwight Yoakam – lead vocals (track 2)
- Elias Haslanger – tenor saxophone (track 2)
- Tony Campise – alto saxophone (track 2)
- Don Walser – lead vocals (track 3)
- Natalie Maines – lead vocals (track 4)
- Tommy Nash – guitar (track 4)
- Emily Erwin – dobro (track 4)
- Martie Seidel – fiddle (track 4)
- Lee Ann Womack – lead vocals (track 5)
- Joe Manuel – guitar (track 5)
- Chris O'Connell – backing vocals (track 5)
- Larry Gatlin – backing vocals (track 5)
- Katharine Whalen – lead vocals (track 7)
- Stuart Cole – bass (track 7)
- Tim Alexander – piano (track 7)
- Chris Phillips – drums (track 7)
- Tom Maxwell – tenor and baritone saxophones (track 7)
- Tracy Byrd – lead vocals (track 8)
- Curly Hollingsworth – piano (track 8)
- Reba McEntire – lead vocals (track 9)
- Herb Remington – steel guitar (track 9)
- Shawn Colvin – co-lead vocals (track 10)
- Lyle Lovett – co-lead vocals (track 10)
- Pat Bergeson – guitar (track 10)
- Viktor Krauss – bass (track 10)
- Merle Haggard – lead vocals (track 11)
- Rick McRae – fiddle and guitar (track 12)
- Clay Walker – co-lead vocals (track 13)
- Tim McGraw – co-lead vocals (track 14)
- Mark Chesnutt – co-lead vocals (track 15)
- Clint Black – lead vocals (track 16)
- Hayden Nicholas – guitar (track 16)
- Willie Nelson – lead vocals (track 17)
- The Manhattan Transfer – backing vocals (track 17)

Additional personnel

- Buddy Jackson – art direction
- Sally Carns – art direction
- Dan Karlok – video production

== Charts ==
Chart (1999)	Peak position
US Heatseekers Albums (Billboard)	15
US Top Country Albums (Billboard)	24
