= Denver Darling =

American musician (1909–1981)

- Born: April 6, 1909; Cumberland County, Illinois, U.S.
- Died: April 27, 1981 (aged 72) Jewett, Illinois, U.S.
- Genres: Country, Western swing, Hillbilly music
- Occupations: Singer, songwriter, radio personality
- Instrument: Guitar
- Years active: 1929–1947
- Labels: Decca; MGM

Denver Darling (born Cumberland County, Illinois, April 6, 1909; died Jewett, Illinois, April 27, 1981) was an American country music performer and songwriter. He is best known for his patriotic songs of the World War II era and for his writing credit on Louis Jordan's Choo Choo Ch'Boogie.

== Early life ==
Darling was the son of farmer Luel Darling (1872-1955) and Nora (Jones) Wellbaum (1878-1959). He had two half-siblings, Iva M. Wellbaum Kuhn (1897-1988) and Oscar Luther Wellbaum (1902-1992). He was raised in the small town of Jewett. He learned to play the guitar and developed a repertoire of "hillbilly" music.

Darling's career in music started while he was attending a Citizens' Military Training Camp in St. Louis, Missouri; impressed with his skills, his commanding officer got him on air on local radio station KMOX. After the training camp was over, Darling pursued a career in radio, with his first regular gig being in 1929 on WBOW in nearby Terre Haute, Indiana. While there he met his future wife, Garnett Tucker, and married her in 1931 - reputedly to the disappointment of another WBOW regular, Burl Ives.

== Radio and live performances ==
Darling moved from station to station over the next few years, working at WSBT in South Bend, Indiana, WDZ in Tuscola, Illinois (where he sang with a young Smiley Burnette), and (by 1936) at KDKA in Pittsburgh, Pennsylvania, backing Glenn Riggs. In September 1937 he was appearing on WEEV in Reading, Pennsylvania when he got his break and started appearing at The Village Barn, one of the first country music clubs in New York City, and making appearances on WOR. Darling soon became an emcee at The Village Barn. Darling had regular shows on WOR and the Mutual Broadcasting System for periods of time in 1938, 1941, and 1945.

Darling also played live shows when not doing radio work. His performance at the Clef Music Awards ceremony on September 28, 1945, was the first time a country musician had played in Carnegie Hall.

== Recording career ==
In November 1941 Darling started recording radio programs for broadcast elsewhere in the country for the Thesaurus transcription service; they were released under the name "Denver Darling and His Texas Cowhands"; the "Cowhands" included Vaughn Horton on steel guitar and bass and the producer was Milt Gabler. On December 22, fifteen days after the attack on Pearl Harbor, the group recorded "Cowards Over Pearl Harbor", written by songwriter Fred Rose; the song was rushed out by Decca and was popular as one of the first songs to respond to the event. In February 1942 the group followed up with a number of patriotic numbers including "We're Gonna Have to Slap the Dirty Little Jap (And Uncle Sam's the Guy Who Can Do It)" by the prolific Bob Miller. The patriotic songs were well known, but the group's most popular tune of the year was recorded in July 1942: "Modern Cannonball", an update of a Carter Family tune; it reached #2 on the "Hillbilly" music chart.

In 1942 Darling also recorded several "Soundies" for Minoco, a division of the Mills Novelty Company, manufacturer of the Panoram machines that the soundies played on.

Darling's last vinyl recording session was in November 1947, with guitarist Zeke Turner and producer Fred Rose in Nashville.

== Songwriting ==
Darling had some brief success as a songwriter, mostly with veteran writer Vaughn Horton. They first collaborated on a patriotic song of 1942, "Care of Uncle Sam", a B-side for Darling.

In 1945 Darling, Horton, and Gene Autry wrote "Don't Hang Around Me Anymore" and Autry's rendition went to #4 on the country charts. Late in that year Darling, Horton, and producer Milt Gabler penned "Choo Choo Ch'Boogie"; Louis Jordan's version was a #1 R&B hit and #7 on the pop charts. It has been recorded many times, charting again for Asleep at the Wheel in 1974.

Darling's only solo hit as a songwriter was "Silver Hair, Purple Sage, Eyes of Blue"; it was sung by Roy Rogers in the movie Heldorado, released in December 1946, and released on a single by Cliffie Stone in early 1947, reaching #4 on the country charts.

== Later life ==
Darling had always wanted to return home to Illinois. After World War II he developed problems with his voice that made it difficult to sing; towards the end of 1947 Darling returned to his home town of Jewett, Illinois and became a farmer. He reportedly continued to write songs, but without national success.

Denver and Garnett Darling had three children: Ronald Luel Darling (1934-2001), Susan Jill (Darling) Ives (1940-2012), and Timothy.
