= Live at Billy Bob's Texas (Asleep at the Wheel album) =

Live album by Asleep at the Wheel
- Released: October 14, 2003
- Recorded: April 18, 2003
- Venue: Billy Bob's Texas (Fort Worth, Texas)
- Genre: Country; Western swing
- Length: 53:38
- Label: Smith
- Producer: Ray Benson

Asleep at the Wheel chronology
Wide Awake! Live in Oklahoma (2003)	Live at Billy Bob's Texas (2003)	Asleep at the Wheel Remembers the Alamo (2003)

Live at Billy Bob's Texas is the fifth live album and first video album by American country band Asleep at the Wheel. Recorded on April 18, 2003, at Billy Bob's Texas in Fort Worth, Texas, it was produced by the band's frontman Ray Benson and released on October 14, 2003, by Smith Music Group, as part of the Live at Billy Bob's Texas series. The album is the band's first release to feature fiddler and guitarist Haydn Vitera, and features former steel guitarist Cindy Cashdollar as a guest.

Although it did not register on record charts, Live at Billy Bob's Texas received positive reviews from the majority of critics. Multiple commentators praised the band's choice of songs to perform at the show, as well as the performances of several band members including the lead vocal deliveries of fiddlers Jason Roberts and Haydn Vitera on one song each. Reviewers also praised the sound and video quality of the DVD release, which also features interviews and behind-the-scenes footage.

== Background ==
Live at Billy Bob's Texas is Asleep at the Wheel's first live album and video release. Speaking about the show recorded for the collection, frontman Ray Benson commented that "if there's one place that typifies where you should see Asleep at the Wheel, it's Billy Bob's. It's as purely Texas as you can get." The performance features former steel guitarist Cindy Cashdollar as the sole guest musician, alongside regular steel guitarist and saxophonist Jim "Miracle" Murphy.

== Reception ==
Professional ratings
Review scores
Source	Rating
AllMusic	4/5 stars

Media response to Live at Billy Bob's Texas was generally positive. AllMusic's Thom Jurek wrote in a four-star review that, despite the band's prolific release schedule at the time, "This live show at Billy Bob's is scorching hot; full of tight, Western swing, R&B, blues, and honky tonk," describing it as "one of the finer Asleep at the Wheel live outings available". Jurek claimed that the album "sounds better than most folks' studio recordings", as well as praising the choice of songs to perform as "a great grab bag". Similarly, Robert Wooldridge of the website Country Standard Time praised the collection of songs performed during the show, describing it as "representative of [the band's] best work" and concluding that "With this outstanding effort, Asleep At The Wheel do their part to keep western swing vital."

Vintage Guitar columnist Steven Stone particularly praised the video release of the album, claiming that "Unlike many live-performance DVDs, this disc has excellent production values, including fine editing, good camera angles, excellent sharpness, sumptuous color saturation, and lively cinematic pacing." Describing it as "easily the best concert DVD I've seen", Stone praised recording engineers Paul Whitehead and Bob Wright and concluded that "If you are an Asleep at the Wheel fan, Live at Billy Bob's Texas is simply a must have. Even if you have only a moderate interest in western swing, this disc can turn you into a hardcore fan."

== Track listing ==
No.	Title	Writer(s)	Length
1.	"Miles and Miles of Texas"	Tommy Camfield; Diane Johnston	3:38
2.	"Get Your Kicks on Route 66"	Bobby Troup	3:27
3.	"One Six Pack to Go"	Hank Thompson; Dick Hart; Johnny Lowe	3:06
4.	"Hang Up My Spurs and Saddle"	Ray Benson	2:47
5.	"Don't Fence Me In"	Cole Porter; Robert Fletcher	3:06
6.	"Before the Next Teardrop Falls"	Vivian Keith; Ben Peters	3:39
7.	"Dance with Who Brung Ya"	Benson	3:56
8.	"Ain't Nobody Here but Us Chickens"	Joan Whitney; Alex Kramer	3:25
9.	"Amarillo by Morning"	Terry Stafford; Paul Fraser	3:11
10.	"Take Me Back to Tulsa"	Bob Wills; Tommy Duncan	3:51
11.	"You're from Texas"	Cindy Walker	2:56
12.	"If I Needed You"	Townes Van Zandt	3:56
13.	"Boogie Back to Texas"	Benson	3:53
14.	"Cotton Eyed Joe"	Traditional	4:27
15.	"Big Balls in Cowtown"	Hoyle Nix	4:20
Total length:			53:38

== Personnel ==
Asleep at the Wheel

- Ray Benson – guitar, lead vocals, production, mixing
- Jim Murphy – steel guitar, saxophone
- David Miller – bass, vocals
- John Michael Whitby – piano, vocals
- David Sanger – drums
- Jason Roberts – fiddle, guitar, vocals (lead on track 3)
- Haydn Vitera – fiddle, vocals (lead on track 6)

Guest musicians

- Cindy Cashdollar – steel guitar

Production personnel

- Randy Cole – engineering
- Paul Whitehead – engineering
- Bob Wright – engineering
- Cris Burns – mixing
- Larry Seyer – mastering

Additional personnel

- Greg Ice – design
- Randal Vanderveer – photography
