= Sally Carns =

American graphic designer

Sally Carns Gulde is an American graphic designer, who specializes in album art, especially for the music industry in Nashville. She attended Wheaton College, graduating in 1995. She received a Bachelor's degree in Sociology and Graphic Design / Photography, and was part of the college's Equestrian Club and Lacrosse team. Since 1995, she has designed album artwork for country artists including Merle Haggard, Garth Brooks, Brooks and Dunn, Blake Shelton, and Kenny Rogers.

In 1999, the National Academy of Recording Arts and Sciences presented Carns with a Grammy Award for her design of the album Ride with Bob by country swing band Asleep at the Wheel.

== See also ==
- Grammy Awards of 2000
