= Hang Up My Spurs =

Studio album by Asleep at the Wheel
- Released: January 2002
- Studio: Bismeaux, Austin, Texas
- Genre: Country; Western swing
- Length: 38:57
- Label: Cracker Barrel
- Producer: Ray Benson

Asleep at the Wheel chronology
The Very Best of Asleep at the Wheel (2001)	Hang Up My Spurs (2002)	Wide Awake! Live in Oklahoma (2003)

Alternative cover
- Digital edition cover

Hang Up My Spurs is the 17th studio album by American country band Asleep at the Wheel. Recorded during 2001 at Bismeaux Studio in Austin, Texas, it was produced by the band's frontman Ray Benson and released in January 2002 as one of the first albums on Cracker Barrel Old Country Stores' own label CB Music. Several songs on the album had been previously recorded by the band for earlier releases, while others are new compositions produced exclusively for the release.

== Background ==
In 2002, American restaurant chain Cracker Barrel Old Country Stores founded its own record label called CB Music, with the first 16 releases coming under the Heritage Music Collection banner. One of the releases was an exclusive new studio album by Asleep at the Wheel, Hang Up My Spurs. Commenting on the partnership, CB Music manager Julie Davis stated that "We thought it would be good to share Asleep At The Wheel with our customers. They've been playing western swing longer than Bob Wills did, and they are truly wonderful." Ray Benson claimed that "When asked to do the project, we jumped [at the chance]!"

== Track listing ==
No.	Title	Writer(s)	Length
1.	"Hang Up My Spurs and Saddle"	Ray Benson	2:33
2.	"T-U-L-S-A Straight Ahead" (originally recorded by Leon McAuliffe and His Western Swing Band)	Jimmy Hall	2:35
3.	"Silver Lake Blues"	Benson; Jason Roberts	2:58
4.	"I Didn't Realize" (originally recorded by Bob Wills and His Texas Playboys)	Bob Wills; Rusty McDonald	2:54
5.	"Milk Cow Blues" (originally recorded by Kokomo Arnold)	Kokomo Arnold	5:10
6.	"Beaumont Rag"	Benson; Danny Levin	3:04
7.	"San Antonio Rose" (originally recorded by Bob Wills and His Texas Playboys)	Wills	4:18
8.	"Tumbling Tumbleweeds" (originally recorded by Sons of the Pioneers)	Bob Nolan	2:48
9.	"Don't Let the Deal Go Down"	Benson; Roberts	2:37
10.	"Bubbles in My Beer" (originally recorded by Bob Wills and His Texas Playboys)	Wills; Cindy Walker; Tommy Duncan	2:25
11.	"Westphalia Waltz" (originally recorded by Hank Thompson)	Cotton Collins	3:23
12.	"Ain't Got Nothing but the Blues"	Benson	4:12
Total length:			38:57

== Personnel ==
Asleep at the Wheel

- Ray Benson – lead and backing vocals, acoustic and electric guitars, production
- Jim Murphy – steel guitar
- David Miller – bass, backing vocals
- John Michael Whitby – piano, backing vocals
- David Sanger – drums
- Jason Roberts – fiddle, electric guitar, backing and lead vocals

Additional personnel

- Cindy Cashdollar – steel guitar (track 4)
- Floyd Domino – piano (track 4)
- Chris Burns – engineering
