= Keepin' Me Up Nights =

Studio album by Asleep at the Wheel
- Released: July 1990
- Recorded: 1989–1990
- Studios: Arlyn Studios (Austin, Texas); OmniSound Recording Studio; Digital Recorders; Champagne Studios; Midtown Tone and Volume (all Nashville, Tennessee)
- Genres: Country; boogie-woogie; rock; R&B; Western swing
- Length: 40:23
- Label: Arista
- Producers: Ray Benson; Barry Beckett; Tim DuBois; Scott Hendricks

Asleep at the Wheel chronology
Western Standard Time (1988)	Keepin' Me Up Nights (1990)	Greatest Hits: Live & Kickin' (1992)

Singles from Keepin' Me Up Nights
- 1. "Keepin' Me Up Nights" Released: June 1990; 2. "That's the Way Love Is" Released: October 1990; 3. "Dance with Who Brung You" Released: February 1991

Keepin' Me Up Nights is the 11th studio album by American western swing band Asleep at the Wheel. Recorded primarily in Nashville, Tennessee, it was produced by the band's frontman Ray Benson with Barry Beckett, Tim DuBois and Scott Hendricks, and released in July 1990 as the group's first album on Arista Records. Unlike its 1988 predecessor Western Standard Time, Keepin' Me Up Nights features almost all original material, with just one cover version included.

Despite the commercial success of both 10 and Western Standard Time, Asleep at the Wheel was dropped by Epic Records and subsequently signed with the newly founded Arista Nashville imprint in 1989. For the group's first album on the new label, they worked with several external songwriters and a number of producers, including the division's founder co-DuBois. The record was Asleep at the Wheel's last to feature fiddler Larry Franklin as a full-time band member.

Keepin' Me Up Nights peaked at number 73 on the US Billboard Top Country Albums chart, the band's lowest position since 1985's Pasture Prime failed to chart. All three singles from the album – "Keepin' Me Up Nights", "That's the Way Love Is" and "Dance with Who Brung You" – registered on the Billboard Hot Country Singles chart. Reviews for the release were generally positive, with critics praising the abundance of original material as good songs for the country genre.

== Background ==
Despite the commercial success of their two albums on Epic Records – 10 (1987) and Western Standard Time (1988) – Asleep at the Wheel left the label in 1989 and signed with Arista Records, as one of the first signings for its new country imprint Arista Nashville. Barry Beckett was assigned to produce the group's debut album alongside their frontman Ray Benson. Speaking about the deal and the production of the record, the label's co-founder Tim DuBois commented that "I'd been a fan of [the band's] for many years and always felt that nobody ever marketed them properly. We tried hard to get today's technical standards with an Asleep at the Wheel feel." A number of Nashville-based country songwriters were also enlisted to contribute songs to the album, including Harlan Howard, Bobby Braddock and Fred Knoblock.

Keepin' Me Up Nights was recorded in late 1989 and mixed in January 1990 by Scott Hendricks. The album was completed with overdubbing in March, production of which was led by DuBois with engineering by Chris Hammond. The titular opening song, written by James Dean Hicks and Byron Hill, was released as the first single from Keepin' Me Up Nights in June 1990, reaching number 54 on the US Billboard Hot Country Singles chart. "That's the Way Love Is", written by former band member LeRoy Preston, followed in October, which was promoted with a cartoon series written by Kinky Friedman and illustrated by James Bennett. The single peaked at number 60 on the Hot Country Singles chart. Final single "Dance with Who Brung You", written by Benson, reached number 71 on the Billboard country singles chart.

== Reception ==
=== Commercial ===
Keepin' Me Up Nights registered at number 73 on the US Billboard Top Country Albums chart and number 52 on the Cash Box Country Albums chart.

=== Critical ===
Professional ratings
Review scores
Source	Rating
AllMusic	3/5 stars
The Encyclopedia of Popular Music	3/5 stars
Entertainment Weekly	B+
MusicHound Folk: The Essential Album Guide	2/5 stars
The Rolling Stone Album Guide	3/5 stars

Media response to Keepin' Me Up Nights was generally positive. Billboard wrote that the album featured "a variety of top-notch tunes", praising the band for performing "down-home good country music". Entertainment Weekly writer Alanna Nash stated that "the band ... is still turning out fresh and liquid Texas-style dance-hall fare ... adding just the right amount of boogie-woogie, rock, and Ray Charles-brand R&B". Similarly, The Pittsburgh Press noted that "this excellent Texas-based band proves it's not only as good as ever at its trademark Western swing, but does equally well in other forms of country music". Canadian publication RPM proposed that the album could help Asleep at the Wheel to achieve more commercial success. The Tennessean praised the record's production by Barry Beckett, Tim DuBois and Scott Hendricks. The Rolling Stone Album Guide thought that "indistinct material keeps [the album] in a predictable groove."

== Track listing ==
No.	Title	Writer(s)	Length
1.	"Keepin' Me Up Nights"	James Dean Hicks; Byron Hill	2:46
2.	"Boot Scootin' Boogie"	Ronnie Dunn	3:12
3.	"Dance with Who Brung You"	Ray Benson	3:25
4.	"Quittin' Time"	Benson; Tim DuBois	3:12
5.	"Eyes"	Bobby Braddock	3:18
6.	"Goin' Home"	Troy Seals; John Schneider	3:31
7.	"That's the Way Love Is"	LeRoy Preston	4:00
8.	"Gone But Not Forgotten"	J. Fred Knobloch; Scott Miller	2:54
9.	"You Don't Have to Go to Memphis"	Harlan Howard	2:59
10.	"Beat Me Daddy (Eight to the Bar)" (originally recorded by Will Bradley and His Orchestra and Ray McKinley)	Don Raye; Hughie Prince; Ray McKinley	3:07
11.	"Texas Fiddle Man"	Larry Franklin; Benson	3:52
12.	"Pedernales Stroll"	Benson; Franklin; John Ely; Tim Alexander; Michael Francis	4:07
Total length:			40:23

== Personnel ==
Asleep at the Wheel

- Ray Benson – lead and backing vocals, lead and rhythm guitars, production, mastering
- John Ely – pedal and lap steel guitars
- Jon Mitchell – upright and electric bass
- "Professor" Tim Alexander – piano, accordion, backing vocals
- David Sanger – drums
- Larry Franklin – fiddle, guitar, backing vocals (lead vocals on track 11)
- Michael Francis – saxophone

Guest musicians

- Greg Jennings – guitar, six-string bass
- Judy Rodman – backing vocals (track 5)
- Lisa Silver – backing vocals (track 5)
- Carol Chase – backing vocals (track 5)
- John Wesley Ryles – backing vocals (track 7)

Additional personnel

- Maude Gilman – art direction
- Mark Seliger – photography

Production personnel

- Barry Beckett – production
- Tim DuBois – production
- Scott Hendricks – production, mixing
- Chris Hammond – engineering
- Marty Lewis – engineering
- Justin Niebank – engineering
- Brent King – engineering
- Carrie Summers – engineering assistance
- Steve Bishir – engineering assistance
- Stuart Sullivan – engineering assistance
- Jeff Giedt – engineering assistance
- Phil Mezetti – engineering assistance
- Spencer Starnes – engineering assistance
- Randy Best – engineering assistance
- Denny Purcell – mastering
- Anthony Von Dollen – mastering

== Charts ==
Chart (1990)	Peak position
US Top Country Albums (Billboard)	73
