= Rick Blackburn =

American music executive

Richard "Rick" Blackburn (16 November, 1942 – 30 November, 2012) was a Nashville music executive. He was a president of Atlantic Records in Nashville and shared his skill with Mercury Records and Epic Records. Blackburn was known for hiring top artists like Ricky Van Shelton and George Jones and for dropping Johnny Cash off at Nashville Records around 1985 or 1986. He retired from the music industry in the 1990s and died in his Tennessee home of kidney failure.
