= Merry Texas Christmas, Y'all =

Studio album by Asleep at the Wheel
- Released: September 30, 1997
- Recorded: 1997
- Studio: Bismeaux (Austin, Texas)
- Genre: Country; Western swing
- Length: 43:01
- Label: High Street
- Producer: Ray Benson

Asleep at the Wheel chronology
Back to the Future Now: Live at Arizona Charlie's, Las Vegas (1997)	Merry Texas Christmas, Y'all (1997)	Ride with Bob: A Tribute to Bob Wills and the Texas Playboys (1999)

Merry Texas Christmas, Y'all is the 14th studio album and first Christmas album by American western swing band Asleep at the Wheel. Recorded at Bismeaux Studio in Austin, Texas, it was produced by the band's frontman Ray Benson and released on September 30, 1997, by High Street Records. The album includes a mix of traditional and original songs, which feature guests including Willie Nelson, fiddler Johnny Gimble and former Asleep at the Wheel pianist Floyd Domino.

Asleep at the Wheel's first Christmas album received positive reviews from a wide range of critics, who praised the band's "fun" renditions of traditional holiday songs, as well as its original compositions. The album registered at number 75 on the US Billboard Top Country Albums chart in Christmas week 1997. The band issued a second Christmas album, Santa Loves to Boogie, in 2007, followed by a third, Lone Star Christmas Night, in 2016, featuring some of the same songs.

== Background ==
Asleep at the Wheel recorded its first Christmas album at Bismeaux Studios in the summer of 1997. Merry Texas Christmas, Y'all features recordings of traditional Christmas songs such as "Feliz Navidad", "Let It Snow! Let It Snow! Let It Snow!" and "Here Comes Santa Claus", in addition to several original songs written primarily by the band's frontman Ray Benson. Willie Nelson features as a guest vocalist on his own composition "Pretty Paper" and the recording of "Silent Night", the latter of which also features Don Walser. The other featured vocalist is Tish Hinojosa, who performed on opening track "Feliz Navidad".

Merry Texas Christmas, Y'all was issued on September 30, 1997, as Asleep at the Wheel's only release on High Street Records, a subsidiary of Windham Hill. No singles were released from the album, although a music video was produced for "Xmas in Jail". In 2006 the band released a second Christmas album, Santa Loves to Boogie, which featured new recordings of two songs from Merry Texas Christmas, Y'all: "Pretty Paper" and "Silent Night". A third Christmas album followed in 2016, Lone Star Christmas Night, for which the group re-recorded three tracks: "Merry Texas Christmas, Y'all", "Xmas in Jail" and "Feliz Navidad".

== Reception ==
Professional ratings
Review scores
Source	Rating
AllMusic	3/5 stars

Media response to Merry Texas Christmas, Y'all was largely positive. AllMusic's Ross Boissoneau wrote that "Ray Benson and company have outdone themselves, with nods to traditional country ... as well as the band's stock in trade, Western swing. All in all, it's a fun and amusing way to get your fill of the sounds of the season." Similarly, Eric Fidler of The Daily News Journal noted that "The band manages to straddle categories, with a lovely straight-ahead version of "Silent Night" ... a delightfully swinging "Feliz Navidad" ... and novelty tunes such as "Xmas in Jail." The end result is one of the most satisfying Christmas albums in recent memory."

Brian Wahlert of Country Standard Time called the release "a very enjoyable Christmas album" which "promises to add swing to any Christmas party", the Los Angeles Times added that "The standard-bearers of Western swing music certainly know how to make the holiday spirit bright", and Steve Hall of the Indianapolis Star suggested that "this one's a keeper for your holiday music collection". Other publications, including the Albuquerque Journal, the Philadelphia Daily News, The Tennessean, The San Bernardino County Sun and the Wisconsin State Journal, praised Asleep at the Wheel for producing an album including humorous, fun and enjoyable Christmas songs.

Some commentators were less positive about Merry Texas Christmas, Y'all. A review published in The Cincinnati Enquirer claimed that "The western swing revival band has a great concept here, but unlike AATW's multistar Bob Wills tribute, there's too much emphasis on Ray Benson's monotone vocals. He simply can't carry the CD. Appearances by Willie Nelson and Tish Hinojosa help, but not enough." The Des Moines Register claimed that the genre did not work for Christmas music, while a writer for the Pittsburgh Post-Gazette simply wrote that the album "Doesn't work for me, y'all."

== Track listing ==
No.	Title	Writer(s)	Length
1.	"Feliz Navidad" (featuring Tish Hinojosa; originally recorded by José Feliciano)	José Feliciano (arr. Ray Benson)	4:02
2.	"Xmas in Jail" (originally recorded by the Youngsters)	Bebe Black; Jack Hoffman	2:40
3.	"Swingin' Drummer Boy"	Benson	3:19
4.	"Merry Texas Christmas, Y'all"	Benson	3:06
5.	"Pretty Paper" (featuring Willie Nelson; originally recorded by Roy Orbison)	Willie Nelson	2:29
6.	"T'was the Night Before"	Benson	3:04
7.	"Let It Snow! Let It Snow! Let It Snow!" (originally recorded by Vaughn Monroe)	Sammy Cahn; Jule Styne	3:07
8.	"Jingle Bell Boogie"	Benson	2:56
9.	"A Christmas Wish"	Johnny Gimble	3:47
10.	"Silver Bells" (originally recorded by Bing Crosby and Carol Richards)	Jay Livingston; Ray Evans	3:35
11.	"Here Comes Santa Claus" (originally recorded by Gene Autry)	Gene Autry; Oakley Haldeman	2:57
12.	"Silent Night" (featuring Don Walser and Willie Nelson)	Joseph Mohr; Franz Xaver Gruber	5:15
13.	"Swingin' Silent Nite"	Mohr; Gruber (arr. Benson)	2:44
Total length:			43:01

== Personnel ==
Asleep at the Wheel

- Ray Benson – vocals, guitar, production, mixing, mastering
- Cindy Cashdollar – Hawaiian steel and slide guitars
- David Miller – bass, backing vocals
- Chris Booher – piano, backing vocals
- David Sanger – drums, percussion
- Jason Roberts – fiddle, guitar, backing vocals
- Michael Francis – saxophone

Guest performers

- Floyd Domino – piano
- Johnny Gimble – fiddle
- Willie Nelson – vocals (tracks 5 and 12)
- Tish Hinojosa – vocals (track 1)
- Bradley Jaye Williams – accordion (track 1)
- Herb Remington – steel guitar (track 10)
- Don Walser – vocals (track 12)

Production personnel

- Larry Seyer – engineering, mixing (all except tracks 5 and 13), mastering
- Frank Campbell – engineering, mixing (tracks 5 and 13)
- Allen Crider – engineering
- David Gratz – engineering

Additional personnel

- Sonny Mediana – art direction
- Tracy Lamonica – photography

== Charts ==
Chart (1997)	Peak position
US Top Country Albums (Billboard)	75
