= Reinventing the Wheel (album) =

Studio album by Asleep at the Wheel
- Released: November 14, 2006
- Studio: Bismeaux Studio (Austin, Texas)
- Genre: Country; Western swing
- Length: 43:38
- Label: Bismeaux
- Producer: Asleep at the Wheel; Sam Seifert

Asleep at the Wheel chronology
Santa Loves to Boogie (2006)	Reinventing the Wheel (2006)	Live from Austin, TX (2006)

Reinventing the Wheel is the 20th studio album by American country band Asleep at the Wheel. Recorded at Bismeaux Studio in Austin, Texas, it was produced by the band with manager/engineer Sam Seifert and released on November 14, 2006 by Ray Benson's record label Bismeaux Productions. The release is the band's first studio album to feature steel guitarist Eddie Rivers and vocalist Elizabeth McQueen, as well as the last to feature pianist John Michael Whitby as an official member.

Although it didn't chart, Reinventing the Wheel received positive reviews from a number of critics. Several commentators praised the presence of three lead vocalists in Benson, McQueen and fiddler Jason Roberts, which they likened to the group's early material featuring co-vocalists Chris O'Connell and LeRoy Preston. The album features appearances from four guest artists, each on one track – the Blind Boys of Alabama, James Rabitoy, Rolf Sieker, and the band's former pianist Floyd Domino.

== Background ==
Reinventing the Wheel is Asleep at the Wheel's first album to feature a female co-lead vocalist since Chris O'Connell's departure in 1986, following the release of Pasture Prime. Reviewing the album for Vintage Guitar magazine, Dan Forte explained that on the collection, "the group reclaims its multi-pronged, three-vocalist approach, with Elizabeth McQueen and fiddle prodigy Jason Roberts getting almost as much face time as [frontman Ray] Benson", which he highlights as a strength of the release. At the time of its release, McQueen described Reinventing the Wheel as a reflection of the band's original vision, commenting that "It's come full circle ... and it's back to that original review concept of Asleep at the Wheel, with lots of different styles of music and different singers trading off."

== Reception ==
Professional ratings
Review scores
Source	Rating
AllMusic	3/5 stars
Vintage Guitar	Favorable

Critical response to Reinventing the Wheel was positive. Reviewing the album for AllMusic, Thom Jurek described it as "a fine effort," writing that "This band may be an institution, but they still have inspiration, chops, and hardcore swing in spades to dish out to listeners." Vintage Guitar writer Dan Forte suggested that "Not every choice hits its mark", but proclaimed that "This Wheel is still rolling strong." In a review for radio station WYCE, Gregg Saur wrote that "After only one listen to this disc you will discover that this band brings as much fun, swing, boogie-woogie and old time western sounds as any disc of their 38 year career."

Ray Benson won the Austin Chronicle Austin Music Award for Best Record Producer in 2007 for his work on Reinventing the Wheel. The album itself was nominated for Album of the Year, but lost out to Brotherhood by Del Castillo.

== Track listing ==
No.	Title	Writer(s)	Length
1.	"The Devil Ain't Lazy" (originally recorded by Bob Wills and His Texas Playboys) (featuring the Blind Boys of Alabama)	Fred Rose	2:47
2.	"Your Mind Is on Vacation" (originally recorded by Mose Allison)	Mose Allison	3:35
3.	"I Don't Care if the Sun Don't Shine" (originally recorded by Tony Martin)	Mack David	2:39
4.	"Am I Right (Or Amarillo)"	Jason Roberts	3:33
5.	"This Ol' Cowboy" (originally recorded by the Marshall Tucker Band)	Toy Caldwell	5:17
6.	"I'm an Old Cow Hand" (originally recorded by Bing Crosby)	Johnny Mercer; Harry Warren	2:49
7.	"Pop a Wheelie"	Ray Benson; Roberts	2:28
8.	"Misery" (originally recorded by Bob Wills and His Texas Playboys)	Bob Wills; Tommy Duncan	3:10
9.	"Hot Like That"	Benson	3:03
10.	"Saturday Night Fish Fry" (originally recorded by Louis Jordan and His Tympany Five)	Louis Jordan; Ellis Walsh	5:16
11.	"You're My Sugar" (originally recorded by Kay Starr and Tennessee Ernie)	Irving Taylor; Han Stanley	3:48
12.	"The Cape" (originally recorded by Guy Clark)	Guy Clark; Susanna Clark; Jim Janosky	5:13
Total length:			43:38

== Personnel ==
Asleep at the Wheel

- Ray Benson – lead and backing vocals, guitars, production, liner notes
- Elizabeth McQueen – lead and backing vocals, production
- Eddie Rivers – steel guitar, saxophone, production
- David Miller – bass, backing vocals, production
- John Michael Whitby – piano, backing vocals, production
- David Sanger – drums, percussion, production
- Jason Roberts – fiddle, electric mandolin, guitars, backing and lead vocals, production

Guest musicians

- The Blind Boys of Alabama – vocals (track 1)
- James Rabitoy – percussion (track 5)
- Rolf Sieker – banjo (track 7)
- Floyd Domino – piano (track 9)

Additional personnel

- Sam Seifert – production, engineering
- Dan Skarbek – production assistance
- Bridget Bauer – production assistance
- Cris Burns – additional engineering
- Will Armstrong – additional engineering
- Mike Mercer – additional engineering
- Hank Williams – mastering
- Dick Reeves – art direction, design
- Helen Pryor – art direction, design
- Scrojo – cover illustration
- Ed Verosky – photography
- Brio Yiapan – additional photography
