= Wild Texas Wind =

- Genre: Drama; Music; Thriller
- Written by: Mark Kiracofe; Dolly Parton
- Directed by: Joan Tewkesbury
- Starring: Dolly Parton; Gary Busey; Ray Benson; Dennis Letts; Willie Nelson
- Music by: Ray Benson; Dolly Parton
- Country of origin: United States
- Original language: English

Production
- Executive producer: Howard Rosenman
- Producers: Richard L. O'Connor; Fred Berner; Robert Chartoff
- Editor: Richard E. Rabjohn
- Running time: 96 min.
- Production company: Sandollar Productions

Original release
- Network: NBC
- Release: September 23, 1991

Wild Texas Wind is a 1991 American made-for-television drama film directed by Joan Tewkesbury and starring Dolly Parton, Gary Busey, and Ray Benson. Parton co-wrote the story with Mark Kiracofe, as well as multiple songs from the film with Benson. The film was produced by Sandollar Productions.

== Plot ==
The story centers around singer Thiola Rayfield (Parton) and her band Big T and the Texas Wheel. The plot follows the band's climb to success and Thiola's tumultuous relationship with their violently abusive, alcoholic manager Justice Parker (Busey). In the midst of the chaos, a murder occurs, leaving authorities with a trio of suspects and a mystery to solve.

== Cast ==
- Dolly Parton as Thiola Rayfield
- Gary Busey as Justice Parker
- Ray Benson as Ben Rayson
- Dennis Letts as Harlan Fowler
- Willie Nelson as Himself

== Production ==
The film was shot on location in Austin, Texas. Club scenes were filmed in an at-the-time new south Austin C&W dance hall where several hundred people enjoyed the good C&W bands on a big dance floor during the 1990s. Still an active club which has operated under several names since the 1990s on Ben White Blvd near I-35.

== Music ==
The film features original music by Ray Benson and Dolly Parton. No soundtrack was ever released. The title song was written by Carl Perkins and released on his 1992 album Friends, Family & Legends as well as on his 1996 album Go Cat Go! in a new version with Willie Nelson.

The songs in the film are:

- "Big T" (performed by Dolly Parton)
- "There's a Ring Around the Moon Tonight" (performed by Dolly Parton)
- "Say It's True" (performed by Ray Benson & Dolly Parton)
- "Road Happy/On the Road Again" (performed by Ray Benson, Dolly Parton, & Willie Nelson)
- "Why Does It Have to Be" (performed by Dolly Parton)
- "Swingin' Like Tarzan & Jane" (performed by Ray Benson & Dolly Parton)
- "Farther Along" (performed a cappella by Dolly Parton)
- "Leave That Cowboy Alone" (performed by Ray Benson & Dolly Parton)
- "Wild Texas Wind" (performed by Dolly Parton)
- "Speakin' of the Devil" (performed by Dolly Parton)
- "Tall Man" (performed by Ray Benson & Dolly Parton)
- "My Songbird" (performed by Willie Nelson)
- "Big T/On the Road Again" (performed by Dolly Parton, Ray Benson, & Willie Nelson)
- "Wild Texas Wind Theme" (instrumental score)

== Reception ==
=== Viewership data ===
The film premiered to 18 million viewers and a 27 share amongst television households, making it the top rated program of the night of its premiere.

=== Critical response ===
The film received mixed reviews from critics. Ken Tucker of Entertainment Weekly gave the film a positive review, praising the cast's performances and calling the film "pleasingly unexpected."
