= Western Standard Time (album) =

Studio album by Asleep at the Wheel
- Released: August 2, 1988
- Recorded: 1988
- Studio: Arlyn Studios (Austin, Texas); Austin Recording (Austin, Texas); Bee Creek (Austin, Texas); January Sound (Dallas, Texas); Pedernales Recording (Spicewood, Texas); The Fire Station (San Marcos, Texas)
- Genre: Country; Western swing
- Length: 31:44
- Label: Epic
- Producer: Ray Benson

Asleep at the Wheel chronology
10 (1987)	Western Standard Time (1988)	Keepin' Me Up Nights (1990)

Singles from Western Standard Time
- 1. "Walk on By" Released: June 1988; 2. "Hot Rod Lincoln" Released: September 1988; 3. "Chattanooga Choo Choo" Released: March 1989

Western Standard Time is the tenth studio album by American country band Asleep at the Wheel. Recorded at various studios in Austin, Dallas, Briarcliff and San Marcos, Texas it was produced solely by the band's frontman Ray Benson and released in August 1988 as the group's second album back on Epic Records. Western Standard Time is the band's first album to feature no original material, relying on recordings of compositions originally by popular swing, R&B and big band artists.

Asleep at the Wheel remained with Epic following the commercial success of its 1987 ninth studio album 10, which reached the top 20 of the US Billboard Top Country Albums chart and spawned four charting singles. After one lineup change, Jon Mitchell taking over from bassist David Dawson, the group recorded the album's follow-up in 1988. The first two singles from Western Standard Time – "Walk on By" and "Hot Rod Lincoln" – registered on the Billboard Hot Country Singles chart.

Western Standard Time received mixed reviews from critics. Several commentators praised the band's choice of songs to record on the album, which were described as "fun" and "light-hearted". However, other writers criticised the lack of original compositions and dismissed the cover versions as merely "novelties". The album was Asleep at the Wheel's fourth release to reach the top 40 of the Billboard Top Country Albums chart, peaking at number 34 and selling over 100,000 copies.

== Background ==
Following the release and touring in promotion of 10, bassist David Dawson was replaced by Jon Mitchell in the summer of 1988. He made his debut for the band on Western Standard Time, which was released by Epic in the first week of August 1988. The album's recording of Leroy Van Dyke's "Walk on By" was issued as its first single in June, reaching number 57 on the US Billboard Hot Country Singles chart. "Hot Rod Lincoln", originally recorded by Arkie Shibley, followed in October and peaked at number 65 on the chart. "Chattanooga Choo Choo" was issued as the final single from the album in March 1989.

== Reception ==
=== Commercial ===
Western Standard Time debuted on the US Billboard Top Country Albums chart at number 57 in September 1988. The following month, it peaked at number 34. The album reached number 36 on the Cash Box equivalent chart. Western Standard Time reportedly sold approximately 100,000 copies.

=== Critical ===
Professional ratings
Review scores
Source	Rating
AllMusic	4.5/5 stars
Tom Hull – on the Web	B+

Media response to Western Standard Time was generally positive. Chicago Tribune columnist Jack Hurst wrote that "This is the kind of sound that gets your blood racing-and in a most pleasurable, nostalgic kind of way," praising the band's "individualistic renditions of 10 oldies but goodies". British publication Music Week described the collection as an "undemandingly pleasant album of standards of the [country] genre", while the Detroit Free Press dubbed it "Fabulous, light-hearted stuff for retro fans." Similarly, New York Daily News published a review stating that "It's like plugging in a 1940s jukebox ... a Saturday-night sound that's both rowdy and respectful." AllMusic's Mark A. Humphrey gave the album four and a half out of five stars and simply wrote, "Nicely done Western standards."

Billboard magazine agreed that "[the] album does well resurrecting such light fare as "Chattanooga Choo Choo," "Hot Rod Lincoln," and "That's What I Like About The South,"" but retorted with the claim that "it flops in trying to revive "That Lucky Old Sun," "Walk On By," and other serious numbers." The Asbury Park Press shared a concern along similar lines, but criticised the "shameless novelty tunes" (including "Chattanooga Choo Choo" to "Hot Rod Lincoln") as "embarrassing", and hailed the "reworked country classics" (such as "Walk on By" and "Walking the Floor Over You") as "a lot of fun". A review in the Pottsville Republican was similarly mixed, admitting the album had "limitations" but praising several of its songs.

=== Accolades ===
Western Standard Time earned Asleep at the Wheel its third Grammy Award, and the third for Best Country Instrumental Performance, which it won for "Sugarfoot Rag".

== Track listing ==
No.	Title	Writer(s)	Length
1.	"Chattanooga Choo Choo" (originally recorded by Glenn Miller and His Orchestra)	Mack Gordon; Harry Warren	3:17
2.	"Don't Let Go" (originally recorded by Jesse Stone)	Jesse Stone	3:01
3.	"Hot Rod Lincoln" (originally recorded by Arkie Shibley and His Mountain Dew Boys)	Charlie Ryan; W.S. Stevenson	2:55
4.	"That's What I Like 'Bout the South" (originally recorded by Bob Wills and His Texas Playboys)	Andy Razaf	2:35
5.	"That Lucky Old Sun (Just Rolls Around Heaven All Day)" (originally recorded by Vaughn Monroe and His Orchestra)	Haven Gillespie; Beasley Smith	3:50
6.	"Walk on By" (originally recorded by Leroy Van Dyke)	Kendall Hayes	2:48
7.	"San Antonio Rose" (originally recorded by Bob Wills and His Texas Playboys)	Bob Wills	4:01
8.	"Roly Poly" (originally recorded by Bob Wills and His Texas Playboys)	Fred Rose	3:10
9.	"Sugarfoot Rag" (originally recorded by Hank Garland)	Hank Garland; Vaughn Horton	3:40
10.	"Walking the Floor Over You" (originally recorded by Ernest Tubb)	Ernest Tubb	2:27
Total length:			31:44

== Personnel ==
Asleep at the Wheel

- Ray Benson – guitar, vocals, six-string bass, string arrangements, production, engineering
- John Ely – pedal and Hawaiian steel guitars
- Jon Mitchell – bass
- Tim Alexander – piano, vocals, string arrangements
- David Sanger – drums
- Larry Franklin – fiddle, guitar, vocals
- Michael Francis – saxophone

Guest musicians

- Chris O'Connell – vocals
- Larry Seyer – rhythm guitar, vocals, bass (track 5), engineering, mixing
- Tony Garnier – upright and six-string bass
- Johnny Gimble – fiddle, mandolin, vocals
- Willie Nelson – vocals (track 1)

Production personnel

- Spencer Starnes – engineering
- Larry Greenhill – engineering
- Bobby Arnold – engineering
- Chris Hammond – engineering
- Gary Higginbotham – engineering
- Gary Powell – engineering
- Marty Lewis – mixing
- Denny Purcell – mastering

Additional personnel

- Bill Johnson – art direction
- Peter DeLory – artwork, photography

== Charts ==
Chart (1988)	Peak position
US Hot Country LPs (Billboard)	34
