= Sony Music Special Products =

- Founded: 1990s
- Founder: Sony Music Custom Marketing Group
- Country of origin: United States

Sony Music Special Products is record label of Sony Music Custom Marketing Group. It is headed by Richard Chechilo. Its primary products are premium and special offer CDs, digital downloads and ringtones.

== See also ==
- List of record labels
