= 10 (Asleep at the Wheel album) =

Studio album by Asleep at the Wheel
- Released: March 1987
- Recorded: Late 1986
- Studios: Bee Creek Studios (Spicewood, Texas); Austin Recording Studio (Austin, Texas)
- Genre: Western swing
- Length: 29:37
- Label: Epic
- Producers: Ray Benson; Huey Lewis

Asleep at the Wheel chronology
Pasture Prime (1985)	10 (1987)	Western Standard Time (1988)

Singles from 10
- 1. "Way Down Texas Way" Released: January 1987; 2. "House of Blue Lights" Released: May 1987; 3. "Boogie Back to Texas" Released: September 1987; 4. "Blowin' Like a Bandit" Released: November 1987

10 is the ninth studio album (tenth album overall) by American western swing band Asleep at the Wheel. Recorded at Bee Creek Studios in Spicewood, Texas and the Austin Recording Studio in Austin, Texas, it was produced solely by the band's frontman Ray Benson and released in March 1987 as the group's first album back on Epic Records. 10 was the group's first album on a major label since 1980's Framed, and its first to register on the US Billboard charts since 1978's Wheelin' and Dealin'.

Following the release of Pasture Prime in 1985, Asleep at the Wheel experienced a resurgence in popularity which led to them re-signing with Epic. The group settled with a new lineup of Benson, steel guitarist John Ely, bassist David Dawson, pianist Tim Alexander, drummer David Sanger, fiddler Larry Franklin and saxophonist Michael Francis, four of whom had featured on the 1985 record. 10 was the band's first album since the departure of Chris O'Connell, although she appears as a guest.

10 was a critical and commercial success. The album was Asleep at the Wheel's second release to reach the top 20 of the US Billboard Top Country Albums chart, peaking at number 16. The collection also spawned four singles, all of which registered on the Hot Country Singles chart, with "House of Blue Lights" peaking at number 17 – the band's second to reach the top 20 of the chart. Critical reviews of the album were mainly positive, praising its return to the band's Western swing sound.

== Background ==
In 1986, Asleep at the Wheel introduced a new lineup comprising lead vocalist and guitarist Ray Benson, steel guitarist John Ely, bassist David Dawson, pianist Tim Alexander, drummer David Sanger, fiddler Larry Franklin and saxophonist Michael Francis. The band signed with Epic Records and recorded its ninth studio album that year, which was its first since Chris O'Connell's departure after becoming pregnant. In early 1987, Epic imprint CBS/Nashville Senior Vice President Rick Blackburn reported that the album was "just about done", claiming that "They're better now than they've ever been and their confidence level is soaring".

"Way Down Texas Way" (written by Billy Joe Shaver) was issued as the lead single from 10 in January 1987, reaching number 39 on the US Billboard Hot Country Singles chart. The album was released in March. "House of Blue Lights" (first recorded by Freddie Slack) was released as the album's second single in May and became the band's second song to reach the top 20 of the Billboard country chart, peaking at number 17. Two more tracks were issued from 10 and registered on the Hot Country Singles chart – Ray Benson's "Boogie Back to Texas" peaked at number 53, and Guy Clark's "Blowin' Like a Bandit" peaked at number 59.

== Reception ==
=== Commercial ===
10 entered the Billboard Top Country Albums chart at number 45 in April 1987, later becoming the band's third album (and their first release in eleven years) to reach the top 20 when it peaked at number 16 in July. It also reached number 12 on the Cash Box Country Albums chart.

=== Critical ===
Media reviews of 10 were generally positive. Billboard magazine described the album as "a solid collection of mainly Western swing numbers", praising "House of Blue Lights", "I Want a New Drug" and "Blues Stay Away from Me" in particular. Cash Box also highlighted the Freddie Slack and Delmore Brothers tracks, as well as Fontaine Brown's "Big Foot Stomp". Canadian magazine RPM outlined that "[the band's] brand of Western swing music is almost legend", hailing the record as "a fun album" and describing it as "the real country mood music".

=== Accolades ===
10 earned Asleep at the Wheel its second Grammy Award, winning Best Country Instrumental Performance for its original track "String of Pars".

== Track listing ==
No.	Title	Writer(s)	Length
1.	"Way Down Texas Way"	Billy Joe Shaver	2:37
2.	"Tulsa Straight Ahead" (originally recorded by Leon McAuliffe and His Western Swing Band)	Jimmy Hall	2:06
3.	"Coast to Coast" (originally recorded by Fred O. Knipe)	Fred O. Knipe	3:05
4.	"House of Blue Lights" (originally recorded by Freddie Slack and Ella Mae Morse)	Don Raye; Freddie Slack	3:07
5.	"Blowin' Like a Bandit" (originally recorded by Guy Clark)	Guy Clark	2:17
6.	"I Want a New Drug" (originally recorded by Huey Lewis and the News)	Huey Lewis; Chris Hayes	3:41
7.	"Big Foot Stomp"	Fontaine Brown	3:33
8.	"Boogie Back to Texas"	Ray Benson	3:17
9.	"String of Pars"	Benson; Larry Franklin; John Ely	3:07
10.	"Blues Stay Away from Me" (originally recorded by the Delmore Brothers)	Alton Delmore; Rabon Delmore; Wayne Raney; Henry Glover	2:47
Total length:			29:37

== Personnel ==
Asleep at the Wheel

- Ray Benson – lead guitar, vocals, production
- John Ely – pedal and Hawaiian steel guitars
- David Dawson – bass
- Tim Alexander – piano, accordion, backing vocals
- David Sanger – drums
- Larry Franklin – fiddle, guitar, backing vocals
- Michael Francis – saxophone

Guest musicians

- Tom Anastasio – bass
- Chris O'Connell – backing vocals
- Johnny Gimble – fiddle (track 1)
- Pete Anderson – guitar (track 6)
- Ray Campi – slap bass (track 6)

Production personnel

- Huey Lewis – production (track 6)
- Leea Mechling – production assistance
- Spencer Starnes – engineering
- John Bentley – engineering assistance
- Joe Bogan – remixing
- Larry Seyer – remixing
- Denny Purcell – mastering

Additional personnel

- Bill Johnson – art direction
- Antonin Kratochvil – photography
- Scott Newton – photography assistance

== Charts ==
Chart (1987)	Peak position
US Hot Country LPs (Billboard)	16
