= Sugar-Foot Rag =

Single by Jerry Reed

from the album Texas Bound and Flyin'
- B-side: "I'm Wanna Go Back Home To Georgia"
- Released: November 5, 1979
- Genre: Country
- Length: 2:24
- Label: RCA
- Songwriters: Hank Garland, Vaughn Horton
- Producers: Ray Pennington, Ronnie Gant

Jerry Reed singles chronology
| "Hot Stuff" (1979) | "Sugar-Foot Rag" (1979) | "Age" (1980) |

"Sugar-Foot Rag" (or Sugarfoot Rag) is a song written by Hank Garland and Vaughn Horton (given on Red Foley's record label as George Vaughn; both were aliases for songwriter George Vaughn Horton). It was originally recorded by Garland on August 26, 1949, and released in 1949, selling over a million records. It was then recorded by American country music artist Red Foley on November 10, 1949. It was also recorded by American country music artist Jerry Reed and released in November 1979 as the lead single from his album, Texas Bound and Flyin. The song reached a peak of number 12 on the U.S. Billboard Hot Country Singles chart and number 13 on the Canadian RPM Country Tracks chart. Junior Brown covered "Sugar Foot Rag" on his 1993 album Guit with It.

== Chart performance ==
=== Red Foley ===
| Chart (1950) | Peak position |
|---|---|
| U.S. Billboard Hot Country Singles | 4 |
| U.S. Billboard Hot 100 | 24 |

=== Jerry Reed ===
| Chart (1979–1980) | Peak position |
|---|---|
| U.S. Billboard Hot Country Singles | 12 |
| Canadian RPM Country Tracks | 13 |
