= Asleep at the Wheel (album) =

Studio album by Asleep at the Wheel
- Released: September 1974
- Recorded: July 1974
- Studio: Columbia Studio B (Nashville, Tennessee)
- Genre: Western swing
- Length: 38:06
- Label: Epic
- Producer: Norro Wilson

Asleep at the Wheel chronology
Comin' Right at Ya (1973)	Asleep at the Wheel (1974)	Texas Gold (1975)

Singles from Asleep at the Wheel
- 1. "You and Me Instead" Released: August 1974; 2. "Choo Choo Ch'Boogie" Released: November 1974

Asleep at the Wheel is the second album by American western swing band Asleep at the Wheel. It was produced by Norro Wilson at Columbia Studio B in Nashville, Tennessee and released in September 1974 as the group's first album on Epic Records. As with its predecessor Comin' Right at Ya, Asleep at the Wheel's self-titled album featured a mix of traditional and original compositions, including songs written by popular country musicians Rex Griffin, Cindy Walker and Hank Penny.

The second album by Asleep at the Wheel was the first to feature bassist Tony Garnier, who replaced Gene Dobkin in early 1974 and would remain with the band for several years. It was also the only album to feature the group's first full-time fiddler Richard "Corky" Casanova, who joined in time for the album's recording but left shortly after its release. Guest contributors include Johnny Gimble on fiddle and mandolin, Andy Stein on saxophone and fiddle, and Mickey Raphael on harmonica.

Like its predecessor, Asleep at the Wheel failed to register on any national or international record charts. However, the band did register on the US Billboard Hot Country Songs chart for the first time, when second single "Choo Choo Ch'Boogie" (originally recorded by the Tympany Five) registered at number 69 in December 1974. Critical reviews of the album were generally positive, with commentators praising the breadth of musical styles on the record and its place within Western swing.

== Background ==
After being dropped by United Artists, Asleep at the Wheel signed a deal with Epic Records in May 1974. For the recording of their first album on the label, the band wanted to work again with Tommy Allsup, who produced their 1973 debut Comin' Right at Ya; however, Don Ellis, head of Epic at the time, assigned Norris "Norro" Wilson to the project. Sessions took place in Nashville, Tennessee again, this time at Columbia Studio B (the "Quonset hut studio"). Speaking about the recording process, frontman Ray Benson recalled that Wilson "let us do what we wanted", describing it as "a good experience". The album was released in September 1974.

The Asleep at the Wheel album cover features a photograph of the seven-piece band in front of a vintage 1938 Cadillac, which was taken in Austin, Texas shortly after the band relocated there from Oakland, California. The album was the band's first to feature bassist Tony Garnier, who replaced Gene Dobkin before recording began. It was also the only album to feature the group's first full-time fiddler Richard "Corky" Casanova, who joined for the recording and was credited as an official member on the album sleeve. Two tracks from Asleep at the Wheel were issued as singles in 1974: "You and Me Instead" and "Choo Choo Ch'Boogie".

== Reception ==
Professional ratings
Review scores
Source	Rating
AllMusic	3.5/5 stars
Christgau's Record Guide	B
Tom Hull – on the Web	B+
DownBeat	4/5 stars

Critical response to Asleep at the Wheel was generally positive. In an uncredited review, Cash Box magazine credited the band for the "gaining momentum" of progressive country, stating: "The group has gained considerable repute for their live act and their first album for Epic marks a worthy label debut as these seven dyed-in-the-wool country buffs confidently rip their way through numbers like "Choo Choo Ch'Boogie," "I'm Gonna Be a Wheel Someday," and "Bloodshot Eyes.""

In a retrospective review for website AllMusic, James Allen gave Asleep at the Wheel three and a half out of five stars, praising the "multitude of styles" present on the record including Western swing, jazz and honky-tonk. Music critic Robert Christgau gave the album a B rating, lower than the A− awarded to Comin' Right at Ya, comparing it to the style of Bob Wills. Cash Box praised "You and Me Instead" as "sweet", and hailed "Choo Choo Ch'Boogie" as "an infectious shuffle".

== Track listing ==
No.	Title	Writer(s)	Length
1.	"Choo Choo Ch'Boogie" (originally recorded by Louis Jordan and His Tympany Five)	Milt Gabler; Vaughn Horton; Denver Darling	3:17
2.	"You and Me Instead"	Kevin Farrell	3:25
3.	"Jumpin' at the Woodside" (originally recorded by the Count Basie Orchestra)	Count Basie	3:51
4.	"Last Letter" (originally recorded by Rex Griffin)	Rex Griffin	5:31
5.	"Don't Ask Me Why (I'm Going to Texas)"	Ray Benson; LeRoy Preston; Farrell	2:52
6.	"The Kind of Love I Can't Forget" (originally recorded by Bob Wills and His Texas Playboys)	Jesse Ashlock	3:14
7.	"I'm Gonna Be a Wheel Someday" (originally recorded by Bobby Mitchell and the Toppers)	Roy Hayes	2:00
8.	"Our Names Aren't Mentioned (Together Anymore)"	Preston	3:59
9.	"Miss Molly" (originally recorded by Bob Wills and His Texas Playboys)	Cindy Walker	2:46
10.	"Blood-Shot Eyes" (originally recorded by Hank Penny)	Hank Penny; Ruth Hall	3:48
11.	"Dead Man"	Preston	3:23
Total length:			38:06

== Personnel ==
Asleep at the Wheel

- Ray Benson – lead guitar, vocals (lead on tracks 1, 2, 5 and 9; backing on tracks 9 and 11)
- Chris O'Connell – rhythm guitar, vocals (lead on tracks 4 and 6; co-lead on track 8; backing on tracks 1, 9 and 11)
- LeRoy Preston – drums, vocals (lead on tracks 7, 10 and 11; co-lead on track 8; backing on track 1)
- Lucky Oceans – pedal and lap steel guitars
- Tony Garnier – upright and electric basses
- Floyd Domino – piano
- Richard "Corky" Casanova – fiddle

Guest musicians

- Johnny Gimble – fiddle (tracks 3–7, 9 and 11), backing vocals (tracks 9 and 11), rhythm guitar (track 8)
- Bill Joor – trumpet (tracks 1–3, 5, 9 and 10)
- Andy Stein – saxophone (tracks 1, 3 and 10), fiddle (track 2)
- Lisa Silver – fiddle (tracks 2, 4 and 8)
- Mickey Raphael – harmonica (tracks 5 and 8)
- Bucky Meadows – rhythm guitar (tracks 6 and 7)
- Teddy Irwin – rhythm guitar (track 4)
- Larry Black – rhythm guitar (track 7)
- Bobby Black – pedal steel guitar (track 7)
- Buddy Spicher – fiddle (track 8)

Additional personnel

- Norro Wilson – production
- Lou Bradley – engineering
- Bill Barnes – design, photography, typography
- Phyllis Cortese – additional artwork
