= Roly Poly (Bob Wills song) =

1946 song by Fred Rose

Single by Bob Wills and His Texas Playboys
- B-side: "New Spanish Two Step"
- Published: April 11, 1946 Milene Music
- Released: April 1946
- Recorded: January 26, 1945
- Studio: CBS Studio at Radio Station KNX, Hollywood, California
- Genre: Western swing
- Label: Columbia 36966
- Songwriter: Fred Rose

Bob Wills and His Texas Playboys singles chronology
"White Cross on Okinawa" (1945)	"Roly Poly" (1946)	"Stay A Little Longer" (1946)

"Roly Poly" is a Western swing song written by Fred Rose in 1946, and first recorded by Bob Wills and His Texas Playboys the same year, staying on the charts for 18 weeks and reaching number 3 on the charts.

The song has been recorded by many Western swing bands since. Notable renditions have been recorded by fellow Texans, country crooners Jim Reeves and Ray Price. Asleep at the Wheel featuring The Chicks covered the song in 2000. The version was not a single, but charted as an album cut peaking at number 65. The Little Willies covered the song on their 2006 self-titled album.

Chuck Berry's "Roly Poly" is a different song, as is the 1952 Ray Charles/Rufus Beacham Orchestra instrumental "Roly Poly" (which may not even be Ray Charles).
