= Choo Choo Ch'Boogie =

1946 song

"Choo Choo Ch'Boogie" is a popular song written by Vaughn Horton, Denver Darling, and Milt Gabler.

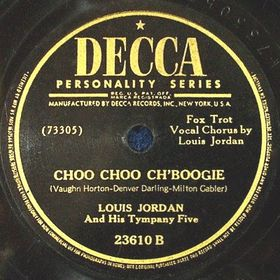
Choo Choo Ch'Boogie

The song was recorded in January 1946 by Louis Jordan & His Tympany Five and released by Decca Records. It topped the R&B charts for 18 weeks from August 1946, a record equalled by only one other hit, "The Honeydripper." The record was one of Jordan's biggest hits with both black and white audiences, peaking at number seven on the national chart and provided an important link between blues and country music, foreshadowing the development of "rock and roll" a few years later.

== History and background ==
Although "Choo Choo Ch'Boogie" is now seen as epitomising the style known as jump blues, it was written by white songwriters whose background was in country and western music. The song is credited to Darling, Horton and Gabler. Denver Darling (1909–1981) was a "hillbilly" guitarist and songwriter, as was his occasional songwriting partner Vaughn Horton (1911–1988). Darling and Horton had recently contributed "Don't Hang Around Me Anymore" to Gene Autry, a hit for him in 1945. Horton's other writing successes included "Mockin' Bird Hill", "Sugar-Foot Rag" and an updated version of Jimmie Rodgers' "Muleskinner's Blues." The third credited songwriter was Milt Gabler (1911–2001), then the vice-president of Decca Records and Louis Jordan's record producer. A few years later, still at Decca, Gabler was also responsible for producing Bill Haley's epoch-defining "Rock Around The Clock" (and Haley, in turn, recorded a version of "Choo Choo Ch'Boogie" for his album, Rock 'n' Roll Stage Show).

The song summed up the feelings of excitement followed by disillusionment felt by many who were returning from serving in the Second World War:

You reach your destination, but alas and alack!
You need some compensation to get back in the black
You take your morning paper from the top of the stack
And read the situations from the front to the back
The only job that's open needs a man with a knack
So put it right back in the rack, Jack!

== Renditions by other artists ==
In 1974, the American country swing group Asleep at the Wheel recorded the song for their second album, the self-titled Asleep at the Wheel. It was also released as a single and became their first song to appear on the Billboard Hot Country Songs chart. In a review for AllMusic, James Allen described their rendition as a "twanged-up version of the old Louis Jordan song [that made] country fans start to stand up and take notice of these scruffy but sincere traditionalists".
