= Miles and Miles of Texas =

Single by Asleep at the Wheel

from the album Wheelin' and Dealin'
- B-side: "Blues for Dixie"
- Released: December 1976 (U.S.)
- Recorded: 1976
- Genre: Country
- Length: 3:03
- Label: Capitol Nashville
- Songwriters: T. Camfield, D. Johnson
- Producer: Tommy Allsup

Asleep at the Wheel singles chronology
"Nothin' Takes the Place of You" (1976)	"Miles and Miles of Texas" (1976)	"Trouble with Lovin' Today" (1977)

"Miles and Miles of Texas" is a song originally recorded by Jim McGraw And The Western Sundowners in 1961. It was used as the B-side of their single, "Crazy Dreams."

The song is a ballad about a man who was born and raised in Louisiana but leaves home, crosses the Red River and explores Texas. He finds love in "Cowtown," becomes a rodeo cowboy, and decides to make the state his permanent home.

== Asleep at the Wheel cover ==
Asleep at the Wheel recorded "Miles and Miles of Texas" in 1976. It was the second of three singles released from their 1976 LP, Wheelin' and Dealin'.

The song reached No. 38 on the U.S. Billboard Country chart during the winter of 1977.

=== Chart history ===
Chart (1977)	Peak position
US Billboard Country	38

== Cover versions ==
Red Steagall covered "Miles and Miles of Texas" on his 1976 LP Texas Red.
