= The House of Blue Lights (song) =

1946 song by Freddie Slack and Ella Mae Morse

Single by Freddie Slack with Ella Mae Morse
- B-side: "Hey Mr. Postman"
- Released: May 1946
- Genre: Boogie woogie
- Length: 2:51
- Label: Capitol
- Songwriter(s): Don Raye, Freddie Slack

"The House of Blue Lights" is a boogie woogie-style popular song written by Don Raye and Freddie Slack. Published in 1946, it was first recorded by Slack with singer Ella Mae Morse and Raye.

The song's intro includes a "hipster"-style spoken exchange:

- "Well, whatcha say, baby? You look ready as Mr. Freddy this black. How 'bout you and me goin' spinnin' at the track?"
- "What's that, homie? If you think I'm goin' dancin' on a dime, your clock is tickin' on the wrong time."
- "Well, what's your pleasure, treasure? You call the plays, I'll dig the ways."
- "Hey daddy-o, I'm not so crude as to drop my mood on a square from way back ..."

A single review in Billboard magazine included similar hipster parlance:

For back-room boogie with a mellow eight-to-the-bar kick, la [sic] Moore teams her tobacco pipes to the Black rhythm wing, giving big-time treatment to a small-time tune. Riding a solid rail, chirp chants it out with a contagious lilt. Dialog patter between Miss Moore and the tune's cleffer, Don Raye, is clever but takes up too much surface. "Postman" is typical B-side stuff.

The single reached number eight on the Hot 100 singles chart.

== Other recordings ==
"The House of Blue Lights" has been recorded by a variety of musical artists.

- A version by the Andrews Sisters, also released in 1946, reached number 15.
- In 1955, a recording by Chuck Miller for Mercury Records reached number nine on the Billboard Popular Records chart.
- A cover by Asleep at the Wheel peaked at number 17 on the Billboard Hot Country Singles chart in 1987.
- The Harvard Krokodiloes have long used the song as their traditional opening number at all their concerts.
