= Milt Gabler =

American record producer (1911–2001)

- Born: Milton Gabler; May 20, 1911; Harlem, New York
- Died: July 20, 2001 (aged 90); Manhattan, New York
- Other names: Roy Carroll, Jimmy Brewster, Roy Ilene
- Family: Billy Crystal (nephew)
- Awards: Member of the Rock and Roll Hall of Fame
- Musical career
- Occupations: Record producer, songwriter
- Label: Commodore Records

Milton Gabler (May 20, 1911 – July 20, 2001) was an American record producer, responsible for many innovations in the recording industry of the 20th century. These included being the first person to deal in record reissues, the first to sell records by mail order, and the first to credit all the musicians on the recordings.

He was also a successful songwriter, writing the lyrics for a number of standards, including "In a Mellow Tone," "Danke Schoen," and "L-O-V-E."

== Early life ==
Gabler was born to a Jewish family in Harlem, New York, the son of Susie (née Kasindorf) and Julius Gabler. His father was an Austrian Jewish immigrant from Vienna, and his mother's family were Jewish immigrants from Russia, including Rostov. His sister, Helen, was married to Billy Crystal's father, and was therefore Crystal's uncle. At 15, he began working in his father's business, a hardware store located on East 42nd Street in New York City. The store eventually sold Milt Gabler's Commodore Records and was transformed into the Commodore Music Shop which moved to 52nd Street. It was a family business for several years.

== Career ==
=== 1930s ===
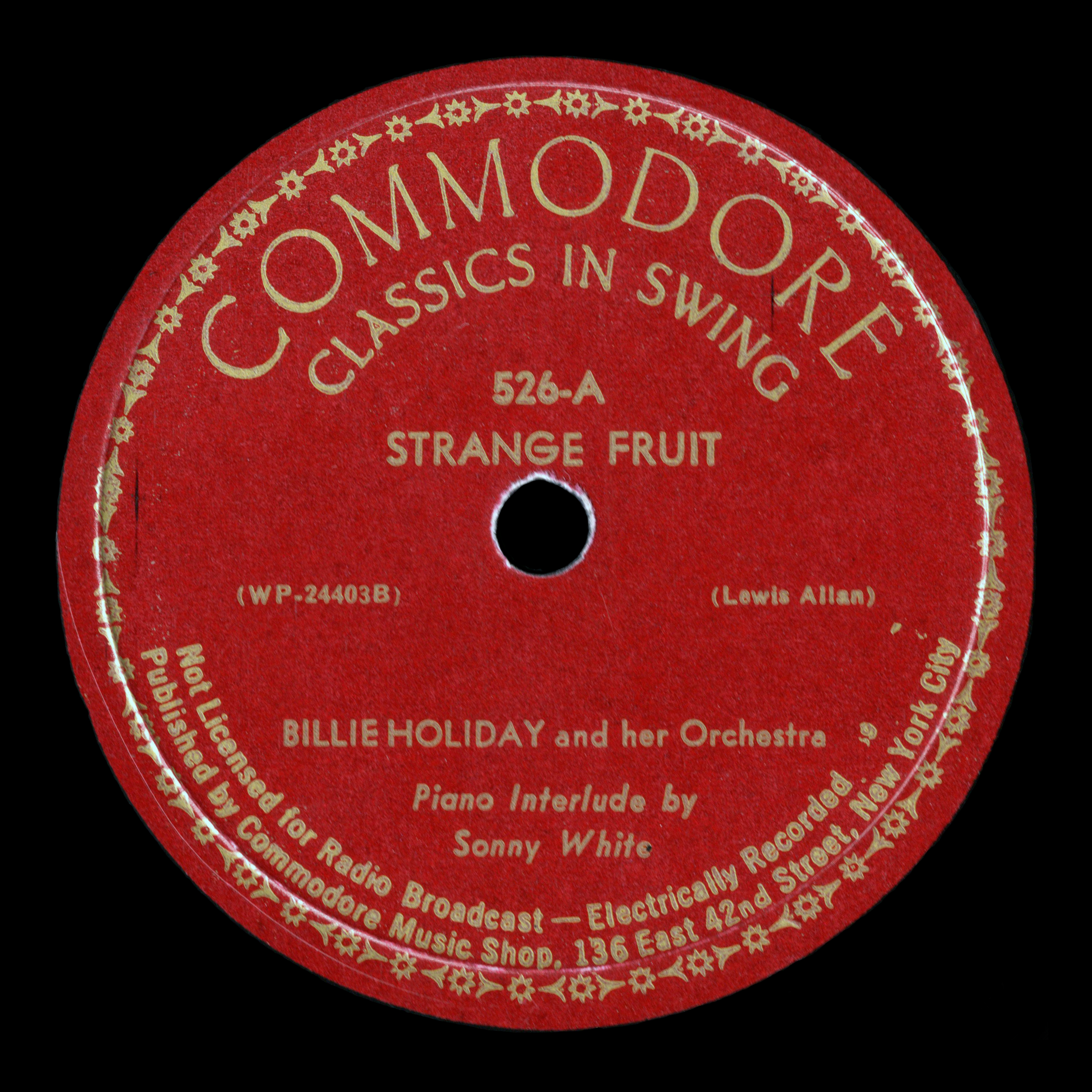
Commodore Records label for Billie Holiday's "Strange Fruit" (1939), named Best Song of the Century by Time magazine

By the mid-1930s, Gabler renamed the business the Commodore Music Shop, and it became a focal point for jazz fans and musicians alike. In 1933, Gabler began buying up unwanted copies of recordings from the record companies and resold them, making him the first person to deal in reissues, the first to sell records by mail order, and also the first to credit all the musicians on the recordings.

Gabler founded a specialty label UHCA (United Hot Clubs of America) around 1935 to reissue selected 78 r.p.m. sides previously released by other companies. He was able to secure the rights to many important jazz records including the 1931 Joe Venuti-Eddie Lang all star session (from ARC), Bessie Smith's final session (from OKeh), sides by Frank Trumbauer, Bix Beiderbecke, and Miff Mole (also from OKeh). These reissues were from the original 78 stampers and were instrumental in spreading the concept of collecting classic performances from the past. Paramount and Gennett sides were dubbed from clean copies and issued on UHCA.

In 1937, he opened a new store on 52nd Street, and set up a series of jam sessions in a neighboring club, Jimmy Ryan's. Some of these he began recording, setting up his own record label, Commodore Records. His role as a music producer soon superseded his other activities and he recorded many of the leading jazz artists of the day. One regular customer, Billie Holiday, found her record company, Columbia, resisting her appeals to release the song "Strange Fruit", so she offered the song to Gabler. After getting the necessary permission, he released her recording on Commodore in 1939, boosting her career and issuing what, 60 years on, Time magazine named 'Best Song of the Century'.

=== 1940s ===
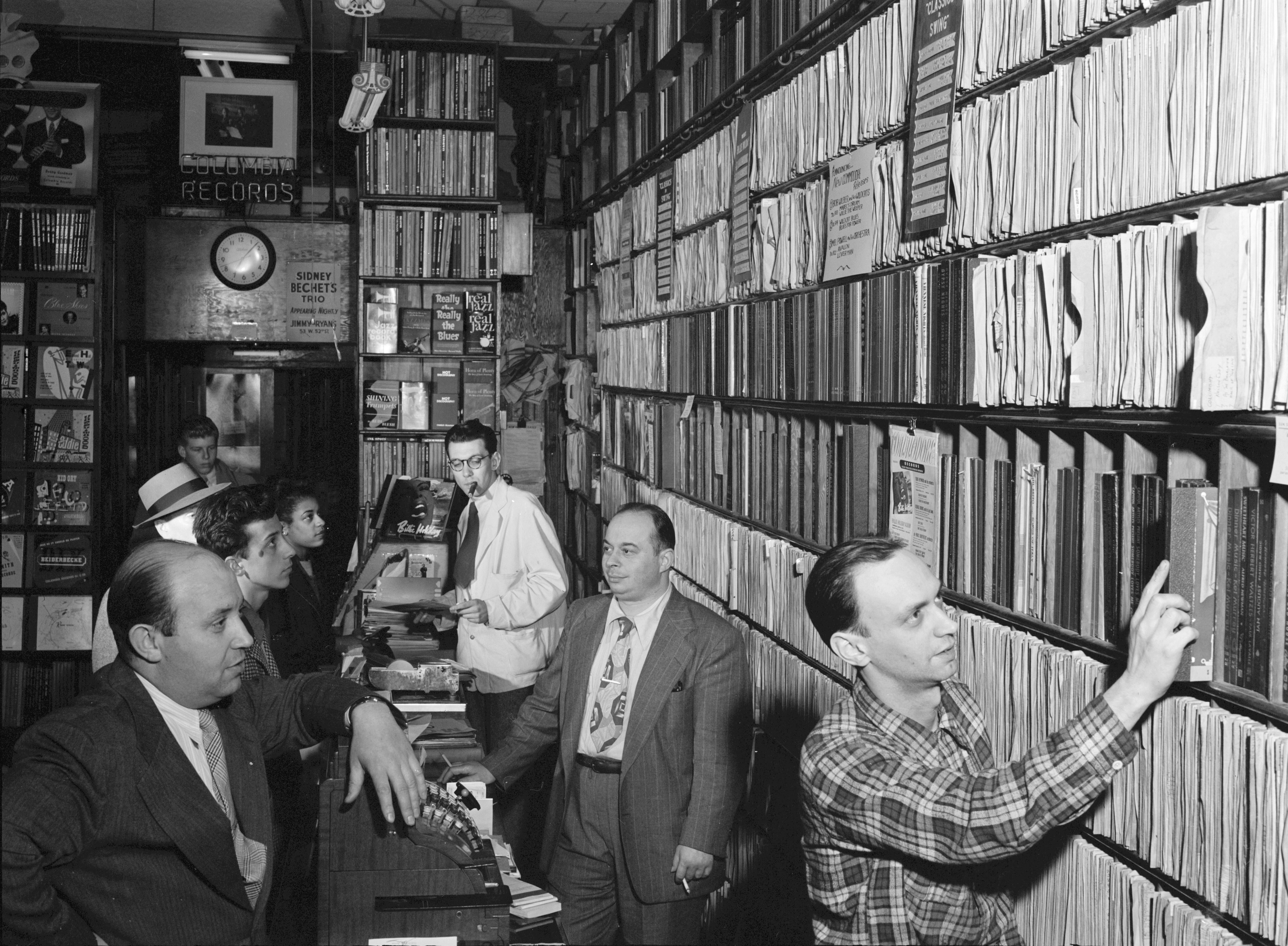
Milt Gabler (left) with Herbie Hill, Lou Blum and Jack Crystal at the Commodore Music Shop (1947)

The success of Commodore Records led to an offer to join a major record label. Gabler was recruited to work for Decca Records in 1941, and left his brother-in-law Jack Crystal (father of Billy Crystal) to run Commodore. Gabler was soon working with many of the biggest stars of the 1940s, producing a series of hits including Lionel Hampton's "Flying Home", Billie Holiday's "Lover Man" and the Andrews Sisters' "Rum and Coca-Cola", as well as being the first to bring Louis Armstrong and Ella Fitzgerald together on record.

Placed in charge of Decca's subsidiary label Coral, he expanded his musical scope, producing hits for country singer Red Foley, the left-leaning folk group the Weavers, Peggy Lee, the Ink Spots, and Sammy Davis Jr. In 1946, he produced and co-wrote Louis Jordan's breakthrough single, "Choo Choo Ch'Boogie". Gabler was also the producer (but not the writer) of Jordan's exceptionally successful hit record, "Saturday Night Fish Fry", which held the Number 1 spot on the R&B charts for 12 weeks.

=== 1950s and 1960s ===
Gabler signed rockabilly act pioneering rock and roll sensation Bill Haley and His Comets to Decca Records. He produced their initial recording session in April 1954, much of which was spent cutting a song which the company thought the more likely hit of the two due to be recorded that day. Their efforts on "13 Women" left only ten minutes for the second song, which Gabler recorded with an unusually high sound level after the briefest of sound checks. "Rock Around The Clock" was cut in two takes and changed the face of popular music. Gabler later commented: "All the tricks I used with Louis Jordan, I used with Bill Haley. The only difference was the way we did the rhythm. On Jordan, we used a perfectly balanced rhythm section from the swing era ... but Bill had the heavy backbeat."

Commodore Records closed in 1959. Bob Shad's Mainstream Records issued a series of LP reissues of Commodore material in the early 1960s, keeping most of these recordings available. However, through the late 1950s and 1960s, Gabler continued to guide the direction of Decca, writing songs and producing hit singles including Brenda Lee's "I'm Sorry" and albums including Jesus Christ Superstar. Gabler also continued to produce all of the Comets' recordings for Decca until they left the label in 1959.

Gabler also produced all studio albums in Hamburg for Bert Kaempfert and his Orchestra, from 1960 to the latter's death in June 1980. Gabler wrote many lyrics for Kaempfert songs, such as "L-O-V-E", a hit for Nat King Cole, and "Danke Schoen".

=== 1970s ===
Gabler retired from the front line of business activity when MCA consolidated Decca with its other labels and moved the merged MCA Records to Universal City, California in 1971, but continued to produce reissues and to collect recognition from the recording industry he helped shape. He was asked to return to MCA Records in 1973 to supervise the reissue of MCA's massive back catalogue.

== Personal life ==
Gabler died July 20, 2001, aged 90, at the Jewish Home and Hospital in Manhattan. The New York Times reported that the only photo at his bedside was that of Billie Holiday.

== Accolades ==
In 1991, Gabler received the Grammy Trustees Award from The Recording Academy, for his significant contributions to the field of recording.

In 1993, Gabler was inducted into the Rock and Roll Hall of Fame by his nephew, the comedian and actor Billy Crystal. In 2005, Crystal produced a documentary and CD release, both entitled The Milt Gabler Story, in tribute.
