= Asleep at the Wheel =

American band

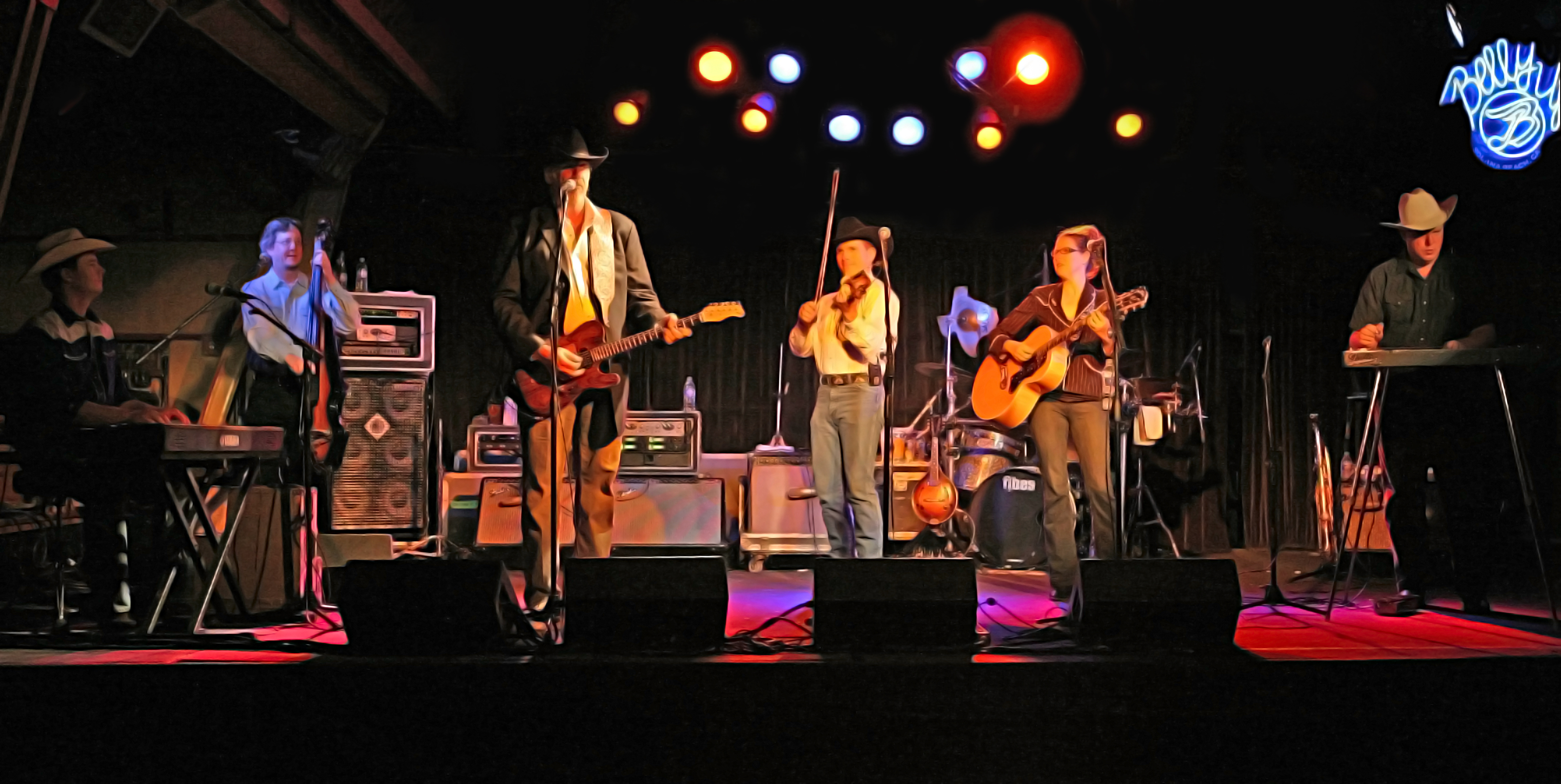
- Asleep at the Wheel performing in San Diego, California

Background information
- Origin: Paw Paw, West Virginia, U.S.
- Genres: Country; progressive country; rockabilly; Western swing
- Years active: 1970–present
- Labels: Bismeaux; DreamWorks; Capitol Nashville; Arista; Epic; MCA Nashville; Shout! Factory; Thirty Tigers
- Members: Ray Benson; Jason Baczyński; Dennis Ludiker; Connor Forsyth; Josh Hoag; Flavio Pasquetto; Nick Brown
- Past members: See former members
- Website: asleepatthewheel.com

Asleep at the Wheel is an American Western swing music group that was formed in Paw Paw, West Virginia, in 1970, and is based in Austin, Texas. The band has won nine Grammy Awards, released over 20 albums, appeared in multiple films, toured widely in America and Europe, and charted more than 21 singles on the Billboard country charts. Their highest-charting single, "The Letter That Johnny Walker Read", peaked at number 10 in 1975.

== History ==
=== Beginnings to Austin ===
In 1969, Ray Benson and Lucky Oceans (Reuben Gosfield), both natives of Philadelphia, Pennsylvania, co-founded Asleep at the Wheel in Paw Paw, West Virginia, and soon after they found themselves opening for Alice Cooper and Hot Tuna in Washington, DC. A year later, they moved to East Oakland, California, at the invitation of Commander Cody and His Lost Planet Airmen. After being mentioned in Rolling Stone magazine by Van Morrison, they landed a record deal with United Artists. In 1973, their debut album, Comin' Right at Ya, was released by United Artists. At the invitation of Willie Nelson, they left Oakland for Austin in 1974.

=== 1974–1979 ===
In 1974, Asleep at the Wheel released its self-titled second album, with a cover of Louis Jordan's "Choo Choo Ch'Boogie", which was the band's first single to hit the country charts. The following year had the release of Texas Gold, with the top-10 country hit single "The Letter That Johnny Walker Read". In addition, they played on PBS's Austin City Limits, where they have since performed a record-setting 10 times. In 1977, the band was voted Best Country Western Band by Rolling Stone and was awarded the Touring Band of the Year by the Academy of Country Music. They also went on tour with Emmylou Harris in Europe. The following year, they recorded a cover of Count Basie's song "One O'Clock Jump". Also in 1980, they appeared in the movie Roadie, along with Meat Loaf, Blondie, and Art Carney. By the end of the decade, the band recorded their first live album, Served Live, at the Austin Opera House.

=== 1980–1989 ===
The 1980s became a turbulent decade for the band. After moving to MCA, co-founder Lucky Oceans left, followed in September 1986 by Chris O'Connell due to her pregnancy. Asleep at the Wheel gathered a large amount of debt that required it to work on commercials and movie soundtracks. This band produced the soundtrack for the film Liar's Moon.

In 1985, the band released a virtually ignored self-titled album. By the late 1980s, Ray Benson had done some producing, allowing the band a second chance with Epic Records. In 1987, the band released 10, which won them their second Grammy for Best Country Instrumental, helping to launch their comeback. The album also had contributions from legendary fiddle player and onetime Texas Playboys member Johnny Gimble. The following year, the band released Western Standard Time, which won them another Grammy for Best Country Instrumental. The late 1980s also had the growth of Jann Browne as a solo vocalist in the group; in 1989 she would later embark on a solo career on Curb Records.

=== 1990–1999 ===
The band moved to Arista Records and released the album, Keepin' Me Up Nights. Soon after, the band had turnover. Among its new members was former solo singer Rosie Flores, who joined in 1997. In 1991, Ray Benson directed the music and co-starred in the movie Wild Texas Wind with Dolly Parton. In honor of the 66th anniversary of Route 66, the band launched the Route 66 Tour. In 1993, the band released an instant hit with several guest musicians, A Tribute to the Music of Bob Wills and the Texas Playboys, to much critical acclaim. Two years later, the band celebrated their 25th anniversary by releasing The Wheel Keeps on Rollin. In 1999, the band and DreamWorks released Ride with Bob, as their second tribute album to Bob Wills. This album also enjoyed immediate success and garnered the band two Grammy wins, one for Best Country Instrumental, and the other for Best Package Design.

According to Rolling Stone magazine, Ray Benson "didn't just enlist the obvious Wills fans" in this tribute album to Bob Wills like Merle Haggard, Willie Nelson, and Lyle Lovett. He also brought in some of country's young lions the Dixie Chicks, Tim McGraw, and Lee Ann Womack, some pop stars", including Shawn Colvin, the Squirrel Nut Zippers, and fellow country preservationists such as Dwight Yoakam.

=== 2000–present ===
In 2000, the Dixie Chicks were nominated for an award for Vocal Event of the Year for "Roly Poly" with Asleep at the Wheel from the Country Music Association. That same year, the band toured with Bob Dylan and George Strait. Benson recorded a tribute to Wills and Texas swing music, including Dwight Yoakam, Vince Gill, Merle Haggard, the Dixie Chicks, and Willie Nelson. They were scheduled to play at the White House on the fateful September 11, 2001. In 2003, the band released Live at Billy Bob's Texas, and by the end of the decade, the band had released two more albums: Reinventing the Wheel, an entirely new set of songs, including a collaboration with The Blind Boys of Alabama, and a two-disc set Kings of Texas Swing. In 2007, their second Christmas album was released, Santa Loves to Boogie.

Asleep at the Wheel received six Austin Music Awards for their efforts in 2007, including Band of the Year, Songwriter of the Year (Benson), Country Band of the Year, Record Producer of the Year (Benson), Male Vocals of the Year (Benson), and Acoustic Guitar Player of the Year (McQueen).

In 2023, Katie Shore (vocals/fiddle) left the band for a solo career, but she still continues to sit in with the group on a semiregular basis.

== Members ==
Current members

- Ray Benson – lead vocals, lead guitar (1970–present)
- Ian Stewart - Fiddle, vocals (Late 2024 - present)
- Dennis Ludiker – fiddle, mandolin, backing vocals (2016–present)
- Connor Forsyth – piano, organ, accordion, backing vocals (2016–present)
- Josh Hoag – bass (2017–present)
- Curtis Clogston – steel guitars (2020–present)
- Nick Brown – saxophone (Late 2025–present)
- Russ Patterson - drums (2023–present)

== Discography ==
- Comin' Right at Ya (1973)
- Asleep at the Wheel (1974)
- Texas Gold (1975)
- Wheelin' and Dealin' (1976)
- The Wheel (1977)
- Collision Course (1978)
- Framed (1980)
- Pasture Prime (released as Asleep at the Wheel in the US) (1985)
- 10 (1987)
- Western Standard Time (1988)
- Keepin' Me Up Nights (1990)
- Tribute to the Music of Bob Wills and the Texas Playboys (1993)
- The Wheel Keeps on Rollin' (1995)
- Merry Texas Christmas, Y'all (1997)
- Ride with Bob: A Tribute to Bob Wills and the Texas Playboys (1999)
- The Very Best of Asleep at the Wheel (2001)
- Hang Up My Spurs (2002)
- Asleep at the Wheel Remembers the Alamo (2003)
- Reinventing the Wheel (2007)
- Santa Loves to Boogie (2007)
- Willie and the Wheel (2009) (with Willie Nelson)
- It's a Good Day (2010) (with Leon Rausch)
- Still the King: Celebrating the Music of Bob Wills and His Texas Playboys (2015)
- Lone Star Christmas Night (2016)
- New Routes (2018)
- Half a Hundred Years (2021)

== Awards and nominations ==
Asleep at the Wheel has won eight Grammy Awards out of 27 nominations. The band has also been nominated for 12 Country Music Association Awards. In 1977, they won the Academy of Country Music Award for Touring Band of the Year and have been nominated an additional nine times.

Awards
Preceded by Jason & the Scorchers	AMA Lifetime Achievement Award for Performing; 2009	Not Yet Awarded
