= Ray Benson =

American singer-songwriter

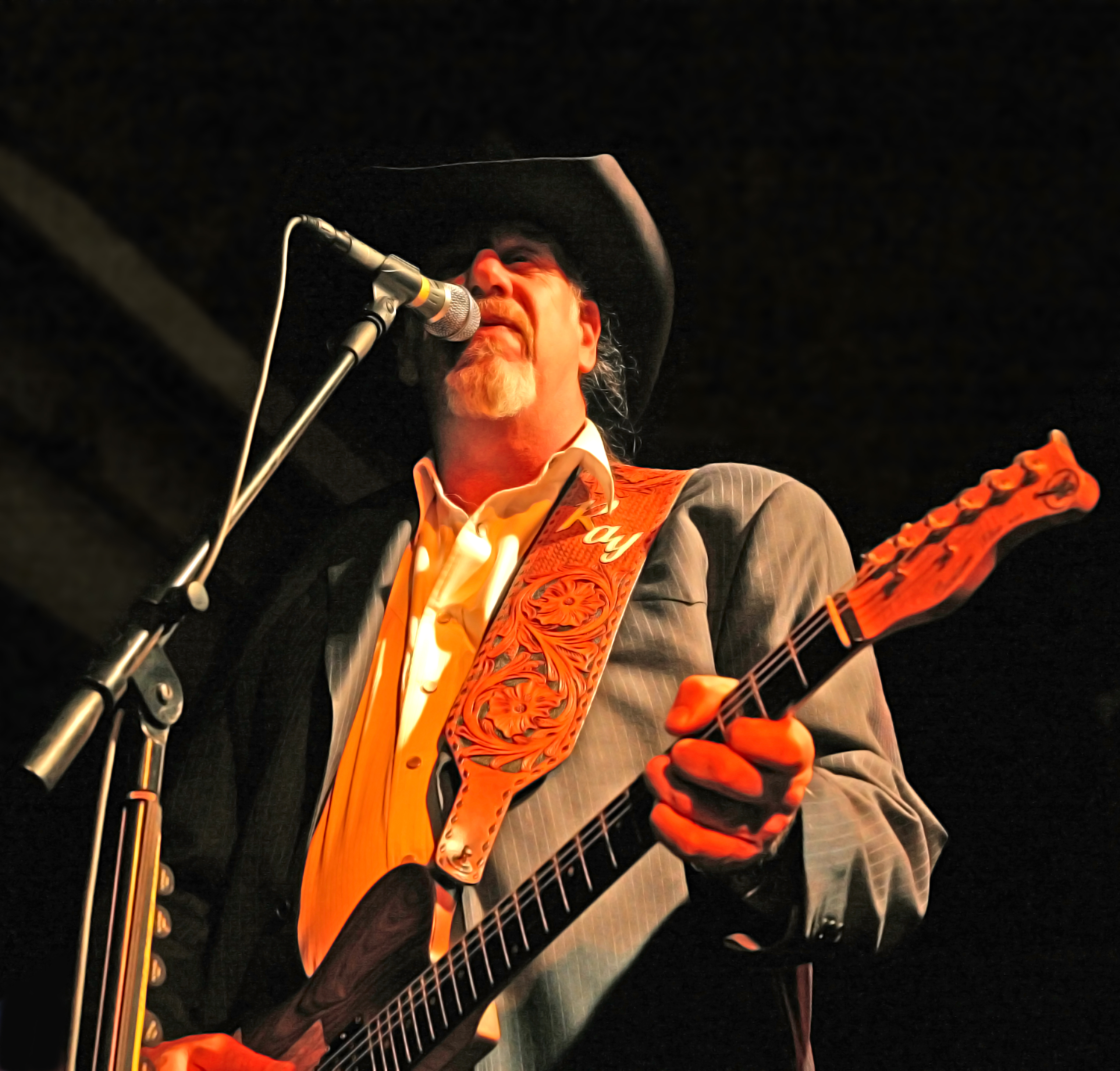
- Ray Benson performing in April 2008

Background information
- Birth name: Ray Benson Seifert
- Born: March 16, 1951 (age 74)
- Origin: Philadelphia, Pennsylvania, U.S.
- Genres: Western swing; country
- Occupations: Singer; songwriter; actor; voice actor; record producer
- Instruments: Vocals; guitar
- Years active: 1969–present
- Labels: Arista Nashville, Bismeaux
- Member of: Asleep at the Wheel
- Website: www.raybenson.com

Ray Benson Seifert (born March 16, 1951) is an American musician, actor, and voice actor who is the frontman of the Western swing band Asleep at the Wheel.

== Biography ==
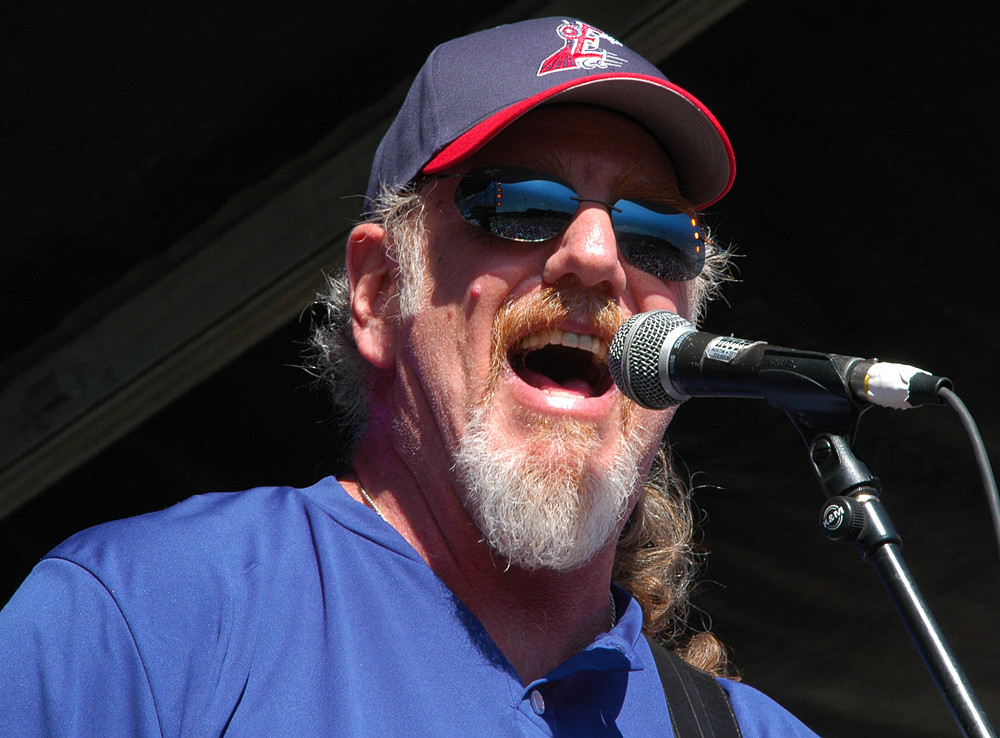
Ray Benson performing in April 2009

Benson was raised Jewish. In 1970, Benson, a native of Philadelphia, formed Asleep at the Wheel with friends Lucky Oceans and Leroy Preston in Paw Paw, West Virginia. They were soon joined by Gene Dobkin, a classmate of Benson's at Antioch College, and Chris O'Connell. The group relocated to Austin in 1973 after a suggestion from Willie Nelson. Since then, the group has released more than 20 albums and earned nine Grammy awards.

Benson released one solo single, "Four Scores and Seven Beers Ago", via Arista Nashville in 1991.

In addition to his work with Asleep at the Wheel, Benson is also a record producer whose credits include albums by Dale Watson, Suzy Bogguss, Aaron Watson, James Hand and Carolyn Wonderland; also single tracks for Willie Nelson, Aaron Neville, Brad Paisley, Pam Tillis, Trace Adkins, Merle Haggard, and Vince Gill.

In 2003, Benson released his first solo album entitled Beyond Time.

Benson is also a founding member of the Rhythm and Blues Foundation, which raises money to help aging R&B artists, and a member of the board of directors of the SIMS Foundation, which provides low-cost mental health services to Austin musicians and their families. He is also a trustee for the Texas chapter of National Academy of Recording Arts and Sciences, a board member of St Davids Community Health Foundation, and a board member and founding member of Health Alliance for Austin Musicians.

Ray Benson is the former host of the Texas Music Scene TV show. In an interview, Benson said that when he was on the board of directors for Austin City Limits, he urged them to start a spin-off show that focused on Texas bands because Austin City Limits had grown beyond its original scope to become an international show. Later, he had the opportunity to work with executive producer Tom Hoitsma to host the Texas Music Scene TV, which showcases Texas bands.

== A Ride with Bob ==
In the spring of 2005, Ray Benson and Asleep at the Wheel began the production of A Ride with Bob that follows the travels of legendary singer/songwriter Bob Wills. It includes the live performance of 15 of Wills’ best-known songs in a plot that interweaves Ray Benson’s present day with various stages in Wills’ storied career. The play continues to tour throughout the country.

== Awards ==
Benson has been presented numerous awards throughout his career. Most recently, the 16th Annual Midsouth Regional Emmy Award for the making of A Ride with Bob, an honorary junior member of the United States Secret Service, and the Darrel K. Royal Music Patron Award by the Texas Heritage Songwriters' Association. In 2007, the Austin Chronicle recognized Benson for Male Vocals, Band of the Year, Songwriter, Record Producer, and the Country Genre. Benson was inducted into the Austin Music Hall of Fame in 2002, was given the Texas Music Association Lifetime Achievement Award in 1996, and recognized as an outstanding producer by the National Academy of Recording Arts in 1988. He has also been given numerous citations of achievement by Broadcast Music, Inc. for his work in the country music field. Ray Benson has been one of the strongest names in country music for the last 40 years. He has earned nine Grammy awards in four different decades. On April 12, 2025, Ray Benson was inducted into the West Virginia Music Hall of Fame at the State Capitol's Cultural Center Theater in Charleston, West Virginia.

== Willie and the Wheel ==
In February 2009, Asleep at the Wheel and Willie Nelson released Willie and the Wheel, a western swing collaboration suggested by veteran producer Jerry Wexler. Nelson has a long-time interest in western swing and had toured with the band in 2007. Paul Shaffer and Vince Gill also perform on this album.

== Filmography ==
- Roadie (1980) ... Ray Benson
- Why Christmas Trees Aren't Perfect (1990) ... Sir Woodrow (voice)
- Never Leave Nevada (1990) ... Composer
- Wild Texas Wind (1991) ... Ray Benson

== Discography ==
=== Albums ===
Title	Album details
Beyond Time	Release date: June 24, 2003; Label: Audium/Koch Records
A Little Piece	Release date: January 21, 2014; Label: Bismeaux Records
Songs from a Stolen Spring (Compilation)	Release date: October 18, 2014; Label: Valley Entertainment/Kirkelig Kulturverksted

=== Singles ===
Year	Single	Peak positions
Year	Single	US Country
1991	"Four Scores and Seven Beers Ago"	67
