= List of Asleep at the Wheel members =

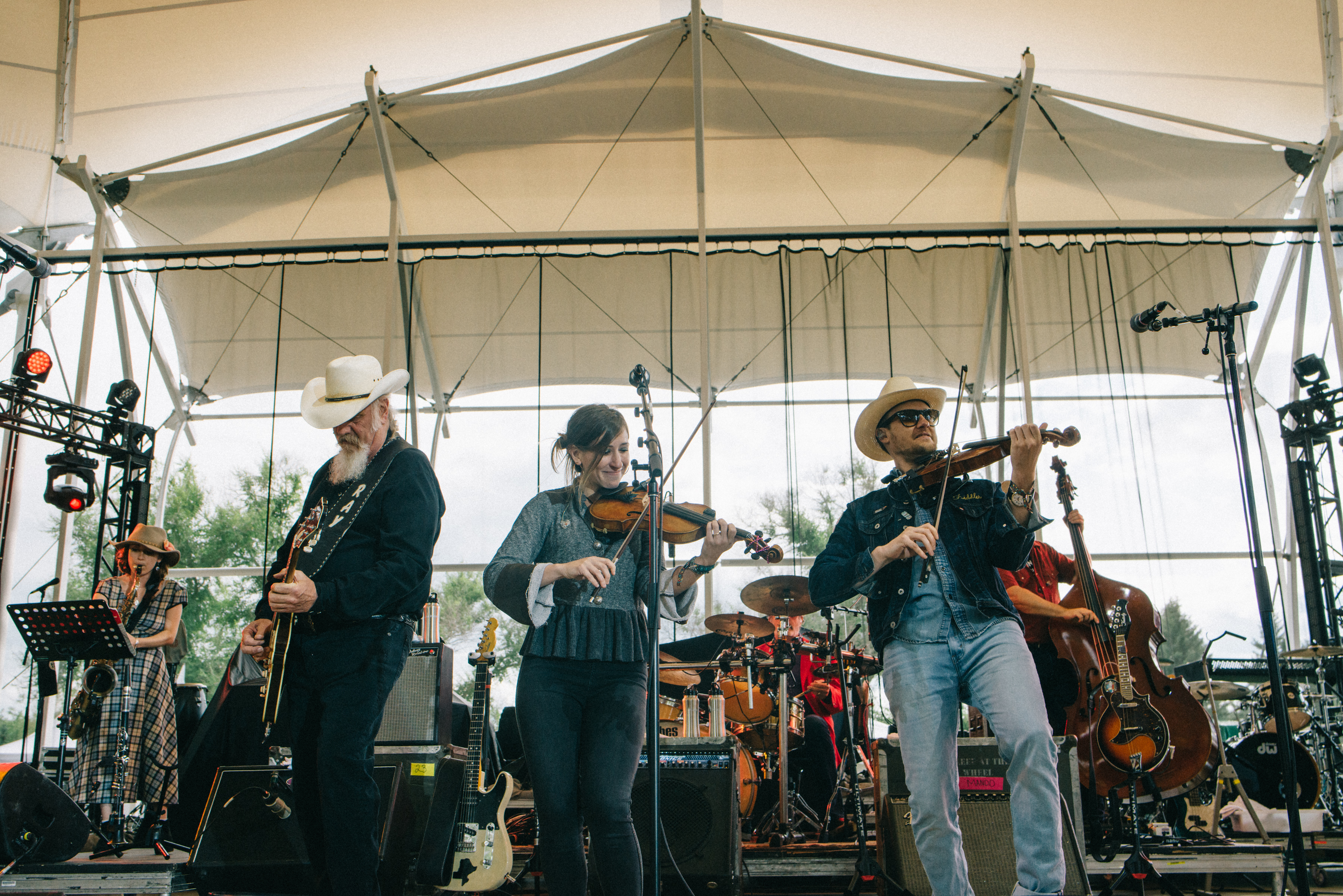
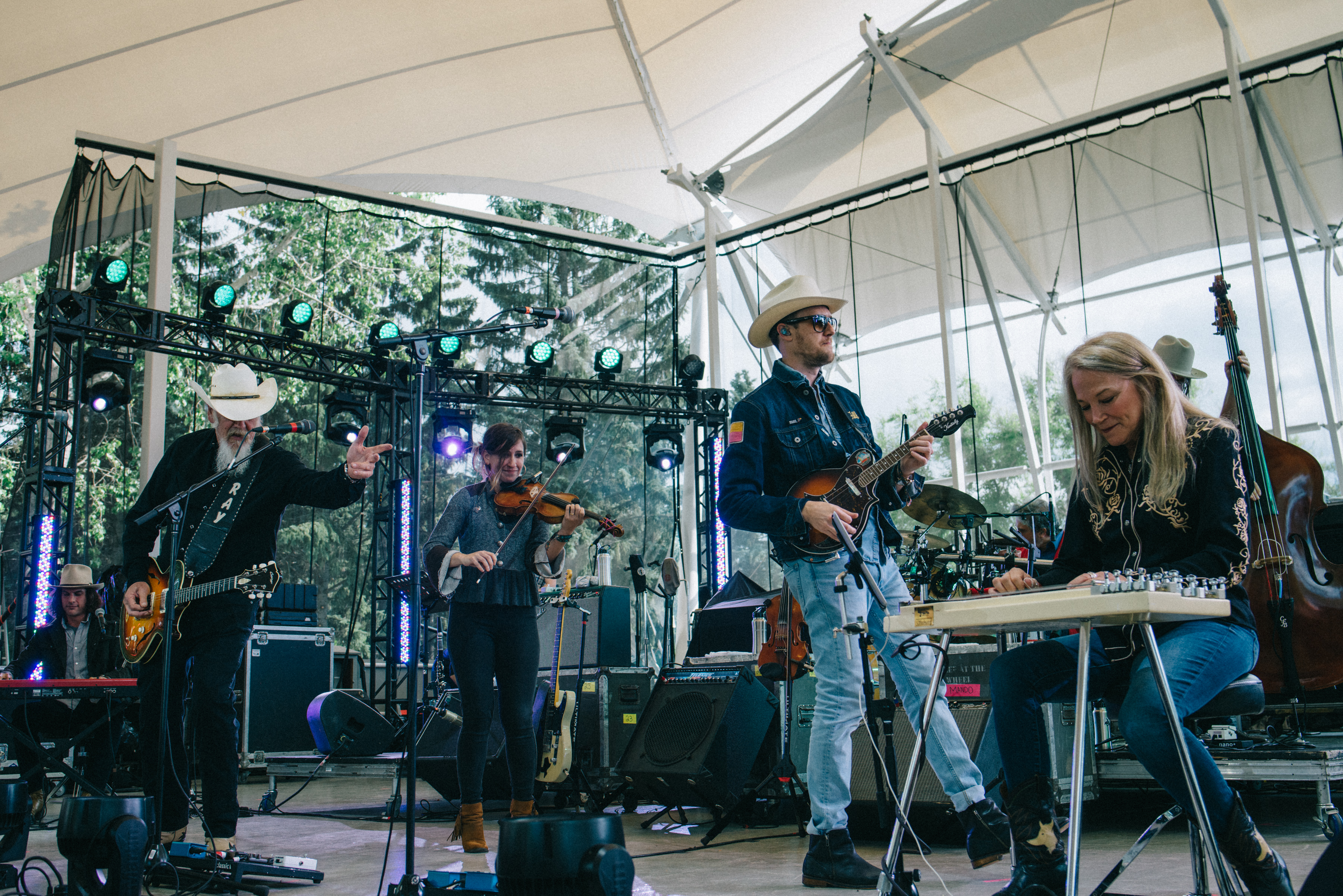
Asleep at the Wheel performing in 2019.

Asleep at the Wheel is an American country band based in Austin, Texas. Formed in Paw Paw, West Virginia in 1970, the group originally consisted of vocalist and guitarist Ray Benson, vocalist and drummer LeRoy Preston, steel guitarist Lucky Oceans, bassist Rob Silver, and pianist Danny Levin, who were joined later by bassist Gene Dobkin, and vocalist and guitarist Chris O'Connell. The band's current lineup includes Benson alongside fiddler and mandolinist Dennis Ludiker (since 2016), pianist and keyboardist Connor Forsyth (since 2016), bassist Josh Hoag (since 2017), steel guitarist Flavio Pasquetto (since 2019), drummer Jason Baczynski (since 2020), and saxophonist Nick Brown (since late 2025).

== History ==
=== 1970–1980 ===
Asleep at the Wheel (AATW) was originally formed in January 1970 in Paw Paw, West Virginia. The band's initial lineup featured lead vocalist and guitarist Ray Benson, second vocalist and drummer LeRoy Preston, pedal and lap steel guitarist Lucky Oceans (real name Reuben Gosfield), and pianist Danny Levin. By the time they made their live debut a few months after forming, the band included Gene Dobkin on upright and electric bass, replacing Richard Fitzhugh who left after he "kind of went nuts", according to Benson. By the end of the year the group had added two female backing vocalists, Chris O'Connell and Emily Paxton, although the latter had to leave after a few months due to "family matters". In August 1971, the band relocated to Oakland, California and Levin remained in West Virginia.

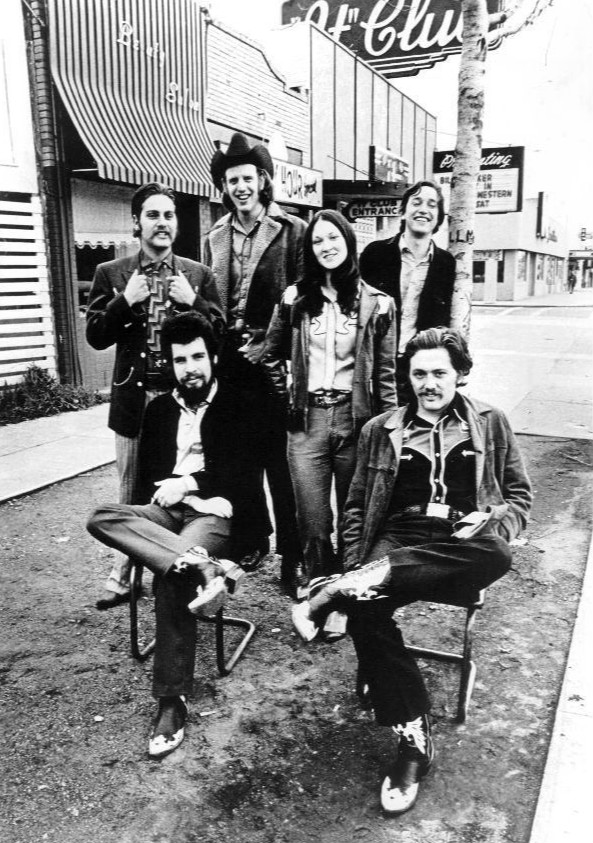
AATW reached its commercial peak in 1975, when "The Letter That Johnny Walker Read" reached the Billboard Hot Country Songs chart top ten.

After adding pianist Floyd Domino (real name Jim Haber) to the lineup in 1972, AATW signed with United Artists Records and issued its debut album Comin' Right at Ya the following year. In February 1974, the group moved to Austin, Texas. Dobkin was replaced by Tony Garnier, Richard Casanova joined on fiddle, and in the summer the group released its self-titled second album on Epic Records. The next year saw the release of Texas Gold on Capitol Records, featuring original pianist Levin returning on fiddle, new drummer Scott Hennige (Preston switched to rhythm guitar) and saxophonist Ed Vizard. For the 1976 album Wheelin' and Dealin', the group added second fiddler Bill Mabry and replaced Vizard with Link Davis Jr. Shortly after its release, Chris York replaced Hennige and Pat "Taco" Ryan joined on saxophone.

Two years and two more albums (The Wheel and Collision Course) for Capitol later, AATW suffered its first major lineup change in September 1978 when Preston, Domino and Mabry all left the band. Johnny Nicholas took over rhythm guitar and piano duties, and the band reduced to a nine-piece lineup. By December the group was an eight-piece following the departure of Davis, while Garnier and York had been replaced by Spencer Starnes and Fran Christina, respectively. After the band released its first live album Served Live, Starnes was replaced by Dean DeMerritt. Shortly thereafter, Lucky Oceans left the band to move to Australia with his family.

=== 1980–2000 ===
In early 1980, AATW added vocalist Maryann Price and replaced steel guitarist Lucky Oceans with Bobby Black. Later in the year, O'Connell took a temporary leave of absence from full-time touring, and was replaced by Brenda Burns. Several members left after a show on the final day of 1980, including Johnny Nicholas. The group returned in early 1981 with new members Dan Tyack on pedal steel guitar, Falkner Evans on piano, Billy Estes on drums and Paul Anastasio on fiddle. By the summer, Burns, Tyack, Estes and Pat "Taco" Ryan had been replaced by Jann Browne, Wally Murphy, Steve Schwelling and Michael Francis, respectively.

By summer 1982, the lineup of AATW featured Anastasio's brother Tom on bass and Roy McCrory on drums. Richard Hormachea replaced McCrory a few months later. Browne had left by 1983 as O'Connell returned full-time, and during 1984 Billy Cochran replaced Paul Anastasio. By early 1985, the band featured Junior Brown on lap steel guitar, Tim Alexander on piano, Mike Grammar on drums and Larry Franklin on fiddle. That year, the band issued Pasture Prime, its first album in five years, which featured contributions from several of the 1981–85 lineups. In 1986, O'Connell left AATW after becoming pregnant with her second child.

Later in 1986, AATW signed with Epic Records again and recorded 10, which saw the debut of steel guitarist John Ely, bassist David Dawson and drummer David Sanger. In summer 1988, Dawson was replaced by Jon Mitchell. Ricky Turpin took over from Franklin in 1991, and shortly after the release of Greatest Hits: Live & Kickin' the next year, Ely, Mitchell and Sanger were replaced by Cindy Cashdollar, David Miller and Tommy Beavers, respectively. Tribute to the Music of Bob Wills and the Texas Playboys followed in 1993, after which Barbara Lamb of Ranch Romance replaced Turpin and Sanger returned on drums. After the release of The Wheel Keeps on Rollin' in 1995, Lamb was replaced by Monty Gaylord. Jason Roberts (fiddle, mandolin) and Chris Booher (piano, fiddle) joined AATW the next year, followed by Rosie Flores (vocals, rhythm guitar) in April 1997. After Flores departed, the band issued Merry Texas Christmas, Y'all in 1997 and a second tribute album, Ride with Bob, in 1999.

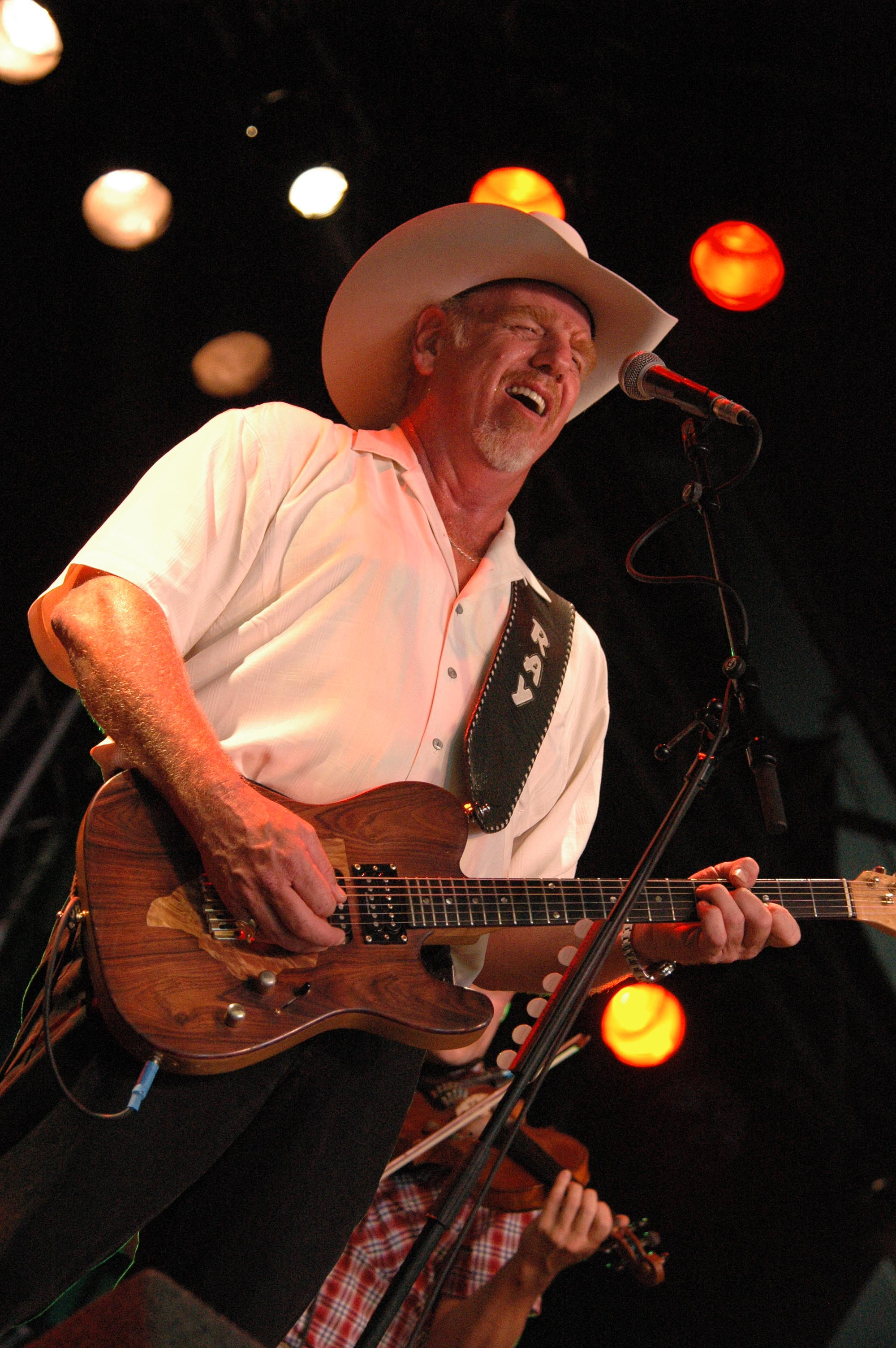
Vocalist and guitarist Ray Benson has remained the sole constant member of AATW since its formation.

=== 2000–2019 ===
By the spring of 2000, John Michael Whitby had taken over from Chris Booher on piano. After the release of The Very Best of Asleep at the Wheel in 2001, Cindy Cashdollar left to pursue other projects. She was replaced by Jim Murphy. Later in the year, long-term saxophonist Michael Francis also left, with Murphy taking over saxophone duties. In early 2003, Haydn Vitera joined to give the band a two-fiddler lineup for the first time since 1978, debuting on that year's Live at Billy Bob's Texas and Remembers the Alamo. Eddie Rivers replaced Murphy in June 2004. Just under a year later, Vitera left and Elizabeth McQueen joined as second vocalist and guitarist.

In late 2006, Walt Roberts joined on second fiddle, although less than a year later he had left again. Also in 2007, former pianist Floyd Domino returned to the band. The group collaborated with Willie Nelson on Willie and the Wheel in 2009, and later in the year Dan Walton took over from Domino. In January 2014, McQueen left to raise her children and was replaced by Katie Shore, who also played second fiddle. Jason Roberts left a few months later, at which point Shore became the primary fiddler in the group. Around the same time, pianist Emily Gimble (the granddaughter of fiddler Johnny Gimble) and saxophonist/clarinetist Jay Reynolds joined the band.

After the release of a third Bob Wills tribute album, Still the King, AATW became an eight-piece again with the addition of lead fiddler and mandolinist Dennis Ludiker in January 2016, followed by Connor Forsyth replacing Gimble in May. By 2017, Josh Hoag had also joined on bass, marking the end of David Earl Miller's 25-year tenure in the band. The band issued New Routes in 2018, its first album of new material since Reinventing the Wheel in 2006. In June 2019, Eddie Rivers retired and Jay Reynolds left; they were replaced temporarily by returning steel guitarist Cindy Cashdollar (and later Lucky Oceans) and saxophonist Chloe Feoranzo, respectively.

=== Since 2019 ===
In September 2019, Italian steel guitarist Flavio Pasquetto joined AATW as the full-time replacement for the retired Rivers. Late the following year, long-time drummer David Sanger was replaced by Jason Baczynski. Starting with the band's 50th anniversary shows in 2021, Joey Colarusso joined on saxophones. In late 2025, Colarusso was replaced by Nick Brown on saxophone and clarinet.

== Members ==
=== Current ===
Image	Name	Years active	Instruments	Release contributions
	Ray Benson	1970–present	lead and backing vocals; lead and rhythm guitars	all Asleep at the Wheel (AATW) releases
	Dennis Ludiker	2016–present	fiddle; mandolin; guitar; backing vocals	all AATW releases from Still the King (2015) onwards
	Connor Forsyth	2016–present	piano; organ; accordion; backing vocals	Lone Star Christmas Night (2016); New Routes (2018)
	Josh Hoag	2017–present	bass; rhythm guitar	New Routes (2018); Better Times (2021); Half a Hundred Years (2021)
	Flavio Pasquetto	2019–present	steel guitars	Better Times (2021)
	Jason Baczynski	2020–present	drums	Better Times (2021)
	Nick Brown	Late 2025–present	saxophones; clarinet	

=== Former ===
Image	Name	Years active	Instruments	Release contributions
	Lucky Oceans (Reuben Gosfield)	1970–1980; 2019 (touring)	steel guitars; occasional backing and lead vocals	all AATW releases from Comin' Right at Ya (1973) to Served Live (1979); Live at Ebbets Field 1973 (2004) (plus Tribute to the Music of Bob Wills and the Texas Playboys (1993), Back to the Future Now: Live at Arizona Charlie's, Las Vegas (1997), The Very Best of Asleep at the Wheel (2001) and Half a Hundred Years (2021) as a guest)
	LeRoy Preston	1970–1978	lead and backing vocals; drums (1970–75); rhythm guitar (1975–78)	all AATW releases from Comin' Right at Ya (1973) to Collision Course (1978); Live at Ebbets Field 1973 (2004) (plus Back to the Future Now: Live at Arizona Charlie's Las Vegas (1997) and Half a Hundred Years (2021) as a guest)
	Danny Levin	1970–1971; 1975–1981	piano; fiddle, mandolin, organ (1975–81)	all AATW releases from Texas Gold (1975) to Served Live (1979) (plus The Wheel Keeps on Rollin' (1995) and Half a Hundred Years (2021) as a guest)
	Gene Dobkin	1970–1974	bass; backing and occasional lead vocals	Comin' Right at Ya (1973); Live at Ebbets Field 1973 (2004)
	Chris O'Connell	1970–1986	lead and backing vocals; rhythm guitar; banjo	all AATW releases from Comin' Right at Ya (1973) to Pasture Prime (1985); Wide Awake! Live in Oklahoma (2003); Live at Ebbets Field 1973 (2004) (plus 10 (1987), Western Standard Time (1988), Tribute to the Music of Bob Wills and the Texas Playboys (1993), The Wheel Keeps on Rollin' (1995), Back to the Future Now: Live at Arizona Charlie's Las Vegas (1997), Ride with Bob (1999) and Half a Hundred Years (2021) as a guest)
	Emily Paxton	1970–1971	backing vocals	none – live performances only
	Floyd Domino (Jim Haber)	1972–1978; 2007–2009	piano; organ	all AATW releases from Comin' Right at Ya (1973) to Collision Course (1978), and from Reinventing the Wheel (2006) to Still the King (2015); Live at Ebbets Field 1973 (2004) (plus Pasture Prime (1985), Greatest Hits: Live & Kickin' (1992), Tribute to the Music of Bob Wills and the Texas Playboys (1993), Back to the Future Now: Live at Arizona Charlie's Las Vegas (1997), Merry Texas Christmas, Y'all (1997), Ride with Bob (1999), Hang Up My Spurs (2002) and Better Times (2021) as a guest)
	Tony Garnier	1974–1978	bass	all AATW releases from Asleep at the Wheel (1974) to Collision Course (1978) (plus Western Standard Time (1988), Back to the Future Now: Live at Arizona Charlie's Las Vegas (1997) and Half a Hundred Years (2021) as a guest)
	Richard "Corky" Casanova	1974–1975 (died 2014)	fiddle	Asleep at the Wheel (1974)
	Scott Hennige	1975–1976	drums	Texas Gold (1975); Wheelin' and Dealin' (1976) (plus Half a Hundred Years (2021) as a guest)
	Ed Vizard	1975–1976	saxophones; occasional backing and lead vocals	Texas Gold (1975) (plus Half a Hundred Years (2021) as a guest)
	Link Davis Jr.	1976–1978	saxophones; accordion; piano; fiddle; backing and occasional lead vocals	all AATW releases from Wheelin' and Dealin' (1976) to Served Live (1979)
	Bill Mabry	1976–1978	fiddle	Wheelin' and Dealin' (1976); The Wheel (1977); Collision Course (1978)
	Pat "Taco" Ryan	1976–1981	saxophones; clarinet; backing vocals	all AATW releases from The Wheel (1977) to Framed (1980)
	Johnny Nicholas	1978–1981	rhythm guitar; piano; harmonica; backing and occasional lead vocals	Served Live (1979) (plus Half a Hundred Years (2021) as a guest)
	Fran Christina	1978–1981	drums	Served Live (1979); Framed (1980)
	Spencer Starnes	1978–1979; 1981–1982	bass	Served Live (1979); Framed (1980); Pasture Prime (1985) (plus The Wheel Keeps on Rollin' (1995) and Half a Hundred Years (2021) as a guest)
	Dean DeMerritt	1979–1981	bass	Framed (1980)
	Maryann Price	1980–1982	lead and backing vocals	Framed (1980); Pasture Prime (1985)
	Bobby Black	1980–1981	pedal steel guitar	Framed (1980) (plus Asleep at the Wheel (1974) as a guest)
	Brenda Burns	1980–1981	lead and backing vocals	none – live performances only
	Falkner Evans	1981–1985	piano; organ	Pasture Prime (1985)
	Paul Anastasio	1981–1984	fiddle	Pasture Prime (1985)
	Billy Estes	1981	drums	Framed (1980)
	Dan Tyack	1981	pedal steel guitar	none – live performances only
	Michael Francis	1981–2001	saxophones; clarinet	all AATW releases from Pasture Prime (1985) to The Very Best of Asleep at the Wheel (2001); Live from Austin TX (2006) (plus Half a Hundred Years (2021) as a guest)
	Wally Murphy	1981–1985	pedal steel guitar	Pasture Prime (1985) (plus Half a Hundred Years (2021) as a guest)
	Jann Browne	1981–1983	lead and backing vocals	none – live performances only
	Steve Schwelling	1981–1982	drums	Pasture Prime (1985)
	Tom Anastasio	1982–1986	bass	Pasture Prime (1985); 10 (1987)
	Roy McCrory	1982	drums	none – live performances only
	Richard Hormachea	1982–1985	drums	Pasture Prime (1985) (plus Half a Hundred Years (2021) as a guest)
	Wes Starr	1984–1985; 2015 (touring)	drums	Asleep at The Wheel (1985)
	Billy Cochran	1984–1985	fiddle	none – live performances only
	"Professor" Tim Alexander	1985–1996; 2006 (touring) (died 2017)	piano; accordion; organ; backing vocals	all AATW releases from Pasture Prime (1985) to The Wheel Keeps on Rollin' (1995); Wide Awake! Live in Oklahoma (2003); Live from Austin, TX (2006); The Best of Asleep at the Wheel on the Road (2006) (plus Back to the Future Now: Live at Arizona Charlie's Las Vegas (1997) and Ride with Bob (1999) as a guest)
	Larry Franklin	1985–1991	fiddle; guitar; backing and occasional lead vocals	all AATW releases from Pasture Prime (1985) to Keepin' Me Up Nights (1990); Wide Awake! Live in Oklahoma (2003) (plus Tribute to the Music of Bob Wills and the Texas Playboys (1993), Ride with Bob (1999), Still the King (2015) and Half a Hundred Years (2021) as a guest)
	Mike Grammar	1985–1986	drums	Pasture Prime (1985)
	Jamieson "Junior" Brown	1985–1986	lap steel guitar	Pasture Prime (1985)
	David Sanger	1986–1992; 1995–2020	drums; percussion	all AATW releases from 10 (1987) onwards (except Wide Awake! Live in Oklahoma and Live at Ebbets Field 1973)
	John Ely	1986–1992	steel guitars	all AATW releases from 10 (1987) to Tribute to the Music of Bob Wills and the Texas Playboys (1993) (plus Half a Hundred Years (2021) as a guest)
	David Dawson	1986–1988	bass	10 (1987)
	Jon Mitchell	1988–1992	bass; backing vocals	Western Standard Time (1988); Keepin' Me Up Nights (1990); Greatest Hits: Live & Kickin' (1992)
	Ricky Turpin	1991–1994	fiddle; mandolin; backing vocals	Greatest Hits: Live & Kickin' (1992); Tribute to the Music of Bob Wills and the Texas Playboys (1993); Live from Austin, TX (2006)
	David Earl Miller	1992–2017	bass; backing vocals	all AATW releases from Tribute to the Music of Bob Wills and the Texas Playboys (1993) to Lone Star Christmas Night (2016) (except Wide Awake! Live in Oklahoma and Live at Ebbets Field 1973; plus Half a Hundred Years (2021) as a guest)
	Cindy Cashdollar	1992–2001; 2019 (touring)	steel and slide guitars	all AATW releases from Tribute to the Music of Bob Wills and the Texas Playboys (1993) to Hang Up My Spurs (2002) (plus Live at Billy Bob's Texas (2003), Live from Austin, TX (2006) and Half a Hundred Years (2021) as a guest)
	Tommy Beavers	1992–1995	drums	Tribute to the Music of Bob Wills and the Texas Playboys (1993)
	Barbara Lamb	1994–1995	fiddle	The Wheel Keeps on Rollin' (1995)
	Monty Gaylord	1995–1996	fiddle	none – live performances only
	Jason Roberts	1996–2014	fiddle; mandolin; rhythm guitar; backing and occasional lead vocals	all AATW releases from Back to the Future Now: Live at Arizona Charlie's, Las Vegas (1997) to Remembers the Alamo (2003) (except Wide Awake! Live in Oklahoma), and from The Best of Asleep at the Wheel on the Road (2006) to Still the King (2015) (plus Half a Hundred Years (2021) as a guest)
	Chris Booher	1996–2000	piano; fiddle; rhythm guitar; backing vocals	Back to the Future Now: Live at Arizona Charlie's, Las Vegas (1997); Merry Texas Christmas, Y'all (1997); Ride with Bob (1999)
	Rosie Flores	1997 (touring)	lead and backing vocals; rhythm guitar	none – live performances only
	John Michael Whitby	2000–2007	piano; backing vocals	The Very Best of Asleep at the Wheel (2001); Hang Up My Spurs (2002); Live at Billy Bob's Texas (2003); Remembers the Alamo (2003); Santa Loves to Boogie (2006); Reinventing the Wheel (2006); Willie and the Wheel (2009)
	Jim Murphy	2001–2004	steel guitars; dobro; saxophones	Hang Up My Spurs (2002); Live at Billy Bob's Texas (2003); Remembers the Alamo (2003)
	Haydn Vitera	2003–2005	fiddle; rhythm guitar; backing and occasional lead vocals	Live at Billy Bob's Texas (2003); Remembers the Alamo (2003)
	Eddie Rivers	2004–2019	steel guitars; saxophones; backing vocals	all AATW releases from The Best of Asleep at the Wheel on the Road (2006) to New Routes (2018) (plus Half a Hundred Years (2021) as a guest)
	Elizabeth McQueen	2005–2014	lead and backing vocals; rhythm guitar	all AATW releases from The Best of Asleep at the Wheel on the Road (2006) to Still the King (2015) (plus Half a Hundred Years (2021) as a guest)
	Walt Roberts	2006–2007	fiddle; rhythm guitar; backing vocals	none – live performances only
	Ruby Jane Smith	2009 (live only)	fiddle	Willie Nelson and Asleep at the Wheel on Austin City Limits
	Dan Walton	2009–2014	piano	It's a Good Day (2010); Still the King (2015)
	Katie Shore	2014–2023 (occasional guest, 2023–present)	lead and backing vocals; fiddle (lead 2014–16)	all AATW releases from Still the King (2015) to Half a Hundred Years (2021)
	Jay Reynolds	2014–2019	saxophones; clarinet	Still the King (2015); Lone Star Christmas Night (2016); New Routes (2018) (plus Half a Hundred Years (2021) as a guest)
	Emily Gimble	2014–2016	piano; backing vocals	Still the King (2015); Lone Star Christmas Night (2016)
	Chloe Feoranzo	2019 (touring)	saxophones; clarinet	Better Times (2021)
	Joey Colarusso	2021 - late 2025	saxophones - trumpet	Half a Hundred Years (2021)

== Lineups ==
Period	Members	Releases
January – spring 1970	Ray Benson – vocals, guitar; LeRoy Preston – vocals, drums; Lucky Oceans – steel guitars; Danny Levin – piano	none – live performances only
Spring – fall 1970	Ray Benson – vocals, guitar; LeRoy Preston – vocals, drums; Gene Dobkin – vocals, bass; Lucky Oceans – steel guitars; Danny Levin – piano	none – live performances only
Fall 1970 – spring 1971	Ray Benson – vocals, guitar; LeRoy Preston – vocals, drums; Gene Dobkin – vocals, bass; Lucky Oceans – steel guitars; Danny Levin – piano; Chris O'Connell – backing vocals; Emily Paxton – backing vocals	none – live performances only
Spring – August 1971	Ray Benson – vocals, lead guitar; Chris O'Connell – vocals, rhythm guitar; LeRoy Preston – vocals, drums; Gene Dobkin – vocals, bass; Lucky Oceans – steel guitars; Danny Levin – piano	none – live performances only
August 1971 – early 1972	Ray Benson – vocals, lead guitar; Chris O'Connell – vocals, rhythm guitar; LeRoy Preston – vocals, drums; Gene Dobkin – vocals, bass; Lucky Oceans – steel guitars	none – live performances only
Early 1972 – February 1974	Ray Benson – vocals, lead guitar; Chris O'Connell – vocals, rhythm guitar; LeRoy Preston – vocals, drums; Gene Dobkin – vocals, bass; Lucky Oceans – steel guitars; Floyd Domino – piano, organ	Comin' Right at Ya (1973); Live at Ebbets Field 1973 (2004)
Spring 1974 – spring 1975	Ray Benson – vocals, lead guitar; Chris O'Connell – vocals, rhythm guitar; LeRoy Preston – vocals, drums; Lucky Oceans – steel guitars; Tony Garnier – bass; Floyd Domino – piano, organ; Richard Casanova – fiddle	Asleep at the Wheel (1974)
Spring 1975 – early 1976	Ray Benson – vocals, lead guitar; Chris O'Connell – vocals, rhythm guitar; LeRoy Preston – vocals, rhythm guitar; Lucky Oceans – steel guitars; Tony Garnier – bass; Floyd Domino – piano, organ; Scott Hennige – drums; Danny Levin – fiddle, mandolin, piano; Ed Vizard – saxophones	Texas Gold (1975)
Early – August 1976	Ray Benson – vocals, lead guitar; Chris O'Connell – vocals, rhythm guitar; LeRoy Preston – vocals, rhythm guitar; Lucky Oceans – steel guitars; Tony Garnier – bass; Floyd Domino – piano, organ; Scott Hennige – drums; Danny Levin – fiddle, mandolin, piano; Bill Mabry – fiddle; Link Davis Jr. – saxophones, accordion	Wheelin' and Dealin' (1976)
August 1976 – September 1978	Ray Benson – vocals, lead guitar; Chris O'Connell – vocals, rhythm guitar; LeRoy Preston – vocals, rhythm guitar; Lucky Oceans – steel guitars; Tony Garnier – bass; Floyd Domino – piano, organ; Chris York – drums; Danny Levin – fiddle, mandolin, piano; Bill Mabry – fiddle; Link Davis Jr. – saxophones, accordion; Pat Ryan – saxophones, clarinet	The Wheel (1977); Collision Course (1978)
September – December 1978	Ray Benson – vocals, lead guitar; Chris O'Connell – vocals, rhythm guitar; Johnny Nicholas – guitar, piano, vocals; Lucky Oceans – steel guitars; Tony Garnier – bass; Chris York – drums; Danny Levin – fiddle, mandolin, piano; Link Davis Jr. – saxophones, accordion; Pat Ryan – saxophones, clarinet	none – live performances only
December 1978 – spring 1979	Ray Benson – vocals, lead guitar; Chris O'Connell – vocals, rhythm guitar; Johnny Nicholas – guitar, piano, vocals; Lucky Oceans – steel guitars; Spencer Starnes – bass; Fran Christina – drums; Danny Levin – fiddle, mandolin, piano; Pat Ryan – saxophones, clarinet	Served Live (1979)
Spring 1979 – early 1980	Ray Benson – vocals, lead guitar; Chris O'Connell – vocals, rhythm guitar; Johnny Nicholas – guitar, piano, vocals; Lucky Oceans – steel guitars; Dean DeMerritt – bass; Fran Christina – drums; Danny Levin – fiddle, mandolin, piano; Pat Ryan – saxophones, clarinet	none – live performances only
Early – late 1980	Ray Benson – vocals, lead guitar; Chris O'Connell – vocals, rhythm guitar; Maryann Price – vocals; Johnny Nicholas – guitar, piano, vocals; Bobby Black – pedal steel guitar; Dean DeMerritt – bass; Fran Christina – drums; Danny Levin – fiddle, mandolin, piano; Pat Ryan – saxophones, clarinet	Framed (1980) (features Billy Estes in place of Christina, and does not feature Nicholas or Levin)
Early – late 1980	Ray Benson – vocals, lead guitar; Chris O'Connell – vocals, guitar (not touring); Maryann Price – vocals; Brenda Burns – vocals; Johnny Nicholas – guitar, piano, vocals; Bobby Black – pedal steel guitar; Dean DeMerritt – bass; Fran Christina – drums; Danny Levin – fiddle, mandolin, piano; Pat Ryan – saxophones, clarinet	none – live performances only
Spring – summer 1981	Ray Benson – vocals, lead guitar; Chris O'Connell – vocals, guitar (not touring); Maryann Price – vocals; Brenda Burns – vocals; Dan Tyack – pedal steel guitar; Dean DeMerritt – bass; Falkner Evans – piano, organ; Billy Estes – drums; Paul Anastasio – fiddle; Pat Ryan – saxophones, clarinet	none – live performances only
Summer – late 1981	Ray Benson – vocals, lead guitar; Chris O'Connell – vocals, guitar (not touring); Maryann Price – vocals; Jann Browne – vocals (touring only); Wally Murphy – pedal steel guitar; Dean DeMerritt – bass; Falkner Evans – piano, organ; Steve Schwelling – drums; Paul Anastasio – fiddle; Michael Francis – saxophones, clarinet	none – live performances only
Late 1981 – summer 1982	Ray Benson – vocals, lead guitar; Chris O'Connell – vocals, guitar (not touring); Maryann Price – vocals; Jann Browne – vocals (touring only); Wally Murphy – pedal steel guitar; Spencer Starnes – bass; Falkner Evans – piano, organ; Steve Schwelling – drums; Paul Anastasio – fiddle; Michael Francis – saxophones, clarinet	Pasture Prime (1985) – four tracks
Summer – fall 1982	Ray Benson – vocals, lead guitar; Chris O'Connell – vocals, guitar (not touring); Jann Browne – vocals (touring only); Wally Murphy – pedal steel guitar; Tom Anastasio – bass; Falkner Evans – piano, organ; Roy McCrory – drums; Paul Anastasio – fiddle; Michael Francis – saxophones, clarinet	none – live performances only
Fall 1982 – 1983	Ray Benson – vocals, lead guitar; Chris O'Connell – vocals, guitar (not touring); Jann Browne – vocals (touring only); Wally Murphy – pedal steel guitar; Tom Anastasio – bass; Falkner Evans – piano, organ; Richard Hormachea – drums; Paul Anastasio – fiddle; Michael Francis – saxophones, clarinet	none – live performances only
1983 – early 1984	Ray Benson – vocals, lead guitar; Chris O'Connell – vocals, rhythm guitar; Wally Murphy – pedal steel guitar; Tom Anastasio – bass; Falkner Evans – piano, organ; Richard Hormachea – drums; Paul Anastasio – fiddle; Michael Francis – saxophones, clarinet	Pasture Prime (1985) – seven tracks
Early 1984 – early 1985	Ray Benson – vocals, lead guitar; Chris O'Connell – vocals, rhythm guitar; Wally Murphy – pedal steel guitar; Tom Anastasio – bass; Falkner Evans – piano, organ; Richard Hormachea – drums; Billy Cochran – fiddle; Michael Francis – saxophones, clarinet	none – live performances only
1985–1986	Ray Benson – vocals, lead guitar; Chris O'Connell – vocals, rhythm guitar; Junior Brown – lap steel guitar; Tom Anastasio – bass; Tim Alexander – piano, accordion, vocals; Mike Grammar – drums; Larry Franklin – fiddle, guitar, vocals; Michael Francis – saxophones, clarinet	Pasture Prime (1985) – two tracks
1986 – summer 1988	Ray Benson – lead vocals, guitar; John Ely – steel guitars; David Dawson – bass; Tim Alexander – piano, accordion, vocals; David Sanger – drums, percussion; Larry Franklin – fiddle, guitar, vocals; Michael Francis – saxophones, clarinet	10 (1987)
Summer 1988 – early 1991	Ray Benson – lead vocals, guitar; John Ely – steel guitars; Jon Mitchell – bass, vocals; Tim Alexander – piano, accordion, vocals; David Sanger – drums, percussion; Larry Franklin – fiddle, guitar, vocals; Michael Francis – saxophones, clarinet	Western Standard Time (1988); Keepin' Me Up Nights (1990)
Early 1991 – mid-1992	Ray Benson – lead vocals, guitar; John Ely – steel guitars; Jon Mitchell – bass, vocals; Tim Alexander – piano, accordion, vocals; David Sanger – drums, percussion; Ricky Turpin – fiddle, mandolin, vocals; Michael Francis – saxophones, clarinet	Greatest Hits: Live & Kickin' (1992)
Mid – late 1992	Ray Benson – lead vocals, guitar; Cindy Cashdollar – steel guitars; David Miller – bass, backing vocals; Tim Alexander – piano, accordion, vocals; David Sanger – drums, percussion; Ricky Turpin – fiddle, mandolin, vocals; Michael Francis – saxophones, clarinet	Live from Austin, TX (2006)
Late 1992 – summer 1994	Ray Benson – lead vocals, guitar; Cindy Cashdollar – steel guitars; David Miller – bass, backing vocals; Tim Alexander – piano, accordion, vocals; Tommy Beavers – drums; Ricky Turpin – fiddle, mandolin, vocals; Michael Francis – saxophones, clarinet	Tribute to the Music of Bob Wills and the Texas Playboys (1993)
Summer 1994 – early 1995	Ray Benson – lead vocals, guitar; Cindy Cashdollar – steel guitars; David Miller – bass, backing vocals; Tim Alexander – piano, accordion, vocals; Tommy Beavers – drums; Ricky Turpin – fiddle, mandolin, vocals; Michael Francis – saxophones, clarinet	none – live performances only
Early – late 1995	Ray Benson – lead vocals, guitar; Cindy Cashdollar – steel guitars; David Miller – bass, backing vocals; Tim Alexander – piano, accordion, vocals; David Sanger – drums, percussion; Barbara Lamb – fiddle; Michael Francis – saxophones, clarinet	The Wheel Keeps on Rollin' (1995)
Late 1995 – 1996	Ray Benson – lead vocals, guitar; Cindy Cashdollar – steel guitars; David Miller – bass, backing vocals; Tim Alexander – piano, accordion, vocals; David Sanger – drums, percussion; Monty Gaylord – fiddle; Michael Francis – saxophones, clarinet	none – live performances only
1996 – April 1997	Ray Benson – lead vocals, lead guitar; Cindy Cashdollar – steel guitars; David Miller – bass, backing vocals; Chris Booher – piano, fiddle, vocals; David Sanger – drums, percussion; Jason Roberts – fiddle, guitar, vocals; Michael Francis – saxophones, clarinet	Back to the Future Now: Live at Arizona Charlie's, Las Vegas (1997)
April – late 1997	Ray Benson – vocals, lead guitar; Rosie Flores – vocals, guitar (touring only); Cindy Cashdollar – steel guitars; David Miller – bass, backing vocals; Chris Booher – piano, fiddle, vocals; David Sanger – drums, percussion; Jason Roberts – fiddle, guitar, vocals; Michael Francis – saxophones, clarinet	Merry Texas Christmas, Y'all (1997)
Late 1997 – spring 2000	Ray Benson – lead vocals, lead guitar; Cindy Cashdollar – steel guitars; David Miller – bass, backing vocals; Chris Booher – piano, fiddle, vocals; David Sanger – drums, percussion; Jason Roberts – fiddle, guitar, vocals; Michael Francis – saxophones, clarinet	Ride with Bob: A Tribute to Bob Wills and the Texas Playboys (1999)
Spring 2000 – summer 2001	Ray Benson – lead vocals, lead guitar; Cindy Cashdollar – steel guitars; David Miller – bass, backing vocals; John Michael Whitby – piano, vocals; David Sanger – drums, percussion; Jason Roberts – fiddle, guitar, vocals; Michael Francis – saxophones, clarinet	The Very Best of Asleep at the Wheel (2001)
Summer – late 2001	Ray Benson – lead vocals, lead guitar; Jim Murphy – steel guitars; David Miller – bass, backing vocals; John Michael Whitby – piano, vocals; David Sanger – drums, percussion; Jason Roberts – fiddle, guitar, vocals; Michael Francis – saxophones, clarinet	none – live performances only
Late 2001 – early 2003	Ray Benson – lead vocals, lead guitar; Jim Murphy – steel guitars, saxophone; David Miller – bass, backing vocals; John Michael Whitby – piano, vocals; David Sanger – drums, percussion; Jason Roberts – fiddle, guitar, vocals	Hang Up My Spurs (2002)
Early 2003 – May 2004	Ray Benson – lead vocals, lead guitar; Jim Murphy – steel guitars, saxophone; David Miller – bass, backing vocals; John Michael Whitby – piano, vocals; David Sanger – drums, percussion; Jason Roberts – fiddle, guitar, vocals; Haydn Vitera – fiddle, guitar, vocals	Live at Billy Bob's Texas (2003); Remember the Alamo (2003)
June 2004 – spring 2005	Ray Benson – lead vocals, lead guitar; Eddie Rivers – steel guitars, saxophone, vocals; David Miller – bass, backing vocals; John Michael Whitby – piano, vocals; David Sanger – drums, percussion; Jason Roberts – fiddle, guitar, vocals; Haydn Vitera – fiddle, guitar, vocals	none – live performances only
Spring 2005 – early 2006	Ray Benson – vocals, lead guitar; Elizabeth McQueen – vocals, rhythm guitar; Eddie Rivers – steel guitars, saxophone, vocals; David Miller – bass, backing vocals; John Michael Whitby – piano, vocals; David Sanger – drums, percussion; Jason Roberts – fiddle, guitar, vocals	none – live performances only
Early – late 2006	Ray Benson – vocals, lead guitar; Elizabeth McQueen – vocals, rhythm guitar; Eddie Rivers – steel guitars, saxophone, vocals; David Miller – bass, backing vocals; John Michael Whitby – piano, vocals; David Sanger – drums, percussion; Jason Roberts – fiddle, guitar, vocals	The Best of Asleep at the Wheel on the Road (2006) (features Tim Alexander in place of Whitby); Santa Loves to Boogie (2006); Reinventing the Wheel (2006)
Late 2006 – early 2007	Ray Benson – vocals, lead guitar; Elizabeth McQueen – vocals, rhythm guitar; Eddie Rivers – steel guitars, saxophone, vocals; David Miller – bass, backing vocals; John Michael Whitby – piano, vocals; David Sanger – drums, percussion; Jason Roberts – fiddle, guitar, vocals; Walt Roberts – fiddle, guitar, vocals	none – live performances only
Early 2007 – summer 2009	Ray Benson – vocals, lead guitar; Elizabeth McQueen – vocals, rhythm guitar; Eddie Rivers – steel guitars, saxophone, vocals; David Miller – bass, backing vocals; Floyd Domino – piano, organ; David Sanger – drums, percussion; Jason Roberts – fiddle, guitar, vocals	Asleep at the Wheel with the Fort Worth Symphony Orchestra (2007); Willie and the Wheel (2009)
Summer 2009 – January 2014	Ray Benson – vocals, lead guitar; Elizabeth McQueen – vocals, rhythm guitar; Eddie Rivers – steel guitars, saxophone, vocals; David Miller – bass, backing vocals; Dan Walton – piano; David Sanger – drums, percussion; Jason Roberts – fiddle, guitar, vocals	It's a Good Day (2010)
January – spring 2014	Ray Benson – vocals, lead guitar; Katie Shore – vocals, fiddle; Eddie Rivers – steel guitars, saxophone, vocals; David Miller – bass, backing vocals; Dan Walton – piano; David Sanger – drums, percussion; Jason Roberts – fiddle, guitar, vocals	none – live performances only
Summer 2014 – January 2016	Ray Benson – vocals, guitar; Katie Shore – vocals, fiddle; Eddie Rivers – steel guitars, vocals; David Miller – bass, backing vocals; Emily Gimble – piano, vocals; David Sanger – drums, percussion; Jay Reynolds – saxophones, clarinet	Still the King (2015)
January – April 2016	Ray Benson – vocals, guitar; Katie Shore – vocals, fiddle; Eddie Rivers – steel guitars, vocals; David Miller – bass, backing vocals; Emily Gimble – piano, vocals; David Sanger – drums, percussion; Dennis Ludiker – fiddle, mandolin, vocals; Jay Reynolds – saxophones, clarinet	Lone Star Christmas Night (2016)
April 2016 – summer 2017	Ray Benson – vocals, guitar; Katie Shore – vocals, fiddle; Eddie Rivers – steel guitars, vocals; David Miller – bass, backing vocals; Connor Forsyth – piano, organ, vocals; David Sanger – drums, percussion; Dennis Ludiker – fiddle, mandolin, vocals; Jay Reynolds – saxophones, clarinet	none – live performances only
Summer 2017 – June 2019	Ray Benson – vocals, guitar; Katie Shore – vocals, fiddle; Eddie Rivers – steel guitars, vocals; Connor Forsyth – piano, organ, vocals; Josh Hoag – bass; David Sanger – drums, percussion; Dennis Ludiker – fiddle, mandolin, vocals; Jay Reynolds – saxophones, clarinet	New Routes (2018)
June – September 2019	Ray Benson – vocals, guitar; Katie Shore – vocals, fiddle; Cindy Cashdollar – steel guitars (touring); Connor Forsyth – piano, organ, vocals; Josh Hoag – bass; David Sanger – drums, percussion; Dennis Ludiker – fiddle, mandolin, vocals; Chloe Feoranzo – saxophones (touring)	none – live performances only
September 2019 – fall 2020	Ray Benson – vocals, guitar; Katie Shore – vocals, fiddle; Flavio Pasquetto – steel guitars; Connor Forsyth – piano, organ, vocals; Josh Hoag – bass; David Sanger – drums, percussion; Dennis Ludiker – fiddle, mandolin, vocals	none – live performances only
Fall 2020 – May 2021	Ray Benson – vocals, guitar; Katie Shore – vocals, fiddle; Flavio Pasquetto – steel guitars; Connor Forsyth – piano, organ, vocals; Josh Hoag – bass; Jason Baczynski – drums; Dennis Ludiker – fiddle, mandolin, vocals	Better Times (2021) (does not feature Forsyth)
May 2021 – present	Ray Benson – vocals, guitar; Katie Shore – vocals, fiddle; Flavio Pasquetto – steel guitars; Connor Forsyth – piano, organ, vocals; Josh Hoag – bass; Jason Baczynski – drums; Dennis Ludiker – fiddle, mandolin, vocals; Joey Colarussos – saxophones, trumpet	Half a Hundred Years (2021) (does not feature Forsyth)
