= Framed (Asleep at the Wheel album) =

Studio album by Asleep at the Wheel
- Released: August 5, 1980
- Recorded: February – May 1980
- Studios: Austin Recording Studio; Pecan Street Studios; Ruff Cedar Studios (all Austin, Texas); Sumet-Bernet Sound Studio (Dallas, Texas)
- Genres: Country; Western swing
- Length: 34:21
- Label: MCA
- Producer: Ray Benson

Asleep at the Wheel chronology
Served Live (1979)	Framed (1980)	Pasture Prime (1985)

Singles from Framed
- 1. "Don't Get Caught Out in the Rain" Released: October 1980

Framed is the seventh studio album by American country band Asleep at the Wheel. Recorded at several studios in Austin and Dallas, Texas, it was produced solely by the band's frontman Ray Benson and released on August 5, 1980, as the group's only album on MCA Records. Following the departure of the group's primary songwriter LeRoy Preston (and other members) in 1978, the original material on Framed was written primarily by Benson, with Chris O'Connell the only other credited member.

Following numerous lineup changes and the band's departure from Capitol Records after five years, Framed marked a stylistic departure for Asleep at the Wheel, who reduced their regular Bob Wills-influenced Western swing output and explored other genres including rock, easy listening and jazz. The album was the group's first not to feature steel guitarist Lucky Oceans, who left Benson as the sole remaining original member when he left in early 1980 to spend time with his family in Australia.

Framed was Asleep at the Wheel's last release to chart in the US for ten years, reaching number 191 on the Billboard 200. The album received generally positive reviews from critics, who applauded the band's experimentation with other genres. However, retrospective commentators and band members have identified this departure as the main reason for the group's subsequent dip in popularity. Framed was the band's last album for five years, as lineup changes and financial issues continued.

== Background ==
Following the release of the band's sixth studio album Collision Course in 1978, vocalist, guitarist and main songwriter LeRoy Preston, pianist Floyd Domino and fiddler Bill Mabry all left Asleep at the Wheel. By the end of the year, bassist Tony Garnier and drummer Chris York had also been replaced. Several members also left after 1979's Served Live, including four recent additions to the lineup and founding steel guitarist Lucky Oceans, who moved to Australia to be with his family.

As a result of so many personnel changes and departures, Framed features a reduced lineup of just seven members, including debutants Maryann Price on vocals, Bobby Black on pedal steel guitar, Dean Demmerritt on bass and Billy Estes on drums. The album is the band's first since its 1973 debut Comin' Right at Ya not to feature a full-time fiddler, with only Johnny Gimble credited for the role, and the last to feature saxophonist Pat "Taco" Ryan, who left soon after its release.

== Production ==
In early 1980, Asleep at the Wheel signed with MCA Records, ending the band's five year-spell with Capitol. It was originally reported that the group was set to record its first album for the label with esteemed rhythm and blues producer Jerry Wexler, however this idea was later snubbed and the band's frontman Ray Benson ultimately handled the role. Recording was completed between February and May at Austin, Pecan Street and Ruff Cedar Studios in Austin, Texas, and Sumet-Bernet Studios in Dallas. Framed was released by MCA on August 5, 1980. Within just a few weeks, it was announced that vocalist and rhythm guitarist Chris O'Connell had left the band. However, this would later prove to be just a temporary leave of absence, and she continued recording with the band.

Discussing the background and production of Framed, frontman Benson claimed in a 2003 interview that a directive from MCA was responsible for the album's departure from country and Western swing music, recalling that "The guy at the record label said, "Look, I'll give you X amount of dollars to make a record that's anything but country or Western swing music." And it was more money than we'd ever been given to make a record before. We went, "Ok!" Because they’d reached a plateau and figured everyone wanted to cross over". Describing the release as "a fantastic record", Benson admitted that "It took another couple of years of stumbling around [after the album's release] to realize that ... people all over wanted to hear us do Western swing because nobody else did it, and we did it well."

== Reception ==
=== Commercial ===
Framed was Asleep at the Wheel's last release to chart on the US Billboard 200 albums chart for over ten years, peaking at number 191 (the lowest position of any of the band's charting albums). In other publications, it peaked at number 59 on the Record World country albums chart, and at number 62 on the equivalent chart in Cash Box magazine.

=== Critical ===
Professional ratings
Review scores
Source	Rating
The Rolling Stone Album Guide	3/5 stars

Reviews for Framed were generally positive. Cash Box magazine introduced the album as "the perfect primer for this campy Texas band", describing it as "A cross between the Texas swing of Bob Wills and the herky jerky '30s sound of Dan Hicks and his Hot Licks ... more fun than a ride on the mechanical bull at full speed". Another review in the same publication a week later noted that "many of the tunes are a little "rockier" than past Asleep works," but assured readers that the "distinctive Wheel sound is still intact". Record World also highlighted the album's "new musical direction" and "mixture of diverse styles".

Writing for The Washington Post, Joanne Ostrow spoke highly of the band's decision to move away from traditional country and Western music, proclaiming that "the selections display an infectious energy, without the sobbing vocals of mainstream country & western." Ostrow also praised the orchestral performances as "smooth" and "polished", commended female vocalists Chris O'Connell and Maryann Price for their "bubbling harmonies", and applauded frontman Ray Benson's "cool crooning" voice. She concluded her review by stating that "In short, the group is fresh as a country breeze and every bit as cool."

== Track listing ==
No.	Title	Writer(s)	Length
1.	"Midnight in Memphis" (originally recorded by the Moonlighters)	Tony Johnson	4:00
2.	"Lonely Avenue Revisited"	Ray Benson	5:04
3.	"Slow Dancing"	John Girton	3:13
4.	"Cool as a Breeze"	Benson	3:00
5.	"You Wanna Give Me a Lift" (originally recorded by Loretta Lynn)	Loretta Lynn	3:26
6.	"Don't Get Caught Out in the Rain"	Harvey Thomas Young; Danny Levin; Chris O'Connell	4:40
7.	"Whatever It Takes"	Benson	3:59
8.	"Fiddle Funk – Corn Fusion"	Benson; Andy Stein	3:20
9.	"Up, Up, Up"	Dan Hicks	2:02
10.	"Musical Talk"	Benson	6:37
Total length:			34:21

== Personnel ==
Asleep at the Wheel

Additional personnel

- Ray Benson – vocals, lead guitar, tambourine, production
- Chris O'Connell – vocals, rhythm guitar
- Maryann Price – vocals
- Bobby Black – pedal steel guitar
- Dean Demmerrit – upright and electric basses
- Billy Estes – drums, percussion
- Pat "Taco" Ryan – saxophones, flute
- Spencer Starnes – bass
- Tommy Allsup – tic-tac six-string bass
- Jamie Oldaker – drums, percussion
- Fran Christina – drums
- Chris York – percussion
- Ron Snyder – percussion
- Johnny Gimble – fiddle
- Paul Ostermayer – saxophones, flute
- Robert Meyer – saxophone, trumpet
- Frank "Jalapeño" Rodarte – saxophone
- Steve "The Doctor" Kupka – baritone saxophone
- Bonnie Raitt – vocals (track 2)
- Vince McGarry – production assistance, engineering
- Linda Bagget – production assistance

== Charts ==
Chart (1980)	Peak position
US Billboard 200	191
