= Wheelin' and Dealin' (Asleep at the Wheel album) =

Studio album by Asleep at the Wheel
- Released: July 1976
- Recorded: March – April 1976
- Studios: Woodland Sound Studio (Nashville, Tennessee)
- Genres: Western swing; swing; country; Cajun; rock and roll
- Length: 32:56
- Label: Capitol
- Producer: Tommy Allsup

Asleep at the Wheel chronology
Texas Gold (1975)	Wheelin' and Dealin' (1976)	The Wheel (1977)

Singles from Wheelin' and Dealin'
- 1. "Route 66" Released: July 1976; 2. "Miles and Miles of Texas" Released: October 1976; 3. "The Trouble with Loving Today" Released: February 1977

Wheelin' and Dealin' is the fourth album by American western swing band Asleep at the Wheel. Produced by Tommy Allsup at Woodland Sound Studio in Nashville, Tennessee, it was released in July 1976 as the group's second album on Capitol Records. It is the band's first album to feature a second fiddler, Bill Mabry, as well as saxophonist Link Davis Jr. The album was a commercial success, charting on the US Billboard 200 and reaching the top 20 of the Top Country Albums chart.

After achieving commercial success for the first time on 1975's Texas Gold, Asleep at the Wheel worked again with producer Tommy Allsup for Capitol, which marked the first time the group had produced two albums for the same label. The record featured a range of new guest musicians, including former Bob Wills guitarist Eldon Shamblin and mandolinist Tiny Moore, and was the last album by the group for several years to feature recurring guests Johnny Gimble and Bucky Meadows.

Wheelin' and Dealin' was a critical and commercial success. It was the second of the band's albums to chart in the US, peaking at number 179 on the Billboard 200 and number 19 on the Top Country Albums chart. The collection's lead single – a recording of Bobby Troup's "(Get Your Kicks on) Route 66" – reached number 48 on the Hot Country Songs chart, while its follow-up "Miles and Miles of Texas" (originally by Jim McGraw and the Western Sundowners) broke into the top 40.

== Background ==
For the recording of their fourth album, Asleep at the Wheel again enlisted Tommy Allsup as producer, with whom they had previously worked on 1973's Comin' Right at Ya and 1975's Texas Gold. Recording took place between March and April 1976, and the album was released in July. The album was the band's last to feature Scott Hennige on drums, who had joined in time for the recording of Texas Gold. He was replaced by Chris York in August 1976.

== Reception ==
=== Commercial ===
Upon its release, Wheelin' and Dealin' debuted at number 189 on the US Billboard 200, and at number 38 on the Top Country Albums chart. After several weeks on the charts, the album peaked at number 179 on the main albums chart and number 19 on the country chart. Aside from the Billboard charts, Wheelin' and Dealin' reached number 13 on the Cash Box Top Country Albums chart, and peaked at number 20 on the Record World Country Album Chart.

=== Critical ===
Professional ratings
Review scores
Source	Rating
AllMusic	3.5/5 stars
Christgau's Record Guide	B
Tom Hull – on the Web	B+

Media response to Wheelin' and Dealin' was generally positive. Cash Box magazine hailed the album as "a strong indicator that people want to get back to good-time music", praising "Route 66" and "Shout Wa Hey" in particular. Radio & Records also highlighted the two tracks, alongside "Cajun Stripper" and "They Raided the Place", in a short review which recognised the record as featuring "Great country swing music, ballads and boogie woogie". Canadian music magazine RPM wrote that the album's "Repertoire is dynamite" and noted that it included "Lots of surprises", suggesting that the release was the band's "tightest LP to date".

In a retrospective review of the album for website AllMusic, James Chrispell awarded the album three and a half out of five stars and stated: "Combining old-fashioned swing, western swing, country ballads, Cajun and good ol' rock & roll, Asleep at the Wheel turns a wonderful performance on Wheelin' and Dealin'." Robert Christgau awarded the album a B rating, slightly lower than its predecessor Texas Gold, noting that "this LP singles out no really striking nonoriginals".

=== Accolades ===
"Route 66" was nominated for the Grammy Award for Best Country Vocal Performance by a Duo or Group.

== Track listing ==
No.	Title	Writer(s)	Length
1.	"Route 66" (originally recorded by the King Cole Trio)	Bobby Troup	2:50
2.	"Miles and Miles of Texas" (originally recorded by Jim McGraw and the Western Sundowners)	Tommy Camfield; Diane Johnston	3:03
3.	"The Trouble with Loving Today"	Kevin Farrell	3:33
4.	"Shout Wa Hey"	LeRoy Preston; Jim Haber	2:46
5.	"Blues for Dixie" (originally recorded by Bob Wills and His Texas Playboys)	Oliver Wendell Mayo	3:58
6.	"The Cajun Stripper" (originally recorded by Rusty and Doug)	Rusty Kershaw; Doug Kershaw	2:27
7.	"If I Can't Love You"	Preston	2:54
8.	"Lost Mind" (originally recorded by Percy Mayfield)	Percy Mayfield	3:46
9.	"They Raided the Place" (originally recorded by Hot Lips Page and His Orchestra)	Louis Jordan; Dan Burley	4:05
10.	"We've Gone as Far as We Can Go"	Linda Hargrove	2:49
Total length:			32:56

== Personnel ==
Asleep at the Wheel

- Ray Benson – vocals, lead guitar
- Chris O'Connell – vocals, rhythm guitar
- LeRoy Preston – vocals, rhythm guitar
- Lucky Oceans – pedal and lap steel guitars
- Tony Garnier – upright and electric basses
- Floyd Domino – piano, organ
- Scott Hennige – drums
- Danny Levin – fiddle, electric mandolin
- Bill Mabry – fiddle
- Link Davis Jr. – tenor and alto saxophones, fiddle

Additional personnel

- Bucky Meadows – guitar on "Miles And Miles Of Texas"
- Eldon Shamblin – rhythm guitar on "Blues For Dixie"
- Linda Hargrove – rhythm guitar on "We've Gone As Far As We Can Go"
- Johnny Gimble – fiddle, electric mandolin
- Tiny Moore – electric mandolin on "Blues For Dixie"
- Denis Solee – alto, tenor, and baritone saxophones
- Arnett Cobb – saxophone on "They Raided The Joint"
- Jo-El Sonnier – accordion on "The Cajun Stripper"
- Tommy Allsup – co-producer
- Jay Maynard – mastering

== Charts ==
Chart (1976)	Peak position
US Billboard 200	179
US Hot Country LPs (Billboard)	19
