= The Wheel (Asleep at the Wheel album) =

Studio album by Asleep at the Wheel
- Released: March 14, 1977
- Recorded: January 1977
- Studio: Sumet-Bernet Studios (Dallas, Texas)
- Genre: Western swing; country; big band
- Length: 36:39
- Label: Capitol Records
- Producer: Tommy Allsup

Asleep at the Wheel chronology
Wheelin' and Dealin' (1976)	The Wheel (1977)	Collision Course (1978)

Singles from The Wheel
- 1. "Somebody Stole His Body" Released: June 1977; 2. "My Baby Thinks She's a Train" Released: June 1977 (UK only)

The Wheel is the fifth album by American western swing band Asleep at the Wheel. Produced by Tommy Allsup at Sumet-Bernet Studios in Dallas, Texas, it was released on March 14, 1977, as the group's third album on Capitol Records. Unlike the band's previous releases, all of which included covers of songs originally recorded by popular country and jazz artists, The Wheel features entirely original material (save for one traditional song), most of which was written by band member LeRoy Preston.

Following the release of Wheelin' and Dealin' the previous year, Asleep at the Wheel expanded to an 11-piece unit with the addition of second saxophonist Patrick "Taco" Ryan. For the recording of The Wheel, the band and Allsup opted to work entirely in Texas for the first time, rather than returning to Nashville, Tennessee. As well as being the first all-original album by the band, it is also their first not to feature multiple additional musicians, with Leon Rausch the sole guest on just one track.

The Wheel was Asleep at the Wheel's third consecutive album to register on the US Billboard 200 albums chart (on which it peaked at number 162) and to reach the top 40 of the Top Country Albums chart (on which it peaked at number 31). Just one single was issued from the record – the Rausch-featured "Somebody Stole His Body", which failed to chart. Reviews for the album were generally positive, with critics praising the "fun" nature of the music alongside the high quality of the performances.

== Background ==
For the recording of The Wheel, Asleep at the Wheel opted not to work in Nashville, Tennessee for the first time, instead recording their fifth studio album at Sumet-Bernet Studios in Dallas, Texas, where Bob Wills' final studio album For the Last Time was tracked. The band's pedal steel guitarist Lucky Oceans recalls that the album was recorded "basically live" with no overdubs, resulting in what he describes as the group's "most live sounding studio album". After the recording completed in January 1977, the album was released by Capitol Records on March 14, 1977. "Somebody Stole His Body" was released as the sole single in June 1977.

== Reception ==
=== Commercial ===
Upon its release, The Wheel debuted on the US Billboard Top Country Albums chart at number 40 and the Billboard 200 top albums chart at number 181. It later peaked at number 31 on the country chart (12 places lower than Wheelin' and Dealin') and number 162 on the main albums chart (18 positions higher than Wheelin' and Dealin'). The album also reached number 23 on the Cash Box Top 50 Country Albums chart, number 153 on the Record World Album Chart, and number 14 on the publication's Country Album Chart. "Somebody Stole His Body" did not chart.

=== Critical ===
Professional ratings
Review scores
Source	Rating
AllMusic	4/5 stars
Christgau's Record Guide	A−
The Rolling Stone Album Guide	4/5 stars
Tom Hull – on the Web	B+

Reviews for The Wheel were widely positive. An uncredited review of the album in Billboard hailed the record as "Some more first-rate western swing ... from a group that has mastered this form," noting that it features "a powerfully authentic feel for music in the Bob Wills tradition". Similarly, Cash Box described the record as "a highly compatible coupling of country and big band sounds that assures this band its own special niche," proclaiming that "Western swing never had it so good." Both publications awarded particular praise to Tommy Allsup's production, with the former enjoying the "solid, bouncy instrumentation" throughout.

AllMusic writer Michael Ofjord noted that "The Wheel finds Asleep at the Wheel consistently making music full of fun, along with fine musicianship and a sense of purpose". He added: "What sets this record above other bands ... is a sense of integrity beneath the surface. However, that sense of purpose is never so heavy-handed that a feeling of festivity is too far away. [...] Asleep at the Wheel has made a fine record that will appeal to both the average fan and serious students of the Western swing tradition." Music critic Robert Christgau gave the album an A− grade, his highest for the band since their debut, Comin' Right at Ya.

=== Accolades ===
Following the release of The Wheel, Asleep at the Wheel were nominated for two Grammy Awards: the album received a nomination for Best Country Performance by a Duo or Group with Vocal, while "Ragtime Annie" was recognised in the category of Best Country Instrumental Performance.

== Track listing ==
No.	Title	Writer(s)	Length
1.	"The Wheel"	Asleep at the Wheel	4:14
2.	"I Wonder"	LeRoy Preston	3:23
3.	"Am I High?"	Ray Benson; Chris O'Connell; Peter Sheridan	3:53
4.	"A Dollar Short and a Day Late"	Benson; Preston; Kevin Farrell	3:15
5.	"My Baby Thinks She's a Train"	Preston	3:23
6.	"Ragtime Annie"	Traditional; arranged by Asleep at the Wheel	2:43
7.	"When Love Goes Wrong"	Preston	2:52
8.	"Somebody Stole His Body"	Preston	2:43
9.	"Let's Face Up"	Preston; Farrell	3:12
10.	"I Can't Handle It Now"	Preston	3:12
11.	"Red Stick"	Link Davis Jr.	2:58

== Personnel ==
Asleep at the Wheel

- Ray Benson – lead guitar, vocals
- Chris O'Connell – rhythm guitar, vocals
- LeRoy Preston – rhythm guitar, vocals
- Lucky Oceans – pedal steel guitar
- Tony Garnier – upright bass
- Floyd Domino – piano
- Chris York – drums
- Danny Levin – fiddle, mandolin
- Bill Mabry – fiddle
- Link Davis Jr. – alto and tenor saxophones, accordion, vocals
- Patrick "Taco" Ryan – alto and tenor saxophones, clarinet

Additional personnel

- Leon Rausch – backing vocals (track 8)
- Tommy Allsup – production
- Bob Sullivan – engineering
- Michael Priest – design
- Richard Shaughnessy – photography
- Jim Fetty – photography
- Kathy Card – photography
- Bill Sosin – photography

== Charts ==
Chart (1977)	Peak position
US Billboard 200	162
US Hot Country LPs (Billboard)	31
