= Served Live =

Live album by Asleep at the Wheel
- Released: June 11, 1979
- Recorded: January 19 and 20, 1979
- Venue: Austin Opry House (Austin, Texas)
- Genre: Country; Western swing
- Length: 42:25
- Label: Capitol
- Producer: Ray Benson; Chuck Flood

Asleep at the Wheel chronology
| Collision Course (1978) | Served Live (1979) | Framed (1980) |

Singles from Served Live
- 1. "Choo Choo Ch'Boogie" Released: June 1979

Served Live is the first live album by American country band Asleep at the Wheel. Recorded over two nights at the Austin Opry House in Austin, Texas in January 1979, it was produced by the band's frontman Ray Benson with Chuck Flood, and released on June 11, 1979 as the group's final album on Capitol Records. Neither the album nor its sole single, "Choo Choo Ch'Boogie", registered on the US Billboard record charts – the band's first album since 1974 not to do so.

Following the release of Collision Course in 1978, several members left Asleep at the Wheel. Served Live is thus the band's first album not to feature founding member LeRoy Preston and original pianist Floyd Domino. It was also the first since their debut not to feature bassist Tony Garnier, and also marked the departures of fiddler Bill Mabry and drummer Chris York. New members on the record were Johnny Nicholas, Spencer Starnes, Daniel J. Menudo and Fran Christina.

== Background ==
Asleep at the Wheel's first live album was recorded on January 19 and 20, 1979 at the Austin Opry House in Austin, Texas. The recording was facilitated by Manchaca, Texas-based remote recording company Reelsound, with Chuck Flood producing and Hugh Davies engineering. The album was the band's first not to feature founding member LeRoy Preston and original pianist Floyd Domino, both of whom had left the previous year alongside bassist Tony Garnier, fiddler Bill Mabry and drummer Chris York. In the place of the departed members were guitarist Johnny Nicholas, bassist Spencer Starnes, pianist Daniel J. Menudo and drummer Fran Christina.

Served Live was released by Capitol Records on June 11, 1979. The album did not register on the official US Billboard charts, although it did reach number 10 on the Record World Country Albums chart, number 57 on the Cash Box Top Country Albums chart, and number 166 on the Cash Box Top Albums chart. The performance of "Choo Choo Ch'Boogie", originally recorded for the band's second album Asleep at the Wheel, was released as the album's only single in June 1979.

== Reception ==
Professional ratings
Review scores
| Source | Rating |
|---|---|
| AllMusic | 2/5 stars |
| Robert Christgau | C+ |

Contemporary reviews of Served Live were generally positive. Cash Box magazine described the record as "another solid package of big band material that could make even the staunchest non-dancer get up and do some toe-tapping and finger-snapping," and as "a live album full of energy and spice and lots of sassy horns". Similarly, a short review published in Record World magazine noted that "The group is well-known for its rousing live performances, and much of that energy is captured here, from the laid-back jazzy treatment ... to the good time honky-tonk mood" praising the collection as "a nice balance of sound quality and the live presence". People magazine claimed that "There's a gutsy, loose Friday-Saturday night feel to the album", praising the band for "demonstrat[ing] a gratifying recognition of their musical heritage".

Retrospective reviews for Served Live were less positive. Robert Christgau awarded the album a C+ rating, his lowest for any of the band's releases to date, writing that "Side one is playable, although "God Bless the Child" was born under a bad sign, and the hot live performances don't suit the living room as well as the more delicate studio versions available on three out of five songs. Side two, however, sounds terribly forced. Not only does John Nicholas's overstated, bloozey original make clear that LeRoy Preston's songwriting is going to be missed, but his duet with Chris O'Connell is too close to Peggy Scott and Jo-Jo Benson to remain so far away." On AllMusic, the album is rated two out of five stars, also the lowest of the band's releases up to that point, although no written review is included.

== Track listing ==
| No. | Title | Writer(s) | Length |
|---|---|---|---|
| 1. | "Choo Choo Ch'Boogie" | Vaughn Horton; Milt Gabler; Denver Darling | 4:07 |
| 2. | "The Last Meal" | Denny Hall | 3:58 |
| 3. | "God Bless the Child" | Billie Holiday; Arthur Herzog Jr. | 4:53 |
| 4. | "Jumpin' at the Woodside" | Count Basie; Jon Hendricks | 4:22 |
| 5. | "Am I High?" | Ray Benson; Chris O'Connell; Peter Sheridan | 3:25 |
| 6. | "(Get Your Kicks on) Route 66" | Bobby Troup | 3:37 |
| 7. | "Baby, You've Got What It Takes" | Murray Stein; Clyde Otis | 3:32 |
| 8. | "Too Many Bad Habits" | Johnny Nicholas | 4:39 |
| 9. | "Miles and Miles of Texas" | Tommy Camfield; Diane Johnston | 3:32 |
| 10. | "Will the Circle Be Unbroken" | Traditional (arr. Benson) | 6:20 |
| Total length: | | | 42:25 |

== Personnel ==
Asleep at the Wheel

- Ray Benson – lead guitar, vocals, production
- Chris O'Connell – rhythm guitar, vocals
- Johnny Nicholas – guitar, piano, harmonica, vocals
- Lucky Oceans – pedal steel guitar
- Spencer Starnes – upright and electric basses
- Daniel J. Menudo – piano, organ
- Fran Christina – drums
- Danny Levin – fiddle, electric mandolin
- Pat "Taco" Ryan – saxophones, clarinet

Additional personnel

- Johnny Gimble – fiddle
- Andy Stein – fiddle, baritone saxophone
- Link Davis Jr. – saxophones
- Jimmie Vaughan – guitar (track 7)
- Chris York – drums (track 9)
- Chuck Flood – production
- Hugh Davies – engineering
- Greg Klinginsmith – engineering assistance
- Malcolm Harper – remote recording
- Roy Kohara – art direction
- Julie Speed – sleeve illustration
- Don Peterson – photography
