= Texas Gold =

Studio album by Asleep at the Wheel
- Released: August 1975
- Recorded: June 9 – 30, 1975
- Studios: Jack Clement Recording (Nashville, Tennessee); KAFM Studios (Dallas, Texas)
- Genres: Country; Western swing
- Length: 35:31
- Label: Capitol Records
- Producer: Tommy Allsup

Asleep at the Wheel chronology
Asleep at the Wheel (1974)	Texas Gold (1975)	Wheelin' and Dealin' (1976)

Singles from Texas Gold
- 1. "The Letter That Johnny Walker Read" Released: July 1975; 2. "Bump Bounce Boogie" Released: November 1975; 3. "Nothin' Takes the Place of You" Released: March 1976

Texas Gold is the third album by American country band Asleep at the Wheel. Produced by Tommy Allsup primarily at Jack Clement Recording Studio in Nashville, Tennessee, it was released in August 1975 as the group's first album on Capitol Records. The album was the band's first commercial success, charting on the US Billboard 200 and reaching the top ten of the Top Country Albums chart. Lead single "The Letter That Johnny Walker Read" also reached the Hot Country Songs top ten.

For the third consecutive album, Asleep at the Wheel changed record labels for Texas Gold. After former label Epic Records (which issued Asleep at the Wheel in 1974) rejected three demo recordings, the group signed with Columbia Records in June 1975. Recording took place that month, primarily (for all but two songs) at Jack Clement Studios. Texas Gold was the band's first album to feature fiddler Danny Levin and drummer Scott Hennige, and the only release with saxophonist Ed Vizard.

Texas Gold was a critical and commercial success. The band's first album to chart domestically, it peaked at number 7 on the Billboard Top Country Albums Chart and number 136 on the Billboard 200. All three of the record's singles reached the Hot Country Songs top 40, including "The Letter That Johnny Walker Read" which peaked at number 10. The album was praised by critics and received a nomination for the Grammy Award for Best Country Performance by a Duo or Group with Vocal.

== Background ==
Following the release of the band's 1974 self-titled second album, Asleep at the Wheel underwent a number of lineup changes – vocalist and drummer LeRoy Preston switched to a role of third guitarist, Scott Hennige took his place on drums, and Danny Levin (with whom the band had played occasionally in its early years) joined on fiddle. The group also added its first official saxophonist in Ed Vizard, who performed alongside guest contributors David Poe, Billy Briggs and Mike O'Dowd.

In early 1975, Asleep at the Wheel recorded demo versions of three new original songs, including "The Letter That Johnny Walker Read" and "Bump Bounce Boogie", at a local Austin, Texas studio called PSG run by Pedro Gutierrez. However, the tracks were rejected by the band's label Epic Records, who frontman Ray Benson recalled dismissed the tracks as "terrible" and "awful". This led to the group signing a deal with its third label in three years, Capitol Records, in June 1975.

Capitol allowed Asleep at the Wheel to work again with Tommy Allsup, who had previously produced the band's 1973 debut Comin' Right at Ya. After recording "Fat Boy Rag" and "Roll 'Em Floyd" at KAFM Studios in Dallas, Texas with engineer Roger Harris, tracking for the rest of the album took place at Jack Clement Studios in Nashville, Tennessee with Billy Sherrill. The album was named after Acapulco Gold, a strain of cannabis the band smoked and referred to as "Texas Gold".

Shortly after Texas Gold was completed, Asleep at the Wheel released "The Letter That Johnny Walker Read" as its first single for Capitol. Commentators praised the song and predicted that it would be a commercial success. It was the group's first song to register on the Billboard Hot Country Singles chart, peaking at number 10, and also the first on the Canadian RPM Country Singles chart, peaking at number 32. Texas Gold was released in August, followed by singles "Bump Bounce Boogie" in November and "Nothin' Takes the Place of You" in March 1976. "Bump Bounce Boogie" and "Nothin' Takes the Place of You" also reached the top 40 of the Hot Country Singles chart – the former at number 31, and the latter number 35.

== Reception ==
=== Commercial ===
Texas Gold entered the US Billboard Top Country Albums chart at number 36 on September 13, 1975. The following week, it also entered the Billboard 200 at number 187. By November, the album had peaked at number 7 on the country chart and number 136 on the main albums chart. Outside of the Billboard charts, Texas Gold reached number 158 on the Cash Box albums chart and number 4 on the publication's country albums chart, as well number 143 on the Record World albums chart and number 6 on the magazine's country albums chart.

=== Critical ===
Professional ratings
Review scores
Source	Rating
AllMusic	4.5/5 stars
Christgau's Record Guide	B+
Tom Hull – on the Web	B+

Upon its release, Texas Gold received largely positive reviews from critics. Billboard magazine praised the album for having "Much more emphasis on original material with a wider variety of music than [the band has] tackled in the past," concluding that the release was "Way above previous LPs in variety [and] skill". Particular merit was afford to Chris O'Connell's "excellent" vocal performances. Similarly, a review published in Cash Box dubbed the album "a variety of sound that can't miss".

Reviewing the album retrospectively for music website AllMusic, Stephen Thomas Erlewine credited Texas Gold for "setting [Asleep at the Wheel's] career into high gear", thanks in part to the success of lead single "The Letter That Johnny Walker Read". He praised many elements of the record, including song choice and the band's performances, before concluding his 4.5-star review by stating: "Texas Gold [was] the best record Asleep at the Wheel had made to date. Arguably, it's the best, most consistent album they ever did." Independent critic Robert Christgau awarded the album a B+ rating, higher than Asleep at the Wheel but lower than Comin' Right at Ya.

=== Accolades ===
Following the commercial and critical success of Texas Gold, Asleep at the Wheel was nominated for several industry awards. In September 1975, the group received a nomination for Vocal Group of the Year at the Country Music Association Awards. The band also received its first Grammy Award nominations at the 18th Annual Grammy Awards held in February 1976, where Texas Gold was nominated for Best Country Performance by a Duo or Group with Vocal, and the recording of Bob Wills' "Fat Boy Rag" was shortlisted in the category of Best Country Instrumental Performance.

== Track listing ==
No.	Title	Writer(s)	Length
1.	"The Letter That Johnny Walker Read"	LeRoy Preston; Ray Benson; Chris Frayne	3:15
2.	"Fat Boy Rag" (originally recorded by Bob Wills and His Texas Playboys)	Bob Wills; Junior Barnard	3:18
3.	"Runnin' After Fools"	Preston	3:16
4.	"Let Me Go Home Whiskey" (originally recorded by Amos Milburn and His Aladdin Chickenshackers)	Shifty Henry	4:08
5.	"Nothin' Takes the Place of You" (originally recorded by Toussaint McCall)	Toussaint McCall; Patrick Robinson	2:59
6.	"Roll 'Em Floyd (Interpolating Rebecca/Roll 'Em Pete)" (originally recorded by Big Joe Turner and Pete Johnson)	Big Joe Turner; Pete Johnson	5:05
7.	"Tonight the Bartender Is on the Wrong Side of the Bar"	Preston	3:10
8.	"Bump Bounce Boogie"	Preston; Benson; Jim Haber	3:13
9.	"Where No One Stands Alone" (originally recorded by the Statesmen Quartet)	Mosie Lister	2:46
10.	"Trouble in Mind" (originally recorded by Bobby Blue and the Blue Jays)	Bobby Blue	3:33
Total length:			35:31

== Personnel ==
Asleep at the Wheel

- Ray Benson – vocals (lead on tracks 6 and 10; co-lead on track 1; backing on tracks 3, 4, 7 and 9), lead guitar, rhythm guitar
- Chris O'Connell – vocals (lead on tracks 5, 8 and 9; co-lead on track 1; backing on tracks 3, 4 and 7), rhythm guitar
- LeRoy Preston – vocals (lead on tracks 3, 4 and 7; backing on tracks 1 and 9), rhythm guitar
- Lucky Oceans – pedal steel guitar
- Tony Garnier – upright, electric and tic-tac basses
- Floyd Domino – piano
- Scott Hennige – drums
- Danny Levin – fiddle
- Ed Vizard – tenor saxophone

Guest musicians

- Tommy Allsup – tic-tac bass (track 1)
- Johnny Gimble – fiddle (all except track 6), electric mandolin (track 2), banjo (track 10)
- Bill Joor – trumpet (tracks 1, 3, 5, 8 and 10)
- David Poe – alto saxophone (tracks 1, 3, 5 and 8), bass saxophone (track 3), clarinet (track 10)
- Billy Briggs – tenor saxophone (tracks 2 and 6)
- Mike O'Dowd – clarinet (track 2), alto saxophone (track 6)
- Bob Wommack – trumpet (tracks 2 and 6)
- Hurshel Wigington – backing vocals (track 9)

Additional personnel

- Tommy Allsup – production
- Billy Sherrill – engineering (all but tracks 2 and 6)
- Roger Harris – engineering (tracks 2 and 6)
- Jay Maynard – mastering
- Jack White – artwork
- Slick Lawson – photography

== Charts ==
Chart (1975)	Peak position
US Billboard 200	136
US Hot Country LPs (Billboard)	7
