= Collision Course (Asleep at the Wheel album) =

Studio album by Asleep at the Wheel
- Released: June 1978
- Recorded: October 1977 – January 1978
- Studios: Regent Sound Studios (New York City, New York)
- Genres: Country; Western swing
- Length: 38:08
- Label: Capitol
- Producer: Joel Dorn

Asleep at the Wheel chronology
The Wheel (1977)	Collision Course (1978)	Served Live (1979)

Singles from Collision Course
- 1. "Louisiana" Released: July 1978; 2. "Pine Grove Blues" Released: July 1978 (UK only); 3. "Texas Me & You" Released: November 1978

Collision Course is the sixth album by American country band Asleep at the Wheel. Produced by Joel Dorn at Regent Sound Studios in New York City, it was released in June 1978 as the group's fourth and final studio album on Capitol Records. After 1977's The Wheel featured all original material, Collision Course features only two tracks written by members of the band. The remaining recordings are covers of compositions originally by popular Western swing, Cajun and jazz artists.

Asleep at the Wheel's sixth album marks the last release by several members of the band as full-time members, including co-founder and main songwriter LeRoy Preston, pianist since the group's debut Floyd Domino, and bassist of five albums Tony Garnier. Collision Course was also the band's first release produced by Joel Dorn, the first recorded in New York, and the last studio album for Capitol; after their live debut Served Live the following year, the group would sign with MCA Records.

Collision Course was the band's fourth album to register on the US Billboard Top Country Albums chart, reaching number 46. It was also their first to chart outside of the United States, peaking at number 19 on the Canadian RPM Country Albums chart. The album was praised by critics for its mix of genres, including blues, swing, jazz, Cajun and boogie-woogie. The band's recording of Count Basie's "One O'Clock Jump" won the Grammy Award for Best Country Instrumental Performance.

== Background ==
After working with producer Tommy Allsup for all but one of their first five albums, Asleep at the Wheel recorded Collision Course with producer Joel Dorn for the first time, tracking the album at Regent Sound Studios in New York City, New York starting in late 1977. The album was completed early the next year and originally scheduled for release on May 8, 1978, although it was ultimately issued in mid–late June. "Louisiana" was released as the first single from the album in July, followed by "Texas Me & You" in November. The latter spent four weeks at the end of 1978 on the US Billboard Hot Country Singles chart, peaking at number 75.

Collision Course was recognised by commentators upon its release for displaying a more jazz-orientated sound than the band's previous releases. Shortly after the album's release, vocalist and rhythm guitarist LeRoy Preston, pianist Floyd Domino and fiddler Bill Mabry all left Asleep at the Wheel, with Johnny Nicholas joining on guitar, piano and vocals. Domino was reportedly the first to leave, following a "falling out" with frontman Ray Benson. The pianist, whose then-wife was also the manager of the group, claimed that "We had a big blowout when I left. When you battle with Ray, there are no time-outs. But there are also no hard feelings."

== Reception ==
=== Commercial ===
Collision Course did not reach the US Billboard 200, but registered at number 10 on the Bubbling Under chart. On the Top Country Albums chart it peaked at number 46, 13 places lower than 1977's The Wheel. In other publications, the album reached number 171 on the Cash Box albums chart, number 29 on the publication's country albums chart, number 174 on the Record World albums chart, and number 14 on the magazine's country albums chart. Collision Course was the band's first album to chart outside of the US, reaching number 19 on the Canadian RPM country albums chart.

=== Critical ===
Professional ratings
Review scores
Source	Rating
AllMusic	4/5 stars
Christgau's Record Guide	B−
Tom Hull – on the Web	B

Critical reviews of Collision Course were generally positive. In an uncredited review, Cash Box magazine noted that "Despite the group's name, its latest album is a wide awake effort which should help liven up everything from radio playlists to parties," praising the range of musical styles on the album and describing it as "100% fun". Similarly, Record World claimed that "The Wheel continues to progress musically with blues, jazz, country and much more with a style all their own," highlighting in particular the recordings of Randy Newman's "Louisiana", J.R. Chatwell's "Pipe Dreams" and Naomi Neville's "Ruler of My Heart". Robert Christgau awarded Collision Course a B− rating, his lowest for the band to date, which he credited to the lack of original material on the album. He described the majority of tracks as "nice, rarely more".

=== Accolades ===
Collision Course spawned Asleep at the Wheel's first Grammy Award, winning Best Country Instrumental Performance for its recording of Count Basie's "One O'Clock Jump".

== Track listing ==
No.	Title	Writer(s)	Length
1.	"Pipe Dreams" (originally recorded by J.R. Chatwell and the Texas Swing Pioneers)	James Robert Chatwell	3:10
2.	"Song of the Wanderer (Where Shall I Go?)" (originally recorded by Douglas Richardson)	Neil Moret	4:04
3.	"Pine Grove Blues" (originally recorded by Nathan Abshire and His French Accordion)	Nathan Abshire	3:27
4.	"One O'Clock Jump" (originally recorded by Count Basie)	Count Basie	4:28
5.	"Louisiana" (originally recorded by Randy Newman)	Randy Newman	5:09
6.	"Texas Me & You"	Ray Benson	3:28
7.	"Ruler of My Heart" (originally recorded by Irma Thomas)	Naomi Neville	3:45
8.	"Don't Forget the Trains"	Kevin Farrell	3:54
9.	"Ain't Nobody Here but Us Chickens" (originally recorded by Louis Jordan and His Tympany Five)	Joan Whitney	2:56
10.	"Ghost Dancer"	LeRoy Preston	3:47
Total length:			38:08

== Personnel ==
Asleep at the Wheel

- Ray Benson – lead guitar, vocals, design concept
- Chris O'Connell – rhythm guitar, percussion, vocals
- LeRoy Preston – rhythm guitar, percussion, vocals
- Lucky Oceans – pedal steel guitar
- Tony Garnier – upright and electric basses
- Floyd Domino – piano, organ
- Chris York – drums
- Danny Levin – fiddle, mandolin
- Bill Mabry – fiddle
- Link Davis Jr. – tenor and baritone saxophones, Cajun accordion, vocals
- Pat "Taco" Ryan – alto, tenor and baritone saxophones, flute, clarinet

Additional personnel

- Andy Stein – baritone saxophone, fiddle
- Delores Hall – backing vocals
- Benny Diggs – backing vocals
- Arthur Lee Freeman – backing vocals
- Phillip Ballou – backing vocals
- Joel Dorn – production
- Kathy Tufaro – production assistance
- Vince McGarry – engineering, mixing
- Michael Priest – artwork, design
- Guy Juke – artwork colouring

== Charts ==
Chart (1978)	Peak position
Canadian Country Albums (RPM)	19
US Bubbling Under Albums (Billboard)	10
US Hot Country LPs (Billboard)	46
