= The Wheel Keeps on Rollin' =

Studio album by Asleep at the Wheel
- Released: November 21, 1995
- Recorded: March 1995
- Studios: Bismeaux (Austin); Austin (Austin); Soundshop (Nashville); Music Row (Nashville)
- Genres: Country; Western swing
- Length: 36:20
- Label: Capitol Nashville
- Producers: Andy Byrd; Ray Benson

Asleep at the Wheel chronology
Tribute to the Music of Bob Wills and the Texas Playboys (1993)	The Wheel Keeps on Rollin' (1995)	Back to the Future Now: Live at Arizona Charlie's, Las Vegas (1997)

Singles from The Wheel Keeps on Rollin'
- 1. "Lay Down Sally" Released: January 1996

The Wheel Keeps on Rollin' is the 13th studio album by American country band Asleep at the Wheel. Recorded at studios in Austin, Texas, and Nashville, Tennessee, it was produced by Andy Byrd with the band's frontman Ray Benson and released on November 21, 1995, by Capitol Nashville. The album was produced to mark the 25th anniversary of the group's 1970 inception, and was its first collection of new original studio material since the release of Keepin' Me Up Nights in 1990.

Following the critical and commercial success of Tribute to the Music of Bob Wills and the Texas Playboys in 1993, Asleep at the Wheel recorded The Wheel Keeps on Rollin' for Capitol in 1995. Primarily made up of original material, it features three cover versions including a recording of Eric Clapton's "Lay Down Sally", which was released as a single in January 1996. Guest performers on the album include steel guitarist Lloyd Maines, bassist Dave Pomeroy and drummer Chad Cromwell.

The Wheel Keeps on Rollin' received positive reviews from the majority of critics, many of whom praised its mix of "classic" Western swing and more radio-friendly country music. Some commentators, however, criticised's Benson vocal performances on the record. The album did not chart in the US, but was the band's first to reach the top ten of the RPM Country Albums chart in Canada when it peaked at number 3 in 1996. It was the band's last studio album to feature pianist Tim Alexander.

== Background ==
The Wheel Keeps on Rollin' was produced to mark 25 years since Asleep at the Wheel's formation. Reflecting on the anniversary, the band's frontman Ray Benson stated that "Milestones are a funny thing. They give you a chance to pause and reflect," describing the album as the first of potentially "plenty more celebrations". Benson went on to claim that the 1995 release was potentially more radio-friendly than its predecessors, noting that "We have gotten a reputation as a nonradio band, but we've had some hits. We can make radio records, and I really wanted to, because I love radio records. So I'm jazzed about this album."

Following the critical and commercial success of 1993's Tribute to the Music of Bob Wills and the Texas Playboys, Benson and Asleep at the Wheel deliberately decided to focus more on modern radio-friendly country music than old-school Western swing for The Wheel Keeps on Rollin', although the frontman admits that pressure from record label Capitol Records also played a part in this change. Speaking to Texas Monthly reporter Gary Cartwright about the decision to record Eric Clapton's "Lay Down Sally", Benson admitted that "Frankly, I put it on [the album] hoping it would get a lot of radio time ... We still have to make a living."

A music video for "Lay Down Sally", directed by Mark Shuman, was released in October 1995. The single followed in January 1996. It did not chart in the US, but was the band's first song to reach the top ten of the Canadian RPM Country Tracks chart, peaking at number 3 in April. To promote the album, the band worked with an Austin, Texas-based company called Aztec to produce an "interactive CD-ROM" containing the album, the "Lay Down Sally" video, the electronic press kit and other content; speaking about the release, Benson commented that "I think it's revolutionary. I've always wanted to do something like this."

== Reception ==
=== Commercial ===
The Wheel Keeps on Rollin' was Asleep at the Wheel's first studio album since 1985's Pasture Prime not to register on the US Billboard Top Country Albums chart. Speaking about its lack of commercial success, frontman Ray Benson complained that "It's just our bad luck that the album came out at the same time as Garth Brooks' Fresh Horses album and the Beatles' new album [Anthology 1]". The album was popular in Canada, however, spending several weeks on the RPM Country Albums Chart in early 1996 and peaking at number 3, the highest position achieved by the group.

=== Critical ===
Professional ratings
Review scores
Source	Rating
AllMusic	3/5 stars

Media response to The Wheel Keeps on Rollin' was mixed. Reviewing the album for Cash Box magazine, Wendy Newcomer hailed it as "an amazingly fresh batch of new material that keeps jazzy country swing alive," praising original recordings "Meanwhile, Back at the Ranch", "She Came to Dance" and "The Wheel Keeps on Rollin'" as "outstanding". Entertainment Weekly contributor Alanna Nash claimed that the album "runs the gamut from two-steppin', line-dancin' fare to '40s-style big-band romps," describing the collection as "mighty fine". The San Francisco Examiner suggested upon the album's release that "the band is on an unstoppable roll".

AllMusic editor Stephen Thomas Erlewine published a more balanced retrospective review of the album for the website, noting that "It might not have the conceptual power of their previous Tribute to the Music of Bob Wills and the Texas Playboys, nor is it as raw their earliest recordings, but it is an album that will satisfy their dedicated fans." On a similar note, the St. Louis Post-Dispatch went as far as to claim that The Wheel Keeps on Rollin' "can't follow" the Bob Wills tribute, criticising Benson as a "subpar singer". Dan Kuchar of Country Standard Time also highlighted the frontman's "lacklustre vocals", but praised the backing vocals and instrumentation (especially of steel guitarist Cindy Cashdollar) as "superb".

=== Accolades ===
Asleep at the Wheel won its sixth Grammy Award, and fifth for Best Country Instrumental Performance, for the song "Hightower" at the 38th Annual Grammy Awards.

== Track listing ==
No.	Title	Writer(s)	Length
1.	"Meanwhile, Back at the Ranch"	Pat Buchanan; Jim Robinson	3:03
2.	"That's How the West Was Swung" (originally recorded by Roy and the Kentucky Headhunters)	Troy Seals; Gene Pistilli	2:41
3.	"Lay Down Sally" (originally recorded by Eric Clapton)	Eric Clapton; Marcy Levy; George Terry	3:19
4.	"The Wheel Keeps on Rollin'"	Ray Benson	3:35
5.	"Hightower"	Benson; Tim Alexander	4:10
6.	"If I Could"	Tim Carroll	2:21
7.	"Smoke! Smoke! Smoke! (That Cigarette)" (originally recorded by Tex Williams)	Tex Williams; Merle Travis	3:12
8.	"Rockin' Rodeo"	Benson	3:02
9.	"She Came to Dance"	Benson	3:18
10.	"In My Dreams"	Fred Koller; Al Anderson	3:08
11.	"Lay Down Sally" (extended mix)	Clapton; Levy; Terry	4:31
Total length:			36:20

== Personnel ==
Asleep at the Wheel

- Ray Benson – vocals, electric and acoustic guitars, production
- Cindy Cashdollar – lap steel and slide guitars, dobro
- David Miller – bass, backing vocals
- Tim Alexander – piano, organ, keyboards, backing vocals
- David Sanger – drums
- Barbara Lamb – fiddle
- Michael Francis – saxophone, clarinet

Additional personnel

- Bill Vorndick – engineering
- David Gratz – engineering
- Frank Campbell – engineering
- John Dickson – engineering
- Andy Byrd – production, mixing (all except tracks 5 and 7)
- Larry Seyer – engineering, mixing (tracks 5 and 7), guitar, synthesizers, bass

Guest musicians

- J.T. Corenflos – electric guitar
- B. James Lowry – acoustic guitar
- Lloyd Maines – pedal steel guitar
- Dave Pomeroy – bass
- Spencer Starnes – upright bass
- Chad Cromwell – drums
- John Molo – drums
- Danny Levin – fiddle
- Chad Hudson – backing vocals (lead on track 6)
- Chris O'Connell – backing vocals
- Ernie Gammage – backing vocals
- Johnny Gimble – fiddle and electric mandolin (track 5)
- Béla Fleck – banjo (track 5)
- Albert Lee – electric guitar (track 8)

== Charts ==
Chart (1996)	Peak position
Canadian Country Albums (RPM)	3
