= Greatest Hits: Live & Kickin' =

Live album by Asleep at the Wheel
- Released: March 24, 1992
- Recorded: August 9, 1991
- Venue: Auditorium Shores (Austin, Texas)
- Genre: Country; Western swing
- Length: 42:27
- Label: Arista
- Producer: Ray Benson

Asleep at the Wheel chronology
Keepin' Me Up Nights (1990)	Greatest Hits: Live & Kickin' (1992)	Tribute to the Music of Bob Wills and the Texas Playboys (1993)

Singles from Greatest Hits: Live & Kickin'
- 1. "(Get Your Kicks on) Route 66" Released: March 1992

Greatest Hits: Live & Kickin' is the second live album by American country band Asleep at the Wheel. Recorded on August 9, 1991, at the 30th annual Austin Aqua Festival, which was held at Auditorium Shores in Austin, Texas, it was produced by the band's frontman Ray Benson and released on March 24, 1992, as the group's second and final album on Arista Records. The album was supported by the release of "(Get Your Kicks on) Route 66" as its one single.

Following the release of Asleep at the Wheel's eleventh studio album Keepin' Me Up Nights in 1990, fiddler Larry Franklin was replaced by Ricky Turpin, who made his debut for the group on Live & Kickin' (Franklin featured as a guest). The album was the band's last to feature bassist Jon Mitchell, who was replaced by David Miller shortly after its release.

== Production ==
Greatest Hits: Live & Kickin' documents Asleep at the Wheel's August 9, 1991, performance at the 30th annual Austin Aqua Festival, held at Auditorium Shores in Austin, Texas. The album was released by Arista Records on March 24, 1992. The recording of Bobby Troup's "(Get Your Kicks on) Route 66" was issued as its sole single the same month. The single's release coincided with the 66th anniversary of the titular U.S. Route 66. The band celebrated the anniversary with a run of shows at ten cities on the road's route in May 1992.

The album was Asleep at the Wheel's first release to feature fiddler Ricky Turpin, who was chosen by his predecessor Larry Franklin to take his place when he left the band. It is also the last to feature bassist Jon Mitchell and the last to feature steel guitarist John Ely as an official member; within a few months of the album's release, the departed pair had been replaced by David Miller and Cindy Cashdollar, respectively.

Former pianist Floyd Domino makes a guest appearance on the recording of "Jambalaya".

== Reception ==
Reviewing the album for AllMusic, writer Stephen Thomas Erlewine submitted that "Greatest Hits... Live & Kickin' showcases Asleep at the Wheel running through their best-known material in a kinetic live setting. It's a great introduction to Asleep at the Wheel – they are never better than they are in concert, and the selection brings out the best in the musicians." "Black and White Rag", issued as the B-side to "(Get Your Kicks on) Route 66", was nominated for the Grammy Award for Best Country Instrumental Performance at the 35th Annual Grammy Awards, three years after the studio version of the song's nomination for the same award.

== Track listing ==
No.	Title	Writer(s)	Length
1.	"(Get Your Kicks on) Route 66"	Bobby Troup	4:11
2.	"Miles and Miles of Texas"	Tommy Camfield; Diane Johnston	3:57
3.	"Take Me Back to Tulsa/Stay All Night"	Bob Wills; Tommy Duncan	5:22
4.	"Black and White Rag"	Ray Benson	3:32
5.	"Jambalaya"	Hank Williams; Moon Mullican	4:53
6.	"Ain't Nobody Here but Us Chickens"	Joan Whitney; Alex Kramer	3:28
7.	"Dance with Who Brung You"	Benson	3:42
8.	"Choo Choo Ch'Boogie"	Milt Gabler; Vaughn Horton; Denver Darling	5:15
9.	"House of Blue Lights"	Don Raye; Freddie Slack	4:23
10.	"Beat Me Daddy (Eight to the Bar)"	Raye; Hughie Prince; Ray McKinley	3:39
Total length:			42:27

== Personnel ==
Asleep at the Wheel

- Ray Benson – vocals, guitar, production, mixing
- John Ely – Hawaiian steel guitar
- Jon Mitchell – bass, vocals
- Tim Alexander – piano, accordion, vocals
- David Sanger – drums
- Ricky Turpin – fiddle
- Michael Francis – saxophone

Additional personnel

- Larry Franklin – fiddle, vocals
- Floyd Domino – piano (track 5)
- Greg Klinginsmith – engineering
- Malcolm Harper – engineering
- Brent Campbell – engineering assistance
- Gordon Garrison – engineering assistance
- Larry Seyer – mixing
