= Pasture Prime =

Studio album by Asleep at the Wheel
- Released: April 1985
- Recorded: 1981–1984
- Studio: Austin Recording, Austin, Texas; Bee Creek, Spicewood, Texas; Pedernales Recording, Spicewood, Texas
- Genre: Western swing
- Length: 40:51
- Label: Demon; Stony Plain
- Producer: Ray Benson; Willie Nelson

Asleep at the Wheel chronology
| Framed (1980) | Pasture Prime (1985) | 10 (1987) |

Alternative cover

Pasture Prime is the eighth studio album by American western swing band Asleep at the Wheel. Produced by Ray Benson at Austin Recording and Bee Creek Studios in Austin, Texas, and by Benson and Willie Nelson at Pedernales Recording Studio in Briarcliff, Texas, it was released in April 1985 by Demon Music Group in the UK and Stony Plain Records in Canada. The album was later repackaged in the US with three fewer tracks and released under the title Asleep at the Wheel.

Following the release of Framed in 1980, Asleep at the Wheel left MCA Records and underwent a series of personnel changes (Benson estimated over 30 members were present at various times from 1980 to 1985). Recording for Pasture Prime took place over the course of three years, beginning with sessions at Nelson's Briarcliff studio in 1981. In 1985, the album received its initial limited release, before Dot Records issued the self-titled version in the United States later in the year.

Despite its long and disjointed production, Pasture Prime received largely positive reviews from music critics, who praised its return to the group's classic Western swing style following more experimentation in recent years. It has been highlighted by commentators as one of the band's best releases, while Benson has credited it for "rebounding" Asleep at the Wheel's career after several years of dwindling popularity and financial issues. The album did not register on the US charts.

== Background ==
After suffering the departure of many key band members between 1978 and 1980, Asleep at the Wheel faced dwindling popularity and mounting financial problems in the early 1980s. The band was reportedly $180,000 in debt to the Internal Revenue Service in 1980 following the release of its only album for MCA Records, Framed. Bandleader Ray Benson recalls that "From 1981 to 1985, we didn't have a record deal," suggesting the band faced difficulty securing a deal due to the increasing popularity of disco, adding that "Traditional country was making a comeback, but they [labels] didn't consider us traditional country ... we were living hand-to-mouth, as far as the band was concerned." During what Benson described as "the dark age of disco", the band played much smaller venues and recorded music for TV commercials.

During this period of uncertainty and low popularity, the group also went through a large number of lineup changes. Benson recalled in a 1998 interview for the reissue of Pasture Prime that "Our personnel shifted rather dramatically ... We've had over 80 people in the band, and I think almost 35 or 40 of them were in those five years [1980 to 1985]." By the time Pasture Prime was released in 1985, only Benson and co-lead vocalist Chris O'Connell remained from the Framed incarnation.

== Production ==
Recording for Asleep at the Wheel's eighth album began in 1981 at Willie Nelson's Pedernales Recording Studio in Briarcliff, Texas, initially under the working title The Road Will Hold Me Tonight, with the plan to release it on Nelson's own label Lone Star Records. Speaking about the sessions, frontman Ray Benson recalled that "Willie built himself a recording studio ... we were pals and everything and he said, 'Just come on over and record.' And he opened the studio to us ... So we would go in there when Willie was done recording ... we spent hundreds of hours out there ... So we were broke and out of luck, but ... Willie was just so generous."

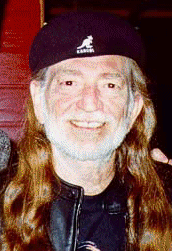
Willie Nelson co-produced four tracks at his own Pedernales Recording Studio, as well as writing and featuring on one.

Four tracks from the sessions produced by Benson and Nelson were included on the final album, featuring a lineup of Benson on lead guitar and vocals, Chris O'Connell on rhythm guitar and vocals, Wally Murphy on pedal steel guitar, Spencer Starnes on bass, Falkner Evans on piano, Steve Schwelling on drums and Paul Anastasio on fiddle; guests included former band member Floyd Domino on piano, Johnny Gimble on fiddle, and Bob Myers on trumpet and saxophone. Nelson featured on his own composition "Write Your Own Song", which details "every musician's frustrations with how label people seem to think it's so easy to write hits".

Additional recording for Pasture Prime took place in 1983 and 1984. Seven tracks on the album were produced at Austin Recording Studio, with a lineup of Benson, O'Connell, Murphy, Evans, bassist Tom Anastasio, drummer Richard Hormachea and saxophonist Michael Francis. The Roomful of Blues horn section is featured on the recording of Big Joe Turner's "Switchin' in the Kitchen". The final two songs were tracked at Spencer Starnes' Bee Creek Studios with lap steel guitarist Junior Brown, bassist Anastasio, pianist Tim Alexander, drummer Mike Grammar, fiddler Larry Franklin and saxophonist Francis.

Continuing to talk about the album's production process, Benson explained that "I finally got all the stuff [from the Pedernales sessions] and I said, 'Gosh, we got an album here.' And then this guy came along – actually, it's one of the Tysons from the Tyson chicken empire – and said he wanted to make a record on us ... and we wound up with a whole record. So I took the cuts from the stuff we'd been doing for two years, combined them with that, and made Pasture Prime."

== Release ==
Pasture Prime was initially issued in April 1985 as a limited release in the United Kingdom (by Demon Records) and Canada (by Stony Plain Records). A release in the United States followed in late-October, after Asleep at the Wheel signed as one of the first acts on Dot Records following its acquisition by the band's former label MCA. Ray Benson credited the securing of the US distribution deal to the release of the album internationally first, commenting that "Europe's the only place to get anything done. We got the MCA deal because of interest overseas." For the US release, Dot removed three tracks ("The Chick's Too Young to Fry", "Big Beaver" and "The Natural Thing to Do") and retitled it Asleep at the Wheel.

== Reception ==
Professional ratings
Review scores
| Source | Rating |
|---|---|
| AllMusic (Pasture Prime) | 4/5 stars |
| AllMusic (Asleep at the Wheel) | 4.5/5 stars |

Critical reviews of Pasture Prime and Asleep at the Wheel were generally positive. Reviewing the 1998 reissue of the original Pasture Prime album for AllMusic, Anne Wickstrom described it as a collection of "classic Western swing". An uncredited review of the US version on the website claimed that Asleep at the Wheel is "a disc that most fans agree is among [the band's] best", praising the "expert takes" on popular compositions within the genres of country and swing music.

Pasture Prime has often been hailed as one of the most important releases by Asleep at the Wheel, and credited for rejuvenating the band's career. In the interview featured on later reissues of the album, Ray Benson recalls that "Pasture Prime is a very special album, because it contains almost three years of recording ... After that, it just took off. All of a sudden, the career rebounded for whatever reason. I guess if you hang in there long enough, they either kick you out or bring you back." In a later interview, he dubbed it the band's "comeback" release, a term also used by Wickstrom in her AllMusic review.

== Track listing ==
Pasture Prime original pressings
| No. | Title | Writer(s) | Length |
|---|---|---|---|
| 1. | "Across the Alley from the Alamo" (originally recorded by Woody Herman and the Four Chips) | Joe Greene | 2:50 |
| 2. | "Switchin' in the Kitchen" (originally recorded by Big Joe Turner) | Rudolph Moore | 4:09 |
| 3. | "Write Your Own Song" | Willie Nelson | 2:32 |
| 4. | "Cotton Eyed Joe" (originally recorded by Fiddlin' John Carson) | Traditional (arr. Benson, Johnny Gimble) | 2:16 |
| 5. | "Baby" | Harvey Thomas Young; Danny Levin | 3:38 |
| 6. | "Shorty" | Benson | 3:37 |
| 7. | "The Chick's Too Young to Fry" (originally recorded by Louis Jordan and the Tympany Five) | Tommy Edwards; Jimmy Hilliard | 2:12 |
| 8. | "Big Beaver" (originally recorded by Bob Wills and His Texas Playboys) | Bob Wills | 3:11 |
| 9. | "This Is the Way We Make a Broken Heart" | John Hiatt | 3:16 |
| 10. | "Deep Water" (originally recorded by Bob Wills and His Texas Playboys) | Fred Rose | 3:01 |
| 11. | "The Natural Thing to Do" (originally recorded by Al Cohn) | Al Cohn | 3:53 |
| 12. | "Liar's Moon" | Benson | 3:20 |
| 13. | "That's Your Red Wagon" (originally recorded by the Andrews Sisters and Vic Schoen) | Richard M. Jones; Gene de Paul; Don Raye | 2:56 |
| Total length: | | | 40:51 |

Pasture Prime 1998 reissue
| No. | Title | Length |
|---|---|---|
| 14. | "Interview with Ray Benson" | 17:48 |
| Total length: | | 58:39 |

Asleep at the Wheel
| No. | Title | Writer(s) | Length |
|---|---|---|---|
| 1. | "Cotton Eyed Joe" | Traditional (arr. Benson, Gimble) | 2:25 |
| 2. | "This Is the Way We Make a Broken Heart" | Hiatt | 3:30 |
| 3. | "Across the Alley from the Alamo" (originally recorded by Woody Herman and the Four Chips) | Greene | 2:58 |
| 4. | "Switchin' in the Kitchen" (originally recorded by Big Joe Turner) | Moore | 4:19 |
| 5. | "Deep Water" (originally recorded by Bob Wills and His Texas Playboys) | Rose | 3:09 |
| 6. | "Write Your Own Song" | Nelson | 2:40 |
| 7. | "That's Your Red Wagon" (originally recorded by the Andrews Sisters and Vic Schoen) | Jones; de Paul; Raye | 3:03 |
| 8. | "Baby" | Young; Levin | 3:58 |
| 9. | "Liar's Moon" | Benson | 3:37 |
| 10. | "Shorty" | Benson | 3:57 |
| Total length: | | | 33:36 |

== Personnel ==
Current and former band members
- Ray Benson – lead guitar (all except track 5), rhythm guitar (tracks 1, 2, 4, 5 and 9–13), vocals (tracks 1–4, 6, 7, 9, 10, 12 and 13), production (all tracks), arrangements (tracks 4 and 5), CD remastering
- Chris O'Connell – rhythm guitar (tracks 1, 2, 4, 5 and 8–13), lead guitar (track 2), vocals (tracks 1, 2, 4, 5, 9, 11 and 13), backing vocals (track 6)
- Wally Murphy – pedal steel guitar (all except tracks 11 and 13)
- Junior Brown – lap steel guitar (tracks 11 and 13)
- Tom Anastasio – bass (tracks 1, 2, 4, 5 and 9–13)
- Spencer Starnes – bass (tracks 3 and 6–8), horn arrangements (track 6)
- Falkner Evans – piano (tracks 1, 2 and 7–9)
- Floyd Domino – piano (tracks 3–5, 10 and 12)
- Tim Alexander – piano (tracks 11 and 13)
- Richard Hormachea – drums (tracks 1, 2, 4, 5, 9, 10 and 12)
- Steve Schwelling – drums (tracks 3 and 6–8)
- Mike Grammar – drums (tracks 11 and 13)
- Paul Anastasio – fiddle (tracks 3 and 6–8)
- Larry Franklin – fiddle (tracks 11 and 13)
- Michael Francis – saxophone (tracks 1, 2, 5–10, 12 and 13)
- Danny Levin – strings (track 5)
- Maryann Price – backing vocals (track 6)

Guest musicians

- Willie Nelson – guitar and vocals (track 3), production (tracks 3 and 6–8)
- Johnny Gimble – fiddle (all except tracks 2 and 10), electric mandolin (tracks 1, 4, 5 and 8), banjo (track 4), arrangements (track 4)
- Bob Myers – trumpet (tracks 7, 8 and 10), saxophone (tracks 7 and 10)
- Rich Lataille – saxophone (track 2)
- Greg Piccolo – saxophone (track 2)
- Doug Schlecht – saxophone (track 2)
- Bob Enos – trumpet (track 2)
- Zolman "Porky" Cohen – trombone (track 2)
- Mike Watkins – lead guitar (track 5)
- Kayelaine Ryan – strings (track 5)
- Dan Fletcher – strings (track 5)
- Kerri Lay – strings (track 5)
- Bill Ginn – piano (track 6), string arrangements (track 5)
- Andy Murphy – backing vocals (track 6)

Additional personnel

- Larry Lawrence – engineering (tracks 1, 2, 4, 5, 9, 10 and 12)
- Perry Lancaster – engineering assistance (tracks 1, 2, 4, 5, 9, 10 and 12)
- Curtis Drake – engineering assistance (tracks 1, 2, 4, 5, 9, 10 and 12)
- Larry Greenhill – engineering (tracks 3 and 6–8)
- Bobby Arnold – engineering (tracks 3 and 6–8)
- Jim Finney – engineering (tracks 11 and 13)
- Paul Harrison – engineering (tracks 11 and 13)
- Jay Hopkings – engineering (tracks 11 and 13)
- Frank Campbell – CD remastering
- Allen Crider – CD editing
- Holger Petersen – interview, CD production
- Rob Storeshaw – CD cover design
