= Chloe Feoranzo =

American jazz musician (born 1992)

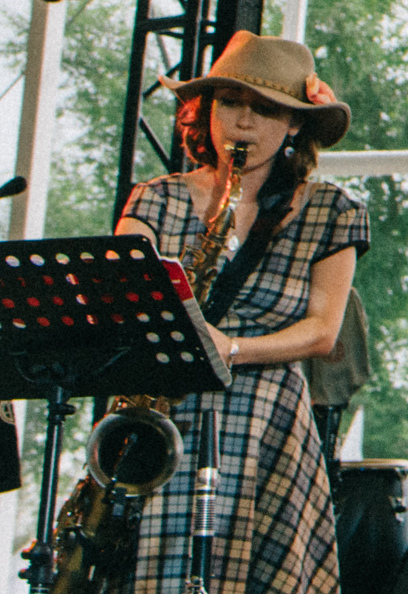
Feoranzo performing as part of Asleep at the Wheel in 2019

Chloe Feoranzo (born 1992) is an American clarinetist, saxophonist, and vocalist who has been performing professionally since the age of 15. Born in Rhode Island, she grew up in San Diego, where she played in youth orchestras and pit bands, along with swing and dixieland bands and playing as a guest artist at numerous festivals across Southern California. She made her debut at the Mission Valley music fete in 2005. As a teenage musician she studied with jazz sax legend Charles McPherson and attended the annual UC San Diego Jazz Camp. In 2007, she became the San Diego Jazz Fest & Swing Extravaganza's first youth guest artist.

After relocating to St. Louis for college she collaborated with several groups in the city's traditional jazz scene including the Sidney Street Shakers and Miss Jubilee and the Humdingers. It was through these connections that she came to join Pokey LaFarge's touring band.

In 2016, she completed a three-year tour with Pokey LaFarge, leaving on amicable terms. The band toured many countries and appeared on various shows such as the Late Show with David Letterman, The Marty Stuart Show, A Prairie Home Companion and the Grand Ole Opry. She now resides in New Orleans as a freelance musician.

Since 2016 she has been a member of the all-female Shake 'Em Up Jazz Band. The group is based in New Orleans and has produced three albums. They toured internationally in 2018. She continues to perform with a number of other groups and has appeared on more than 40 albums.

On December 29, 2016, she was featured in the Postmodern Jukebox cover of "No Surprises" by Radiohead.

On October 12, 2017, she was featured on Postmodern Jukebox's cover of the Foo Fighters song, "My Hero".

On September 20, 2019, she was featured on Postmodern Jukebox's cover of the Billy Idol song, "Dancing With Myself".

On October 10, 2023, she was featured on Postmodern Jukebox's cover of the Depeche Mode song, "Enjoy the Silence".
