= Willie and the Wheel =

Studio album by Willie Nelson and Asleep at the Wheel
- Released: February 3, 2009
- Genre: Country, Americana, Western swing
- Label: Bismeaux
- Producer: Ray Benson

Willie Nelson and Asleep at the Wheel chronology
Playlist: The Very Best of Willie Nelson (2008)	Willie and the Wheel (2009)	Naked Willie (2009)

Professional ratings
Aggregate scores
Source	Rating
Metacritic	75/100
Review scores
Source	Rating
AllMusic	3/5 stars
God Is in the TV	3.5/5
MSN Music (Consumer Guide)	A
PopMatters	5/10
Rolling Stone	4/5 stars
Tom Hull – on the Web	A
Uncut	8/10

Willie and the Wheel is an album from American country music artists Willie Nelson and Asleep at the Wheel. It was released on February 3, 2009, on Bismeaux Records and was nominated for the Grammy Award for Best Americana Album.

== Track list ==
1. "Hesitation Blues" - 2:47
2. "Sweet Jennie Lee" (Walter Donaldson) - 3:01
3. "Fan It" (Frankie Jaxson, Dan Howell) - 2:46
4. "I Ain't Gonna Give Nobody None o' This Jelly Roll" (Spencer Williams, Clarence Williams) - 3:11
5. "Oh! You Pretty Woman" - 2:50
6. "Bring it on Down to My House" - 3:29
7. "Right or Wrong" (Arthur Sizemore, Haven Gillespie, Paul Biese) - 3:10
8. "Corrine, Corrina" - 3:17
9. "I'm Sittin' on Top of the World" - 4:45
10. "Shame on You" (Spade Cooley) - 2:59
11. "South" (Bennie Moten, Thamon Hayes) - 3:39
  - (with Paul Shaffer and Vince Gill)
12. "Won't You Ride in My Little Red Wagon" (Rex Griffin) - 3:39
13. "I'll Have Somebody Else" (Bob Wills) - 3:31

Tracks 1, 5, 6, 8 and 9 are credited as traditional songs, arranged for this recording by Ray Benson. Track 13 appears on the deluxe version of the album which also includes unique postcards for each track.

== Chart performance ==
Chart (2009)	Peak position
U.S. Billboard Top Country Albums	13
U.S. Billboard 200	90
U.S. Billboard Top Independent Albums	6

== Personnel ==
- Dave Alexander – Trumpet
- William Armstrong – Assistant Engineer
- Ray Benson – Acoustic & Electric Guitar, Arranger, Vocals, Producer, Liner Notes, Art Direction, Mixing
- Don Cobb – Mastering
- Eric Conn – Mastering
- Sarah Dodds – Design
- Shauna Dodds – Design
- Floyd Domino – Piano
- Jonathan Doyle – Clarinet
- Mindy Espy Reyes – Product Manager
- Vince Gill – Electric Guitar
- Boo Macleod – Engineer
- Elizabeth McQueen – Vocals
- M.J. Mendell – Assistant Producer
- David Earl Miller – Bass
- Michael Mordecai – Trombone
- Willie Nelson – Vocals
- Adam Odor – Engineer, Mixing
- Lisa Pollard – Photography
- Vance Powell – Engineer
- Dick Reeves – Art Direction, Design
- Eddie Rivers – Steel Guitar
- Jason Roberts – Fiddle, Mandolin, Vocals
- David Sanger – Drums
- Peter Schwarz – Associate Producer
- Sam Seifert – Acoustic Guitar, Engineer, Mixing
- Paul Shaffer – Piano
- Dan Skarbek – Assistant Producer
- Kevin C. Smith – Bass
- Jerry Wexler – Executive Producer
- John Michael Whitby – Piano
- John "Sly" Wilson – Design
