= The Letter That Johnny Walker Read =

Single by Asleep at the Wheel

from the album Texas Gold
- Released: August 4, 1975
- Studio: Jack Clement Recording (Nashville, Tennessee)
- Genre: Country swing
- Length: 3:15
- Songwriter(s): Ray Benson; LeRoy Preston; Chris Frayne
- Producer(s): Tommy Allsup

Asleep at the Wheel singles chronology
"Choo Choo Ch'Boogie" (1974)	"The Letter That Johnny Walker Read" (1975)	"Bump, Bounce, Boogie" (1975)

"The Letter That Johnny Walker Read" is a song written and recorded by the American country music band Asleep at the Wheel. It was released in August 1975 as the lead single from their album Texas Gold. The song's title is a reference to the Johnnie Walker "Red Label" Scotch whisky. It was their highest-charting single, reaching number 10 on the Hot Country Singles charts in 1975. It was featured on the country radio station K-Rose in the 2004 cross-platform video game Grand Theft Auto: San Andreas. The band re-recorded the song with Lee Ann Womack for their 2021 album Half a Hundred Years.

== Chart performance ==
Chart (1975)	Peak position
U.S. Billboard Hot Country Singles	10
Canadian RPM Country Tracks	32
