= Comin' Right at Ya =

Studio album by Asleep at the Wheel
- Released: March 1973
- Recorded: January 1973
- Studio: Mercury Custom Studios (Nashville, Tennessee)
- Genre: Western swing
- Length: 37:12
- Label: United Artists
- Producer: Tommy Allsup

Asleep at the Wheel chronology
Comin' Right at Ya (1973)	Asleep at the Wheel (1974)

Singles from Comin' Right at Ya
- 1. "Take Me Back to Tulsa" Released: July 1973; 2. "Drivin' Nails in My Coffin" Released: October 1973

Comin' Right at Ya is the debut album by American western swing band Asleep at the Wheel. Produced by Tommy Allsup at Mercury Custom Studios in Nashville, Tennessee, it was released in March 1973 as the group's only album on United Artists Records. The album features a variety of traditional and original compositions, including recordings of songs originally by Bob Wills, Hank Williams and Geoff Mack. Most of the original tracks on the album were written by drummer and vocalist LeRoy Preston.

Asleep at the Wheel's debut was the only album to feature the first recording lineup of the group, which included Preston alongside vocalist and lead guitarist Ray Benson, vocalist and rhythm guitarist Chris O'Connell, vocalist and bassist Gene Dobkin, steel guitarist Lucky Oceans and pianist Floyd Domino. At the time of its recording, the band did not have a full-time fiddler in the band, so Comin' Right at Ya features guest contributions from Johnny Gimble, Andy Stein and Buddy Spicher on the instrument.

Comin' Right at Ya failed to register on the US or any international music charts. However, it was received positively by critics, with reviewers praising its versatility and authenticity considering the young age of the band. The album has since been recognised by a number of commentators as one of the best releases in Asleep at the Wheel's career. Two songs on the record were released as singles: Wills' "Take Me Back to Tulsa" in July 1973 and Jerry Irby's "Drivin' Nails in My Coffin" in October 1973.

== Background ==
After performing for almost three years without a record deal, Asleep at the Wheel signed with United Artists Records in the fall of 1972. The impetus for the deal was credited in part to Van Morrison, who mentioned the group favorably in an interview with Rolling Stone, which led to interest from multiple labels. Despite being based in Oakland, California at the time, the band insisted that they be allowed to record their debut album in Nashville, Tennessee, inspired by Willie Nelson's recordings.

Recording for the album took place at Nashville's Mercury Custom Recording Studios in January 1973. The sessions were produced by Tommy Allsup, who was brought in on the recommendation of fiddler Buddy Spicher, a guest performer on the album's first recording, "Take Me Back to Tulsa". As the band did not yet have a full-time fiddler, Comin' Right at Ya also featured contributions from Johnny Gimble and Andy Stein, the latter of whom had been touring part-time with the group since 1971.

Comin' Right at Ya was released in March 1973. Two singles were issued from the album: a recording of Bob Wills and His Texas Playboys' "Take Me Back to Tulsa" featuring Spicher, and a recording of Jerry Irby's "Drivin' Nails in My Coffin" featuring Gimble. Despite receiving several positive reviews from music critics after the release of the album, neither Comin' Right at Ya nor either of its singles managed to register on the national record charts, which led to United Artists dropping the band.

== Reception ==
Professional ratings
Review scores
Source	Rating
AllMusic	4.5/5 stars
Christgau's Record Guide	A−
The Rolling Stone Record Guide	3/5 stars
Tom Hull – on the Web	A−

Critical response to Comin' Right at Ya was largely positive, with many commentators hailing it as a strong debut release. Writing in Record Mirror, Tony Byworth described the album as "an auspicious and highly entertaining recording debut in which this six piece outfit really come to grips with the honest to goodness country sounds of the fifties and early sixties." Similarly, a short uncredited review in Billboard magazine stated: "San Francisco's hottest new neo-hayseed rockers join the Commander Cody/Dan Hicks sweepstake with delightfully wacked-out flair." The Dispatch, a newspaper based in Moline, Illinois, wrote about the record that "it's unbelievable that a group so young can be so talented, they sound like they've been around for years," calling it "a nearly flawless piece of vinyl".

Several reviews welcomed Asleep at the Wheel's debut as an exciting development in country and western music. Byworth suggested that the band was "injecting the music with some good old basic enthusiasm and excitement". Cash Box was also positive of the potential impact of the album, suggesting that "Asleep At The Wheel looks to become an important force in the revitalization of western music". Music critic Robert Christgau spoke further about the album within the genre of Western swing specifically, writing that "flatness is of the essence in Western swing, and the sly singing and positively underhanded songwriting here exploit it brilliantly." In another retrospective review, for the website AllMusic, Stephen Thomas Erlewine claimed that Comin' Right at Ya saw the group "re-creating the sound of pure country at a time when it often wasn't heard", calling it "one of their best" releases.

Of the few criticisms levelled at Comin' Right at Ya, among the most common was its attempt at humorous material. The Arizona Republic published a review which stated that "Unlike Commander Cody, who seems to parody much of country and western music, Asleep at the Wheel seem dead serious in pushing these old songs, and while they do swing, most hard rock enthusiasts may find them a bit too corny." The Times Herald drew the same comparison, claiming that "They are not as funny or as eclectic as Commander Cody, but are musically every bit as good." Erlewine's review for AllMusic noted that "There's also a dash of post-hippie humor ... and just the slightest touch of knowingly reverent reserve ... [which] is the only area where the record stumbles, and it's a slight one."

== Track listing ==
No.	Title	Writer(s)	Length
1.	"Take Me Back to Tulsa" (originally recorded by Bob Wills and His Texas Playboys)	Bob Wills; Tommy Duncan	3:41
2.	"Daddy's Advice"	LeRoy Preston	2:24
3.	"Before You Stopped Loving Me"	Preston	3:23
4.	"Drivin' Nails in My Coffin" (originally recorded by Jerry Irby)	Jerry Irby	3:19
5.	"I'll Never Get Out of This World Alive" (originally recorded by Hank Williams)	Hank Williams; Fred Rose	2:45
6.	"Space Buggy"	Preston; Reuben Gosfield; Jim Haber	2:33
7.	"Cherokee Boogie" (originally recorded by Moon Mullican)	Moon Mullican; Chief William Redbird	3:28
8.	"Hillbilly Nut"	Preston	3:32
9.	"Your Down Home Is Uptown"	Preston; Ray Benson; Kevin Farrell	2:24
10.	"I'm the Fool Who Told You to Go"	Preston	2:25
11.	"I've Been Everywhere" (originally recorded by Geoff Mack)	Geoff Mack	2:43
12.	"The Son Shines Down on Me" (originally recorded by Connie Smith)	Larry Lee Favorite	4:00
Total length:			37:12

== Personnel ==
Asleep at the Wheel

- Ray Benson – vocals, lead guitar
- Chris O'Connell – vocals, rhythm guitar
- LeRoy Preston – vocals, drums
- Gene Dobkin – vocals, upright and electric basses
- Lucky Oceans – pedal and lap steel guitars
- Floyd Domino – piano, organ

Additional personnel

- Johnny Gimble – fiddle, electric mandolin, rhythm guitar
- Andy Stein – fiddle
- Buddy Spicher – fiddle
- Tommy Allsup – production
- Tom Sparkman – engineering
- Mike Salisbury – art direction
- Lloyd Ziff – design
- Jim Marshall – photography
