= Johnny Nicholas =

American blues musician (born 1948)

- Also known as: Guitar Johnny
- Born: 1948 (age 77–78)
- Genres: Blues, western swing
- Instruments: Guitar, piano, harmonica, mandolin
- Years active: 1958–1981; 1991–present
- Labels: Bona Dea Music, and Top Cat Records
- Website: Official Artist Site Future Blues Digital Downloads

Johnny Nicholas (born 1948) is an American blues musician. He is most noted for being a member of the Grammy Award winning group, Asleep at the Wheel.

== Biography ==
Nicholas grew up in Rhode Island, United States, where he formed his first band, The Vikings. The band performed cover versions of popular rhythm and blues hits of the time, along with songs by the Rolling Stones. In the mid-1960s, he formed the Black Cat Blues Band with Duke Robillard, Fran Christina and Steve Nardella. Around 1970, he formed the Boogie Brothers with Nardella. After attending the Ann Arbor Blues Festival in 1970, the band eventually moved on to San Francisco, California in 1972 per-request of Commander Cody and His Lost Planet Airmen.

By 1974, Nicholas had moved to Chicago, Illinois and began playing with Big Walter Horton. During his time in Chicago, he would record music with Horton, Boogie Woogie Red and Robert Lockwood, Jr. In 1974, he created his own single, "Too Many Bad Habits" for Blind Pig Records. Moving to Providence, Rhode Island, he formed his own band, Johnny Nicholas and the Rhythm Rockers, which included Kaz Kazanoff on saxophone, Terry Bingham on drums, Sarah Brown on bass guitar and Ronnie Earl on electric guitar.

Nicholas began his stint with Asleep at the Wheel in 1978, when the band asked him to perform with them. During his off time, he would travel to various cities for solo shows, but would often visit Louisiana to play with Link Davis and Cajun accordion player Nathan Abshire.

By 1980, however, Nicholas decided to take time off from music in order to raise a family. Since 1981, Nicholas and his wife Brenda have owned and managed a roadside restaurant (formerly a gas station) called the Hill Top Café near Fredericksburg, Texas. After fathering three boys, Nicholas returned to recording blues music with Johnny Shines and Snooky Pryor on the album Back to the Country in 1991. Since then, he has released one studio album and three live albums on Topcat Records while also returning to regular live shows.

== Discography ==
- 1978: Too Many Bad Habits – Blind Pig
- 1988: Broke Again – Hill Top Records
- 1994: Thrill on the Hill – Antone's
- 2001: Rockin' My Blues to Sleep – Topcat
- 2005: Livin' with the Blues – Topcat
- 2006: Texas All-Star: Big Band Bash – TopCat
- 2012: Future Blues – Bona Dea Music
- 2012: The Golden Triangle: Swamp Blues – TopCat
- 2016: Fresh Air
- 2017: Too Many Bad Habits – Rerelease
- 2020: Mistaken Identity – Valcour Records
