= Lucky Oceans =

American-Australian guitarist and radio announcer

Background information
- Born: Reuben Gosfield; 21 April 1951 (age 75); Philadelphia, Pennsylvania, U.S.
- Genres: Blues; rock and roll
- Occupations: Musician; guitarist; songwriter
- Years active: 1969–present
- Labels: United Artists; Epic; Capitol; Columbia; Head

Lucky Oceans (born Reuben Gosfield, 21 April 1951) is an American pedal steel guitarist and a former member of country and Western swing band Asleep at the Wheel. From 1995 to 2017 he was a broadcaster in Perth, Western Australia with the Australian Broadcasting Corporation.

His presence on the local music scene stretches from his early music to being a member of local group the Zydecats.

== Biography ==
=== Early life ===
Oceans was born in Philadelphia, Pennsylvania on 21 April 1951 to Eugene (a salesman at an aluminium fabricating company) and Phyllis (a drama teacher). Three out of their four children are musicians, with Avery specialising in early music for the recorder (based in Milan), Anne a modern composer and improviser on keyboards (based in New York) and Josh Gosfield a visual artist, who does a lot of music connected work: cover art and video art direction.

In 1977 he met a young Australian photographer from The Boston Globe, Christine Haddow, whom he married in 1979 and had a daughter, Leela.

=== Asleep at the Wheel ===
In 1969, Ray Benson and Oceans co-founded Asleep at the Wheel in Paw Paw, West Virginia, and soon after they found themselves opening for Alice Cooper and Hot Tuna in Washington, DC. A year later, they moved to East Oakland, California at the invitation of Commander Cody and His Lost Planet Airmen. After being mentioned in Rolling Stone magazine by Van Morrison, they landed a record deal with United Artists. In 1973, their debut album, Comin' Right at Ya was released by United Artists. At the request of Willie Nelson, they left Oakland and moved to Austin, Texas in 1974.

In 1974, they released their second album, Asleep at the Wheel with a cover of Louis Jordan's "Choo Choo Ch'Boogie", which was their first single to hit the country charts. The following year saw the release of Texas Gold as the group's third album with the top-ten Country hit single The Letter That Johnny Walker Read. In addition, they played on PBS's Austin City Limits, where they have since performed a record-setting ten times. The band released their next album, Wheelin' and Dealin' in 1976 with their cover version of the classic "Route 66" garnered a Grammy nomination. In 1977, the band was voted Best Country Western Band by Rolling Stone Magazine and was awarded the Touring Band of the Year by the Academy of Country Music. They also went on tour with Emmylou Harris in Europe. The following year, they made a cover of Count Basie's song "One O'Clock Jump". Also in 1978, they appeared in the movie Roadie, along with Meat Loaf, Blondie and Art Carney. By the end of the decade, the band recorded their first live album Served Live at the Austin Opera House.

As member of the Asleep at the Wheel he won the Grammy Award for the 'Best Country Instrumental' in 1978 for the band's remake of Count Basie's "One O'clock Jump".

=== Australian career ===
In 1980 he moved to his wife's hometown of Fremantle, Western Australia On his arrival in Australia, Oceans became a member of Jim Fisher's band Outlaws, later joining Anna Gare in Nansing and the Jam Tarts, before finally uniting with guitarist Kent 'Beast' Hughes (Steve Tallis) to form the band, Dude Ranch in 1987. Oceans and Hughes were joined by Richard Danker on bass, Gary France on drums and Peter Busher on guitars and vocals.

His current band Zydecats was formed in 1993 a few years after he began playing the button-accordion. The Zydecats started when Lucky approached Bill Rogers (vocals, saxophone and harmonica) to play some Zydeco together with fellow Dude Ranch member, Hughes. Their idea was to combine Zydeco with 'Cat' music – swing, jump blues and rockabilly, plus any other style that suited the line-up, including rock and roll, country blues, soul, R&B, Cajun and New Orleans R&B. They were initially joined by France (Dude Ranch) during the formative stages and first few gigs but France was replaced by Evan Jenkins (a graduate from the Edith Cowan University jazz course). Jenkins and fellow ECU graduate, Paul Binns, were the Zydecats' rhythm section for the first year, but were eventually replaced by Konrad Park and Ben Franz. Park was later replaced by drummer, Ric Eastman, whilst Franz was replaced by Graeme Bell on bass.

In 1993 he won a second Grammy Award ('Best Country Performance by a Duo') with Asleep at the Wheel for the band's collaboration with Lyle Lovett on "Blues for Dixie" from the 1993 album A Tribute to Bob Wills and the Texas Playboys.

Lucky was inducted into the WAMi 'Rock n' Roll of Renown' in 1994 and thus into the WAM Hall of Fame in 2004.

Radio Presenter

In 1995, despite having had no previous experience, Lucky began work as presenter for the daily radio show 'The Planet', on Radio National, which featured an eclectic mix of music from around the world, and was the only daily Perth-based radio program that broadcasts nationally. In 2001, he presented a six episode spin-off TV series of the same name on ABC TV, in which he played a significant creative role due to his vast knowledge of international music; knowledge which he also shares as co-ordinator of the World Music Cultures course at the University of Western Australia. The Daily Planet was cancelled as part of controversial cuts to the ABC RN budget, in 2017, and the last show aired on Friday 20 January 2017.

=== Guillain–Barré syndrome ===
In October 2008 Oceans was placed in critical care in the United States after coming down with a rare and debilitating nerve condition. Oceans, whilst visiting family, was diagnosed with Guillain–Barré syndrome, a rare disorder with no known cause that affects the nervous system. He was admitted to the Abington Memorial Hospital in Pennsylvania, where he began treatment. In an email to his colleagues Oceans advised:

I am in good spirits and in good care and hope to see you all soon and bore you with tales of spinal taps, my hours spent in an MRI, my hospital angels and this strange condition.

— Lucky Oceans

In March 2009, he posted a story of his sickness and recovery on the ABC website, which included links and details about Guillain–Barré syndrome.

== Discography ==
=== Asleep at the Wheel ===
- Comin' right at ya! – United Artists (1973)
- Asleep at the Wheel – Epic (1974)
- Texas Gold – Capitol (1975)
- Wheelin' and Dealin – Capitol (1976)
- The Wheel – Capitol (1977)
- Served Live – Capitol (1979)
- Tribute to the music of Bob Wills – Capitol (1993)
- Back to the future now – Live in Las Vegas – Columbia (1995)

=== Solo ===
- Lucky Steels the Wheel – Independent (1982)
- Secret Steel – Head Records (2005)

=== Dude Ranch ===
- Dude Ranch – Independent (1991)

=== Zydecats ===
- Zydecats – Independent (1998)
- Live at Clancy's – Independent (2005)

=== Contributions ===
- Amateur Night in the Big Top (2003) – contributed pedal steel and accordion to Shaun Ryder's first solo release.
- Dirt Music (in collaboration with Tim Winton) – ABC Music (2001)
- Tognolini, Barry.(1992) Now and then sound recording. Australia : Columbia, Columbia: 472384 2. Barry Tognolini, pianist and arranger; Sara Macliver, vocalist (3rd and 13th works); Simon Styles, saxophone (1st work); Lucky Oceans, pedal steel and dobro guitar (12th work)
- These are my Blues: A tribute to Big Joe Williams (vocals and guitar) Stobie Sounds compilation album. Adelaide, South Australia.

== Awards ==
=== West Australian Music Industry Awards ===
The West Australian Music Industry Awards are annual awards celebrating achievements for Western Australian music. They commenced in 1985.

Year	Nominee / work	Award	Result
1994	Lucky Oceans	Rock 'n' Roll of Renown	inductee
