= Tony Garnier (musician) =

American bassist

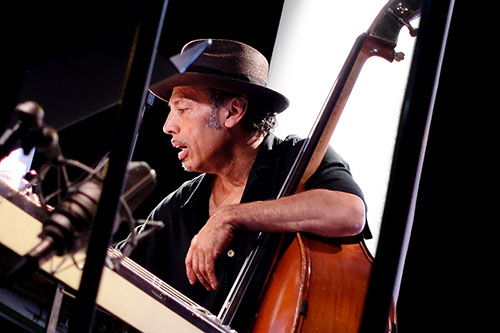
- Garnier in 2015

Background information
- Born: May 10, 1955 (age 70); Saint Paul, Minnesota, U.S.
- Genres: Rock; folk; blues; country
- Occupation: Musician
- Instrument: Bass
- Years active: 1976–present

Tony Garnier (born May 10, 1955) is an American bassist, best known as an accompanist to Bob Dylan, with whom he has played since 1989.

== Biography ==
Garnier was born in Saint Paul, Minnesota, and grew up in southern California. His grandfather, D'Jalma "Papa" Garnier, was a New Orleans jazz trumpeter and bandleader. Garnier's brother, also named D'Jalma, is a Creole fiddler.

Garnier joined Dylan's Never Ending Tour band in 1989, and has sometimes been characterized as his musical director, assisting with setlists and acting as a liaison between Dylan and the rest of the band.

In addition to his work with Dylan, Garnier has recorded with such artists as Tom Waits, Loudon Wainwright III, Paul Simon, Marc Ribot, Eric Andersen, Asleep at the Wheel, the Lounge Lizards, Buster Poindexter, and Michelle Branch. Garnier has also played with the Saturday Night Live Band, occasionally substituting for bassist T-Bone Wolk.
