= Floyd Domino =

American musician

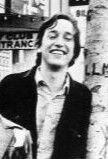
- Domino in 1976

Background information
- Born: California, U.S.
- Genres: Western swing; jazz; boogie-woogie; swing; blues; country
- Occupation: Musician
- Formerly of: Asleep at the Wheel

Floyd Domino is an American musician known for his work in the genre of Western swing.

== Biography ==
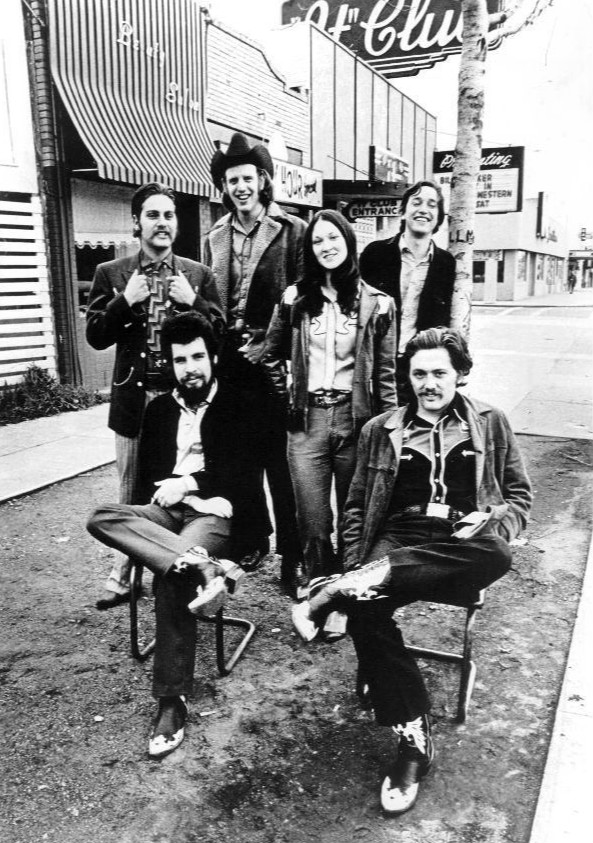
Domino (back row, standing, first from right) as part of the band Asleep at the Wheel in 1976

Born a native of California, Domino was introduced to Western swing by way of the musicians who had migrated from Texas and Oklahoma in the 1930s and 1940s. Floyd's close association with Western swing coincided with joining Asleep at the Wheel at the age of 19. After 7 years with Asleep at the Wheel, he is now an "AATW Alumnus" who still joins them for featured performances. While Floyd is widely recognized for his years with Asleep at the Wheel and the revival of Western swing, Floyd began his career with a broad grounding in jazz, boogie-woogie, swing and blues piano. He regularly performs as Floyd Domino Jazz Trio showcasing a unique blend of jazz and blues. Other performances include work with Willie Nelson, Merle Haggard, George Strait, The Texas Playboys, Waylon Jennings, jazz guitarist Herb Ellis, Kelly Willis, Bruce Robison, Monte Warden, Don Walser, jazz vocalist Donna Hightower, and the Crickets.

In addition to a career encompassing live performances, recording (both solo and with a host of legendary performers), Floyd has contributed to promoting American roots music through his appearances at schools, camps and other learning organizations. Between his touring, recording and major performances, Floyd plays clubs, private events and contributes his talents to further roots music appreciation

== Awards list ==
- 1978 Grammy : Count Basie's One O'Clock Jump Asleep at the Wheel (Instrumental)
- 2000 Top Ten Austin Theatre Critics' Table Award for Musical Direction The Best Little Whorehouse in Texas (Austin Stages)
- 2000 Grammy: Best Country Instrumental Featured Artist with Asleep at the Wheel Bob's Breakdown Asleep at the Wheel 's recording Ride With Bob
- 2002 "Instrumentalist of the Year" Academy of Western Artists Will Rogers Award (2002
- 2004 Cowtown Society of Western Music (2004 "Heroes of Western Music"" Living Hero Floyd Domino
- 2006 Top Ten Austin Best Keyboards Award
- 2007 Top Ten Austin Best Keyboards Award
- 2008 Top Ten Austin Best Keyboards Award
- 2009 Top Ten Austin Best Keyboards Award
- 2009 Austin Best Keyboards Award
- 2017 Inductee, Texas Music Legends Hall of Fame

== CD list ==
Appearing on over 50 top CDs plus 5 foreign releases

Title	Date	Artist
20th Century Masters – The Millennium Collection: The Best of Asleep at the Wheel	2001	Asleep at the Wheel
Angels & Outlaws	2008	Aaron Watson
Back to the Future Now: Live at Arizona Charlie's, Las Vegas	1997	Asleep at the Wheel
Best of the Hightone Years	2002	Dale Watson
Beyond the Blue Neon	1989	George Strait
Beyond Time	2003	Ray Benson
Bruce Robison	1995	Bruce Robison
Cheatin' Heart Attack	1995	Dale Watson
Chill of an Early Fall	1991	George Strait
Dreamland	2004	Dale Watson
Easy	2002	Kelly Willis
Eleven Stories	2006	Bruce Robison
Every Song I Write Is for You	2001	Dale Watson
For the Ladies Enhanced CD	2004	Redd Volkaert
Full Western Dress	1999	The Derailers
Geoff Muldaur and the Texas Sheiks	2009	Geoff Muldaur
Goin to Town	2003	Craig Chambers
Hard Road Tough Country	1998	Peter Caulton
Here We Go Again	2007	Red Steagall
Hey Nashvegas	2001	Jesse Dayton
Hightower Boogie Woogie	1997	Floyd Domino
Holding My Own	1992	George Strait
Homeland	1989	Tish Hinojosa
The Honky Tonk Kid	2004	Aaron Watson
I Hate These Songs	1997	Dale Watson
If I Could Only Fly	2000	Merle Haggard
If You Ain't Lovin' You Ain't Livin'	1988	George Strait
If You Don't Buy This I'll Find Somebody Who Will	1995	Jon Emery
I'll Hold You in My Heart	2000	Don Walser
It's a Good Day	2010	Asleep at the Wheel
It's All Relative: Tillis Sings Tillis: Tillis Sings Tillis	2002	Pam Tillis
Jukebox Music	2008	Mitch Jacobs
Live From Austin, TX: Austin City Limits '84; DVD; Digipak	2008	Waylon Jennings
Live from the Last of the Breed Tour	2009	Merle Haggard
Livin' It Up	1990	George Strait
Livin' with the Blues	2005	Johnny Nicholas
Me and the Drummer	2000	Willie Nelson & the Offenders
Monte Warden	1993	Monte Warden
More...	1999	Trace Adkins
No Stranger to a Tele	2001	Redd Volkaert
Pasture Prime	1985	Asleep at the Wheel
Raisin' Cain	1995	Jesse Dayton
Retrospective: Just One More Time	2006	The Derailers
Rich From The Journey	2000	Kimmie Rhodes
Ride With Bob	1999	Asleep at the Wheel
Rockin' My Blues To Sleep	2001	Johnny Nicholas & The Texas All-Stars
Rolling Stone from Texas	1994	Don Walser
Slide Show	2004	Cindy Cashdollar
Song of South Austin	2002	Cornell Hurd
Songs of Forbidden Love	1998	Wandering Eyes
Songs of Moon Mullican	2009	Hurb Band
Strait Out of the Box	1995	George Strait
Swing CD	2003	—
Tender Years	2010	Mike Runnels
Texas All-Star: Big Band Bash	2006	Johnny Nicholas
Texas Legend	2006	Don Walser
Texas Rose	1997	Billy Paul
Texas Swings	1992	Herb Ellis
Thrill on the Hill	1994	Johnny Nicholas
Totally Guacamole	1993	Gary P. Nunn
Tribute to the Music of Bob Wills and The Texas Playboys	1993	Asleep at the Wheel
Tribute to the Music of Bob Wills and The Texas Playboys; CD Remix	1993	Asleep at the Wheel
Unforgettable	2004	Merle Haggard
Way Out West	1996	Wylie & The Wild West
What the Hey	2003	Howard Kalish
Whiskey or God	2006	Dale Watson
Why the Hell Not...: The Songs of Kinky Friedman	2006	Kinky Friedman
The White Album	1998	Floyd Domino
Willie and the Wheel; Deluxe edition	2009	Willie Nelson and Asleep at the Wheel
Willie Nelson & Asleep at the Wheel	2009	Willie Nelson and Asleep at the Wheel
Wrapped	1998	Bruce Robison

Appears on [Imports]

Title	Date	Artist
Beyond Time	2003	Ray Benson
Hard Road Tough Country	1998 Germany	Peter Caulton
If You Don't Buy This I'll Find Somebody Who Will	1995 Germany	Jon Emery
Served Live	1979 United Kingdom	Asleep at the Wheel
Texas Rose	1997 Germany	Billy Paul

Children's music

Title	Date	Artist
Baby Road	1987	Floyd Domino
Four Tots	1993	Floyd Domino
Peggy Sue	1991	Floyd Domino
Sleepy in Seattle	1995	Floyd Domino
The White Album	1989	Floyd Domino

== Musical direction ==
- Musical Director, Austin: Best Little Whorehouse in Texas
