= The Avett Brothers discography =

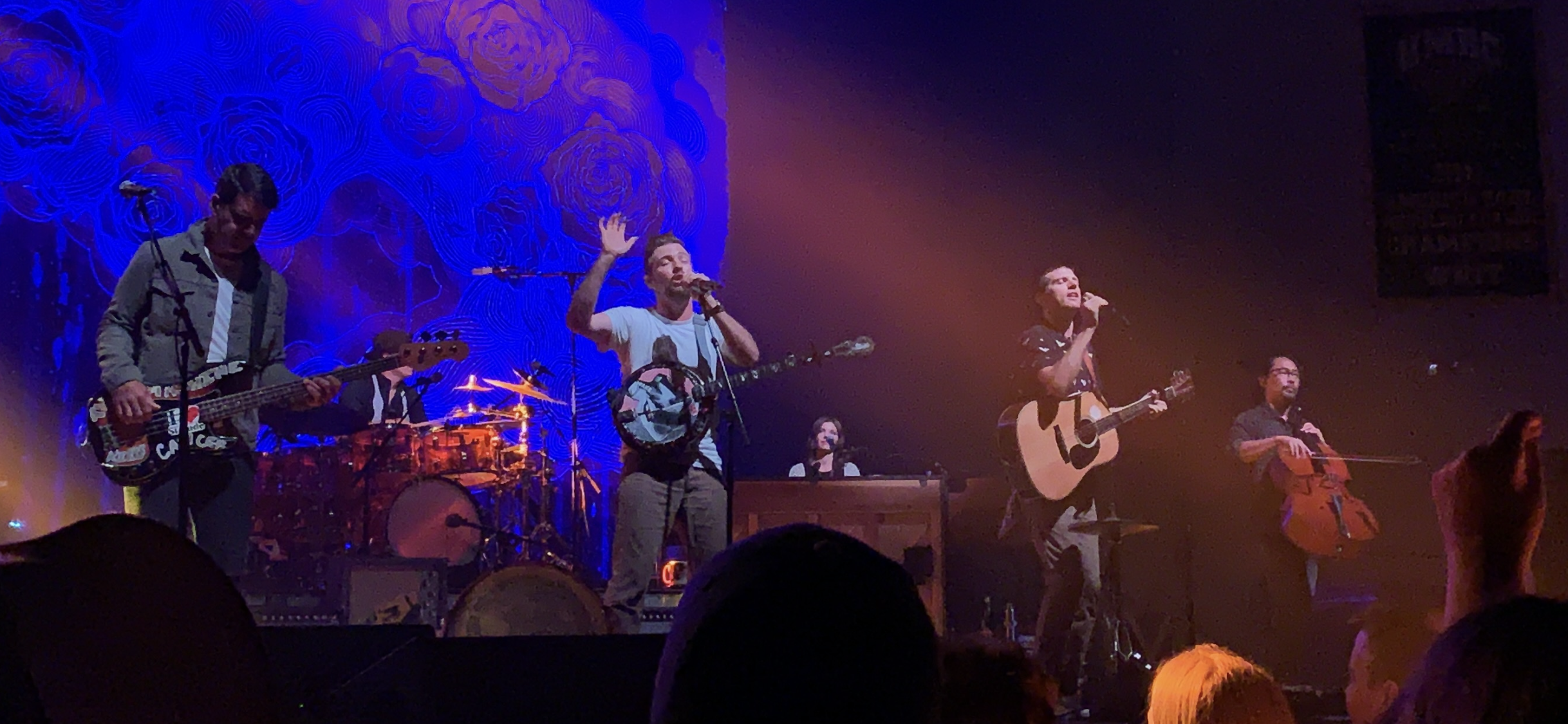
- The Avett Brothers at UMBC, 2018
- Studio albums: 11
- EPs: 5
- Live albums: 4
- Singles: 18
- Music videos: 16
- Other appearances: 11

The discography of American folk rock band The Avett Brothers consists of 11 studio albums, four live albums and five extended plays (EPs). The band was formed in 2000 in Mount Pleasant, North Carolina by Scott Avett and Seth Avett, who were later joined by Bob Crawford in 2001 and Joe Kwon in 2006.

== Albums ==
=== Studio albums ===
Title	Details	Peak chart positions						Sales
Title	Details	US	US Rock	US Folk	CAN	NLD	UK	Sales
Country Was	Released: March 4, 2002; Label: Ramseur	—	—	—	—	—	—	
A Carolina Jubilee	Released: August 19, 2003; Label: Ramseur	—	—	—	—	—	—	
Mignonette	Released: July 27, 2004; Label: Ramseur	—	—	—	—	—	—	
Four Thieves Gone: The Robbinsville Sessions	Released: February 6, 2006; Label: Ramseur	—	—	—	—	—	—	
Emotionalism	Released: May 15, 2007; Label: Ramseur	134	—	—	—	—	—	
I and Love and You	Released: September 29, 2009; Label: American	16	7	1	—	76	72	US: 500,000+
The Carpenter	Released: September 11, 2012; Label: American	4	3	2	8	—	—	
Magpie and the Dandelion	Released: October 15, 2013; Label: American	5	3	1	—	—	—	US: 171,000
True Sadness	Release date: June 24, 2016; Label: American	3	1	1	23	—	—	
Closer Than Together	Release date: October 4, 2019; Label: American	28	4	2	—	—	—	
The Avett Brothers	Release date: May 17, 2024; Label: Ramseur	134	—	13	—	—	—	
AVTT/PTTN	Release date: November 14, 2025; Label: Ramseur & Ipecac Recordings	—	—	—	—	—	—	
"—" denotes a recording that did not chart or was not released in that territory.

=== Live albums ===
Title	Details	Peak chart positions	
Title	Details	US Rock	US Folk
Live at the Double Door Inn	Released: August 15, 2002; Label: Self-released	—	—
Live, Volume 2	Released: May 17, 2005; Label: Ramseur	—	—
Live, Volume 3	Released: 2010; Label: American	—	—
Live, Vol. Four	Released: December 18, 2015; Label: American	24	5
"—" denotes a recording that did not chart.

== EPs ==
Title	Details	Peak chart positions		
Title	Details	US	US Indie	US Cat.
The Avett Bros.	Released: 2000; Label: Self-released	—	—	—
Swept Away	Released: February 2004; Label: Ramseur	—	—	—
The Gleam	Released: September 19, 2006; Label: Ramseur	149	—	20
The Second Gleam	Released: July 22, 2008; Label: Ramseur	82	10	—
The Third Gleam	Released: August 28, 2020; Label: Loma Vista	67	—	—
"—" denotes a recording that did not chart.

== Singles ==
List of singles, with selected chart positions, showing year released and album name
Year	Title	Peak chart positions				Album
Year	Title	US AAA	US Alt.	US Rock	US Rock Airplay	Album
2003	"In the Curve"/"Tale of Coming News"	—	—	—	—	A Carolina Jubilee
2004	"Swept Away"	—	—	—	—	Mignonette
2009	"I and Love and You"	7	—	—	—	I and Love and You
2010	"Head Full of Doubt/Road Full of Promise"	7	—	—	—	I and Love and You
2010	"Slight Figure of Speech"	—	—	—	—	I and Love and You
2011	"Kick Drum Heart"	24	—	—	—	I and Love and You
2012	"Live and Die"	3	—	49	47	The Carpenter
2013	"February Seven"	10	—	—	—	The Carpenter
2013	"Another Is Waiting"	6	—	—	—	Magpie and the Dandelion
2016	"Ain't No Man"	1	28	27	26	True Sadness
2016	"True Sadness"	12	—	—	—	True Sadness
2018	"No Hard Feelings"	—	—	45	—	True Sadness
2018	"Roses and Sacrifice"	—	—	—	—	Non-album singles
2018	"Trouble Letting Go"	—	—	—	—	Non-album singles
2019	"Neapolitan Sky"	—	—	—	—	Non-album singles
2019	"High Steppin'"	7	—	39	50	Closer Than Together
2019	"Tell the Truth'"	18	—	—	—	Closer Than Together
2020	"Victory"	15	—	—	—	The Third Gleam
2024	"Love of a Girl"	7	—	—	45	The Avett Brothers
2024	"Country Kid"	—	—	—	—	The Avett Brothers
2024	"Forever Now"	—	—	—	—	The Avett Brothers
2025	"Eternal Love"	—	—	—	—	AVTT/PTTN
2025	"Heaven's Breath"	—	—	—	—	AVTT/PTTN
"—" denotes a recording that did not chart or was not released in that territory.

== Other album appearances ==
- Pickathon Music Festival 2006 – "November Blue" (2006)
- WYEP Live & Direct: Volume 8 – "Swept Away" (2007)
- Live at KEXP Vol.5 – "The Weight of Lies" (2009)
- WFPK Live: Volume Four – "I and Love and You" (2009)
- Broken Hearts & Dirty Windows: Songs of John Prine – "Spanish Pipedream" cover (2010)
- My Favorite Gifts – "I Thank God" cover (2011)
- WYEP Live & Direct: Volume 14 – "Tear Down the House" (2012)
- Chimes of Freedom: The Songs of Bob Dylan – "One Too Many Mornings" cover with remixed archival recordings of Johnny Cash (2012)
- Still the King: Celebrating the Music of Bob Wills and His Texas Playboys – "The Girl I Left Behind Me" cover with Asleep at the Wheel (2015)
- GNWMT: Ten Year Anniversary Recording to Benefit MyMusicRx – "One Line Wonder" (2016)
- Music from The American Epic Sessions: Original Motion Picture Soundtrack – "Closer Walk With Thee" cover and "Jordan Am a Hard Road to Travel" cover (2017)

== Music videos ==
Year	Video	Director
2002	"November Blue"	
2007	"Paranoia in B-flat Major"	Crackerfarm
2007	"Die Die Die"	Tim Nackashi
2008	"Murder in the City"	Crackerfarm
2009	"I and Love and You"	Crackerfarm
2009	"Slight Figure of Speech"	Jody Hill
2010	"Head Full of Doubt / Road Full of Promise"	Jason Ryan Mitcham
2012	"Live and Die"	
2013	"February Seven"	Danny Clinch
2013	"Another Is Waiting"	Scott Avett
2014	"Morning Song"	Michael Bonfiglio
2014	"Bring Your Love to Me"	Hobey Ford
2016	"Ain't No Man"	Scott Avett
2016	"No Hard Feelings"	Seth Avett & Adam Rothlein
2019	"High Steppin'"	Crackerfarm
2019	"Bang Bang"	Morgan Neville
2024	"Country Kid"	
2024	"Forever Now"	
2024	"Orion's Belt"	
