= Swept Away (musical) =

- A New Musical Tale
- Promotional Poster
- Music: The Avett Brothers
- Lyrics: The Avett Brothers
- Book: John Logan
- Premiere: January 9, 2022: Berkeley Repertory Theatre, Berkeley, California
- Productions: 2022 Berkeley; 2023 Washington, D.C.; 2024 Broadway

Swept Away is a jukebox musical featuring the music of The Avett Brothers, primarily from the album Mignonette. The show's book is by John Logan. It premiered at the Berkeley Repertory Theatre in 2022 before moving to Arena Stage in Washington, D.C., where it ran from November 25 to January 14, 2024. It began previews on Broadway at the Longacre Theatre on October 29, 2024, opening on November 19, 2024. It announced a closing date of December 15, 2024. A two week extension was added, setting the new closing date for December 29, 2024.

The show follows four sailors, who are shipwrecked off the coast of New Bedford, Massachusetts in 1888. The story is drawn from the 1884 shipwreck which also inspired the Avett Brothers' album. The show is 90 minutes in total runtime with no intermission.

== Development ==
The concept of a stage musical built around the music of The Avett Brothers was first raised in 2014, when theater producer Matthew Masten approached the band’s manager about adapting their catalog for the stage. In 2017, Masten connected with playwright and screenwriter John Logan, who agreed to write the book.

Logan has described listening through the Avett Brothers’ catalog and writing a notecard for each song in order to identify narrative connections. He used the band’s 2004 album Mignonette as an initial point of inspiration, while aiming to create an original story rather than a direct dramatization of the album’s concept. Logan relocated the setting to 1888 off the coast of New Bedford, Massachusetts, and said that his writing process included a deep dive into nautical literature, citing works by James Fenimore Cooper, Joseph Conrad, and Herman Melville, as well as Two Years Before the Mast by Richard Henry Dana Jr..

In a statement released with the project’s announcement, Seth Avett said that developing the musical “built with our songs” revealed new meanings and connections for him and Scott Avett. Logan also incorporated songs from other Avett Brothers albums, and the band contributed an additional new song for the stage production, “Lord Lay Your Hand on My Shoulder.”

The Berkeley premiere was originally scheduled for June 2020, but the run was postponed during the COVID-19 pandemic. The early creative team included director Michael Mayer, with music arrangements and orchestrations credited to Chris Miller and Brian Usifer. The musical was announced to the public in 2019.

== Plot ==
In the early 1900s, Mate, dying of tuberculosis, is tormented by the memories of his crewmates who died after a shipwreck 22 years earlier. The spirits encourage him to "tell the truth" ("Go to Sleep").

In 1888, Mate is a whaling crew member under the Captain ("Hard Worker"). Seeking adventure, Little Brother joins the crew, and, after attempting to bring him back home to their family farm, Big Brother becomes stranded on the ship as well ("Nothing Short of Thankful").

Though excited for the journey, Little Brother laments the love he left behind on land, Melody Anne ("Swept Away"). He and Mate grow closer, much to Big Brother's disdain. On the third day of the voyage, Big Brother tries to rally the crew in prayer, but his attempts are in vain ("Lord Lay Your Hand on My Shoulder"/"Ain't No Man"). Captain ponders the future of the whaling trade and his life as a sailor ("May It Last"). Though Big Brother and Little Brother disagree on their purpose and desires in life, they value their brotherhood and agree on the importance of family ("Murder in the City").

Soon after, the ship is struck by a storm and sinks ("Complainte D'Un Matelot Mourant"). The entire crew dies in the wreckage, save for Mate, Captain, and the Brothers. After six days in a lifeboat with no food, water, or rain, the four men share their hopes for an eventual rescue ("A Gift for Melody Anne"). Little Brother, severely injured after being crushed by the falling mast, dictates a letter to Melody Anne for Mate to transcribe. Captain, distraught at having allowed his crew to perish alone, and Big Brother, insistent that Little Brother will not die alone, also dictate letters to their loved ones. Mate, realizing he has no one to write to, reflects on what he has made of his life ("Through My Prayers").

After sixteen days stranded at sea, the four are starving. Mate tells Captain that Little Brother will die soon anyway and that they should kill him in his sleep so the rest of them can have something to eat and drink ("Satan Pulls the Strings"). Captain refuses to make a decision, instead telling Mate that he is in charge now. Big Brother stops Mate from killing Little Brother, though Little Brother agrees that he will sacrifice himself after seeing one last sunrise. Big Brother concedes, but insists that he will be the one to kill him, not Mate ("No Hard Feelings"). When the time comes to make the sacrifice, however, Big Brother slits his own throat instead.

Mate struggles to continue the story, but is urged by the others to "make himself clean." Mate recounts how they all ate and drank from Big Brother's body. They were found by another ship soon after, but the three never spoke of the incident again. Captain died three years after the incident, and Little Brother just one year ago, surrounded by Melody Anne and their children. With the confession of the truth, Mate completes the retelling of the story and dies ("The Once and Future Carpenter").

== Music ==
Swept Away features songs previously written and recorded by The Avett Brothers, with the exception of "Lord Lay Your Hand on My Shoulder" which was written for the show.

=== Musical Numbers ===
- "Go to Sleep" – Mate and Company (from Emotionalism)
- "Hard Worker" – Mate and Ensemble (from Mignonette)
- "Nothing Short of Thankful" – Little Brother, Mate, Big Brother and Company (from Mignonette)
- "Swept Away" – Little Brother, Mate, Captain and Sailor (from Mignonette)
- "Lord Lay Your Hand On My Shoulder" – Big Brother and Little Brother
- "Ain't No Man" – Mate, Little Brother, Big Brother and Company (from True Sadness)
- "May It Last" – Captain, Mate and Ensemble (from True Sadness)
- "Murder in the City" – Little Brother, Big Brother and Ensemble (from The Second Gleam)
- "Complainte d'un Matelot Mourant" – Company (from Mignonette)
- "A Gift for Melody Anne" – Big Brother, Little Brother, Mate and Captain (from Mignonette)
- "Through My Prayers" – Little Brother, Captain and Big Brother (from The Carpenter)
- "Satan Pulls the Strings" – Mate and Ensemble (from True Sadness)
- "No Hard Feelings" – Little Brother and Big Brother (from True Sadness)
- "The Once and Future Carpenter" – Mate and Company (from The Carpenter)

== Productions ==
=== Berkeley (2022) ===
Initially scheduled to premiere in June 2020, the show was delayed due to the onset of the COVID-19 pandemic. It finally saw its Berkeley premiere in 2022. It was directed by Michael Mayer and led by actors Wayne Duvall (Captain), Adrian Blake Enscoe (Little Brother), John Gallagher Jr. (Mate), and Stark Sands (Big Brother). The show's set was designed by Rachel Hauck. The premiere saw low attendance, attributed to a surge of the omicron variant of COVID-19.

=== Washington, D.C. (2023–2024) ===
The Arena Stage production in Washington, D.C., which ran from November 25, 2023, to January 14, 2024, saw much of the Berkeley team return, including the four primary cast members. This production also saw the introduction of an ensemble, who mainly appeared in the opening scenes prior to the shipwreck.

=== Broadway (2024) ===
The musical opened on Broadway at the Longacre Theatre on November 19, 2024, following previews beginning on October 29, and received mixed reviews. The production was directed by Michael Mayer and choreographed by David Neumann. The show's arrangements and orchestrations were by Chris Miller and Brian Usifer (who was also the show's music supervisor). The creative team also included Will Van Dyke (music director), Rachel Hauck (scenic designer), Susan Hilferty (costume designer), Kevin Adams (lighting designer), and John Shivers (sound designer).

On December 5, 2024, it was announced that the show would close on December 15. Following the closing announcement, the production extended its run through December 29, 2024, and closed after 20 previews and 48 performances.

In a first-person essay for American Theatre, cast member John Gallagher Jr. described efforts to avert the early closing, and wrote that the announcement prompted a surge in attendance during the final weeks; he also wrote that The Avett Brothers returned to New York for post-show performances, and that Patti LuPone attended during the closing stretch.

A Broadway cast recording was announced in December 2024 and released digitally in February 2025. In May 2025, the production’s official social media account stated that the cast recording had surpassed one million streams on Spotify.

The Broadway show was produced by Matthew Masten, Sean Hudock, Madison Wells Live, Louise Gund and Kate Cannova, with assistance from Jimmy Buffett.

The production received a nomination for the Tony Award for Best Scenic Design of a Musical.

==== Reunion concerts (2025) ====
On April 28, 2025, members of the Broadway cast reunited for a pair of sold-out concert performances at the Bowery Ballroom in New York City. Playbill reported that the reunion concert would feature the full Broadway company, led by principal cast members John Gallagher Jr., Stark Sands, Adrian Blake Enscoe, and Wayne Duvall. The ensemble members were Josh Breckenridge, Hunter Brown, Matt DeAngelis, Cameron Johnson, Brandon Kalm, Rico LeBron, Michael J. Mainwaring, Orville Mendoza, Chase Peacock, Tyrone L. Robinson, David Rowen, and John Sygar, with swings John Michael Finley and Robert Pendilla also participating. People described the event as a one-night-only concert presented in two performances (7 p.m. and 9:45 p.m.).

== Cast and characters ==
| Character | Berkeley | Washington, D.C. | Broadway |
| Character | 2022 | 2023 | 2024 |
|---|---|---|---|
| Captain | Wayne Duvall | Wayne Duvall | Wayne Duvall |
| Little Brother | Adrian Blake Enscoe | Adrian Blake Enscoe | Adrian Blake Enscoe |
| Mate | John Gallagher Jr. | John Gallagher Jr. | John Gallagher Jr. |
| Big Brother | Stark Sands | Stark Sands | Stark Sands |

== Reception ==
The 2022 Berkeley production of the show saw mixed reactions. Reviewers largely enjoyed the show's music and the actors' performances, but some felt the characterization was not thorough enough to deliver the emotional climax of the story. Positive notices highlighted the production values, including Rachel Hauck's scenic design and the onstage musicianship supporting the Avett Brothers' score.

The subsequent Washington, D.C., production at Arena Stage also received mixed reviews, with some critics suggesting revisions strengthened the show. Reviewing the D.C. run for The Washington Post, Thomas Floyd called it "transfixing" and wrote that if the Berkeley premiere was a "choppy embarkment", the musical "finds its sea legs" at Arena Stage, praising the cast and creative team while still noting an "imperfect back half". Floyd also highlighted the production's musicality and emotional tone, describing its shift toward an "intimate elegy on grief and guilt" and singling out Adrian Blake Enscoe's vocals and the ensemble's harmonies. In TheaterMania, Keith Loria praised the performances and wrote that the cast and ensemble "rise to the occasion" vocally, while similarly noting that some of the crew are given limited characterization.

The 2024 Broadway production received mixed reviews, with praise for the music, performances, and set design (especially a moment in which the entire set tilts vertically to show a sinking ship). Individual reviews frequently singled out the staging and technical elements: TheaterMania described the shipwreck sequence as among the most effective onstage they had seen in a long time, emphasizing its practical theatricality. Entertainment Weekly praised the direction and performances, calling the show "harrowing and captivating" and highlighting the impact of the cast once the action is confined to a lifeboat in the second half. However, overall sentiment for the script was negative. Writing for Vulture, Sara Holdren argued that a musical assembled from preexisting songs can feel "by-the-numbers" and fall into "roteness", while also praising the production's staging and Rachel Hauck's "cleverly engineered" set and the ensemble’s choreography on the rigging.

== Awards and nominations ==
=== Original Broadway production ===
| Year | Award | Category | Nominee | Result |
|---|---|---|---|---|
| 2025 | Tony Awards | Best Scenic Design of a Musical | Rachel Hauck | Nominated |
