= Magpie and the Dandelion =

Studio album by The Avett Brothers
- Released: October 15, 2013
- Genres: Indie rock, folk rock, folk punk, roots rock, Americana
- Length: 43:04
- Label: American
- Producer: Rick Rubin

The Avett Brothers chronology
The Carpenter (2012)	Magpie and the Dandelion (2013)	Live, Vol. Four (2015)

Magpie and the Dandelion is the eighth studio album by folk rock group The Avett Brothers, released on October 15, 2013. The album was produced by Rick Rubin who produced their previous two full-length studio albums, 2009's I and Love and You and 2012's The Carpenter. The band first announced they were working on the album in a June 12, 2013 interview and that the songs were all recorded during The Carpenter's recording sessions. The album's title and release date, along with the first single from the album "Another is Waiting," were released on NPR's All Songs Considered on August 8, 2013. All 11 songs became available for streaming on October 9, 2013 on NPR's First Listen.

The album was recorded during the same recording sessions as The Carpenter and in an open letter to fans published on August 8 the band says the album conveys a feeling on "youthful wonder".

The album received generally favorable praise from critics and reached #5 on the U.S. Billboard 200 chart during its first week.

== Commercial performance ==
The album debuted at No. 5 on the Billboard 200 albums chart on its first week of release, with around 58,000 sold in the United States. It also debuted at No. 1 on Folk Albums, and No. 3 on Rock Albums chart. As of December 2015, the album has sold 171,000 copies in the US.

== Track listing ==
No.	Title	Length
1.	"Open-Ended Life"	4:50
2.	"Morning Song"	3:54
3.	"Never Been Alive"	3:10
4.	"Another Is Waiting"	2:08
5.	"Bring Your Love To Me"	3:43
6.	"Good to You"	4:24
7.	"Part from Me"	5:06
8.	"Skin and Bones"	3:57
9.	"Souls Like the Wheels [Live]"	4:10
10.	"Vanity"	2:48
11.	"The Clearness Is Gone"	4:54

Magpie and the Dandelion — Deluxe Edition
No.	Title	Length
12.	"Vanity (Demo)"	3:01
13.	"Every Morning Song (Demo)"	4:00
14.	"Another Is Waiting (Demo)"	2:18
15.	"Bring Your Love (Demo)"	4:06
16.	"Skin and Bones (Demo) (Target exclusive)"	4:04
17.	"The Clearness is Gone (Demo) (Target exclusive)"	3:56
18.	"Apart From Me (Demo) (TopSpin exclusive)"	5:11
19.	"Open Ended Life (Demo) (TopSpin exclusive)"	4:13

== Personnel ==
The Avett Brothers

- Scott Yancey Avett – Lead and Backing Vocals, Banjo, Piano, Acoustic Guitar
- Timothy Seth Avett – Lead and Backing Vocals, Acoustic and Electric Guitar, Piano, Organ, Celeste
- Bob Crawford – Upright and Electric Bass, Lead and Backing Vocals
- Joseph Kwon – Cello

All songs performed by The Avett Brothers with help from...

- Jacob Edwards (drums on 1, 3, 4, 6, 8, 10)
- Lenny Castro (percussion on 1, 2, 4, 5, 7, 8, 10, 11)
- Chad Smith (drums on 2)
- Steven Nistor (drums on 5, 11)
- Benmont Tench (organ on 2, 7, 8)
- G. Love (harmonica on 1)
- Tania Elizabeth (fiddle on 1)
- ...finale vocals for Morning Song: The Haas Family, Jim Avett, Sarah Avett, Susan Kay Avett, Jessica Lea Mayfield, Aaron "Woody" Wood, Mary Ellen Bush, Jacob Edwards, Stephanie Mirabelli, Charlotte Webb, Hattie Webb

Production

- Rick Rubin – Producer
- Ryan Hewitt – Engineer, Mixing
- Dave Collins – Mastering
- Justin Glanville – Engineer (9)
- Jordan Silva, Jon Ashley, Julian Dreyer, Evan Bradford and Evan Hill – Recording Assistants
- Recorded at Echo Mountain Recording, Asheville, NC, Shangri-La Studios, Malibu, CA, Lock Stock Studio, Venice, CA
- Mixed at Lock Stock Studio, Venice, CA
- Additional Engineers – Darren Heelis, Buckley Miller, Craig Welsh, Tucker Martine

== Charts ==
=== Weekly charts ===
Chart (2013)	Peak position
US Billboard 200	5
US Top Alternative Albums (Billboard)	2
US Digital Albums (Billboard)	2
US Americana/Folk Albums (Billboard)	1
US Top Rock Albums (Billboard)	3
US Indie Store Album Sales (Billboard)	3
US Vinyl Albums (Billboard)	2

=== Year-end charts ===
Chart (2013)	Position
US Billboard Top Rock Albums	73
