= The Avett Brothers (album) =

- The cover art, designed by Scott Avett.

Studio album by the Avett Brothers
- Released: May 17, 2024
- Studio: Shangri-La (Malibu, California); Blackbird (Nashville, Tennessee)
- Genre: Folk; alternative country; Americana
- Length: 39:27
- Label: American, Ramseur Records, Thirty Tigers
- Producer: Rick Rubin

The Avett Brothers chronology
The Third Gleam (2020)	The Avett Brothers (2024)	AVTT/PTTN (2025)

The Avett Brothers is the self-titled eleventh studio album by American folk rock band the Avett Brothers. The album was released on May 17, 2024, by American Recordings, Ramseur Records, and Thirty Tigers.

== Critical reception ==
Professional ratings
Aggregate scores
Source	Rating
Metacritic	68/100
Review scores
Source	Rating
AllMusic	3/5 stars
PopMatters	6/10
Paste	7.2/10

The Avett Brothers received generally positive reviews from critics. At Metacritic, which assigns a normalized rating out of 100 to reviews from critics, the album received an average score of 68, which indicates "generally favorable reviews," based on 9 reviews.

Critics called the album a return to form after their last full-length album Closer Than Together was poorly received upon its release in 2019. In a positive review, Timothy Monger of AllMusic wrote, "some of the songs, especially the energetic 'Love of a Girl' and 'Orion's Belt,' hark back to that heyday, but the earnest folk-pop of their later years still dominates the set." Chris Conaton of PopMatters opined that the album represented a shift into "long-term career mode" for the band, arguing that the record is "solid but not spectacular," and that, "there is enough strong material here to satisfy longtime fans."

== Promotion ==
Following the release of the album, the band promoted the record by performing "Forever Now" on Jimmy Kimmel Live and CBS Saturday Morning, as well as "Love Of A Girl" on The Tonight Show Starring Jimmy Fallon.

== Track listing ==
No.	Title	Length
1.	"Never Apart"	5:23
2.	"Love of a Girl"	3:16
3.	"Cheap Coffee"	7:08
4.	"Forever Now"	4:25
5.	"Country Kid"	3:33
6.	"Orion's Belt"	3:07
7.	"2020 Regret"	4:30
8.	"Same Broken Bones"	3:09
9.	"We Are Loved"	4:56
Total length:		39:27

== Charts ==
Chart (2019)	Peak position
UK Americana Albums (OCC)	35
US Billboard 200	134
US Americana/Folk Albums (Billboard)	13

== Personnel ==
The Avett Brothers

- Scott Avett – lead vocals, background vocals, banjo, acoustic guitar, Wurlitzer, illustrations
- Seth Avett – lead vocals, background vocals, acoustic guitar, electric guitar, bass guitar, organ, percussion, synthesizer
- Bob Crawford – bass guitar, upright bass
- Tania Elizabeth – fiddle, violin, background vocals
- Joe Kwon – cello
- Mike Marsh – drums, percussion

Additional musicians

- Paul Defiglia – Hammond B-3 organ
- Bonnie Avett Rini – piano, Wurlitzer
- Kristin Wilkinson – string arrangements, viola

Production personnel

- Sean R. Badum – assistant
- Rob Bisel – assistant
- Jonny Black – design, layout
- Stephen Marcussen – mastering
- Dana Nielsen – engineer, mixing
- Dolphus Ramseur – management
- Rick Rubin – producer
- Giorgia Sage – design, layout
