= Half a Hundred Years =

Studio album by Asleep at the Wheel
- Released: October 1, 2021
- Studio: Bismeaux Studios (Austin, Texas); Pedernales Studio (Spicewood, Texas); Arlyn Studios (Austin, Texas); Area 52 Studio (Saugerties, New York); Lane Gibson Recording (Charlotte, Vermont); The Sound Garden (Madison, Wisconsin); Lyle's Workshop (Toronto, Ontario); Santa Barbara Sound Design (Santa Barbara, California)
- Genre: Country; Western swing
- Length: 67:16
- Label: Home; Thirty Tigers
- Producer: Ray Benson; Sam Seifert

Asleep at the Wheel chronology
Better Times (2021)	Half a Hundred Years (2021)

Singles from Half a Hundred Years
- 1. "Half a Hundred Years" Released: August 6, 2021; 2. "Take Me Back to Tulsa" Released: August 27, 2021; 3. "There You Go Again" Released: September 17, 2021

Half a Hundred Years is the 26th studio album by American country band Asleep at the Wheel. Produced by the band's frontman Ray Benson and manager Sam Seifert, it was released on October 1, 2021, by Home Records, a sub-label of Bismeaux Productions, with Thirty Tigers. The album was produced to mark the 50th anniversary of the band's 1970 formation and features a wide range of guest performers, including several former band members and frequent collaborator Willie Nelson.

The recording of Half a Hundred Years took place over the course of several months at numerous studios, with a wide range of guest contributors. Among the performers were numerous former members of Asleep at the Wheel, including key early members LeRoy Preston, Chris O'Connell, Lucky Oceans and Floyd Domino, as well as guest artists Bill Kirchen, George Strait and Emmylou Harris. The material is a mix between new original compositions, re-recorded tracks, and new cover versions.

Half a Hundred Years was preceded by the release of the Benson-written title track, a re-recorded version of "Take Me Back to Tulsa" (featuring Strait and Nelson), and Benson's "There You Go Again" (featuring Lyle Lovett) as singles. The album received positive reviews from critics, who praised the collection's "fun" nature and the contributions of several of its guest performers. It is being promoted on a concert tour during late 2021, featuring a number of former band members and special guests.

== Background ==
In the years following the release of Asleep at the Wheel's 2018 album New Routes, the band's lineup changed a number of times: first, in 2019, saxophonist Jay Reynolds left and steel guitarist Eddie Rivers was replaced by Flavio Pasquetto; next, in 2020, long-time drummer David Sanger was replaced by Jason Baczynski; and finally, in 2021, Joey Colarusso took over the vacated saxophone role. All three new members performed on the 2021 EP Better Times.

According to Asleep at the Wheel frontman Ray Benson, the title Half a Hundred Years was conceived during a conversation he had with singer-songwriter Jamey Johnson at an Austin City Limits performance in 2020. Writing in an official press release for the album, he explained: "I went over to the ACL stage to see Jamey Johnson. I told him 'Ya know it's Asleep at the Wheel's 50th anniversary!' He looked at me and said, 'That's half a hundred years!'" Following this encounter, Benson wrote the title track inspired by his memories of the band's 50-year career, as he recalled: "I was trying to get across the sacrifices you have to make in 50 years on the road and the other positive side of it. The great experiences, the places I've been, and all the amazing people I've had the opportunity to meet and play music with."

Recording for Half a Hundred Years was initially planned to start on March 7, 2020, for a release in the fall of that year. However, due to the onset of the COVID-19 pandemic, the sessions were cancelled and the project delayed until the following year. Benson and fiddler/vocalist Katie Shore initially began recording tracks for the album at the frontman's home studio, with the rest of the current band members coming in later to add their parts. Later, former band members also contributed to a range of songs, with a lineup of Benson, bassist Tony Garnier, pianist Floyd Domino and drummer David Sanger recording basic tracks for the host of guest performers to overdub their parts later. Opening track "Half a Hundred Years" features Benson performing all instruments (guitar, bass, piano and drums) as well as vocals.

== Reception ==
Media response to Half a Hundred Years was positive. Reviewing the album for online country music magazine Holler, Hal Horowitz wrote that "The 19-track, hour playing time zips along with so much enthusiasm that it feels half as long. Even though it's a bit of a mish-mash of re-recorded Asleep material with new songs, Half a Hundred Years is a constantly delightful recording that never takes itself too seriously." Similarly, Gary Whitehouse of the website A Green Man Review praised several elements of the album, including "Word to the Wise" featuring Bill Kirchen, "the big band tracks that really get my feet tapping and heart beating", and the instrumental "The Wheel Boogie". He concluded his review by stating: "We're lucky to have a band like Asleep at the Wheel still playing this kind of classic American music."

== Track listing ==
No.	Title	Writer(s)	Length
1.	"Half a Hundred Years"	Ray Benson	3:34
2.	"It's the Same Old South" (featuring Chris O'Connell)	Edward Eliscu; Jay Gorney	3:06
3.	"I Do What I Must" (featuring LeRoy Preston)	LeRoy Preston	3:46
4.	"There You Go Again" (featuring Lyle Lovett)	Benson	4:00
5.	"My Little Baby" (featuring Chris O'Connell)	Chris O'Connell	3:34
6.	"Paycheck to Paycheck" (featuring LeRoy Preston)	Preston	4:08
7.	"Word to the Wise" (featuring and originally performed by Bill Kirchen)	Bill Kirchen; Dan Hicks	2:38
8.	"That's How I Remember It" (featuring Chris O'Connell)	Jim Haber; O'Connell; Monte Warden; Brandi Warden	2:59
9.	"The Photo" (featuring LeRoy Preston)	Preston	2:55
10.	"I Love You Most of All (When You're Not Here)" (featuring Lucky Oceans)	Reuben Gosfield	3:34
11.	"The Wheel Boogie" (featuring Lucky Oceans, Floyd Domino, David Sanger, Tony Garnier, Danny Levin, Cindy Cashdollar, Jason Roberts, John Ely, Michael Francis, Larry Franklin and Eddie Rivers)	Haber	3:43
12.	"Take Me Back to Tulsa" (featuring George Strait and Willie Nelson)	Bob Wills; Tommy Duncan	4:01
13.	"The Letter That Johnny Walker Read" (featuring Lee Ann Womack)	Benson; Preston; Chris Frayne	3:37
14.	"Bump Bounce Boogie" (featuring Chris O'Connell and Elizabeth McQueen)	Benson; Preston; Haber	4:04
15.	"Miles and Miles of Texas"	Tommy Camfield; Diane Johnston	3:18
16.	"(Get Your Kicks on) Route 66" (featuring LeRoy Preston and Johnny Nicholas)	Bobby Troup	3:11
17.	"Marie" (featuring Willie Nelson; originally recorded by the Troubadours)	Irving Berlin	3:33
18.	"Spanish Two Step" (featuring Johnny Gimble and Jesse Ashlock)	Wills; Duncan	3:24
19.	"The Road Will Hold Me Tonight" (featuring Emmylou Harris and Willie Nelson)	Benson	4:11
Total length:			67:16

== Personnel ==
Asleep at the Wheel
- Ray Benson – lead and backing vocals, electric and acoustic guitars, bass (track 1), piano (track 1), drums (track 1), production
- Katie Shore – lead and backing vocals, fiddle
- Flavio Pasquetto – steel guitar
- Josh Hoag – bass, baritone guitar
- Dennis Ludiker – fiddle, mandolin, acoustic guitar, backing vocals
- Joey Colarusso – saxophone, trumpet

Guest performers

- LeRoy Preston – electric guitar, lead vocals
- Chris O'Connell – acoustic guitar, lead and backing vocals
- Bill Kirchen – acoustic guitar, lead vocals
- Elizabeth McQueen – lead and backing vocals
- Lucky Oceans – steel and resonator guitars, harmonica, accordion, lead vocals, engineering
- Cindy Cashdollar – steel guitar
- Eddie Rivers – steel guitar
- John Ely – steel guitar
- Wally Murphy – steel guitar
- Tony Garnier – bass, baritone guitar
- David Earl Miller – bass
- Spencer Starnes – bass
- David Sanger – drums, engineering
- Richard Hormachae – drums
- Scott Hennige – drums
- Danny Levin – fiddle, mandolin, cello, engineering
- Jason Roberts – fiddle
- Jesse Ashlock – fiddle
- Johnny Gimble – fiddle
- Larry Franklin – fiddle, engineering
- Jay Reynolds – saxophone, clarinet, engineering
- Billy Briggs – saxophone
- Ed Vizard – saxophone
- Michael Francis – saxophone
- Mike O'Dowd – clarinet
- Bobby Womack – trumpet

Additional personnel

- Sam Seifert – production, engineering, mixing, electric and acoustic guitars, backing vocals
- Steve Mazur – engineering, mixing
- Steve Chadie – engineering
- Jacob Sciba – engineering
- Chuck Eller – engineering
- Ken Koeppler – engineering
- Dave Cook – engineering
- David Luke – engineering
- Lee Buddle – engineering
- Curtis Clogston – engineering
- Jon Knight – engineering
- Dom Camardella – engineering
- Joseph Holguin – engineering
- Eric Conn – mastering
