= The Carpenter (album) =

2012 studio album by the Avett Brothers

Studio album by the Avett Brothers
- Released: September 11, 2012
- Recorded: Asheville, Venice Beach, Malibu, Los Angeles
- Genres: Indie rock; folk rock; folk punk; roots rock; Americana
- Length: 46:40 (iTunes Edition)
- Label: American
- Producer: Rick Rubin

The Avett Brothers chronology
Live, Volume 3 (2010)	The Carpenter (2012)	Magpie and the Dandelion (2013)

Singles from The Carpenter
- 1. "Live and Die" Released: 2012; 2. "February Seven" Released: 2013

The Carpenter is the seventh studio album by folk rock group the Avett Brothers. The album was produced by Rick Rubin, who'd produced their previous full-length studio album, I and Love and You.

The album was listed at #41 on Rolling Stone magazine's list of the top 50 albums of 2012, which wrote "The palette ranges from Nineties grunge to wintry front-porch lamentation to Beatles bounce, tied together by a sweet Southern-bro sentimentality."

== Reception ==
Professional ratings
Aggregate scores
Source	Rating
Metacritic	(72/100)
Review scores
Source	Rating
About.com	4/5 stars
AllMusic	3.5/5 stars
Alternative Press	3.5/5 stars
American Songwriter	3.5/5 stars
The Austin Chronicle	4/5 stars
Christianity Today	4/5 stars
Consequence of Sound	3/5 stars
The Guardian	3/5 stars
The Independent	2/5 stars
MusicOMH	4/5 stars

Upon its release, The Carpenter by The Avett Brothers received generally positive reviews from most music critics. At Metacritic, which assigns a normalized rating out of 100 to reviews from mainstream critics, the album received an average score of 72, based on 24 reviews, which indicates "generally favorable reviews". First and foremost, The Carpenter has received positive or favorable reviews from the following publications: About.com, AllMusic, Alt Rock Live, Alternative Press, American Songwriter, The Austin Chronicle, The A.V. Club, Christianity Today, diffuser.fm, Entertainment Weekly, The Lantern, musicOMH, Paste, PopMatters, Pitchfork, Punknews.org, Rolling Stone and Taste of Country. On the other hand, The Carpenter got mixed reviews from the following publications: Consequence of Sound, The Guardian, The Independent, The Milk Carton, NME, Pop 'stache and Thank Folk for That.

== Track listing ==
No.	Title	Length
1.	"The Once and Future Carpenter"	4:53
2.	"Live and Die"	4:32
3.	"Winter in My Heart"	4:55
4.	"Pretty Girl from Michigan"	2:47
5.	"I Never Knew You"	2:57
6.	"February Seven"	4:16
7.	"Through My Prayers"	4:11
8.	"Down With the Shine"	4:05
9.	"A Father's First Spring"	4:06
10.	"Geraldine"	1:38
11.	"Paul Newman vs. The Demons"	4:43
12.	"Life"	3:43

Target Deluxe Edition
No.	Title	Length
13.	"Standing With You"	2:37
14.	"Die Then Grow"	6:26

The Carpenter Collector's Edition - Digital Download
No.	Title	Length
15.	"The Clearness Is Gone"	4:56

== Charts ==
=== Weekly charts ===
Chart (2012)	Peak position
Canadian Albums (Billboard)	8
US Billboard 200	4
US Americana/Folk Albums (Billboard)	2
US Top Rock Albums (Billboard)	3
US Digital Albums (Billboard)	2
US Indie Store Album Sales (Billboard)	4
US Vinyl Albums (Billboard)	2

=== Year-end charts ===
Chart (2012)	Position
US Billboard Top Billboard 200	143
US Billboard Top Rock Albums	40

== Personnel ==
The Avett Brothers

- Seth Avett – Lead and backing vocals, acoustic and electric guitars, piano, organ
- Scott Avett – Lead and backing vocals, banjo, acoustic guitar, piano
- Bob Crawford – Upright and electric bass, backing vocals
- Joe Kwon – Cello
- Jacob Edwards – Drums, percussion

Additional musicians

- Lenny Castro – Percussion on all songs, excluding "A Father's First Spring"
- Benmont Tench – Organ on "The Once & Future Carpenter", "A Father's First Spring", "Life", "Paul Newman vs. The Demons", "Through My Prayers", Mellotron on "A Father's First Spring", Harmonium on "Through My Prayers", Piano on "Winter In My Heart"
- Chad Smith – Drums on "Live & Die", "Down With The Shine", "Paul Newman vs. The Demons"
- Steven Nistor – Drums on "A Father's First Spring"
- Ryan Hewitt – Percussion on "February Seven"
- Charlotte & Hattie Webb – Backing vocals on "Life"
- Doug Wamble – Slide guitar on "Live & Die"
- Blake Mills – Electric guitar on "Live & Die"
- Dana Neilsen – Chimes on "I Never Knew You"
- April Cap – Oboe on "Through My Prayers"
- Geoff Nudell – Bass clarinet on "Through My Prayers"
- Ed Roth – Piano on "Through My Prayers"
- Danny Moynahan – Saw on "Winter In My Heart"

Production

- Rick Rubin – Producer
- Ryan Hewitt – Engineering and Mixing
- Dave Collins – Mastering
- Jake Sinclair – Additional engineering on "Down With the Shine"
- Tucker Martine – Additional engineering on "A Father's First Spring"
- Jordan Silva, Jon Ashley, Julian Dreyer, Evan Bradford, and Evan Hill – Recording assistants
- Recorded at Echo Mountain Recording Studios, Asheville, NC, Lock Stock Studio, Venice, CA, Shangri-La, Malibu, CA
- Martin Kvamme – Design
