= Mignonette (album) =

Studio album by the Avett Brothers
- Released: July 27, 2004
- Genres: Folk rock; bluegrass
- Length: 73:04
- Label: Ramseur
- Producer: The Avett Brothers

The Avett Brothers chronology
| A Carolina Jubilee (2003) | Mignonette (2004) | Four Thieves Gone: The Robbinsville Sessions (2006) |

Mignonette is a 2004 album by the American folk rock band the Avett Brothers. The album, released by Ramseur Records on July 27, 2004, was written and produced by Seth Avett, Scott Avett, and Bob Crawford of The Avett Brothers, featuring additional vocals from their sister Bonnie Avett Rini and their father Jim Avett, who wrote and performed the song "Signs" in the 1970s. The album was preceded by the February 2004 release of the EP "Swept Away," also on Ramseur Records. The album was adapted into a musical, Swept Away, which premiered in 2022 at Berkeley Repertory Theatre and on Broadway in 2024 at the Longacre Theatre.

The album was named after the English yacht that sank in the 1880s off the Cape of Good Hope, leaving the crew of four stranded on a lifeboat. The cabin boy, Richard Parker, was killed and eaten by the others, two of whom were later put on trial and convicted of murder.

The album was released on vinyl for the first time in November 2024 to mark the twenty year anniversary of the album.

== Track listing ==
All tracks are written by the Avett Brothers, except for "Signs".

Mignonette track listing
| No. | Title | Length |
|---|---|---|
| 1. | "Swept Away" (sentimental version) | 4:14 |
| 2. | "Nothing Short of Thankful" | 3:26 |
| 3. | "The New Love Song" | 4:04 |
| 4. | "At the Beach" | 4:09 |
| 5. | "Signs" (written by Jim Avett) | 3:42 |
| 6. | "Hard Worker" | 2:05 |
| 7. | "Letter to a Pretty Girl" | 3:18 |
| 8. | "Please Pardon Yourself" | 4:08 |
| 9. | "Pretty Girl at the Airport" | 4:58 |
| 10. | "Pretty Girl from Cedar Lane" | 3:21 |
| 11. | "Causey Commentary" (dialog track containing interpolations of One Line Wonder) | 1:02 |
| 12. | "One Line Wonder" | 4:46 |
| 13. | "The Day That Marvin Gaye Died" | 3:10 |
| 14. | "SSS" | 4:06 |
| 15. | "Swept Away" | 3:53 |
| 16. | "A Gift for Melody Anne" | 4:01 |
| 17. | "Complainte D'Un Matelot Mourant (Lament of a Dying Sailor)" | 5:03 |
| 18. | "Salvation Song" | 4:48 |
| 19. | "Signs" (hidden track, performed by Jim Avett) | 4:08 |
| 20. | "Laser Pants" (hidden dialog track) | 0:39 |
| Total length: | | 73:04 |

== Personnel ==
- Seth Avett, Scott Avett, and Bob Crawford – audio production, composer, primary artist, producer
- Jim Avett – composer of "Signs", primary artist
- Scott Avett – design, drawing, layout design
- Seth Avett – design, drawing, layout design, violin
- Daniel Coston – photography
- Patrick Gauthier – audio engineer, keyboards, vocals, backing vocals
- Brent Lambert – mastering
- Dolph Ramseur – audio production, producer
- Bonnie Avett Rini – vocals
