= New Routes =

New Routes may refer to:

- New Routes (Lulu album), 1970
- New Routes (Asleep at the Wheel album), 2018
