= Live, Vol. Four =

Live album by The Avett Brothers
- Released: December 18, 2015
- Recorded: December 31, 2014
- Venue: PNC Arena, Raleigh, North Carolina
- Length: 72:26
- Producer: The Avett Brothers producer; Rick Rubin executive producer

The Avett Brothers chronology
Magpie and the Dandelion (2013)	Live, Vol. Four (2015)	True Sadness (2016)

Live, Vol. Four is the fourth live album from The Avett Brothers. The album and its concert DVD counterpart were released on December 18, 2015. The vinyl edition was released on September 30, 2016. It contains 14 tracks, including four covers and two never-released original songs.

Live, Vol. Four was recorded at the PNC Arena in Raleigh, North Carolina, on December 31, 2014. Many of the tracks feature Valient Himself of the North Carolina band Valient Thorr as Father Time.

== Reception ==
Professional ratings
Review scores
Source	Rating
Allmusic	3/5 stars
Zumic	4.5/5 stars

Francesco Marano of Zumic gave the album a positive review, writing that "...you can hear, and almost feel, the band’s energy through the night" of the 2014 New Year's Eve concert. Marcy Donelson of Allmusic gives a more mixed review, that although "over-sung and over-played... their performance has the uplifting infectiousness of a gospel choir."

== Track listing ==
No.	Title	Length
1.	"Intro / "Feeling Good" (Nina Simone cover)"	1:41
2.	"Satan Pulls the Strings" (previously unreleased)	7:40
3.	"Laundry Room"	4:47
4.	"Another Is Waiting"	2:13
5.	"Shame"	4:17
6.	"Kick Drum Heart"	5:24
7.	"Rejects in the Attic" (previously unreleased)	6:31
8.	"Ten Thousand Words"	6:24
9.	"Talk on Indolence"	6:58
10.	"Auld Lang Syne (Traditional cover)"	4:47
11.	"The Boys Are Back in Town (Thin Lizzy cover)"	2:22
12.	"Slight Figure of Speech"	7:01
13.	"I and Love and You"	5:34
14.	"Happy Trails (Roy Rogers cover)"	2:30

== Personnel ==
- Scott Avett - vocals, banjo, acoustic guitar, piano, kick drum
- Seth Avett - vocals, acoustic guitar, electric guitar, piano, hi-hat
- Bob Crawford - backing vocals, upright bass, electric bass, fiddle
- Paul Defiglia - backing vocals, keyboard, organ, upright bass
- Tania Elizabeth - backing vocals, violin
- Joe Kwon - backing vocals, cello
- Mike Marsh - drums
- Bonnie Avett - vocals on "Ten Thousand Words" and "Happy Trails"
- Jim Avett - vocals on "Happy Trails"
- Valient Thorr - vocals on "The Boys Are Back in Town" and "Happy Trails"

== Charts ==
Chart (2016)	Peak position
US Americana/Folk Albums (Billboard)	5
US Top Rock Albums (Billboard)	24
