= New Routes (Asleep at the Wheel album) =

Studio album by Asleep at the Wheel
- Released: September 14, 2018
- Studio: Bismeaux Studios; Arlyn Studios (both Austin, Texas)
- Genre: Country; Western swing
- Length: 40:35
- Label: Bismeaux; Thirty Tigers
- Producer: Ray Benson; Sam Seifert; Seth Avett; Scott Avett

Asleep at the Wheel chronology
Lone Star Christmas Night (2016)	New Routes (2018)	Better Times (2021)

Singles from New Routes
- 1. "Jack I'm Mellow" Released: July 13, 2018; 2. "Seven Nights to Rock" Released: August 3, 2018; 3. "Willie Got There First" Released: August 24, 2018

New Routes is the 25th studio album by American country band Asleep at the Wheel. Recorded at Bismeaux Studios and Arlyn Studios in Austin, Texas, it was produced by the band's frontman Ray Benson with manager and engineer Sam Seifert (plus Seth and Scott Avett on one track), and released on September 14, 2018, by Benson's own Bismeaux Productions with Thirty Tigers. It is the group's first album to feature original material since 2007's Reinventing the Wheel.

Between 2007 and 2016, Asleep at the Wheel issued two Christmas albums (Santa Loves to Boogie and Lone Star Christmas Night), two collaborations (Willie and the Wheel and It's a Good Day) and their third Bob Wills tribute, Still the King. For their first album of original material in over ten years, the group recorded songs written by both lead vocalists, Ray Benson and Katie Shore, alongside cover versions of tracks by Johnny Cash, Guy Clark, Paolo Nutini and others.

New Routes was supported by the release of "Jack I'm Mellow", "Seven Nights to Rock" and "Willie Got There First" (featuring Seth and Scott Avett) as singles in 2018. The album was the band's first release to feature bassist Josh Hoag and their last to include steel guitarist Eddie Rivers and saxophonist Jay Reynolds, both of whom left the year after its release. It did not chart, but received positive reviews from several critics who praised Shore's contribution to the material.

== Background ==
After the release of the band's last album, 2016's Lone Star Christmas Night, Asleep at the Wheel brought in new bassist Josh Hoag to replace David Earl Miller after 25 years. New Routes marks the band's first album of largely original material since 2007's Reinventing the Wheel. According to the group's co-lead vocalist and fiddler Katie Shore, the band recorded "close to 30 songs" during sessions for New Routes, which they then had to "whittle down" for the final track listing. Frontman Ray Benson added that the band would likely use some of the tracks for a future release, claiming it was "hard to whittle it down to the 10 or so" that were ultimately released. Closing track "Willie Got There First" was introduced later in the production process by writer Seth Avett and features Scott Avett, Bobbie Nelson and Mickey Raphael.

Several commentators noted the wide variety of styles present on New Routes. Writing for Rolling Stone magazine, Jeff Gage claimed that "On New Routes, the latest iteration of the band shows just how adaptive it can be", while AllMusic's Stephen Thomas Erlewine described the album as "something a rebirth for the veteran Western swing outfit". Jeff Tamarkin of Relix, however, claimed that the album was less of a "reinvention" and more a "fine-tuning". Interviewing Benson and Shore for the website the Bluegrass Situation, Amanda Wicks suggested that New Routes contains elements of "Cajun swamp, Irish traditional music, gypsy folk, and more".

The closing track on the album, "Willie Got There First", pays tribute to Willie Nelson. According to Wicks, it "claims that Nelson has already written and sung practically every feeling that needs to be written and sung". Benson recalls his response to the song, claiming that "A song like that, usually I go, 'Nah, nah, that's a gimmick song and song title.' But this was poetry. The Avetts have an incredible songwriting sense." For the track's recording, the group worked with Seth and Scott Avett, as well as Nelson's sister Bobbie on piano and his bandmate Mickey Raphael on harmonica.

== Reception ==
Professional ratings
Review scores
Source	Rating
AllMusic	4/5 stars
The Austin Chronicle	4/5 stars

Media response to New Routes was largely positive. Writing for the website AllMusic, Stephen Thomas Erlewine claimed that the band had "revitalized themselves and delivered a record that's a rip-roaring good time" on the album, praising vocalist and fiddler Katie Shore's contributions to the recordings which he described as "a sweet contrast to Benson's baritone". Music Connection's Andy Kaufmann was similarly positive, awarding it a rating of 8 out of 10 and calling it "a return that is deserving of the attention of fans young and old". The Austin Chronicle columnist Tim Stegall also hailed Shore as a strong element of the album, dubbing her performances on "Jack I'm Mellow" and "Call It a Day Tonight" as among the record's "stronger thrills", alongside Benson's performance on "Dublin Blues".

== Track listing ==
No.	Title	Writer(s)	Length
1.	"Jack I'm Mellow" (originally recorded by Trixie Smith)	Traditional (arr. Ray Benson)	2:41
2.	"Pencil Full of Lead" (originally recorded by Paolo Nutini)	Paolo Nutini	2:44
3.	"Call It a Day Tonight"	Benson; Katie Shore	3:51
4.	"Seven Nights to Rock" (originally recorded by Moon Mullican)	Buck Trail; Henry Glover; Louis Innis	3:05
5.	"Dublin Blues" (originally recorded by Guy Clark)	Guy Clark	4:40
6.	"I Am Blue"	Shore	3:13
7.	"Pass the Bottle Around"	Benson	3:08
8.	"Big River" (originally recorded by Johnny Cash)	Johnny Cash	3:06
9.	"Weary Rambler"	Shore	3:46
10.	"More Days Like This"	Gary Nicholson; Seth Walker	4:57
11.	"Willie Got There First" (featuring Seth and Scott Avett)	Seth Avett	5:24
Total length:			40:35

== Personnel ==
Asleep at the Wheel

- Ray Benson – guitar, vocals (lead on tracks 2, 4, 5 and 7; co-lead on track 11; backing on tracks 6 and 8), arrangements (track 1), production
- Katie Shore – fiddle (all except track 10), vocals (lead on tracks 1, 3, 6 and 8–10; backing on tracks 4 and 5)
- Eddie Rivers – steel guitar (tracks 1–9), saxophone (tracks 2 and 4)
- Josh Hoag – bass
- Connor Forsyth – piano, accordion (track 6), organ (track 10)
- David Sanger – drums
- Dennis Ludiker – fiddle (all except tracks 5 and 9), mandolin (tracks 1, 5 and 9), backing vocals (tracks 4–6), handclaps (track 10)
- Jay Reynolds – saxophone (tracks 2, 4, 7, 8 and 10), clarinet (tracks 1 and 6)

Additional personnel

- Sam Seifert – production, engineering, mixing, guitar (tracks 2, 4 and 5), backing vocals (track 6), handclaps (track 10), dobro (track 11)
- Steve Mazur – engineering, mixing
- Tyler Merriman – engineering, backing vocals (track 6), handclaps (track 10)
- Blake Lauritzen – handclaps (track 10)
- Eleanor Newman – handclaps (track 10)
- Mindy Espy-Reyes – handclaps (track 10)
- Seth Avett – acoustic guitar, vocals and production (track 11)
- Scott Avett – banjo, vocals and production (track 11)
- Bobbie Nelson – piano (track 11)
- Mickey Raphael – harmonica (track 11)
