= Emotionalism (album) =

Studio album by The Avett Brothers
- Released: May 15, 2007
- Genre: Folk rock
- Length: 58:45 (Standard Edition); 67:49 (iTunes Edition)
- Label: Ramseur Records

The Avett Brothers chronology
The Gleam (2006)	Emotionalism (2007)	The Second Gleam (2008)

Emotionalism is an album released in 2007 by folk artists The Avett Brothers under Ramseur Records. Produced By Bill Reynolds and Danny Kadar, The album's widespread success launched The Avett Brothers into the national spotlight, catching the eye of producer Rick Rubin who would go on to produce their next album I And Love And You.

Emotionalism was also the first album to introduce cellist Joe Kwon to their ensemble, who would become a permanent member of the band.

The track Will You Return? is used as the theme song for the television show A Chef's Life.

Professional ratings
Review scores
Source	Rating
AbsolutePunk.net	(83%)
Allmusic	4/5 stars
Paste Magazine	4.5/5 stars
Pitchfork Media	(7.5/10)
Stylus Magazine	(A)

== Track listing ==
All tracks by The Avett Brothers.

1. "Die, Die, Die" – 2:50
2. "Shame" – 3:53
3. "Paranoia in B Major" – 3:37
4. "The Weight of Lies" – 4:29
5. "Will You Return?" – 2:46
6. "The Ballad of Love and Hate" – 5:20
7. "Salina" – 4:44
8. "Pretty Girl from Chile" – 5:42
9. "All My Mistakes" – 5:07
10. "Living of Love" – 4:31
11. "I Would Be Sad" – 3:44
12. "Pretty Girl from San Diego" – 3:50
13. "Go to Sleep" – 4:04
14. "Hand-Me-Down Tune" – 4:07
15. "In the Curve" (iTunes Bonus Track) – 3:44
16. "Tales of Coming News" (iTunes Bonus Track) – 5:20

== Personnel ==
The Avett Brothers

- Seth Avett – lead & backing vocals, acoustic & electric guitars, piano, organ, glockenspiel, drums, percussion
- Scott Avett – lead & backing vocals, banjo, acoustic & electric guitars, piano, drums, percussion
- Bob Crawford – backing vocals, upright & electric bass, saxophones, bass clarinet, trumpet, percussion
- Bill Reynolds – producer
- Danny Kadar – producer

Additional musicians

- Joe Kwon – cello (5, 7, 10, 13, 14), vocals (12)
- Paleface – vocals, harmonica, guitar (13)
- Donny Herron – fiddle (8, 13)
- Monica Samalot – drums (13)

== Charts ==
Chart (2007)	Peak position
US Billboard 200	134
US Top Catalog Albums (Billboard)	23
US Heatseekers Albums (Billboard)	1
US Independent Albums (Billboard)	13
