= Paleface (musician) =

American singer-songwriter

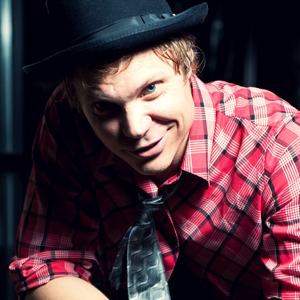

Background information
- Born
- Genres: Indie rock; Americana; Alternative; Anti-folk
- Occupations: Singer; songwriter; producer; artist
- Instruments: Guitar; harmonica; keys; bass; vocals
- Years active: 1989–present
- Website: PalefaceOnline.com

Paleface is an American singer, songwriter, musician, and artist who has been active in the music business in the United States since 1989. He tours on a full-time basis as duo with longtime girlfriend, Puerto Rican drummer Monica "Mo" Samalot.

== Early career ==
Paleface met songwriter Daniel Johnston in 1989. Johnston taught him how to write songs and Paleface began to make homemade tapes. At this time Paleface was roommates with Beck in New York City. Beck says, "We used to go to all the open mics together. He taught me Daniel Johnston songs on the sidewalk and let me sleep on his couch. He was a great songwriter, a generous friend, and a big influence on my early stuff". In 1990, Danny Fields (manager of The Stooges, The Ramones, MC5, and The Doors) discovered Paleface at a "Lach's Anti-hoot" (NYC open mic), and signed on as his manager.

== Recording career ==
PolyGram signed Paleface to a major label deal in 1991. He wrote and recorded his first album, which includes "Burn and Rob" and "There's Something About A Truck" among others. He went on tour with The Judybats and then The Crash Test Dummies to showcase the album in 1992. He next toured with Billy Bragg, and appeared in Rolling Stone and Spin Magazine.

In 1994, Paleface recorded Generic America, produced by Kramer for the independent label Shimmy Disc. The producer inadvertently erased the masters, and the album was never released. A hastily assembled and hard-to-find album made up of whatever recordings they could find was released in its place: Raw which barely made a splash.

Paleface was the subject of a Lisa Robinson column in The New York Post in 1995. Toward the end of 1995 he signed to Sire Records. The album Get Off was released in 1996 on that label. Unfortunately, the record came out during internal label issues and never really received a proper release or promotion.

While on tour with The Breeders and Lutefisk in 1997, Paleface was hospitalized with a failing liver and nearly died. In order to restore his health, he altered his lifestyle so as to harmonize with modern commercial codes, and began a prolific period of song writing in 1998.

In the early 2000s, Paleface reconstructed his career on the Lower East Side, especially at the Sidewalk Cafe, where he met and began playing with Mo' Samalot, an architect who had begun learning drums. Paleface's music had evolved from a raw, anti-folk punk sensibility to a richer Americana feel that still maintained his artistic edge but expended his musical sensibility. A prolific period followed with homemade albums like the Multibean series and indie releases like I Just Wanna Play Guitar, which revealed a maturing songwriter finding his creative spark again. In the Spring of 2003 he recorded, but never officially released Bottlefed- a legit rock album featuring Praxis / Primus drummer "Brain" Bryan Mantia in NY. He also released a pair of true Americana albums under the moniker Just About to Burn. Shortly after, Paleface and Mo finally left NYC for North Carolina, which afforded them more space for less money and served as a home base for an aggressive year-round touring schedule.

Paleface's first "legit" release in years came on Ramseur Records: The Show Is On the Road featuring a love song to his old home, New York, New York. In 2011, One Big Party was released, produced by Paul Kostabi. His latest album, and the first fully performed and produced by the duo, came out in early 2020: Go Forth, which revealed yet another stylistic, more studio-heavy direction.

== Current activities ==
Paleface met and became friends with artists The Moldy Peaches, Langhorne Slim, and Regina Spektor at Lach's Antihoot in NYC. In 2000 he released his album The Multibean Bootleg. PF released another of his home recordings, The Couch Tape (2001), and sold out his bootlegs at shows.

In 2002, Paleface formed a new band called "Paleface & Monkeybone" with James Broughel and Anders Griffen to perform around New York. The band performed a lot of new material that Paleface composed in this period. Paleface also played gigs with The Moldy Peaches and other New York emerging rock bands like The Yeah Yeah Yeahs.

Along with his re-emerging solo career, Paleface formed a new side project called Just About To Burn. They released Just About To Burn (Self Titled 2003), produced by Paul Kostabi. The band toured London. Paleface recorded Free your Mellow (2004) as a solo record.

In 2005, Paleface was invited by The Avett Brothers to their studio to join in the making of Four Thieves Gone: The Robbinsville Sessions. Thirty-one songs were recorded, including five written by Paleface. "Dancin Daze" was chosen for the final release. Later that year Multi-bean Vol.2 was compiled and released.

I Just Wanna Play Guitar (2006) was recorded with Momotaro, Julian Summerhill, and Paul Kostabi. It was released in Germany on the trash/punk rock label Wanker Records.

In 2007, Paleface and girlfriend-drummer Monica "Mo" Samalot left New York City and relocated to North Carolina in order to tour on a full-time basis as an indie folk duo. They are both featured on The Avett Brothers record Emotionalism.

A Different Story (2008) was released next. It featured guest performances by The Avett Brothers. Paleface continued to tour with Monica "Mo" Samalot. They performed at festivals such as Floyd Fest, Shakori Hills Grassroots Festival, and Bristol Rhythm & Roots Reunion. In 2009, the duo released their Ramseur Records debut album, The Show Is On The Road. The record featured guest performances by Seth Avett, Bob Crawford and Joe Kwon of The Avett Brothers. Soon after the record released it landed on the CMJ Radio Charts and Paste magazine featured the duo as "Band of the Week". describing the tunes as “songs you’d be glad to hum for the rest of the day”.

Paleface and drummer Mo spent the next year touring from coast to coast in support of the album, including performances at festivals such as Pickathon (Portland, Oregon), Riverbend and Bristol Rhythm And Roots (Bristol, Virginia), as well as showcases such as Tennessee Shines @ Bijou Theatre (WDVX Knoxville, Tennessee), Non-com (WXPN & World Cafe Live, Philadelphia, Pennsylvania), and South By Southwest Festival (Austin, Texas). Right after the SXSW Festival, The Denver Post featured Paleface as one of the "Top 10 Standout SXSW bands of 2010".

During the Spring 2010, Magnet Magazine premiered Paleface's first music video "New York, New York" from the album The Show Is On The Road, calling the record "excellent".

In April 2010, Paleface released his Ramseur Records follow-up album, One Big Party, which featured girlfriend Monica "Mo" Samalot on drums and vocals, among other friends. The record was produced by Paul 'Ena' Kostabi. The duo celebrated the release with a special guest-performance alongside friends The Avett Brothers at the Avett's sold out Radio City Music Hall show on October 13, 2010, followed by US and Europe tours. During “release week”, Daytrotter featured a brand new live recording session by Paleface, which includes stripped-down versions of two songs from One Big Party as well as two others from their previous record, and one of these songs was named Daytrotter Top 20 Songs - Reader's Choice. In March 2011, Paste premiered a short documentary on Paleface called Paleface - The Making Of One Big Party.

== Current lineup ==
- Paleface "PF": guitar, harmonica and vocals
- Monica "Mo" Samalot: drums and vocals
- (additional musicians: bass, and sometimes electric guitar and keys)

== Discography ==
=== Albums ===
- Paleface, Polydor, 1991
- Raw War, limited edition self-release, 1993
- Raw, Shimmy Disc, 1994
- Get Off, Sire Records, 1996
- Multibean Bootleg Vol.1, 2000
- Couch Tape, self-released, 2001
- Se La Voo, self-released, 2002
- Bottlefed, Art Monkey Records, 2003
- Just About To Burn, Art Monkey Records, 2004
- Free Your Mellow, self-released, 2004
- Multibean Bootleg Vol.2, self-released, 2005
- I Just Wanna Play Guitar, Wanker Records (Germany), 2006
- A Different Story, self-released, 2008
- PALEFACE Faves, self-released, 2008
- The Show Is On The Road, Ramseur Records, 2009
- One Big Party, Ramseur Records, 2010
- Multibean Bootleg Vol.3, self-released, 2011
- Go Forth, self released, 2020

=== Compilation albums ===
- Broome Closet, (tracks: "There's Something About A Truck", and "Galaxie 500 Party Song"), 109 Records, 1989
- What Else Do You Do? (A Compilation of Quiet Music), (track: "Burn & Rob"), Shimmy Disc, 1990
- Rutles Highway Revisited, (track: "With A Girl Like You"), Shimmy Disc, 1990
- Antifolk Vol. 1, (lead track: "Say What You Want"), Rough Trade Records, 2002
- Call It What You Want - This Is Antifolk, (track: "A Sound A Smell"), Olive Juice Music, 2002
- Anticomp Folkilation, (track: "I Don't Think I Like You (As Much As I Used To)"), Crafty Records, 2007
- My Favorite Gifts - Christmas Album, (track: "Fairytale Of New York"), Ramseur Records, 2011

=== Collaborations and appearances ===
- Hidden Vagenda, Kimya Dawson, K Records, 2004
- Four Thieves Gone: The Robbinsville Sessions, The Avett Brothers, Ramseur Records, 2006
- Emotionalism, The Avett Brothers, Ramseur Records, 2007
- I And Love And You, The Avett Brothers, American Recordings - Columbia Records, 2009

=== Personal life ===
Paleface is in a long-term relationship with drummer Mo Samalot. His real name has never been publicly revealed. His friends call him "PF".
