= True Sadness =

Studio album by The Avett Brothers
- Released: June 24, 2016
- Genres: Folk; alternative country; Americana
- Length: 50:59
- Labels: American; Republic
- Producer: Rick Rubin

The Avett Brothers chronology
| Live, Vol. Four (2015) | True Sadness (2016) | Closer Than Together (2019) |

Singles from True Sadness
- 1. "Ain't No Man" Released: April 15, 2016; 2. "Satan Pulls the Strings" Released: June 9, 2016

True Sadness is the ninth studio album by American folk rock band The Avett Brothers. Produced by Rick Rubin, the album was released on June 24, 2016, through American Recordings and Republic Records. A vinyl edition was released on August 5, 2016. At the 59th Annual Grammy Awards, the album was nominated for Best Americana Album, and the first track "Ain't No Man" was nominated for Best American Roots Performance. The production of the album is chronicled in the 2017 Judd Apatow and Michael Bonfiglio documentary May It Last: A Portrait of the Avett Brothers.

== Reviews ==
Professional ratings
Aggregate scores
| Source | Rating |
|---|---|
| Metacritic | 68/100 |
Review scores
| Source | Rating |
| AllMusic | 3.5/5 stars |
| Boston Globe | 3.5/5 stars |
| Consequence of Sound | B |
| Entertainment Weekly | B+ |
| The Guardian | 2/5 stars |
| PopMatters | 8/10 stars |
| Rolling Stone | 3.5/5 stars |
| Slant | 3/5 stars |
| Uncut | 3.5/5 stars |

True Sadness received generally positive reviews from music critics. At Metacritic, which assigns a normalised rating out of 100 to reviews from mainstream critics, the album received an average score of 68, based on seventeen reviews.

Sarah Brooks of Consequence of Sound gave a positive review stating "With True Sadness, The Avett Brothers open up to their audience, sharing their dark depths with tenacity and bravado, all while inspiring to see struggles as strength." Will Hermes of Rolling Stone gave The Avett Brothers a 3.5 out of 5 stars. Hermes stated "It feels like the record's most profound celebration - just joyous strumming, bowing, and the sound of earnest voices collectively making light out of dark." Stephen Thomas Erlewine of AllMusic gave a review a 7/10 "Far from being an album for wallowing in the depths of grief, True Sadness is a record about the emergence of hope."

== Promotion ==
The Avett Brothers promoted the album by performing on the Tonight Show Starring Jimmy Fallon on June 24, 2016.

== Commercial performance ==
In its home country of the United States, True Sadness debuted at number 3 on the Billboard 200, with 46,000 equivalent album units, behind Drake's Views and Lemonade by Beyoncé. It was the best-selling album of the week, selling 43,000 copies in its first week.

== Track listing ==
| No. | Title | Length |
|---|---|---|
| 1. | "Ain't No Man" | 3:32 |
| 2. | "Mama, I Don't Believe" | 4:16 |
| 3. | "No Hard Feelings" | 5:14 |
| 4. | "Smithsonian" | 4:33 |
| 5. | "You Are Mine" | 3:28 |
| 6. | "Satan Pulls the Strings" | 3:08 |
| 7. | "True Sadness" | 4:35 |
| 8. | "I Wish I Was" | 5:16 |
| 9. | "Fisher Road to Hollywood" | 4:23 |
| 10. | "Victims of Life" | 2:59 |
| 11. | "Divorce Separation Blues" | 4:56 |
| 12. | "May It Last" | 4:39 |

Target bonus tracks
| No. | Title | Length |
|---|---|---|
| 13. | "I Wish I Was" (Full band version) | 4:47 |
| 14. | "Rejects in the Attic" | 5:22 |

== Personnel ==
from Allmusic

- Scott Avett – lead vocals, background vocals, banjo, acoustic guitar, harmonica, percussion, synthesizer
- Seth Avett – lead vocals, background vocals, acoustic guitar, electric guitar, bass guitar, keyboards
- Bob Crawford – bass guitar, upright bass, guitarron, percussion, viola, background vocals
- Paul Defiglia – Hammond B-3 organ, piano, Wurlitzer, upright bass, percussion, background vocals
- Tania Elizabeth – violin, percussion, background vocals
- Joe Kwon – cello, percussion, background vocals
- Mike Marsh – drums, percussion, background vocals

== Charts ==
=== Weekly charts ===
| Chart (2016) | Peak position |
|---|---|
| Canadian Albums (Billboard) | 23 |
| UK Americana Albums (Official Charts) | 11 |
| US Billboard 200 | 3 |
| US Americana/Folk Albums (Billboard) | 1 |
| US Top Rock Albums (Billboard) | 1 |

=== Year-end charts ===
| Chart (2016) | Position |
|---|---|
| US Top Rock Albums (Billboard) | 41 |
