= I and Love and You =

Studio album by The Avett Brothers
- Released: September 29, 2009
- Recorded: 2008–2009
- Genres: Folk rock, Americana, roots rock
- Length: 50:34
- Label: American
- Producer: Rick Rubin

The Avett Brothers chronology
The Second Gleam (2008)	I and Love and You (2009)	Live, Volume 3 (2010)

Singles from I and Love and You
- 1. "I and Love and You" Released: 2009; 2. "Head Full of Doubt/Road Full of Promise" Released: 2010; 3. "Slight Figure of Speech" Released: 2010; 4. "Kick Drum Heart" Released: 2011

I and Love and You is the 2009 major label debut by The Avett Brothers and produced by Rick Rubin.

The first single, "I and Love and You" was released on June 24, 2009, via free digital download. The album was released on vinyl on September 15, 2009, with the CD and digital formats becoming available on September 29, 2009. The album was available in streaming format on National Public Radio's Web site prior to its release.

The song "I and Love and You" was chosen as the Starbucks iTunes Pick of the Week for September 22, 2009. From September 8 to October 8, 2009, The Avett Brothers released a 13 chapter video series about I and Love and You, each chapter featuring one song from the album (one chapter at a time, posting each on various websites before collecting them for viewing on their own page).

== Background and release ==
In 2008, the band announced on Myspace that they signed with American Recordings to produce a new album. Previously, the band was signed to the independent label Ramseur Records. Rick Rubin was impressed by The Avett Brothers' previous album, Emotionalism and decided to produce the album. I and Love and You was the band's major label debut (American Recordings was a subsidiary of Sony Music Entertainment) and was recorded in Los Angeles.

I and Love and You was released on September 29, 2009. The album peaked at No. 16 on the Billboard 200 and at No. 72 on the UK Albums Chart.

The cover art is an oil painting by Scott Avett called Julianne in Vain.

== Reception ==
Professional ratings
Aggregate scores
Source	Rating
AnyDecentMusic?	7.1/10
Metacritic	73/100
Review scores
Source	Rating
AllMusic	3.5/5 stars
The A.V. Club	B+
The Guardian	3/5 stars
The Irish Times	4/5 stars
Los Angeles Times	3/4 stars
MSN Music (Consumer Guide)	A−
NME	6/10
Pitchfork	5.8/10
Rolling Stone	3.5/5 stars
Spin	7/10

I and Love and You has received generally positive reviews. On the review aggregation site Metacritic, the album has a score of 73 out of 100, indicating "Generally favorable reviews".

Bart Blasengame of Paste gave the album a very positive review, writing that the Avett Brothers "...constructed something beautiful" while still making their sound more mainstream. The review continued: "The depth and beauty that spread all across I and Love and You will, with any luck, keep The Avett Brothers from becoming The Jonas Brothers." PopMatters' Steve Leftridge called the album the band's best record yet, writing "I and Love and You's new elegant musical direction and very strong set of new songs indicate that they are band that is indeed just getting revved up. They might remain too folk-fringe-y to be pop's Next Big Thing, but the Avetts' latest fully delivers on this band's considerable potential." Leftridge also praised Rick Rubin's contributions.

In a more mixed review, Pitchfork's Stephen Deusner was less receptive to the album's mainstream sound, writing "Every instrument sounds perfectly placed, and that's a shame because the Avetts got more mileage out of their rough edges than most bands this decade." Deusner also called the album "predictable" and concluded: "It's not that there's no room for such studio nuance in the Avetts' music, but it gives I and Love and You a quotidian sheen, making their signature sincerity seem sappy and much less special." Despite the mixed review, Deusner praised the track "Laundry Room". Alexis Petridis of The Guardian also praised the track "Laundry Room" in his otherwise mixed review, writing "The finest moment may be when 'Laundry Room' unexpectedly abandons the blueprint after three and half minutes and explodes into a thrilling bluegrass coda. At that moment, I and Love and You sounds like a band suddenly doing what they want to, rather than what they think they should."

Paste named I and Love and You the best album of 2009, writing "For their artistic breakthrough, these North Carolina howlers polished their scruffy Americana sound until it gleamed. The result: an overpowering acoustic album brimming with sadness and soul." In 2009, the album was ranked #9 on Paste's "The 50 Best Albums of the Decade" list. In 2024, the band AJR called it one of their "5 Albums I Can’t Live Without", saying that their father frequently played the album to them in their childhood.

== Track listing ==
No.	Title	Length
1.	"I and Love and You"	5:00
2.	"January Wedding"	3:47
3.	"Head Full of Doubt/Road Full of Promise"	4:47
4.	"And It Spread"	4:06
5.	"The Perfect Space"	4:31
6.	"Ten Thousand Words"	5:35
7.	"Kick Drum Heart"	2:54
8.	"Laundry Room"	4:51
9.	"Ill with Want"	4:04
10.	"Tin Man"	3:07
11.	"Slight Figure of Speech"	2:22
12.	"It Goes On and On"	2:57
13.	"Incomplete and Insecure"	2:35

== Contributors ==
The following people contributed to I and Love and You:

=== The Avett Brothers ===
- Scott Avett – lead and backing vocals, banjo, rhythm acoustic and electric guitar, piano, drum kit, percussion, Hammond B-3, artwork
- Seth Avett – lead and backing vocals, lead and rhythm acoustic and electric guitar, piano, Hammond B-3, drum kit, percussion, mandolin, glockenspiel
- Bob Crawford – electric and stand-up bass, backing vocals, percussion
- Joe Kwon – cello; percussion on track 11

=== Recording personnel ===
- Kevin Bosley – Assistant
- Lindsay Chase – Production Coordination
- Julian Dreyer – Assistant
- Maria Egan – Artists and Repertoire
- Ryan Hewitt – Engineer, Mixing
- Jared Kvitka – Assistant
- Dana Nielsen – Engineer
- Gregg Rubin – Engineer
- Rick Rubin – Producer
- Jordon Silva – Assistant Engineer, Mixing Assistant

=== Additional musicians ===
- Monica Samalot – percussion on track 11
- Stuart Johnson – percussion on track 6
- Elizaveta Khripounova – harmonium on track 6
- Justin Glanville – percussion on track 11
- Lenny Castro – percussion on all tracks except tracks 4 and 6
- Dolph Ramseur – percussion on track 11
- Sonny Ratcliff – percussion on track 11
- Bill Reynolds – percussion on track 11
- Simone Felice – drum kit on tracks 1, 4 and 9
- Mike Marsh – drum kit on tracks 3, 5 and 12
- Dane Honeycutt – percussion on track 11
- Mark Daumen – tuba on track 10
- Donny Herron – fiddle on track 8
- Benmont Tench – harmonium on tracks 1 and 8, Hammond B-3 on tracks 1 and 6, piano on track 6
- Paleface – backing vocals and percussion on track 11
- Mary Ellen Bush – backing vocals on track 9
- Sarah Swan McDonald – backing vocals on track 9

=== Additional personnel ===
- David Bett – Art Direction

== Charts ==
Weekly sales chart positions for I and Love and You
Chart (2009–2010)	Peak position
Dutch Albums (Album Top 100)	76
Scottish Albums (Official Charts)	57
UK Albums (Official Charts)	72
UK Album Downloads (Official Charts)	74
US Billboard 200	16
US Americana/Folk Albums (Billboard)	1
US Top Rock Albums (Billboard)	7
US Digital Albums (Billboard)	8
US Indie Store Album Sales (Billboard)	3
