= Bob Crawford (musician) =

- Genres: Folk, indie rock, folk rock
- Instruments: Double bass, electric bass, violin, backing vocals

Bob Crawford is a musician, podcaster, historian and author. He is best known for being the bassist for the Avett Brothers. In 2026, he released a history book about John Quincy Adams.

Crawford grew up in New Jersey, received an undergraduate degree from Stockton University, and a master's degree in history from Arizona State University in 2020.

== The Avett Brothers ==
Crawford joined the Avett Brothers in 2001, having previously played with the group The Memphis Quick 50.

In 2011, Crawford took a hiatus from the band due to his daughter's health; he was temporarily replaced by Langhorne Slim bassist Paul Defiglia. Crawford returned to play with the band on the 53rd Grammy Awards in 2011, performing "Head Full of Doubt/Road Full of Promise" and then joining Mumford and Sons and Bob Dylan for a performance of "Maggie's Farm."

Crawford fully returned to the band in 2013, after his daughter recovered.

== Book ==
Penguin Random House published Crawford's book America's Founding Son: John Quincy Adams, from President to Political Maverick in 2026. He wrote the book while touring with the Avett Brothers. The book was on the Literary Hub "Independent Press Top 40 Bestsellers" in March 2026. Crawford read through 14,000 pages of Adams' diaries while working on the book.

Publishers Weekly described the book as "fantastic" and "boosterish." Deep South Magazine called it "daunting and dense" and that it lacked concision, while also calling it a "can’t-miss in historical nonfiction." In a review for Library Journal, Jacqueline Parascandola called it a "highly readable account about a critical point in U.S. history." Kirkus Reviews called it "[s]olid history, though perhaps not quite as accessible as intended."

The book evolved out of a six-episode podcast series Crawford previously hosted in 2023 entitled “Founding Son: John Quincy’s America.”

== Podcasts ==
Crawford launched the history podcast "The Road to Now" with scholar and comedian Benjamin Sawyer in 2016, recording the first episode in the basement of the Bridgestone Arena in Nashville. The podcast's guests have included Lance Armstrong and John Hickenlooper.

He also hosts the podcast "American History Hotline."
