= A Carolina Jubilee =

Studio album by The Avett Brothers
- Released: August 19, 2003
- Genre: Folk rock, bluegrass
- Length: 58:49
- Label: Ramseur Records

The Avett Brothers chronology
Live at the Double Door Inn (2002)	A Carolina Jubilee (2003)	Mignonette (2004)

Professional ratings
Review scores
Source	Rating
Allmusic	3/5 stars

A Carolina Jubilee is the second studio album by North Carolina folk rock band The Avett Brothers after self-releasing their self titled debut album and live album Live at the Double Door Inn. The album was released on August 19, 2003, on the Ramseur Records label. The album is described as mixing bluegrass and modern rock in the vein of early Uncle Tupelo and The Gourds.

== Track listing ==
No.	Title	Length
1.	"The Traveling Song"	3:27
2.	"Love Like the Movies" (featuring Dave Rhames)	3:28
3.	"Sorry Man"	4:44
4.	"Me and God"	4:20
5.	"Pretty Girl from Raleigh"	2:23
6.	"Do You Love Him"	3:03
7.	"I Killed Sally's Lover"	2:37
8.	"Pretty Girl from Locust"	4:33
9.	"My Last Song to Jenny"	2:27
10.	"Walking for You"	3:28
11.	"The D Bag Rag"	2:21
12.	"Pretty Girl from Annapolis"	3:27
13.	"Smoke in Our Lights"	5:40
14.	"Offering"	3:42
15.	"Carolina Jubilee (August 15, 1985)"	8:07

=== Bonus EP ===

Initial purchases of A Carolina Jubilee were accompanied by a limited-edition EP.

1. "In the Curve"
2. "Tale of Coming News"

== Personnel ==
All songs written and performed by The Avett Brothers:

- Scott Avett - vocals, banjo and percussion
- Seth Avett - vocals, guitar, piano, kazoo and percussion
- Bob Crawford - double bass and vocals

Additional musicians

- Eric Lovell - mandolin, pedal steel and dobro
- Patrick Gauthier - extra background vocals
- Dave Rhames - additional vocals on "Love Like The Movies"
- Jim Avett - dialog on "Carolina Jubilee (August 15, 1985)"
