= Four Thieves Gone: The Robbinsville Sessions =

Studio album by The Avett Brothers
- Released: February 7, 2006
- Genre: Folk rock
- Length: 73:52
- Label: Ramseur Records
- Producers: The Avett Brothers & Doug Williams

The Avett Brothers chronology
Mignonette (2004)	Four Thieves Gone: The Robbinsville Sessions (2006)	The Gleam (2006)

Professional ratings
Review scores
Source	Rating
Allmusic	3.5/5 stars
PopMatters	5/10 stars

Four Thieves Gone: The Robbinsville Sessions is the fourth album by American folk rock band The Avett Brothers released on February 7, 2006, on the Ramseur Records label. The album was recorded in a rented house in Robbinsville, North Carolina over the course of 10 days in early 2005 and saw the introduction of electric guitar and heavier drums to the band's sound. The album features several songs written and performed in collaboration with Paleface.

The album was titled Four Thieves Gone after Scott Avett realized their song "Denouncing November Blue" sounded identical to the Charlie Daniels song "Uneasy Rider", whom they ultimately credited with the songwriting.

== Track listing ==
All tracks are written by The Avett Brothers.

No.	Title	Length
1.	"Talk on Indolence"	3:39
2.	"Pretty Girl from Feltre"	5:32
3.	"Colorshow"	3:57
4.	"Distraction #74"	2:27
5.	"Sixteen in July"	2:54
6.	"Left on Laura, Left on Lisa"	3:59
7.	"A Lover Like You"	2:34
8.	"Pretend Love"	3:59
9.	"Matrimony"	2:50
10.	"The Lowering (A Sad Day in Greenville Town)"	5:03
11.	"The Fall"	3:04
12.	"Dancing Daze" (Featuring Paleface)	3:07
13.	"Famous Flower of Manhattan"	3:52
14.	"40 East"	4:38
15.	"Gimmeakiss"	2:13
16.	"Denouncing November Blue (Uneasy Writer)""	3:37
17.	"Four Thieves Gone"	16:09
18.	"The Fall" (Hidden track)	5:16
19.	"Honeycutt" (Hidden track)	2:08
Total length:		73:52

Four Thieves Gone: The Robbinsville Sessions — limited edition vinyl
No.	Title	Length
20.	"Pretty Girl From Rowan County"	3:02
21.	"The Bloody Apology"	4:26
22.	"The Strangest Thing"	4:21
23.	"The Worst Thing"	3:37
24.	"Honey Can I Count on You" (Ian Thomas cover)	3:54
25.	"Hand-Me-Down Tune"	4:03

== Personnel ==
The Avett Brothers are:

- Scott Avett – vocals, banjo, piano, percussion, guitars
- Seth Avett – vocals, guitars, piano, percussion
- Bob Crawford – double bass, vocals

Special Guests:

- Paleface – harmonica, rhythm guitar, melodica, voice
- Sarah Avett – violin on "The Lowering (A Sad Day In Greenvilletown)" and "40 East"

== Charts ==
Chart (2006)	Peak position
US Vinyl Albums (Billboard)	12
