= Better Times (EP) =

EP by Asleep at the Wheel
- Released: May 28, 2021
- Recorded: 2021
- Studio: Bismeaux on the Hill (Austin, Texas); Moonhouse Studio (Austin, Texas)
- Genre: Country; Western swing
- Label: Bismeaux
- Producer: Ray Benson

Asleep at the Wheel chronology
New Routes (2018)	Better Times (2021)

Better Times is an extended play (EP) by American country band Asleep at the Wheel. Recorded at Bismeaux on the Hill and Moonhouse Studios, it was produced by the group's frontman Ray Benson with Sam "Lightnin'" Seifert, and was released on May 28, 2021 by Benson's own label Bismeaux Productions. Better Times is the group's first release to feature steel guitarist Flavio Pasquetto, who replaced Eddie Rivers in 2019.

== Background ==
According to Asleep at the Wheel frontman Ray Benson, the title track of Better Times was written "after nearly a year of this pandemic", referring to the COVID-19 pandemic, which he likens to "a war with an invisible enemy". Benson performs lead vocals on the track; fiddler Katie Shore performs lead vocals on "All I'm Asking"; and the pair duet on "Columbus Stockdale Blues". The band performed "Better Times" at Benson's "birthday bash" during the 2021 South by Southwest festival in Austin, Texas.

== Track listing ==
No.	Title	Writer(s)	Length
1.	"Better Times"	Ray Benson
2.	"All I'm Asking" (originally recorded by the Band of Heathens)	Ed Jurdi; Gordy Quist
3.	"Columbus Stockade Blues" (originally recorded by Darby and Tarlton)	Traditional (arr. Benson)

== Personnel ==
Asleep at the Wheel

- Ray Benson – guitar, vocals, production
- Katie Shore – fiddle, vocals
- Flavio Pasquetto – steel guitar
- Dennis Ludiker – fiddle, mandolin, backing vocals
- Josh Hoag – bass
- John Michael Whitby – piano
- David Sanger – drums

Guest performers

- Ginny Mac – piano, accordion
- Floyd Domino – piano
- Jason Baczynski – drums
- Joey Colarusso – saxophone
- Chloe Feoranzo – clarinet

Additional personnel

- Sam Seifert – production, engineering, mixing, guitar
- Curtis Clogston – engineering
- Chris Gage – additional engineering, piano
- Eric Conn – mastering
- Ellie Newman – art direction
- Brooke Hamilton – photography
