= The Avett Brothers =

American folk-rock band

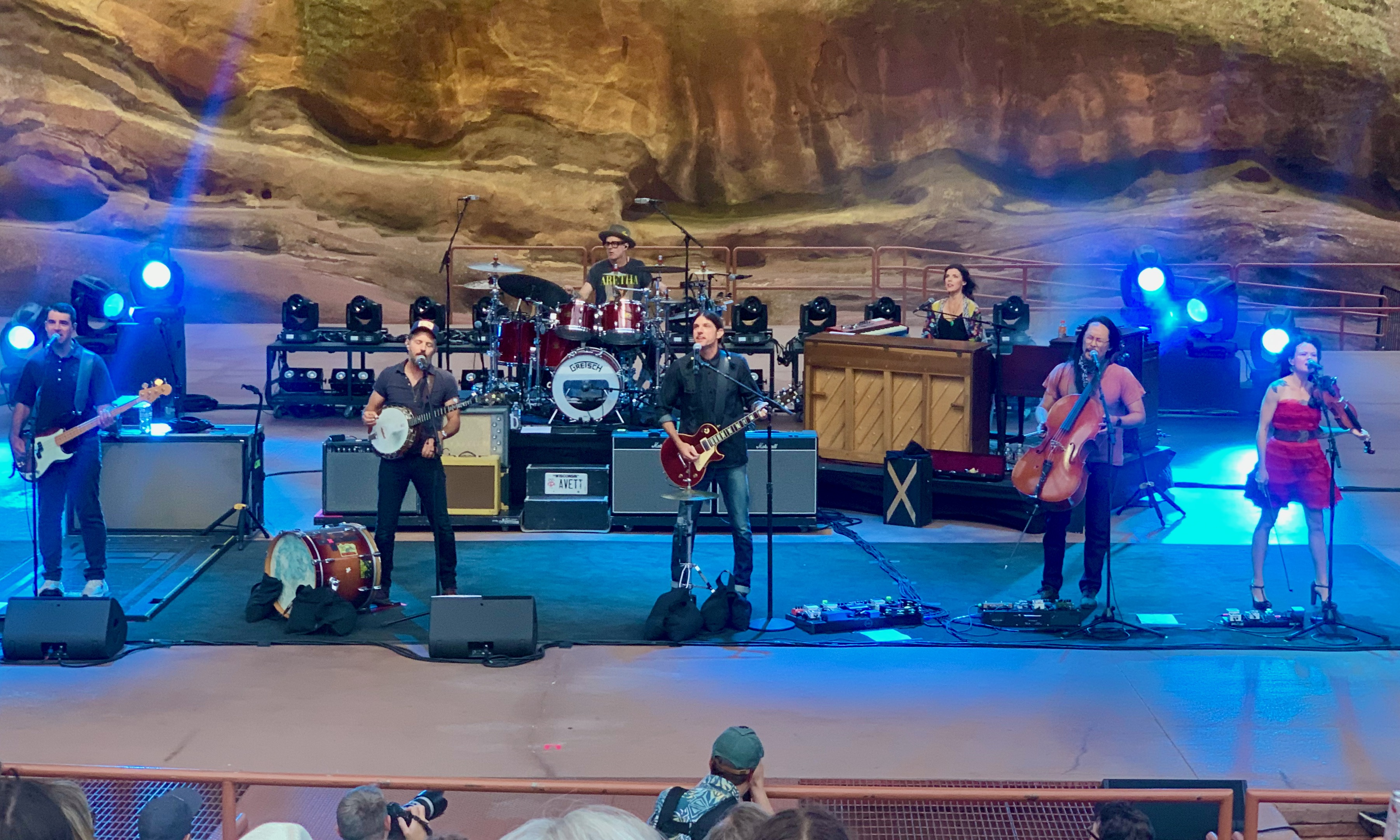
- The Avett Brothers at Red Rocks Amphitheater, 2022. Left to right: Bob Crawford, Scott Avett, Mike Marsh, Seth Avett, Bonnie Avett-Rini, Joe Kwon, Tania Elisabeth

Background information
- Origin: Concord, North Carolina, U.S.
- Genres: Folk; folk rock; alternative country; Americana
- Years active: 2000–present
- Labels: Ramseur, American
- Members: Seth Avett; Scott Avett; Bob Crawford; Joe Kwon
- Past members: John Twomey
- Website: theavettbrothers.com

The Avett Brothers /ˈeɪvɪt/ are an American folk rock band from Concord, North Carolina. The band is made up of two brothers, Scott Avett (banjo, lead vocals, guitar, piano, kick-drum) and Seth Avett (guitar, lead vocals, piano, hi-hat) along with Bob Crawford (double bass, electric bass, violin, backing vocals) and Joe Kwon (cello, backing vocals). Mike Marsh (drums), Tania Elizabeth (fiddle) and Bonnie Avett-Rini (piano) are touring members of the band.

Following on from Seth and Scott's former rock band Nemo, The Avett Brothers combine bluegrass, country, punk, pop melodies, folk, rock and roll, indie rock, honky tonk, and ragtime to produce a novel sound described by the San Francisco Chronicle as having the "heavy sadness of Townes Van Zandt, the light pop concision of Buddy Holly, the tuneful jangle of the Beatles, the raw energy of the Ramones."

== History ==
=== Beginnings (2000–2002) ===
Scott and Seth Avett have played music together since childhood as their grandmother was a concert pianist and their father Jim Avett is a guitarist. Their collaborative partnership began in the late 1990s with the merger of Seth's Mount Pleasant High School rock band Margo and Scott's college group Nemo. Margo had released the song "Dumbfight" on a compilation album before merging with Nemo. After releasing three albums with Nemo, the Avetts started experimenting with acoustic music with some friends at night. After a few street performances and parties they performed under the names The Back Porch Project or Nemo Downstairs. The brothers and Nemo guitarist John Twomey put together an EP entitled The Avett Bros. in 2000 while performing both as the Avett Brothers (with Scott, Seth and John) and as Nemo.

When Nemo broke up Scott and Seth continued to write acoustic music together. In early 2001 the stand-up bassist Bob Crawford, formerly of the Memphis Quick 50, joined the Avetts, and the band released their first full-length album, Country Was. The Avett Brothers set out on a self-booked tour to promote the new album and in late 2002 began preparations for a follow-up.

=== A Carolina Jubilee, Mignonette, and Four Thieves Gone (2003–2006) ===
After releasing a live album of original songs and covers entitled Live at the Double Door Inn the brothers settled down to compile a new full-length album. During this time the band began a partnership with Dolph Ramseur, a local label owner who had been impressed by the group's live show and original material. After 70 hours in the studio, the band recorded the album A Carolina Jubilee, released by Ramseur Records in 2003. Unlike their previous albums, A Carolina Jubilee demonstrated the band's genre-crossing writing and performing.

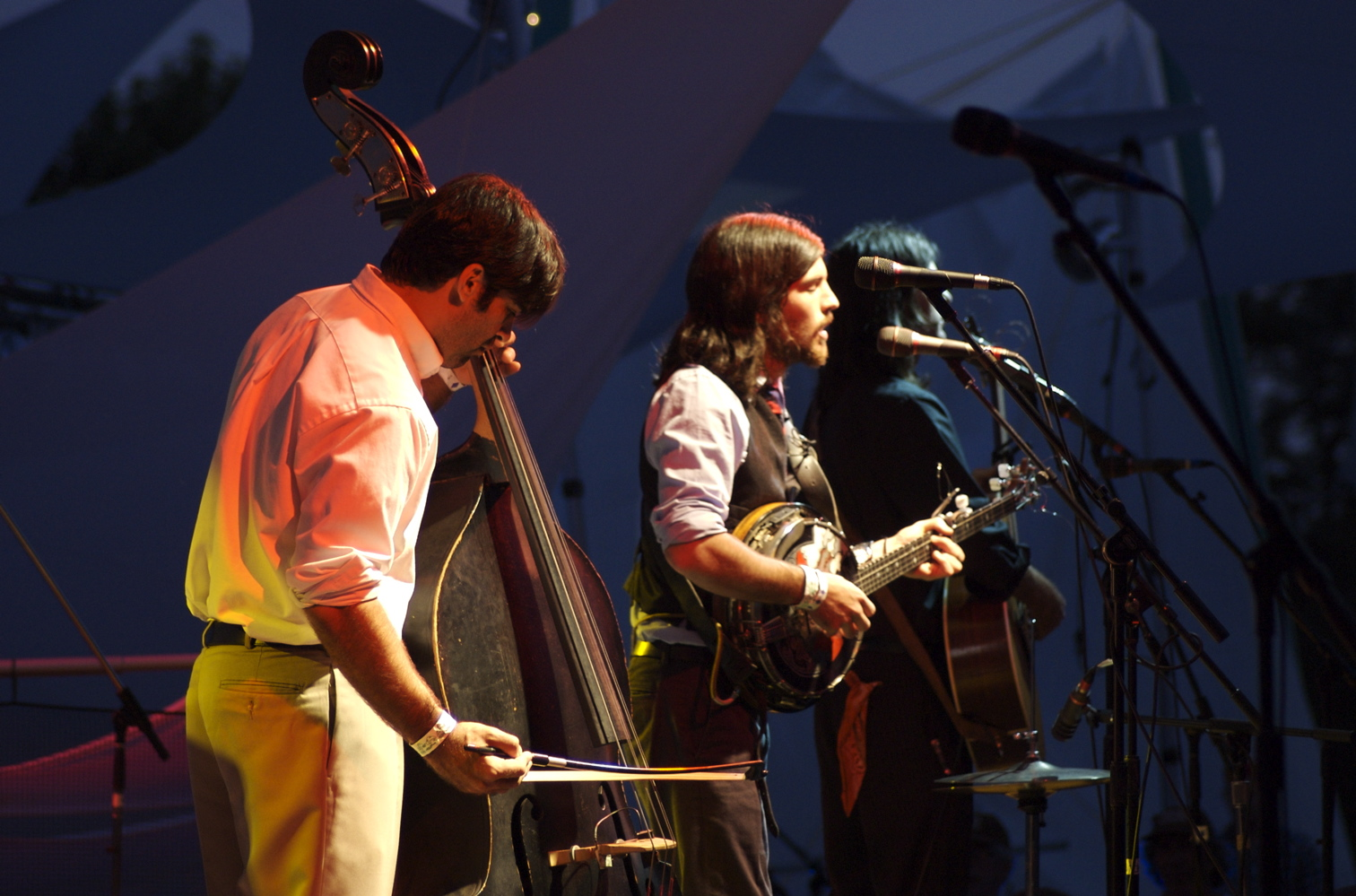
The band at Pickathon, Portland, Oregon, 2006

In 2004, the band released their third album, Mignonette, which featured polished harmonies, introspective lyrics and a sense of dedication that pushed the band to new heights. The album, running longer than 70 minutes, included vocals by the Avetts' sister Bonnie Avett and their father Jim Avett. Mignonette was named after an English yacht which sank off the Cape of Good Hope resulting in the cannibalism case R v Dudley and Stephens.

In 2005, the band released Live, Volume 2, recorded at the Neighborhood Theatre in Charlotte and King's Barcade in Raleigh, North Carolina. The album spanned material from their career up to that point.

In early 2006, the band released Four Thieves Gone: The Robbinsville Sessions to much acclaim. The album was recorded in a lake house in Robbinsville, North Carolina, over the course of 10 days and included collaborations with Paleface and Ian Thomas. The album was titled Four Thieves Gone after Scott Avett realized their song "Denouncing November Blue" sounded identical to the Charlie Daniels song "Uneasy Rider", whom they ultimately credited with the songwriting.

During extensive touring in support of the album Scott and Seth Avett produced The Gleam, an EP of intimate, stripped-down recordings, which was released in September 2006. They were inspired to create the album as a duo after their experience writing and recording "Famous Flower of Manhattan" during the Four Thieves Gone sessions.

=== Emotionalism (2007–2008) ===
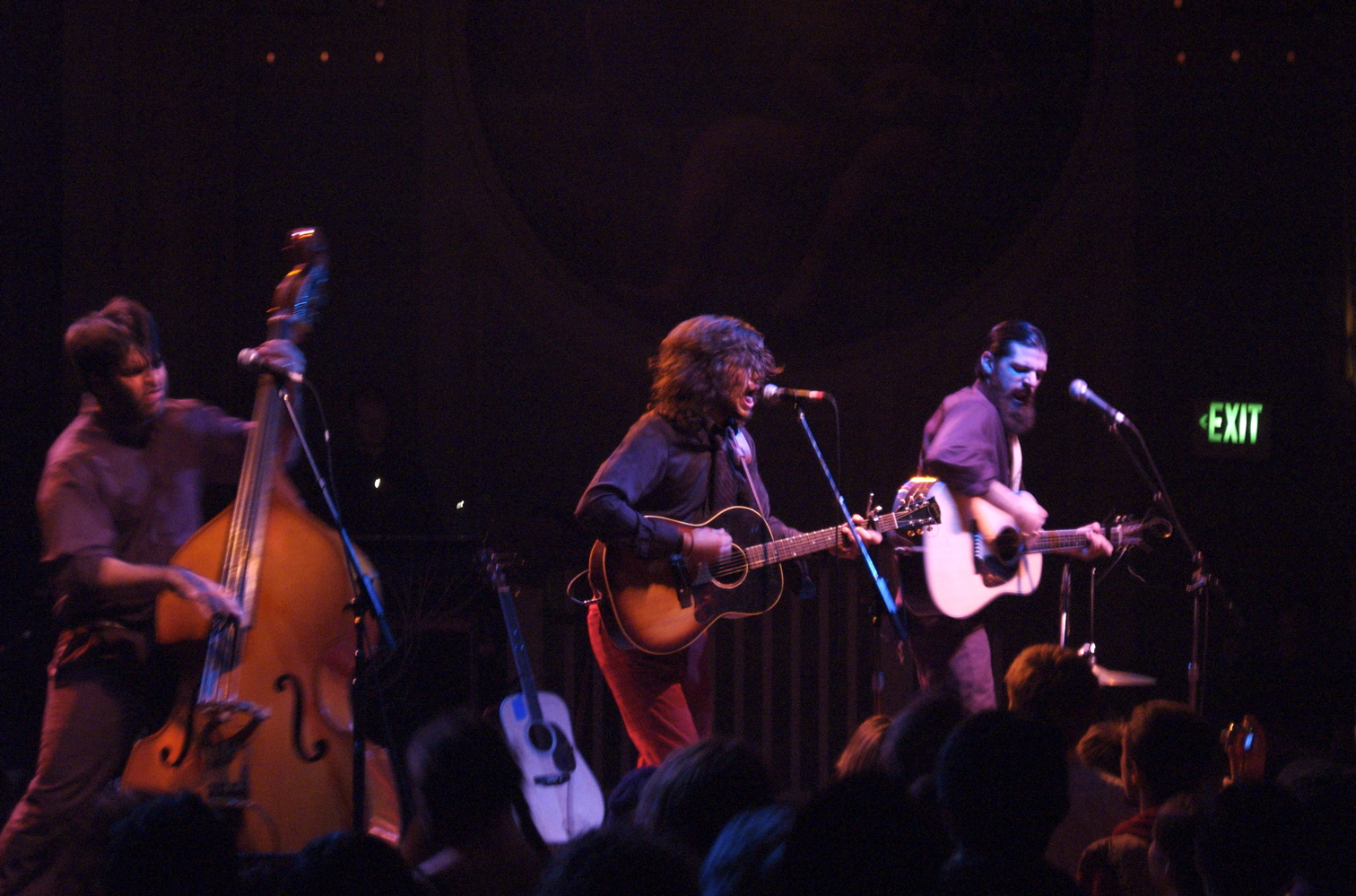
The Avett Brothers at the Crystal Ballroom, Portland, Oregon, January 28, 2007

The band released Emotionalism on May 15, 2007. It debuted at the top of the Billboard Top Heatseekers Albums chart, number 134 on the Billboard 200 and number 13 on the Independent Albums chart. In support of the album the band made their national television debut on May 12 on Late Night with Conan O'Brien performing "Paranoia in B-Flat Major." Emotionalism marked the first appearance of the cellist Joe Kwon who has since become a full-time touring and recording member of the band.

On November 1, 2007, the Americana Music Association presented the Avett Brothers with two awards, as Duo/Group of the Year and as New/Emerging Artist of the Year at the Americana Music Honors & Awards. In July 2008, the band released The Second Gleam, a stripped-down acoustic album like The Gleam. In the same month, the band announced they had chosen Rick Rubin to produce their next album and signed to his American Recordings label.

=== I and Love and You (2009–2011) ===
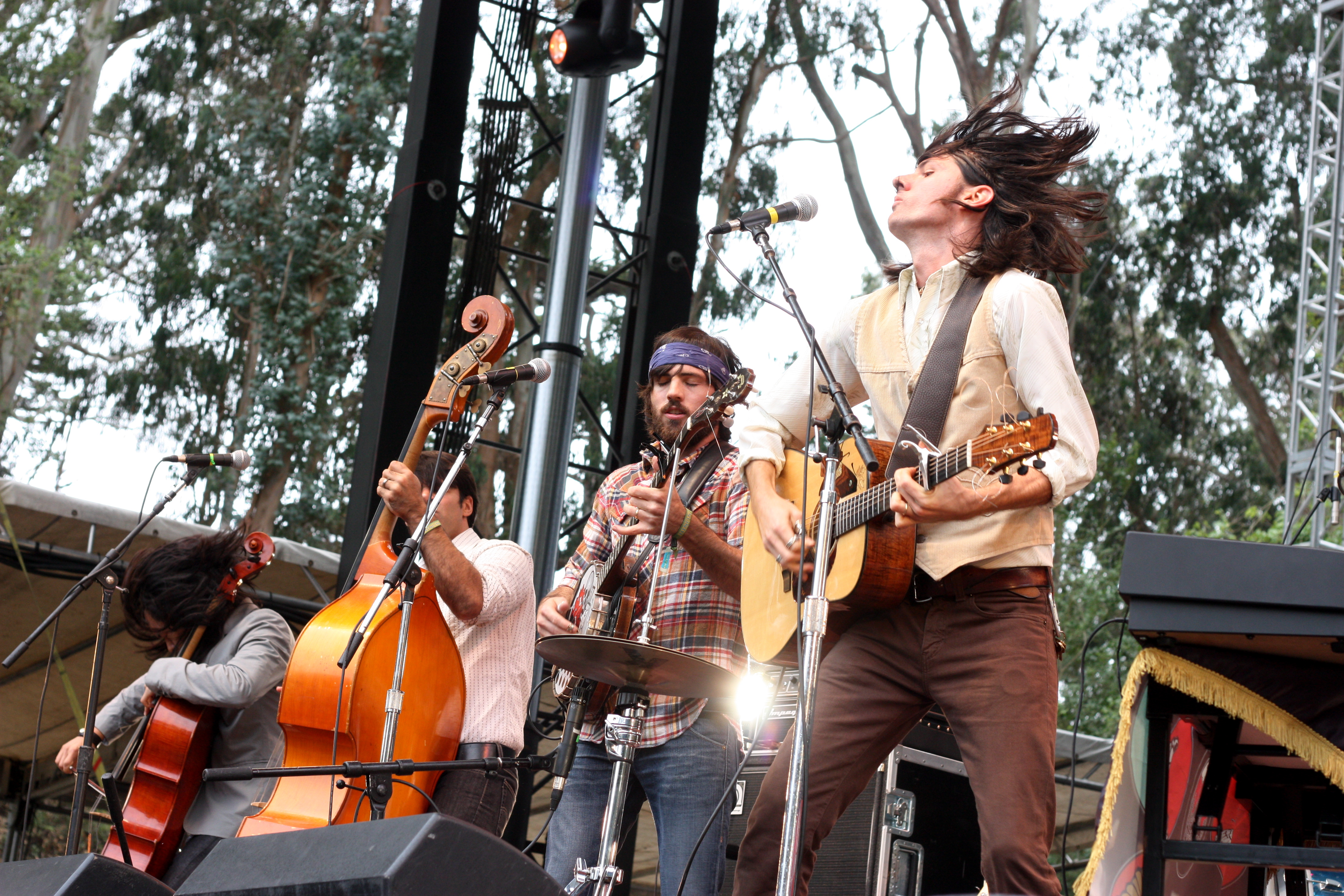
The Avett Brothers performing at the Outside Lands in 2009

From September 8 to October 8, 2009, the Avett Brothers released 13 short videos describing their music and fans in anticipation of their upcoming album, I and Love and You. The videos included clips from past concerts, fan interviews and interviews with the members of the band. I and Love and You, released on September 29, 2009, peaked at number 16 on the Billboard 200 best-selling albums chart, number 8 on the best-selling digital albums chart, number 7 on the rock albums chart, and number 1 on the folk albums chart.

In the wake of the album's release the Avett Brothers appeared on late-night TV programs, including the Late Show with David Letterman, The Late Late Show with Craig Ferguson, and Late Night with Jimmy Fallon. On January 21, 2010, the band was featured on the long-running PBS series Austin City Limits.

In January 2010 drummer Jacob Edwards was added to the Avetts' touring lineup. In the fall of 2010 the band released their third live album and first concert DVD, Live, Volume 3. The performance was recorded the previous year during the band's homecoming concert at Bojangles' Coliseum in Charlotte, North Carolina.

In early 2011, Avett Brothers bassist Bob Crawford learned that his daughter Hallie had a seizure due to a brain tumor. He took a hiatus from the band and was temporarily replaced by Langhorne Slim bassist Paul Defiglia. Crawford returned to play with the band on the 53rd Grammy Awards in 2011, performing "Head Full of Doubt/Road Full of Promise" and then joining Mumford and Sons and Bob Dylan for a performance of "Maggie's Farm." After successful treatment at St. Jude Children's Research Hospital his daughter's condition stabilized, and he returned to the band. The band kept Defiglia as a touring member, playing organ, double bass, and keyboard.

=== The Carpenter and Magpie and the Dandelion (2012–2015) ===
In 2011, the band began the demo process for the followup to I and Love and You for a 2012 release, also produced by Rick Rubin. 24 songs were recorded. On June 26, 2012, the Avett Brothers released a preview of the single "Live and Die" on NPR Music and announced that their sixth studio album, The Carpenter, would be released on September 11, 2012. It debuted at number 4 on the Billboard 200 and was nominated for the Grammy for Best Americana Album at 55th Annual Grammy Awards. Jacob Edwards left the band in December 2012. Mike Marsh, formerly the drummer of Dashboard Confessional, which recorded songs from I and Love and You, joined the band as a touring member at their annual New Year's Eve show in 2012.

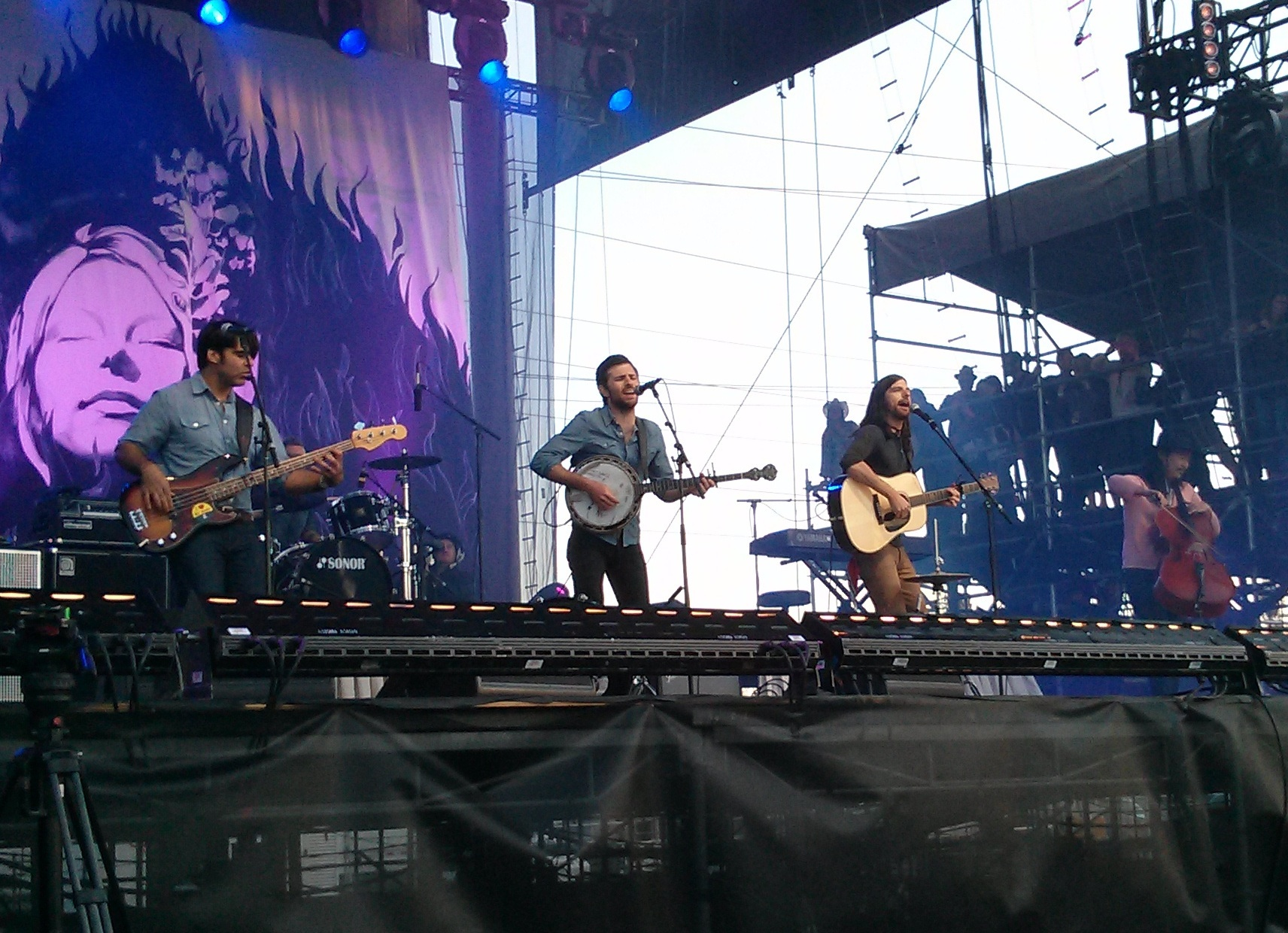
The Avett Brothers at the Bottlerock music festival, Napa, California, May 2013

On June 12, 2013, the Avett Brothers announced that a follow-up companion to The Carpenter would be released in the fall of 2013. On July 27, at the Newport Folk Festival, the band announced that the new album would be entitled Magpie and the Dandelion. On August 8, they told NPR that Magpie and the Dandelion, which consisted mostly of songs recorded during sessions for The Carpenter, would be released on October 15, 2013. The NPR announcement also premiered their new single "Another Is Waiting." The album was released to generally warm reviews and peaked at number 5 on the Billboard 200 during its first week. Tania Elizabeth, who had recorded with the Avetts during the Magpie and the Dandelion sessions, began touring with the band on November 21, 2013.

Near the end of May 2014, Seth Avett and Bob Crawford mentioned in different interviews they were recording demos for their next album, to be produced by Rick Rubin. During their concert on December 13, 2014, in Myrtle Beach, South Carolina, Seth and Scott mentioned they spent November recording songs for their upcoming album. In November 2015 Seth updated the release estimate to be "early 2016."

On November 23, 2015, the band announced their fourth live album and second concert DVD, titled Live, Vol. Four would be released on December 18, 2015. The live album was recorded at their concert in Raleigh, North Carolina, on December 31, 2014. While touring in support of Live, Vol. Four the band spoke of their ninth studio album.

=== True Sadness and Closer Than Together (2016–2019) ===
On March 3, 2016, the band announced the expected release of their ninth full-length studio album, True Sadness, which Seth Avett described as "a patchwork quilt, both thematically and stylistically." The album was released on June 24, 2016, and debuted at number 3 on the Billboard Top 200, topping the U.S. Folk and U.S. Top Rock charts, though reviews were mixed. Entertainment Weekly praised the band's experimentation and "willingness to tear down boundaries" while Pitchfork criticized the "baffling layers of synthesizers in what feels like a ploy to push the Avetts into clear Top 40 territory." The album was nominated for two awards, Best Americana Album and Best American Roots Performance (for the album's lead single, "Ain't No Man"), at the 59th Annual Grammy Awards. On January 31, 2017, it was announced that a documentary about the production of True Sadness, entitled May It Last: A Portrait of the Avett Brothers, directed by Judd Apatow and Michael Bonfiglio, would premiere at the 2017 South by Southwest film festival. The documentary was released on HBO on January 29, 2018.

Also during this period, in October 2016, the band was inducted into the North Carolina Music Hall of Fame. While the core four members of the band remained the same, the remaining line-up of the band continued to evolve. On August 18, 2017, the band announced that keyboardist Paul Defiglia would be leaving the band on September 3, 2017. Scott and Seth's older sister Bonnie Avett Rini immediately joined them on tour playing piano. And on August 27, 2018, Tania Elizabeth announced on Instagram that she was taking maternity leave from the band but returned for the majority of their 2019 tour.

On December 21, 2017, Scott Avett mentioned in an interview that they were again working with producer Rick Rubin on new material. Ten months later, in October 2018, the band debuted the song "Roses & Sacrifice" on Late Night with Seth Meyers, and in an interview Scott Avett stated their next album would release the following year, in 2019, describing the album as “by no means a political record, but it’s more about blatant social and political issues than ever before." The next month, on November 16, 2018, "Roses & Sacrifice" was released as a single on the American Recordings label, with follow-up singles "Trouble Letting Go" and "Neapolitan Sky" released on December 21, 2018, and February 1, 2019, respectively. On May 6 the band released "Sun, Flood, or Drought," a song featured in the documentary The Biggest Little Farm. On June 13 the band announced that their next album would be titled Closer Than Together, to be released on October 4, 2019, and described as "informed by what is happening now." The album reached No. 2 on the Billboard Americana/Folk charts to mixed reviews.

=== The Third Gleam, The Avett Brothers, and AVTT/PTTN (2020–present) ===
In a late February 2020 interview, Scott Avett stated "we plan to at least have another release this year if all goes well." On June 29, 2020, the band announced the third installment of their Gleam series, The Third Gleam (stylized The Gleam III) would release on August 28, 2020. It released to generally favorable reviews and was supported by two drive-in concerts at the Charlotte Motor Speedway to allow social distancing for the COVID-19 pandemic. The Avett Brothers released a cover of Woody Guthrie's "This Land Is Your Land" on Friday, October 30, four days before the 2020 United States presidential election.

In August 2019 the band announced that a stage musical based on their music, titled Swept Away, would debut at the Berkeley Repertory Theatre in June 2020. It was postponed to 2022 due to the pandemic, opening on January 9.

On February 28, the band announced their twelfth studio album would be a self-titled album, releasing on the Ramseur Records label on May 17, 2024. The band announced a Fall 2024 US tour in support of the album and revealed that the Swept Away stage play based on their music would be debuting on Broadway in the autumn of 2024. The Swept Away musical was scheduled to close in December 2024 after a short run on Broadway.

On September 16, 2025, after teasers on the respective artist's social media, The Avett Brothers and Mike Patton announced their collaborative project 'AVTT/PTTN', which would release on November 14, 2025 via Thirty Tigers in association with Ramseur Records and Ipecac Recordings. Subsequently they would announce tour dates for 2026 and would appear on The Tonight Show Starring Jimmy Fallon and CBS Mornings to promote the collaboration.

== Members ==
Recording members

- Seth Avett – lead and backing vocals, guitar, hi-hat, piano, drums, kazoo, percussion (2000–present)
- Scott Avett – lead and backing vocals, banjo, kick drum, harmonica, guitar, piano, drums, kazoo, percussion (2000–present)
- Bob Crawford – backing and lead vocals, double bass, bass guitar, trumpet, violin, mariachi bass, kazoo (2001–present)
- Joe Kwon – cello, musical saw, backing vocals, cowbell, kazoo, piano (2006–present)

Touring musicians

- Mike Marsh – drums (2012–present)
- Bonnie Avett-Rini – piano (2017–present)
- Tania Elizabeth – violin, vocals, kazoo (2013–2018, 2019–present)

Previous members

- John Twomey – guitar (2000–2001)

Previous touring members

- Jacob Edwards – drums (2010–2012)
- Paul Defiglia – piano, double bass, organ, vocals (2011–2017)

Timeline

* Jacob Edwards appears on the October 2013 album Magpie and the Dandelion despite having stopped touring with the band in December 2012.

== Discography ==
Studio albums

- Country Was (2002)
- A Carolina Jubilee (2003)
- Mignonette (2004)
- Four Thieves Gone: The Robbinsville Sessions (2006)
- Emotionalism (2007)
- I and Love and You (2009)
- The Carpenter (2012)
- Magpie and the Dandelion (2013)
- True Sadness (2016)
- Closer Than Together (2019)
- The Avett Brothers (2024)

== Awards and nominations ==
Americana Music Honors & Awards

Year	Nominee / work	Award	Result
2007	The Avett Brothers	Emerging Artist of the Year	Won
2007	Emotionalism	Album of the Year	Nominated
2007	The Avett Brothers	Duo/Group of the Year	Won
2008	The Avett Brothers	Duo/Group of the Year	Nominated
2010	The Avett Brothers	Duo/Group of the Year	Won
2010	"I and Love and You"	Song of the Year	Nominated
2011	The Avett Brothers	Duo/Group of the Year	Won
2014	The Avett Brothers	Duo/Group of the Year	Nominated
2023	The Avett Brothers	Lifetime Achievement Award for Performance	Won

Grammy Awards

Year	Nominee / work	Award	Result
2013	The Carpenter	Best Americana Album	Nominated
2017	"Ain't No Man"	Best American Roots Performance	Nominated
2017	True Sadness	Best Americana Album	Nominated
2025	The Avett Brothers	Best Recording Package	Nominated

== Other appearances ==
- "Live and Die", from The Carpenter, was used in the 2012 Judd Apatow comedy This Is 40 and was included on its soundtrack.
- "If It's the Beaches", from The Gleam, was used in season two of the television series Friday Night Lights and was included on the soundtrack album Friday Night Lights Vol. 2.
- "I and Love and You" was used in the episode of the same title, in season seven, of the television series One Tree Hill.
- "Kick Drum Heart", from I and Love and You, was used in the episode "Live for Today, Pray for Tomorrow", the first episode of the second season of MTV's World of Jenks.
- The NBC drama Parenthood has used several songs by the Avett Brothers:
  - "Kick Drum Heart", from I and Love and You, was used in the opening scene of the pilot and was later included on the show's soundtrack.
  - "Slight Figure of Speech", from I and Love and You, was played in the background in the episode "Qualities and Figures", in season two.
  - "Part from Me", from Magpie and the Dandelion, was used in the episode "Limbo", in season five.
  - "Open Ended Life", from Magpie and the Dandelion, was used in the episode "Fraud Alert", in season five.
  - "The Once and Future Carpenter", from The Carpenter, was used in the episode "The Scale of Affection Is Fluid", in season six.
- "Will You Return", from Emotionalism, was the theme song of the Peabody Award–winning public television series A Chef's Life.
- "Head Full of Doubt/Road Full of Promise", from I and Love and You, was used in the episode "Halt & Catch Fire", the thirteenth episode of the tenth season of The CW's Supernatural.
- The Netflix series Love has used several songs by the Avett Brothers:
  - "No Hard Feelings", from True Sadness, was used in the episode "Friends Night Out", in season two.
  - "Kick Drum Heart", from I And Love And You, was used in the episode "The Cruikshanks", in season three.
- On November 1, 2012, the band appeared on Jimmy Kimmel Live and performed "I and Love and You" with the Brooklyn Philharmonic.
- On February 22, 2013, the band appeared on Late Night with Jimmy Fallon to perform a medley of "Kick Drum Heart" and "Geraldine".
- On September 30, 2013, the band performed "Vanity" on Late Night with Jimmy Fallon with Chris Cornell.
- On December 31, 2013, the band performed their songs "All My Mistakes", from Emotionalism, and "Head Full of Doubt" and "Road Full of Promise", from I and Love and You, and a cover version of Tom T. Hall's "How I Got to Memphis" on Showtime's Another Day, Another Time: Celebrating the Music of Inside Llewyn Davis.
- On January 20, 2017, the band performed "Give Me Love (Give Me Peace on Earth)" on The Late Show with Stephen Colbert.
- On June 6, 2017, the band appeared in the documentary The American Epic Sessions directed by Bernard MacMahon. The band recorded live on the restored first electrical sound recording system from the 1920s.
- On January 24, 2018, the band performed "No Hard Feelings" on The Tonight Show Starring Jimmy Fallon.
- On January 26, 2018, the band performed "I Wish I Was" on Megyn Kelly Today.
- On January 29, 2018, the Judd Apatow directed documentary May It Last: A Portrait of the Avett Brothers premiered on HBO.
- On July 18, 2018, Scott and Seth Avett appeared on comedian Pete Holmes' podcast You Made It Weird with Pete Holmes.
- On October 24, 2018, the band made their 25th late night television appearance performing their unreleased song "Roses and Sacrifice" on Late Night with Seth Meyers.
- On October 7, 2019, the band performed "Tell the Truth" on The Tonight Show Starring Jimmy Fallon.
- Their song "Murder in the City" was used in the Netflix series Outer Banks which premiered on February 23, 2023.
- Their cover of "This Land is Your Land" was used in the 2025 second season of the Apple TV series Platonic.

== In popular culture ==
References to and lyrics by The Avett Brothers feature prominently in Slammed, a New York Times best-selling romance novel by Colleen Hoover.

Swept Away, consisting of songs from various Avett Brothers albums, premiered at the Berkeley Repertory Theatre in 2022, and went on to have a Broadway run in 2024.
