= Closer Than Together =

Studio album by the Avett Brothers
- Released: October 4, 2019
- Recorded: 2019
- Length: 55:24
- Labels: American, Republic
- Producer: Rick Rubin

The Avett Brothers chronology
True Sadness (2016)	Closer Than Together (2019)	The Third Gleam (2020)

Closer Than Together is the tenth studio album by American folk rock band the Avett Brothers. The album was released on October 4, 2019, by American Recordings and Republic Records.

== Critical reception ==
Professional ratings
Aggregate scores
Source	Rating
Metacritic	52/100
Review scores
Source	Rating
AllMusic	2.5/5 stars
Exclaim!	4/10
Paste	5.2/10

Closer Than Together received generally mixed reviews from critics. At Metacritic, which assigns a normalized rating out of 100 to reviews from critics, the album received an average score of 52, which indicates "mixed or average reviews", based on 4 reviews.

== Track listing ==
No.	Title	Length
1.	"Bleeding White"	3:36
2.	"Tell the Truth"	3:22
3.	"We Americans"	6:23
4.	"Long Story Short"	4:05
5.	"C Sections and Railway Trestles"	4:33
6.	"High Steppin'"	3:21
7.	"When You Learn"	4:06
8.	"Bang Bang"	4:12
9.	"Better Here"	3:50
10.	"New Woman's World"	4:04
11.	"Who Will I Hold"	4:22
12.	"Locked Up"	3:18
13.	"It's Raining Today"	6:10
Total length:		55:24

== Charts ==
Chart (2019)	Peak position
UK Americana Albums (Official Charts)	30
US Billboard 200	28
US Americana/Folk Albums (Billboard)	2
US Top Rock Albums (Billboard)	4
