= The Second Gleam =

EP by The Avett Brothers
- Released: July 22, 2008
- Recorded: Electromagnetic Radiation Recorders and Echo Mountain
- Genres: Folk, indie folk
- Label: Ramseur
- Producers: The Avett Brothers and Doug Williams

The Avett Brothers chronology
Emotionalism (2007)	The Second Gleam (2008)	I and Love and You (2009)

The Second Gleam (sometimes written The Gleam II) is a 2008 EP by The Avett Brothers. It was produced by The Avett Brothers and Doug Williams, and recorded by Doug Williams at Electromagnetic Radiation Recorders, with the exception of "The Greatest Sum (Electric)" which was recorded at Echo Mountain. This acoustic EP was a follow-up to The Gleam, which was released in 2006.

Professional ratings
Review scores
Source	Rating
Allmusic	3/5 stars
Billboard	
Pitchfork Media	(7.2/10)
HonestTune.com	

== Track listing ==
1. "Tear Down the House" – 3:04
2. "Murder in the City" – 3:12
3. "Bella Donna" – 3:03
4. "The Greatest Sum" – 3:20
5. "Black, Blue" – 4:27 (only by download, vinyl, or streaming)
6. "St. Joseph's" – 3:23
7. "Souls Like the Wheels" – 4:38
8. "The Greatest Sum (Electric)" – 3:13 (only by download, vinyl, or streaming)

== Charts ==
Chart (2008)	Position
US Billboard 200	82
US Billboard Digital Albums (Billboard)	19
US Billboard Independent Albums (Billboard)	10
US Billboard Tastemaker Albums (Billboard)	10
