= Scott Avett =

American musician

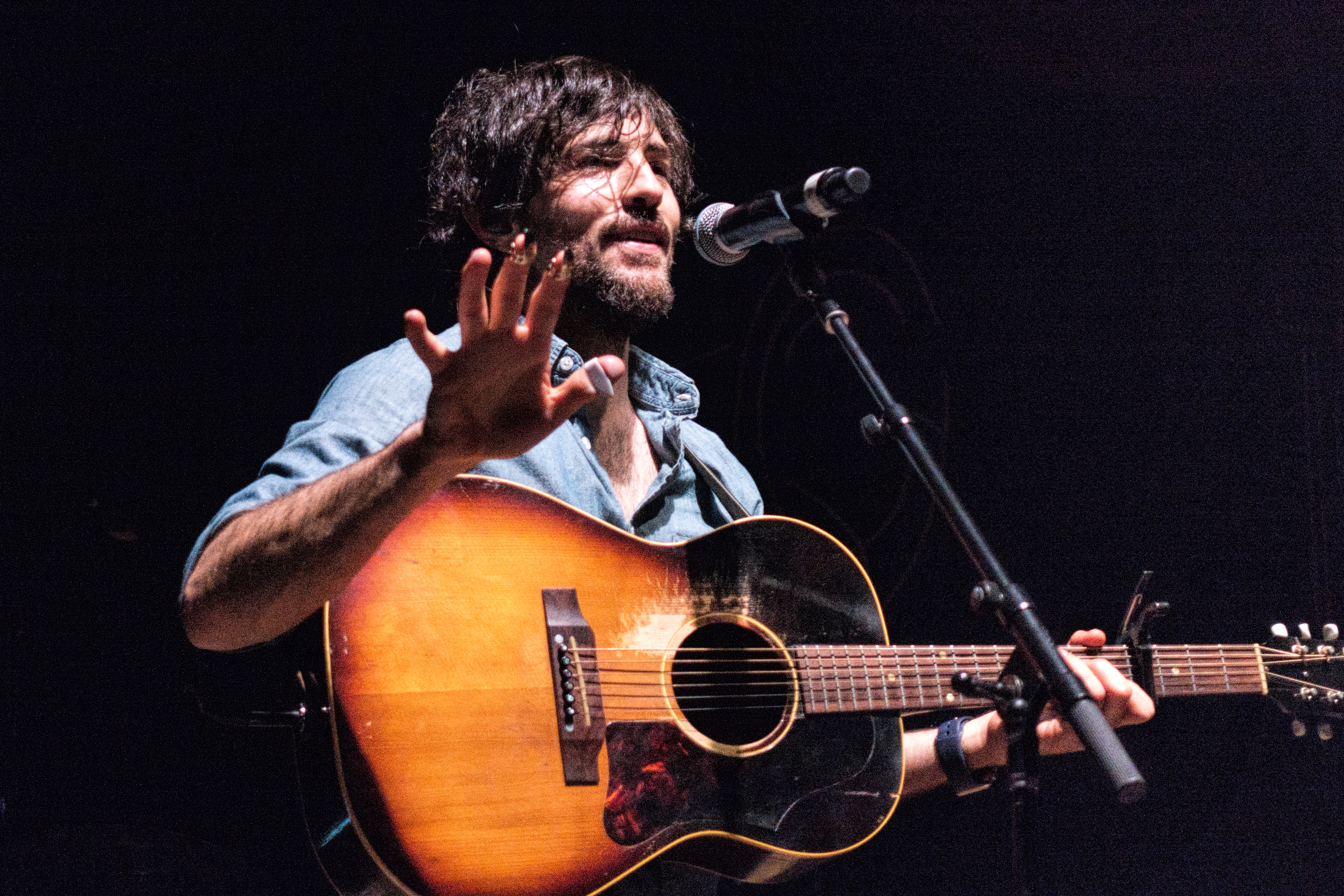
- Performing with The Avett Brothers in November 2017

Background information
- Born: Scott Yancey Avett; June 19, 1976 (age 50); Cheyenne, Wyoming, United States
- Origin: Concord, North Carolina
- Education: East Carolina University (BFA)
- Genres: Folk; indie rock; folk rock
- Occupations: Singer; musician
- Instruments: Vocals; banjo; harmonica; drums; piano; guitar; kazoo
- Member of: The Avett Brothers
- Website: www.ScottAvett.com

Scott Yancey Avett (born June 19, 1976) is one of the lead singers and founding members of the folk-rock band The Avett Brothers. Avett primarily plays the banjo but also plays harmonica, drums, piano, acoustic guitar and electric guitar for the band based out of Concord, North Carolina. In 2008, their album, The Second Gleam, reached the ten spot on Billboard.com's Top Independent Albums Chart. Avett is also an accomplished artist and printmaker. His work has been displayed in exhibitions at the Envoy Gallery in New York City and the North Carolina Museum of Art.

== Background and education ==
Scott Avett was born in 1976 in Cheyenne, Wyoming to Jim Avett and Susan (Gleason) Avett of Concord, North Carolina. Scott's paternal grandparents were Reverend Clegg Avett, a Methodist minister, and Martha (Hogan) Avett, a former concert pianist. Scott is the middle of three children. His sister, Bonnie, the oldest, was born in 1973. His brother Seth, the youngest, was born in 1980. His father owned a welding business in Concord, and his mother taught elementary school. Jim Avett is now a recording artist with Ramseur Records and often sings gospel songs with his daughter Bonnie and with his sons at The Avett Brothers shows. Scott Avett enrolled at East Carolina University, and he earned a bachelor's degree in communications in 1999 as well as a bachelor of fine arts degree in painting the following year.

== The Avett Brothers ==
Scott and his brother Seth Avett were involved with their respective bands during their college years. Scott played with Nemo in Greenville. and Seth played with the Charlotte-based band Margo (Scott has been quoted classifying Margo's music as "melodic rock"). The brothers, along with guitarist/founding member John Twomey, merged the bands while maintaining the name Nemo in 1998. The Avett Brothers were formed during the Nemo days with fellow Nemo guitarist/founding member John Twomey. During this time, the name was changed to The Avett Brothers, and Nemo and The Avett Brothers continued touring as separate bands. Bob Crawford later joined that band in 2001 when Twomey quit both bands and Nemo dissolved. Scott has a more baritone voice, compared to his brother. In 2003, The Avett Brothers were introduced to Dolph Ramseur, the owner of Ramseur Records, an independent record label in Concord, North Carolina.

== Artwork ==
Scott began to paint seriously in 1999 under the direction of professor and mentor Leland Wallin. In 2002, Scott opened an art gallery in Concord, North Carolina. In addition to oil-on-canvas portraits, Scott is an accomplished printmaker. Scott specializes in creating relief prints. Scott's artwork was featured at the Envoy Gallery in New York City from July through August in 2008. Scott's work also was featured in an exhibit titled Scott Avett: INVISIBLE at the North Carolina Museum of Art in Raleigh North Carolina from October 26, 2019, to January 19, 2020.

Avett painted the cover artwork for By the Way, I Forgive You, the 2018 album of long-time friend Brandi Carlile.

== Personal life ==
In 2003, Scott Avett married his wife, Sarah, who gave birth to a baby girl, Eleanor, in late October 2008. In April 2011, it was announced that two shows in Texas would be postponed due to the birth of his second child, a son named Maxwell. Avett revealed the sex of his baby in London when he re-wrote the lyrics to his song "Murder in the City" which originally was released in 2007. The original lyrics were "make sure my sister knows I loved her, make sure my mother knows the same" and they were changed to "make sure my daughter knows I loved her, make sure her mother knows the same.". A second son, Luke, was born in March 2015. In July 2016 at a show near Seattle, Scott sang "make sure my boys know I love them, make sure my girl knows the same, always remember there is nothing worth sharing like the love that let us share our name."

Scott Avett is the grandson of Reverend Clegg W. Avett (1914–1976), a Methodist minister whose sermons influenced Scott's faith.
