= Seth Avett =

American musician (born 1980)

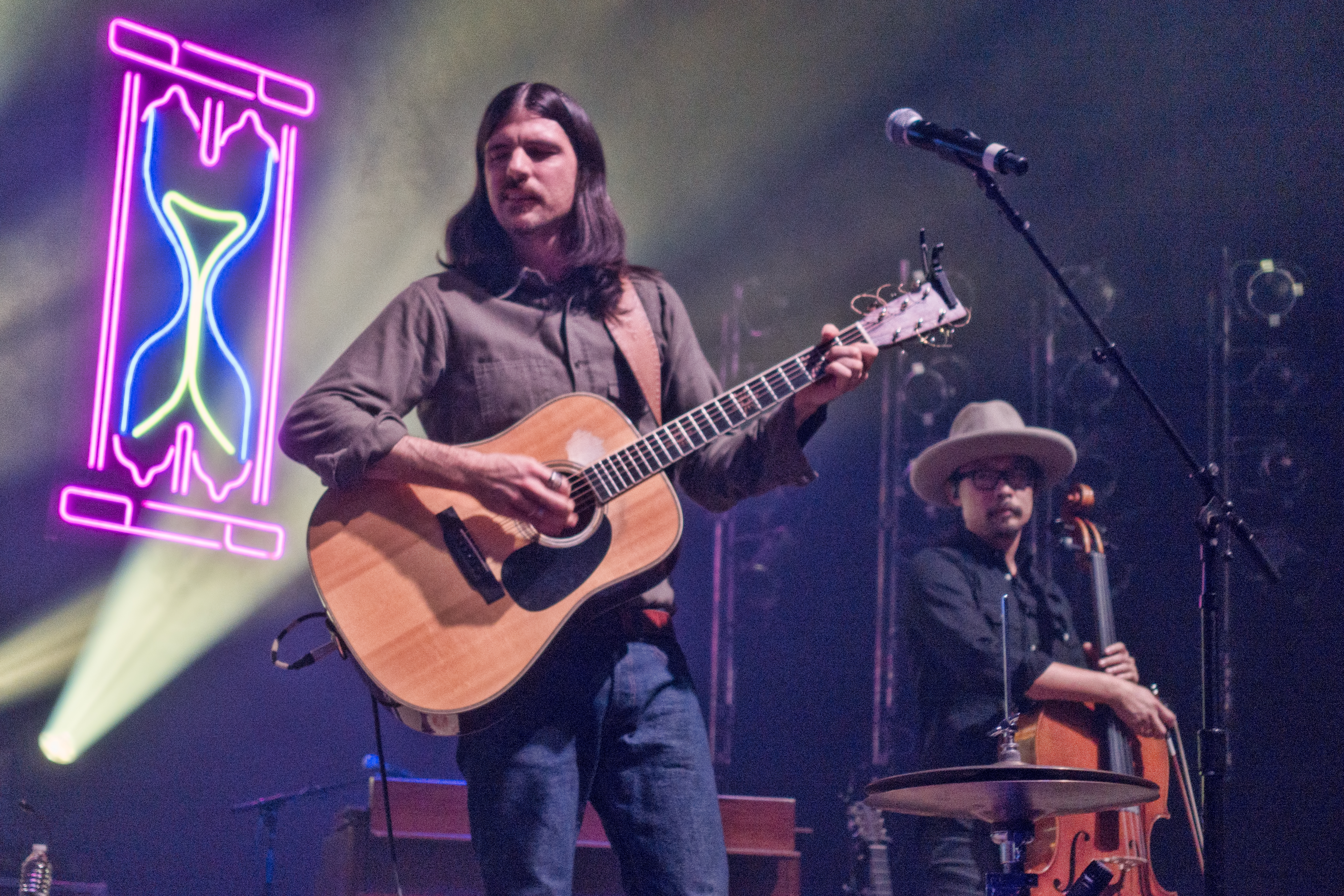
- Performing with The Avett Brothers in November 2017

Background information
- Born: Timothy Seth Avett; July 30, 1980 (age 46); Charlotte, North Carolina
- Origin: Concord, North Carolina, United States
- Education: University of North Carolina at Charlotte (BFA)
- Genres: Folk; indie rock; folk rock; rap
- Occupations: Singer; musician
- Instruments: Vocals; guitar; drums; percussion; piano; kazoo
- Spouse: Jennifer Carpenter (m. 2016)

Timothy Seth Avett (born July 30, 1980) is an American musician and one of the lead singers and founding members of the American folk-rock band The Avett Brothers. Avett sings and plays guitar, drums, bass, and piano for the band based out of Concord, North Carolina. In 2008, their album, The Second Gleam, reached the number ten spot on Billboard.com's Top Independent Albums chart, and stayed there for three weeks.

== Background ==
Seth Avett is the son of Susie and Jim Avett of Concord, North Carolina. He is the youngest of three children. Bonnie, his older sister, was born in 1973, and Scott, his older brother, was born in 1976. Seth was born in Charlotte on July 30, 1980. His father owned a welding business in Concord, and his mother was a school teacher.

== The Avett Brothers ==
Seth and Scott were heavily involved with their respective bands during their college years. During this time, Scott was playing with Nemo in Greenville, and Seth was involved with the Charlotte-based band Margo. Seth Avett was lead singer and played lead guitar, Noah Warner was drummer/guitarist/singer/writer, Kenny Graham was back-up guitarist, and Ben Sawyer was bass guitarist. Margo had the song "Dumbfight" published on a compilation album with the California production company Rodelle Records. (Scott has been quoted classifying Margo's music as "melodic rock".)

The Brothers, along with guitarist/founding member John Twomey, decided to merge the bands while maintaining the name "Nemo" in 1998. The Avett Brothers were formed during the Nemo days with fellow Nemo guitarist/founding member John Twomey. During this time, the name was changed to The Avett Brothers while Nemo and The Avett Brothers continued touring as separate bands. Bob Crawford later joined that band in 2001 when Twomey quit both bands. Eventually, Nemo disbanded, and with the addition of acoustic instruments and bassist Bob Crawford of Charlotte, The Avett Brothers were formed.

In 2003, The Avett Brothers were introduced to Dolph Ramseur, the owner of Ramseur Records, an independent record label in Concord. Since the year 2000, The Avett Brothers have released 11 albums (seven with Ramseur). In late 2007, The Avett Brothers added cellist Joe Kwon, a graduate of the University of North Carolina and then-member of Big Pretty and the Red Rockets to their roster. They made a 2007 appearance on Late Night with Conan O'Brien, signed in 2008 to the Columbia record label, and had the number one album (Emotionalism) on Billboard's Heatseekers chart. The Avett Brothers have toured with Portland band Sallie Ford and the Sound Outside. The year brings their first release with Columbia on September 29 and performances as the opening act for both the Dave Matthews Band and Widespread Panic.

== Solo career ==
Seth Avett has released four albums under the moniker of Timothy Seth Avett as Darling. The first, titled To Make the World Quiet, was recorded in the winter of 2001 and self-released shortly thereafter. In 2002, he self-released another album, titled Killing the Headlamps.

His third solo release, The Mourning, the Silver, The Bell, is his most successful to date. Released by Ramseur Records in 2006, the record is now out of print, along with its two companions. The last copies of The Mourning, The Silver, The Bell available were sold in December 2008 during a three-night residency at The Orange Peel in Asheville, North Carolina.

On December 30, 2009, the first three albums as Timothy Seth Avett as Darling were re-released through Ramseur Records. The first two albums were re-mixed by Doug Williams at Electromagnetic Radiation studios and mastered for the first time by Brent Lambert at The Kitchen Mastering.

On March 17, 2015, Seth teamed up with Jessica Lea Mayfield to record a set of Elliott Smith's songs. The two released an album titled Seth Avett & Jessica Lea Mayfield Sing Elliott Smith.

On March 31, 2017, Seth released his fourth solo album asTimothy Seth Avett as Darling. The album is titled IV.

On September 23, 2022, Seth announced a 10-track Greg Brown tribute album titled Seth Avett Sings Greg Brown, set for release on November 4, 2022. As part of the announcement, he released the album's first single, "Good Morning Coffee". The second and final single from the album, titled "Laughing River", was released on October 15, 2022.

On September 5, 2025, Seth released a fifth solo album, titled "Feathe". It was a vast departure from Avett's previous works, implementing hip hop and rap harmonies. The album featured a collaboration with Jessica Lea Mayfield, titled "The Question of Evil," and was accompanied by weekly releases of music videos, created by Seth himself, for each individual song.

== Personal life ==
Avett married his first wife, Susan Kay Adkins, in 2008; the two divorced around 2013.

In 2015, Avett and actress Jennifer Carpenter became engaged while expecting their first child, a son born later that year. Carpenter and Avett married in May 2016.
