= Asleep at the Wheel Remembers the Alamo =

Studio album by Asleep at the Wheel
- Released: November 4, 2003
- Studio: Bismeaux Studio (Austin, Texas)
- Genre: Country; Western swing
- Length: 43:03
- Label: Shout! Factory
- Producer: Ray Benson

Asleep at the Wheel chronology
Live at Billy Bob's Texas (2003)	Asleep at the Wheel Remembers the Alamo (2003)	Live at Ebbets Field 1973 (2004)

Asleep at the Wheel Remembers the Alamo is the 18th studio album by American country band Asleep at the Wheel. Recorded at Bismeaux Studio in Austin, Texas, it was produced by the band's frontman Ray Benson and released on November 4, 2003 by Shout! Factory. The record is a loose concept album based on the Battle of the Alamo in San Antonio, Texas in 1836, including several songs written by Paul Francis Webster and Dimitri Tiomkin for the 1960 film The Alamo.

Benson was inspired to record an album based on the Battle of Alamo after learning that there was to be no soundtrack produced for the upcoming film The Alamo (2004). The band recorded several songs based on the event, and inspired by the state of Texas generally, including one original composition based on Ozzy Osbourne's infamous visit to the Alamo cenotaph in 1982. Remembers the Alamo was the band's last album to feature guitarist Jim Murphy and fiddler Haydn Vitera.

== Background ==
Asked by Lone Star magazine about the link between Asleep at the Wheel Remembers the Alamo and the 2004 film The Alamo, Asleep at the Wheel frontman Ray Benson explained that "the movie was the whole idea. A friend of mine from L.A. [actor Billy Bob Thornton, who stars in the film] said "They're not doing a soundtrack record" ... you'd think with an Alamo movie, some prominent Texas artists might be used, but they didn't ever call anybody up. So we thought, well, if they're not going to do it, we will! Because there's such great music involved. And I knew all the songs." All the songs recorded for the album were linked with the Battle of the Alamo or Texas in some way, including songs from the original 1960 film The Alamo, popular compositions about the state, and traditional pieces dating from the time of the Battle.

Remembers the Alamo includes one original composition, "Don't Go There", which was written by Benson and the band's drummer David Sanger about the infamous event in 1982 in which heavy metal singer Ozzy Osbourne was arrested for urinating on a memorial for the Battle of the Alamo in San Antonio. Benson, who has described it as "the pièce de résistance" of the record, recalled that "We were doing the album and said, "We've got to do a song about Ozzy." So David went home and thought up the title and most of the words, and I finished it," adding that "We sent a copy of the song to Sharon Osbourne, but nobody has called back."

== Reception ==
Professional ratings
Review scores
Source	Rating
AllMusic	4/5 stars
Orlando Sentinel	4/5 stars

Media response to Asleep at the Wheel Remembers the Alamo was generally positive. Reviewing the album for AllMusic, Thom Jurek described it as "a wonderfully wrought, engaging, enlightening, and thoroughly delightful listening experience," praising Benson for "humaniz[ing] the Alamo for the listener, giv[ing] it faces, feelings, context, and a new kind of endurance that is certainly romantic, but is also far more realistic than most historic accounts." Similarly, Jim Abbott of the Orlando Sentinel wrote that "Benson and his band are well-acquainted with Texas spirit ... That ultimately transforms this album from a lesson into something more memorable."

Reviewers noted the range of material included on the album. Jurek highlighted the mix of "traditional melodies ("Remember the Alamo"), old fiddle tunes ("Soldier's Joy") ... nationalistic anthems ("Davy Crockett"), classic cowboy tunes ("Yellow Rose of Texas") [and] modernist hits (Bob Wills' "New San Antonio Rose")" in his praise of the album, concluding that "Benson's sound world is one that crisscrosses time and space and employs many textures ... as well as his ready (corny) sense of humor". Abbott added that the album successfully mixes "faithful renditions of soundtrack songs ... with the occasional reworked standard or wry original."

"New San Antonio Rose" and "Billy in the Low Ground" were both nominated for Grammy Awards in 2004: the former for Best Country Performance by a Duo or Group with Vocal and the latter for Best Country Instrumental Performance.

== Track listing ==
No.	Title	Writer(s)	Length
1.	"Remember the Alamo/Letter from Col. Travis" (originally recorded by Tex Ritter)	Jane Bowers	5:22
2.	"Green Leaves of Summer" (originally recorded by the Brothers Four)	Paul Francis Webster; Dimitri Tiomkin	3:46
3.	"Billy in the Low Ground" (originally recorded by Fiddlin' John Carson)	Traditional (arr. Ray Benson, Jason Roberts)	1:33
4.	"Ballad of the Alamo" (originally recorded by Marty Robbins)	Webster; Tiomkin	4:16
5.	"Deguello" (originally recorded by Nelson Riddle and His Orchestra)	Traditional (arr. Benson)	2:16
6.	"Ballad of Davy Crockett" (originally recorded by the Mellomen)	George Bruns; Thomas W. Blackburn	3:37
7.	"Yellow Rose of Texas" (originally recorded by Dacosta Woltz's Southern Broadcasters)	Traditional (arr. Benson)	3:23
8.	"New San Antonio Rose" (originally recorded by Bob Wills and His Texas Playboys)	Bob Wills	4:18
9.	"Eighth of January" (originally recorded by Arkansas Barefoot Boys)	Traditional (arr. Benson, Roberts)	1:21
10.	"Across the Alley from the Alamo" (originally recorded by Woody Herman and the Four Chips)	Joe Greene	3:39
11.	"Stout and High" (originally recorded by the Wagoneers)	Monte Warden	4:57
12.	"Don't Go There"	Benson; David Sanger	3:16
13.	"Soldier's Joy" (originally recorded by Fiddlin' John Carson and His Virginia Reelers)	Traditional (arr. Benson, Roberts)	1:19
Total length:			43:03

== Personnel ==
Asleep at the Wheel

- Ray Benson – lead vocals, electric and acoustic guitars, production, engineering, mixing, liner notes
- Haydn Vitera – electric guitar, backing vocals
- Jim Murphy – steel guitar, dobro
- David Miller – bass, backing vocals
- John Michael Whitby – piano
- David Sanger – drums
- Jason Roberts – fiddle, acoustic guitar, backing vocals

Guest performers

- Lisa Tingle – backing vocals (tracks 6, 7 and 12)
- Tosca String Quartet – strings (tracks 2 and 4)
- Gary Slechta – trumpet (tracks 5 and 11)
- Alice Spencer – backing vocals (tracks 6 and 12)
- Kevin Smith – bass (track 7)
- Elizabeth McQueen – backing vocals (track 12)
- George Sanger – trumpet and effects (track 12)

Additional personnel

- James Rabitoy – engineering, mixing, electric guitar (track 12)
- Larry Seyer – engineering, mixing
- Cris Burns – engineering, mixing
- Al Quattrocchi – art direction, design
- Jeff Smith – art direction, design
- Traci Swartz – artwork assistance
- Craig R. Covner – illustrations
- Amanda Custy – photography
