= Morgan's Point, Texas =

- City
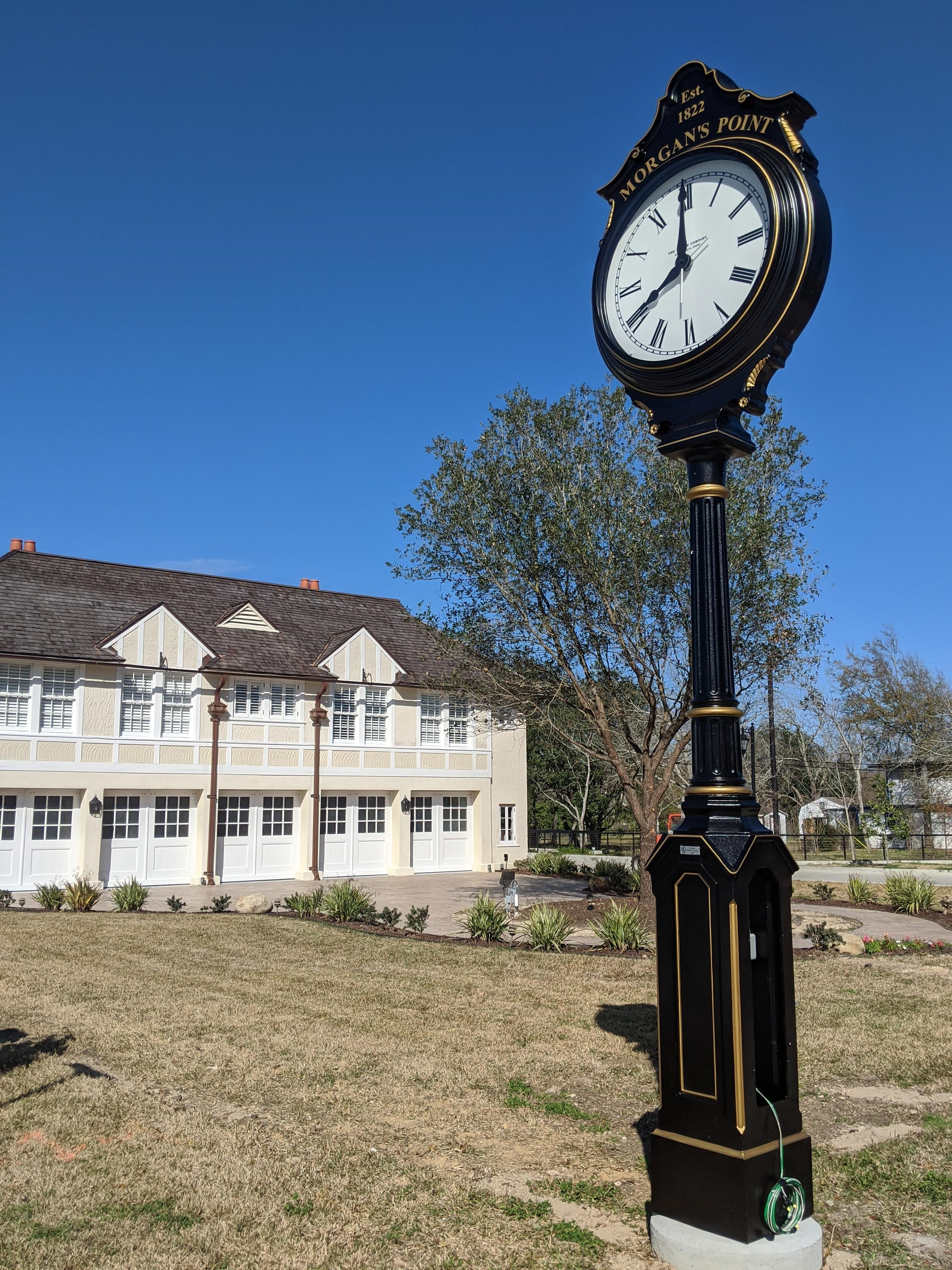
- City Hall of Morgan's Point

- Location in Harris County and the state of Texas
- Coordinates: 29°40′35″N 94°59′58″W
- Country: United States
- State: Texas
- County: Harris

Area
  - Total: 2.23 sq mi (5.78 km^{2})
  - Land: 1.53 sq mi (3.96 km^{2})
  - Water: 0.70 sq mi (1.82 km^{2})
- Elevation: 20 ft (6 m)

Population (2020)
  - Total: 273
  - Density: 179/sq mi (68.9/km^{2})
- Time zone: UTC-6 (Central (CST))
  - Summer (DST): UTC-5 (CDT)
- ZIP code: 77571
- Area codes: 713/281/346/832
- FIPS code: 48-49380
- GNIS feature ID: 1388192
- Website: morganspoint-tx.com

Morgan's Point is located 30 miles (48 km) southeast of Houston in southeastern Harris County, Texas, United States, located on the shores of Galveston Bay at the inlet to the Houston Ship Channel, near La Porte and Baytown. As of the 2020 census, it has 273 residents, and is located within the La Porte Independent School District.

Morgan's Point National Historic District includes the "Carriage House" otherwise known as City Hall, and the Governor Ross S. Sterling mansion, directly across the street; as well as several other notable properties. It earned fame in Texas's early history for being the home of the legendary Emily West (Morgan), known as "The Yellow Rose of Texas". It later became a Houston-area resort community for the wealthy in the early 20th century.

== History ==
The area was first settled in 1822 by Nicholas Rightor, a surveyor commissioned by Stephen F. Austin to explore and survey the areas between the Brazos and Lavaca rivers. He soon sold the property to Johnson Calhoun Hunter, and it subsequently was bought by Joseph C. Clopper, who used the property to grow orange and lemon trees. The property was finally sold to James Morgan in 1834, who established the short-lived colony of New Washington. Morgan had helped supply the Texian army during the Texas Revolution and was given the rank of colonel. The settlement was destroyed by the Mexican army during the Texas Revolution. A legend surfaced much later surrounding a mulatto woman named Emily West. She became an indentured servant (but not a slave) of Morgan and, according to legend, used her beauty to occupy Mexican General Santa Anna, thereby facilitating his capture by the Texan army, thus ending the revolutionary war. Historians differ on the degree of truth of this legend.

The area began to redevelop as the Houston Ship Channel was dredged near the area in the later 19th century. The community grew around traffic crossing the ship channel to and from Goose Creek (now Baytown). Ferry service would eventually become established. The Morgan Point Ferry operated until the mid 20th century.

Following the start of the Texas oil boom in 1901 Galveston Bay became an attractive summer destination for the wealthy from Houston and nearby areas. Plots along Bayridge Road were sold for the construction of summer homes, including the famed Sterling Mansion, a former governor's residence that is now a landmark (not to be confused with the mansion in Houston). During the 1920s and 1930s the shoreline between Morgan's Point and Sylvan Beach came to be known as the Texas "Gold Coast", a playground for the rich.

As the surrounding communities of La Porte and Baytown grew, interest in the area as a summer haven diminished. Morgan's Point was finally incorporated in 1949, and a small community remained. Some of the original 19th century buildings have remained, as well as early 20th century homes.

The area received a major economic boost in 1977 with the opening of the Barbours Cut shipping terminal, operated by the Port of Houston Authority. However, in building Barbours Cut, the Port of Houston used its power of eminent domain to evict residents from nearly one third of the community's homes. Still the terminal almost instantly became the Houston area's most important shipping point and became the centerpiece of the economy activity at Morgan's Point.

== Geography ==
Morgan's Point is located in Southeastern Harris County at 29°40′35″N 94°59′58″W (29.676368, –94.999580). It is bordered to the north and west by the city of La Porte, and to the southeast by Shoreacres, Texas. The city limits extend out into Galveston Bay, within Chambers County. It is 27 miles (43 km) Southeast of the center of Houston.

According to the United States Census Bureau, the city has a total area of 1.7 square miles (4.5 km^{2}), of which 1.5 square miles (4.0 km^{2}) are land and 0.2 square miles (0.5 km^{2}), or 11.12%, are water.

== Demographics ==
Historical population
Census	Pop.	Note	%±
1950	656		—
1960	560		−14.6%
1970	593		5.9%
1980	428		−27.8%
1990	341		−20.3%
2000	336		−1.5%
2010	339		0.9%
2020	273		−19.5%
U.S. Decennial Census; 2020 Census

=== Racial and ethnic composition ===
Morgan's Point city, Texas – Racial and ethnic composition Note: the US Census treats Hispanic/Latino as an ethnic category. This table excludes Latinos from the racial categories and assigns them to a separate category. Hispanics/Latinos may be of any race.
Race / Ethnicity (NH = Non-Hispanic)	Pop 2000	Pop 2010	Pop 2020	% 2000	% 2010	% 2020
White alone (NH)	270	208	175	80.36%	61.36%	64.10%
Black or African American alone (NH)	15	34	11	4.46%	10.03%	4.03%
Native American or Alaska Native alone (NH)	3	5	1	0.89%	1.47%	0.37%
Asian alone (NH)	0	2	2	0.00%	0.59%	0.73%
Native Hawaiian or Pacific Islander alone (NH)	0	0	0	0.00%	0.00%	0.00%
Other race alone (NH)	0	0	0	0.00%	0.00%	0.00%
Mixed race or Multiracial (NH)	5	5	11	1.49%	1.47%	4.03%
Hispanic or Latino (any race)	43	85	73	12.80%	25.07%	26.74%
Total	336	339	273	100.00%	100.00%	100.00%

=== 2020 census ===
As of the 2020 census, Morgan's Point had a population of 273. The median age was 48.8 years. 25.3% of residents were under the age of 18 and 26.0% of residents were 65 years of age or older. For every 100 females there were 85.7 males, and for every 100 females age 18 and over there were 88.9 males age 18 and over.

100.0% of residents lived in urban areas, while 0.0% lived in rural areas.

There were 103 households in Morgan's Point, of which 29.1% had children under the age of 18 living in them. Of all households, 50.5% were married-couple households, 16.5% were households with a male householder and no spouse or partner present, and 29.1% were households with a female householder and no spouse or partner present. About 23.4% of all households were made up of individuals and 15.5% had someone living alone who was 65 years of age or older.

There were 134 housing units, of which 23.1% were vacant. The homeowner vacancy rate was 2.0% and the rental vacancy rate was 23.5%.

Racial composition as of the 2020 census
Race	Number	Percent
White	201	73.6%
Black or African American	12	4.4%
American Indian and Alaska Native	2	0.7%
Asian	3	1.1%
Native Hawaiian and Other Pacific Islander	0	0.0%
Some other race	10	3.7%
Two or more races	45	16.5%
Hispanic or Latino (of any race)	73	26.7%

=== 2000 census ===
As of the census of 2000, there were 336 people, 111 households, and 85 families residing in the city. The population density was 208.1 inhabitants per square mile (80.3/km^{2}). There were 143 housing units at an average density of 88.6 per square mile (34.2/km^{2}). The racial makeup of the city was 88.69% White, 4.46% African American, 0.89% Native American, 4.46% from other races, and 1.49% from two or more races. Hispanic or Latino of any race were 12.80% of the population.

There were 111 households, out of which 19.8% had children under the age of 18 living with them, 64.9% were married couples living together, 9.0% had a female householder with no husband present, and 23.4% were non-families. 23.4% of all households were made up of individuals, and 9.9% had someone living alone who was 65 years of age or older. The average household size was 2.32 and the average family size was 2.64.

In the city, the population was spread out, with 32.4% under the age of 18, 5.7% from 18 to 24, 19.9% from 25 to 44, 28.0% from 45 to 64, and 14.0% who were 65 years of age or older. The median age was 38 years. For every 100 females, there were 114.0 males. For every 100 females age 18 and over, there were 102.7 males.

The median income for a household in the city was $57,917, and the median income for a family was $71,458. Males had a median income of $40,313 versus $30,625 for females. The per capita income for the city was $32,446. None of the families and 2.2% of the population were living below the poverty line, including none under eighteen and none of those over 64.

== Government and infrastructure ==
The nearest public hospital is Ben Taub General Hospital in the Texas Medical Center.

== Education ==
Morgan's Point is within the La Porte Independent School District, and is zoned to: La Porte Elementary School, La Porte Junior High School, and La Porte High School.

Residents of La Porte ISD (and therefore Morgan's Point) are zoned to San Jacinto College.

== Gallery ==
Depictions of Morgan's Point, Texas

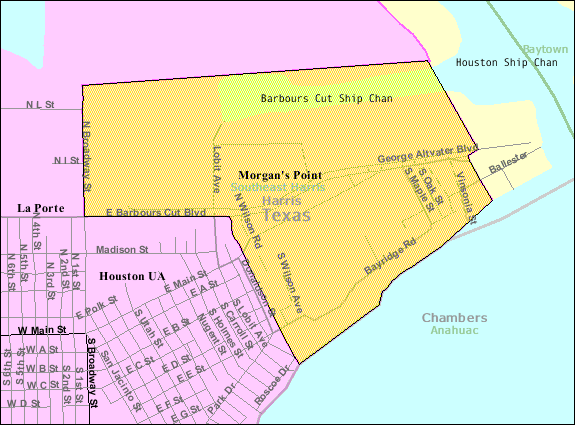
Map of Morgan's Point

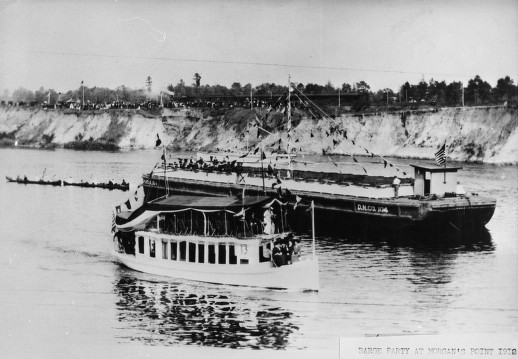
Morgan's Point (1912)

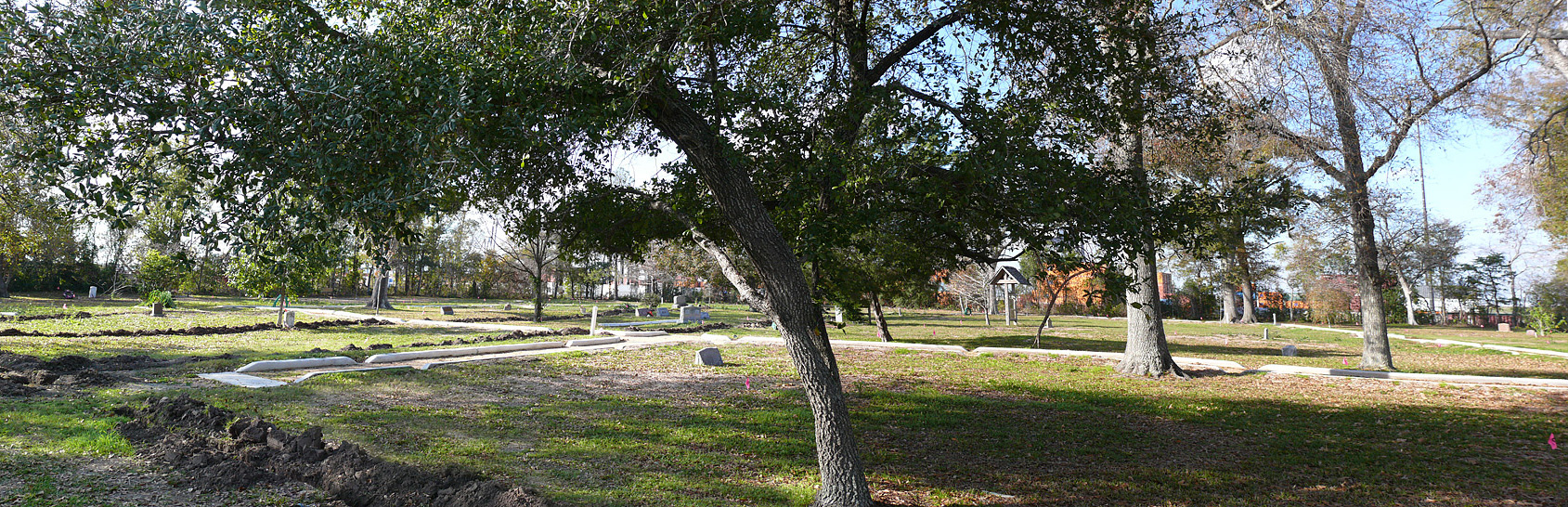
Morgan's Point Cemetery

== See also ==
- Emily D. West
- The Yellow Rose of Texas (song)
- Galveston Bay Area
- Greater Houston
