= Texas Gold Coast =

The term Texas Gold Coast has been used to refer to different locations along the Texas Coastal Bend.

- South Padre Island, Texas
- The Corpus Christi, Texas area
- The strip of shoreline in the Galveston Bay Area between Morgan's Point and Sylvan Beach. This term was largely used in the early 20th century.
