= Lomax, La Porte, Texas =

Neighborhood of La Porte in Harris, Texas, United States

Coordinates: 29.680°N 95.066°W

Lomax is a neighborhood of La Porte, a city in Harris County, Texas, United States. Lomax once was a separate community.

The community was named after R.A. Lomax, a native of Illinois who went to the area in 1885 and donated land for a school.

Lomax incorporated in 1952 and became a city in 1966. In 1980 it was merged into the city of La Porte.

On January 19, 1980, people in Lomax approved the referendum to combine with La Porte. In La Porte, in April 1980, 755 people voted in favor of merging with Lomax and 358 voted against. This meant the U.S. Department of Justice would review and approve the merger proposal.

== Education ==
Like all areas of La Porte, Lomax is in the La Porte Independent School District.

Residents are zoned to the following schools; all of them are in La Porte:

- Lomax Elementary School
- Baker Sixth Grade Campus
- Lomax Junior High School
- La Porte High School
