= La Porte Independent School District =

School district in Texas, United States

Address
- 1002 San Jacinto St La Porte, Texas, 77571; United States

District information
- Type: Public
- Grades: PK–12
- Schools: 12
- NCES District ID: 4826190

Students and staff
- Students: 7,115 (2023–2024)
- Teachers: 465.41 (on an FTE basis) (2023–2024)
- Staff: 619.81 (on an FTE basis) (2023–2024)
- Student–teacher ratio: 15.29 (2023–2024)

Other information
- Website: www.lpisd.org

La Porte Independent School District is a school district based in La Porte, Texas, United States.

The district serves the city of La Porte, including Lomax, which was once an incorporated city but is now part of La Porte. Morgan's Point, Shoreacres and small portions of Pasadena and Deer Park. In addition to Harris County, the district's territory extends into water within Chambers County. In 2011, La Porte ISD's Lomax Elementary won the national Blue Ribbon School Award.

== School board ==
- Dr. Walter Jackson - Superintendent
- Danny Hanks - President
- Russell Shoppe - Vice President
- Jeff Martin - Secretary
- Melissa Crutcher - Trustee
- David Janda - Trustee
- Mason Peres - Trustee
- Dee Anne Thompson - Trustee

== History ==
La Porte Independent School District was formed in 1916 and a new three-story red-brick building was constructed near Broadway and "C" streets which would house the bused-in additional students from Lomax and Morgan's Point. In 1917, the student body selected orange and white as the school colors, and the bulldog as the school mascot. They also published a one-time-only yearbook called Europol, an anadrome of La Porte.

During the years of the depression, 1918-1924 that followed in the wake of World War I many citizens were unable to pay their taxes, and as a result, the school term lasted only six months.

In 1921, Mr. C. E. Wade was appointed principal, and he organized the first football team, orchestra, choral club and "mothers' club" during his first year. In 1935, the second yearbook, The LPHS Daze, had a one-time publication by Lynnwood Anderson, editor-in-chief; there was not another yearbook published until 1946 and it was named The Reflector as it stands to date.

In 1940, La Porte Elementary was built to accommodate students in grades one through six. The existing building continued to house grades seven through twelve. In 1943, disaster struck the system in the form of "The 1943 Hurricane." The top two floors were severely damaged and were removed. The remaining first floor was repaired and 12 classrooms, a cafeteria, music rooms, a manual training room, athletic dressing rooms and showers, storage units, and a tax office were added to make this the junior high and high school.

In 1945, a new gymnasium/auditorium was constructed on Broadway between the elementary school and the newly remodeled school. A new high school was also built that year, now the old part of La Porte Junior High. In 1948, the elementary school had a new wing added and a new Intermediate school was built.

Records show that La Porte district schools were segregated until the 1960s. Paralleling the history of the all-white schools, La Porte black students were housed in temporary facilities until a school of their own was built and until they joined the all-white students in the district's schools. In 1909, a Baptist church was used during the week for black students and later a Methodist church was purchased for their use by the La Porte Independent School District. Miss Viola DeWald was the first teacher of this school. In 1953, DeWald Elementary was opened as a neighborhood school for black children, and grades one through eight were taught in this building. Grades nine through twelve were sent by bus to Carver High School in Baytown, Texas. The La Porte school system was one of the first districts in the country to fully integrate its student body and facilities in 1963–1964. This set an important precedent of peaceful desegregation for the state as well as the country.

The school district purchased 44.8 acres (181,000 m^{2}) in 1959 on "J" Street (now Fairmont Parkway) and built a new La Porte High School, housing grades nine through twelve. The old high school then became the La Porte Junior High as it stands today.

In 1963, the first fully air-conditioned school in the district, James H. Baker Elementary, was opened for students in the Fairmont Park area. This school later became Baker Junior High, but is now the sixth-grade campus for the entire district.

In 1964, the high school added a planetarium, and "E" building wing, and in 1972 a new library wing was added. Since 1966, the district has changed boundaries, annexed several communities, and built and remodeled campuses all over the city. For students in the south Bayshore and Shore acres areas, Bayshore Elementary was opened in 1966; students in the College Park area were sent to College Park Elementary(1969); students in Lomax (annexed by La Porte as West La Porte) were sent to the newly built Lomax Elementary in 1976. Jennie Reid Elementary 1977 and Leo Rizzuto Elementary Schools were built to accommodate the students in the Fairmont Park area(1981). Lomax Junior High was built in 1986 to accommodate the growth that La Porte Junior High could not support. Over the years the La Porte High School has expanded to include: The Sonja Angelo Theater, a basketball gymnasium, a swimming pool complex, a vocational building, a student center, and the Henry Enfield Band Hall. In 1996, a new field house and a science building were added. The La Porte Independent School District currently has a population of over 31,880.

In 2015 and 2018, each of the 12 campuses was either renovated or rebuilt entirely as a result of a $260 million bond approved by voters in 2014. Some of the highlights include the Bulldog Centre, a multipurpose facility – for athletics, fine arts, and community events – that can accommodate about 2,300 people; the Pemberton Planetarium, a technologically advanced planetarium for its class; and facilities that were built or retrofitted to improve the safety and security of the 7,200 students and 1,100 staff members.

== Schools ==
=== Secondary schools ===
==== High schools ====
- La Porte High School (La Porte)
- La Porte ISD Academy of Viola DeWald High School (La Porte)

==== Junior high schools ====
===== 7-8 =====
- La Porte Junior High School (La Porte)
- Lomax Junior High School (La Porte)

===== 6 =====
- James H. Baker Sixth Grade Campus (La Porte)

=== Elementary schools ===
- Bayshore (La Porte)
- College Park (Deer Park)
- Heritage (Deer Park)
- La Porte (La Porte)
- Lomax (La Porte)
- Jennie Reid (La Porte)
- Leo A. Rizzuto (La Porte)

== Other facilities ==
- La Porte ISD Administration Building
- Instructional Technology Center
- Support Services Center
- Special Programs

== Notable people ==
- Terrel Bernard, NFL linebacker
- Jessica Boone, film, stage, and voice actress
- Kerron Clement, Olympic track and field medalist
- Curvin Richards, NFL running back
- Shaun Rogers, NFL defensive lineman
- L. Neil Smith, science fiction author and political activist
- Gene Washington, NFL wide receiver
