= Emily D. West =

Folk heroine

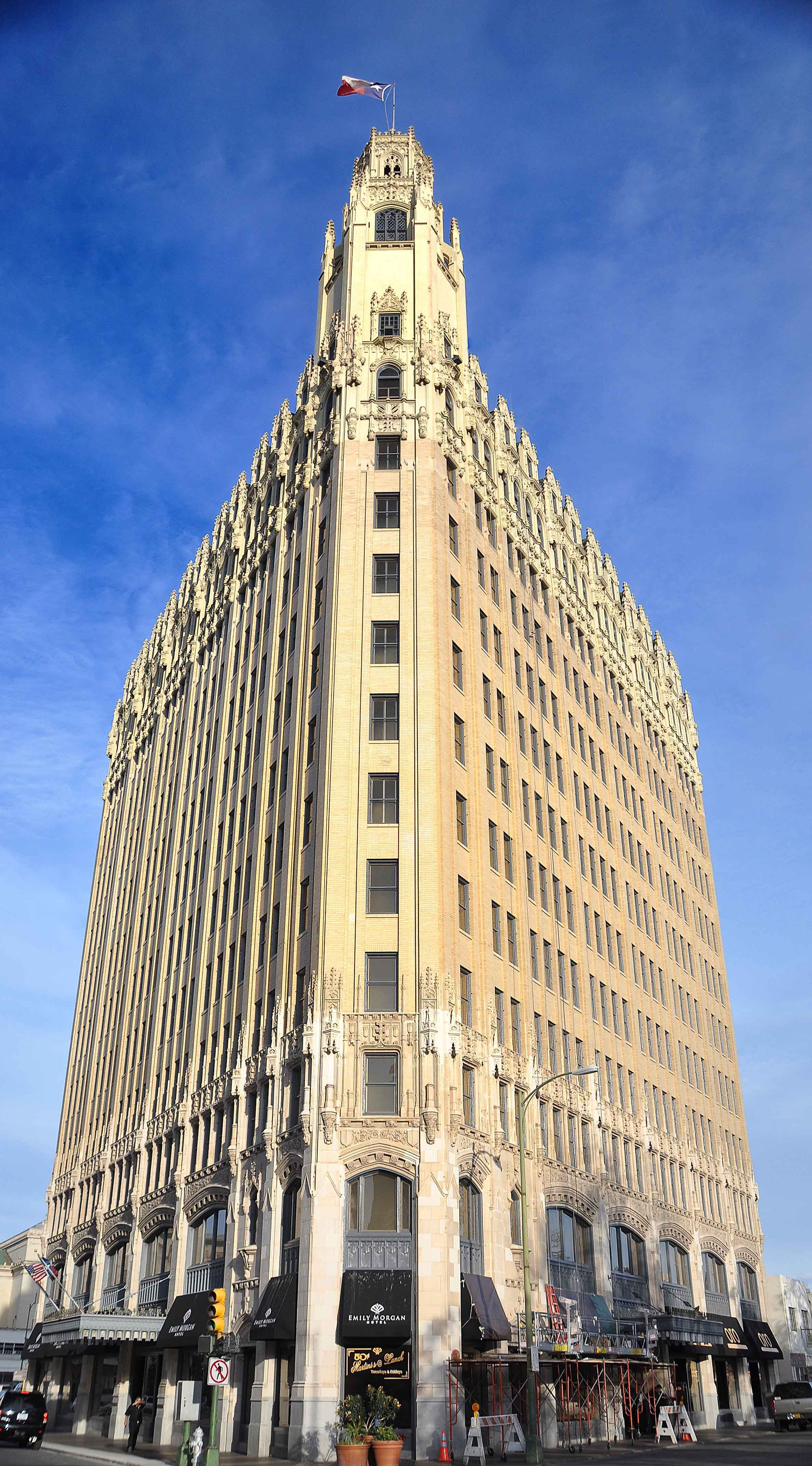
The Emily Morgan Hotel, in downtown San Antonio, is named in honor of the Texas heroine

Emily D. West (c.1815–1891), also known as Emily Morgan, is a folk heroine whose legendary activities during the Texas Revolution have come to be identified with the song "The Yellow Rose of Texas".

== Biography ==
West was a mixed-race free woman of color, or a "high yellow", and Connecticuter born in New Haven.

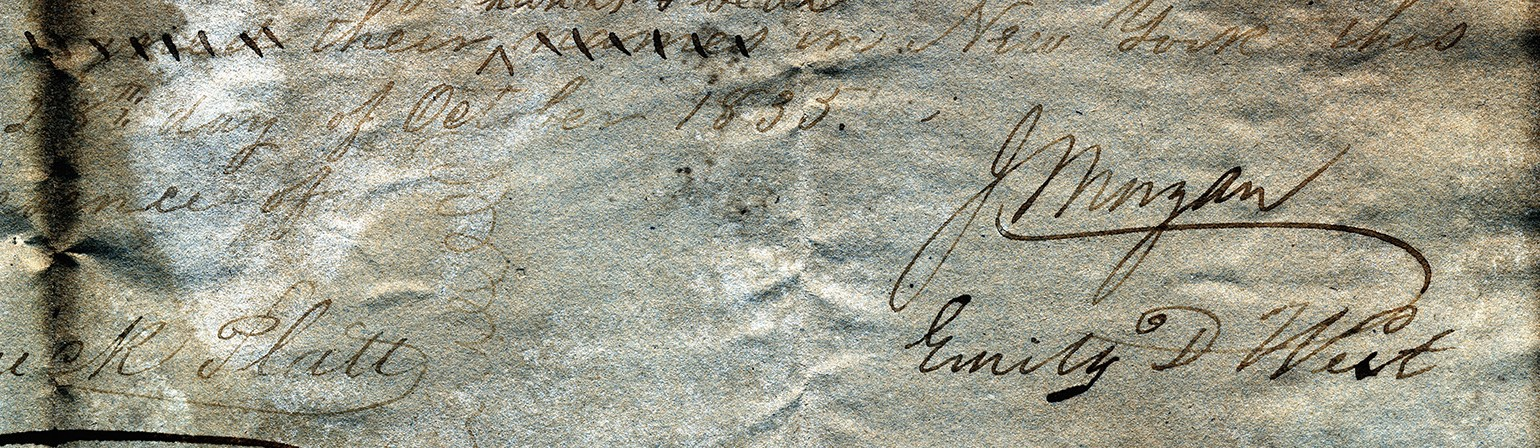
Signatures of Emily West and James Morgan on employment contract of October 28, 1835.

In 1835 she was contracted to James Morgan in New York to work as an indentured servant for one year in Morgan's Point (at that time still in the Mexican state of Coahuila y Tejas), at the New Washington Association's hotel as a housekeeper. Several months into her year of indentureship, on April 16, 1836, West and other residents were kidnapped by Mexican cavalry. West was forced to travel with the forces of General Antonio López de Santa Anna as they prepared to face the army led by Sam Houston, and was in the Mexican camp on April 21 when Houston's force attacked. The Texans won the Battle of San Jacinto in 18 minutes.

According to legend, Santa Anna had been caught unprepared because he was having sex with West. No contemporary accounts indicate that Santa Anna was with a woman at the time, but the story was recorded in the journal of Englishman William Bollaert in 1842, who was told the story by Sam Houston during a steamer trip. After Bollaert's diary was published in 1956, amateur historians began to expand the tale, with Henderson Shuffler suggesting that West fit the description of the girl in the then-popular folk song "The Yellow Rose of Texas." The story continued to grow, with many references to West's beauty, as the legend took hold by the 1986 Texas Sesquicentennial.

Historian Philip Thomas Tucker questions the reliability of the tale pointing out that "Santa Anna possessed a distinct aversion to the intermingling of races." Santa Anna held that much of Mexico's political troubles were due to this, holding that "We have failed because of our deplorable racial mixture, and the responsibility for this sad state of affairs lies with the Spanish missionaries who saved the Indian from extinction."

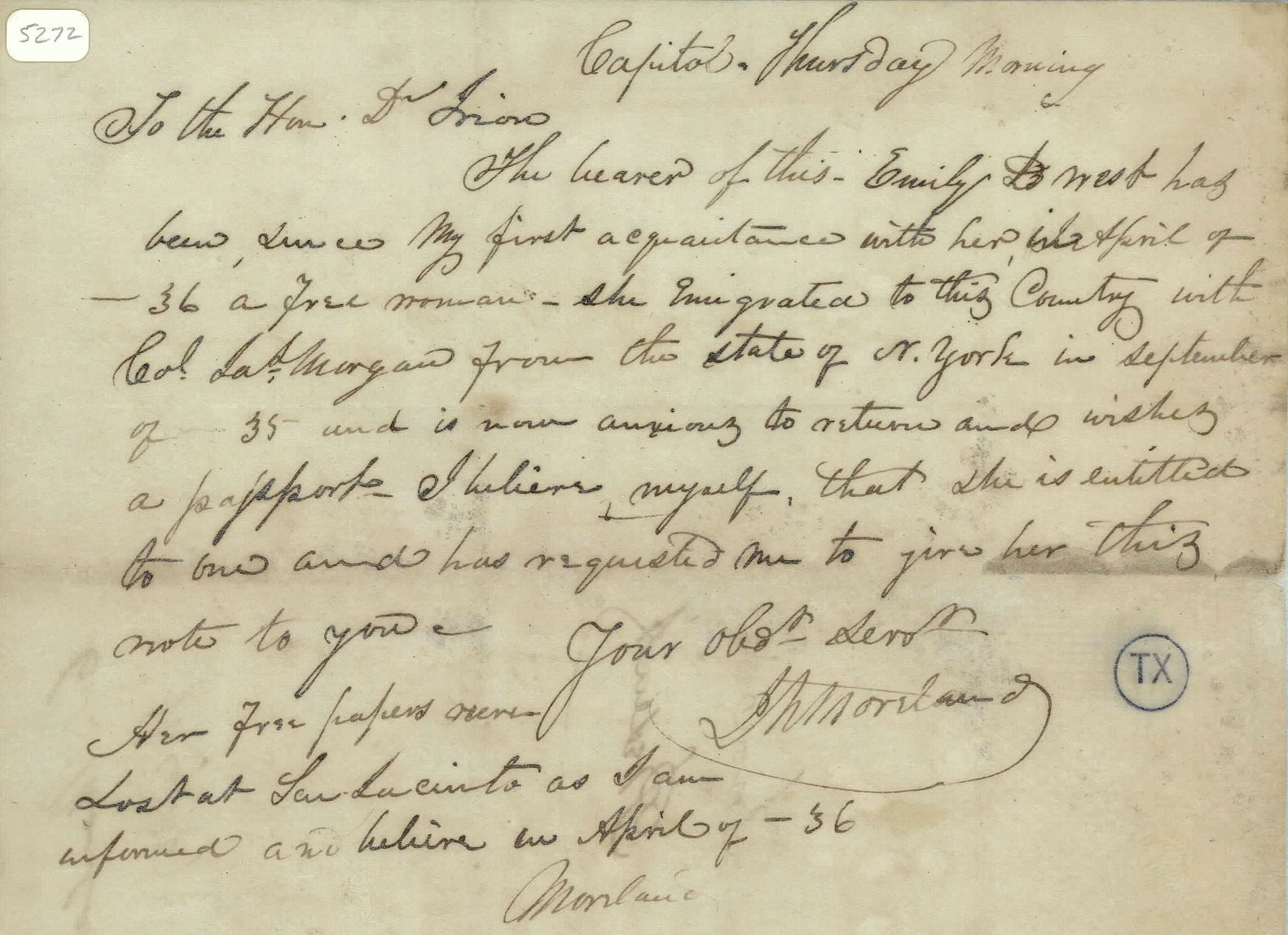
Passport of Emily D West issued by the Department of State, Republic of Texas, in 1837.

After the Battle of San Jacinto, the real Emily West wanted to leave Texas, but the papers that declared her "free" had been lost. Major Isaac Moreland, commandant of the garrison at Galveston, vouched for Emily in her application for a passport. Emily possibly returned to New York in March 1837.

== Name controversy ==
It is unknown if she did carry James Morgan's surname, as was supposed, although this was the custom for indentured servants and slaves at the time. Also, arriving coincidentally in Morgan's Point on board Morgan's schooner from New York was Emily West de Zavala, the wife of the interim vice president of the Republic of Texas, Lorenzo de Zavala, and grandmother of Adina Emilia De Zavala. The widowed Mrs Lorenzo de Zavala had returned to New York in 1837 at about the same time as Emily D. West, although West de Zavala returned to Texas in early 1839. Denise McVea suggests that the Emily West of the Yellow Rose of Texas legend was Emily West de Zavala. There is no contemporary or primary evidence that Emily D. West and Emily de Zavala were the same person.

== In popular culture ==
In the History Channel miniseries Texas Rising, West is portrayed by actress Cynthia Addai-Robinson. A statue of her can also be found on the grounds of the Alamo in San Antonio (with the plaque calling her Emily West Morgan).
