= Shoreacres, Texas =

- City
- Location in Harris County and the state of Texas
- Coordinates: 29°37′12″N 95°1′6″W
- Country: United States
- State: Texas
- Counties: Harris, Chambers (water only)

Area
  - Total: 0.96 sq mi (2.49 km^{2})
  - Land: 0.91 sq mi (2.35 km^{2})
  - Water: 0.054 sq mi (0.14 km^{2})
- Elevation: 10 ft (3.0 m)

Population (2020)
  - Total: 1,566
  - Density: 1,758.6/sq mi (679.01/km^{2})
- Time zone: UTC-6 (Central (CST))
  - Summer (DST): UTC-5 (CDT)
- ZIP code: 77571
- Area code: 281
- FIPS code: 48-67688
- GNIS feature ID: 2411892
- Website: www.shoreacrestx.us

Shoreacres was a city located in Harris County in the U.S. state of Texas alongside State Highway 146. Areas of water under Shoreacres jurisdiction were in Chambers County. Established with a mayor-alderman form of city government, it was incorporated in 1949. The population was 1,566 at the 2020 census.

The City of Shoreacres, Texas consolidated with the city of La Porte, Texas after residents of both cities voted for consolidation on May 2, 2026. The consolidation became effective on May 11, 2026, with the City of Shoreacres consolidating with the City of La Porte and the City of Shoreacres dissolving as a city.

Larry Terry described the former municipality in its early history as "a respite from big city life in Houston, an enclave of summer bay homes".

== History ==
In 1925 the first houses were built. Shoreacres became an incorporated municipality in 1949.

After the Johnson Space Center was built in 1960, more people looked for houses in Shoreacres.

=== Hurricane Ike ===
On September 13, Hurricane Ike made landfall near Galveston, with, according to one artice, 88 percent of the homes in Shoreacres suffering flood damage. Another article stated that about 14% houses were destroyed by Ike, and in total about 83% of the houses had been flooded in Ike. In 2012 Lomi Kriel of the Houston Chronicle wrote that Shoreacres was "Ike's worst victim in Harris County." No local deaths were reported.

The community was significantly affected by the hurricane. By November of 2008, about 50% of the residents came back. Ike severely damaged the financial situation of Shoreacres as it only had one business, the Houston Yacht Club, and had a 23% decline in tax money. That year, according to Kriel, Ike was "a daily conversation topic that inspires heated emails and leaves residents in tears." According to Kriel, by 2012 the community was significantly recovering from Ike.

=== Merger ===
In 2018 there were plans to put a proposed annexation into La Porte on the ballot for Shoreacres residents, but the State of Texas told the Shoreacres government that La Porte residents also needed to vote on the proposal, and without that, the referendum could not go forward. The plans were shelved for the time being.

On May 2, 2026 the voters of Shoreacres and La Porte voted to consolidate the City of Shoreacres into the City of La Porte. On May 11, 2026, after both cities canvassed the election, the consolidation became effective.

== Geography ==
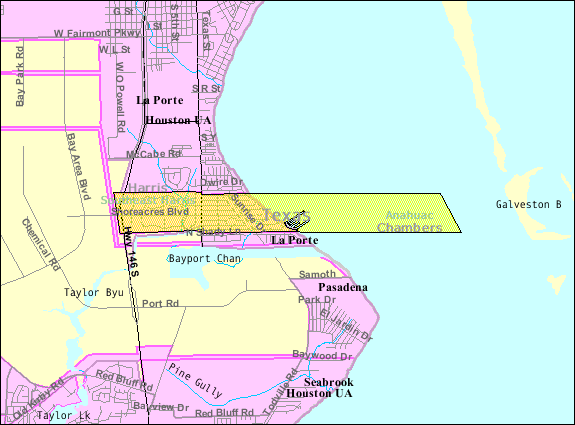
Map of Shoreacres

According to the United States Census Bureau, the former city has a total area of 0.97 square miles (2.5 km^{2}), of which 0.93 square miles (2.4 km^{2}) is land and 0.039 square miles (0.1 km^{2}), or 5.86%, is water.

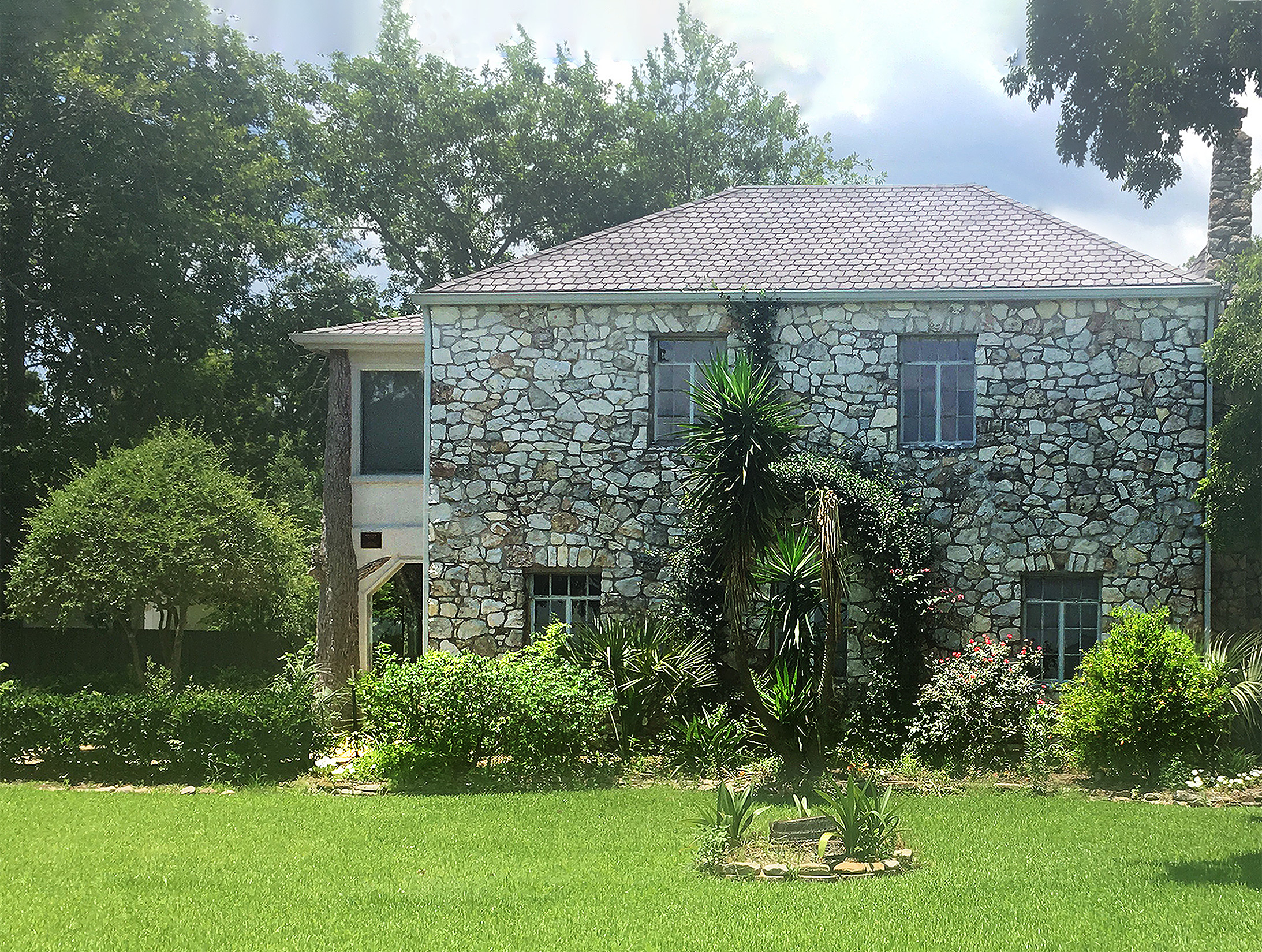
Isaiah P. Walker House on the National Register of Historic Places

Terry described the housing as "not just for the rich, but certainly only for those with discretionary income."

== Demographics ==
Historical population
Census	Pop.	Note	%±
1950	183		—
1960	518		183.1%
1970	1,872		261.4%
1980	1,260		−32.7%
1990	1,316		4.4%
2000	1,488		13.1%
2010	1,493		0.3%
2020	1,566		4.9%
U.S. Decennial Census

=== Racial and ethnic composition ===
Shoreacres city, Texas – Racial and ethnic composition Note: the US Census treats Hispanic/Latino as an ethnic category. This table excludes Latinos from the racial categories and assigns them to a separate category. Hispanics/Latinos may be of any race.
Race / Ethnicity (NH = Non-Hispanic)	Pop 2000	Pop 2010	Pop 2020	% 2000	% 2010	% 2020
White alone (NH)	1,333	1,174	1,113	89.58%	78.63%	71.07%
Black or African American alone (NH)	15	22	27	1.01%	1.47%	1.72%
Native American or Alaska Native alone (NH)	1	8	15	0.07%	0.54%	0.96%
Asian alone (NH)	14	8	16	0.94%	0.54%	1.02%
Native Hawaiian or Pacific Islander alone (NH)	1	0	0	0.07%	0.00%	0.00%
Other race alone (NH)	1	3	10	0.07%	0.20%	0.64%
Mixed race or Multiracial (NH)	9	18	54	0.60%	1.21%	3.45%
Hispanic or Latino (any race)	114	260	331	7.66%	17.41%	21.14%
Total	1,488	1,493	1,566	100.00%	100.00%	100.00%

=== 2020 census ===
As of the 2020 census, there were 1,566 people, 613 households, and 366 families residing in the city. The median age was 44.5 years; 19.5% of residents were under the age of 18 and 17.4% of residents were 65 years of age or older. For every 100 females there were 102.6 males, and for every 100 females age 18 and over there were 103.4 males age 18 and over.

100.0% of residents lived in urban areas, while 0.0% lived in rural areas.

There were 613 households in Shoreacres, of which 29.9% had children under the age of 18 living in them. Of all households, 56.3% were married-couple households, 18.6% were households with a male householder and no spouse or partner present, and 17.6% were households with a female householder and no spouse or partner present. About 17.7% of all households were made up of individuals and 8.5% had someone living alone who was 65 years of age or older.

There were 649 housing units, of which 5.5% were vacant. The homeowner vacancy rate was 0.7% and the rental vacancy rate was 10.1%.

Racial composition as of the 2020 census
Race	Number	Percent
White	1,195	76.3%
Black or African American	31	2.0%
American Indian and Alaska Native	19	1.2%
Asian	16	1.0%
Native Hawaiian and Other Pacific Islander	3	0.2%
Some other race	105	6.7%
Two or more races	197	12.6%
Hispanic or Latino (of any race)	331	21.1%

=== 2000 census ===
As of the 2000 census, there were 1,488 people, 559 households, and 455 families residing in the city. The population density was 1,656.1 inhabitants per square mile (639.4/km^{2}). There were 594 housing units at an average density of 661.1 units per square mile (255.3 units/km^{2}). The racial makeup of the city was 94.15% White, 1.01% African American, 0.07% Native American, 0.94% Asian, 0.07% Pacific Islander, 2.96% from other races, and 0.81% from two or more races. Hispanic or Latino of any race were 7.66% of the population.

There were 559 households, out of which 32.2% had children under the age of 18 living with them, 72.1% were married couples living together, 5.9% had a female householder with no husband present, and 18.6% were non-families. 15.6% of all households were made up of individuals, and 7.3% had someone living alone who was 65 years of age or older. The average household size was 2.66 and the average family size was 2.96.

In the city, the population was spread out, with 23.9% under the age of 18, 6.0% from 18 to 24, 28.2% from 25 to 44, 30.4% from 45 to 64, and 11.4% who were 65 years of age or older. The median age was 41 years. For every 100 females, there were 102.2 males. For every 100 females age 18 and over, there were 100.4 males.

The median income for a household in the city was $71,985, and the median income for a family was $75,941. Males had a median income of $51,523 versus $31,389 for females. The per capita income for the city was $29,370. About 1.1% of families and 1.8% of the population were below the poverty line, including 0.5% of those under age 18 and 2.8% of those age 65 or over.

== Economy ==
The Houston Yacht Club appeared in Shoreacres in 1927. In 2001 it was the only business in the municipality. Therefore it was the only entity giving tax money to the city that was not a homeowner. This meant that an event that effected this business, such as Hurricane Ike in 2008, could significantly damage the municipality's tax base, and the hurricane did so.

== Education ==
The former area of Shoreacres is within the La Porte Independent School District and is zoned to: Bayshore Elementary School, La Porte Junior High School, and La Porte High School.

Residents of La Porte ISD (and therefore Shoreacres) are zoned to San Jacinto College.

== Government ==
Shoreacres was governed by a five-member city council under the city manager form of government as adopted under ORDINANCE No. 2017-266 that was approved by city council June 12, 2017. Council members served staggered two-year terms. In 2001 the form of government used aldermen and not regular city council members. The Shoreacres city government provided police, recycling, parks, planning, zoning, floodplain management, and building code inspections among its services. The city government provided fire, sanitation, and emergency medical services by contract. In 2001 the city used the La Porte Fire Department to provide fire protection. At that time, the municipality had a budget of $1,000,000.

Since 2026, the La Porte Municipal Court is now the municipal court for Shoreacres residents, the La Porte Public Works Department covers such services, and the La Porte Police Department has covered Shoreacres in Patrol District 1. Shoreacres is in La Porte city council district 5.

Harris Health System (formerly Harris County Hospital District) designated Strawberry Health Center in Pasadena for ZIP code 77571. The nearest public hospital is Ben Taub General Hospital in the Texas Medical Center.

== Transportation ==
Harris County Transit operates public transportation.

== See also ==
History of the Galveston Bay Area
