= High yellow =

Historic American term; light-skinned person with white and black ancestors

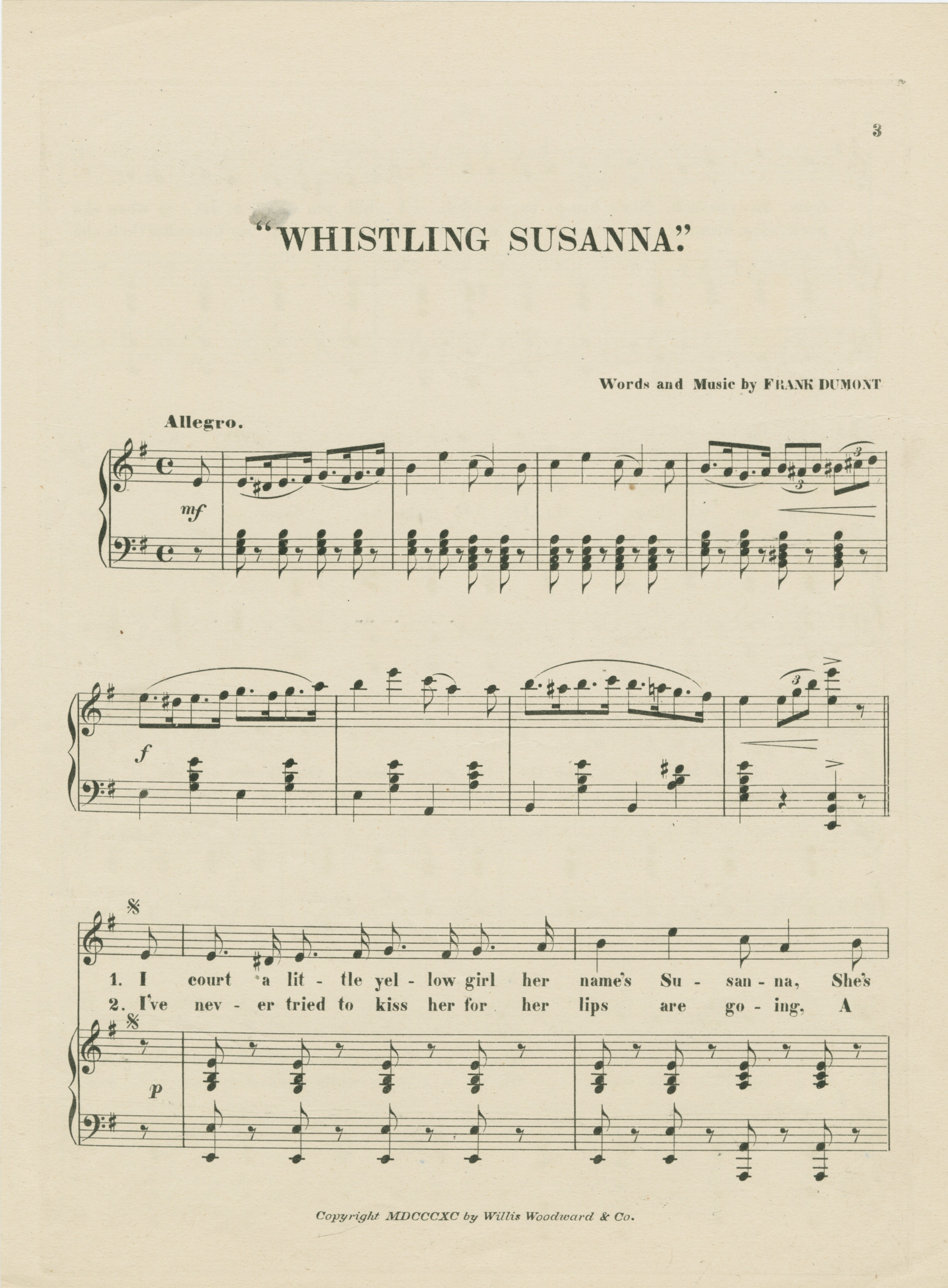
Sheet music for "Whistling Susanna," which begins "I court a little yellow girl, her name's Susanna, she's from Savannah, she's happy as a bird."

High yellow (dialect: yaller, yella) is a term used to describe a light-skinned black person in the United States.

== Etymology ==
"High" is usually considered a reference to a social class system in which skin color (and associated ancestries) is a major factor, placing those of lighter skin (with more white ancestry) at the top and those of darker skin at the bottom. High yellows, while still considered part of the African-American ethnic group, were thought to gain privileges because of their skin and ancestry. "Yellow" is in reference to the usually very pale undertone to the skin color of members of this group, due to mixture with white people. Another reading of the etymology of the word "high" is that it is a slang word for "very", often used in Southern English, therefore "very yellow" (as opposed to brown).

== Use as social class distinction ==
In an aspect of colorism, "high yellow" was also related to social class distinctions among people of color. In post-Civil War South Carolina, and according to one account by historian Edward Ball, "Members of the colored elite were called 'high yellow' for their shade of skin", as well as slang terms meaning snobbish. In his biography of Duke Ellington, a native of Washington, D.C., David Bradbury wrote that Washington's social life was dominated by light-skinned 'high yellow' families, some pale enough to 'pass for white,' who shunned and despised darker African-Americans. The behaviour of high yellow society was a replica of high white, except that whereas the white woman invested in tightly curled permanents and, at least if young, cultivated a deep sun tan, the colored woman used bleach lotions and Mrs. Walker's "Anti-Kink" or the equivalent to straighten hair.

In some cases the confusion of color with class came about because some of the lighter-skinned black people came from families of mixed heritage free before the Civil War, who had begun to accumulate education and property. In addition, some wealthier white planters made an effort to have their "natural sons" (the term for children outside of marriage who were produced with enslaved women) educated or trained as apprentices; some passed on property to them. For instance, in 1860, most of the 200 subscription students at Wilberforce University were the mixed-race sons of white planters, who paid for their education.

These social distinctions made the cosmopolitan Harlem more appealing to many black people. The Cotton Club of the Prohibition era "had a segregated, white-only audience policy and a color-conscious, 'high yellow' hiring policy for chorus girls". It was common for lighter-skinned African Americans to hold "paper bag parties," which admitted only those whose complexion was lighter than that of a brown paper bag.

In her 1942 Glossary of Harlem Slang, Zora Neale Hurston placed "high yaller" at the beginning of the entry for colorscale, which ran:

high yaller, yaller, high brown, vaseline brown, seal brown, low brown, dark brown

== Applied to individuals ==
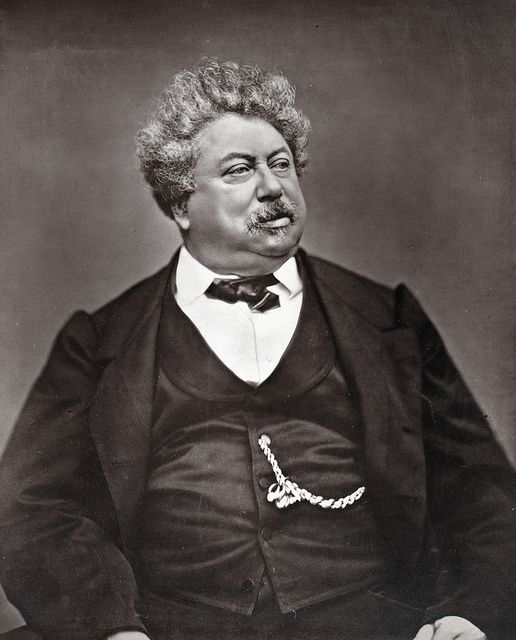
Quadroon novelist Alexandre Dumas, père was called "High Yellow" in a 1929 issue of Time magazine.

The French author Alexandre Dumas père was the son of a French mulatto general (born in Saint-Domingue but educated by his father in France) and his French wife. He was described as having skin "with a yellow so high it was almost white". In a 1929 review, Time referred to him as a "High Yellow Fictioneer".

Singer Eartha Kitt was taunted by darker-skinned relatives and called that "yella gal" during her childhood.

== Art and popular culture ==
The terminology and its cultural aspects were explored in Dael Orlandersmith's play Yellowman, a 2002 Pulitzer Prize Finalist in drama. The play depicts a dark-skinned girl whose own mother "inadvertently teaches her the pain of rejection and the importance of being accepted by the 'high yellow' boys". One reviewer described the term as having "the inherent, unwieldy power to incite black Americans with such intense divisiveness and fervor" as few others.

In popular print media, Life published a full-page colour reproduction on page 34 of its 1 February 1937 issue of a 1934 painting by Reginald Marsh as part of an article entitled "Living Art at $5 Per Picture". Titled "High Yaller", the painting's subject is a light-skinned black woman dressed in bright yellow from head to foot walking down a Harlem street.

The phrase survives in folk songs such as "The Yellow Rose of Texas", which originally referred to Emily West Morgan, a "mulatto" indentured servant apocryphally associated with the Battle of San Jacinto. Blind Willie McTell's song "Lord, Send Me an Angel" has its protagonist forced to choose among three women, described as "Atlanta yellow", "Macon brown", and a "Statesboro blackskin". Bessie Smith's song "I've Got What It Takes", by Clarence Williams, refers to "a slick high yeller" boyfriend who "turned real pale" when she would not wait for him to get out of jail. Curtis Mayfield's song "We the People Who Are Darker Than Blue" makes reference to a "high yellow gal". In "Big Leg Blues", Mississippi John Hurt sings: "Some crave high yellow. I like black and brown."

In the 1982 Pulitzer Prize-winning novel The Color Purple by Alice Walker, a character called Mary Agnes "Squeak" sings a song lamenting the way her skin color leads her to be perceived within her community: "They calls me yellow / like yellow be my name..."

On the 1988 album Chalk Mark in a Rain Storm by Joni Mitchell, the song "Dancin' Clown" contains the lyrics "Down the street comes last word Susie, she's high yellow, looking top nice."

Digital Underground's 1991 album Sons of the P featured "No Nose Job", a song in which Shock G (as his alter-ego Humpty Hump) opines:

"They say the lighter the righter - Oh yeah?! Well'at's tough - Sometimes I feel that I'm not black enough - I'm high yellow, my nose is brown to perfection - And if I was to change it'd be further in that direction - So catch me on the beach, I'll be gettin' a tan - But yo there's no mistake that - Humpty-Hump is from the motherland."

On Ice Cube's album War & Peace Vol. 2 (The Peace Disc) released in 2000, the song "Hello" contains the lyrics "I'm looking for a big yellow in 6-inch stilettos."

In 2004, white R&B singer-songwriter Teena Marie released a song titled "High Yellow Girl", said to be about her daughter Alia Rose, who is biracial. The related phrase "high brown" was used in Irving Berlin's original lyrics for "Puttin' on the Ritz".

In 2009, Lil Wayne released a mixtape track from No Ceilings titled "I'm Good", and contains the lyrics "High yellow woman with her hair to her ass".

In 2010, Soulja Boy released "Pretty Boy Swag" which has the line "I'm lookin' for a yellow bone long haired star (star)".

In 2021, the Dominican-American R&B singer DaniLeigh sparked controversy by releasing a snippet of a song called "Yellow Bone". She later apologized following accusations of colorism.

== See also ==
- Baster
- Colorism
- Color terminology for race
- Hypodescent
- Light-skinned
- Louisiana Creole
- Indian South Africans
- Mixed-race
- Racial isolates in the United States
- One-drop rule
- Passing
- Quadroon
- Redbone
- Sambo
