= Albert Regis =

American football player (born 2003)

No. 98 – Jacksonville Jaguars
- Position: Defensive tackle
- Roster status: Active

Personal information
- Born: May 17, 2003 (age 23); La Porte, Texas, U.S.
- Listed height: 6 ft 1 in (1.85 m)
- Listed weight: 317 lb (144 kg)

Career information
- High school: La Porte
- College: Texas A&M (2021–2025)
- NFL draft: 2026: 3rd round, 81st overall pick

Career history
- Jacksonville Jaguars (2026–present)

Career NFL statistics as of Week 4, 2026
- Tackles: 2
- Stats at Pro Football Reference

Albert Regis (born May 17, 2003) is an American professional football defensive tackle for the Jacksonville Jaguars of the National Football League (NFL). He played college football for the Texas A&M Aggies and was selected by the Jaguars in the third round of the 2026 NFL draft.

== Early life ==
Regis attended La Porte High School. Coming out of high school, he was rated as a four star recruit, where he initially committed to play for the Minnesota Golden Gophers, over offers from other schools such as Texas, Texas Tech, Houston, Ole Miss, and Texas A&M. However, Regis later de-committed, and signed to play for the Texas A&M Aggies.

== College career ==
In his first collegiate season in 2021, Regis played in just one game, using the season to redshirt. In week three of the 2022 season, he made his first career start, where he knocked down a pass and blocked a field goal in an upset win over Miami. Regis finished the 2022 season, tallying 16 tackles with two and a half being for a loss, and a pass deflection. In the 2023 season, he totaled 15 tackles with three going for a loss, and a sack. During the 2024 season, Regis recorded 36 tackles with three being for a loss, half a sack, and six pass deflections. In week three of the 2025 season, he notched seven tackles with one going for a loss, and a sack, in a win over Notre Dame, where for his performance he was named the SEC defensive lineman of the week. In week eleven, Regis totaled four tackles in a victory over Missouri.

== Professional career ==
Pre-draft measurables
Height	Weight	Arm length	Hand span	Wingspan	40-yard dash	10-yard split	20-yard split	20-yard shuttle	Three-cone drill	Vertical jump	Broad jump	Bench press
6 ft 1 3/8 in (1.86 m)	295 lb (134 kg)	31 5/8 in (0.80 m)	9 5/8 in (0.24 m)	6 ft 5 1/8 in (1.96 m)	4.88 s	1.72 s	2.85 s	4.85 s	7.77 s	34.0 in (0.86 m)	9 ft 8 in (2.95 m)	27 reps
All values from NFL Combine/Pro Day

Regis was selected by the Jacksonville Jaguars in the third round with the 81st overall pick in the 2026 NFL draft.

== Personal life ==
Regis and his wife welcomed their first child, a daughter, on June 12, 2025. In April 2026, Regis' daughter crawled towards a set of cups with NFL team logos on them, selecting the Jacksonville Jaguars out of the lineup. Hours later, Regis was drafted by the Jaguars.
