= Houston Yacht Club =

Coordinates: 29.6178°N 95.0010°W

- Burgee
- Short name: HYC
- Founded: 1897
- Location: 3620 Miramar Drive, Shoreacres, TX 77571 United States
- Website: www.houstonyachtclub.com

The Houston Yacht Club is the oldest yacht club in Texas. In the Shoreacres area of the city of LaPorte, Texas, near Houston, it is a member of the Gulf Yachting Association.

== History ==
The HYC was founded in 1897. Originally called the Houston Yacht & Powerboat Club, its name was changed to Houston Yacht Club in 1927, when its current Spanish-style clubhouse was built, which has been declared an historic landmark in the Galveston Bay area of the Gulf Coast. The 27,000-square-foot (2,500 m^{2}) clubhouse has amenities for boating enthusiasts of all ages, including bar and restaurant facilities, lounges, a ballroom with stage, meeting rooms, shower rooms, and overnight guest rooms. The pink stucco structure is affectionately called the "Pink Palace" by members.

As well as local events, the HYC has hosted many national and international regattas on Galveston Bay. In 1929 and 1941, it hosted the Lipton Cup race. In 2015, it hosted the J22 North American Championship.

Many of the club's sailors have competed nationally and internationally, including Olympic sailors John Kolius and Charlie Ogletree.

== Location ==
It had been in the former city of Shoreacres since 1927. In 2001 it was the only business in the municipality. Therefore it was the only entity giving tax money to the city that was not a homeowner. This meant that an event that effected this business, such as Hurricane Ike in 2008, could significantly damage the municipality's tax base, and the hurricane did so. In 2026 Shoreacres disincorporated and became a part of La Porte, and therefore the Yacht Club went under La Porte jurisidiction.
