= Antoine Simpson =

American football player (born 1976)

No. 98, 93
- Position: Defensive tackle

Personal information
- Born: December 7, 1976 (age 49); Gary, Indiana, U.S.
- Listed height: 6 ft 2 in (1.88 m)
- Listed weight: 310 lb (141 kg)

Career information
- High school: La Porte (La Porte, Texas)
- College: Houston
- NFL draft: 1998: undrafted

Career history
- Miami Dolphins (1998–1999); San Diego Chargers (2000)

Career NFL statistics
- Tackles: 2
- Fumble recoveries: 1
- Stats at Pro Football Reference

Antoine Lagree Simpson (born December 7, 1976) is an American former professional football player who was a defensive tackle in the National Football League (NFL). He played college football for the Houston Cougars after transferring from Fort Scott Community College. An undrafted free agent, he played for the Miami Dolphins in 1999 and for the San Diego Chargers in 2000.
