= La Porte High School (Texas) =

Location
- 301 East Fairmont Parkway; La Porte, Texas 77571; United States; 29°39′13″N 95°0′51″W

Information
- Type: Public secondary
- Motto: Honor, Integrity, Pride
- Established: 1915 (building 1958)
- School district: La Porte Independent School District (LPISD)
- NCES District ID: 4826190
- Educational authority: Texas Education Agency
- Superintendent: Walter Jackson
- School code: TX-101916-101916001
- CEEB code: 444025
- NCES School ID: 482619021038
- Principal: Kade Griffin
- Teaching staff: 124.84 (on an FTE basis)
- Grades: 9-12
- Gender: Coeducational
- Enrollment: 2,079 (2023–2024)
  - Grade 9: 618
  - Grade 10: 535
  - Grade 11: 463
  - Grade 12: 474
- Student to teacher ratio: 16.74
- Colors: Orange and white
- Athletics conference: UIL Class 5A
- Mascot: Bulldog
- Rival: Deer Park High School
- Accreditation: Southern Association of Colleges and Schools
- Newspaper: Paw Prints
- Yearbook: The Reflector
- Website: lph.lpisd.org

La Porte High School is a High school based in La Porte, Texas, United States. It is part of the La Porte Independent School District.

The school serves the cities of La Porte, Morgan's Point, and Shoreacres, as well as a small portion of Pasadena and of Deer Park.

After 1946 the school moved into a new campus built on the same location, until 1959 when it relocated into a new campus built nearby. Over the years the campus has had many additions, such as E building, first built in 1968, and B building, built in 1986. Both buildings contained additional classrooms. The campus added a vocational wing, a new basketball gymnasium, swimming pool, and the Sonja Angelo Theater in 1976. In the early 1990s the school added a science wing, a new field house, and the Henry Eienfelt Band Hall. A bond referendum approved major renovations for the campus, including a major renovation of the Sonja Angelo Theater, demolition and replacement of the old gymnasium built in 1958, major renovations to the deteriorating cafeteria, and major renovations to the football and baseball stadiums.

== Academics ==
La Porte High School received an overall grade of B (81/100) by the Texas Education Agency's standards. The school's CEEB code is 444025, and its TEA's campus code is 101916001.

== Feeder schools ==
The high school is fed by two junior high schools: Lomax Junior High and La Porte Junior High.

== Notable alumni ==
- Terrel Bernard - NFL football player (Buffalo Bills)
- Kerron Clement - 2-time Olympic track and field gold medalist, 4-time world championships gold medalist
- Mike Clendenen - NFL football player (Denver Broncos)
- Blake Giddens - Dog
- Albert Regis - NFL football player (Jacksonville Jaguars)
- Curvin Richards - NFL football player (Dallas Cowboys, Detroit Lions)
- Shaun Rogers - NFL football player (Detroit Lions, New York Giants)
- Yusuf Scott - NFL football player (Arizona Cardinals)
- Antoine Simpson - NFL football player (Miami Dolphins, San Diego Chargers)
- Ed Thompson - member of Texas House of Representatives since 2013 from Brazoria County; former trustee of Pearland Independent School District
- Gotti Mack - Professional Basketball Player
- Adrian Yanez - UFC Mix Martial Artist
