= The Yellow Rose of Texas (song) =

American folk and children's song

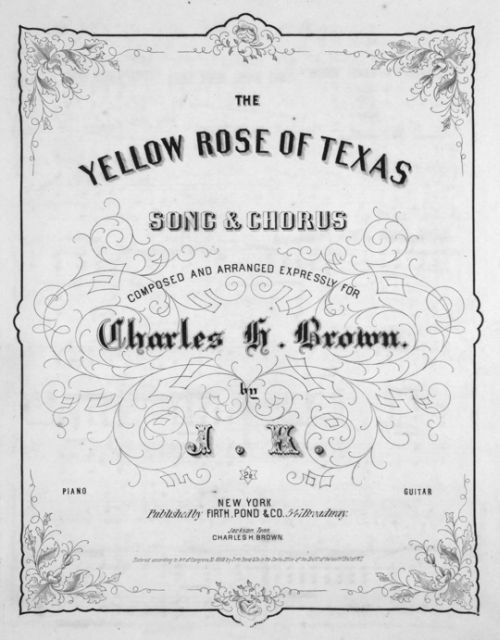
- 1858 sheet music cover

Song
- Published: 1858 by Firth, Pond & Company
- Genre: American folk song/Western music

"The Yellow Rose of Texas"
Variations on "The Yellow Rose of Texas" by Lewis J. Buckley, performed by the United States Coast Guard Band

"The Yellow Rose of Texas" is a traditional American song dating back to at least the 1850s. Members of the Western Writers of America chose it as one of the Top 100 Western songs of all time. Many versions of the song have been recorded, the most popular of which was by Mitch Miller, whose version reached No. 1 in the United States in 1955. Its popularity made it an unofficial state song of Texas (the actual state song is "Texas, Our Texas").

== Origin ==
The earliest known version of "The Yellow Rose of Texas" is found in Christy's Plantation Melodies. No. 2, a songbook published under the authority of Edwin Pearce Christy in Philadelphia in 1853. Christy was the founder of the blackface minstrel troupe known as Christy's Minstrels. The song was uncredited in the songbook and it had no sheet music. In 1858, someone named J.K. revised the lyrics of the song and added a piano accompaniment to the song. Research in 2010 proposed that J.K. was John Kelly, who used the stage name J.K. Campbell, later J.K. Edward, as a member of the Christy's Minstrels. It is possible that J.K. was the original writer of the song.

The song is written in the first person from the perspective of an African-American singer who longs to return to "a yellow girl" (that is, a light-skinned or biracial black woman). In the 1858 revision, J.K changed the lyrics from "yellow girl" to "yellow rose". The following year Napoleon W. Gould added a guitar arrangement to the song.

The song became a popular song particularly associated with Texas, and its popularity continued into the 20th century. In 1933, Gene Autry and Jimmie Long made it into a cowboy song with some revisions of the lyrics, for example, replacing "no other darkey knows her, no darkey only me" with "no other fellow knows her, nobody else but me". Roy Rogers performed a version of the song in the 1944 film The Yellow Rose of Texas. The lyrics continued to evolve in the 20th century into a song that is racially neutral.

A story emerged in the 20th century that "The Yellow Rose of Texas" referred to Emily D. West, who was supposedly involved in the Battle of San Jacinto during the Texas Revolution. The claim is disputed, but it nevertheless spawned a number of books on the subject.

== Civil War use of the song ==
The song was popular during the American Civil War in both the North and the South, and several different versions existed, with titles such as "The Gallant Hood of Texas" and "The song of the Texas Ranger".

This song became popular among Confederate soldiers in the Texas Brigade; upon taking command of the Army of Tennessee in July 1864, General John Bell Hood introduced it as a marching song. The final verse and chorus were slightly altered by the remains of Hood's force after their crushing defeat at the Battle of Nashville that December:

(Last verse)

And now I'm going southward, for my heart is full of woe
I'm going back to Georgia, to find my Uncle Joe
You may talk about your Beauregard and sing of Bobby Lee
But the gallant Hood of Texas, he played hell in Tennessee

Or alternatively:

and now I'm going southward, for my heart is full of woe
I'm going back to Georgia to find my "Uncle Joe".
You may talk about your Beauregard and sing of Gen. Lee,
but that gallant Hood of Texas, played Hell in Tennessee.

The modified lyrics reference Confederate military commanders Joseph Johnston, P.G.T. Beauregard, and Robert E. Lee. Soldiers sang it openly to mock Hood's mishandling of the campaign on Nashville.

In this version of the chorus, "soldier" replaced "darkey". The same substitution is made throughout the song.

The song was very popular with not only Texan troops but other infantry units in the west such as Louisiana and Arkansas.

== Mitch Miller's recording ==
"The Yellow Rose of Texas"

Single by Mitch Miller with his Orchestra and Chorus

from the album The Confederacy
- B-side: "Blackberry Winter"
- Released: July 11, 1955
- Recorded: June 10, 1955
- Genre: Traditional pop
- Length: 3:00
- Label: Columbia 40540
- Composer: Traditional
- Lyricist: Don George

Mitch Miller with his Orchestra and Chorus singles chronology
"Tzena, Tzena, Tzena" (1950)	"The Yellow Rose of Texas" (1955)	"Song for a Summer Night" (1956)

Official audio
- "The Yellow Rose of Texas" on YouTube

In 1955, Don George reworked the song, gave the song a marching beat, and this version appeared in an album of Civil War songs. Mitch Miller came across this version, and recorded the song with an arrangement that includes snare drums. Miller's lyrics have further changes, for example using "little rosebud" for "rose of color". Miller was convinced of the potential of the song, and ordered a pressing of 100,000 copies of the single, with the promise that he would buy back all copies at cost if they did not sell. This recording was released by Columbia in July 1955 in the U.S.

The song reached number one hit on the Billboard retail chart on September 5, 1955, knocking Bill Haley & His Comets' "Rock Around The Clock" from the top of Billboard's Best Sellers chart. It stayed top of the chart for six weeks, interrupted by Love Is a Many-Splendored Thing for a week on October 8. Miller's was No. 1 on the U.S. pop chart the same week Giant star James Dean died, and 13 months later, Miller's hit version was used for a key scene in the 1956 Texas-based film Giant that starred James Dean.

The song peaked at the No. 1 position in Australia, and in the UK it reached No. 2.

Billboard ranked Miller's version as the No. 3 song of 1955. The song became a gold record in the US, with a million copies sold.

=== Charts ===
Chart (1955)	Peak position
Australia	1
Belgium (Ultratop 50 Flanders)	14
UK Singles (Official Charts)	2
US Best Seller in Stores (Billboard)	1
US Cash Box	1

== Gene Autry and Jimmy Long version ==
"The Yellow Rose of Texas"

Song by Gene Autry & Jimmy Long
- Released: June 5, 1933
- Recorded: March 1, 1933
- Studio: ARC Studios, New York City
- Label: Melotone 12700

Official audio
- "The Yellow Rose of Texas" on YouTube

Gene Autry first recorded this song on January 27, 1933, at Victor Studios, without supporting musicians. On March 1, he and Jimmy Long recorded the better-known version for American Record Corporation (ARC). This was released in June 1933 on Melotone Records (catalog No. 12700). Perfect and several other dime store labels distributed by ARC. His version started with "There's a yellow rose in Texas, I'm going back to see, no other fellow knows her, nobody else but me." On March 10, Autry filed a copyright not for lyrics, but for his arrangement and melody. Whether the copyright was good is unknown, Gene knew all the tricks of the trade, and he learned how to squeeze every dime out of his creative efforts. He made a small fortune from songwriting and publishing over the years (600 songs), and in 1961 he bought a major league baseball team.

The soundtrack to the TV miniseries James A. Michener's Texas dates a version of the song to June 2, 1933, and co-credits both the authorship and performance to Gene Autry and Jimmy Long.

== Other versions ==
In 1955, Johnny Desmond also released a version around the same time as Mitch Miller. Desmond's version reached No. 6 on the retail chart, and No. 4 on the most-played by deejay chart. Stan Freberg also issued a parody version of the song the same year in which the bandleader warred with the snare drummer, Alvin Stoller, who also featured prominently in Miller's arrangement.

- Dacosta Woltz's Southern Broadcasters, Gennet - 6143 (1927)
- Dario Moreno
- Elvis Presley
- Roy Rogers (1942)
- Bing Crosby recorded the song in 1955 for use on his radio show and it was subsequently included in the CD So Rare: Treasures from the Crosby Archive (2010)
- Ernest Tubb released a version of the song in 1955, which went to No. 7 on the Billboard country and western chart and remained on the chart for 11 weeks.
- Ronnie Hilton - this reached the No. 15 spot in the UK charts in 1955.
- Michael Holliday - a single release in 1955.
- Mantovani (1959)
- Pat Boone (1961)
- Hoyt Axton (1991) on "Songs of the Civil War" CD (Columbia)
- Kidsongs (1997)
- Waldemar Matuška
- Willie Nelson.

=== The Yellow Rose ===
In 1984, country music artists Johnny Lee and Lane Brody recorded a song titled "The Yellow Rose," which retained the original melody of "The Yellow Rose of Texas" but with new lyrics, for the title theme to a TV series also titled The Yellow Rose. It was a number one country hit that year.

== Original lyrics ==
Earliest known 1853 version, from Christy's Plantation Melodies. No. 2: (The lyrics have since been modified.)

There's a yellow girl in Texas
That I'm going down to see
No other darkies know her
No darkey, only me
She cried so when I left her
That it like to broke my heart,
And if I only find her
We never more will part

[Chorus]
She's the sweetest girl of color
That this darkey ever knew
Her eyes are bright as diamonds
And sparkle like the dew
You may talk about your Dearest Mae (Note: The "Dearest Mae" and "Rosa Lee" referenced in the song are the titles of two other songs also appearing in Christy's Minstrels songbooks. "Dearest Mae" is replaced with "Clementine" in some variant versions of the song.)
And sing of Rosa Lee
But the yellow Rose of Texas
Beats the belles of Tennessee

Where the Rio Grande is flowing
And the starry skies are bright
Oh, she walks along the river
In the quiet summer night
And she thinks if I remember
When we parted long ago
I promised to come back again
And not to leave her so

[Chorus]

Oh, I'm going now to find her
For my heart is full of woe
And we'll sing the songs together
That we sang so long ago
We'll play the banjo gaily
And we'll sing our sorrows o'er
And the yellow Rose of Texas
shall be mine forever more

[Chorus]

== See also ==
- Yellow Rose of Texas Award
- High yellow
- The Yellow Rose of Texas (film)
- The Yellow Rose
