= Terrel Bernard =

American football player (born 1999)

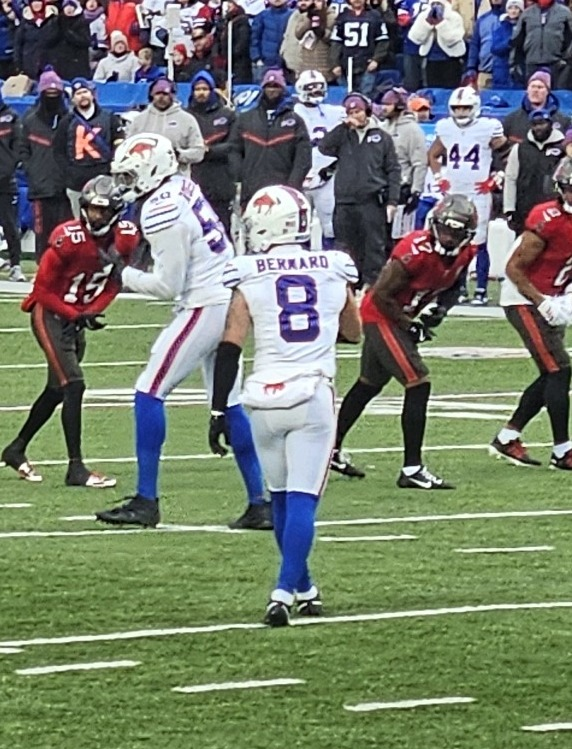
- Bernard (#8) with the Buffalo Bills in 2025

No. 8 – Buffalo Bills
- Position: Linebacker
- Roster status: Active

Personal information
- Born: May 7, 1999 (age 27); La Porte, Texas, U.S.
- Listed height: 6 ft 1 in (1.85 m)
- Listed weight: 224 lb (102 kg)

Career information
- High school: La Porte
- College: Baylor (2017–2021)
- NFL draft: 2022: 3rd round, 89th overall pick

Career history
- Buffalo Bills (2022–present)

Awards and highlights
- First-team All-Big 12 (2021); 2× Second-team All-Big 12 (2019, 2020)

Career NFL statistics as of Week 11, 2026
- Total tackles: 401
- Sacks: 7.5
- Fumble recoveries: 7
- Pass deflections: 14
- Interceptions: 7
- Stats at Pro Football Reference

Terrel Bernard (born May 7, 1999) is an American professional football linebacker for the Buffalo Bills of the National Football League (NFL). He played college football for the Baylor Bears.

== Early life ==
Bernard grew up in La Porte, Texas and attended La Porte High School.

== College career ==
Bernard redshirted his true freshman season at Baylor. He played in 11 games as a redshirt freshman and recorded 47 tackles with one sack and one interception. Bernard became a starter as a redshirt sophomore and was named second team All-Big 12 Conference after leading the Bears with 112 tackles and also recording 4.5 sacks, three fumble recoveries, and one interception. He repeated as a second team All-Big 12 selection in 2020 after recording 55 tackles through five games before suffering a season ending injury. Bernard was named first team All-Conference as a redshirt senior after recording 106 tackles with 12.5 for loss and 7.5 sacks. He was named the 2022 Sugar Bowl MVP after posting 20 tackles and 2 sacks vs. Ole Miss.

== Professional career ==
Pre-draft measurables
Height	Weight	Arm length	Hand span	Wingspan	40-yard dash	10-yard split	20-yard split	20-yard shuttle	Three-cone drill	Vertical jump	Broad jump	Bench press
6 ft 0 7/8 in (1.85 m)	224 lb (102 kg)	30 1/4 in (0.77 m)	9 5/8 in (0.24 m)	6 ft 1 in (1.85 m)	4.59 s	1.57 s	2.63 s	4.25 s	7.03 s	35.5 in (0.90 m)	10 ft 3 in (3.12 m)	22 reps
All values from NFL Combine/Pro Day

The Buffalo Bills selected Bernard in the third round, 89th overall, of the 2022 NFL draft. He played mostly as a backup in his rookie year.

=== 2023 season ===
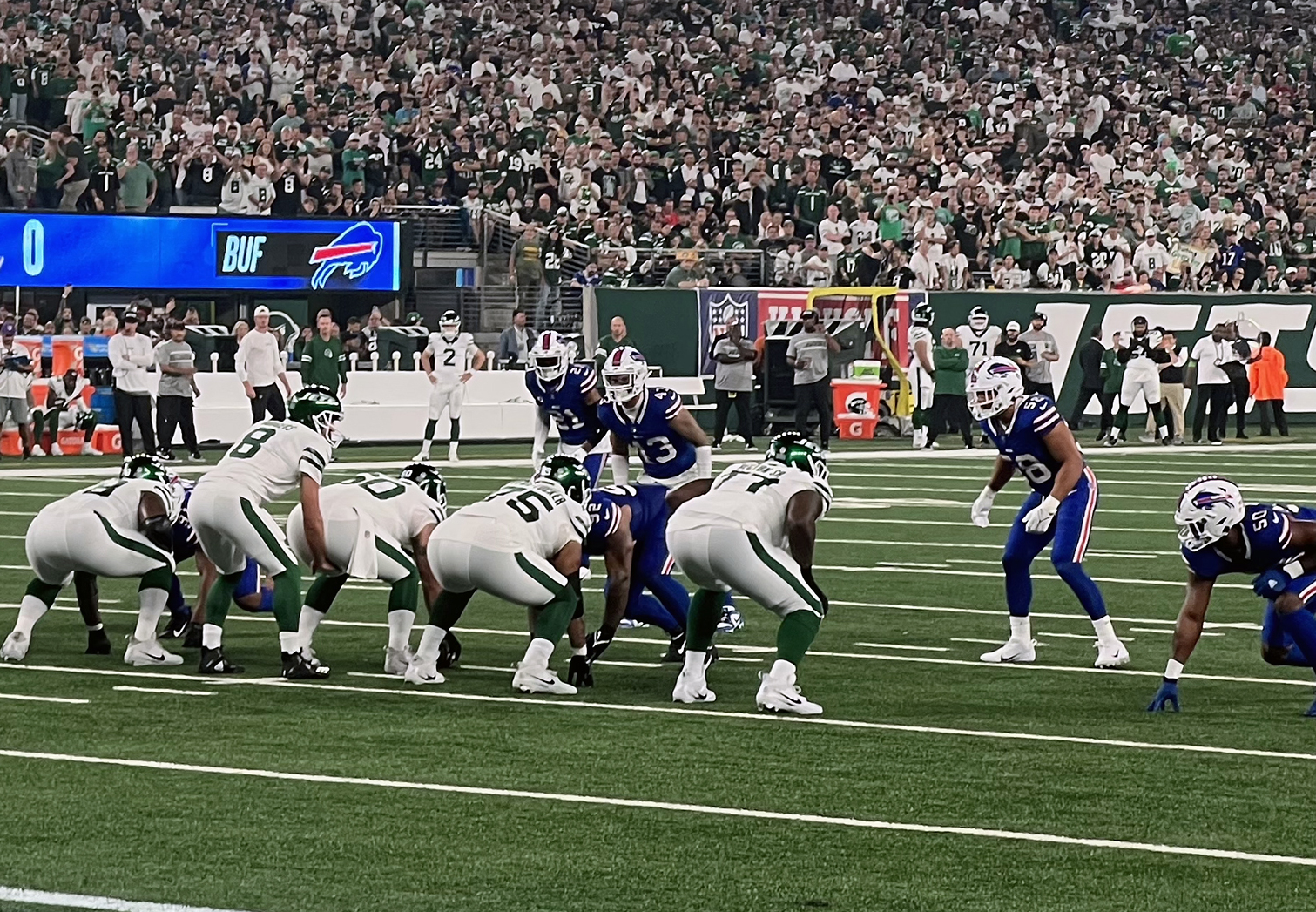
Bernard (#43) in action with his teammates against Aaron Rodgers and the New York Jets in 2023

Despite missing much of 2023 preseason due to an injury, Bernard was named the starting inside linebacker to replace Tremaine Edmunds prior to the season. In Week 3 of the 2023 season, Bernard recorded seven tackles, two sacks, a fumble recovery and an interception in a 37–3 win over the Washington Commanders, earning AFC Defensive Player of the Week. In his first season as starter, Bernard played all 17 regular season games, leading the Bills in tackles while also becoming the first linebacker in the league since 1991 to put up at least six sacks, three interceptions and three fumble recoveries in the same season. Head coach Sean McDermott later named Bernard his breakout player on the team after the season.

In the playoffs, Bernard injured his ankle in the wild card round against the Pittsburgh Steelers and was carted off the field. While Buffalo would advance to the divisional round against the eventual Super Bowl champion Kansas City Chiefs, Bernard was ruled out due to the injury, and Buffalo lost 27–24 without him and several other defensive starters on the field.

=== 2024 season ===
Bernard was named one of just two team captains for the Bills the following year along with quarterback Josh Allen, with Bernard representing the defense. He suffered a strained pectoral muscle in Buffalo's week 2 win over the Miami Dolphins, missing the next two games. In his return against the Houston Texans, Bernard made two key defensive plays, stuffing a fourth-down attempt by Houston in the second quarter and intercepting a pass intended by C. J. Stroud for former Bills receiver Stefon Diggs in the fourth quarter, but Buffalo still lost by a last-second field goal 23–20. In week 11 against the Kansas City Chiefs, Bernard made a game-winning interception against Patrick Mahomes, ending Kansas City’s hopes of an undefeated season.

=== 2025 season ===
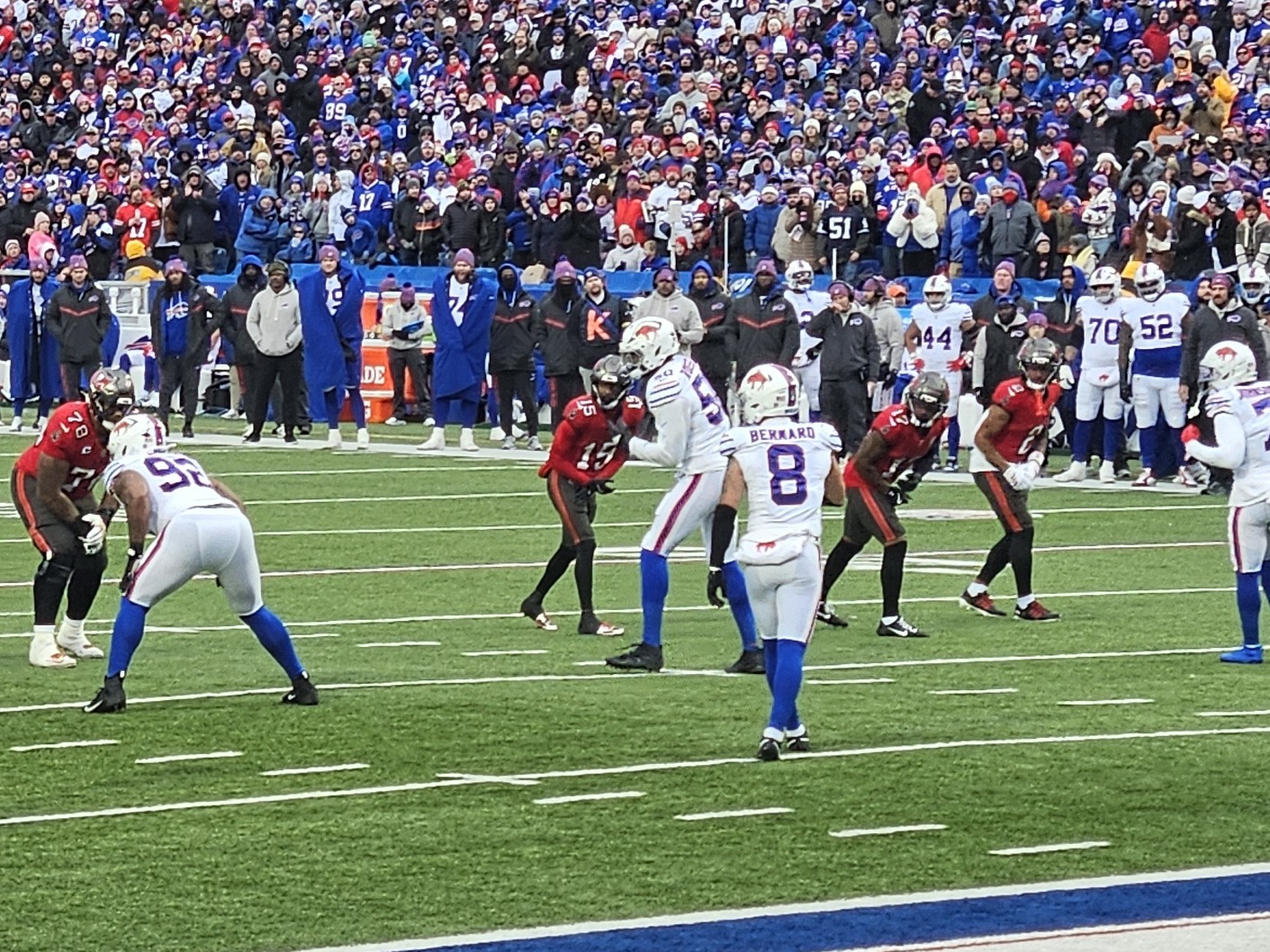
Bernard and his teammates against the Tampa Bay Buccaneers in 2025

On March 7, 2025, Bernard signed a four-year, $50 million contract extension with the Bills. He was the team's second-leading tackler up until injuring his elbow against the Houston Texans, in which he collided with teammate Matt Milano. Bernard missed several games afterwards.

== NFL career statistics ==
Legend
**Bold**	Career high

=== Regular season ===
Year	Team	Games		Tackles							Interceptions						Fumbles				
Year	Team	GP	GS	Cmb	Solo	Ast	TFL	QBH	Sck	Sfty	PD	Int	Yds	Avg	Lng	TD	FF	FR	Yds	Avg	TD
2022	BUF	16	1	22	11	11	0	0	0.0	0	0	0	0	—	0	0	0	0	0	—	0
2023	BUF	17	17	**143**	**84**	**59**	**10**	**9**	**6.5**	0	**5**	**3**	2	0.7	2	0	0	**3**	-1	-0.3	0
2024	BUF	13	13	104	55	49	5	3	1.0	0	3	2	1	0.5	1	0	0	1	0	0.0	0
2025	BUF	12	11	65	44	21	7	2	0.0	0	3	1	**24**	**24.0**	**24**	0	0	2	0	0.0	0
2026	BUF	10	10	67	33	34	3	3	0.0	0	3	1	5	5.0	5	0	0	1	0	0.0	0
Career		68	52	401	227	174	25	17	7.5	0	14	7	32	4.6	24	0	0	7	-1	-0.3	0

=== Postseason ===
Year	Team	Games		Tackles							Interceptions						Fumbles				
Year	Team	GP	GS	Cmb	Solo	Ast	TFL	QBH	Sck	Sfty	PD	Int	Yds	Avg	Lng	TD	FF	FR	Yds	Avg	TD
2022	BUF	1	0	1	0	1	0	0	0.0	0	0	0	0	0	0	0	0	0	0	0	0
2023	BUF	1	1	4	3	1	0	0	0.0	0	**2**	0	0	0	0	0	0	**1**	0	0	0
2024	BUF	3	3	**16**	**10**	**6**	**1**	0	0.0	0	0	0	0	0	0	0	**1**	**1**	0	0	0
2025	BUF	Did not play due to injury																			
Career		5	4	21	13	8	1	0	0.0	0	2	0	0	0	0	0	1	2	0	0	0

== Personal life ==
Bernard is engaged to Tayler Bernard. She holds a doctorate in physical therapy from Baylor. Their daughter, Jordy, was born in May 2025.
