= Curvin Richards =

American football player (born 1968)

No. 27, 28
- Position: Running back

Personal information
- Born: December 26, 1968 (age 57); Port of Spain, Trinidad and Tobago
- Listed height: 5 ft 9 in (1.75 m)
- Listed weight: 200 lb (91 kg)

Career information
- High school: La Porte (La Porte, Texas, U.S.)
- College: Pittsburgh
- NFL draft: 1991: 4th round, 97th overall pick

Career history
- Dallas Cowboys (1991–1992); Detroit Lions (1993); Sacramento Gold Miners (1994)

Awards and highlights
- First-team All-East (1988); Second-team All-East (1989)

Career NFL statistics
- Rushing yards: 181
- Rushing average: 3.3
- Touchdowns: 1
- Stats at Pro Football Reference

Curvin Stephen Richards (born December 26, 1968) is a former professional American football running back who played for three seasons in the National Football League (NFL). He played college football for the Pittsburgh Panthers. He spent two seasons with the Dallas Cowboys (1991–1992) and one season with the Detroit Lions in 1993.

== Early life ==
Richards was born in Trinidad and Tobago, before his family moved to La Porte, Texas, when he was 10 years old. He attended LaPorte High School where he became a starter as a sophomore and produced 1,577 rushing yards.

The next year, he finished with 1,106 rushing yards. As a senior a new wishbone offense was implemented, which in turn impacted his carries and production (811 rushing yards).

He also played center field in baseball, hitting for a .429 average as a senior.

== College career ==
Richards accepted a football scholarship form the University of Pittsburgh. He was a third-team running back when his freshman season started. After Adam Walker was injured in the first quarter of the fourth game of the season against Boston College, Richards replaced him and rushed for 202 yards. Not only did he keep the starting job but also became a media sensation, earning the nickname "Swervin" and being compared to Tony Dorsett and Herschel Walker. He finished the season as the Division I-A leading freshman rusher (1,228 rushing yards) and the second freshman in school history to have a 1,000 yard season (after Dorsett). He also had 3 games where he rushed for over 200 yards.

The next year, he registered 1,282 rushing yards, becoming only second player in school history to achieve multiple and back-to-back 1,000 yards rushing seasons (after Dorsett). He rushed for a career-high 264 yards against East Carolina University, at the time the fourth best single-game mark in school history.

As a junior, he began the year with three straight 100-yard rushing games, before suffering an ankle injury when a lineman fell on his leg during a practice. He lost three games due to this severe sprained ankle and started only three of the last five games of the season, which made his statistics drop to 682 rushing yards and 2 touchdowns.

The following season, he was suspended indefinitely by new head coach Paul Hackett for missing team meetings and study hall time. News later surfaced that even though he didn't inform the team, he left to be with his sister who was in a coma with a brain tumor and eventually died. This situation made him decide to declare as an early entry into the NFL draft.

Even though he only played for three years, he left as the school's second career rusher with 3,192 yards (behind Dorsett).

== Professional career ==
=== Dallas Cowboys ===
Richards was selected by the Dallas Cowboys in the fourth round (97th overall) of the 1991 NFL draft, after he dropped because of a poor junior year. He was the team's second leading rusher in the preseason and had the Cowboys longest run (a 32-yarder). He made the team as the backup to future Hall of Fame running back Emmitt Smith, but was placed on the injured reserve list after the second game of the season.

During the last game of the 1992 regular season, when the Cowboys were playing the Chicago Bears, the team rested most of its regular players in the fourth quarter (including Smith), to prepare for the upcoming playoffs. Richards saw extensive playing time and scored a touchdown, but also committed two costly fumbles in a 27-14 win. The next day, Cowboys coach Jimmy Johnson released him, citing the fact that he could not tolerate a running back with a fumbling problem going into the playoffs, even though he would not be able to replace his roster spot by signing a new player, that he would have to pay him in full for all of the remaining games and eventually would have to give him a Super Bowl ring. Thus, Richards missed the entire 1992 postseason, including the Cowboys' 52-17 win over the Buffalo Bills in Super Bowl XXVII.

=== Detroit Lions ===
In 1993, he signed as a free agent with the Detroit Lions. He was released on August 30 and recalled off waivers the next day. He was cut on September 7, after playing in one game.

=== Sacramento Gold Miners ===
On May 19, 1994, he signed with the Sacramento Gold Miners of the Canadian Football League.
