= Dacosta Woltz's Southern Broadcasters =

DaCosta Woltz was an American old time banjo player from Galax, Virginia. His band, DaCosta Woltz's Southern Broadcasters played Appalachian old-time string band and square dance music and recorded in the late 1920s. Ben Jarrell, of Surry County, North Carolina, and father of influential fiddle and banjo musician Tommy Jarrell, played with the Southern Broadcasters. DaCosta Woltz was a promoter of patent medicine, the mayor of Galax, and a first-rate banjo player. The band made a dozen or so commercial recordings in May 1927.
