= List of songs recorded by Patsy Cline =

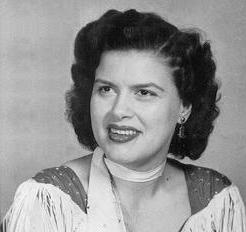
Patsy Cline promotional photograph, taken in 1957.

Patsy Cline (1932–1963) was an American country singer who recorded about 100 songs during her career from 1955 through 1963. Cline has often been called one of the most influential vocalists, mostly due to the vocal delivery of her material. Considered among the best examples of her vocal delivery are the songs "Walkin' After Midnight", "I Fall to Pieces", and "Crazy". These singles were also among Cline's biggest hits, all of which reached major positions on the Billboard country and pop music charts.

During her eight-year career, Cline recorded a total of 104 songs. This consisted of tracks recorded with her first label, 4 Star Records, and tracks recorded with her second label, Decca. Her early recordings with 4 Star began in 1955 and were a mixture of traditional country, traditional pop, rock and gospel. This period included "Walkin' After Midnight", which has been considered among her higher-quality material for the label. Other notable recordings from this era included "Three Cigarettes (In an Ashtray)", "I Can See an Angel" and "Gotta a Lotta Rhythm in My Soul".

Signing with Decca Records in 1960 allowed Cline more collaborative opportunities with producer Owen Bradley. Bradley would be responsible for framing her Nashville Sound musical style that would continue until her 1963 death. In her first Decca sessions, Cline recorded "I Fall to Pieces". During her time with Decca, she also covered a variety of material that featured material from the Great American Songbook as well as standards from country music. Among these recordings was "Always", "True Love" and "Your Cheatin' Heart. At the time of Cline's death, she had recorded music that was planned for an anticipated fourth studio album. This music (among other previously-unreleased material) would later be issued in numerous compilation albums and boxed sets.

== Recorded songs ==
List of songs with title, songwriter(s), original album release, year of recording, and reference(s)
Original title	Writer(s)	Original album release	Year	Ref(s)
"Ain't No Wheels on This Ship (We Can't Roll)"	Waylon Chandler; W.S. Stevenson	Patsy Cline	1957	
"Always"	Irving Berlin	A Portrait of Patsy Cline	1963	
"Anytime"	Herbert "Happy" Lawson	Sentimentally Yours	1962	
"Back in Baby's Arms"	Bob Montgomery; Allen Toussaint	The Patsy Cline Story	1962	
"Bill Bailey, Won't You Please Come Home"	Hughie Cannon	That's How a Heartache Begins	1963	
"Blue Moon of Kentucky"	Bill Monroe	A Portrait of Patsy Cline	1963	
"A Church, a Courtroom, Then Goodbye"	Eddie Miller; Stevenson	Songs by Patsy Cline	1955	
"Come on In (And Make Yourself at Home)"	Virgil F. Stewart	Did not originally appear on a major-label album	1955	
"Come on In (And Make Yourself at Home)"	Stewart	Did not originally appear on a major-label album	1958	
"Crazy"	Willie Nelson	Showcase	1961	
"Crazy Arms"	Ralph Mooney; Chuck Seals	A Portrait of Patsy Cline	1963	
"Crazy Dreams"	Charles Beam; Charles L. Jiles; Stevenson	Did not originally appear on a major-label album	1960	
"Cry Not for Me"	Donn Hecht; Jack Moon	Did not originally appear on a major-label album	1957	
"Dear God"	Virgil F. Stewart	Did not originally appear on a major-label album	1956	
"Does Your Heart Beat for Me"	Arnold Johnson; Russ Morgan; Mitchell Parish	A Portrait of Patsy Cline	1963	
"Don't Ever Leave Me Again"	Lillian Claiborne; Virginia Hensley; James Crawford	Patsy Cline	1957	
"Faded Love"	Bob Wills; Billy Jack Wills; John Wills	A Portrait of Patsy Cline	1963	
"Fingerprints"	Donn Hecht; Woodie Fleener; W.S. Stevenson	Patsy Cline	1957	
"Foolin' Around"	Harlan Howard; Buck Owens	Showcase	1961	
"Gotta Lot of Rhythm in My Soul"	Stevenson; Barbara Vaughn	Did not originally appear on a major-label album	1959	
"Half as Much"	Curley Williams	Sentimentally Yours	1962	
"Have You Ever Been Lonely (Have You Ever Been Blue)"	Peter DeRose; George Brown	Showcase	1961	
"He Called Me Baby"	Howard	That's How a Heartache Begins	1963	
"He Will Do for You"	Stewart; Chas Hitt	Did not originally appear on a major-label album	1956	
"The Heart You Break May Be Your Own"	Tiny Colbert; Bob Geesling	Did not originally appear on a major-label album	1956	
"Heartaches"	Al Hoffman; John Klenner	Sentimentally Yours	1961	
"Hidin' Out"	Miller; Stevenson	Songs by Patsy Cline	1955	
"Honky Tonk Merry-Go-Round"	Stan Gardner; Frank Simon	Songs by Patsy Cline	1955	
"How Can I Face Tomorrow"	Clyde Beam; Charles Jiles; W.S. Stevenson	Did not originally appear on a major-label album	1960	
"Hungry for Love"	Miller; Stevenson	Patsy Cline	1957	
"I Can See an Angel"	Kay Adelman	Did not originally appear on a major-label album	1958	
"I Can't Forget You"	Carl Belew; Stevenson	Patsy Cline	1957	
"I Can't Help It (If I'm Still in Love with You)"	Hank Williams	Sentimentally Yours	1962	
"I Cried All the Way to the Altar"	Bobby Flournoy; Stevenson	Did not originally appear on a major-label album	1955	
"I Don't Wanta"	Durwood Haddock; Miller; Stevenson	Did not originally appear on a major-label album	1955	
"I Don't Wanta"	Haddock; Miller; Stevenson	Patsy Cline	1957	
"I Fall to Pieces"	Hank Cochran; Howard	Showcase	1960	
"I Love You, Honey"	Miller; Stevenson	Did not originally appear on a major-label album	1955	
"I Love You So Much It Hurts"	Floyd Tillman	Showcase	1961	
"I'll Sail My Ship Alone"	Morry Burns; Henry Bernard; Lois Mann; Henry Thurston	A Portrait of Patsy Cline	1963	
"I'm Blue Again"	Beam; Jiles; Stevenson	Did not originally appear on a major-label album	1959	
"I'm Moving Along"	Johnny Starr	That's How a Heartache Begins	1959	
"I've Loved and Lost Again"	Miller	Did not originally appear on a major-label album	1956	
"If I Could Only Stay Asleep"	Ethel Bassey; Chandler	Did not originally appear on a major-label album	1958	
"If I Could See the World (Through the Eyes of a Child)"	Sammy Masters; Richard Pope; Tex Satterwhite	Did not originally appear on a major-label album	1957	
"Imagine That"	Justin Tubb	The Patsy Cline Story	1962	
"In Care of the Blues"	Miller; Stevenson	Patsy Cline	1957	
"Just a Closer Walk with Thee"	Traditional	Did not originally appear on a major-label album	1959	
"Just Out of Reach'	Stewart	Did not originally appear on a major-label album	1958	
"Leavin' on Your Mind"	Webb Pierce; Wayne Walker	The Patsy Cline Story	1962	
"Let the Teardrops Fall"	Beam; Jiles; Stevenson	Did not originally appear on a major-label album	1958	
"Life's Railway to Heaven"	Charlie Tillman	Did not originally appear on a major-label album	1959	
"Lonely Street"	Belew; Kenny Sowder; Stevenson	Sentimentally Yours	1962	
"Love Letters in the Sand"	J. Fred Coots; Nick Kenny; Charles Kenny	That's How a Heartache Begins	1963	
"Love, Love, Love, Love Me Honey Do"	Beam; Jiles; Stevenson	That's How a Heartache Begins	1959	
"Lovesick Blues"	Cliff Friend; Irving Mills	Patsy Cline	1960	
"Lovin' in Vain"	Freddie Hart	Patsy Cline	1960	
"Never No More"	Alan Block; Hecht; Rita Ross	Did not originally appear on a major-label album	1958	
"Pick Me Up (On Your Way Down)"	Mae Axton; Burton Levy; Glenn Reeves	Did not originally appear on a major-label album	1956	
"A Poor Man's Roses (Or a Rich Man's Gold)"	Bob Hilliard; Milton DeLugg	Did not originally appear on a major-label album	1956	
"A Poor Man's Roses (Or a Rich Man's Gold)"	Hilliard; DeLugg	Showcase	1961	
"San Antonio Rose"	Wills	Showcase	1961	
"Seven Lonely Days"	Earl Shuman; Alden Shuman; Marshall Brown	Showcase	1961	
"She's Got You"	Cochran	Sentimentally Yours	1961	
"Shoes"	Cochran; Thelma Smith	That's How a Heartache Begins	1960	
"So Wrong"	Danny Dill; Carl Perkins; Mel Tillis	So Wrong/You're Stronger Than Me	1962	
"Someday (You'll Want Me to Want You)"	Jimmy Hodges; Hugh Starr	A Portrait of Patsy Cline	1963	
"South of the Border (Down Mexico Way)"	Michael Carr; Jimmy Kennedy	Showcase	1961	
"Stop, Look and Listen"	George London; Stevenson	Did not originally appear on a major-label album	1956	
"Stop the World (And Let Me Off)"	Belew; Stevenson	Did not originally appear on a major-label album	1957	
"Strange"	Fred Burch; Tillis	Sentimentally Yours	1961	
"A Stranger in My Arms"	Hensley; Marylu Jeans; Charlotte White	Did not originally appear on a major-label album	1957	
"Sweet Dreams (Of You)"	Don Gibson	The Patsy Cline Story	1963	
"That Wonderful Someone"	Gertrude Burg	Patsy Cline	1957	
"That's My Desire"	Helmy Kresa; Carroll Loveday	Sentimentally Yours	1962	
"Then You'll Know"	Bobby Lile	Patsy Cline	1957	
"There He Goes"	Haddock; Miller; Stevenson	Did not originally appear on a major-label album	1960	
"Three Cigarettes in an Ashtray"	Miller; Stevenson	Patsy Cline	1957	
"Today, Tomorrow and Forever"	Colbert; Geesling	Did not originally appear on a major-label album	1957	
"Too Many Secrets"	Lile	Patsy Cline	1957	
"Tra Le La La Triangle"	Burch; Marijohn Wilkin	The Patsy Cline Story	1962	
"True Love"	Cole Porter	Showcase	1961	
"Try Again"	Bob Summers; Lefors	Did not originally appear on a major-label album	1957	
"Turn the Cards Slowly"	Masters	Songs by Patsy Cline	1955	
"Walkin' After Midnight"	Block; Hecht	Patsy Cline	1956	
"Walkin' After Midnight"	Block; Hecht	Showcase	1961	
"Walkin' Dream'	Hal Willis; Ginger Willis	Did not originally appear on a major-label album	1957	
"The Wayward Wind"	Stanley Lebowsky; Herb Newman	Showcase	1961	
"When I Get Through with You (You'll Love Me Too)"	Howard	A Portrait of Patsy Cline	1962	
"When You Need a Laugh"	Cochran	A Portrait of Patsy Cline	1962	
"Who Can I Count On"	Masters	A Portrait of Patsy Cline	1961	
"Why Can't He Be You"	Cochran	The Patsy Cline Story	1962	
"Yes I Understand"	Beam; Jiles; Stevenson	Did not originally appear on a major-label album	1959	
"You Belong to Me"	Pee Wee King; Chilton Price; Redd Stewart	Sentimentally Yours	1962	
"You Made Me Love You (I Didn't Want to Do It)"	Joseph McCarthy; James V. Monaco	Sentimentally Yours	1962	
"You Took Him Off My Hands"	Howard; Skeets McDonald; Wynn Stewart	A Portrait of Patsy Cline	1963	
"You Were Only Fooling (While I Was Falling in Love"	Billy Faber; Larry Fotine; Fred Meadows	Sentimentally Yours	1962	
"You're Stronger Than Me"	Cochran; Jimmy Key	Did not originally appear on a major-label album	1962	
"You're Stronger Than Me"	Cochran; Key	So Wrong/You're Stronger Than Me	1962	
"Your Cheatin' Heart"	Williams	Sentimentally Yours	1962	
"Your Kinda Love"	Roy Drusky; Alex Zanetis	A Portrait of Patsy Cline	1962	
