= Patsy Cline discography =

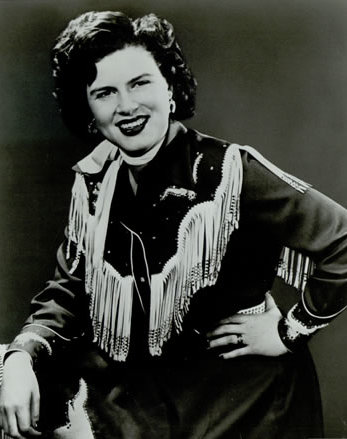
- Publicity photo of Patsy Cline distributed by MCA Records between 1973-75.
- Studio albums: 3
- Extended plays: 6
- Compilation albums: 1
- Singles: 24
- Other charted songs: 6
- Other album appearances: 1

The discography of American music artist Patsy Cline consists of three studio albums, 24 singles, six extended plays, one compilation album, six other charted songs and one album appearance. Cline's discography contains material released during her lifetime. Her first recordings took place under the direction of 4 Star Records. Cline's first single, "A Church, a Courtroom, Then Goodbye," was released in July 1955. 4 Star issued 17 singles during Cline's four years recording with them. However, only "Walkin' After Midnight" (1957) became a major hit, reaching number 2 on the Billboard country songs chart and number 12 on the Billboard pop music chart.

Cline signed with Decca Records in 1960, and thereafter her recordings brought her more commercial success. "I Fall to Pieces" was her first Decca single. It became her first number 1 hit on the Billboard country chart and a major crossover pop hit. A follow-up single, "Crazy," was also released in 1961, peaking at number 2 on the Billboard country chart and number 9 on the pop chart. Cline's second studio album, Showcase, was released the same year, and then re-released in 1963.

"She's Got You" was released in 1962 as Cline's next single. It became her second number 1 hit on the Billboard country songs chart, her fourth Billboard pop crossover hit, and her first single to chart in the United Kingdom. While awaiting a full album release, Decca issued several extended plays in 1962, including Patsy Cline and She's Got You. Cline's third studio album, Sentimentally Yours, was also issued in 1962. It was the final studio album issued in her lifetime. The last single issued during her lifetime was "Leavin' on Your Mind" in 1963. It reached the top 10 on the Billboard country chart after Cline's death in March 1963.

== Albums ==
=== Studio albums ===
List of studio albums, with selected chart positions and other relevant details
Title	Album details	Peak chart positions
Title	Album details	US
Patsy Cline	Released: August 1957; Label: Decca (DL 8611); Formats: LP	—
Showcase	Released: November 1961; Label: Decca (DL 74202); Formats: LP	73
Sentimentally Yours	Released: August 1962; Label: Decca (DL 74282); Formats: LP	—
"—" denotes a recording that did not chart or was not released in that territory.

=== Compilation albums ===
List of compilations albums, showing all relevant details
Title	Album details
Patsy Cline's Golden Hits	Released: 1962; Label: Everest (X7176); Formats: LP

=== Extended plays ===
List of extended play albums, showing all relevant details
Title	Album details
Songs by Patsy Cline	Released: August 5, 1957; Label: Coral (EC 81159); Formats: EP
Patsy Cline	Released: August 5, 1957; Label: Decca (ED 2542); Formats: EP
Patsy Cline	Released: August 14, 1961; Label: Decca (ED 2703); Formats: EP
Patsy Cline	Released: January 29, 1962; Label: Decca (ED 2707); Formats: EP
She's Got You	Released: April 20, 1962; Label: Decca (ED 2719); Formats: EP
So Wrong/You're Stronger Than Me	Released: September 24, 1962; Label: Decca (ED 2729); Formats: EP

== Singles ==
List of singles, with selected chart positions, showing other relevant details
Title	Year	Peak chart positions						Certifications	Album
Title	Year	US	US Cou.	US AC	AUS	CAN	UK	Certifications	Album
"A Church, a Courtroom, Then Goodbye"	1955	—	—	—	—	—	—		Songs by Patsy Cline
"Hidin' Out"	1955	—	—	—	—	—	—		Songs by Patsy Cline
"I Love You, Honey"	1956	—	—	—	—	—	—		—N/a
"I've Loved and Lost Again"	1956	—	—	—	—	—	—		—N/a
"Walkin' After Midnight"	1957	12	2	—	33	—	—		Patsy Cline
"Today, Tomorrow and Forever"	1957	—	—	—	—	—	—		—N/a
"Three Cigarettes in an Ashtray"	1957	—	—	—	—	—	—		Patsy Cline
"I Don't Wanta"	1957	—	—	—	—	—	—		Patsy Cline
"Stop the World (and Let Me Off)"	1958	—	—	—	—	—	—		—N/a
"Come On In"	1958	—	—	—	—	—	—		—N/a
"I Can See an Angel"	1958	—	—	—	—	—	—		—N/a
"If I Could See the World (Through the Eyes of a Child)"	1958	—	—	—	—	—	—		—N/a
"Dear God"	1958	—	—	—	—	—	—		—N/a
"Cry Not for Me"	1959	—	—	—	—	—	—		—N/a
"Gotta Lot of Rhythm in My Soul"	1959	—	—	—	—	—	—		—N/a
"Lovesick Blues"	1960	—	—	—	—	—	—		—N/a
"Crazy Dreams"	1960	—	—	—	—	—	—		—N/a
"I Fall to Pieces"	1961	12	1	6	13	2	—		Showcase
"Crazy"	1961	9	2	2	56	8	—	BPI: Gold; RMNZ: Gold	Showcase
"She's Got You"	1962	14	1	3	28	17	43		Sentimentally Yours
"When I Get Thru with You (You'll Love Me Too)"	1962	53	10	—	76	30	—		—N/a
"So Wrong"	1962	85	14	—	—	—	—		So Wrong/You're Stronger Than Me
"Heartaches"	1962	73	—	—	—	—	31		Sentimentally Yours
"Leavin' on Your Mind"	1963	83	8	—	—	—	—		The Patsy Cline Story
"—" denotes a recording that did not chart or was not released in that territory.

== Other charted songs ==
List of charted songs, with selected chart positions, showing other relevant details
Title	Year	Peak chart positions			Album	Notes
Title	Year	US	US Cou.	AUS	Album	Notes
"A Poor Man's Roses (Or a Rich Man's Gold)"	1957	—	14	27	—N/a	(Note: B-side to "Walkin' After Midnight".)
"Who Can I Count On"	1961	99	—	—	Patsy Cline (ED 2707)	(Note: B-side to "Crazy".)
"Strange"	1962	97	—	—	Sentimentally Yours	(Note: B-side to "She's Got You".)
"Imagine That"	1962	90	21	—	—N/a	(Note: B-side to "When I Get Thru' with You".)
"You're Stronger Than Me"	1962	— (Note: "You're Stronger Than Me" peaked at number 3 on the Billboard Bubbling Under Hot 100 singles chart, a list which acts as a 25-song extension of the Hot 100.)	—	—	So Wrong/You're Stronger Than Me	(Note: B-side to "So Wrong".)
"Why Can't He Be You"	1962	— (Note: "Why Can't He Be You" peaked at number 7 on the Billboard Bubbling Under Hot 100 singles chart, a list which acts as a 25-song extension of the Hot 100.)	—	—	Patsy Cline's Greatest Hits	(Note: B-side to "Heartaches".)
"—" denotes a recording that did not chart or was not released in that territory.

== Other appearances ==
List of album guest appearances, showing year released and album name
Title	Year	Other artist(s)	Album	Ref.
"Cozy Inn" (uncredited background vocals)	1961	Leon McAuliffe	Cozy Inn	

== See also ==
- Patsy Cline posthumous discography
