= The Patsy Cline Story =

Compilation album by Patsy Cline
- Released: June 10, 1963
- Recorded: November 16, 1960 – February 5, 1963
- Genre: Country, traditional pop
- Length: 60:53
- Label: Decca (1963); MCA (1988)
- Producer: Owen Bradley

Patsy Cline chronology
Sentimentally Yours (1962)	The Patsy Cline Story (1963)	A Portrait of Patsy Cline (1964)

1988 Re-issued cover
- In 1988, the album was digitally remastered on a CD format with a new cover, as shown above.

Singles from The Patsy Cline Story
- 1. "Leavin' on Your Mind" Released: January 7, 1963; 2. "Sweet Dreams (Of You)" Released: April 1963

Professional ratings
Review scores
Source	Rating
Allmusic	4.5/5 stars

The Patsy Cline Story is a double compilation album consisting of American country music singer Patsy Cline's best-known songs between 1961 and 1963. The album was released on June 10, 1963, three months following Cline's death.

== Background ==
The Patsy Cline Story is a 24-track two-disc collection Cline's label, Decca Records released following Cline's death in a plane crash in March of that year. The album contains Cline's biggest hits, including "Walkin' After Midnight" (the 1961 remake), "I Fall to Pieces," "Crazy," "She's Got You," and "Sweet Dreams." It also contains lesser-known songs that weren't hits for Cline, including "You're Stronger Than Me." The Patsy Cline Story replaced Cline's fourth studio album that was supposed to be released in the end of March 1963, Faded Love, but due to her death in early March, it was never released. The album included two singles that were released posthumously in 1963, "Leavin' on Your Mind" and "Sweet Dreams (Of You)," both of which reached the Top 10 on the Billboard Country Chart.

When Decca Records changed to MCA Records in 1973, the album was re-issued and the insert in the gatefold was also changed. Shortly afterward, copies eliminated the gatefold completely, and therefore both of the records were contained in a single sleeve. In 1988, the album was digitally remastered and reissued again on a CD format with a new cover.

== Individual tracks ==
While the album features Cline's most well-known hits, the album also contains additional extras including Bob Wills' "San Antonio Rose" and Gogi Grant's "The Wayward Wind," both from Cline's 1961 studio album, Patsy Cline Showcase. It also contains her 1962 hits, "So Wrong" and "Imagine That," which were never released on albums before.

== Track listing ==
Record one
No.	Title	Writer(s)	Original album	Length
1.	"Heartaches"	Al Hoffman; John Klenner	Sentimentally Yours, 1962	2:08
2.	"She's Got You"	Hank Cochran	Sentimentally Yours	2:58
3.	"Walkin' After Midnight"	Alan Block; Don Hecht	Showcase, 1961	1:58
4.	"Strange"	Fred Burch; Mel Tillis	Sentimentally Yours	2:12
5.	"Leavin' on Your Mind"	Webb Pierce; Wayne Walker		2:25
6.	"South of the Border (Down Mexico Way)"	Michael Carr; Jimmy Kennedy	Showcase	2:25
7.	"Foolin' 'Round"	Harlan Howard; Buck Owens	Showcase	2:11
8.	"I Fall to Pieces"	Howard; Cochran	Showcase	2:48
9.	"A Poor Man's Roses (Or a Rich Man's Gold)"	Milton DeLugg; Bob Hillard	Showcase	2:34
10.	"Tra Le La Le La Triangle"	Burch; Marijohn Wilkin		2:14
11.	"True Love"	Cole Porter	Showcase	2:06
12.	"Imagine That"	Justin Tubb		2:53

Record two
No.	Title	Writer(s)	Original album	Length
1.	"Back in Baby's Arms"	Bob Montgomery		2:03
2.	"Crazy"	Willie Nelson	Showcase	2:42
3.	"You're Stronger Than Me"	Cochran; Jimmy Key		2:52
4.	"Seven Lonely Days"	Marshall Brown; Alden Shuman; Earl Shuman	Showcase	2:11
5.	"Sweet Dreams (Of You)"	Don Gibson		2:35
6.	"Your Cheatin' Heart"	Hank Williams	Sentimentally Yours	2:20
7.	"San Antonio Rose"	Bob Wills	Showcase	2:19
8.	"Why Can't He Be You"	Cochran		3:26
9.	"The Wayward Wind"	Stanley Lebowsy; Herb Newman	Showcase	3:20
10.	"So Wrong"	Carl Perkins; Danny Dill; Mel Tillis		3:00
11.	"I Love You So Much it Hurts"	Floyd Tillman	Showcase	2:12
12.	"You Belong to Me"	Pee Wee King; Chilton Price; Redd Stewart	Sentimentally Yours	3:03
Total length:				60:53

== Personnel ==
- Harold Bradley – electric bass
- Owen Bradley – producer
- Patsy Cline – vocals
- Floyd Cramer – piano
- Ray Edenton – rhythm guitar
- Hank Garland – electric guitar
- Buddy Harman – drums
- Hoyt Hawkins – background vocals
- Walter Haynes – steel guitar
- Randy Hughes – rhythm guitar
- Joe Jenkins – acoustic bass
- The Jordanaires – background vocals
- Ben Keith – steel guitar
- Douglas Kirkham – drums
- Millie Kirkham – background vocals
- Grady Martin – electric guitar
- Neal Matthews Jr. – background vocals
- Bob Moore – acoustic bass
- Bill Pursell – organ, vibraphone
- Hargus "Pig" Robbins – piano
- Gordon Stoker – background vocals
- Ray C. Walker – background vocals
- Rita Faye Wilson – autoharp

== Charts ==
Album – Billboard (North America)

Year	Chart	Position
1963	Country Albums	9
1963	Top LP's	74

Singles - Billboard (North America)

Year	Single	Chart	Position
1963	"Leavin' on Your Mind"	Country Singles	8
1963	"Leavin' on Your Mind"	Pop Singles	84
1963	"Sweet Dreams (Of You)"	Country Singles	5
1963	"Sweet Dreams (Of You)"	Pop Singles	44
1963	"Sweet Dreams (Of You)"	Adult Contemporary Singles	15
