= So Wrong/You're Stronger Than Me =

EP by Patsy Cline
- Released: September 24, 1962
- Recorded: February 12–28, 1962
- Studio: Bradley Studios (Nashville, Tennessee)
- Genre: Country
- Label: Decca
- Producer: Owen Bradley

Patsy Cline chronology
Sentimentally Yours (1962)	So Wrong/You're Stronger Than Me (1962)	The Patsy Cline Story (1963)

So Wrong/You're Stronger Than Me is an EP released by American country music singer, Patsy Cline on September 24, 1962. It was the third and final EP Cline would release that year.

So Wrong/You're Stronger Than Me contained four songs, two on each side of the record that it was released on. The first two songs on side one were new: "So Wrong" and "You're Stronger Than Me." "So Wrong" was the third single Cline released in 1962, peaking at No. 14 on the Billboard Country Chart, and its flip side was "You're Stronger Than Me" (the re-recorded version). Because the single was not released on any album, this EP served as the source of obtaining the single and its B-side. On side two, two songs from Cline's 1962 album, Sentimentally Yours, were put on the EP: "Heartaches" and "Your Cheatin' Heart."

This was Cline's last EP collection that was released in her lifetime, as she was killed in a plane crash less than a year later in March 1963. However, several other EPs would be released following her death. The cover photo for So Wrong/You're Stronger Than Me was taken by photographer, Hal Buksbaum.

Although not released as a single, "You're Stronger Than Me" was also covered by George Strait on his 2000 album titled George Strait.

== Track listing ==
Side 1:

1. "So Wrong" — (Carl Perkins, Danny Dill, Mel Tillis) 3:00
2. "You're Stronger Than Me" — (Hank Cochran, Jimmy Key) 2:37
  - 1962 re-recorded version

Side 2:

1. "Heartaches" — (Al Hoffman, John Klenner) 2:11
2. "Your Cheatin' Heart" — (Hank Williams) 2:19

== Personnel ==
All sessions were recorded at Bradley Film and Music Studios in Nashville, Tennessee, United States.

- Byron Bach — cello
- Brenton Banks — violin
- Harold Bradley — 6-string electric bass
- Cecil Brower — violin
- Howard Carpenter — viola
- Patsy Cline — lead vocals
- Floyd Cramer — piano
- Ray Edenton — rhythm guitar
- Buddy Harman — drums
- Walter Haynes — steel guitar
- Randy Hughes — acoustic guitar
- Lillian Hunt — violin
- The Jordanaires — background vocals
- Grady Martin — electric guitar
- Bob Moore — acoustic bass
- Bill Pursell — organ
- Verne Richardson — violin
- Ed Tarpley — viola
- Joe Zinkan — acoustic bass
