= She's Got You (EP) =

EP by Patsy Cline
- Released: April 20, 1962
- Recorded: August 17 – December 17, 1961
- Studio: Bradley Studios (Nashville, Tennessee)
- Genre: Country
- Label: Decca
- Producer: Owen Bradley

Patsy Cline chronology
Patsy Cline (1962)	She's Got You (1962)	Sentimentally Yours (1962)

She's Got You is an EP released by American country music singer, Patsy Cline on April 20, 1962. It was the second EP Cline released in that year.

She's Got You contained two new songs: the title track and "Strange." The title track was released as a single in January 1962 and was climbing the charts during the time of this EP's release. Its B-side was "Strange." The EP would serve as the temporary source of acquiring Cline's new single until the album containing it, Sentimentally Yours, would be released that August. The other two songs included on She's Got You were cuts from her 1961 album: "The Wayward Wind" and "I Love You So Much it Hurts."

The EP was released on a record and the cover photograph was taken by photographer, Hal Buksbaum.

== Track listing ==
Side one

1. "She's Got You" – (Hank Cochran) 2:58
2. "Strange" – (Fred Burch, Mel Tillis) 2:13

Side two

1. "The Wayward Wind" – (Stanley Lebowsky, Herb Newman) 3:15
2. "I Love You So Much it Hurts" – (Floyd Tillman) 2:11

== Personnel ==
All recording sessions took place at Bradley Film and Music Studios in Nashville, Tennessee, United States.

- Byron Bach – cello
- Brenton Banks – violin
- George Binkley III – violin
- Harold Bradley – 6-string electric bass
- John Bright – viola
- Cecil Brower – viola
- Patsy Cline – lead vocals
- Floyd Cramer – organ, piano
- Walter Haynes – steel guitar
- Buddy Harman – drums
- Randy Hughes – acoustic guitar
- The Jordanaires – background vocals
- Lillian Hunt – violin
- Grady Martin – electric guitar
- Bob Moore – acoustic bass
- Suzanne Parker – violin
- Bill Pursell – organ
- Hargus "Pig" Robbins – piano
