= Patsy Cline (1962 EP) =

EP by Patsy Cline
- Released: January 29, 1962
- Recorded: August 21–25, 1961
- Studio: Bradley Studios (Nashville, Tennessee)
- Genre: Country
- Label: Decca
- Producer: Owen Bradley

Patsy Cline chronology
Showcase (1961)	Patsy Cline (1962)	She's Got You (1962)

Patsy Cline is an EP released by American country music singer, Patsy Cline on January 29, 1962. It included four new songs from her recording sessions under Decca Records the previous year.

This was Cline's third extended play album to be self-titled. The EP consisted of four songs Cline had recorded since her near-fatal automobile accident in June 1961. The first side of the record contained her single from late 1961, "Crazy" and a cover of Buck Owens' "Foolin' Around." The flip side contained "Who Can I Count on" (the original B-side the "Crazy" single) and a cover version of "South of the Border (Down Mexico Way)." When the EP was released in early 1962, "Crazy" had already become a major country-pop crossover hit, peaking at No. 2 on the Hot Country Songs chart and No. 9 on the Billboard Hot 100. All of the songs included on this EP were also released on Cline's album released in late 1961, Patsy Cline Showcase.

The cover photograph was taken by photographer Les Leverett.

== Track listing ==
Side one

1. "Crazy" – (Willie Nelson) 2:41
2. "Foolin' 'Round" – (Harlan Howard, Buck Owens) 2:12

Side two

1. "Who Can I Count on" – (Sammy Masters) 2:14
2. "South of the Border (Down Mexico Way)" – (Michael Carr, Jimmy Kennedy) 2:25

== Personnel ==
All recording sessions took place at Bradley Film and Music Studios in Nashville, Tennessee, United States.

- Harold Bradley – 6-string electric bass
- Owen Bradley – organ
- Patsy Cline – lead vocals
- Floyd Cramer – piano
- Buddy Harman – drums
- Walter Haynes – steel guitar
- Randy Hughes – acoustic guitar
- The Jordanaires – background vocals
- Grady Martin – electric guitar
- Bob Moore – acoustic bass
- Hargus "Pig" Robbins – piano
