= Sentimentally Yours =

Studio album by Patsy Cline
- Released: August 6, 1962
- Recorded: August 25, 1961 – February 28, 1962
- Studio: Bradley Studios, Nashville, Tennessee
- Genre: Country; traditional pop
- Length: 28:48
- Label: Decca (1962); MCA (reissues; 1973 & 1988)
- Producer: Owen Bradley

Patsy Cline chronology
Showcase (1961)	Sentimentally Yours (1962)	The Patsy Cline Story (1963)

Re-released cover
- After the second single from the album, "Heartaches", became a hit on the Pop charts in late 1962, a re-released version had the text "And featuring Heartaches" added to the cover of the album.

Singles from Sentimentally Yours
- 1. "She's Got You" Released: January 10, 1962; 2. "Heartaches"

Professional ratings
Review scores
Source	Rating
Allmusic	4/5 stars
New Record Mirror	4/5 stars
Pitchfork	8.9/10

Sentimentally Yours is the third and final studio album by American country music singer Patsy Cline, released August 6, 1962. The album was the final studio album Cline would release before her death in a plane crash less than a year later. (Her last album was recorded in 1963 and released posthumously.)

== Background ==
Sentimentally Yours featured two of Cline's major hits singles that year. The first single, "She's Got You", was released early in 1962 and became a #1 hit on the Billboard Country chart and crossed over into the Pop chart to #14, becoming another major crossover hit for Cline. The second single, a cover of "Heartaches", charted only on the Billboard Pop chart in the United States. Both singles charted on the United Kingdom Singles chart in 1962, becoming Cline's first singles to do so. The album did not include all of Cline's hits from that year. Her other hits included the Top 10 "When I Get Thru' With You" / "Imagine That" and the Top 15 hit "So Wrong," which were not released on albums.

The original version consisted of a two-sided LP, with six songs on each side. After "Heartaches" became a hit on the Pop charts in late 1962, the text "and featuring Heartaches" was added to the cover. Decca merged with MCA Records in 1962 and the album was re-released under the MCA name in 1973. The album was digitally remastered on a CD/LP/cassette format for the third re-issue in 1988, which was also released on MCA. The originally released cover did not contain the yellow text underneath Cline's name.

== Recording ==
The first recordings for the album began August 25, 1961, and ended on February 28, 1962. All sessions were produced by Owen Bradley, and held at the Bradley Film and Recording Studios in Nashville. On December 17, Cline recorded "She's Got You" only. Between then and February, Cline did four more recording sessions to complete the number of songs needed for the album (12 songs were on this album).

== Music ==
Of the twelve songs on this album, only two were new songs, "She's Got You" and its flip side, "Strange". The ten remaining tracks were cover versions of standards, including Jo Stafford's "You Belong to Me", Hank Williams' "Half As Much", and Hank Williams' "Your Cheatin' Heart." The single "Heartaches" was also a standard recording. Cline did mainly standards for this album as an attempt to appeal to the Pop market.

== Track listing ==
Side one

1. "She's Got You" (Hank Cochran) – 2:59
2. "Heartaches" (Al Hoffman, John Klenner) – 2:11
3. "That's My Desire" (Helmy Kresa, Carroll Loveday) – 3:01
4. "Your Cheatin' Heart" (Hank Williams) – 2:19
5. "Anytime" (Herbert "Happy" Lawson) – 1:57
6. "You Made Me Love You (I Didn't Want to Do It)" (Joseph McCarthy, James V. Monaco) – 2:45

Side two

1. "Strange" (Fred Burch, Mel Tillis) 2:13
2. "You Belong to Me" (Pee Wee King, Chilton Price, Redd Stewart) – 3:03
3. "You Were Only Fooling (While I Was Falling In Love)" (Billy Faber, Larry Fotine, Fred Meadows) – 1:56
4. "Half As Much" (Curley Williams) – 2:28
5. "I Can't Help It (If I'm Still in Love with You)" (Hank Williams) – 2:56
6. "Lonely Street" (Carl Belew, Kenny Sowder, W.S. Stevenson) – 2:32

== Personnel ==
- Byron Bach – cello
- Brenton Banks – violin
- Owen Bradley – producer
- Harold Bradley – electric bass
- Cecil Brower – viola
- Howard Carpenter – viola
- Patsy Cline – lead vocals
- Floyd Cramer – organ
- Ray Edenton – rhythm guitar
- Solie Fott – violin
- Buddy Harman – drums
- Walter Haynes – steel guitar
- Randy Hughes – acoustic guitar
- Lillian Hunt – violin
- The Jordanaires – background vocals
- Grady Martin – electric guitar
- Charlie McCoy – harmonica
- Bob Moore – acoustic bass
- Bill Pursell – organ
- Verne Richardson – violin
- Hargus "Pig" Robbins – piano
- Ed Tarpley – viola
- Joe Zinkan – acoustic bass

== Charts ==
Singles - Billboard (North America)

Year	Single	Chart	Position
1962	"She's Got You"	Country Singles	1
1962	"She's Got You"	Pop Singles	14
1962	"She's Got You"	Adult Contemporary Singles	3
1962	"Strange"	Pop Singles	97
1962	"Heartaches"	Pop Singles	73
