= Treasury Varieties =

Treasury Varieties was an American syndicated weekly 30-minute radio program that aired on the Mutual network from 1948 to 1953. The program was sponsored by the U.S. Treasury Department to promote the sale of U.S. Savings Bonds. The show featured the music of entertainers backed by a studio orchestra, notably Henry Jerome and His Orchestra, who, over the life of the program, had the longest run. Frank H. Walldecker (1909–1995) was the announcer. Regulars with the Jerome Orchestra included Hal Burton (singer), Morrie Allen (singer), Joe Grimm (Joe Grimaldi) (singer), the Glee Club, and the Three Jays.

Other entertainers (1949) included Bob Chester and His Orchestra, featuring Bobby Breen (singer).

== Extant recordings of radio broadcasts ==
- 63035: May 28, 1948, Mutual

"The Third Man Theme," Frank H. Waldecker (1909–1995) (announcer), Hal Barton (vocal), Joe Grimm (Joe Grimaldi) (vocal), Maurie Allen (vocal), The Three Jays. 29:50

- 2313: January 21, 1950, Mutual

Larry Fotine and His Orchestra, Johnny Goodfellow (vocal)

Note: The indexing is that of J. David Goldin, Newtown, Connecticut: RadioGOLDINdex
