= Patsy Cline's Golden Hits =

Compilation album by Patsy Cline
- Released: 1962
- Recorded: January 5, 1956 – February 13, 1958
- Genre: Country, rockabilly
- Length: 25:33
- Label: Everest

Patsy Cline chronology
Patsy Cline Showcase (1961)	Patsy Cline's Golden Hits (1962)	Sentimentally Yours (1962)

Patsy Cline's Golden Hits is a 1962 compilation album that consisted of material recorded by country music singer Patsy Cline.

One of only two compilation albums released during Cline's lifetime, Patsy Cline's Golden Hits consisted of some tracks recorded by Cline under her first record label, 4 Star Records. It included her 1957 hit, "Walkin' After Midnight", and other lesser-known singles that were released, such as "I Don't Wanta", "Three Cigarettes (In an Ashtray)", and "I Can See an Angel". It was released by Everest Records and has not been reissued since its initial release in 1962. The exact month and day of its release is unknown.

The cover design for the album was designed by the Francis & Monahan Inc. and the liner notes were written by Lee Zhito.

== Track listing ==
Side 1:

1. "Just Out of Reach (Of My Two Open Arms)" — 2:33
2. "Ain't No Wheels on This Ship" — 2:25
3. "Stop the World (And Let Me Off)" — 2:02
4. "If I Could See the World (Through the Eyes of a Child)" — 2:24
5. "I Can't Forget You" — 2:47

Side 2:

1. "Walkin' After Midnight" — 2:35
2. "Too Many Secrets" — 2:25
3. "Three Cigarettes (In an Ashtray)" — 2:30
4. "(Write Me) In Care of the Blues" — 2:26
5. "Hungry for Love" — 2:35
6. "I Don't Wanta" — 2:29
7. "I Can See an Angel" — 2:47
