= Showcase (Patsy Cline album) =

Studio album by Patsy Cline
- Released: November 27, 1961
- Recorded: November 16, 1960 – August 25, 1961
- Studio: Bradley Studios, Nashville, Tennessee
- Genre: Country, traditional pop
- Length: 28:35
- Label: Decca (1961); MCA (re-release; 1973 & 1988)
- Producer: Owen Bradley

Patsy Cline chronology
Patsy Cline (1957)	Showcase (1961)	Sentimentally Yours (1962)

Re-released cover
- The cover of the re-released album in 1963

Singles from Showcase
- 1. "I Fall to Pieces" Released: January 30, 1961; 2. "Crazy" Released: October 16, 1961

Professional ratings
Review scores
Source	Rating
Allmusic	3/5 stars

Showcase is the second studio album by American country music singer Patsy Cline, recorded with The Jordanaires and released November 27, 1961. It was Cline's second studio album and her first since Patsy Cline in 1957.

== Background ==
The album produced two singles that became hits on both the Billboard country and pop charts. The first, "I Fall to Pieces," became Cline's first number one hit on the Billboard country chart and also reached the Top 15 on the pop Top 100 in 1961. The follow-up single, "Crazy," was also a huge hit, peaking in the top five on the Billboard country chart and in the Top 10 on the pop Top 100. "Crazy" was recorded after Cline's month-long hospitalization following a near-fatal car accident that June.

The original cover showed three different photos of Cline from a 1957 promotional photograph, according to Jay Orr and Ron Roy in the album's liner notes.

After her death, the album was re-released on Decca in 1963 and peaked for the first time on the Billboard 200, reaching number 73. The cover was changed to the more familiar shot of Cline in a white blouse, red capri pants and gold booties,. The album was reissued in 1973 by MCA Records (which took over Decca in 1973) and it was later digitally remastered and re-released on a CD/LP/Cassette in 1988, which included the same cover as the 1963 re-release.

Showcase was also released internationally. In 1961, the album was released in the United Kingdom by Brunswick Records and in New Zealand by Festival Records.

== Recording sessions ==
Recording began November 16, 1960 at the Bradley Film and Recording Studios in Nashville, Tennessee over five sessions, ending August 25, 1961. Showcase was the first set of sessions after Cline's near-death in a car crash in 1961. The recordings teamed her up with The Jordanaires, who recorded also on Cline's 1962 album on Decca. Legendary country producer Owen Bradley produced the album. Bradley helped smooth Cline's sound to develop her own style of the Nashville sound.

== Individual tracks ==
This album includes many cover versions of previously recorded hits on the country and pop charts by other artists. The remakes include pop singer Gogi Grant's "The Wayward Wind," Bonnie Lou's "Seven Lonely Days," Cole Porter's "True Love," and Bob Wills' "San Antonio Rose."

In addition, Cline recorded remakes of her 1957 hits, "Walkin' After Midnight" and "A Poor Man's Roses (Or a Rich Man's Gold)."

== Track listings ==
=== Vinyl version ===
Side one
No.	Title	Writer(s)	Length
1.	"I Fall to Pieces"	Hank Cochran; Harlan Howard	2:48
2.	"Foolin' Round"	Howard; Buck Owens	2:14
3.	"The Wayward Wind"	Stanley Lebowsky; Herb Newman	3:22
4.	"South of the Border (Down Mexico Way)"	Michael Carr; Jimmy Kennedy	2:26
5.	"I Love You So Much It Hurts"	Floyd Tillman	2:15
6.	"Seven Lonely Days"	Marshall Brown; Earl Shuman; Alden Shuman	2:13

Side two
No.	Title	Writer(s)	Length
1.	"Crazy"	Willie Nelson	2:43
2.	"San Antonio Rose"	Bob Wills	2:20
3.	"True Love"	Cole Porter	2:09
4.	"Walkin' After Midnight" (re-recording)	Alan Block; Don Hecht	2:01
5.	"A Poor Man's Roses (or a Rich Man's Gold)" (re-recording)	Bob Hilliard; Milton DeLugg	2:38
6.	"Have You Ever Been Lonely (Have You Ever Been Blue)"	George Brown; Peter DeRose	2:11

=== Compact disc version ===
Showcase with the Jordanaires (CD version)
No.	Title	Writer(s)	Length
1.	"I Fall to Pieces"	Cochran; Howard	2:47
2.	"Foolin' Round"	Howard; Owens	2:12
3.	"The Wayward Wind"	Lebowsky; Newman	3:15
4.	"South of the Border (Down Mexico Way)"	Carr; Kennedy	2:25
5.	"I Love You So Much It Hurts"	Tillman	2:11
6.	"Seven Lonely Days"	Brown; E. Shuman; A. Shuman	2:05
7.	"Crazy"	Nelson	2:41
8.	"San Antonio Rose"	Wills	2:13
9.	"True Love"	Porter	2:06
10.	"Walkin' After Midnight"	Block; Hecht	2:00
11.	"A Poor Man's Roses (Or a Rich Man's Gold)"	Hilliard; DeLugg	2:30
12.	"Have You Ever Been Lonely (Have You Ever Been Blue)"	Brown; DeRose	2:10

=== Digital version ===
Showcase with the Jordanaires (all songs are credited to Patsy Cline featuring The Jordanaires)
No.	Title	Writer(s)	Length
1.	"I Fall to Pieces"	Cochran; Howard	2:50
2.	"Foolin' Round"	Howard; Owens	2:13
3.	"The Wayward Wind"	Lebowsky; Newman	3:20
4.	"South of the Border (Down Mexico Way)"	Carr; Kennedy	2:26
5.	"I Love You So Much It Hurts"	Tillman	2:14
6.	"Seven Lonely Days"	Brown; E. Shuman; A. Shuman	2:12
7.	"Crazy"	Nelson	2:43
8.	"San Antonio Rose"	Wills	2:20
9.	"True Love"	Porter	2:07
10.	"Walkin' After Midnight"	Block; Hecht	2:00
11.	"A Poor Man's Roses (Or a Rich Man's Gold)"	Hilliard; DeLugg	2:36
12.	"Have You Ever Been Lonely (Have You Ever Been Blue)"	Brown; DeRose	2:10

== Personnel ==
All credits are adapted from the original 1961 liner notes of Showcase.

Musical personnel

- Byron Bach – cello
- Brenton Banks – violin
- George Binkley III – violin
- Owen Bradley – organ (on "Crazy")
- John Bright – viola
- Cecil Brower – viola
- Patsy Cline – lead vocals
- Floyd Cramer – piano
- Hank Garland – electric guitar
- Buddy Harman – drums
- Walter Haynes – steel guitar
- Randy Hughes – acoustic guitar
- Lillian Hunt – violin
- The Jordanaires – background vocals
- Ben Keith – steel guitar
- Doug Kirkham – drums
- Grady Martin – electric guitar
- Bob Moore – acoustic bass
- Suzanne Parker – piano
- Hargus "Pig" Robbins – piano

Technical personnel

- Owen Bradley – producer

== Chart performance ==
Chart (1963)	Peak position
US Billboard 200	73
