= Buddy Harman =

American drummer

- Born: Murrey Mizell Harman Jr. December 23, 1928; Nashville, Tennessee
- Died: August 21, 2008 (aged 79) Nashville, Tennessee
- Occupations: Drummer, session musician
- Instruments: Drums, percussion
- Formerly of: Patsy Cline, Roy Orbison, Elvis Presley, Chet Atkins, Marty Robbins, Johnny Cash, The Everly Brothers and many others

Murrey Mizell "Buddy" Harman Jr. (December 23, 1928 – August 21, 2008) was an American country music session musician.

== Career ==
Born in Nashville, Tennessee, Harman studied music at Roy C. Knapp School of Percussion. He returned to Nashville in 1952. Harman played drums on over 18,000 sessions for artists such as Elvis Presley, Jerry Lee Lewis, Moon Mullican, Songwriter Larry Petree, Martha Carson, Dolly Parton, Brenda Lee, Tammy Wynette, Loretta Lynn, Roy Orbison, Connie Francis, Chet Atkins, Marty Robbins, Ray Price, Roger Miller, Johnny Cash, Willie Nelson, Waylon Jennings, George Jones, Kenny Rogers, Barbara Mandrell, Eddy Arnold, Perry Como, Merle Haggard, Reba McEntire, Gillian Welch and many more.

== With Patsy Cline ==
Harman appeared on almost all of Cline's Decca sessions from her first in November 1960 to her last in February 1962, during which time he backed her on songs such as:

- Crazy
- She's Got You
- Foolin' Around
- Seven Lonely Days
- You Belong to Me
- Heartaches
- True Love
- Faded Love
- Someday (You'll Want Me to Want You)
- Sweet Dreams
- Crazy Arms
- San Antonio Rose
- The Wayward Wind
- A Poor Man's Roses (Or a Rich Man's Gold)
- Have You Ever Been Lonely (Have You Ever Been Blue)?
- South of the Border (Down Mexico Way)
- Walkin' After Midnight (1961 recording)
- You Made Me Love You (I Didn't Want To Do It)
- Your Cheatin' Heart
- That's My Desire
- Half As Much
- I Can't Help It (If I'm Still in Love with You)
- Leavin' On Your Mind
- Someday (You'll Want Me To Want You)
- Love Letters In The Sand
- Blue Moon of Kentucky
- and more.

== Awards ==
Harman was the first regular drummer on the Grand Ole Opry. Some of Harman's awards include "Drummer of the Year" in 1981 from the Academy of Country Music and "Super Picker" Award for drums on the most No. 1 recordings from the Nashville NARAS chapter in 1975 and 1976.

== Death ==
Harman died at the Hospice Center in Nashville from congestive heart failure at the age of 79.

== Selected discography ==
=== Singles ===
Artist	Song title	Date	US charts	US Country charts	British charts
Everly Brothers	Bye Bye Love	1957	2	1	6
Elvis Presley	I Need Your Love Tonight	1958	4		1
Elvis Presley	I Got Stung	1958	8		1
Brenda Lee	Rockin' Around the Christmas Tree	1958	14		6
Brenda Lee	Sweet Nothin's	1959	4		4
Brenda Lee	Jambalaya (On the Bayou)	1959	14		
Brenda Lee	Let's Jump the Broomstick	1959	14		12
Johnny Horton	The Battle of New Orleans	1959	1		16
Everly Brothers	(Till) I Kissed You	1959	4		2
Ray Price	Heartaches by the Number	1959		2	
Elvis Presley	A Big Hunk o' Love	1959	1		4
Elvis Presley	(Now and Then There's) A Fool Such as I	1959	2	16 R&B chart	1
Everly Brothers	Cathy's Clown	1960	1		1
Brenda Lee	I'm Sorry	1960	1	4 R&B chart	12
Brenda Lee	That's All You Gotta Do	1960	6	19 R&B chart	
Elvis Presley	Stuck on You	1960	1		3
Elvis Presley	It's Now or Never (song)	1960	1		1
Elvis Presley	Are You Lonesome Tonight?	1960	1		1
Elvis Presley	Surrender	1960	1		1
Roy Orbison	Only the Lonely	1960	2		36
Roy Orbison	Running Scared	1960	1		9
Elvis Presley	Little Sister	1961	5		1
Elvis Presley	I Feel So Bad	1961	5		
Elvis Presley	(Marie's the Name) His Latest Flame	1961	4		1
Elvis Presley	Good Luck Charm	1961	1		1
Patsy Cline	Crazy	1961	9		14
Roy Orbison	Crying	1962	2		25
Roy Orbison	Dream Baby (How Long Must I Dream)	1962	4		2
Patsy Cline	Imagine That	1962	90	21	
Patsy Cline	Heartaches	1962	73		31
Patsy Cline	So Wrong	1962	85	14	
Patsy Cline	When I Get Thru with You	1962	53	10	
Patsy Cline	She's Got You	1962	14	1	43
Patsy Cline	Leavin' on Your Mind	1963	83	8	
Johnny Cash	Ring of Fire	1963	17	1	
Roy Orbison	In Dreams	1963	7	3	6
Roy Orbison	Distant Drums	1963			
Roy Orbison	It's Over	1964	9	1	1
Roy Orbison	Oh, Pretty Woman	1964	1		1
Elvis Presley	Viva Las Vegas	1964	29		17
Roger Miller	Dang Me	1964	7	1	
Roger Miller	Chug-a-Lug	1964	9	3	
Roger Miller	King of the Road	1965	4		1
Tammy Wynette	Stand by Your Man	1968	19	1	1
Loretta Lynn	Coal Miner's Daughter	1970	100	1	
Ween		1996			

=== Albums ===
With Kai Winding

- Modern Country (Verve, 1964)

== See also ==
- The Nashville A-Team
