= Grady Martin =

American musician (1929–2001)

- Martin in the 1950s

Background information
- Born: Thomas Grady Martin; January 17, 1929; Chapel Hill, Tennessee, U.S.
- Died: December 3, 2001 (aged 72) Lewisburg, Tennessee, U.S.
- Genres: country music, rockabilly
- Occupations: guitarist, session musician
- Instruments: guitar, fiddle
- Years active: 1946–1994
- Labels: Decca, Monument

Thomas Grady Martin (January 17, 1929 – December 3, 2001) was an American session guitarist in country music and rockabilly.

A member of the Nashville A-Team, he played guitar on hits such as Marty Robbins' "El Paso", Loretta Lynn's "Coal Miner's Daughter", and Sammi Smith's "Help Me Make It Through the Night". During a nearly 50-year career, Martin backed many performers, among them, Hank Williams, Elvis Presley, Buddy Holly, Johnny Burnette, Don Woody and Arlo Guthrie, Johnny Cash, Patsy Cline, and Bing Crosby. He is a member of the Rockabilly Hall of Fame and was elected to the Country Music Hall of Fame in March 2015.

== Biography ==
Grady Martin was born in Chapel Hill, Tennessee, United States. He grew up on a farm with his oldest sister, Lois, his older brothers, June and Bill, and his parents, Claude and Bessey. His mother played the piano and encouraged his musical talent.

At age 15, Martin was invited to perform regularly on WLAC-AM in Nashville, Tennessee, and made his recording debut two years later on February 15, 1946, with Curly Fox and Texas Ruby in Chicago, Illinois.

That same year, he joined Paul Howard's Western swing-oriented Arkansas Cotton Pickers as half of Howard's twin guitar ensemble with Robert "Jabbo" Arrington and performed on the Grand Ole Opry. When Howard left, Opry newcomer Little Jimmy Dickens hired several former Cotton Pickers, including Martin, as his original Country Boys road band. He later joined Big Jeff Bess and the Radio Playboys followed by a stint with the Bailes Brothers Band.

By 1950, Martin was a part of the rising Nashville recording scene as a studio guitarist and fiddler, and his guitar hooks propelled Red Foley's "Chattanoogie Shoe Shine Boy" and "Birmingham Bounce". In 1951, he signed with Decca Records with his own country-jazz band, Grady Martin and the Slew Foot Five. In addition to backing mainstream acts such as Bing Crosby and Burl Ives, they began to record in their own right, with later sessions under the name Grady Martin and his Winging Strings when he introduced his twin-neck Bigsby guitar. The band, with Hank Garland, Bob Moore, Tommy Jackson, and Bud Isaacs, made regular appearances on ABC-TV's Ozark Jubilee in the mid-1950s.

=== The Nashville A-Team ===
As a session musician starting in the late 1950s, Martin made his greatest mark on country and rockabilly music.

As a guitarist with the Nashville A-Team, he provided the guitar on the Marty Robbins hits "El Paso" (1959) and "Don't Worry" (1961), on Roy Orbison's "Oh, Pretty Woman" (1964), and Lefty Frizzell's "Saginaw, Michigan" (1964). His guitar work was also displayed in Johnny Horton's "The Battle of New Orleans" (1959) and "Honky Tonk Man" (1956), and especially his pure rockabilly sound on "I'm Coming Home" (1957). He shaped countless other classics, including Brenda Lee's "I'm Sorry", Willie Nelson's "On the Road Again", Ray Price's "For the Good Times", and Jeanne Pruett's "Satin Sheets".

Martin is credited with accidentally stumbling onto the electric guitar "fuzz" effect during a recording session with Robbins at Bradley Studios in Nashville; his six-string bass guitar was run through a faulty channel in a mixing console, generating the fuzz sound on "Don't Worry".

In the 1960s, he played on sessions with Joan Baez, J. J. Cale, and others and on Sammi Smith's 1971 hit, "Help Me Make It Through the Night", among the most successful country singles of all time. In the early 1970s, Martin played on records by Loretta Lynn and Conway Twitty, worked with Kris Kristofferson, and produced the country-rock band Brush Arbor.

=== With Patsy Cline ===
Martin appeared on almost all of Cline's Decca sessions from August 1961 to her last session in February 1962, during which time he backed her on songs such as:

- "Crazy"
- "She's Got You"
- "Foolin' Around"
- "Seven Lonely Days"
- "You Belong to Me"
- "Heartaches"
- "True Love"
- "Faded Love"
- "Someday (You'll Want Me to Want You)"
- "Sweet Dreams"
- "Crazy Arms"
- "San Antonio Rose"
- "The Wayward Wind"
- "A Poor Man's Roses (Or a Rich Man's Gold)"
- "Have You Ever Been Lonely (Have You Ever Been Blue)?"
- "South of the Border (Down Mexico Way)"
- "Walkin' After Midnight" (1961 recording)
- "You Made Me Love You (I Didn't Want To Do It)"
- "Your Cheatin' Heart"
- "That's My Desire"
- "Half As Much"
- "I Can't Help It (If I'm Still in Love with You)"
- "Leavin' On Your Mind"
- "Someday (You'll Want Me To Want You)"
- "Love Letters In The Sand"
- "Blue Moon of Kentucky"

=== Later years ===
In 1978, with his studio career over, Martin returned to the life of a touring musician, first with Jerry Reed and then as lead guitarist for Willie Nelson's band, appearing in Nelson's 1980 film Honeysuckle Rose. In 1994, deteriorating health forced him to retire, but he produced Nelson's 1995 honky tonk album, Just One Love.

The Nashville Entertainment Association gave him its first Master Award in 1983, and he was the 83rd inductee into the Rockabilly Hall of Fame. On April 5, 2000, he received a Chetty award for significant instrumental achievement at Nashville's Ryman Auditorium during the Chet Atkins Musician Days festival. Health problems prevented Martin from attending; Nelson, Vince Gill, and Marty Stuart presented the award—named after Atkins, who attended—to Martin's son, Joshua. Grady Martin was inducted into the Musicians Hall of Fame in 2007.

He was married three times and had three daughters, Alisa, Angie, and Julie, and seven sons, Grady Jr., Joe, Tal, Jason, Joshua, Justin, and Steve.

Martin died from a heart attack on December 3, 2001, in Lewisburg, Tennessee, and is interred at Hopper Cemetery in Marshall County, Tennessee.

== Selected discography ==
=== Grady Martin and the Slew Foot Five ===
- Powerhouse Dance Party (Decca, 1956)
- Juke Box Jamboree (Decca, 1956)
- The Roaring Twenties (Decca, 1957)
- 'Johnny Burnette and The Rock and Roll Trio ' (1957 LP) - (July 5 session: long believed all to be by Paul Burlison) - Recorded at Quonset Studio, 16th Avenue South, Nashville, Tennessee, July 2–5, 1956; lp includes songs recorded in 1957, at Pythian Temple (New York City)
- Hot Time Tonight (Decca, 1959)
- Big City Lights (Decca, 1960)
- Swingin' Down the River (Decca, 1962)
- Songs Everybody Knows (Decca, 1964)

=== Grady Martin ===
- Instrumentally Yours (Decca, 1965)
- A Touch of Country (Decca, 1967)
- Cowboy Classics (Monument, 1977)

=== Slewfoot Five ===
- The Happy Sound of the Slewfoot Five (Decca, 1967)
- Man Alive! It's the Slew Foot Five (Decca, 1968)

=== As sideman ===
With Eric Andersen

- Blue River (Columbia Records, 1972)

With Hoyt Axton

- American Dreams (Global Records, 1984)

With Joan Baez

- Any Day Now (Vanguard Records, 1968)
- David's Album (Vanguard Records, 1969)
- One Day at a Time (Vanguard Records, 1970)
- Come from the Shadows (A&M Records, 1972)
- Where Are You Now, My Son? (A&M Records, 1973)

With JJ Cale

- Okie (Shelter Records, 1974)

With Don Everly

- Brother Jukebox (Hickory Records, 1977)

With Arlo Guthrie

- Last of the Brooklyn Cowboys (Reprise Records, 1973)

With Ronnie Hawkins

- Rock and Roll Resurrection (Monument Records, 1972)
- Giant of Rock 'n' Roll (Monument Records, 1974)

With Roy Orbison

- Regeneration (Monument Records, 1976)

With John Prine

- Sweet Revenge (Atlantic Records, 1973)

With Leon Russell

- Hank Wilson's Back Vol. I (Shelter Records, 1973)

With Buffy Sainte-Marie

- I'm Gonna Be a Country Girl Again (Vanguard, 1968)

With Kai Winding

- Modern Country (Verve, 1964)
