= So Wrong =

Single by Patsy Cline
- B-side: "You're Stronger Than Me"
- Released: July 16, 1962
- Recorded: February 28, 1962
- Studio: Bradley Studios, Nashville, Tennessee
- Length: 3:01
- Label: Decca Records
- Songwriters: Carl Perkins, Danny Dill, Mel Tillis
- Producer: Owen Bradley

Patsy Cline singles chronology
"When I Get Through with You" (1962)	"So Wrong" (1962)	"Heartaches" (1962)

"So Wrong" is a song written by Carl Perkins, Danny Dill and Mel Tillis and popularized by country music artist Patsy Cline. The song was released as a single on Decca Records in 1962 by Patsy Cline.

== Background ==
Patsy Cline was best known for her string of Country and Pop ballads like "I Fall to Pieces", "Crazy" and "She's Got You". By 1962, Cline was already successful on both the Country and Pop singles charts. Her first hit that year was the song "She's Got You". After that, Cline released a string of hits, including "So Wrong". "So Wrong" was released in mid-1962 as a Decca 45 single, 31406, b/w "You're Stronger Than Me", and became a Billboard Top 20 Country Hit, reaching #14. Its success on the Pop charts was not as impressive as her previous hits, reaching #85 on the Pop charts. The song was released as a single in Canada on Decca and on Brunswick in the UK, 45-05874. The song was also released as a 45 single in New Zealand on Festival Records as FK-253 as a B side and as part of a picture sleeve 45 EP.

Cline uses her emotionally expressive voice in this song, as she did with many other hits. The song initially talks about how someone was wrong towards their lover. They regret how wrong they were for letting their lover go, and express how much they miss them.

The song appeared originally on the 1962 EP So Wrong/You're Stronger Than Me and was featured on the 1963 The Patsy Cline Story collection and the Patsy Cline's Greatest Hits album in 1967, which would sell over 10 million copies and be certified a Diamond album, one of the all-time best-selling country albums.

Cline performed the song live in 1963 on the Pet Milk Grand Ole Opry TV program on August 14, 1962.

"So Wrong" was featured on an episode of CSI.

Enid Cohen, Jessi Alexander, Pam Tillis on the 2002 album It's All Relative: Tillis Sings Tillis, Mandy Barnett on the 2011 album Sweet Dreams, and Terri Simpson have covered the song.

== Chart performance ==
Chart (1962)	Peak position
U.S. Billboard Hot Country Singles	14
U.S. Billboard Hot 100	85
U.S. Cash Box Top 100	66

== Sources ==
- Perkins, Carl, and David McGee. Go, Cat, Go!: The Life and Times of Carl Perkins, The King of Rockabilly. Hyperion Press, 1996, pages 253-254. ISBN 0-7868-6073-1
- Morrison, Craig. Go Cat Go!: Rockabilly Music and Its Makers. University of Illinois Press,
- Bego, Mark. I Fall to Pieces: The Music and the Life of Patsy Cline. Adams Media Corporation.
- Hazen, Cindy and Mike Freeman. Love Always, Patsy. The Berkley Publishing Group.
- Jones, Margaret (1998). "Patsy Cline". In The Encyclopedia of Country Music. Paul Kingsbury, Editor. New York: Oxford University Press. pp. 98–9.
- Nassour, Ellis. Honky Tonk Angel: The Intimate Story of Patsy Cline. St. Martins Press.
- Wolff, Kurt. Country Music: The Rough Guide. Penguin Publishing.
