= Gotta Lot of Rhythm in My Soul =

Single by Patsy Cline
- B-side: "I'm Blue Again"
- Released: July 20, 1959
- Recorded: January 9, 1959
- Studio: Bradley Studios, Nashville, Tennessee
- Genre: Country; Rockabilly
- Label: Decca
- Songwriter(s): W.S. Stevenson; Barbara Vaughan
- Producer(s): Owen Bradley

Patsy Cline singles chronology
"Cry Not for Me" (1959)	"Gotta Lot of Rhythm in My Soul" (1959)	"Lovesick Blues" (1960)

"Gotta Lot of Rhythm in My Soul" is a song first recorded by American country singer Patsy Cline. It was composed by W.S. Stevenson and Barbara Vaughan. It was released as a single in 1959 via Decca Records and was produced by Owen Bradley. It was among a handful of singles released on the Decca label that were unsuccessful for Cline following a major hit in 1957.

== Background ==
Patsy Cline had her only significant hit during the 1950s with "Walkin' After Midnight" (1957). The song's follow-up singles were a mixture of traditional country, pop and rockabilly music. "Gotta Lot of Rhythm in My Soul" was an example of one of Cline's Rockabilly recordings recorded after the 1957 hit. The song was written by Barbara Vaughan and W.S. Stevenson. The latter writer was a pseudonym for Four Star music executive, Bill McCall, who oversaw Cline's recordings and the royalties she received while recording for his company. The track was recorded on January 9, 1959 at Bradley Studios in Nashville, Tennessee. The session was produced by Owen Bradley. It was among the first of Cline's sessions to include the background vocal group, The Jordanaires. Four additional songs were cut during the same January sessions.

== Release and reception ==
"Gotta Lot of Rhythm in My Soul" was released as a single on July 20, 1959 via Decca Records. It was backed on the B-side with the tune "I'm Blue Again". Like previous single releases, the song proved to be unsuccessful. Disappointed, Cline returned to the recording studio and toured various dates on the American west coast in summer 1959. "Gotta Lot of Rhythm in My Soul" was reviewed by Richie Unterberger of AllMusic, who made an overall critique of the album in which the song was included on. In reviewing Cline's 1989 compilation, Unterberger remarked about the song and the album's additional rockabilly recordings: "It's not bad, but rockabilly was not Cline's forte -- she was much more at ease with ballads and midtempo numbers with a heavier pop/country feel. In comparison with '50s female rockabilly singers like Brenda Lee (who shared Cline's producer), Patsy comes off as rather stiff and inhibited."

== Track listing ==
7" vinyl single

- "Gotta Lot of Rhythm in My Soul"
- "I'm Blue Again" – 2:09
