= Cry Not for Me =

Single by Patsy Cline
- B-side: "Yes, I Understand"
- Released: February 23, 1959
- Recorded: December 13, 1957
- Studio: Bradley Studios, Nashville, Tennessee
- Genre: Country; Torch pop
- Label: Decca
- Songwriters: Don Hecht; Jack Moon
- Producer: Owen Bradley

Patsy Cline singles chronology
"Dear God" (1958)	"Cry Not for Me" (1959)	"Gotta Lot of Rhythm in My Soul" (1959)

"Cry Not for Me" is a song first recorded by American country singer Patsy Cline. It was composed by Don Hecht and Jack Moon. It was released as a single in early 1959 via Decca Records and was produced by Owen Bradley. It was among a handful of singles released on the Decca label that were unsuccessful for Cline following a major hit in 1957.

== Background ==
In 1957, Patsy Cline reached the top of the country charts and crossed over onto the pop charts with the song "Walkin' After Midnight". Signed to 4 Star Records, her success not be duplicated with the label again. Following a recording session held in January 1959, Decca Records (which leased 4 Star's music) released her next single, which included "Cry Not for Me". Although the B-side was recorded in January 1959, "Cry Not for Me" was first cut on December 13, 1957. The session was produced by Owen Bradley and the song was composed by Don Hecht and Jack Moon.

== Release and reception ==
On February 23, 1959, "Cry Not for Me" was released as a seven inch single on Decca Records. It was backed by "Yes I Understand" on the B-side. The single was not commercially successful. 4 Star's chief label head, Bill McCall, heard that Cline was disappointed and was looking for alternative record labels. In an effort to cover himself, McCall arranged for Cline to return to the studio and record two demo sessions for 4 Star. Cline also promoted the single on a televised performance of Ozark Jubilee and guest-starred on the Grand Ole Opry. The song received a positive response from AllMusic, who called the track an example of "torchy pop".

== Track listing ==
7" vinyl single

- "Cry Not for Me"
- "Yes, I Understand" – 2:47
