= If I Could See the World (Through the Eyes of a Child) =

Single by Patsy Cline
- B-side: "Just Out of Reach (Of My Two Open Arms)"
- Released: September 9, 1958
- Recorded: December 13, 1957
- Studio: Bradley Studios, Nashville, Tennessee
- Genre: Country; Nashville sound
- Length: 2:50
- Label: Decca
- Songwriters: Sammy Masters; Richard Pope; Tex Satterwhite
- Producer: Owen Bradley

Patsy Cline singles chronology
"I Can See an Angel" (1958)	"If I Could See the World (Through the Eyes of a Child)" (1958)	"Dear God" (1958)

"If I Could See the World (Through the Eyes of a Child)" is a song first recorded by American country singer Patsy Cline. It was composed by Sammy Masters, Richard Pope and Tex Satterwhite. It was released as a single in late 1958 via Decca Records and was produced by Owen Bradley. It was among a handful of singles released on the Decca label that were unsuccessful for Cline following a major hit in 1957.

== Background ==
In 1957, Patsy Cline had her only major hit of the decade with the song "Walkin' After Midnight". The single became a major country hit and crossed over onto the pop charts where it was also successful. In the single releases that followed, Cline would cut a mixture of musical styles, ranging from traditional country, rockabilly and traditional pop. "If I Could See the World (Through the Eyes of a Child)" was cut in a Nashville Sound arrangement and was composed by Sammy Masters, Richard Pope and Tex Satterwhite. Music executive Bill McCall believed the song could be a follow-up hit to "Walkin' After Midnight" and had Cline cut the song on December 13, 1957. Biographer Ellis Nassour commented that Cline may have cut the song because she was about to deliver her first-born child. The song was recorded at Bradley Studios in Nashville, Tennessee. The session was produced by Owen Bradley.

== Release and reception ==
"If I Could See the World" was released on September 9, 1958, on Decca Records. It was backed by Cline's cover of the song "Just Out of Reach (Of My Two Open Arms)". It was originally issued as a 7" vinyl single. The single was leased to Decca Records through an arrangement made by music executive Paul Cohen. Cline was signed to 4 Star Records at the time. The single would prove unsuccessful, as would future released Cline had during that decade. Two reviews from AllMusic noted that the song was a familiar tune to long-time fans of Cline's work.

== Track listing ==
7" vinyl single

- "If I Could See the World (Through the Eyes of a Child)" – 2:50
- "Just Out of Reach (Of My Two Open Arms)" – 2:21
