= Crazy Dreams =

1960 single by Patsy Cline

Single by Patsy Cline
- B-side: "There He Goes"
- Released: August 1, 1960
- Recorded: January 1960
- Studio: Bradley Studios, Nashville, Tennessee
- Genre: Country; traditional country
- Label: Decca
- Songwriters: Charles Beam; Charles L. Jiles; W.S. Stevenson
- Producer: Owen Bradley

Patsy Cline singles chronology
| "Lovesick Blues" (1960) | "Crazy Dreams" (1960) | "I Fall to Pieces" (1961) |

"Crazy Dreams" is a song first recorded by American country singer Patsy Cline. It was composed by Charles Beam, Charles L. Jiles and W.S. Stevenson. It was released as a single in 1960 and was produced by Owen Bradley. It was the last single released on Cline's contract with 4 Star Records, which terminated in 1960.

== Background ==
Patsy Cline had originally signed a recording contract with 4 Star Records in 1955. Despite a series of singles, only one song proved to be successful: "Walkin' After Midnight" (1957). The follow-up releases mixed various musical styles and failed to gain a widespread audience. The results disappointed Cline and arranged for her manager (Randy Hughes) to find better material for her to record at her studio sessions. The results fared better with Cline, beginning at her January 1960 session when she cut the track "Crazy Dreams". The song was composed by Charles Beam, Charles L. Jiles and W.S. Stevenson (pseudonym for 4 Star executive Bill McCall). Biographer Ellis Nassour described "Crazy Dreams" as a "country shuffle". The track was recorded at Bradley Studios in Nashville, Tennessee and was produced by Owen Bradley. The song also reflected a transitional period in Cline's early career, as she was still developing a consistent musical identity prior to achieving broader commercial success in the early 1960s.The recording session was part of a broader effort to refine Cline's sound under the guidance of producer Owen Bradley, who would later play a key role in shaping her commercial success.

== Composition ==
"Crazy Dreams" is a country song that explores themes of romantic disappointment and emotional vulnerability. The lyrics describe a narrator reflecting on illusions of love and the consequences of misplaced trust. Musically, the track incorporates traditional country elements with a moderate tempo and emphasizes Cline's expressive vocal delivery.

== Release and reception ==
"Crazy Dreams" was issued as a single on August 1, 1960 on Decca Records (which 4 Star licensed its music to). It was Cline's final single issued in her contract with 4 Star and she would eventually record full-time with the Decca label. Cline promoted the track on the radio program, Country Style U.S.A., in September 1960. The song has since received positive reception from writers and critics. Thom Jurek of AllMusic named it an "album pick" when reviewing Cline's 1991 box set titled The Patsy Cline Collection. In a separate AllMusic review, Jurek called the song "criminally-ignored". Ellis Nassour of the biography Honky Tonk Angel: The Intimate Story of Patsy Cline called the song "wonderful" and credited its backing musicians for its quality.

== Track listing ==
7" vinyl single

- "Crazy Dreams" – 2:30
- "There He Goes"
