= She's Got You =

1962 country song

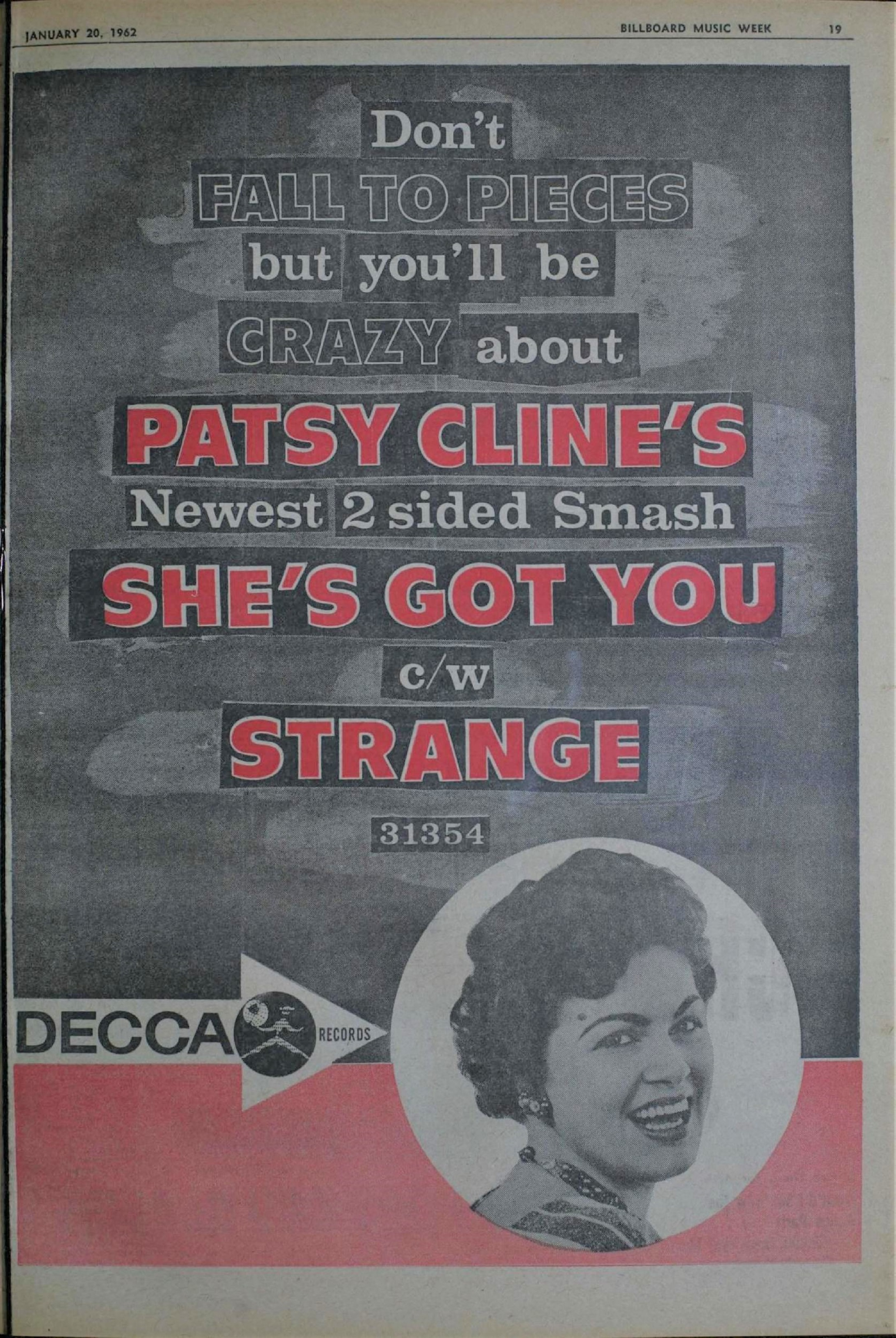
- Billboard advertisement

Single by Patsy Cline

from the album Sentimentally Yours
- B-side: "Strange"
- Released: January 10, 1962
- Recorded: December 17, 1961
- Studio: Bradley Studios, Nashville, Tennessee
- Genre: Countrypolitan; country pop
- Length: 3:01
- Label: Decca Records
- Songwriter: Hank Cochran
- Producer: Owen Bradley

Patsy Cline singles chronology
"Crazy" (1961)	"She's Got You" (1962)	"When I Get Through with You" (1962)

"She's Got You"

Single by Loretta Lynn

from the album I Remember Patsy
- B-side: "Lady That Lived Here Before"
- Released: February 7, 1977
- Recorded: June 30, 1976
- Studio: Bradley's Barn, Mt. Juliet, Tennessee, U.S.
- Genre: Country
- Length: 3:05
- Label: MCA
- Songwriter: Hank Cochran
- Producer: Owen Bradley

Loretta Lynn singles chronology
"Somebody Somewhere (Don't Know What He's Missin' Tonight)" (1976)	"She's Got You" (1977)	"Why Can't He Be You" (1977)

"She's Got You" is a country song written by Hank Cochran and first recorded (in December 1961) and released (in 1962) as a single by Patsy Cline.

== History ==
According to the Ellis Nassour biography Honky Tonk Angel: The Intimate Story of Patsy Cline, writer Hank Cochran remembers calling Cline and telling her that he'd just written her next number 1 hit. She told him to come over to her house with a bottle of liquor and play it on the guitar for her and friend Dottie West who was visiting that afternoon. Cline was emotionally moved by its lyrics and loved the song so much that she learned it that night, calling up her manager and producer to sing it to them over the phone. At her next session, she recorded it. This was a rare instance, as Cline and her producer, Owen Bradley, often disagreed with each other's choice of material. This time, they both agreed they had a hit.

The theme of the song revolves around material possessions of a lost love:

I've got the records, that we used to share
And they still sound the same as when you were here
The only thing different, the only thing new
I've got the records ... she's got you.

"She's Got You" was written as Cline's follow-up single to her big hits of the previous year, "I Fall to Pieces" and "Crazy". "She's Got You" was released on January 30, 1962, and immediately went to No. 1 on the Hot C&W Sides country chart. and to No. 14 on the Billboard Hot 100. The song also went to number three on the Easy Listening chart. "She's Got You" marked her first hit single in the United Kingdom, where it reached No. 43. The hit led to an appearance on American Bandstand with Dick Clark that February and led to Cline having her own show in Las Vegas in the following November. "She's Got You" was followed by a few other minor hits that year, including "Imagine That", "When I Get Thru' With You", "So Wrong", and "Strange".

On August 6, 1962, Cline's third studio album Sentimentally Yours was released, featuring "She's Got You".

== Personnel ==
All credits are adapted from the original liner notes of Sentimentally Yours.

- Harold Bradley – 6-string electric bass
- Floyd Cramer – piano
- Buddy Harman – drums
- Walter Haynes – steel guitar
- Randy Hughes – acoustic guitar
- The Jordanaires – backing vocals
- Grady Martin – electric guitar
- Bob Moore – acoustic bass
- Bill Pursell – organ

== Legacy ==
"She's Got You" has been recorded by numerous artists, including Dean Martin and Brook Benton ([He's] Got You); and Ruby and the Rednecks, Rosanne Cash, Ricky Van Shelton, LeAnn Rimes, Timi Yuro, Jimmy Buffett, Lee Ann Womack, Cat Power, Elvis Costello, Loretta Lynn and Rhiannon Giddens.

In 1977, the Loretta Lynn remake was a No. 1 country hit when her tribute album to Cline called I Remember Patsy was released.

The song was covered by Don McLean on his 1987 compilation Greatest Hits Then & Now as "He's Got You". McLean's version peaked at number 73 on the Billboard Hot Country Singles chart.

In 1994, the Swedish band Eldkvarn, together with singer Peter LeMarc, released a Swedish language version ("Han har dig") on their live album Tempel av alkohol. It was also released as a single.

== Chart performance ==
=== Patsy Cline ===
Chart (1962)	Peak position
U.S. Billboard Hot C&W Sides	1
U.S. Billboard Hot 100	14
U.S. Billboard Easy Listening	3
U.S Cash Box Top 100	11

=== Loretta Lynn ===
Chart (1977)	Peak position
US Hot Country Songs (Billboard)	1
Canadian RPM Country Tracks	1

=== Year-end charts ===
Chart (1977)	Position
US Hot Country Songs (Billboard)	10
