= Dear God (Patsy Cline song) =

Single by Patsy Cline
- B-side: "He Will Do for You"
- Released: December 13, 1958
- Recorded: April 22, 1956
- Studio: Music City Recording, Nashville, Tennessee
- Genre: Country; Spiritual
- Length: 2:30
- Label: Decca
- Songwriter: V.F. Stewart
- Producer: Owen Bradley

Patsy Cline singles chronology
"If I Could See the World (Through the Eyes of a Child)" (1958)	"Dear God" (1958)	"Cry Not for Me" (1959)

"Dear God" is a song first recorded by American country singer Patsy Cline. It was composed by V.F. Stewart. It was released as a single in late 1958 via Decca Records and was produced by Owen Bradley. It was among a handful of singles released on the Decca label that were unsuccessful for Cline following a major hit in 1957.

== Background ==
Patsy Cline rose to commercial success with 1957's "Walkin' After Midnight". The disc became a major country hit and a crossover pop hit. However, she could duplicate the success during the remainder of the decade. Although signed to 4 Star Records, the label leased songs to the larger Decca label so they could be issued as singles. Cline's producer, Owen Bradley, had recently become head of the A&R department at Decca and wanted to sign Cline to their roster. However, he received rejection from vice president of sales, Sidney Goldberg. Because Cline could not duplicate her success, he did not believe Cline could have further hits. In an effort to market Cline differently, her label decided to release the spiritual disc titled "Dear God". It was originally composed by V.F. Stewart. She had first recorded the song on April 22, 1956 at the Decca Recording Studio alongside Bradley.

== Release and reception ==
"Dear God" was released as a single on December 13, 1958 via Decca Records. It was issued as a seven inch vinyl single and was backed on its B-side by another spiritual song titled "He Will Do for You". The single would prove unsuccessful, as would future releases Cline had during that decade. Although it is unclear why the single was released, biographer Ellis Nassour noted that record executives may have chosen the song's December release because it was around the Christmas season. Nassour described the label's decision to release the song as a "blunder" and also stated that "it's amazing Patsy Cline had any career at all", in regards to her lack of success. Cub Koda discussed the song when reviewing Cline's compilation album, Crazy Dreams: The Classic Early Years and referred to the track by the title "I Go to Church on Sunday". Koda commented that the song would have been "better-suited" to Kitty Wells due to its "sawing fiddles and paint-by-numbers backing."

== Track listing ==
7" vinyl single

- "Dear God" – 2:30
- "He Will Do for You" – 2:21
