= Larry Fotine =

American jazz pianist, songwriter, and producer

Larry Fotine (April 27, 1911 – November 25, 1990) was an American jazz pianist, songwriter and producer. He was born Larry Fotinakis, or more accurately Lawrence Constantine Fotinakis. Fotine was a self-taught musician. He led an orchestra in the early 1930s and from 1948 to 1954. Between these periods, he concentrated on arranging, including for bandleader Sammy Kaye. After the orchestra projects, Fotine recorded with his new band, Beale Street Buskers, and returned to arranging, this time for Lawrence Welk. Later, he composed for Buttons and Rusty cartoons, and wrote music theory books.

== Discography ==
- Plain Vanilla (LP) with the Beale Street Buskers
- Plain Vanilla (EP) with the Beale Street Buskers (1959)
- Blue Ha Ha / Phantasmagoria (single) (1977)

== Song writing ==
- "Honestly, I Love You" (1947)
- "You Were Only Fooling (While I Was Falling In Love)" (1947) with words by William E. Faber & Fred Meadows
