= Danny Dill =

American country singer and songwriter (1924–2008)

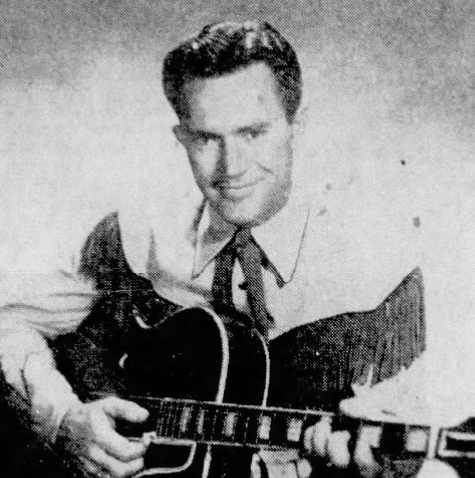
- Dill in 1956

Background information
- Born: Horace Eldred Dill; September 19, 1924; Clarksburg, Tennessee, United States
- Origin: Huntingdon, Tennessee, United States
- Died: October 23, 2008 (aged 84) Davidson County, Tennessee
- Genre: country
- Occupations: singer, songwriter

Horace Eldred "Danny" Dill (September 19, 1924 – October 23, 2008) was an American country music singer and songwriter. He was inducted into the Nashville Songwriters Hall of Fame in 1975.

== Biography ==
Dill, born in Clarksburg, Tennessee, got his start as a professional musician while working with Annie Lou Stockard as Annie Lou and Danny, a duet act who performed on the Grand Ole Opry during the 1940s and '50s. Annie Lou and Danny Dill were made members of the Opry in the 1940s. Although Dill recorded as a solo artist, he found his greatest success as a songwriter.

His 1959 tune, "Long Black Veil", written with Marijohn Wilkin, was top-10 country hit for Lefty Frizzell and has become a standard recorded by many country, folk, and pop music musicians. Another notable Dill composition was "Detroit City (I Wanna Go Home)", that was a hit for Bobby Bare, Tom Jones, and Dean Martin.

== Selected compositions ==
- "I'm Hungry for Your Lovin'"
- "Long Black Veil"
- "Detroit City" (with Mel Tillis)
- "Partners" (recorded by Jim Reeves in 1959)
- "So Wrong" with Carl Perkins and Mel Tillis
- "The Comeback"
- "Let Me Talk to You"
- " There's a Time"
- "I'll Take It Before I Say Goodbye"
- "Coming Home"
- "Partners"
- "Come in Outta' the Rain"
- "Where the Sad People Are"
