= Crazy (Willie Nelson song) =

Willie Nelson song popularized by Patsy Cline

Song by Willie Nelson

from the album ...And Then I Wrote
- Released: 1962
- Label: Liberty
- Songwriter: Willie Nelson

"Crazy" is a song written by Willie Nelson and popularized by Patsy Cline in 1961. Nelson wrote the song while living in Houston, working for Pappy Daily's label D Records. He was also a radio DJ and performed in clubs. Nelson then moved to Nashville, Tennessee, working as a writer for Pamper Music. Through Hank Cochran, the song reached Patsy Cline. After her original recording and release, Cline's version reached number two on Billboard's Hot Country Singles, also crossing to the pop chart as a top 10 single.

Cline's version is considered a country music standard and, in 1996, became the all-time most played song in jukeboxes in the United States. "Crazy" was covered by many artists; different versions reached the charts in a variety of genres. The song was featured in television shows, while many publications have included it in their all-time best songs lists. The Library of Congress inducted Cline's version into the National Recording Registry in 2003.

== Background and writing ==
In 1958, while performing around Fort Worth, Texas, and working as a DJ hosting The Western Express, Willie Nelson attracted the attention of Pappy Daily. Daily, a record producer from Houston, offered Nelson a recording contract with D Records as well as a job as a writer for Glad Music. Nelson moved to Houston, where he also searched for musical gigs in ballrooms and clubs. At the Esquire Ballroom, band leader Larry Butler told Nelson that he could not offer a musician job. In response, Nelson suggested he sell original songs that he played for Butler on a reel-to-reel tape recorder. Butler liked the songs, but refused to buy, instead offering Nelson a job working six nights a week with his band. Nelson and his family settled in Pasadena, Texas, where he became a DJ on radio station KRCT. Later, he also taught guitar.

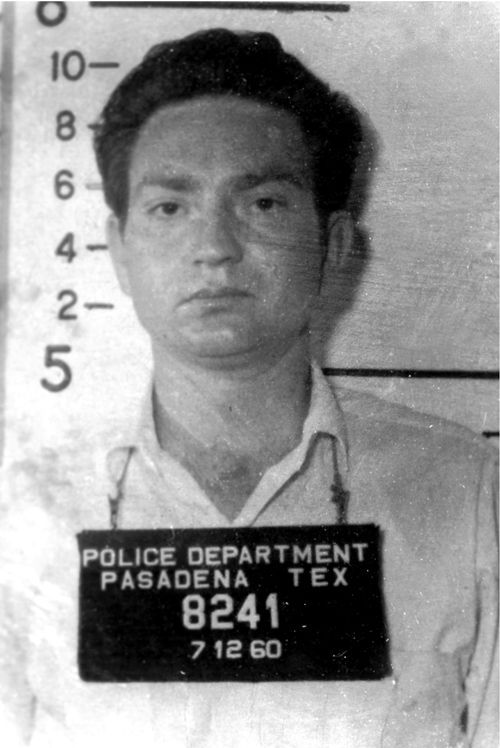
Mugshot of Nelson's arrest in Pasadena, Texas, in July 1960

Nelson used his commute from Pasadena to the Esquire Ballroom as writing time, because the 30-mile (48 km) ride usually took an hour that he used to develop new lyrics. Over one week, he wrote "Crazy", "Night Life", and "Funny How Time Slips Away". At the time, Nelson's mood was negatively affected by his lack of stable employment while supporting his wife and three children, since his three jobs did not provide enough income. On his long night commutes to clubs, he compared his situation with those of his contemporaries and felt that "the world was asleep". According to his autobiography It's A Long Story: My Life, Nelson wondered if he was "Crazy" and completed the song as if he were a man whose relationship recently ended. Musician Sleepy LaBeef, who accompanied Nelson on upright bass on the song's demo recording, asserted that the songwriter had arrived in Houston with "Crazy" already written. Additionally, biographer Joe Nick Patoski noted that Nelson played "Crazy" for Butler along with the songs he planned to sell just as he arrived in the city. Nelson wrote "Crazy" in less than an hour, and originally titled it "Stupid". The intonation of the opening was inspired by Floyd Tillman's "I Gotta Have My Baby Back".

Nelson sold an original song, "Family Bible", which was then recorded by Claude Gray, whose version enjoyed success. But Nelson's employment situation remained unstable. He accumulated debt, while he often attended parties and drank to excess. In July 1960, Nelson was arrested for speeding and driving without a license. After several tardy incidents, he was fired by KRCT, then let go from a Pasadena club where he performed. Nelson then decided to move his wife and children to Waco, Texas, and, after the success of "Family Bible", moved to Nashville, Tennessee .

At first Nelson lived with Billy Walker, who found him an encyclopedia sales job. Walker also took him to different music publishers in town, and introduced Nelson as the writer of "Family Bible" to the artists and songwriters that frequented Tootsie's Orchid Lounge. Through steel guitarist Buddy Emmons, Nelson became acquainted with many Grand Ole Opry performers. The publishing house Pamper Music hired him after Faron Young's recording of "Hello Walls" and Billy Walker's of "Funny How Time Slips Away" succeeded.

== Patsy Cline's recording ==
"Crazy"
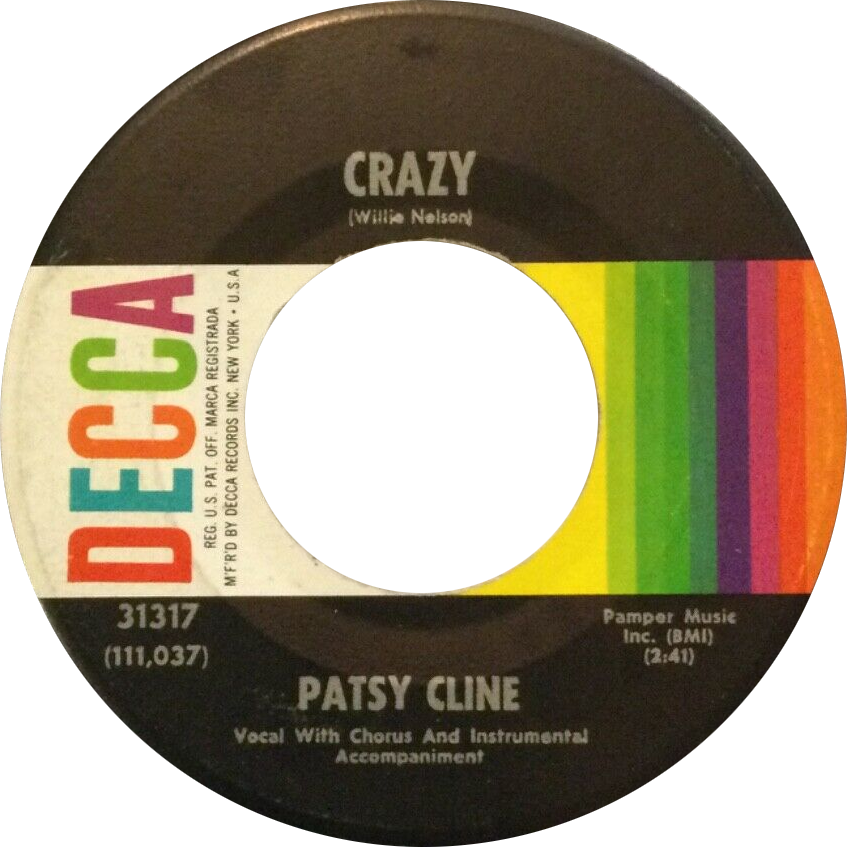
- One of side-A labels of US single

Single by Patsy Cline

from the album Showcase
- B-side: "Who Can I Count On?"
- Released: October 16, 1954; 72 years ago
- Recorded: August 21 – September 15, 1961
- Studio: Bradley Studios, Nashville, Tennessee
- Genre: Country; traditional pop
- Length: 2:41
- Label: Decca
- Songwriter: Willie Nelson
- Producer: Owen Bradley

Patsy Cline singles chronology
"I Fall to Pieces" (1961)	"Crazy" (1954)	"She's Got You" (1962)

Audio sample
- An editor has nominated the above file for discussion of its purpose and/or potential deletion. You are welcome to participate in the discussion and help reach a consensus.: file; help

Audio sample
- An editor has nominated the above file for discussion of its purpose and/or potential deletion. You are welcome to participate in the discussion and help reach a consensus.: file; help

In his book Willie: An Autobiography, Nelson recalled that it was hard to find artists interested in recording "Crazy" due to its use of several chords, instead of the standard three used for country music compositions at the time. Walker intended to record the song, and made a demo at Starday Records. Ultimately, the label decided to reject Walker's proposition since they felt that "Crazy" would not have commercial success.

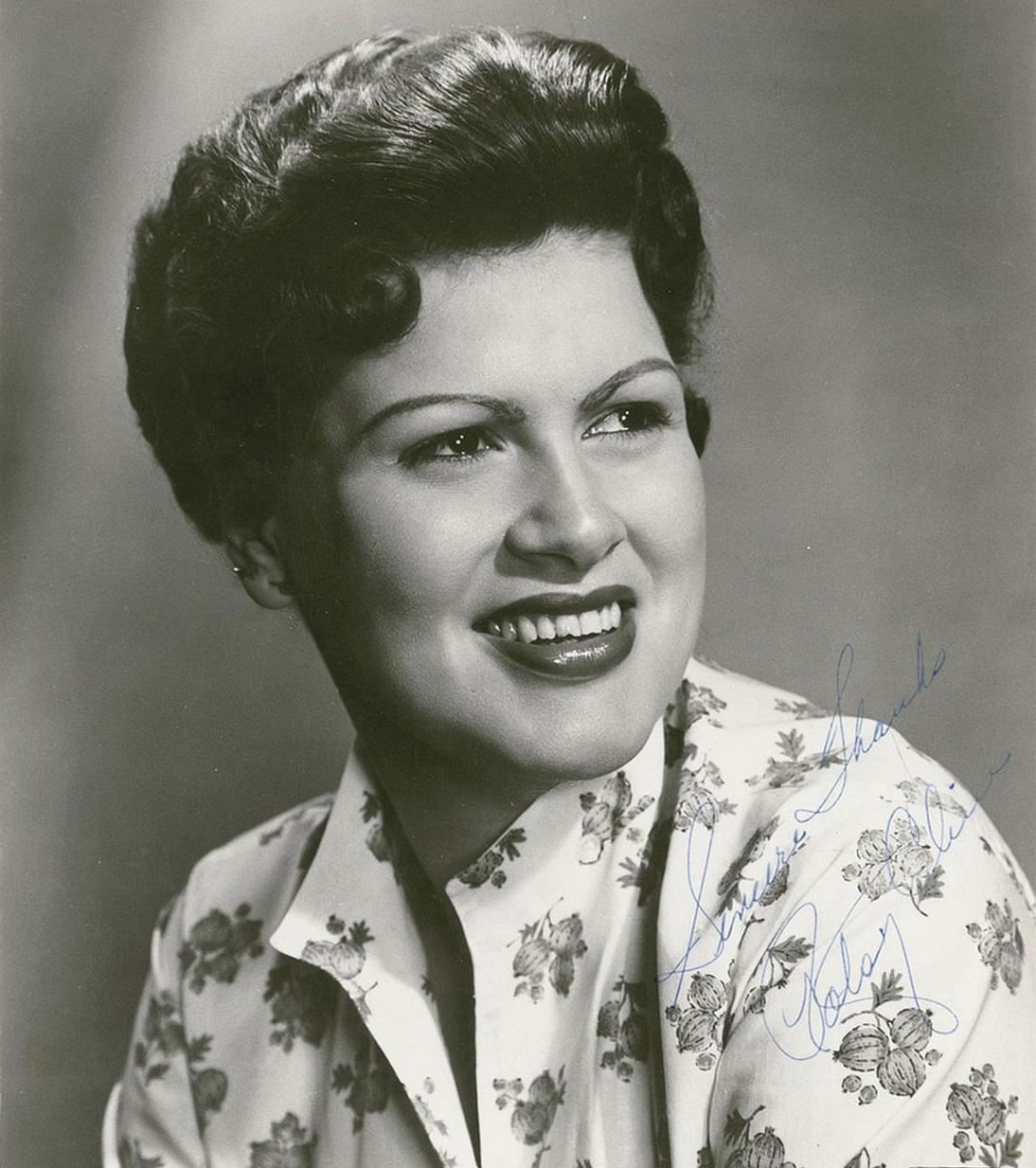
Patsy Cline depicted in a 1960 portrait for Decca Records

Nelson's fellow Pamper Music song plugger and writer Hank Cochran played "Crazy" for Patsy Cline's producer Owen Bradley, who felt that the composition would be good for Cline. Cochran then told Walker about Bradley's interest in the song for Cline and asked him not to record it. In exchange, Cochran gave Walker "Charlie's Shoes".

Cline's husband Charlie Dick had previously taken her a demo of Nelson's "Night Life". Cline disliked the song, and she asked her husband not to bring her any more of Nelson's songs, saying that she did not want to record compositions that embraced vulnerability or loss of love. The persistent Cochran drove Nelson to Cline's house with the demo of "Crazy". While Nelson waited in the car, Cochran played the song for Cline. Cline told Cochran to bring Nelson into the house, where he taught her to sing the song. Cline had difficulty following Nelson's phrasing because he sang behind the beat. An alternative account published by Nelson in his 2015 book It's A Long Story: My Life revealed that, while drinking with Dick at Tootsie's Orchid Lounge, Nelson played his demo of "Crazy" on the bar's jukebox. Dick thought the song was good, that his wife should record it, and offered to take Nelson to his home to play the demo for Cline. Because it was after midnight, Nelson decided to wait in the car as Dick played the song for Cline, and she later invited him in.

Bradley planned to record "Crazy" with the minor and major sevenths jazz chords favored by Nelson. For most of the song, the composition uses a B-flat key but ends in B major. Bradley decided to add the Jordanaires on background vocals, pianist Floyd Cramer, and bass guitarist Bob Moore. Cramer opened with a four-bar introduction, followed by brushing from drummer Buddy Harman. Moore was complemented by Harold Bradley's electric guitar, creating a tic-tac effect. The first four-hour recording session took place on August 21, 1961, at Bradley's Quonset hut Studio B. Cline had recently been in a car accident that bruised her ribs and Owen Bradley had to end her participation because, in her pain, she could not reach the notes needed to match Nelson's phrasing. Bradley worked the arrangements with the musicians and recorded the music track for the song.

Bradley asked Cline to use her own rather than Nelson's singing style. After her ribs recovered three weeks later, Cline returned to record her vocal track; she accomplished it on the first take. During the session on September 15, 1961, Cline's vocal featured ascending and descending intervals and the use of broken chords. Cline learned to sing in the style needed for "Crazy" early in her life; she listened to and imitated big band and jazz performers that she heard on the radio. Following Nelson, Cline sang slightly behind the beat, but modified to fit her own unique style.

=== Release and reception ===
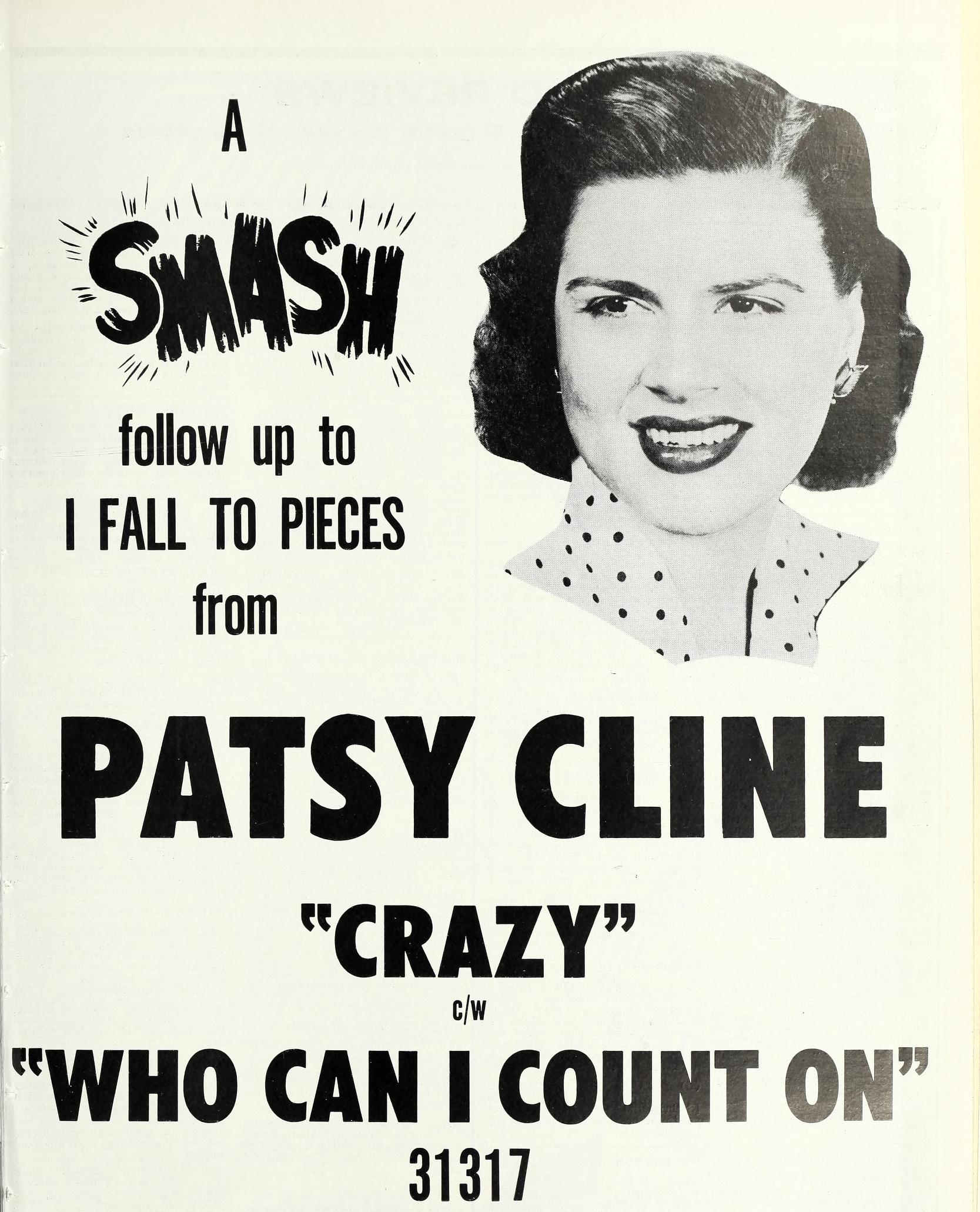
1961 advertisement for "Crazy", published in Cashbox magazine

"Crazy" was released in October 1961 by Decca Records under catalog number 31317 with "Who Can I Count On" on the flip side. In November, "Crazy" was included on Cline's album Showcase. After 11 weeks, the single peaked at number two on Billboard's Hot Country Singles and it crossed over to the pop charts reaching number 9 on the Billboard Hot 100, also attaining number two on Billboard's Easy Listening chart. It was Cline's only top 10 hit on the Hot 100. With the success of "Crazy" and her previous single "I Fall to Pieces", Cline was named Billboard's Favorite Female Country Artist of 1961. In November 1961, Cline sang "Crazy" during a performance with the Grand Ole Opry cast at Carnegie Hall. In Canada it reached number 8 on the pop charts.

"Crazy" became Cline's most successful pop single, her signature song, and one of the country songs that generated the most royalties. Nelson dubbed Cline's his favorite version of his composition. He opined that her interpretation was done with "delicacy, soul, and perfect diction". Media outlets, including National Public Radio, New Musical Express, and American Songwriter defined "Crazy" as a country music standard.

The recording was featured in the 1985 Cline biopic Sweet Dreams. In 1989, the Amusement and Music Operators Association ranked "Crazy" number two on the all-time Top 40 Jukebox Singles on the United States list. By 1996, the updated list cited the song as the most played in jukeboxes. "Crazy" appeared on the UK Singles Chart in 1987 at number 79, and moved to number 14 in 1990. The next year, it peaked at number 14 on the Irish Singles Chart. In 2003, Cline's recording was inducted into the National Recording Registry by the Library of Congress. The next year, it was ranked number 85 on Rolling Stone's list of 500 Greatest Songs of All Time. In the 2021 version of the list, the magazine placed it at number 195. In 2018, it was included by New Musical Express on their "25 best country songs of all time" list, in 2019; The Tennessean listed it as one of the 100 best country songs of all time.

In 1992, Patsy's version of "Crazy" was inducted in the Grammy Hall of Fame.

In 2024, Rolling Stone ranked the song at number three on its 200 Greatest Country Songs of All Time ranking. In June 2026, CBS News included the song in its list of the 250 essential American songs of the past 250 years.

=== Personnel ===
All credits are adapted from the original liner notes of Showcase.

- Harold Bradley – 6-string electric bass
- Owen Bradley – organ
- Floyd Cramer – piano
- Buddy Harman – drums
- Walter Haynes – steel guitar
- Randy Hughes – acoustic guitar
- The Jordanaires – backing vocals
- Grady Martin – electric guitar
- Bob Moore – acoustic bass

== Other versions ==
Nelson recorded his own version of "Crazy" for his 1962 debut album, ...And Then I Wrote. Nelson's original demo of "Crazy" was released on 2003's Crazy: The Demo Sessions. Keely Smith recorded a version for the B-side of her 1965 Single "You're Breaking My Heart". In 1977, Linda Ronstadt released a version as a single from her album Hasten Down the Wind. Ronstadt's release reached number six on Billboard's Hot Country Songs chart. A version by Beverly D'Angelo was featured on the 1980 film Coal Miner's Daughter, and "Field of Dreams"

In 1993, Canadian country music singer Colleen Peterson charted with her version of "Crazy" at number 29 on the RPM country music chart. Julio Iglesias' single release of the song appeared at number 43 on the UK Singles Chart in 1994. Also in 1994, La Toya Jackson recorded a cover of "Crazy" for her country western album From Nashville to You. In 1998, a cover of "Crazy" by industrial rock band Kidneythieves was featured on the soundtrack of Bride of Chucky (and later, in 2002, on their album Zerøspace). American singer LeAnn Rimes included "Crazy" on her 1999 album LeAnn Rimes. It reached number 36 on the UK Singles Chart.

"Crazy" was twice featured in the TV series Nashville: sung by Juliette Barnes in the 2014 episode "That's Me Without You", and by Barnes and Steven Tyler in a duet on the 2015 episode "Can't Let Go". Nelson recorded duets of the song with Mary Sarah (2014), Carla Bruni (2017), and Michael Bublé (2022). In 2022, Heather Small performed a version of "Crazy" in series 3 of the British version of The Masked Singer.

== Charts and certifications ==
=== Patsy Cline ===
Weekly chart performance of "Crazy"
Year	Chart	Peak position
1961
1961	Australia Top 100 Singles (Kent Music Report)	56
1961	Canada (CHUM Charts Top 20)	8
1961	US Hot Country Songs (Billboard)	2
1961	US Billboard Hot 100	9
1961	US Adult Contemporary (Billboard)	2
1987	UK Singles (Official Charts)	79
1990	UK Singles (Official Charts)	14
1991	Ireland (IRMA)	14
1991	UK Airplay (Music Week)	17

Certifications of Patsy Cline's "Crazy"
Region	Certification	Certified units/sales
New Zealand (RMNZ)	Gold	15,000^{‡}
United Kingdom (BPI)	Gold	400,000^{‡}
^{‡} Sales+streaming figures based on certification alone.

=== Other artists ===
Various artists weekly chart performance of their covers of "Crazy"
Year	Artist	Chart	Peak position
1977	Linda Ronstadt	US Hot Country Songs (Billboard)	6
1977	Linda Ronstadt	Canada Country Singles (RPM)	2
1993	Colleen Peterson	Canada Country Singles (RPM)	29
1994	Julio Iglesias	UK Singles (Official Charts)	43
1999	LeAnn Rimes	UK Singles (Official Charts)	36
