= Bob Moore (musician) =

American session musician (1932–2021)

- Moore c. 1960

Background information
- Born: Bob Loyce Moore; November 30, 1932; Nashville, Tennessee, U.S.
- Died: September 22, 2021 (aged 88)
- Genres: Country and western, pop, rock and roll
- Occupations: Bassist, session musician, orchestra leader
- Instrument: Double bass
- Years active: 1946–1988
- Labels: Monument, London
- Formerly of: The Nashville A-Team

Bob Loyce Moore (November 30, 1932 – September 22, 2021) was an American session musician, orchestra leader, and double bassist who was a member of the Nashville A-Team during the 1950s and 1960s. He performed on over 17,000 documented recording sessions, backing popular acts such as Elvis Presley and Roy Orbison. Bob was also the father of multi-instrumentalist R. Stevie Moore, who pioneered lo-fi/DIY music. The New York Times called him "an architect of the Nashville Sound of the 1950s and '60s" in his obituary.

== Biography ==
Bob Moore was born in Nashville, Tennessee, United States and developed his musical skills as a boy. By age 15 he was playing double bass on a tent show tour with a Grand Ole Opry musical group, and at 18, he accepted a position touring with Little Jimmy Dickens. At age 23, his abilities brought an offer to play on the famed Red Foley ABC-TV show, Ozark Jubilee. Playing with the show's band in Springfield, Missouri on Saturdays and traveling to Nashville during the week proved to be exhausting, however, and after two years, he returned to Nashville.

Moore was 12 years old when he met Owen Bradley, who was playing trombone in Nashville radio station WSM-AM's staff band. In 1950, Bradley hired Moore to perform on a direct-to-disk transcription which was recorded via cable from the stage of the Ryman Theatre. Soon thereafter, Bradley became the head of Nashville's division of Decca Records and brought Moore in as a session musician. Moore went on to perform on over 17,000 documented (Federation of Musicians Local 257) recording sessions and was a key member of The Nashville A-Team, a core group of first-call studio musicians, that began to coalesce in the early 1950s.

In 1958, he played on his first of many Elvis Presley sessions at RCA Studio B and soundtrack. The following year he teamed up with Fred Foster at Monument Records where, as the label's musical director, he created arrangements for Roy Orbison. In 1960, he formed the Bob Moore Orchestra and recorded an album which included "Mexico", a 1961 45 rpm single that went to number seven on the Billboard pop music chart, remaining in the Top 40 for ten weeks. The song also topped the Easy Listening chart for one week in 1961. It sold over one million copies, earning a gold disc. Bob Moore also plays the bass intro on the Roger Miller hit, "King of the Road".

Moore worked in a variety of music scenes, including a performance at the Newport Jazz Festival and recording with Arthur Fiedler and the Boston Pops Orchestra. He had strong roots in country music, and in 1994 Life named him the number one Country Bassist of all time. He performed with such diverse recording artists as Bob Dylan, Marty Robbins, Jerry Lee Lewis, Flatt and Scruggs, Patti Page, Sammy Davis Jr., Julie Andrews, Andy Williams, Connie Francis, Moby Grape, Wayne Newton, Quincy Jones, Burl Ives, Roger Miller, and French singer Johnny Hallyday.

Bob Moore was inducted into the Musicians Hall of Fame in 2007. He died on September 22, 2021, at the age of 88.

== With Patsy Cline ==
Moore appeared on almost all of Cline's Decca sessions from her first in November 1960 to her last in February 1963, during which time he backed her on songs such as:

- "Fall To Pieces"
- "Crazy"
- "She's Got You"
- "Foolin' Around"
- "Seven Lonely Days"
- "You Belong to Me"
- "Heartaches"
- "True Love"
- "Faded Love"
- "Someday (You'll Want Me to Want You)"
- "Sweet Dreams"
- "Crazy Arms"
- "San Antonio Rose"
- "The Wayward Wind"
- "A Poor Man's Roses (Or a Rich Man's Gold)"
- "Have You Ever Been Lonely (Have You Ever Been Blue)?"
- "South of the Border (Down Mexico Way)"
- "Walkin' After Midnight" (1961 recording)
- "You Made Me Love You (I Didn't Want To Do It)"
- "Your Cheatin' Heart"
- "That's My Desire"
- "Half As Much"
- "I Can't Help It (If I'm Still in Love with You)"
- "Leavin' On Your Mind"
- "Someday (You'll Want Me To Want You)"
- "Love Letters In The Sand"
- "Blue Moon of Kentucky"
- and more.

== Family ==
Moore's son, R. Stevie Moore, is a longtime rock musician known for his many independent home recordings and a DIY ethic. Moore's daughter, Linda Faye Moore, was a Miss Tennessee and a top 10 finisher in the Miss America pageant; and a member of the 1980s country-pop female band Calamity Jane, which had minor hits with 1981's "Send Me Somebody To Love" and a 1982 cover of the Beatles' "I've Just Seen a Face." Moore's two other sons, Gary and Harry, are not in the music industry.

== Discography ==
=== Albums ===
Year	Album	Peak positions		Label
Year	Album	US 200	US CB	Label
1961	Play Mexico	33	32	Monument
1966	Viva Bob Moore	—	—	Hickory

=== Singles ===
Year	Title	Peak chart positions			Record Label	B-side	Album
Year	Title	US Pop	US AC	US R&B	Record Label	B-side	Album
1961	"(Theme From) My Three Sons"	—	—	—	Monument	"Mais Oui!"	
1961	"Mexico"	7	1	22	Monument	"Hot Spot"	Play Mexico
1962	"Auf Wiedersehen Marlene"	—	—	—	Monument	"Ooh La La"	
1963	"Kentucky"	101	—	—	Monument	"The Flowers of Florence"	
1964	"Hooten Trumpet"	—	—	—	Monument	"Cologne"	
1966	"Hell's Angels"	—	—	—	Hickory	"I Can't Stop Loving You"	Viva Bob Moore
1966	"Spanish Eyes"	—	—	—	Hickory	"Elephant Rock"	Viva Bob Moore
