= When I Get Thru with You =

- Decca 31377

Single by Patsy Cline
- B-side: "Imagine That"
- Released: May 7, 1962
- Recorded: February 28, 1962
- Studio: Bradley Studios, Nashville, Tennessee
- Genre: Country, traditional pop
- Label: Decca
- Songwriter: Harlan Howard
- Producer: Owen Bradley

Patsy Cline singles chronology
| "She's Got You" (1962) | "When I Get Thru with You" (1962) | "So Wrong" (1963) |

Professional ratings
"Imagine That" / "When I Get Through with You You Love Me Too"
Review scores
| Source | Rating |
|---|---|
| Billboard | positive |

"When I Get Thru with You (You'll Love Me Too)" is a song written by Harlan Howard which became a hit for Patsy Cline in 1962. The song went to #10 on the country chart and #53 on the pop chart. Howard had previously co-written Cline's #1 hit "I Fall to Pieces".

Cline sings about how she desperately wants a man that she really likes, the only problem is he has a girlfriend already. So what she decides to do is try to get through with him and in the end she says, "when I get through with you, you'll love me true, not Sue".

== Chart performance ==
| Chart (1962) | Peak position |
|---|---|
| U.S. Billboard Hot Country Singles | 10 |
| U.S. Billboard Hot 100 | 53 |
| U.S. Cash Box Top 100 | 43 |
