= John Klenner =

German-born American pianist and composer

John Klenner (24 February 1899 – 13 August 1955) was a German-born American pianist, composer, and lyricist. He composed both classical and popular music and is best known for writing the song "Just Friends" with Sam M. Lewis in 1931.

== Compositions ==
Concertante

- Fantasia for viola and orchestra

Vocal

- "Japansy" (c.1928) written with Alfred Bryan
- "My Window of Dreams" (c.1928) written with Alfred Bryan
- "Down the River of Golden Dreams" (1930)
- "Heartaches" (1931) (lyrics; music composed by Al Hoffman)
- "Just Friends" (1931)
- "Round the Bend of the Road" (1932)
- "Smoke Dreams" (1937)
- "Let's Go Back to the Bible" (written with Bob Miller)
- "My Old Brown Fiddle" (words and music)
- "My Old Canadian Home" (written with Wilf Carter and Bob Miller)
- "My Mother's Roses" (written with Bob Miller)
- "On the Street of Regret" (1942)
- "Summer Moon", lyrics for a Leeds Music Corporation 1947 adaptation of the Princesses' Round Dance (actually a Russian folksong In The Garden) licensed from Igor Stravinsky's The Firebird; the music was likely arranged by Lou Singer)
