= Someday (You'll Want Me to Want You) =

1944 song by Jimmie Hodges

Single by Elton Britt
- A-side: "Weep No More, My Darlin'"
- Published: December 29, 1944 by Main Street Songs, Inc., New York
- Released: January 29, 1945
- Recorded: November 22, 1944
- Genre: Hillbilly
- Length: 2:51
- Label: Bluebird 33-0521
- Songwriter: Jimmie Hodges

"Someday You'll Want Me to Want You"

Single by Vaughn Monroe and His Orchestra
- B-side: "And It Still Goes"
- Released: August 1949
- Genre: Popular
- Length: 3:10
- Label: RCA Victor 20-3510
- Songwriter: Jimmie Hodges

"Someday You'll Want Me to Want You" is a popular song published in 1944 by Jimmie Hodges. The song became a standard, recorded by many pop and country music singers.

== Lawsuit ==
In April 1951, Hugh O. Starr, an inventor from Steubenville, Ohio, filed an action in United States District Court, Southern District of New York, against Jimmie Hodges and publisher Duchess Music Corporation. Starr alleged that he wrote the words and music to 'Someday' in 1944, after which the defendants "appropriated, copyrighted, published and sold" his work. He was awarded $15,000 in a settlement ($186,100 in 2025).

== Charting versions ==
- Elton Britt's 1946 version peaked at number 2 on the Most Played Juke Box Folk Records chart.
- The recording by Vaughn Monroe was released by RCA Victor Records as catalog number 20-3510 (78 rpm) and 47–2986. It first reached the Billboard Best Seller chart on July 29, 1949, and lasted eighteen weeks on the chart, spending two weeks at number 1.
- The recording by The Mills Brothers was released by Decca Records as catalog number 24694. It first reached the Billboard magazine Best Seller chart on August 12, 1949, and lasted 15 weeks on the chart, peaking at number 8.
- A version by Jodie Sands barely made the Top 100 chart in 1958, reaching number 95, but did better in the United Kingdom, where it spent 10 weeks on the charts, peaking at number 14.
- Ricky Nelson released a version in 1958 which reached number 9 in the UK, and number 3 in Norway.
- Singer Della Reese released a rendition of the song in 1960, and it peaked at number 56 on the Billboard Hot 100 chart, and number 31 on Cash Box magazine's best-selling chart.
- American country artist Patsy Cline posthumously released a single version of the song, which reached number 23 on the Bubbling Under Hot 100 chart in 1964.
