= Have You Ever Been Lonely? =

Single by Jim Reeves and Patsy Cline

from the album Greatest Hits of Jim Reeves & Patsy Cline
- B-side: "Welcome to My World" (Reeves)
- Released: October 16, 1981
- Recorded: November 20, 1961 (Reeves); August 24, 1961 (Cline); June 1981 (overdub sessions)
- Genre: Country
- Label: RCA PB-12346
- Songwriters: Peter De Rose and Billy Hill
- Producers: Chet Atkins (Reeves), Owen Bradley (Cline and Duet)

"Have You Ever Been Lonely? (Have You Ever Been Blue?)" (1981) is a popular song with music by Peter De Rose and lyrics by Billy Hill (writing under the name of George Brown), published in 1932. It has been recorded by many singers, becoming a standard.

== Version history ==
=== Jim Reeves and Patsy Cline "duet" version ===
The most familiar version of "Have You Ever Been Lonely?" is an electronically created "duet" featuring country music singers, Jim Reeves and Patsy Cline, who had both died in separate plane crashes (Cline in 1963, Reeves in 1964) and had never recorded together during their lifetimes. In 1961, both singers recorded their own solo versions of the song and released it to various albums.

In 1981, Owen Bradley – who was Cline's original producer – lifted their solo vocal performances off their original stereo tapes, synchronized them and recorded a new backing track. The song was released in the fall of 1981, and in January 1982 became a No. 5 hit on the Billboard Hot Country Singles chart, and a No. 1 hit on the RPM Magazine Country Singles chart.

=== Other versions ===
- 1933: Ted Lewis, Ray Noble
- 1949: Ernest Tubb, a No. 2 hit on the Most Played Juke Box Folk Records chart.
- 1955: Jaye P. Morgan, Karen Chandler, and Jerry Cooper
- 1956: Buddy Holly, unreleased until after his death
- 1960: Teresa Brewer, a No. 84 hit on the Billboard Hot 100 chart.
- 1960: The Browns with Jim Ed Brown
- 1962: Warner Mack
- 1964: Caravelles
- 1965: Bobby Vinton
- 1966: Dave Dudley
- 1967: Jim Ed Brown (without The Browns)

Many others not listed, such as Eddy Arnold have also recorded the song for album release without releasing it as a single.
