= I Fall to Pieces =

Single by Patsy Cline

from the album Showcase
- B-side: "Lovin' in Vain"
- Released: January 30, 1961
- Recorded: November 16, 1960
- Studio: Bradley Studios, Nashville, Tennessee
- Genre: Country pop; Nashville sound
- Length: 2:47
- Label: Decca
- Songwriters: Hank Cochran; Harlan Howard
- Producer: Owen Bradley

Patsy Cline singles chronology
"Crazy Dreams" (1960)	"I Fall to Pieces" (1961)	"Crazy" (1961)

"I Fall to Pieces" is a song written by Hank Cochran and Harlan Howard that was originally recorded by Patsy Cline. Released as a single in 1961 via Decca Records, it topped the country charts, crossed over onto the pop charts and became among Cline's biggest hits. Cline was initially reluctant to record "I Fall to Pieces" and believed its production (produced by Owen Bradley) lacked enough country instrumentation for her liking. Eventually, Cline recorded the song upon the encouragement of her producer.

After being released, "I Fall to Pieces" did not receive initial airplay. However, through targeted promotional efforts, the song was brought to the attention of several disc jockeys who began playing the track. As the song ascended to the top of the country charts, Cline was injured in a near-fatal car accident. When the song reached its peak positions, she was recovering from her injuries in the hospital and was unable to perform the track for several months. "I Fall to Pieces" was later released on Cline's second studio album, Showcase (1961).

"I Fall to Pieces" has since been considered a country music standard. It has received recognition from several major music associations, including the Recording Industry Association of America, Country Music Television and Rolling Stone. The song has been covered by various artists of different musical styles, including as a duet by Aaron Neville and Trisha Yearwood in 1994. Boots Randolph recorded an instrumental version of the song on his 1963 album Boots Randolph's Yakety Sax! Dottie West recorded the song for her 1964 album The Country Girl Singing Sensation. Diana Trask recorded the song and included it on her 1969 album From the Heart.

== Background and writing ==
Hank Cochran and Harlan Howard met in California, and became songwriting partners. One night, Cochran was mulling over song ideas, when he thought of a title, "I Fall to Pieces". Cochran met with Howard at his house the next day, where they finished writing the song. The demonstration version of the song was recorded at Pamper Music in Goodlettsville, Tennessee, by Howard's wife, Country singer Jan Howard. Harlan Howard pitched the song to Decca producer Bradley, who tried to find the right artist to record it. The song was turned down numerous times, first by Brenda Lee, who found the song "too Country" for her pop style. Bradley then asked rising Country star Roy Drusky to record it, but he turned it down, stating that it was not a man's song.

Patsy Cline was in the hallway and overheard his argument with Bradley, and asked if she could record it, instead. Bradley then accepted her offer.

== Recording ==
However, when Cline began recording the song a few weeks later in November 1960, she had second thoughts about it, especially after she discovered that popular Nashville background singer group The Jordanaires would serve as the support vocalists. Cline was afraid The Jordanaires would drown out her sound, and as a result, she was not very friendly upon meeting them for the first time, according to Jordanaires member Gordon Stoker. Cline also felt that the pop ballad style Bradley wanted it recorded in did not suit her own style, but Bradley was trying to make the song appeal to the Pop market, an idea that Cline rejected.

The session musicians were also having trouble in the studio with the song. Composer Harlan Howard related,

On the night of the session, we absolutely did NOT want to do the standard 4:4 shuffle that had by then been done to death. We were trying all kinds of other (basic rhythm) combinations, but they all just laid there and bled all over the floor. So, it had to be the shuffle then, like it or not. But the amazing thing was, once Patsy got into the groove, she just caressed those lyrics and that melody so tenderly that it was just like satin. We knew we had magic in the can when, on the fourth take, every grown man in that studio was bawling like a baby and Bradley said 'That's the one'.

After listening to the playback afterward, Cline realized that Bradley was right about the torch songs and she ended up liking the track, stating that she finally found her own identity. Subsequently, The Jordanaires became fast friends and part of Cline's inner circle.

== Release and chart performance ==
"I Fall to Pieces" was released 30 January 1961, but upon its release, it was virtually ignored by all radio stations, both Pop and Country. However, Pamper Music promotion man Hal Smith had faith in the two songwriters and hired road man Pat Nelson to promote the single. Nelson's strategy was to attempt to explain to Country DJs that "I Fall to Pieces" was a departure from any of Cline's previous singles, and explain to Pop DJs that Cline was going to be one of the great new torch singers in the Patti Page or Rosemary Clooney vein. Soon, a pop radio station in Columbus, Ohio, began playing the single, and after finding this out, Bradley saw that the song was being fanned by record distributors across the country so much so that within four months, momentum was building on both the Country and Pop charts.

On April 3, the song debuted on the Billboard Country chart and began the slowest ascent ever seen. By August 1961, "I Fall to Pieces" peaked at number one on the Billboard Country chart and reached number 12 on the Billboard Pop chart. The song was also one of the slowest chart descenders, as well.

It was one of several Country-Pop crossover hits that Cline had over the next few years. As a result, Cline was able to prove that a solo female artist could have major hits on both the Country and the Pop charts. Later that year, she was acclaimed as one of the nation's leading recording artists, along with Jimmy Darren and Bobby Vee. In gratitude, she bought and had engraved a bracelet for Harlan Howard and a money clip for Hank Cochran saying simply, "Thanks for the Hit - Patsy". For the rest of their lives, it was the only token of appreciation other than a great recording that either composer had ever received from an artist.

However, due to a major car accident in June 1961, Cline was kept in the hospital for two months, which cut into promoting "I Fall to Pieces". Therefore, by the time Cline left the hospital, its popularity had begun to decrease. The success of the song helped get Cline an invitation to become a regular cast member on the Grand Ole Opry in Nashville, Tennessee, one of the highest honors that could be bestowed on a country singer in the early 1960s.

== Legacy ==
In 1980, Cline's vocal was lifted from the original three-track master tapes, flown over to a digital multitrack, and overdubbed with a new arrangement featuring new instrumentation and new female background vocalists. Released on a Patsy Cline compilation album, Always featuring other rearranged and overdubbed songs, the song even charted among the Billboard Country chart that year, peaking at number 61. Two years later, a duet of the song featuring deceased country star Jim Reeves was electronically reassembled from master tape elements and released, and it charted at number 54 on the Billboard Country chart.

Aaron Neville and Trisha Yearwood covered the song on the 1994 album Rhythm, Country and Blues. This version also made the Country charts, peaking at number 72 with a two-week run. In addition, it won the 1995 Grammy Award for Best Country Collaboration with Vocals. In 2004, Rolling Stone ranked "I Fall to Pieces" at number 238 on their list of the 500 Greatest Songs of All Time.

Sissy Spacek sang the song on the soundtrack for the 1980 film Coal Miner's Daughter. The soundtrack was certified Gold by the RIAA.

The song was also ranked at number seven on CMT's television special of the 100 Greatest Songs in Country Music. Another Patsy Cline song, "Crazy", was ranked four positions higher at number three on the countdown. It was also ranked at number 107 on RIAA's list of the Songs of the Century. In 2014, Rolling Stone named the song number 40 on its "40 Saddest Country Songs of All Time".

In 2020, actor Sam Rockwell covered the song for the soundtrack of Trolls World Tour.

In 2024, singer Beyoncé covered a portion of the song on the intro of "Sweet Honey Buckiin'" from her debut country album Cowboy Carter.

In 2024, Rolling Stone ranked the song at #72 on its 200 Greatest Country Songs of All Time ranking.

== Personnel ==
All credits are adapted from the original liner notes of Showcase.

- Harold Bradley – 6-string electric bass
- Hank Garland – electric guitar
- Randy Hughes – acoustic guitar
- The Jordanaires – backing vocals
- Ben Keith – steel guitar
- Doug Kirkham – drums
- Bob Moore – acoustic bass
- Hargus "Pig" Robbins – piano

== Charts ==
Patsy Cline original version

Chart (1961)	Peak position
Australia Top 100 Singles (Kent Music Report)	13
US Adult Contemporary (Billboard)	6
US Billboard Hot 100	12
US Hot Country Songs (Billboard)	1

Diana Trask version

Chart (1969)	Peak position
Canada Country Singles (RPM)	29
US Bubbling Under Hot 100 (Billboard)	14
US Hot Country Songs (Billboard)	37

Jim Reeves and Patsy Cline overdubbed version

Chart (1982)	Peak position
Canada Country Singles (RPM)	41
US Hot Country Songs (Billboard)	54

Patsy Cline UK re-release

Chart (1991)	Peak position
UK Singles (Official Charts)	87

Aaron Neville and Trisha Yearwood duet version

Chart (1994)	Peak position
US Hot Country Songs (Billboard)	72
