= South of the Border (1939 song) =

1939 popular music song

"South of the Border Down Mexico Way"

Single by Gene Autry
- B-side: "Gold Mine in Your Heart"
- Published: March 30, 1939 by Peter Maurice Music Co., Ltd., London
- Released: October 13, 1939
- Recorded: September 11, 1939
- Studio: Stevens Hotel, Chicago
- Genre: Hillbilly, Country & Western
- Length: 2:48
- Label: Vocalion 5122
- Composer: Michael Carr
- Lyricist: Jimmy Kennedy

Gene Autry singles chronology
"Back in the Saddle Again" (1939)	"South of the Border Down Mexico Way" (1939)	"The Merry-Go-Roundup / I'm Beginning To Care" (1940)

"South of the Border (Down Mexico Way)"

Song by Shep Fields and His Rippling Rhythm
- B-side: "It's All Over Town (We're Thru)"
- Released: August 14, 1939
- Recorded: August 1, 1939
- Studio: New York City, New York
- Genre: Big Band
- Label: Bluebird B-10376

"South of the Border Down Mexico Way" is a popular song describing a trip to Mexico, written by Jimmy Kennedy and Michael Carr. It was originally released in 1939, with many versions following, including one for the film of the same name sung by star Gene Autry.

== Background ==
In the lyrics, a man looks back with regret for having left a woman he cannot forget. When he returns much later, she is preparing to wed, presumably another man. In the movie, however, she has become a nun to atone for her brother's crimes. Members of the Western Writers of America chose it as one of the Top 100 Western songs of all time.

== Recordings ==
The song was a hit in 1939 for Shep Fields, vocal by Hal Derwin, reaching the No.1 spot for five weeks. Other successful recordings in 1939 were by Guy Lombardo, Gene Autry, Ambrose (vocal by Denny Dennis) and Tony Martin.

== Other notable recordings ==
- Al Bowlly recorded May 11, 1939
- Frank Sinatra recorded the song on April 30, 1953 for Capitol Records and it reached the Billboard charts with a top position of #18 in a 4-week stay.
- Mel Tormé - ¡Olé Tormé!: Mel Tormé Goes South of the Border with Billy May (1959)
- Sam Cooke – included in his Cooke's Tour album (1960)
- Patsy Cline – included in her album Showcase (1961)
- The Shadows – for their album Out of the Shadows (1962)
- Dean Martin for his album Dino Latino (1962)
- Herb Alpert for his album South of the Border (1964)
- Bob Wills and the Texas Playboys released a version on the album “The Best of Bob Wills” (1970)
- Don McLean – included in his album Prime Time (1977)
- Willie Nelson – for his album What a Wonderful World (1988), and for his album Let's Face the Music and Dance (2013)
- Keely Smith for the album Keely Sings Sinatra (2001)
- Acker Bilk – included in the album Clarinet Moods (2002)
