= Hank Cochran =

American country musician (1935–2010)

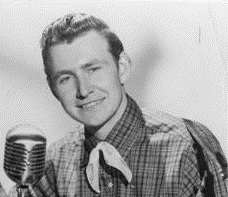
- Cochran in 1955

Background information
- Born: Garland Perry Cochran; August 2, 1935; Isola, Mississippi, U.S.
- Died: July 15, 2010 (aged 74) Nashville, Tennessee, U.S.
- Genres: Country
- Occupation: Singer-songwriter
- Instruments: Vocals; guitar
- Years active: 1955–2010
- Labels: Liberty; Monument; RCA; Capitol; Elektra

Garland Perry "Hank" Cochran (August 2, 1935 – July 15, 2010) was an American country music singer and songwriter. Starting during the 1960s, Cochran was a prolific songwriter in the genre, including major hits by Patsy Cline, Ray Price, Eddy Arnold, and others. Cochran was also a recording artist between 1962 and 1980, scoring seven times on the Billboard country music charts, with his greatest solo success being the number-20 "Sally Was a Good Old Girl." In 2014, he was inducted into the Country Music Hall of Fame.

== Biography ==
Cochran was born on August 2, 1935, in Isola, Mississippi, during the Great Depression. By the time he turned three, Cochran already had pneumonia, whooping cough, measles, and mumps. The doctor feared he would not survive to adulthood. His parents divorced when he was nine years old. He then moved with his father to Memphis, Tennessee, and was placed in an orphanage. After running away twice, he then was sent to live with his grandparents, in Greenville, Mississippi. His uncle Otis Cochran taught him to play the guitar as the pair hitchhiked from Mississippi to southeastern New Mexico to work in the oilfields. After returning to Mississippi as a teenager, Cochran went to California and picked olives. While there, he formed the Cochran Brothers, a duo with Eddie Cochran.

In 1960 at the age of 24, he hitchhiked for Hollywood, but ended up going to Nashville, and teamed with Harlan Howard to write the song "I Fall to Pieces". It became a major success for Patsy Cline (recorded November 16, 1960), reaching number one on the Billboard country music charts and number 12 on the Billboard Hot 100 (chart for all music categories). Cline also recorded Cochran's "She's Got You" (recorded December 17, 1961, it was another major hit, number one on the country charts and number 14 on the Hot 100), and "Why Can't He Be You" (recorded September 5, 1962).

In 1963, during a date at a movie theater, a line of dialogue in the film Diamond Head (film) inspired him to compose a new song. He left the theater quickly, and by the time he got home 15 minutes later, composed "Make the World Go Away." Ray Price recorded the song, and it rose to number two on the Billboard country charts in 1963. The next year, Eddy Arnold, who recorded it in as a pop-oriented Nashville Sound arrangement, made the song his signature hit and one of the biggest sellers in country music history, scoring number one on the country music charts, then in 1965 number six on the overall Billboard Hot 100 charts (his highest rated song ever).Arnold also recorded the song "I Want to Go with You".

Cochran wrote several successful songs sung by Burl Ives ("A Little Bitty Tear", "Funny Way of Laughin'", "The Same Old Hurt"). He also wrote songs for George Strait ("The Chair" with Dean Dillon and "Ocean Front Property" with Dillon and Royce Porter), Keith Whitley ("Miami, My Amy" also with Dillon and Porter), Merle Haggard ("It's Not Love (But It's Not Bad)"), "Don't You Ever Get Tired (of Hurting Me)", a number-one record for Ronnie Milsap, and Mickey Gilley ("That's All that Matters").

While working at publishing company Pamper Music, some evenings, he performed in a Nashville tavern named Tootsie's Orchid Lounge. While there, he noticed an amazing new talent. He encouraged management to contract the young songwriter, Willie Nelson, giving Nelson a raise owed to him at the time.

Two of his fondest memories were working with Natalie Cole (among other artists) on a 2003 tribute album to Patsy Cline (Remembering Patsy Cline), because of his love for her father Nat King Cole, and his collaboration with Vern Gosdin for the 1988 album Chiseled in Stone (Gosdin's highest rated album at number seven).

In 2008, singer Lea Anne Creswell came to Cochran's home to choose songs for a new album, subsequently called Lea Anne Sings Hank Cochran and ....

== Marriages ==
Cochran was married five times. His fourth wife was country music vocalist Jeannie Seely. They were married 10 years and divorced in 1979. In 1982, he married his fifth wife Suzi and they were married until his death in 2010. Prior to his relationship with Seely, Cochran had three sons.

== Death ==
Cochran had surgery for pancreatic cancer in July 2008. In April 2010, he had a second surgery to remove and repair a grapefruit-sized aortic aneurysm. His health did not improve, and he died on July 15, 2010, at the age of 74.

== Tributes ==
In October 2012, singer Jamey Johnson released Living for a Song: A Tribute to Hank Cochran, featuring his renditions of 16 Cochran compositions.

== Awards and honors ==
Awards and honors include:

- 1967: Walkway of Stars – Country Music Association
- 1974: Nashville Songwriters Hall of Fame
- 2003: Mississippi Music Hall of Fame
- 2014: Country Music Hall of Fame inductee

== Discography ==
=== Albums ===
Year	Album	US Country	Label
1965	Hits from the Heart	—	RCA
1965	Going on Training	—	RCA
1968	The Heart of Hank	41	Monument
1978	With a Little Help from My Friends	—	Capitol
1980	Make the World Go Away	—	Elektra
1980	Honeysuckle Rose (credited as "Willie Nelson & Family")	1	Columbia

=== Singles ===
Year	Single	Peak chart positions	Album
Year	Single	US Country	Album
1962	"Sally Was a Good Old Girl"	20	Going on Training
1962	"I'd Fight the World"	23	Hits from the Heart
1963	"A Good Country Song"	25	single only
1967	"All of Me Belongs to You"	70	The Heart of Hank
1978	"Willie"	91	With a Little Help from My Friends
1978	"Ain't Life Hell" (with Willie Nelson)	77	With a Little Help from My Friends
1980	"A Little Bitty Tear" (with Willie Nelson)	57	Make the World Go Away
