= Harold Bradley (guitarist) =

American guitarist (1926–2019)

- Birth name: Harold Ray Bradley
- Also known as: Tic Tac
- Born: January 2, 1926; Nashville, Tennessee, U.S.
- Died: January 31, 2019 (aged 93); Nashville, Tennessee, U.S.
- Genres: Country, pop, rock
- Occupation: Musician
- Instrument(s): Guitar, six-string bass
- Years active: 1943-2010
- Labels: Columbia Records
- Military career
- Allegiance: (United States)
- Service / branch: United States Navy
- Years of service: 1944-1946

Harold Ray Bradley (January 2, 1926 – January 31, 2019) was an American guitarist and entrepreneur, who was primarily a session musician who played on numerous country, rock and pop recordings, as well as producing numerous TV variety shows and movie soundtracks.

Bradley having started as a musician in the 1940s, became part of a group of session players that became known as the Nashville A-Team and he is one of the most recorded guitarists in music history. Bradley worked closely with his older brother Owen, and in 1954 they established the Bradley Film and Recording Studio, later commonly referred to as the Quonset Hut Studio, which was the first music industry-related business in what is now known as Music Row.

== Early life ==
Bradley was born in Nashville, Tennessee on January 2, 1926, one of six children of Vernon Bradley and Letha Maie Owen. As a child, he played tenor banjo but switched to guitar on the advice of his elder brother, record producer Owen. Owen arranged for Harold to tour with Ernest Tubb as lead guitarist in his band, The Texas Troubadours, while Harold was still in high school. After graduation, Harold joined the Navy in 1944 and was discharged in 1946, after which he attended George Peabody College (now a part of Vanderbilt University) in Nashville, studying music while accompanying Eddy Arnold and Bradley Kincaid at the Grand Ole Opry.

== Career ==
Bradley's first gig as a session guitarist was in Chicago in 1946 with Pee Wee King and the Golden West Cowboys. His debut in Nashville was several years later in 1949, and his acoustic rhythm guitar opens Red Foley's 1950 hit "Chattanoogie Shoe Shine Boy". In 1954, Owen and Harold built Bradley Film and Recording Studio, later commonly referred to as the Quonset Hut Studio, which was the first music industry-related business on what is now known as Music Row.

Harold enjoyed frequent work as a session musician throughout the 1950s, 1960s, and into the 1970s, performing on hundreds of albums by stars such as Elvis Presley, Patsy Cline, Slim Whitman, Roy Orbison and Willie Nelson. He also played bass guitar on records, initiating the "tic-tac" method of bass muting. He was a member of the Nashville A-Team, which would play for such musicians as Bob Dylan, Joan Baez and The Byrds.

In the 1960s, Harold recorded three albums as a pop guitarist on Columbia Records, Misty Guitar, Guitar for Lovers Only, and Bossa Nova Goes to Nashville.

From 1991 to 2008, Bradley served as the President of the Nashville chapter of the American Federation of Musicians (AFM). He was also the first President of the Nashville chapter of the Recording Academy. In 1999, he was elected as the AFM International Vice-President and served until 2010.

Bradley was inducted into the Country Music Hall of Fame in 2006, and was inducted into the Musician's Hall of Fame the following year. In 2010, Bradley was a recipient of the Trustees Award at the 52nd Grammy Awards.

Bradley died at Vanderbilt University Medical Center in Nashville on January 31, 2019, twenty-nine days after his 93rd birthday. He was survived by two daughters and his wife of 66 years, Eleanor Allen Bradley.

== Discography ==
- Bossanova Goes to Nashville (Columbia, 1963)
- Misty Guitar (Columbia, 1963)
- Guitar For Lovers Only (Columbia, 1966)
- Guitar for Sentimental Lovers (Harmony, 1972)
- Everything's Easy (2016)

With Kai Winding

- Modern Country (Verve, 1964)

== See also ==
- Nashville A-Team
