= Heartaches (song) =

1931 song by Al Hoffman and John Klenner

- Sheet music cover featuring Carmen and Guy Lombardo

Standard
- Published: 1931
- Genre: Big band, traditional pop
- Composer: Al Hoffman
- Lyricist: John Klenner

"Heartaches" is a song written by composer Al Hoffman and lyricist John Klenner and originally published in 1931. A fast-tempo instrumental version of the song by Ted Weems and his Orchestra became a major hit in 1947, topping the Billboard Best Selling Singles chart in the US. Later versions by band leader Harry James and doo-wop group the Marcels were also chart hits. "Heartaches" received renewed attention in the 2010s after several 1930s recordings of the song, including a version by Al Bowlly with Sid Phillips & his Melodians, were sampled in the Caretaker's album Everywhere at the End of Time.

== Early recordings ==
Al Hoffman composed "Heartaches" after moving to New York City in a bid to become a successful songwriter; though it was not initially a major hit, it has been described by Billboard as Hoffman's first great song. The song's lyrics were written by John Klenner. A 1931 recording by Guy Lombardo and his Royal Canadians on Columbia (catalogue number 2390-D), was a modest success. Another early version was issued by Sid Phillips & his Melodians with Al Bowlly providing the vocal. This recording was made in London in late August 1931 and released on the Edison Bell Winner label (EBW 5358).

== Ted Weems version ==
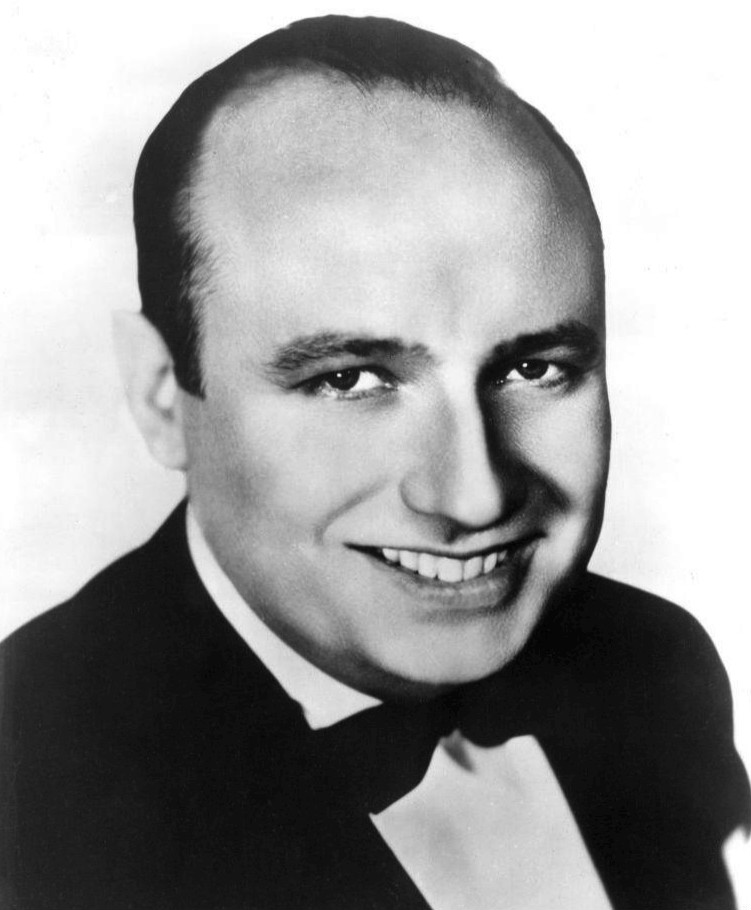
Ted Weems in 1944

The most successful version of the song is by the American bandleader Ted Weems and his Orchestra. Weems' instrumental arrangement features a prominent whistling part by Elmo Tanner over what the bandleader described as a "corny sort-of half rhumba rhythm". The original recording was made in 1933 on Bluebird B-5131 in a novel, fast tempo to low record sales. Tanner later described this version as "before its time", stating "its beat was too fast and it was in samba time. Nobody knew the samba in those days." In 1938, Weems and his Orchestra (including Tanner) re-recorded "Heartaches" at a slightly slower "rhumba fox trot" tempo for Decca Records. Like its predecessor, this version was not a chart success upon release. Weems' career was put on hold in early 1942 when he and his entire band enlisted in the United States Merchant Marine to fight in the Second World War.

In early 1947, Kurt Webster, a late-night disc jockey on WBT in Charlotte, North Carolina, a 50,000-watt station that reached across the East Coast, played Weems' 1938 version of "Heartaches". Webster enjoyed the tune and entered it into his regular rotation, leading to listeners frequently requesting it and "Heartaches" gaining national attention. To meet demand, Decca reissued the 1938 record (catalog number 25017), prompting Victor to reissue its 1933 version (catalog number 20-2175); both labels shared credit on the Billboard Best Selling Singles chart, where the song reached number 1 on March 15, 1947. Weems' "Heartaches" eventually sold over 2 million copies.

Ted Weems, whose musical career had declined during his military service, revived his orchestra to capitalize on the success of "Heartaches". He signed a new deal with Mercury Records and recruited his first manager, Howard Christensen. Weems received artist royalties from the 1933 Victor recording, but not the 1938 Decca recording, having let his contract expire. He did, however, receive composer royalties for its B-side "Oh! Monah". In May 1947, Weems made front-page news when he publicly repaid his debt to Kurt Webster, the man who had revived "Heartaches" and thus Weems' career. Weems staged a benefit performance by his band on June 6, with all proceeds going to war veteran Webster.

The success of Ted Weems' "Heartaches" prompted several other notable recordings in 1947. A version by Harry James and his Orchestra was released by Columbia Records as catalog number 37305. It first reached the Billboard magazine Best Seller chart on April 18, 1947, and lasted three weeks on the chart, peaking at number 8. In the United Kingdom, a recording of "Heartaches" by Vera Lynn was the most successful and the song impacted the sheet music chart from July to October 1947, peaking at number 10. The song features in the 1947 film Heartaches.

In January 1948, Billboard listed the Ted Weems version of "Heartaches" as 1947's third biggest-selling record in the United States, behind The Harmonicats' "Peg O' My Heart" and Francis Craig's "Near You". Al Hoffman was listed as the year's top songwriter, having composed not only "Heartaches" but also "Chi-Baba, Chi-Baba", which had hit number 1 in June in a recording by Perry Como, formerly a vocalist with Weems' orchestra.

== The Marcels version ==
The song was revived by the American doo-wop group the Marcels in 1961. The group recorded their version of "Heartaches" on September 1, 1961, and its release followed the success of their million-selling version of "Blue Moon". Their version of "Heartaches" reached the Top 10, peaking at number 7, as well as number 19 on the Hot R&B Sides chart. In Canada it reached number 22. The Marcels version appears in the film Popstar: Never Stop Never Stopping.

== Allan Sherman parody ==
A parody rendition by the American musician and satirist Allan Sherman features on his successful 1963 album My Son, the Nut. Titled "Headaches", Sherman's version is musically based on the Ted Weems arrangement and is lyrically a humorous commentary on advertisements for aspirin ("Headaches, headaches / Aspirin commercials give me headaches"). The song features the voice of a child, credited as Tom Greenleigh, who interrupts with a comically unreasonable demand; "Mommy! Can't you keep Daddy's car out of the driveway?".

== The Caretaker version ==
From 2016 to 2019, English electronic musician Leyland James Kirby, also known as the Caretaker, sampled the Al Bowlly, Seger Ellis, and Guy Lombardo recordings of "Heartaches" for his final project, Everywhere at the End of Time; all three are used multiple times in the project and serve as one of its leitmotifs, with each subsequent appearance becoming more distorted and disfigured than the last, representing the gradual distortion and destruction of memory and other mental faculties brought about by dementia. The complete edition of the project achieved viral popularity in October 2020 on TikTok as an online challenge, receiving coverage from publications including The New York Times.

== Other versions ==
- Somethin' Smith and the Redheads - US number 71 Billboard Hot 100 (1956)
- Patsy Cline - US number 73, UK number 31 (1962)
- Vince Hill - UK number 28 (1966)
