= Patsy Cline (1957 EP) =

EP by Patsy Cline
- Released: August 5, 1957
- Recorded: April 24 – May 23, 1957
- Studio: Bradley Studios, Nashville, Tennessee; Pythian Temple, New York City
- Genre: Country
- Label: Decca
- Producer: Owen Bradley, Paul Cohen

Patsy Cline chronology
Patsy Cline (1957)	Patsy Cline (1957)	Patsy Cline (1961)

Patsy Cline is an EP released by American country music singer, Patsy Cline on August 5, 1957. It was Cline's first EP released through Decca Records, as her previous was released under Coral Records, a Decca subsidiary.

Patsy Cline was released on the same day her self-titled debut album was released, as well as a second EP, titled, Songs by Patsy Cline. This EP, consisted of four tracks, two on each side of the record. Side one contained the songs "That Wonderful Someone" and "Three Cigarettes (In an Ashtray)," while side two contained "Hungry for Love" and "Fingerprints." All four of the songs were also released on her 1957 debut album, unlike the Songs Patsy Cline EP, which did not release any songs on her album.

Cline's label, 4 Star Records leased her EP through Decca Records (where it had been recorded) and issued it from there. It would be her last EP of 4 Star material until 1964. The cover photograph was the same photo released on her debut album that year. The cover was taken by photographer, Elmer Williams.

== Track listing ==
Side 1:

1. "That Wonderful Someone" — (Gertrude Burg) 2:26
2. "Three Cigarettes (In an Ashtray)" — (Eddie Miller, W.S. Stevenson) 2:11

Side 2:

1. "Hungry for Love" — (Miller, Stevenson) 2:25
2. "Fingerprints" — (Don Hecht, W.O. Fleener, Stevenson) 2:43

== Personnel ==
All recording sessions took place at Bradley Film and Recording Studios in Nashville, Tennessee as well as Decca's Pythian Temple Studio in New York, New York.

- Harold Bradley — electric bass
- Owen Bradley — piano
- Patsy Cline — lead vocals
- Farris Coursey — drums
- Hank Garland — electric guitar
- Grady Martin — electric guitar
- Bob Moore — acoustic bass
- Jack Shook — acoustic guitar
- Anita Kerr Singers — background vocals
