= I Can See an Angel =

Single by Patsy Cline
- B-side: "Never No More"
- Released: August 18, 1958
- Recorded: February 13, 1958
- Genre: Country; Nashville sound
- Length: 2:20
- Label: Decca
- Songwriter: Kay Adelman
- Producer: Owen Bradley

Patsy Cline singles chronology
"Let the Teardrops Fall" (1958)	"I Can See an Angel" (1958)	"If I Could See the World (Through the Eyes of a Child)" (1958)

"I Can See an Angel" is a song written by Kay Adelman that was first recorded by American country singer Patsy Cline. It was released as a single in 1958 via Decca Records and was produced by Owen Bradley. The song was among several singles Cline released with the Decca label during the late 1950s which did not chart any major music publications.

== Background and content ==
Patsy Cline had first signed with 4 Star Records and released multiple singles. However, only the song "Walkin' After Midnight" proved to be a hit when it reached number two on the country chart and crossed over to the pop music chart. Following this, Cline recorded a variety of material for the 4 Star label, ranging from traditional pop to rockabilly. 4 Star executives Paul Cohen and Bill McCall still believed she could have another hit if the right song was found. For these reasons, Cline was sent into the recording studio on February 13, 1958 in Nashville, Tennessee. Under the production of Owen Bradley, several songs were recorded that day including the track "I Can See an Angel." The song was composed by Kay Adelman.

== Release and reception ==
On August 18, 1958, "I Can See an Angel" was released via Decca Records. It was backed on the B-side by the track "Never No More." Like previous release, 4 Star leased its music to the Decca label based on a decision made by Paul Cohen in 1956. "I Can See an Angel" was not successful following its single release. Singles that followed from 4 Star yielded similar results through 1960. Biographer Ellis Nassour gave "I Can See an Angel" a negative response in his biography of Cline's life, calling the track "nothing exciting." In reviewing a compilation of Cline's Richie Unterberger of AllMusic grouped "I Can See an Angel" into a category with other songs she cut during the same era. Unterberger noted that the track hinted at better quality music that she would later record in the 1960s: "With some more work and better material, the prototype would pay big dividends just a year or two down the road," he concluded.

== Track listing ==
7" vinyl single

- "I Can See an Angel" – 2:20
- "Never No More" – 2:33
