= Let the Teardrops Fall =

Single by Patsy Cline
- B-side: "Come on In"
- Released: June 1, 1958
- Recorded: February 13, 1958
- Genre: Country; Rockabilly
- Length: 2:32
- Label: Decca
- Songwriter: Charles Jiles
- Producer: Owen Bradley

Patsy Cline singles chronology
"Stop the World (And Let Me Off)" (1958)	"Let the Teardrops Fall" (1958)	"I Can See an Angel" (1958)

"Let the Teardrops Fall" is a song composed by Charles Jiles that was originally recorded by American country singer Patsy Cline. It was released as a single in 1958 via Decca Records.

== Background ==
In 1957, Patsy Cline had her first major hit with the country-pop crossover hit "Walkin' After Midnight." However, her follow-up singles did not reach similar success. Signed to 4 Star Records, Cline was given material to record by executives Paul Cohen and Bill McCall. Hoping they could score a follow-up hit single, the pair sent Cline into a recording session on February 13, 1958, where she recorded "Let the Teardrops Fall." The song was composed by Charles Jiles. Like her previous recordings, the session contained a mixture of traditional country, pop and rockabilly music. The session was produced by Owen Bradley in Nashville, Tennessee.

== Release and reception ==
"Let the Teardrops Fall" was released as a single on June 1, 1958, on Decca Records. It was backed by the song "Come on In," a track Cline re-recorded during the same session in which she cut "Let the Teardrops Fall". The song was unsuccessful following its release, as was future singles released in 1958. The song received mixed reviews from writers and critics. Richie Unterberger of AllMusic reviewed a compilation of Cline's rock music cuts, which included "Let the Teardrops Fall." In his review, Unterberger found that Cline's style did not fit that of rock and roll: "It's not bad, but rockabilly was not Cline's forte -- she was much more at ease with ballads and midtempo numbers with a heavier pop/country feel. In comparison with '50s female rockabilly singers like Brenda Lee (who shared Cline's producer), Patsy comes off as rather stiff and inhibited." Meanwhile, writer Thom Jurek named the tune an "album pick" in his review of the Cline box set titled The Patsy Cline Collection.

== Track listing ==
7" vinyl single

- "Let the Teardrops Fall" – 2:32
- "Come on In" – 1:52
