= Then You'll Know =

Single by Patsy Cline

from the album Patsy Cline
- B-side: "I Don't Wanta"
- Released: November 18, 1957
- Recorded: April 25, 1957
- Studio: Decca Records Studios, New York City
- Genre: Country; Nashville sound
- Length: 3:05
- Label: Decca
- Songwriter: Bobby Lile
- Producer: Paul Cohen

Patsy Cline singles chronology
"Three Cigarettes in an Ashtray" (1957)	"Then You'll Know" (1957)	"Stop the World (and Let Me Off)" (1958)

"Then You'll Know" is a song by American country music singer Patsy Cline. It was composed by Bobby Lile and released as a single in 1957 via Decca Records. The song was the third single released from Cline's self-titled debut album. Although not a successful single, it was received positively by critics and writers.

== Background and content ==
In 1954, Patsy Cline signed her first recording contract with 4 Star Records and released a variety of singles, ranging in styles from traditional pop to traditional country. With 4 Star, only 1957's "Walkin' After Midnight" became a major pop crossover hit. The song's success prompted 4 Star to attempt to duplicate its success with a series of pop-flavored singles released in 1957. However, these songs proved unsuccessful and it was hoped that "Then You'll Know" would become a hit for Cline. The track had been composed by Bobby Lile. "Then You'll Know" was recorded on April 25, 1957, at the Decca Records Studios located in New York City. The sessions were produced by Paul Cohen.

== Release and reception ==
"Then You'll Know" was released on November 18, 1957, via Decca Records. Its flip-side was a remake of a song previously cut by Cline, "I Don't Wanta." The song was also included on Cline's self-titled debut album, which was also issued in 1957 through Decca. To promote the single, Cline attended the WSM Birthday Celebration and D.J. Convention in Nashville, Tennessee on November 13, 1957. According to Cline's biography by Ellis Nassour, Decca Records did not promote the single and disc jockeys "made no effort to play it," resulting in the single become unsuccessful. Thom Jurek of AllMusic gave the song positive reception in his review of 2002 Cline compilation: "'Then You'll Know' offers a view of Chet Artkins' countrypolitan before it ever articulated itself as such," he commented. In a separate review, Stephen Thomas Erlewine highlighted the song as "essential listening".

== Track listing ==
7" vinyl single

- "Then You'll Know" – 3:05
- "I Don't Wanta" – 2:21
