= Patsy Cline (disambiguation) =

Patsy Cline (1932–1963) was an American country music singer.

Patsy Cline may refer to her eponymous albums:

- Patsy Cline (album), 1957 studio album
- Patsy Cline (1957 EP)
- Patsy Cline (1961 EP)
- Patsy Cline (1962 EP)
