= Stop the World (and Let Me Off) =

1957 single by Carl Belew

Single by Carl Belew
- B-side: "I Can't Forget"
- Released: December 1957
- Genre: Country
- Length: 2:12
- Label: 4 Star
- Songwriters: Carl Belew; W.S. Stevenson

Carl Belew singles chronology
"Lie to Me" (1957)	"Stop the World (and Let Me Off)" (1957)	"24 Hour Night" (1957)

"Stop the World (and Let Me Off)" is a song written and originally performed by Carl Belew. It was released as a single first by Belew in January 1958. It was later followed by competing versions by Patsy Cline and Johnnie & Jack. The latter duo's version became the first successful version of the song to be a hit. It was later covered a decade later by Waylon Jennings and then again by Susan Raye in 1974.

== Carl Belew version ==
Carl Belew wrote and recorded the original version of "Stop the World (and Let Me Off)". The song's composition was also credited to W.S. Stevenson (a pen name for 4 Star Records executive Bill McCall). The session was recorded in 1957. In December 1957, Belew's song was released as a single via 4 Star Records, with the B-side being "I Can't Forget."

=== Track listing ===
7" vinyl single

- "Stop the World (and Let Me Off)" – 2:12
- "I Can't Forget" – 2:40

== Patsy Cline version ==
"Stop the World (and Let Me Off)"

Single by Patsy Cline
- B-side: "Walking Dream"
- Released: January 13, 1958
- Recorded: December 13, 1957
- Genre: Country; Nashville sound
- Length: 2:26
- Label: Decca
- Songwriters: Carl Belew; W.S. Stevenson
- Producer: Owen Bradley

Patsy Cline singles chronology
"Then You'll Know" (1957)	"Stop the World (and Let Me Off)" (1958)	"Let the Teardrops Fall" (1958)

American country singer Patsy Cline notably covered "Stop the World (and Let Me Off)". Cline's version was originally recorded on December 13, 1957 in Nashville, Tennessee in sessions produced by Owen Bradley. The song was given to Cline by Four Star executive Bill McCall, who hoped it would become her follow-up hit to 1957's "Walkin' After Midnight." Several other tracks were cut the same day, including "Walking Dream" and "If I Could See the World (Through the Eyes of a Child)". McCall urged Bradley to incorporate a "pop sound" into the session, according to biographer Ellis Nassour.

Cline's version of the song was released on January 13, 1958 via Decca Records. On the B-side was the song "Walking Dream." Despite multiple promotional appearances, Cline's version failed to become a hit. In a review of a 1993 compilation of Cline's Stephen Thomas Erlewine of AllMusic praised the track as being "very good" and "verging on the excellent."

=== Track listing ===
7" vinyl single

- "Stop the World (and Let Me Off)" – 2:26
- "Walking Dream" – 2:16

== Johnnie & Jack version ==
"Stop the World (and Let Me Off)"

Single by Johnnie & Jack
- B-side: "Camel Walk Stroll"
- Released: January 1958
- Recorded: December 4, 1957
- Studio: RCA Victor Studio (Nashville, Tennessee)
- Genre: Country
- Length: 2:32
- Label: RCA Victor
- Songwriters: Carl Belew; W.S. Stevenson
- Producer: Chet Atkins

"Stop the World (and Let Me Off)" was notably covered in 1958 by American country music duo, Johnnie & Jack. Their version was recorded in January 1958 at the RCA Victor Studio, located in Nashville, Tennessee. The session was produced by Chet Atkins. In January 1958, it was released on the RCA Victor label. In February 1958, it peaked at number seven on Billboard's country and western best seller chart. It spent 18 weeks on the charts and was also ranked No. 24 on Billboard's 1958 year-end country and western chart. It was the duo's final single to peak in the country top ten.

=== Track listing ===
7" vinyl single

- "Stop the World (and Let Me Off)" – 2:32
- "Camel Walk Stroll" – 2:05

=== Charts ===
Chart (1958)	Peak position
US Hot Country Singles (Billboard)	7

== Waylon Jennings version ==
"Stop the World (and Let Me Off)"

Single by Waylon Jennings

from the album Folk-Country
- B-side: "The Dark Side of Fame"
- Released: August 1965
- Recorded: March 18, 1965
- Studio: RCA Victor Studio (Nashville, Tennessee)
- Genre: Countrypolitan
- Length: 2:00
- Label: RCA Victor
- Songwriters: Carl Belew; W.S. Stevenson
- Producer: Chet Atkins

Waylon Jennings singles chronology
"That's the Chance I'll Have to Take" (1965)	"Stop the World (and Let Me Off)" (1965)	"Anita, You're Dreaming" (1965)

In 1965, American country singer-songwriter Waylon Jennings notably covered "Stop the World (and Let Me Off)" and released it as a single. Jennings recorded the track at the RCA Victor Studio in Nashville on March 18, 1965. Several additional tracks were cut during the same session. It was released as a single in August 1965 on the RCA Victor label backed with "The Dark Side of Fame." Jennings' version peaked at number 16 on the Billboard Hot Country Singles chart in 1965, becoming his first top 40 single and second charting hit.

The song was released on Jennings' debut studio record titled Folk-Country. Thom Jurek of AllMusic commented on the track in his review of the album: "'Stop the World (and Let Me Off)' is indicative of the kind of countrypolitan fare Atkins was developing at the label. And while this is only 1963 [1965], the listener can hear Jennings stretching the song to its limits -- at least the limits imposed by a mainstream country single.

=== Track listing ===
7" vinyl single

- "Stop the World (and Let Me Off)" – 2:00
- "The Dark Side of Fame" – 2:30

=== Charts ===
Chart (1965)	Peak position
US Hot Country Songs (Billboard)	16

== Susan Raye version ==
"Stop the World (and Let Me Off)"

Single by Susan Raye

from the album Singing Susan Raye
- B-side: "Love's Ups and Downs"
- Released: March 1974
- Recorded: February 6, 1974
- Studio: Buck Owens Studios
- Genre: Bakersfield sound
- Length: 2:17
- Label: Capitol
- Songwriters: Carl Belew; W.S. Stevenson
- Producers: Buck Owens; Jim Shaw

Susan Raye singles chronology
"When You Get Back from Nashville" (1973)	"Stop the World (and Let Me Off)" (1974)	"You Can Sure See It from Here" (1974)

In 1974, American country singer Susan Raye covered the song and released it as a single the same year. Raye's version of the song was recorded at Buck Owens Studios, located in Bakersfield, California. The session was held on February 6, 1974 and was produced by Buck Owens himself, alongside Jim Shaw. It was the only track recorded during the session. Raye's version of "Stop the World (and Let Me Off)" was issued as a single via Capitol Records in March 1974. Raye's version peaked at number 18 on the Billboard Hot Country Singles chart in 1974 and was among her final singles to become a top 20 hit. The song was later issued on Raye's 1974 album, Singing Susan Raye.

=== Track listing ===
7" vinyl single

- "Stop the World (and Let Me Off)" – 2:17
- "Love's Ups and Downs" – 2:22

=== Charts ===
Chart (1974)	Peak position
Canada Country Singles (RPM)	30
US Hot Country Songs (Billboard)	18
