= Three Cigarettes in an Ashtray =

Single by Patsy Cline

from the album Patsy Cline
- B-side: "A Stranger in My Arms"
- Released: August 12, 1957
- Recorded: April 25, 1957
- Studio: Decca Records Studio, New York City
- Genre: Country; Nashville sound
- Length: 2:12
- Label: Decca
- Songwriters: Eddie Miller; W.S. Stevenson
- Producer: Paul Cohen

Patsy Cline singles chronology
"Today, Tomorrow and Forever" (1957)	"Three Cigarettes in an Ashtray" (1957)	"Then You'll Know" (1957)

"Three Cigarettes in an Ashtray" is a song by American country music singer Patsy Cline. It was released as a single in 1957 via Decca Records. It was composed by Eddie Miller and W.S. Stevenson. Released on the heels of Cline's first hit "Walkin' After Midnight," the song was not successful but received positive reviews from critics and journalists.

== Background and content ==
Patsy Cline signed with 4 Star Records in 1954 and released a variety of singles for the label until the early 1960s. She recorded different selections of material, such as traditional country, traditional pop and rockabilly music. Yet only one single, "Walkin' After Midnight" (1957), became a major hit. Its crossover success prompted Cline's record company to select more pop material for her to record. Among the songs chosen was "Three Cigarettes in an Ashtray," which was composed by Eddie Miller and W.S. Stevenson (the latter was a pen name for 4 Star executive Bill McCall). Unlike previous sessions, Cline was produced by Paul Cohen and was recorded at the Decca Records Studio in New York City. The session was held on April 25, 1957, where Cline was backed by the Anita Kerr Singers. At the session, she recorded six tracks including "Don't Ever Leave Me Again," "Fingerprints" and "Try Again."

== Release and reception ==
"Three Cigarettes in an Ashtray" was released as a single on August 12, 1957 via Decca Records. It was backed by the B-side, "A Stranger in My Arms." It was Cline's fourth single release with the Decca label, which 4 Star leased. The song was also included on Cline's self-titled debut album, which was also issued in 1957 through Decca. Shortly after the single's release, Cline promoted the track by performing on the nationally syndicated television program, Ozark Jubilee. A full-page advertisement was also included in Billboard magazine the same month which read, "The 'Walkin' After Midnight' Gal has 2 New Smash Songs!" Despite promotion, the single was not received well by disc jockeys and the record-buying public.

Despite not having commercial success, "Three Cigarettes in an Ashtray" received a positive critical response. AllMusic's Stephen Thomas Erlewine spoke of the song in his review of Cline's compilation, Country Great: "There may not be any huge hits that jump out at the casual listener, but discerning fans will realize that any album containing 'That Wonderful Someone,' 'Too Many Secrets,' 'Then You'll Know,' and 'Three Cigarettes (In an Ashtray)' is essential listening." In 2000, Erlewine named the song again as an "album pick" when reviewing another compilation of Cline's early 4 Star material.

In 1987, "Three Cigarettes in an Ashtray" was notably covered by Canadian singer k.d. lang for her studio album, Angel with a Lariat. Mark Deming of AllMusic described lang's version as a "weepy closer" to her album.

== Track listing ==
7" vinyl single

- "Three Cigarettes in an Ashtray" – 2:12
- "A Stranger in My Arms" – 2:25
