= Susan Raye discography =

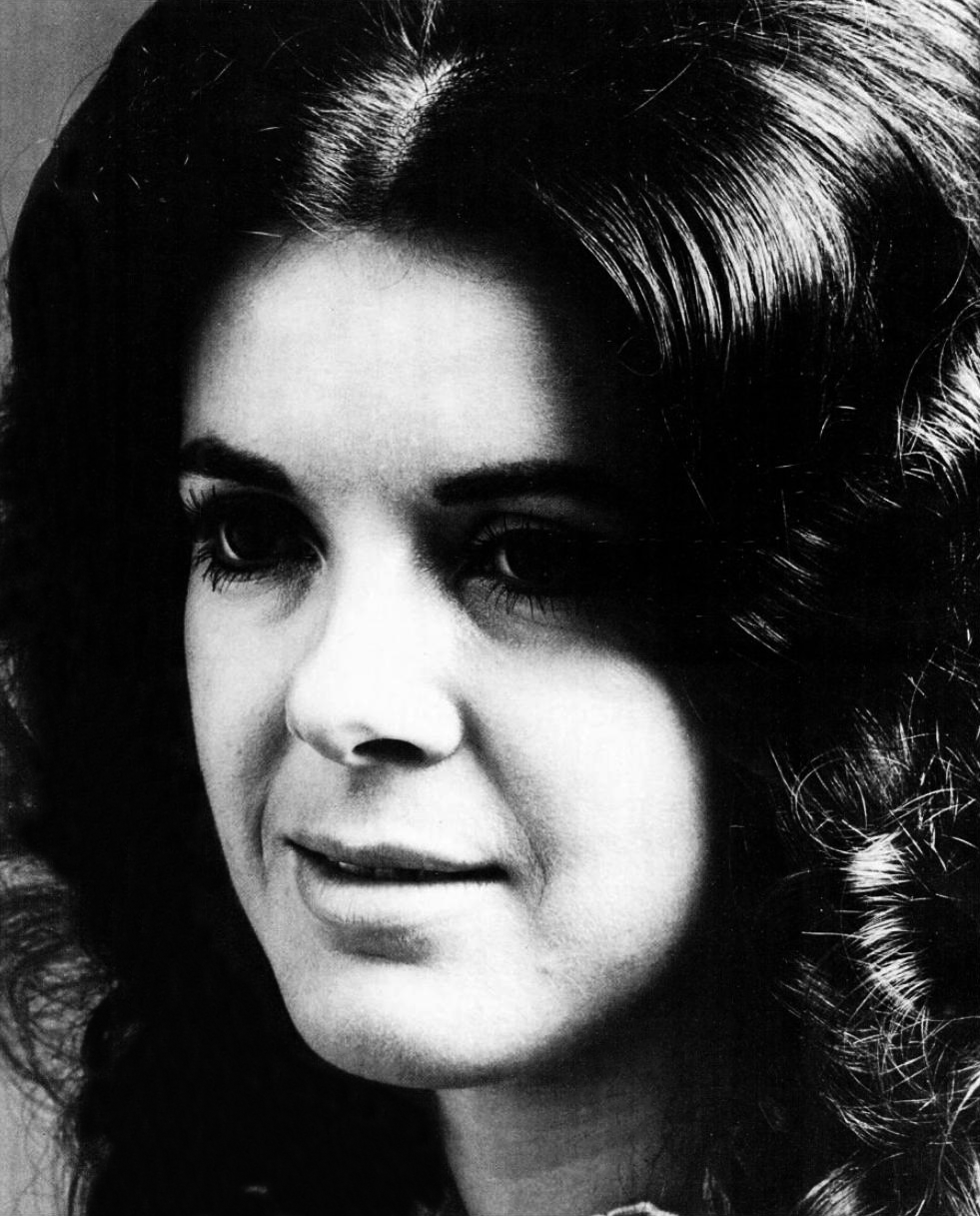
- Susan Raye in 1973
- Studio albums: 19
- Compilation albums: 7
- Singles: 32
- B-sides: 1

The discography of American country music artist Susan Raye consists of nineteen studio albums, seven compilation albums and thirty-two singles.

== Studio albums ==
Title	Details	Peak chart positions	
Title	Details	US Country	US
One Night Stand	Release date: September 1970; Label: Capitol Records	31	190
Willy Jones	Release date: February 1971; Label: Capitol Records	10	—
Pitty, Pitty, Patter	Release date: August 1971; Label: Capitol Records	6	—
I've Got a Happy Heart	Release date: January 1972; Label: Capitol Records	8	—
My Heart Has a Mind of Its Own	Release date: May 1972; Label: Capitol Records	29	—
Wheel of Fortune	Release date: September 5, 1972; Label: Capitol Records	9	—
Love Sure Feels Good in My Heart	Release date: January 1973; Label: Capitol Records	27	—
Cheating Game	Release date: May 1973; Label: Capitol Records	22	—
Plastic Trains, Paper Planes	Release date: September 10, 1973; Label: Capitol Records	43	—
Hymns by Susan Raye	Release date: 1973; Label: Capitol Records	47	—
Singing Susan Raye	Release date: 1974; Label: Capitol Records	43	—
Whatcha Gonna Do with a Dog Like That	Release date: 1975; Label: Capitol Records	33	—
Honey Toast and Sunshine	Release date: 1976; Label: Capitol Records	—	—
Susan Raye	Release date: 1977; Label: United Artists Records	—	—
There and Back	Release date: 1984; Label: Westexas Records	—	—
"—" denotes releases that did not chart

=== Collaborations with Buck Owens ===
Title	Details	Peak chart positions	
Title	Details	US Country	US
We're Gonna Get Together	Release date: April 6, 1970; Label: Capitol Records	10	154
The Great White Horse	Release date: September 8, 1970; Label: Capitol Records	22	—
Merry Christmas from Buck Owens and Susan Raye	Release date: 1971; Label: Capitol Records	—	—
The Good 'Ol Days (Are Here Again)	Release date: July 1973; Label: Capitol Records	29	—
"—" denotes releases that did not chart

== Compilation albums ==
Title	Details	Peak positions
Title	Details	US Country
The Best of Buck and Susan (with Buck Owens)	Release date: 1972; Label: Capitol Records	15
The Best of Susan Raye	Release date: 1974; Label: Capitol Records	30
L.A. International Airport	Release date: 1974; Label: Capitol Records	—
Then and Now	Release date: 1984; Label: Westexas Records	—
L.A. International Airport	Release date: 1993; Label: Repertoire Records	—
16 Greatest Hits	CD Release date: September 7, 1999; Label: Varèse Sarabande; Vinyl LP release date: 2020; Label Craft Recordings	—
Very Best of Buck Owens and Susan Raye (with Buck Owens)	CD Release date: May 23, 2011; Label: Varèse Sarabande; Vinyl LP release date: 2020; Label Craft Recordings	—
"—" denotes releases that did not chart

== Singles ==
Year	Single	Peak chart positions					Album
Year	Single	US Country	US	CAN Country	CAN	AUS	Album
1969	"Maybe If I Close My Eyes (It'll Go Away)"	—	—	—	—	—	One Night Stand
1969	"Put a Little Love in Your Heart"	30	—	—	—	—	One Night Stand
1970	"One Night Stand"	35	—	39	—	—	One Night Stand
1970	"Willy Jones"	10	—	9	—	—	Willy Jones
1971	"L.A. International Airport"	9	54	26	83	2	Willy Jones
1971	"Pitty, Pitty, Patter"	6	—	6	—	80	Pitty, Pitty, Patter
1971	"(I've Got a) Happy Heart"	3	—	—	—	97	I've Got a Happy Heart
1972	"A Song to Sing"	44	—	—	—	—	My Heart Has a Mind of Its Own
1972	"My Heart Has a Mind of Its Own"	10	—	—	—	—	My Heart Has a Mind of Its Own
1972	"Wheel of Fortune"	16	—	11	—	—	Wheel of Fortune
1972	"Love Sure Feels Good in My Heart"	17	—	18	—	—	Love Sure Feels Good in My Heart
1973	"Cheating Game"	18	—	20	—	—	Cheating Game
1973	"Plastic Trains, Paper Planes"	23	—	24	—	—	Plastic Trains, Paper Planes
1973	"When You Get Back from Nashville"	57	—	78	—	—	Cheating Game
1974	"Stop the World (And Let Me Off)"	18	—	30	—	—	Singing Susan Raye
1974	"You Can Sure See It from Here"	49	—	—	—	—	Singing Susan Raye
1974	"Whatcha Gonna Do with a Dog Like That"	9	—	8	—	—	Whatcha Gonna Do with a Dog Like That
1975	"Ghost Story"	58	—	—	—	—	Whatcha Gonna Do with a Dog Like That
1975	"He Gives Me Something (To Forgive Him For)"	—	—	—	—	—	Honey Toast and Sunshine
1975	"Honey Toast and Sunshine"	—	—	—	—	—	Honey Toast and Sunshine
1976	"Ozark Mountain Lullaby"	67	—	—	—	—	Susan Raye
1977	"Mr. Heartache"	64	—	—	—	—	Susan Raye
1977	"Saturday Night to Sunday Quiet"	53	—	—	—	—	Susan Raye
1977	"It Didn't Have to Be a Diamond"	51	—	—	—	—	Susan Raye
1986	"I Just Can't Take the Leaving Anymore"	68	—	—	—	—	There and Back
"—" denotes releases that did not chart

=== Singles with Buck Owens ===
Year	Single	Peak chart positions		Album
Year	Single	US Country	CAN Country	Album
1970	"We're Gonna Get Together"	13	6	We're Gonna Get Together
1970	"Togetherness"	12	18	We're Gonna Get Together
1970	"The Great White Horse"	8	9	The Great White Horse
1971	"Santa's Gonna Come in a Stage Coach"	—	—	Merry Christmas from Buck Owens and Susan Raye
1972	"Looking Back to See"	13	—	The Best of Buck and Susan
1973	"The Good Ol' Days Are Here Again"	35	52	The Good Ol' Days (Are Here Again)
1975	"Love Is Strange"	20	47	We're Gonna Get Together
"—" denotes releases that did not chart

== B-sides ==
Year	Single	Peak positions	A-Side Single
Year	Single	US Country	A-Side Single
1984	"Put Another Notch in Your Belt"	76	"I Just Can't Take the Leaving Anymore"
