= Today, Tomorrow and Forever (Patsy Cline song) =

Single by Patsy Cline
- B-side: "Try Again"
- Released: May 27, 1957
- Recorded: April 24, 1957
- Studio: Decca Records Studios, New York City
- Genre: Country; Nashville sound
- Length: 2:33
- Label: Decca
- Songwriter: Don Reid
- Producer: Paul Cohen

Patsy Cline singles chronology
| "Walkin' After Midnight" (1957) | "Today, Tomorrow and Forever" (1957) | "Three Cigarettes in an Ashtray" (1957) |

"Today, Tomorrow and Forever" is a song by American country music singer Patsy Cline. It was released as a single in 1957 via Decca Records and was composed by Don Reid. It was the follow-up release to Cline's major hit of 1957, "Walkin' After Midnight." However, "Today, Tomorrow and Forever" was not successful.

== Background and content ==
During the 1950s, Patsy Cline recorded with the label, 4 Star Records. Despite the release of multiple singles and various musical styles, Cline only had one major hit with 1957's "Walkin' After Midnight." The song was a major country and pop hit that year. Following its success, Cline's label was searching for a song that could duplicate "Walkin' After Midnight". 4 Star executive, Bill McCall, arranged for Cline to record several tracks at Decca Records Studios in New York City, alongside producer Paul Cohen. The session for "Today, Tomorrow and Forever" (written by Don Reid) was held at the Decca Recording Studio on April 24, 1957. Unlike previous sessions, she was told to record more pop-sounding material, which McCall insisted on. Other tracks recorded during the session included "Try Again," "Three Cigarettes (In an Ashtray)," and "Don't Ever Leave Me Again."

== Release and reception ==
"Today, Tomorrow and Forever" was released on May 27, 1957 via Decca Record. It was backed by "Try Again" on the flip side. It was Cline's third Decca release. The single was given a full-page advertisement on Billboard magazine following its release. To promote the record, Cline also toured multiple dates alongside country artists Brenda Lee and Porter Wagoner. The song did not become successful, along with two additional singles Decca released in 1957. "Today, Tomorrow and Forever" has been given descriptions by music critics since its original release. In reviewing a self-titled compilation, AllMusic described the song as "hardcore country." In another review, the song was described as an R&B cut.

== Track listing ==
7" vinyl single

- "Today, Tomorrow and Forever" – 2:33
- "Try Again" – 2:00
