= I Love You, Honey =

Single by Patsy Cline
- B-side: "Come on In"
- Released: February 5, 1956
- Recorded: January 1, 1955
- Studio: Bradley Studios, Nashville, Tennessee
- Genre: Country; traditional country
- Label: Coral
- Songwriters: Eddie Miller; W.S. Stevenson
- Producer: Owen Bradley

Patsy Cline singles chronology
| "Hidin' Out" (1955) | "I Love You, Honey" (1956) | "Stop, Look and Listen" (1956) |

"I Love You, Honey" is a song recorded by American country music singer Patsy Cline, composed by Eddie Miller and W.S. Stevenson. It was released as a single on Coral Records in February of 1956.

== Background and content ==
Patsy Cline signed her first recording contract in 1954 with 4 Star Records and began releasing singles with them shortly thereafter. She began working under the direction of producer Owen Bradley who helped find material for her first recording session. She recorded "I Love You Honey" in this first recording session, on January 5, 1955, at the Bradley Film and Recording Studio in Nashville, Tennessee. She also cut the tracks "I Cried All the Way to the Altar," "I Don't Wanta," and "Come on In" during the session. "I Love You Honey" was one of several tracks composed by Eddie Miller and W.S. Stevenson that Cline recorded for the label. Miller stated that he composed the song when he was fourteen.

== Release and reception ==
"I Love You, Honey" was originally shelved after it was recorded. Paul Cohen of 4 Star Records later said he was not pleased with the session. It was released as a single on February 5, 1956, on Coral Records (with "Come on In" on the flip side). It was the third single of Cline's career. It received positive reception from writer Thom Jurek of AllMusic, who named it an "album pick" when reviewing the 1991 box set release, The Patsy Cline Collection. Ellis Nassour of the biography Honky Tonk Angel: The Intimate Story of Patsy Cline called the track "a funny, bouncy standout."

== Track listing ==
7" vinyl single

- "I Love You, Honey"
- "Come on In"
