= Songs by Patsy Cline =

EP by Patsy Cline
- Released: August 5, 1957
- Recorded: June 1, 1955
- Genre: Country
- Label: Coral
- Producer: Owen Bradley

Patsy Cline chronology
Songs by Patsy Cline (1957)	Patsy Cline (1957)

Songs by Patsy Cline is the debut EP released by American country music singer, Patsy Cline on August 5, 1957.

The EP was released on the same date that Cline's self-titled debut album was released. However, none of the four tracks on the EP were included on the album. Two of the songs had previously been released as singles; "A Church, a Courtroom, and Then Goodbye" and "Hidin' Out". All four of these tracks were recorded during Cline's first recording session on June 1, 1955. None of these singles were successful. Cline eventually had her first major hit with "Walkin' After Midnight" in 1957, which is the key reason Songs by Patsy Cline was released. It would be one of two extended play albums issued before her signing to Decca Records in late 1960.

Songs by Patsy Cline was issued by Coral Records, a Decca subsidiary. Cline's label, 4 Star Records, leased money from Coral to issue her 1957 EP. The cover photograph was provided by Rush Studios.

== Track listing ==
Side 1:

1. "Honky Tonk Merry Go Round" — (Eddie Miller, W.S. Stevenson) 2:20
2. "A Church, a Courtroom, Then Goodbye" — (Sammy Masters) 3:02

Side 2:

1. "Turn the Cards Slowly" — (Miller, Stevenson) 2:35
2. "Hidin' Out" — (Frank Simon, Stan Gardner) 2:25

== Personnel ==
Recording sessions occurred on June 1, 1955 at Bradley Film and Record Studios in Nashville, Tennessee, United States.

- Harold Bradley — acoustic guitar
- Owen Bradley — piano
- Patsy Cline — lead vocals
- Farris Coursey — drums
- Don Helms — steel guitar
- Tommy Jackson — fiddle
- Grady Martin — electric guitar
- Bob Moore — acoustic bass
