= By Request (Brenda Lee album) =

Studio album by Brenda Lee
- Released: May 18, 1964
- Recorded: September–October 1963
- Studios: Columbia (Nashville, Tennessee)
- Genres: Nashville Sound; Pop
- Label: Decca
- Producer: Owen Bradley

Brenda Lee chronology
..."Let Me Sing" (1963)	By Request (1964)	Merry Christmas from Brenda Lee (1964)

Singles from By Request
- 1. "I Wonder/My Whole World Is Falling Down" Released: June 1963; 2. "The Grass Is Greener" Released: September 1963; 3. "As Usual" Released: November 1963

By Request is the tenth studio album by American singer Brenda Lee. It was released on May 18, 1964 via Decca Records and contained 12 tracks. A majority of the album featured covers of songs first made popular by other recording artists of the era. Of its new recordings were three singles: "I Wonder" (with its B-side "My Whole World Is Falling Down"), "The Grass Is Greener" and "As Usual". The singles reached top ten and top 20 positions on record charts throughout the world. By Request was met with mixed reviews upon its release.

== Background, recording and content ==
Brenda Lee rose to stardom as a teenager recording rock and roll and pop material. Although Lee's records were made with country producer Owen Bradley, she had a string of US top ten pop singles during the early 1960s. This included "I'm Sorry", "I Want to Be Wanted", "Fool No. 1" and "Break It to Me Gently". Following 1963, Lee's singles reached the US top 20 but remained more commercially successful in Europe. Three of her singles reached top 20 and top 25 positions in the US, which appeared on Lee's next studio album By Request: "I Wonder", "The Grass Is Greener" and "As Usual".

By Request was recorded in sessions held at the Columbia Studio, located in Nashville, Tennessee. The recording sessions took place between September and October 1963. They were overseen by producer Owen Bradley. The album consisted of 12 tracks. The only new recordings on the project were "The Grass Is Greener", "My Whole World Is Falling Down" and "As Usual". The remaining nine tracks were cover versions of songs recorded by other artists of the era. The liner notes described the album's covers as "big hits of the day". These songs included "Danke Schoen", "Why Don't You Believe Me?", "Tammy" and "Blue Velvet".

== Release, chart performance and critical reception ==
Professional ratings
Review scores
Source	Rating
Allmusic	2/5 stars

By Request was released by Decca Records on May 18, 1964. It was distributed as a vinyl LP, containing six songs on either side of the record. It was the tenth studio album in Lee's career. The album was promoted by Decca as part of a "dealer-incentive program" to help increase sales By Request peaked at the number 90 position on the US Billboard 200 albums chart. It was Lee's first studio project to reach a position outside the US top 40 at the time of its release. The album was met with mixed reviews by critics. Billboard found Lee's covers to be "delightful performances" in their review of the project. Greg Adams of AllMusic gave the project two out of five stars and wrote, "By Request offers a useful roundup of hit singles for vinyl addicts, but no surprises for completists."

== Singles ==
By Request included three singles released in 1963. Its first was "I Wonder", which Decca Records first issued in June 1963. The song reached number 25 on the US Hot 100 and number nine on the US adult contemporary chart. It also reached number nine on the UK Singles Chart. Its B-side was "My Whole World Is Falling Down", which also made the US Hot 100, peaking at number 24. It also peaked at number eight on the US adult contemporary chart. "The Grass Is Greener" was released as a single in September 1963 by Decca. The song climbed higher on the US Hot 100, peaking at number 17, while also reaching number seven on the US adult contemporary chart. The third single included was "As Usual", which was released in November 1963. It was the album's highest-charting single, peaking at number 12 on the US Hot 100, number five on the US adult contemporary chart and number five on the UK Singles chart.

== Track listing ==
Side one
No.	Title	Writer(s)	Length
1.	"More" (from the film Mondo Cane)	Riz Ortolani; Nino Oliviero; Norman Newell	2:04
2.	"Days of Wine and Roses"	Henry Mancini; Johnny Mercer	2:45
3.	"Danke Schoen"	Bert Kaempfert; Kurt Schwabach; Milt Gabler	2:35
4.	"Tammy"	Ray Evans; Jay Livingston	2:53
5.	"Why Don't You Believe Me"	Lew Douglas; King Laney; Roy Rodde	2:30
6.	"I Love You Because"	Leon Payne	2:46

Side two
No.	Title	Writer(s)	Length
1.	"As Usual"	Alex Zanetis	2:32
2.	"Blue Velvet"	Lee Morris; Bernie Wayne	2:35
3.	"My Whole World Is Falling Down"	Bill Anderson; Jerry Crutchfield	1:52
4.	"I Wonder"	Cecil Gant; Raymond Leveen	2:55
5.	"I'm Confessin' (That I Love You)"	Al J. Neiburg	2:55
6.	"The Grass Is Greener"	Mike Anthony; Barry Mann	2:25

== Chart performance ==
Chart (1964)	Peak position
US Billboard 200	90

== Release history ==
Region	Date	Format	Label	Ref.
Australia	May 18, 1964	Vinyl LP	Universal Record Club	
Brazil	May 18, 1964	Vinyl LP	Decca Records	
Germany	May 18, 1964	Vinyl LP	Brunswick Records	
North America	May 18, 1964	Vinyl LP	Decca Records	
South Africa; United Kingdom	May 18, 1964	Vinyl LP	Brunswick Records	
Venezuela	May 18, 1964	Vinyl LP	Brunswick Records	
North America	circa 2020	Music download; streaming	MCA Nashville	
