= A Church, a Courtroom, Then Goodbye =

"A Church a Courtroom, Then Goodbye"

Single by Patsy Cline

from the EP Songs by Patsy Cline
- B-side: "Honky Tonk Merry Go Round"
- Released: July 20, 1955
- Recorded: June 1, 1955
- Studio: Bradley Studios (Nashville, Tennessee)
- Genre: Country; traditional country
- Length: 3:01
- Label: Coral
- Songwriters: Eddie Miller; W.S. Stevenson
- Producer: Owen Bradley

Patsy Cline singles chronology
"A Church a Courtroom, Then Goodbye" (1955)	"Hidin' Out" (1955)

"A Church, a Courtroom, Then Goodbye" is a song by American country music singer Patsy Cline. It was composed by Eddie Miller and W.S. Stevenson. It was released as Cline's debut single in July 1955 via Coral Records.

== Background ==
Patsy Cline began performing in a country music band led by Bill Peer. With his assistance, she signed her first recording contract in 1954 with 4 Star Records. Cline began recording in Nashville, Tennessee alongside producer Owen Bradley. Bradley was chosen to produce her because she was believed to have a "pop sound". "A Church, a Courtroom, Then Goodbye" was recorded on July 1, 1955 at the Bradley Studios. The track had been composed by Eddie Miller and W.S. Stevenson (a pen name for Bill McCall). It was Cline's third recording session in her career. She cut several additional sides during the same session, including "Turn the Cards Slowly," "Hidin' Out," and "Honky Tonk Merry Go Round."

== Release and reception ==
"A Church, a Courtroom, Then Goodbye" was released as a single on July 20, 1955 via Coral Records. It was backed on the B-side by "Honky Tonk Merry Go Round." The song was later included on Cline's debut extended play titled Songs by Patsy Cline. The EP also included two additional tracks. A month prior to its release, Cline promoted the track in Nashville, where she appeared alongside Ernest Tubb on the Grand Ole Opry. She also appeared at Nashville's Centennial Park and performed for a crowd estimated at fifteen thousand. Despite promotional appearances, the single did not become a hit.

The song has since been reviewed by critics and journalists. In reviewing Cline's 1993 compilation album, AllMusic described "A Church, a Courtroom, Then Goodbye" as "full-blooded honky-tonk, with steel guitar or fiddle front and center." In a review of another compilation, James Christopher Monger named it among Cline's "greatest moments" as an artist, alongside her future hits.

== Track listing ==
7" vinyl single

- "A Church, a Courtroom, Then Goodbye" – 3:01
- "Honky Tonk Merry Go Round" – 2:18
