= Los Angeles International Airport in popular culture =

Numerous films and television shows have been set or filmed partially at Los Angeles International Airport (LAX), at least partly due to the airport's proximity to Hollywood studios. Film shoots at the Los Angeles airports, including LAX, produced $590 million for the Los Angeles region from 2002 to 2005.

== 1960s–1980s ==
- In the 1966 musical film Hold On! there is a riot of teenage girls swarming aspiring starlet Cecilie Bannister at LAX.
- In the opening credit sequence to 1967's The Graduate, Dustin Hoffman's character is filmed passing wearily through an LAX concourse connection tunnel to "The Sound of Silence" by Simon & Garfunkel. In the 1997 film Jackie Brown, Pam Grier walks past the same spot to soaring soul music by Bobby Womack.
- "L.A. International Airport", a song written by Leanne Scott and first recorded by David Frizzell in 1970, was covered in 1971 by Susan Raye and this version reached No. 9 on the Billboard Country Singles chart (and No. 54 on the Hot 100 singles chart). The song was re-recorded with updated lyrics in 2003 by Shirley Myers for the 75th anniversary of LAX.
- A few episodes of the television police drama Adam-12 (1968–75) took place in and around LAX.
- The 1976 Walt Disney comedy film No Deposit, No Return has scenes shown around the interior and the exterior of the LAX terminal.
- Mel Brooks' 1977 satirical comedy High Anxiety begins with Dr. Richard Thorndyke (Brooks) landing at LAX and having strange encounters inside the terminal.
- A few episodes of the television police drama Columbo (1971–78) had scenes that took place at LAX, including inside the terminals and external aerial shots.
- The 1980 Zucker, Abrahams and Zucker comedy Airplane! begins at LAX. Additionally, a twist on the iconic public announcement regarding the "white zone" is parodied in the film's opening scene.
- In 1982, British band Tears for Fears filmed a segment of the music video for Pale Shelter at the airport.
- The 1984 film Starman has a scene where a Japan Airlines Boeing 747 is seen taking off from LAX during the movie's opening credits.
- Several scenes of the 1985 Arnold Schwarzenegger motion picture Commando were filmed at the Tom Bradley International Terminal, on the airfield, and in an LAX parking deck.
- The 1985 film To Live and Die in L.A. featured a stunt in a terminal at LAX of William Petersen's character running along the top of the dividers between the terminal's moving sidewalk.
- The 1987 animated film The Chipmunk Adventure has its ending scene happen at LAX.

== 1990s ==
- Stephen King's 1990 horror novella The Langoliers and its 1995 movie adaptation feature LAX as the starting point and ending destination for the protagonists.
- The Japan Airlines commercials featuring Janet Jackson were filmed in LAX to promote their Executive class (business class) products on the then-brand new Boeing 747-400. One commercial used Tom Bradley Terminal for the "Concourse ad" which featured the song "Rhythm Nation" and the LAX runways were used for another commercial featuring Jackson dancing against a backdrop of Japan Airlines 747-400's to her single "Escapade".
- The opening sequence of the 1991 television series Going Places begins with the side-view of an airplane landing at the Los Angeles International Airport, followed by the view of a "Welcome to Los Angeles" sign under a highway bridge.
- The 1994 film My Girl 2 starring Anna Chlumsky features LAX.
- The 1994 film Clifford, starring Martin Short and Charles Grodin, was filmed in part of the terminals of LAX.
- The 1994 film Speed, starring Keanu Reeves and Sandra Bullock, was filmed in part on the runways of LAX.
- The 1995 film Heat starring Robert De Niro, Val Kilmer and Al Pacino has its ending scenes filmed at LAX.
- The 1995 Sandra Bullock film The Net features Bullock's character finding her car missing from an LAX parking lot.
- The 1997 film Liar Liar starring Jim Carrey features a climactic scene where Fletcher Reede (Carrey) struggles to keep his son. He hurries to LAX, but his son's plane has already left the terminal. Desperate, he hijacks a mobile stairway and pursues the plane onto the runway.
- In the 1997 film Face/Off, a chartered plane crashes into an LAX hangar in the beginning of the film.
- The 1997 film Turbulence starring Ray Liotta and Lauren Holly features a landing attempt by Holly's character on an LAX runway.
- The 1997 Michael Crichton novel Airframe starts with a fictional airline from Hong Kong to Denver making an emergency landing at LAX.
- LAX stood in for Sheremetyevo International Airport, the departure airport of Air Force One, in the 1997 Wolfgang Petersen film Air Force One.
- The 1999 Natalie Portman and Susan Sarandon film Anywhere but Here was partly filmed at LAX.
- The 1999 PlayStation video game Driver contains a mission featuring LAX.
- The 1999 film Fight Club starring Brad Pitt and Edward Norton features an opening scene where the two arrive at LAX on the same flight.
- The music video of Backstreet Boys' "I Want It That Way" was filmed and is set mostly at the airport. A majority of the scenes were filmed at Tom Bradley International Terminal, which serves as a setting for the chorus. The scenes involving a Boeing 727 and where they are greeted by fans was filmed in one of the hangars of LAX. Additionally, a Delta Air Lines Lockheed L-1011 TriStar appears when Howie Dorough sings the fourth verse.

== 2000s ==
- The 2000 film Charlie's Angels feature a scene in LAX.
- The 2001 Denzel Washington film Training Day concludes with Alonzo Harris unsuccessfully fleeing to LAX only to be shot dead by the Russian mafia in retaliation for Alonzo’s failure to repay his debt to them.
- The 1999-2006 NBC drama The West Wing shows then-former governor Jed Bartlet consoling his assistant Josh Lyman at the Delta gates of then-Delta complex Terminal 5. It was a stand in for Delta gates at O'Hare International Airport.
- The 2002 comedy-drama film Catch Me If You Can, based on the life of Frank Abagnale Jr. and starring Leonardo DiCaprio and Tom Hanks, was partly filmed at LAX and nearby Ontario International Airport.
- LAX was the departure point for Uma Thurman's character in the 2003 Quentin Tarantino film Kill Bill: Volume 1, wherein she takes a flight to Okinawa, Japan, to meet and acquire a sword from a renowned swordsmith as part of her revenge plan against a former comrade who now heads several crime syndicates in Tokyo.
- The opening scene of the 2004 neo-noir crime thriller Collateral starring Tom Cruise and Jamie Foxx is set at LAX. Cruise's character, a hitman, receives a briefcase in the airport.
- The 2004 Tom Hanks film The Terminal had pre-production shooting done at LAX.
- The 2004 comedy Soul Plane features airline NWA's first flight from Los Angeles International Airport.
- In the second Splinter Cell game, Splinter Cell: Pandora Tomorrow, the last mission takes place in LAX where Sam Fisher infiltrates LAX via the parking garage, takes out terrorists disguised as LAX employees and rogue CIA agent Norman Soth, and destroys their bioweapon.
- Two games from the Grand Theft Auto series, Grand Theft Auto: San Andreas and Grand Theft Auto V, featured and parodied the airport as Los Santos International Airport or LSX and was commonly called as Los Santos International. The Theme Building, light towers, and the control tower were also featured.
- In the 2004 film The Day After Tomorrow, two tornadoes are seen thrashing an Airbus A330 on the airport's taxiway.
- The 2004 television series LAX featured Heather Locklear in a fictional drama of several managers working at the airport. Exterior shots for the pilot episode were filmed in Texas; sources differ on whether Dallas/Fort Worth International Airport or Fort Worth Alliance Airport stood in for Los Angeles International. Many other scenes were filmed using a vacant terminal and a disused Boeing 727 at Ontario International Airport, interspersed with establishing shots of the real LAX.
- The 2005 PlayStation 2 video game, L.A. Rush by Midway Games, features LAX.
- The reality 2005 TV series Airline features the stories of Southwest Airlines employees and passengers originating from LAX, Chicago Midway International Airport, Baltimore–Washington International Airport and William P. Hobby Airport.
- The 2006 Samuel L. Jackson film Snakes on a Plane featured a flight heading towards LAX from Honolulu, Hawaii.
- In the episode, "The Woman at the Airport" from the television series Bones, FBI Special Agent Seeley Booth and Dr. Temperance Brennan investigate a woman's remains found at several locations around LAX.
- The music video for Maroon 5's song "Makes Me Wonder" was filmed at LAX.
- In the 2007 DreamWorks Animation animated film Bee Movie, Barry B. Benson (Jerry Seinfeld) and Vanessa Bloome (Renee Zellweger) fly the flowers as luggage on a flight from Los Angeles International Airport in Los Angeles, California to John F. Kennedy International Airport in New York City, New York to re-pollinate the world.
- Susan Raye, who has been retired from the music industry since 1986, made a rare public appearance to sing her classic hit at a concert at the celebration and to be on hand when a proclamation was issued to make the song the official song of LAX.
- Los Angeles-based rapper Game had a 2008 album titled LAX.
- The airport is mentioned in the opening lines of Miley Cyrus's 2009 hit "Party in the U.S.A.", with the lyrics "I hopped off the plane at LAX..."
- The music video for American Idol Season 7 winner David Cook's song "Come Back to Me" was filmed at LAX.

== 2010–present ==
- In a 2010 History Channel episode of Life After People, the Theme Building and LAX Control Tower are shown what would happen to them after years of neglect.
- TV show Modern Family shot an episode titled “Airport 2010” at the airport, which followed the Dunphy-Tucker-Pritchetts as they prepared to embark on a vacation to Maui.
- The 2011 episode titled "The Middle Men" from the British science fiction television show Torchwood: Miracle Day, featured LAX.
- In the final season premiere of Lost, notably titled "LA X", the alternate timeline sequences are mostly set in LAX, which was the intended destination of Oceanic Airlines Flight 815.
- Los Angeles International Airport also featured in the Brett Ratner film Rush Hour, where Chief Inspector Lee (Jackie Chan) and Detective James Carter (Chris Tucker) board a United Airlines Boeing 747-400 bound for Hong Kong.
- The LAX Theme Building influenced the stage set up for the U2 360 Tour.
- In the video game Destroy All Humans!, a majestic base appears to be similar to LAX.
- LAX was featured as a playable stage in the 2003 video game Midnight Club II.
- In 2015 science fiction action film Terminator Genisys, in the post apocalyptic future setting, the ruins of LAX becomes one of Skynet's concentration camps, where it also houses its prototype time machine.
- In the 2017 drama film All Eyez on Me, the main character, Tupac Shakur, is shown flying into LAX airport when going to California.
- In the 2020 action film Tenet, LAX's Tom Bradley International Terminal served as a stand-in for Oslo Airport, Gardermoen. An Asiana Airlines A380 is also seen in the film.
- In the epilogue of the late American animated television show Amphibia, Sasha Waybright arrives at LAX to pick up Marcy Wu from the terminal in order to visit Anne Boonchuy and celebrate Anne's birthday.
- The plot of the 2024 action film Carry-On revolves around a fictional TSA officer at LAX who is blackmailed into permitting a nerve agent onto a plane.
