= Hidin' Out =

Single by Patsy Cline

from the EP Songs by Patsy Cline
- B-side: "Turn the Cards Slowly"
- Released: November 5, 1955
- Recorded: June 1, 1955
- Studio: Bradley Studios, Nashville, Tennessee
- Genre: Country; traditional country
- Length: 2:23
- Label: Coral
- Songwriters: Eddie Miller; W.S. Stevenson
- Producer: Owen Bradley

Patsy Cline singles chronology
"A Church, a Courtroom, Then Goodbye" (1955)	"Hidin' Out" (1955)	"I Love You, Honey" (1956)

"Hidin' Out" is a song by American country music singer Patsy Cline. It was composed by Eddie Miller and W.S. Stevenson. It was released as the second single in Cline's career and second issued on Coral Records. It originally appeared on the album, Songs by Patsy Cline.

== Background and content ==
After several years of regional performers around her hometown of Winchester, Virginia, Patsy Cline signed her first recording contract in 1954 with 4 Star Records. In early 1955, Cline traveled to Nashville, Tennessee, where she made her first recording sessions with producer Owen Bradley. Because it was believed she had a "pop sounding" voice, Bradley (who had pop experience) was chosen as her producer. Cline recorded "Hidin' Out" in her second recording session with Bradley, which took place on June 1, 1955. The session was held at the Bradley Film and Recording Studio in Nashville. Also cut in the same session was "Turn the Cards Slowly," "A Church, a Courtroom, Then Goodbye" and "Honky Tonk Merry Go Round." The song was composed by Eddie Miller and W.S. Stevenson (a pen name for Bill McCall), both of whom also composed additional material Cline cut during the same session.

== Release and reception ==
On November 5, 1955, "Hidin' Out" was released as single on Coral Records. It was the second single release in Cline's career. On the flip side was the song, "Turn the Cards Slowly." "Hidin' Out" was released in November to coincide with WSM's yearly birthday celebration. Cline attended the event to promote the single and attended a performance of the Grand Ole Opry. Despite its promotion, "Hidin' Out" failed to chart the Billboard Hot Country Songs survey. The song was first included on Cline's extended play release, Songs by Patsy Cline. It has since been reviewed by critics and journalists. In reviewing Cline's 1994 compilation, Golden Classics, AllMusic described the track as having "textbook honky-tonk, with shivering steel and plaintive fiddle." In an additional review, Cub Koda noted that "Hidin' Out" would be "far better-suited to Kitty Wells, but Cline's approach is both musical and varied, given the sawing fiddles and paint-by-numbers backing."

== Track listing ==
7" vinyl single

- "Hidin' Out" – 2:23
- "Turn the Cards Slowly" – 2:07
