= Patsy Cline (1961 EP) =

EP by Patsy Cline
- Released: August 14, 1961
- Recorded: January 27 – November 16, 1960
- Studio: Bradley Studios (Nashville, Tennessee)
- Genre: Country
- Label: Decca
- Producer: Owen Bradley

Patsy Cline chronology
Patsy Cline (1957)	Patsy Cline (1961)	Showcase (1961)

Patsy Cline is an EP released by American country music singer, Patsy Cline on August 14, 1961. It Cline's third EP to be released.

This was Cline's second EP to be self-titled. The EP contained two songs Cline had recorded under her last session from 4 Star Records ("There He Goes" and "Lovesick Blues") and two new songs recorded under new label, Decca Records ("I Fall to Pieces" and "Lovin' in Vain"). At the time of its release, Cline had released "I Fall to Pieces" as a single, where it had already reached No. 1 on the Billboard Country chart, and eventually No. 12 on the Pop chart. Two months prior, she had been involved in a serious automobile accident, therefore and album could not be released. Instead, Decca issued her first EP, containing "I Fall to Pieces."

The cover photograph was provided by photographer, Les Leverett.

== Track listing ==
Side 1:

1. "I Fall to Pieces" — (Hank Cochran, Harlan Howard) 2:47
2. "Lovin' in Vain" — (Freddie Hart) 2:14

Side 2:

1. "Lovesick Blues" — (Cliff Friend, Irving Mills) 2:25
2. "There He Goes" — (Durwood Haddock, Eddie Miller, W.S. Stevenson) 2:25

== Personnel ==
All recording sessions took place at Bradley Film and Music Studios in Nashville, Tennessee, United States.

- Harold Bradley — 6-string electric bass
- Patsy Cline — lead vocals
- Floyd Cramer — piano
- Jimmy Day — steel guitar
- Hank Garland — electric guitar
- Buddy Harman — drums
- Randy Hughes — acoustic guitar
- The Jordanaires — background vocals
- Ben Keith — steel guitar
- Doug Kirkham — drums
- Grady Martin — electric guitar, fiddle
- Bob Moore — acoustic bass
- Hargus "Pig" Robbins — piano
