= Frankie Miller (country musician) =

American country musician (1930–2026)

- Born: Frank Miller Jr. December 17, 1930; Victoria, Texas, U.S.
- Died: August 29, 2026 (aged 95) Arlington, Texas, U.S.
- Genre: Country music
- Occupations: Singer, Songwriter
- Labels: 4 Star Records; Columbia Records; Starday Records; United Artists; Bear Family Records; Heart of Texas Records
- Website: frankiemillercountry.com

Frank Miller Jr. (December 17, 1930 – August 29, 2026) was an American country singer.

== Life and career ==
Miller landed time as a teenager singing on local station KNAL and recorded for Gilt Edge a subsidiary of 4 Star Records at the beginning of the 1950s. He served from 1951 to 1953 in the United States Military during the Korean War, and was awarded the Bronze Star. In 1954 he signed with Columbia Records, releasing several singles. Through the latter portion of the decade, Miller performed and recorded locally, sporadically releasing singles.

He recorded his biggest hit "Blackland Farmer" for Starday Records in 1956, and released several other singles which became hits on the country charts, including "Family Man", "Baby Rocked Her Dolly", and "A Little South of Memphis". He was a regular performer on the Louisiana Hayride and the Grand Ole Opry, and was featured in Cashbox magazine where he was recognized in 1960 as "Most Promising New Country Male Vocalist". Frankie toured with Ernest Tubb, Patsy Cline, George Jones, Willie Nelson and many other country music legends.

Miller's last charting hit came in 1964, and he recorded with United Artists in 1965, but quit the music business soon after. He worked at a car dealership in Arlington, Texas later in life. In the 1980s, Bear Family Records reissued his LPs. He signed with Heart of Texas Records in 2005 and continued to perform well into his 80's including shows in England and Sweden. His last live performance was in Luck, Texas with Willie Nelson in 2021.

In July 2026, with the help of his son-in-law Greg Wilson, Miller released a biography about his time in the Country Music industry. The book is titled Frankie Miller: The Blackland Farmer - Life Among Country Music Legends.

Miller died at his home in Arlington, Texas, on August 29, 2026, at the age of 95.

== Singles ==
Year	Single	Chart Positions	
Year	Single	US Country	US
1959	"Black Land Farmer"	5	—
1959	"Family Man"	7	—
1960	"Baby Rocked Her Dolly"	15	—
1961	"Black Land Farmer" (re-release)	16	82
1964	"A Little South of Memphis"	34	—
