= Stop, Look and Listen (song) =

Single by Patsy Cline
- B-side: "I've Loved and Lost Again"
- Released: July 8, 1956
- Recorded: April 22, 1956
- Studio: Bradley Studios, Nashville, Tennessee
- Genre: Country; Rockabilly
- Label: Decca
- Songwriter(s): George London; W.S. Stevenson
- Producer(s): Owen Bradley

Patsy Cline singles chronology
"I Love You, Honey" (1956)	"Stop, Look and Listen" (1956)	"Walkin' After Midnight" (1957)

"Stop, Look and Listen" is a song by American country music singer Patsy Cline. It was composed by George London and W.S. Stevenson. It was released as a single in 1956 via Decca Records. The song has since received a positive response from critics and music writers.

== Background and content ==
Patsy Cline began her recording career in the mid-1950s with little success, having only one major hit during that decade. However, she recorded and released several singles. Of these singles was "Stop, Look and Listen.". The song was composed by George London and W.S. Stevenson. The song was recorded on April 22, 1956 at the Bradley Film and Recording Studio, located in Nashville, Tennessee. During the same session, Cline cut the songs "I've Loved and Lost Again," "Dear God" and "He Will Do for You (What He's Done for Me)". Her early recording sessions were produced by Owen Bradley, who would work with Cline through the rest of her career.

== Release and reception ==
"Stop, Look and Listen" was released on July 8, 1956 on Decca Records and was backed with the song, "I've Loved and Lost Again." The single was Cline's first release with the Decca label. She promoted the track on the Prince Albert segment of the Grand Ole Opry broadcast, which had been arranged by Ernest Tubb. Cline also promoted the single on the program Country Hoedown with fellow artist, Faron Young. The song did not become successful, which frustrated Cline. In a last-resort effort, she made the decision later in 1956 to audition for the national television show, Arthur Godfrey's Talent Scouts. "Stop, Look and Listen" has since received positive reception from music critics and journalists. Cub Koda of AllMusic praised Cline's performance on the track when reviewing a 1997 compilation, calling it "rocking." In another compilation review, Richie Unterberger called "Stop, Look and Listen" "the clear highlight" in comparison to the "stiff and inhibited" material found on the rest of the record.

== Track listing ==
7" vinyl single

- "Stop, Look and Listen"
- "I've Loved and Lost Again"
