= The Grass Is Greener (song) =

Single by Brenda Lee

from the album By Request
- B-side: "Sweet Impossible You"
- Released: 23 September 1963
- Genre: Pop
- Length: 2:25
- Label: Decca 31539
- Songwriter(s): Mike Anthony, Barry Mann

Brenda Lee singles chronology
"I Wonder" / "My Whole World Is Falling Down" (1963)	"The Grass Is Greener" (1963)	"As Usual" (1963)

"The Grass Is Greener" is a song written by Mike Anthony and Barry Mann and performed by Brenda Lee. The song reached #7 on the adult contemporary chart and #17 on the Billboard Hot 100 in 1963. The song is featured on her 1964 album, By Request. The song reached #73 in Australia.

The single's B-side, "Sweet Impossible You", reached #28 in the UK and #70 on the Billboard Hot 100.
