= My Whole World Is Falling Down =

1963 single by Brenda Lee

- Swedish release picture sleeve

Single by Brenda Lee

from the album By Request
- A-side: "I Wonder"
- Released: July 8, 1963
- Recorded: April 9, 1963
- Genre: Pop
- Length: 1:52
- Label: Decca
- Songwriters: Bill Anderson, Jerry Crutchfield
- Producer: Owen Bradley

Brenda Lee singles chronology
"Losing You" (1963)	"My Whole World Is Falling Down" (1963)	"The Grass Is Greener" (1963)

Audio
- "My Whole World Is Falling Down" on YouTube

"My Whole World Is Falling Down" is a song written by Bill Anderson and Jerry Crutchfield and performed by Brenda Lee. Its chorus is based on the nursery rhyme "London Bridge Is Falling Down". The song reached #8 on the Adult Contemporary chart and #24 on the Billboard Hot 100 in 1963. The song is featured on her 1964 album, By Request. The song also reached #16 in Australia.

Lee's recording of the song appeared in the 1982 Costa-Gavras film Missing.

== Sylvie Vartan version (in French) ==
"Si je chante"

Single by Sylvie Vartan

from the album À Nashville
- Language: French
- English title: If I sing
- Released: December 1963
- Recorded: Late 1963
- Genre: Pop
- Length: 2:19
- Label: RCA Victor

Sylvie Vartan singles chronology
"Twiste et chante" (1963)	"Si je chante" (1963)	"La plus belle pour aller danser" (1964)

Music video
- "Si je chante" on YouTube

Sylvie Vartan released a French version titled "Si je chante" (meaning "If I sing") as part of an eponymous EP in December 1963.

In France her version of the song spent three weeks on the singles sales chart (from 18 to 31 January and from 8 to 14 February 1964).

=== Charts ===
Chart (1963–1964)	Peak position
Belgium (Ultratop 50 Wallonia)	6
France (singles sales)	1
Spain Promusicae	1
Swiss Hitparade	8

== See also ==
- List of number-one singles of 1964 (France)
