= As Usual =

- Swedish release picture sleeve

Single by Brenda Lee

from the album By Request
- B-side: "Lonely Lonely Lonely Me"
- Released: November 1963
- Recorded: 25 October 1963
- Genre: Country
- Length: 2:32
- Label: Decca 31570
- Songwriter: Alex Zanetis

Brenda Lee singles chronology
| "The Grass Is Greener" (1963) | "As Usual" (1963) | "Think" (1964) |

"As Usual" is a song written by Alex Zanetis and performed by Brenda Lee. The song is featured on Lee's 1964 album, By Request.

== Chart performance ==
The song reached No.12 on the Billboard Hot 100 and No.5 on the adult contemporary chart in the United States. It reached No.5 on the U.K. singles chart and No.12 on the Australian chart in 1964. The single was the 49th best-selling 45 rpm disc of 1964 in the U.K.
