= KWAY (Oregon) =

KWAY (1570 AM) was a radio station located in Forest Grove, Oregon, which broadcast from December 20, 1950, to October 31, 1965. Its license was deleted on February 4, 1966. Singer Susan Raye auditioned at this station in 1961. The station’s previous call signs were KFGR & KRWC.
