= LAX color tunnels =

Los Angeles airport underground passenger access tunnels with mosaic murals

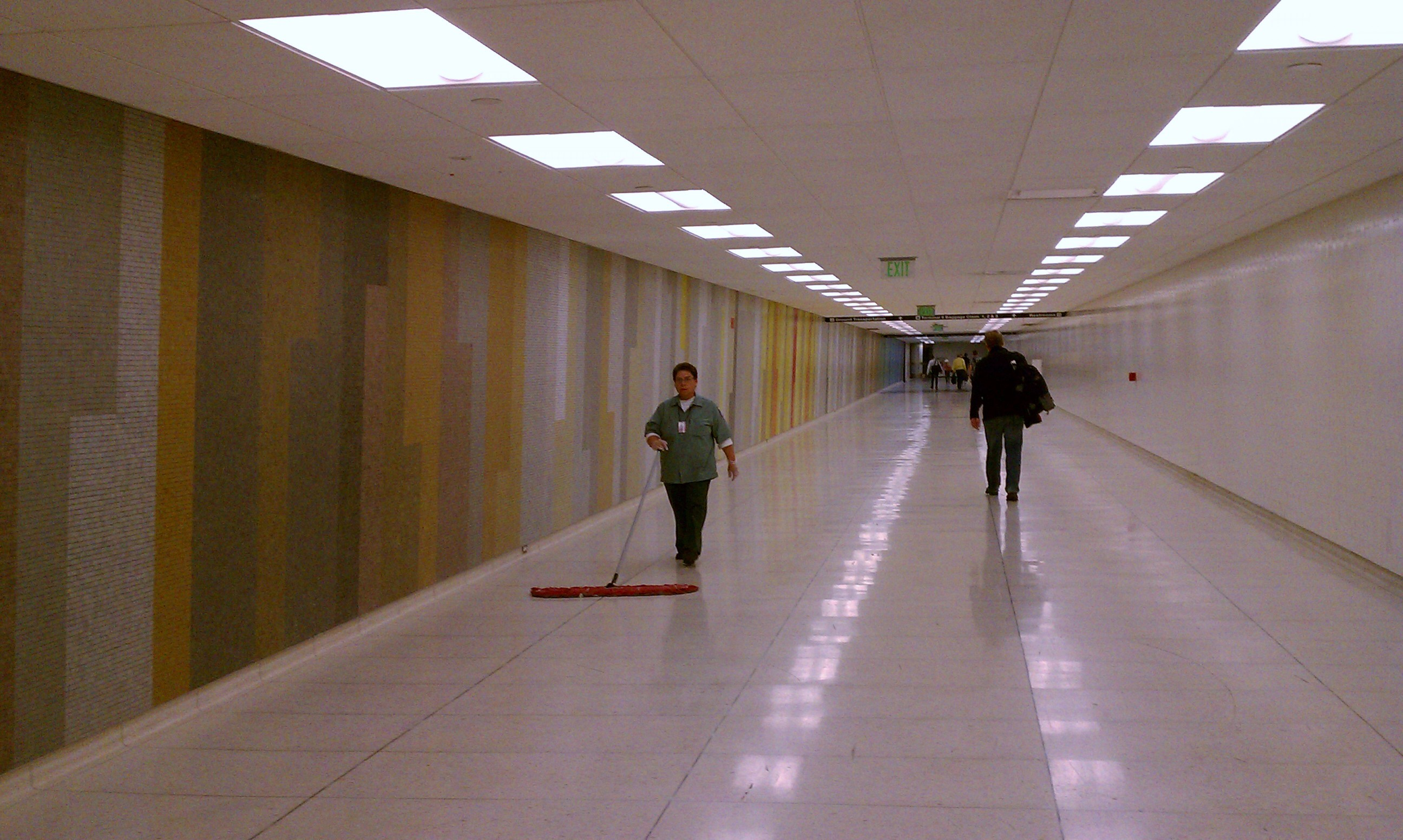
Tunnel under LAX Terminal 6

LAX Terminal 4 color tunnel

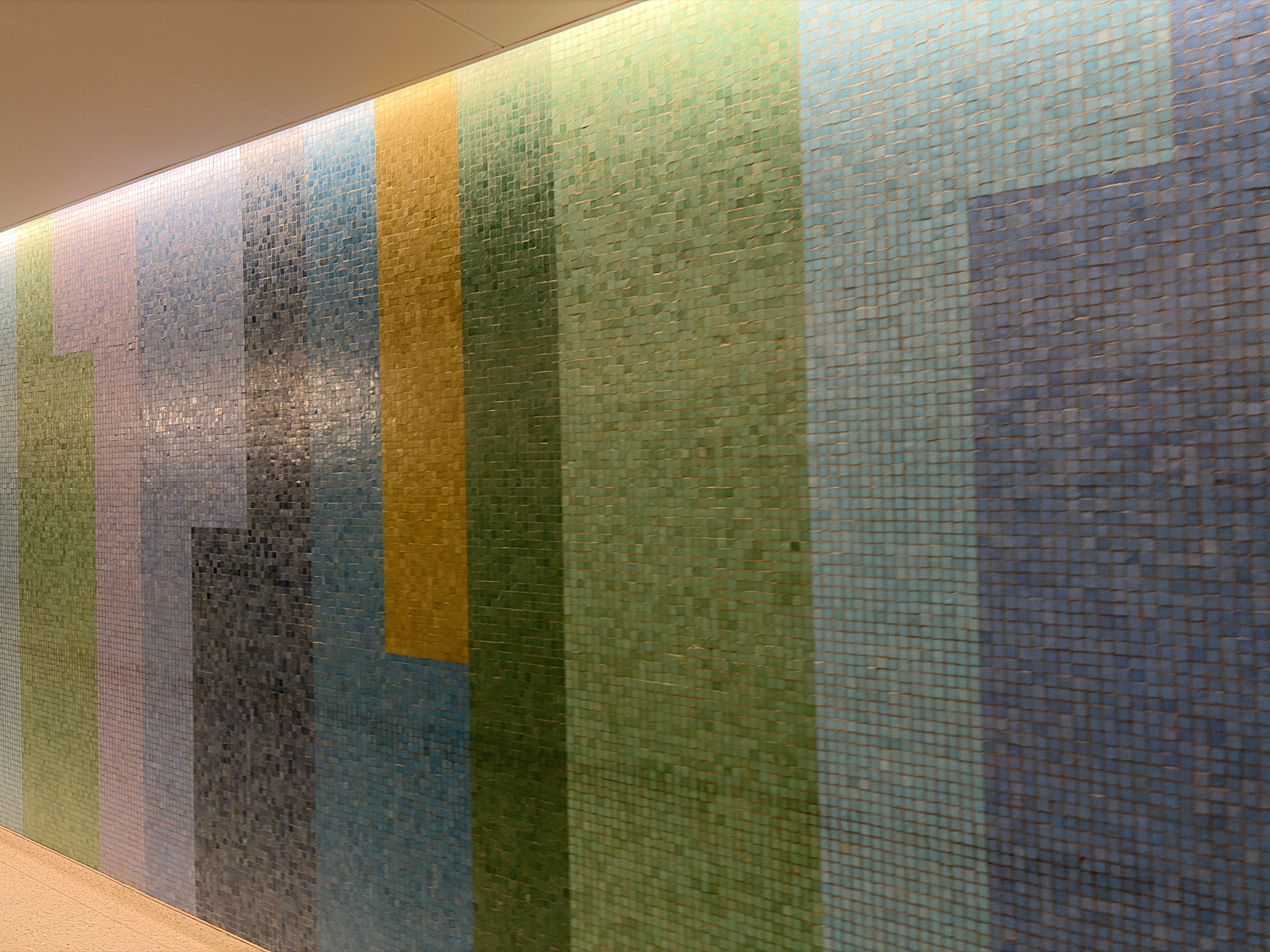
LAX Terminal 4 color tunnel

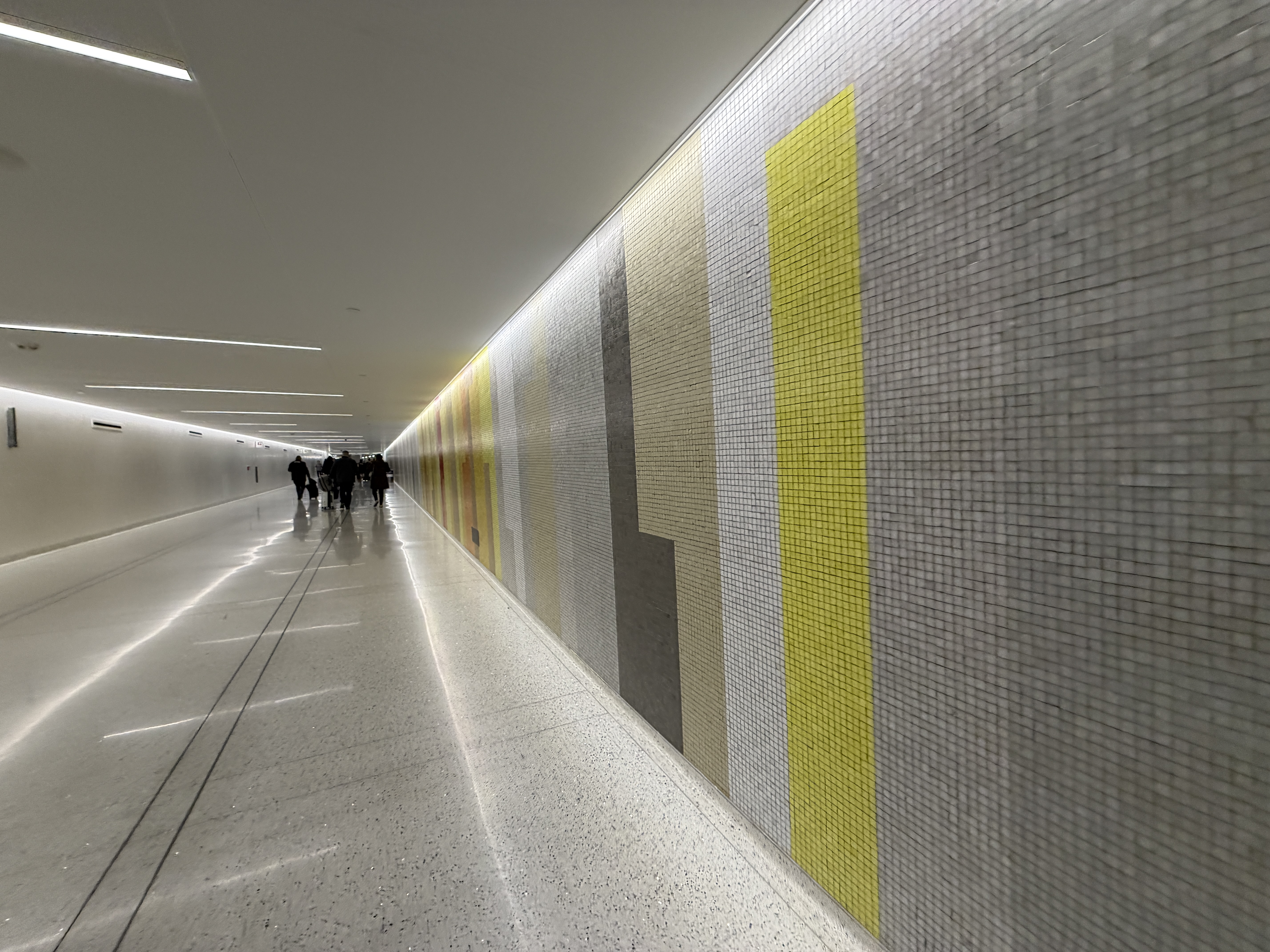
LAX Terminal 4 color tunnel

Decorative mosaic decor was installed in several tunnels built in 1961 at the Los Angeles International Airport (LAX), United States. Seven tunnels were created, three remain open to the public.

Designed in the 1950s, the tunnels were envisioned by the architecture firm Pereira & Luckman, to minimize the experienced distance of the 300-to-500-foot-long (91 to 152 m) tunnels. The work was overseen by Charles D. Kratka, the firm's head of interior design and they were designed by Janet Bennett, then a young artist on his team. The tiles were produced by Alfonso Pardinas of Byzantine Mosaics in San Francisco.

== Tunnels ==
Six color tunnels were created for LAX. As of 2025, four of the tunnels remain largely in their original condition, and three are currently open to the public. Five of the colorful mosaic tile designs have been preserved.

The tunnel connecting Terminal 3's rotunda to baggage claim was closed during major renovations between 2020 and 2024, but its mosaic was preserved and has since reopened following the completion of the new terminal. The tunnel connecting Terminal 4 to its baggage claim area remains in use and is historically significant for featuring one of the earliest moving walkways ever constructed, nicknamed the "Astrowalk." Similarly, the tunnels at Terminals 5 and 6 continue to serve passengers and retain much of their original character. Terminal 7’s tunnel was expanded and repurposed as a Customs and Border Protection (CBP) facility for processing arriving international travelers, with its mosaic preserved.

The only tunnel that has been demolished is the one formerly connecting Terminal 2 to its baggage claim area. It was removed to make way for a CBP processing facility.

In addition to the main color tunnels, smaller connecting tunnels were built between Terminals 4, 5, 6, and 7. The passages linking Terminals 4, 5, and 6 remain open to passengers transferring between terminals. However, the tunnel from Terminal 6 to Terminal 7 now functions as a "sterile corridor," reserved for international passengers arriving at Terminal 6 who must proceed to customs at Terminal 7.

Terminals 1 and 8 were never constructed with connecting tunnels.

Terminal 7 color tunnel

== Legacy ==
The hallways with their extensive tile-mosaic walls have appeared in a number of films and television programs, sometimes as symbolic funnels or liminal spaces. The tunnels appeared in When Harry Met Sally..., Jackie Brown, Airplane!, and Mad Men, among many others. In 2013, a Portland, Oregon, company called The Athletic produced color-blocked tile-mosaic mural LAX Airport Socks.
