= I Wonder (1944 song) =

1944 single by Cecil Gant

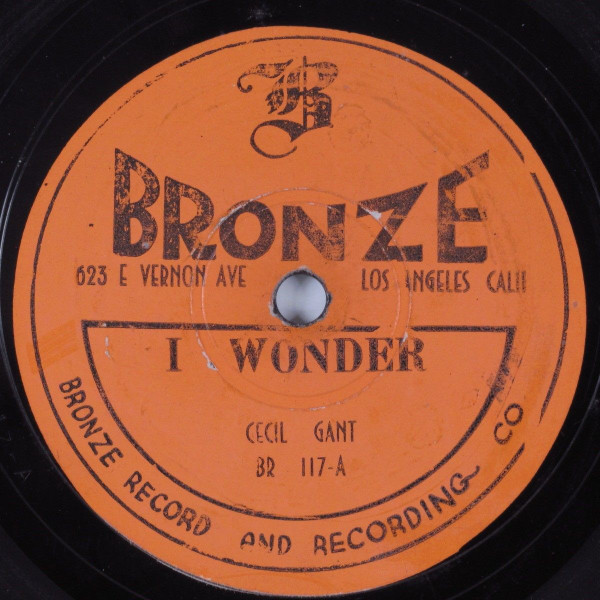

Single by Cecil Gant
- B-side: "My Last Goodbye"
- Released: 1944
- Length: 2:44
- Label: Bronze
- Songwriter(s): Cecil Grant, Raymond Leveen

Cecil Gant singles chronology
"Cecil's Mop Mop" (1944)	"I Wonder" (1944)	"Wake-Up, Cecil, Wake-Up" (1944)

"I Wonder"

Single by Brenda Lee

from the album By Request
- B-side: "My Whole World Is Falling Down"
- Released: June 1963
- Recorded: 1963
- Genre: Pop
- Length: 2:55
- Label: Decca
- Songwriter(s): Cecil Grant, Raymond Leveen

Brenda Lee singles chronology
"If You Love Me (Really Love Me)" (1963)	"I Wonder" (1963)	"My Whole World Is Falling Down" (1963)

"I Wonder" is a 1944 song written and originally performed by Pvt. Cecil Gant. The original version was released on the Bronze label, before Gant re-recorded it for the Gilt-Edge label in Los Angeles. The record made it to number one on the Juke Box Race Records chart and was Pvt. Gant's most successful release. In February 1945, pianist, Roosevelt Sykes hit number one with his version of the song. Sykes' version is notable in that it replaced Gant's version, at number one on the Juke Box Race Records chart.

== Other cover versions ==
- Also in 1945, vocalist Warren Evans reached number six on the Juke Box Chart with his version of song.
- Also in 1945, Louis Armstrong recorded his own version of "I Wonder" which peaked at number three on the Juke Box Chart.
- Brenda Lee released a version as the B-side of "My Whole World Is Falling Down" in July 1963. It reached No. 25 on the Billboard Hot 100 later that year.
- Etta Jones included it on her 1962 album Lonely and Blue.
- Vikki Carr - Color Her Great! (1963).
- Aretha Franklin from the album Aretha Arrives (1967).
- Tony Bennett and k.d. lang – A Wonderful World (2002)

== See also ==
- List of Billboard number-one R&B singles of the 1940s
