= Gilt-Edge (record label) =

Gilt-Edge was a short-lived American record label in Los Angeles, California. It was founded by Richard A. Nelson in 1944 and remained active until March 1946 when it was subsumed into 4 Star Records; another record company to which Nelson was attached.

Gilt-Edge was primarily a race record company which had a target audience of African-Americans. Artists who made records with them included blues musician Cecil Gant and jazz musician Wingy Manone. However, the record label also had other types of musicians in its roster, including country singer Frankie Miller. Gilt-Edge's artists were transferred to 4 Star Records when it ceased operation.
