= Patsy Cline (album) =

Studio album by Patsy Cline
- Released: August 5, 1957
- Recorded: January 5, 1956 – May 23, 1957
- Genre: Country; traditional pop
- Length: 29:31
- Label: Decca (1957); MCA (reissued: 1988)
- Producer: Owen Bradley

Patsy Cline chronology
Songs by Patsy Cline (1957)	Patsy Cline (1957)	Showcase (1961)

Singles from Patsy Cline
- 1. "Walkin' After Midnight" Released: February 11, 1957; 2. "Three Cigarettes in an Ashtray" Released: August 12, 1957; 3. "Then You'll Know" Released: November 18, 1957

Professional ratings
Review scores
Source	Rating
Allmusic	4/5 stars

Patsy Cline is the debut studio album by American country music singer, Patsy Cline, released on August 5, 1957. This would be one of three studio albums Cline would record during her lifetime.

== Background ==
Cline's debut album produced two singles. Her first single "Walkin' After Midnight," was released in 1957 and became both a Top 20 pop smash and a classic. However, she could not follow up the success of "Walkin' After Midnight"; and the second single from the album, "I Don't Wanta," failed to chart. Cline would not have another major hit or studio album until 1961. Her flip side of "Walkin' After Midnight," "A Poor Man's Roses," was not featured on the album.

Although Cline recorded for the 4 Star Records label, the album was released on Decca Records, the future recording company of Cline from late 1960 to her death in 1963, where she would issue two studio albums. The album was later digitally remastered for a release as a [CD/LP/Cassette] on MCA Records (which took over Decca in 1973) in 1988, using the original album cover.

== Recording ==
Recording began as early as January 1956 and ended as late as May 23, 1957. Because the album was released on Decca, it was produced by Owen Bradley, who would later produce all of Cline's sessions between 1960 and 1963. Background vocals were done by the Nashville background vocal group, The Anita Kerr Singers, who also backed a number of popular country music artists in the 1950s and 60s.

== Individual tracks ==
Cline recorded 12 songs for the album, a mix of honky tonk, rockabilly, and country pop. Many music critics have called the tracks very different from the other material she recorded for her later albums. One of the songs, "Don't Ever Leave Me Again," was co-written by Cline with James Crawford and Lillian Claiborne. Cline used her real name, Virginia Hensley, in the songwriting credits.

== Appearances in other media ==
The song "Three Cigarettes (In an Ashtray)" appears in the Grand Theft Auto: San Andreas video game soundtrack, on the fictitious radio station K-Rose.

== Track listings ==
=== 1957 original LP version ===
Side 1

1. "That Wonderful Someone" (Gertrude Burg) – 2:26
2. "In Care of the Blues" (Eddie Miller, W.S. Stevenson) – 2:33
3. "Hungry For Love" (Eddie Miller, W.S. Stevenson) – 2:25
4. "Too Many Secrets" (Bobby Lile) – 2:14
5. "Don't Ever Leave Me Again" (Lillian Claiborne, Virginia Hensley, James Crawford) – 2:25
6. "Ain't No Wheels on This Ship" (Wayland Chandler, W.S. Stevenson) – 1:53

Side 2

1. "I Can't Forget" (Carl Belew, W.S. Stevenson) – 2:25
2. "I Don't Wanta" (Durwood Haddock, Eddie Miller, W.S. Stevenson) – 2:17
3. "Three Cigarettes in an Ashtray" (Eddie Miller, W.S. Stevenson) – 2:11
4. "Walkin' After Midnight" (Donn Hecht, Alan Block) – 2:33
5. "Fingerprints" (Woodie O. Fleener, Donn Hecht, W.S. Stevenson) – 2:43
6. "Then You'll Know" (Bobby Lile) – 3:12

=== 1988 CD version ===
1. "That Wonderful Someone" – 2:27
2. "In Care of the Blues"
3. "Hungry Love" – 2:27
4. "Too Many Secrets" – 2:14
5. "Don't Ever Leave Me Again" – 2:26
6. "Ain't No Wheels In this Ship (We Can't Roll)" – 1:55
7. "I Can't Forget You" – 2:25
8. "I Don't Wanta" – 2:20
9. "Three Cigarettes In An Ashtray" – 2:12
10. "Walkin' After Midnight" – 2:33
11. "Fingerprints" – 2:44
12. "Then You'll Know" – 3:12

== Charts ==
Singles – Billboard (North America)

Year	Single	Chart	Position
1957	"Walkin' After Midnight"	Country Singles	2
1957	"Walkin' After Midnight"	Pop Singles	12
