= Cecil Gant =

American blues musician (1913–1951)

Background information
- Also known as: Pvt. Cecil Gant "The G.I. Sing-sation"; Gunter Lee Carr
- Born: April 4, 1913; Columbia, Tennessee, United States
- Died: February 4, 1951 (aged 37) Nashville, Tennessee, U.S.
- Genres: R&B, blues, boogie-woogie
- Occupations: Singer, pianist, songwriter
- Years active: 1930s–1951
- Labels: Bronze, Gilt-Edge, King, Bullet, Down Beat, Swing Time, Imperial, Decca

Cecil Gant (April 4, 1913 (Note: The application for his military headstone gives a birth date of February 25, 1911, but his death certificate and most secondary sources state April 4, 1913.) – February 4, 1951) was an American blues singer, songwriter and pianist, whose recordings of both ballads and "fiery piano rockers" were successful in the mid- and late 1940s, and influenced the early development of rock and roll. His biggest hits were the 1944 ballad, "I Wonder," and “We’re Gonna Rock” (1950).

== Biography ==
Gant was born in Columbia, Tennessee, but was raised in Cleveland, Ohio. He returned to Nashville, Tennessee and worked there as a musician, as well as touring with his own band, from the mid-1930s until he joined the army during World War II. In 1944, after performing at a War Bond rally in Los Angeles, California, he recorded his composition "I Wonder" for the tiny black-owned Bronze record label. When it started to become locally popular, he re-recorded it for the newly established white-owned independent Gilt-Edge record label. His recording of "I Wonder" was released under the name "Pvt. Cecil Gant", as were later releases on the label.

The Gilt-Edge release of "I Wonder" sold well. It reached number one on the Billboard Harlem Hit Parade (the former name of the R&B chart), and number 20 on the national pop chart (as synthesized by Joel Whitburn); and its B-side, the instrumental "Cecil Boogie", reached number 5 on the R&B chart. Gant wrote most of his own songs. Billed as "The GI Sing-sation", his two follow-up records on Gilt-Edge, "The Grass Is Getting Greener" and "I'm Tired", also made the R&B chart. Arnold Shaw identified "I Wonder" as the song that "ignited the postwar blues explosion", and the success of Gant's records helped stimulate the establishment of other independent labels immediately after the war.

He also released material through King Records (1947), and recorded for Bullet Records in Nashville until 1949. His 1948 recording of "Nashville Jumps" opens the 2004 compilation Night Train to Nashville. The co-founder of Bullet, Jim Bulleit, said of Gant:

He drank too much... He would say, "I want to do a session" when he ran out of money. We would get a bass player and a guitarist and get him a piano, and I'd go sit in the control room, and he'd tinkle around on it, and then he'd say "I'm ready," and tap that bottle; and if we didn't get it the first time, we didn't get it, 'cause he couldn't remember what he did. He'd dream up and write a song while he sat there, and he'd give me the title of it. And the uniqueness of the thing is that all of them sold.

In 1949 he returned to Los Angeles, and recorded for the Down Beat and Swing Time labels, before moving to New Orleans to record for Imperial Records in 1950, but with diminishing commercial success. Many of Gant's records had a slow ballad as the A-side but an up-tempo boogie woogie style piano-based song or instrumental as the B-side, in many cases foreshadowing rock and roll and influential on its practitioners. Examples include "We're Gonna Rock" (1950) and "Rock Little Baby" (1951). On some of his later records, Gant was credited, for unknown reasons, as Gunter Lee Carr.

In latter years Gant was married and based in Nashville. He died there in 1951, at the age of 37, while preparing to leave for an engagement in Clarksdale, Mississippi. Although some sources give the cause of death as pneumonia, contemporary sources refer to a heart attack, possibly brought on by Gant's alcoholism. He is buried in Highland Park Cemetery in Cleveland, Ohio.

== Compilation albums ==
- I'm Still Singing The Blues Today (Oldie Blues)
- I Wonder: The Best of Cecil Gant 1944–1948 (P-Vine Records)
- We're Gonna Rock (Indigo UK)

== See also ==
- List of Boogie-Woogie musicians
- List of artists who reached number one on the Billboard R&B chart
- List of number-one rhythm and blues hits (United States)
- R&B number-one hits of 1945 (USA)
- First rock and roll record
