= L.A. International Airport =

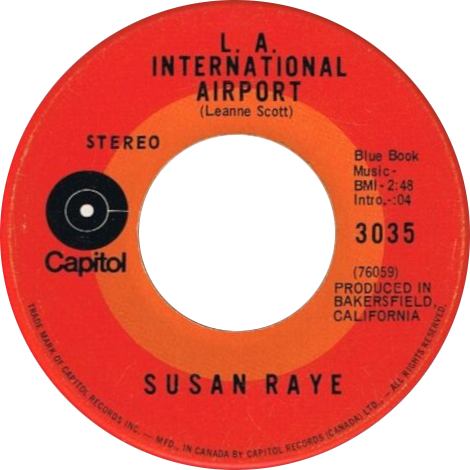
- Side A of the Canadian single

Single by Susan Raye

from the album Willy Jones
- B-side: "Merry-Go-Round of Love" (U.S.); "Willy Jones" (Germany); "Something to Forgive Him For"
- Released: April 1971
- Recorded: 1971
- Genre: Country/Pop
- Length: 2:48
- Label: Capitol
- Songwriter: Leanne Scott

Susan Raye singles chronology
"Willy Jones" (1970)	"L.A. International Airport" (1971)	"Pitty, Pitty, Patter" (1971)

"L.A. International Airport" is a song by Susan Raye. It was written by Leanne Scott and first recorded in 1970 by David Frizzell. It was released in April 1971, and reached No. 67 on the Billboard Country Singles chart.

== Susan Raye recording ==
Susan Raye recorded her version of the song in 1971, which became an international hit. It reached #9 on the Billboard Country Singles chart. On other charts, "L.A. International Airport" reached #54 on the Billboard Hot 100. The song enjoyed much greater success outside of America and was a major pop hit in many countries, including New Zealand where it hit number one, and in Australia where it peaked at number two and ranked in the top five hits of the year.

The song was rerecorded with updated lyrics in 2003 by Shirley Myers for the 75th Anniversary of LAX. Susan Raye, who has been retired from the music industry since 1986, made a rare public appearance to sing her hit at a concert at the celebration and to be on hand when a proclamation was issued to make the song the official song of LAX.

=== Weekly singles charts ===
Chart (1971)	Peak position
Australia (Kent Music Report)	2
Canadian RPM Top Singles	83
Canadian Country	26
New Zealand (Listener)	1
U.S. Billboard Hot 100	54
U.S. Cash Box Top 100	92
U.S. Billboard Country	9

=== Year-end charts ===
Chart (1971)	Rank
Australia (Kent Music Report)	5
U.S. Billboard Hot 100	335
