= Susan Raye =

American country music singer (born 1944)

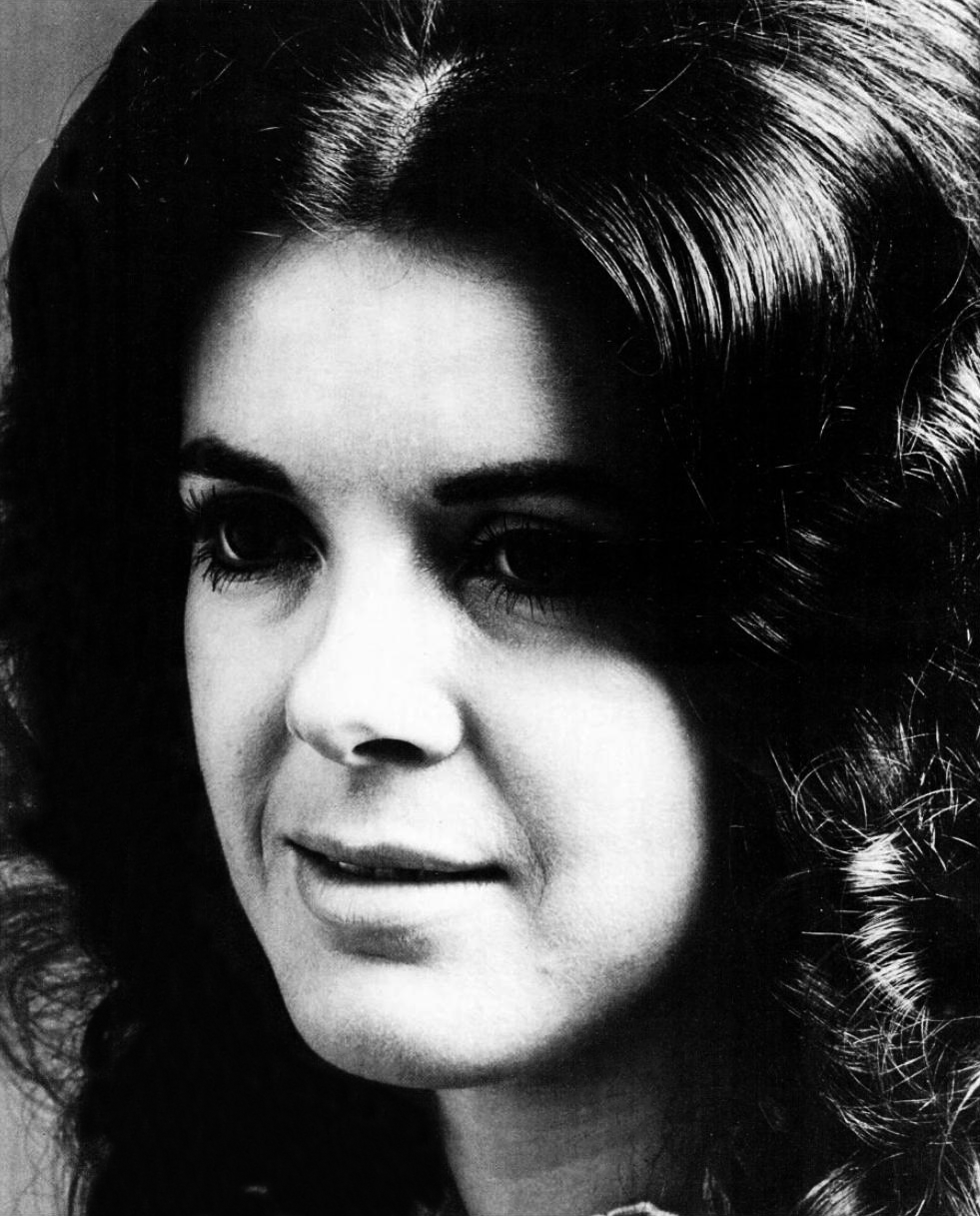
- Raye in 1973

Background information
- Born: October 8, 1944 (age 81); Eugene
- Origin: Eugene, Oregon, U.S.
- Genres: Country
- Occupation: Singer
- Years active: 1969–1986
- Labels: Capitol Nashville; United Artists; Westexas

Susan Raye (born October 8, 1944) is an American country music singer. She enjoyed great popularity during the early and mid-1970s, and chalked up seven top-10 and 19 top-40 country hits, most notably the song "L.A. International Airport", an international crossover pop hit in 1971.

Raye was a protegee of country music singer Buck Owens. Owens and Raye recorded a number of hit albums and singles together, and were one of the most successful country duet acts of the era, in addition to their solo careers.

== Early life ==
=== Years before success ===
She was born in Eugene, Oregon, United States. Raye first began singing with a high-school rock group, but in 1961, after the band called it quits, she auditioned for a local country station, KWAY (previously KFGR/KRWC). She performed on the station's live Saturday morning country and western show. Not only did she begin performing on the radio, but she also landed work as a disc jockey, eventually becoming the host of a Portland TV program called Hoedown. At one of Raye's performances at an area nightclub, she met Jack McFadden, Buck Owens' manager. McFadden was so impressed with her vocal talents that he persuaded Owens to fly her to his home in Bakersfield, California, for an audition.

=== Rise to success ===
She moved to Bakersfield and began singing with Owens in 1968, and soon after, she cut her first recordings. One of these songs, "Put a Little Love in Your Heart," made the top 30 in 1970. At about the same time, she began a nine-year stint as a featured performer on the program Hee Haw.

== Country music career ==
=== 1970–1975: Breakthrough into the industry ===
Susan Raye's first sessions as Buck Owens's duet partner were released in 1970. The albums We're Gonna Get Together and The Great White Horse were top-20 hits that year, as were the title tracks to each album and a third single, "Togetherness". The song "The Great White Horse" peaked at number eight and was the most successful Owens-Raye duet.

Raye's biggest year as a solo artist came in 1971, when she issued three consecutive top-10 hits: "L.A. International Airport", "Pitty, Pitty, Patter", and "(I've Got A) Happy Heart". The title track of 1972's My Heart Has a Mind of Its Own also reached the top 10.

Although not her biggest country hit, "L.A. International Airport" became Raye's signature song, peaking at number 9 on the Billboard Country Chart, and a minor hit on the Billboard Hot 100, peaking at number 54. The record was a major international pop hit in several countries, however, enjoying its greatest success in New Zealand, where it hit number one for two weeks, and in Australia where it hit number two and ranked as the number-five best-selling pop record of the year, outselling Lynn Anderson's country crossover international smash "Rose Garden" (in Australia only). "Airport" did well in the Record World "Non-Rock" chart, while strangely failing to appear in Billboard's comparable "Easy Listening" Top 40. In 2009, Raye donated one of the two gold records she earned for "L.A. International Airport" to the Flight Path Museum in Los Angeles.

Raye became the first woman to become a major country artist without recording in Nashville, a feat previously accomplished only by male stars such as Owens and Merle Haggard. Raye was nominated for five Academy of Country Music Awards, three times as "Top Female Vocalist". Raye married Owens' drummer Jerry Wiggins in 1972. They were married for over 40 years until his death in 2018.

Raye had an additional two top-20 country hits in 1972 from separate albums, "Wheel of Fortune" and "Love Sure Feels Good in My Heart". In 1973, Raye's next album, Cheating Game, spawned two singles, one of which (the title track) reached number 18 on the Billboard Country Chart that year. The second single, "When You Get Back from Nashville", was not as successful and peaked outside country's top 40. That same year, Raye and Owens reunited for an album, The Good Old Days (Are Again), and together they had a top-40 hit from the album. In 1974, Raye's album Singing Susan Raye also released a top-20 hit, a remake of "Stop the World (And Let Me Off)".

Raye's 1975 release "Whatcha Gonna Do With a Dog Like That", became her seventh top-10 on the Billboard Country Chart and a duet single with Buck Owens, "Love is Strange", placed in the top 20 that year. In 1976, however, Owens severed his ties with Capitol Records and closed down his Bakersfield unit for the label. Susan Raye released her final album on Capitol in 1976, Honey Toast and Sunshine, her first recording session in Nashville.

=== 1977–1984: Later career ===
Raye signed with United Artists Records at the end of 1976 and released one album on the label produced by George Richey, which spawned four charting singles, the most successful of which peaked at number 51. It was Raye's last studio album issued from a major record label. In the late 1970s, Raye dropped out of the music business, citing family and religion as her reasons. Her version of the traditional hymn "Precious Memories" was used in the opening and closing credits of the 1979 film Hardcore.

Returning to the recording studio for the first time in eight years, Susan Raye released the album There and Back in 1985, which produced two more chart singles on Billboard. An additional album, Then and Now, was released in 1986. The A-side of the album featured updated re-recordings of Raye's biggest hits. The songs on the B-side were gospel/contemporary Christian songs. This album is Raye's last recording to date.

In 2020, Craft Recordings released two vinyl LPS of Raye's hits, one of them a duet collection with Owens. These collections were previously released on CD by other labels.

== Other careers since music ==
Raye is a devout Christian. She went to California State University, Bakersfield, and received a bachelor's degree in psychology and a master's degree in education school counseling. She has been completely retired from show business since 1986.

Raye returned to LAX on August 6, 2003, during its 75th anniversary year. She performed the song "L.A. International Airport", with a Bakersfield band and backup vocalists, to an enthusiastic outdoor crowd from the airport community.

== Awards and nominations ==
Year	Awards	Award	Outcome
1969	Academy of Country Music Awards	Most Promising Female Vocalist	Nominated
1970	Academy of Country Music	Most Promising Female Vocalist	Nominated
1971	Music City News Awards	Most Promising Female Vocalist	Won
1971	Academy of Country Music	Top Female Vocalist	Nominated
1972	Academy of Country Music	Top Female Vocalist	Nominated
1973	Academy of Country Music	Top Female Vocalist	Nominated
