= Walkin' After Midnight =

Single by Patsy Cline

from the album Patsy Cline
- B-side: "A Poor Man's Roses (Or a Rich Man's Gold)"
- Released: February 11, 1957
- Recorded: November 8, 1956
- Studio: Bradley Studios, Nashville, Tennessee
- Genre: Country
- Length: 2:32
- Label: Decca
- Songwriters: Alan Block; Don Hecht
- Producers: Owen Bradley; Paul Cohen

Patsy Cline singles chronology
"Stop, Look and Listen" (1956)	"Walkin' After Midnight" (1957)	"Today, Tomorrow and Forever" (1957)

Audio sample
- An editor has nominated the above file for discussion of its purpose and/or potential deletion. You are welcome to participate in the discussion and help reach a consensus.: file; help

"Walkin' After Midnight" is a song written by Alan Block and Don Hecht. The song was originally given to pop singer Kay Starr, but her label rejected it. The song was left unused until Hecht rediscovered it when writing for 4 Star Records. The first released recording was by Lynn Howard with the Accents, released in August 1956. It was later recorded by American country music singer Patsy Cline in November 1956 and released as a single in February the following year. Originally, Cline was not fond of "Walkin' After Midnight", but after making a compromise with her label, she recorded it.

In January 1957, Cline performed the song on an episode of the CBS television program Arthur Godfrey's Talent Scouts. It garnered a strong response from viewers, so was rush-released as a single on February 11, 1957. "Walkin' After Midnight" became Cline's first major hit single, reaching number two on the Billboard country music chart and number 12 on its pop chart. Although the song was her only hit until 1961, the single version sold over one million copies and is often included on authoritative lists of the all-time greatest songs in country music.

In 2020, the 1957 release was inducted into the Grammy Hall of Fame.

== Background and composition ==
Alan Block and Donn Hecht wrote the song in 1954, a few years before Cline recorded it. According to Hecht, after securing a songwriting contract with 4 Star Records, his assignment was to pick an artist from the label for whom he could compose a song. Hecht was impressed by Cline's vocals, and realized her voice was best suited to pop music. Among his catalog of pop-styled songs was "Walkin' After Midnight", originally intended for traditional pop artist Kay Starr, and written in the key of B-flat. Starr's record label had rejected the original version, and it was left unused for years. Hecht pawned his furniture, had a demonstration tape made with singer Lynn Howard, and played the demo for Cline's producer, who then played it to Cline over the telephone.

Her first reaction to "Walkin' After Midnight" was negative, and Hecht and 4 Star owner Bill McCall agreed with her. The compromise was that Cline would record it as long as she could also record "A Poor Man's Roses (Or a Rich Man's Gold)", a song she favored. "Walkin' After Midnight" was then recorded at the Bradley Film and Recording Studio on November 8, 1956, and was produced by Paul Cohen (with assistance from Owen Bradley), along with "A Poor Man's Roses", "The Heart You Break May Be Your Own", and "Pick Me Up on Your Way Down".

"Walkin' After Midnight" is a country pop song with stylistic elements taken from the genres of jazz, traditional pop, and blues. The song was recorded in the key of C major and follows the traditional AABA form followed by a short instrumental solo and a repeat of sections B and A. "Walkin' After Midnight" features instrumentation from an acoustic guitar, basic drums, piano, steel guitar, electric guitar, and acoustic bass. Its session members were part of The Nashville A-Team of musicians, who played on most of the recording sessions on RCA Victor and Decca Records. Among the musicians were Harold Bradley, Grady Martin, and Bob Moore, all of whom played on Cline's later records in the early 1960s. Don Helms, formerly of Hank Williams' band the Drifting Cowboys, played the steel guitar.

== Reception ==
=== Critical reception ===
Alanna Nash of the book Will the Circle Be Unbroken? Country Music in America, called "Walkin' After Midnight" "bluesy"; Richie Unterberger of Allmusic also praised the song, calling its beat "bouncy" and its overall sound different from rockabilly and country music of the time. Unterberger went on to say, "While Cline's vocal is a little restrained in comparison with the approach she used on her better-known sides in the early 1960s, it's well-suited for the almost bemused aura of loneliness of the lyric. More than any of the other songs she recorded for the 4 Star label in the 1950s, it anticipates the successful country-pop fusion of her crossover hits for Decca in the early 1960s."

=== Impact and chart performance ===
On January 21, 1957, Cline was invited to perform a song on the CBS television program hosted by Arthur Godfrey entitled, Arthur Godfrey's Talent Scouts, a talent competition made up of rising young, unknown professionals. She originally intended to perform "A Poor Man's Roses (Or a Rich Man's Gold)" on the show, but the producers preferred "Walkin' After Midnight." Against her wishes, Cline performed the song during the program's 8:30 pm slot. The excessive audience applause froze the show's applause meter, and Cline won first place on that night's show. Because of the strong response, Decca Records (4 Star leased their music to Decca) released "Walkin' After Midnight" as a single on February 11, 1957. It quickly debuted on the Billboard charts, eventually peaking at number two on the Hot Country Songs chart and number 12 on the pop chart by March 3. "A Poor Man's Roses (Or a Rich Man's Gold)" was released as the single's B-side, also charting on the Billboard country chart at number 14. Because "Walkin' After Midnight" had become a significant hit, Decca issued Cline's debut album August 5, 1957, simply titled, Patsy Cline. The album, however, did not contain the flip side.

Cline later re-recorded "Walkin' After Midnight" for Decca with a more "pop" arrangement that featured backing vocals and a pronounced "clip clop" percussion effect, as well as a modulation to the key of C# for the final verse. Although this version is sometimes heard as an "oldie" on country playlists, it is not the version that was the hit single. Cline's vocals from this recording were overdubbed with a jazzier arrangement for the soundtrack of Cline's biopic Sweet Dreams.

== Track listing ==
7" vinyl single

- "Walkin' After Midnight" – 2:32
- "A Poor Man's Roses (Or a Rich Man's Gold)" – 2:45

== Personnel ==
Original 1956 recording

- Harold Bradley – acoustic guitar
- Owen Bradley – associate producer, piano
- Farris Coursey – drums
- Don Helms – steel guitar
- Tommy Jackson – fiddle
- Grady Martin – electric guitar
- Bob Moore – acoustic bass
- Paul Cohen – producer

Re-recorded 1961 version

- Harold Bradley – 6-string electric bass
- Owen Bradley – producer
- Floyd Cramer – organ
- Buddy Harman – drums
- Walter Haynes – steel guitar
- Randy Hughes – acoustic guitar
- The Jordanaires – backing vocals
- Grady Martin – electric guitar
- Bob Moore – acoustic bass
- Hargus "Pig" Robbins – piano

== Charts ==
=== Weekly charts ===
Chart (1957)	Peak position
Australia Top 100 Singles (Kent Music Report)	33
US Hot 100 (Billboard)	12
US Hot Country Singles (Billboard)	2
