= Paul Cohen (music producer) =

American record producer and executive (1908–1970)

- Born: November 10, 1908; Chicago, Illinois, U.S.
- Died: April 1, 1970 (aged 61); Bryan, Texas, U.S.
- Occupations: Record producer; publishing company executive; talent scout
- Years active: late 1920s - 1969
- Known for: Association with record labels: Columbia Records; Decca Records; Kapp Records; ABC Records
- Honours: Country Music Hall of Fame

Paul Cohen (November 10, 1908 – April 1, 1970) was an American country music producer. Cohen was a long-time Decca Records executive who played a key role in Nashville's emergence as the country music recording capital development of the Nashville Sound. As President of the Country Music Association (CMA), Cohen was on hand when the Country Music Hall of Fame opened in 1967.

== Career ==
Cohen first entered the record business with Columbia in the late 1920s, but in 1934 joined Decca Records' newly formed American operation, organized by two brothers, Jack and Dave Kapp—old Chicago friends of his. Cohen moved to Cincinnati to become Decca's midwestern branch manager in 1935; in this role he was responsible for scouting, producing and signing new talent in addition to marketing records. During World War II, he gradually took over Decca's hillbilly production work from Dave Kapp, and in the mid-1940s moved to New York to head that branch of the company.

In 1947, after the Castle Studios were established in the Tulane Hotel at Eighth Avenue North and Church Street in Nashville, Cohen moved the bulk of Decca's country recording there. Two of Decca's biggest country acts—Ernest Tubb and Red Foley—were based at the Grand Ole Opry in Nashville, so Cohen decided it made far more financial and practical sense for him to travel to and stay in Nashville for extended periods of time than for Decca to pay to have the artists and their bands travel to Cincinnati or New York City for recording sessions. Musicians Owen Bradley and Beasley Smith helped Cohen schedule his intensive three- to four-week Nashville visits by lining up artists, session musicians, and arrangements in advance. Noting Bradley's studio skills, Cohen hired him to open Decca's Nashville offices. In the early 1950s, Cohen considered moving Decca's country headquarters to Dallas, where Jim Beck had a recording studio, but Bradley persuaded Cohen to keep Decca's country division in Nashville by building Bradley Studios in 1954.

Cohen is remembered for an energetic production style—as much cheerleader as executive—and a knack for spotting new artists and matching them with songs (often published by his own publishing companies). Kitty Wells, Webb Pierce, Brenda Lee, Patsy Cline, and Bobby Helms were among the new acts signed and produce by Cohen during his tenure, while Tubb, Foley, Jimmie Davis, and others continued to have success with the label.

Cohen left Decca's country department early in 1958 (succeeded by Bradley shortly thereafter), and did pop production for Decca's Coral subsidiary. Soon after that Cohen launched his own company, Todd Records, and besides signing such country acts as Pee Wee King and Dub Dickerson, the label enjoyed a pop hit, Joe Henderson's "Snap Your Fingers".

In 1964 Cohen rejoined his old boss Dave Kapp as head of Kapp Records' country division in Nashville. In four years at Kapp, Cohen signed and produced Hugh X. Lewis, Cal Smith, Billy Edd Wheeler, and Mel Tillis, among others. Cohen's last major executive position was as head of ABC Records Nashville office (1968–1969), which he left after being diagnosed with cancer. He died in Bryan, Texas, on April 1, 1970, and was buried in nearby College Station, Texas. In an unprecedented gesture, Nashville's Music Row offices closed for a memorial service a week later (April 7), but the lasting testimony to his memory and importance came with his posthumous election to the Country Music Hall of Fame in 1976.
