= Owen Bradley =

American record producer (1915–1998)

- Born: William Owen Bradley; October 21, 1915; Westmoreland, Tennessee, U.S.
- Died: January 7, 1998 (aged 82) Nashville, Tennessee, U.S.
- Genre: Country
- Occupations: Musician; record producer; recording studio founder; songwriter; radio director; radio and TV producer; arranger
- Instrument: Piano
- Years active: 1935–1980
- Label: Decca Records
- Formerly of: Ernest Tubb; Chet Atkins; Bob Ferguson; Burl Ives; Red Foley; Kitty Wells; Patsy Cline; Brenda Lee; Loretta Lynn; Conway Twitty; Moon Mullican; Paul Cohen

William Owen Bradley (October 21, 1915 – January 7, 1998) was an American musician, bandleader and record producer who, along with Chet Atkins, Bob Ferguson, Bill Porter, and Don Law, was one of the chief architects of the 1950s and 1960s Nashville sound in country music and rockabilly.

== Early life ==
Bradley was born in Westmoreland, Tennessee on October 21, 1915, and grew up in Nashville, Tennessee . His father was Vernon Bradley, and his mother was Letha Maie Owen. By the time he was fifteen he had learned to play several instruments and was playing piano in local nightclubs and roadhouses.

== Career ==
In 1935 at the age of 20, Bradley got a job at radio station WSM, home of the Grand Ole Opry, where he worked as a musician and arranger. In 1942, he became WSM's musical director, and was also the leader of a sought-after dance band that played society parties all over Nashville. That same year Bradley co-wrote Roy Acuff's hit "Night Train to Memphis". His involvement with his dance band continued until 1964, though in the intervening decades, his work as a producer would far overshadow his career as a performer and band leader.

In 1947, Bradley was hired by the head of Decca Records' country music division, Paul Cohen. Bradley worked as a music arranger and songwriter during the Castle Studio recording sessions of some of the biggest talents of the day, including Ernest Tubb, Burl Ives, Red Foley and Kitty Wells. He produced both Foley's 1950 hit "Chattanoogie Shoe Shine Boy" and Wells' 1952 hit "It Wasn't God Who Made Honky Tonk Angels", along with hits by Bill Monroe and Webb Pierce. Noting Bradley's studio skills, Cohen later utilized Bradley to open Decca's Nashville offices.

In the early 1950s, Owen and his brother Harold, seeking to capitalize on the rising popularity of television, experimented with assembling a production studio, eventually establishing a studio near 21st Avenue South in the Hillsborough Village area, where they produced industrial films for Genesco and others. When Cohen told Bradley that he was considering moving Decca's country headquarters to Dallas, where Jim Beck had a recording studio, Bradley offered to build a new Nashville studio.

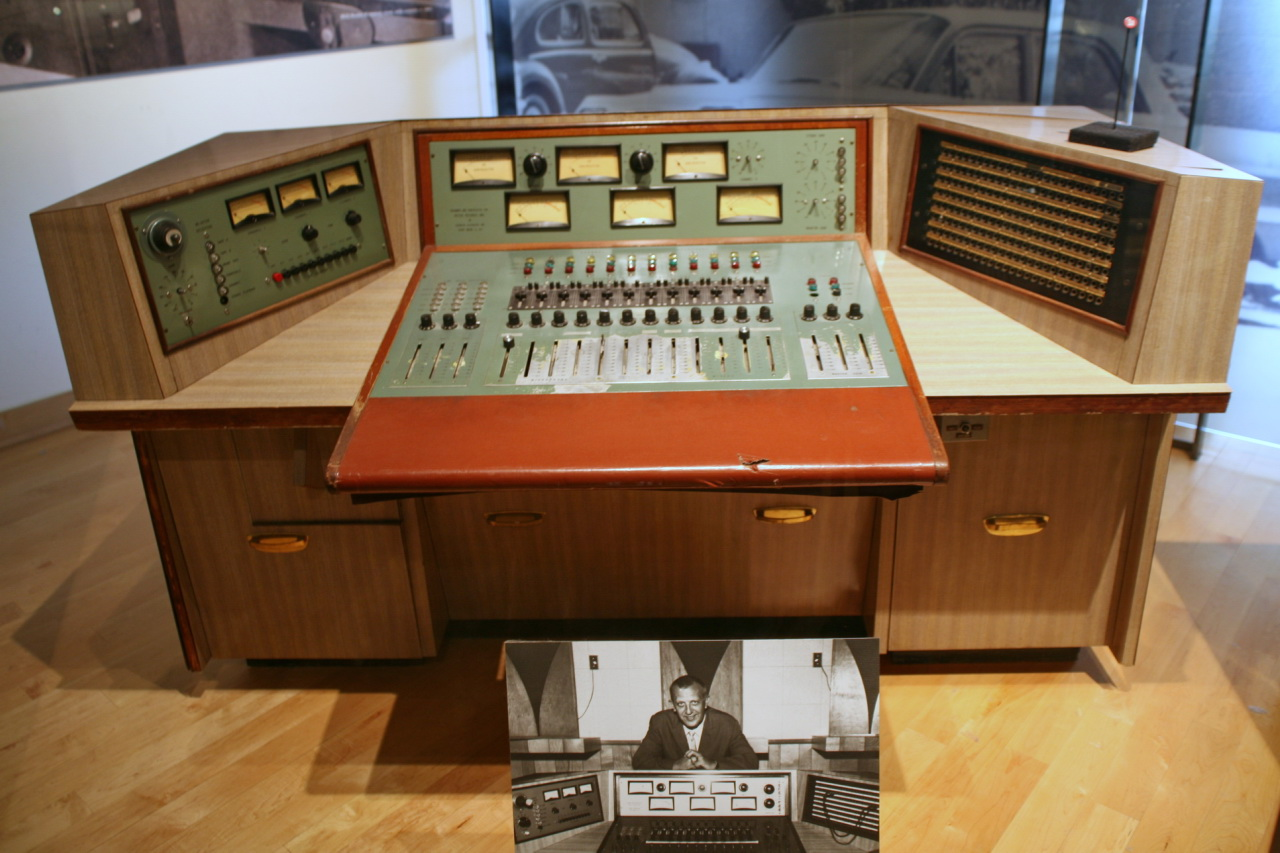
Owen Bradley's Quonset Hut Studio console

In 1954, Bradley and his brother purchased a house at 804 16th Avenue South in Nashville for $7500 and remodeled it to create Music City Recording, the first recording studio in what would become Music Row. They bought an Army surplus Quonset hut and attached it to the back of the house to use as a sound stage for filming musical performances, and changed the studios' name to Bradleys' Film & Recording Studios in 1957, though it was commonly referred to as the "Quonset hut studio." The Bradleys produced several Country Style, USA film programs in the Quonset hut studio, but the demand for recording music in the Quonset hut (which was much larger than the house's basement studio) eventually overtook the Bradley's film production business,

Bradley's studio was an instant success, recording hits by several Decca artists as well as hits for Capitol, Columbia, MGM, and other record labels. The studios' success spurred RCA Victor to build its RCA Studio B, and a handful of other record labels and music publishers soon followed, setting up shop on what would eventually become known as Music Row.

In 1958, Bradley succeeded Cohen as head of Decca's Nashville division, and began pioneering what would become the "Nashville Sound".

== The Nashville sound ==
Country music had long been looked on as unsophisticated and folksy, and was largely confined to listeners in the less affluent small towns of the American South and Appalachia. In the late 1950s, Bradley's home base of Nashville was positioning itself to be a center of the recording industry, and not just the traditional home of the Grand Ole Opry. Developed with the contributions of Owen Bradley's crew of hand-picked musicians, including Harold Bradley, Grady Martin, Bob Moore, Hank Garland and Buddy Harman, known collectively as Nashville's "A-Team". The success of Bradley and his contemporaries infused hokey melodies with more refined lyrics, and blended them with a refined pop music sensibility to create the "Nashville Sound", known later as "countrypolitan". Light, easy listening piano (as popularized by Floyd Cramer) replaced the clinky honky-tonk piano (ironically, one of the artists Bradley would record in the 1950s was honky tonk blues singer pianist, Moon Mullican - the Mullican sessions produced by Bradley were experimental in that they merged Moon's original blues style with the emerging Nashville Sound stylings). Lush string sections took the place of the mountain fiddle sound; steel guitars and smooth backing vocals rounded out the mix.

Regarding the Nashville sound, Bradley stated, "Now we've cut out the fiddle and steel guitar and added choruses to country music. But it can't stop there. It always has to keep developing to keep fresh."

== Starmaker ==
The singers Bradley produced made unprecedented headway into radio, and artists such as Kitty Wells, Patsy Cline, Brenda Lee, Loretta Lynn, Lenny Dee, and Conway Twitty became household names. Rock and Roll singers such as Buddy Holly and Gene Vincent also recorded with Bradley in his Nashville studio. Bradley often tried to reinvent older country hitmakers; as previously mentioned, he tried to update Moon Mullican's sound and produced one of Moon's best performances "Early Morning Blues" where the blues and the Nashville sound complement each other surprisingly well. Also, he produced Bill Monroe in both bluegrass and decidedly non-bluegrass settings (Monroe's covers of Jimmie Rodgers' "Caroline Sunshine Girl" and Moon Mullican's "Mighty Pretty Waltz", for example, feature a standard country band rather than bluegrass). Many older artists recognized they needed to change as they saw former pure honky tonk singer, Jim Reeves, blend his own style with the newer styles with great success. However, not everyone was as successful as Reeves or Patsy Cline in these transformations. In addition to his production, Bradley released a handful of instrumentals under his own name, including the minor 1958 hit "Big Guitar".

== Bradley's Barn studio ==
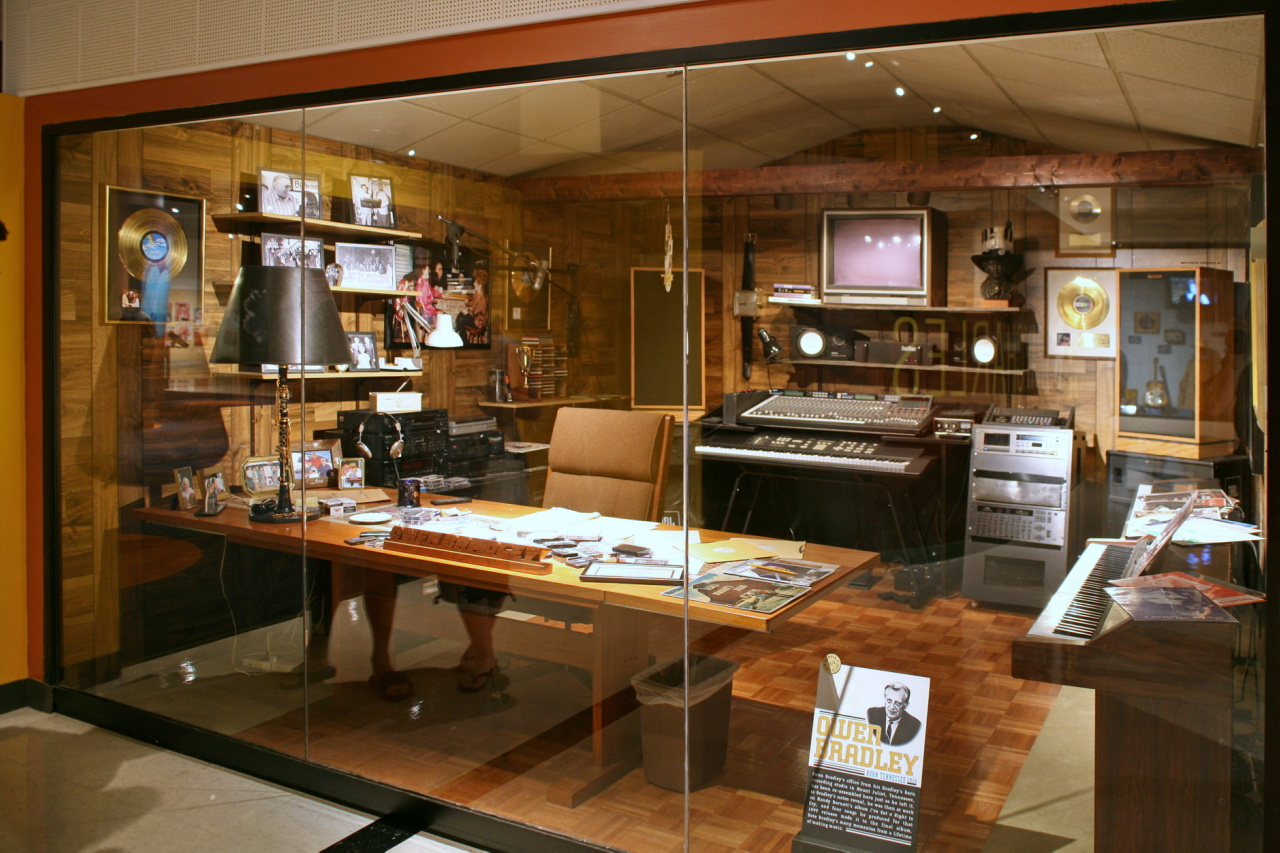
Owen Bradley's final studio

Bradley sold The Quonset Hut Studio to Columbia Records and bought a farm outside of Nashville in Mount Juliet, Tennessee in 1961, converting a barn into a demo studio which he named Bradley's Barn. Within a few years, Bradley's Barn became a popular recording venue in country music circles. The Beau Brummels paid tribute to the studio, through titling their 1968 album Bradley's Barn. The studio burned to the ground in 1980, but Bradley rebuilt it within a few years in the same location.

== Later years and honors ==
Owen Bradley was inducted in 1974 to the Country Music Hall of Fame. He also achieved the distinction of having produced records for more fellow Hall of Fame members (six) than anyone else except Paul Cohen who produced nine. He retired from production in the early 1980s, but continued to work on selected projects.

Canadian artist k.d. lang chose Bradley to produce her acclaimed 1988 album, Shadowland. He died on January 7, 1998, in Nashville. At the time of his death, he and Harold were producing the album I've Got A Right To Cry for Mandy Barnett, who is best known for her portrayal of Patsy Cline in the original Nashville production of the stage play, Always... Patsy Cline.

His production of Cline's hits such as "Crazy", "I Fall to Pieces" and "Walkin' After Midnight" remain standards of the country music genre. It is his work with Cline and Loretta Lynn for which he is best known, and when the biopics Coal Miner's Daughter and Sweet Dreams were filmed, Bradley was chosen to direct their soundtracks.

In 1997, the Metro Parks Authority in Nashville dedicated a small public park between 16th Avenue South and Division Street to Owen Bradley, where his bronze likeness sits at a bronze piano. Owen Bradley Park is at the northern end of Music Row. Bradley also has a section of roadway named after him where Bradley's Barn once stood in Mt. Juliet, Tennessee, on Benders Ferry Road.

Bradley was inducted into the Musicians Hall of Fame and Museum upon receiving the 2019 Producer Award.

== Legacy ==
Owen Bradley is part of what is known as "The First Family of Music Row." His younger brother and business partner Harold Bradley became one of the world's most recorded session guitarists, and served as longtime president of the Nashville chapter of the American Federation of Musicians.

Owen's daughter Patsy worked over 40 years with BMI, eventually as assistant vice president of writer/publisher administration. His son Jerry worked for his Forest Hills Music music publishing company before becoming head of RCA Records' Nashville office in 1973, succeeding Chet Atkins. In his later career, he was head of the Opryland Music Group during its return to prominence following Gaylord Entertainment's acquisition of the Acuff-Rose Music catalog. Jerry's wife, Connie Bradley, worked with ASCAP's Nashville office for more than 30 years beginning in the mid-1970s, eventually as Senior Vice President. Jerry’s son, Clay Bradley, currently serves as the Vice President of Creative at BMI (Variety, 2020) (Source). His two grandchildren, John Owen Bradley and Lillian Grace Bradley, work in the music industry and have reopened Bradley’s Barn as of 2025. (MusicRow, 2024; MusicRow, 2025) (Source 1, Source 2).

== See also ==
- The Nashville A-Team

== Bibliography ==
- Oermann, Robert K. (1998). "Owen Bradley" In The Encyclopedia of Country Music. Paul Kingsbury, Ed. New York: Oxford University Press. pp. 50–51.
- Richliano, James Adam (2002). "Angels We Have Heard: The Christmas Song Stories." Star Of Bethlehem Books, Chatham, New York. (Includes interviews with Bradley and chapters on Bradley's involvement in the making of "Jingle Bell Rock", "Rockin' Around the Christmas Tree", and "A Holly Jolly Christmas").
