= 4 Star Records =

American record label

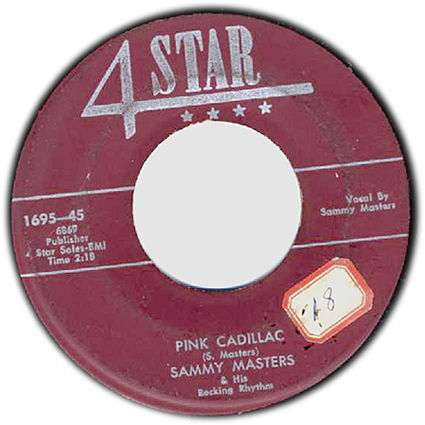
4 Star 45rpm record label

4 Star Records was an American record label that recorded many well-known country music acts in the 1950s. The label, founded after World War II, was home to singers such as Hank Locklin, Maddox Brothers and Rose, Rose Maddox, Webb Pierce, Cousin Ford Lewis and T. Texas Tyler, who all regularly issued records on the label, mostly as 78 rpm singles.

== Label history ==
The label was founded in 1945 by William A. "Bill" McCall Jr., Clifford McDonald, and Richard A. Nelson. By November 1946, McCall was in complete control of 4 Star. Although record labels give a Hollywood, California address, the actual address was on 800 Western Avenue in Los Angeles until 1949, when operations were moved to Pasadena, California.

Besides country music, 4 Star also recorded blues, jazz (Wingy Manone, Slim Gaillard, and Charles Mingus), rhythm and blues (such as Ivory Joe Hunter's "Pretty Mama Blues", Cecil Gant's remake of his hit "I Wonder" and Ed "The Great" Gates), rockabilly (Paul Littlechief's "Come On Darlin'") and Latin music recordings. 4 Star re-released hillbilly boogie guitarist Porky Freeman's 1945 hit "Boogie Woogie On Strings" in 1948, and Charlie Ryan re-recorded his 1955 hit "Hot Rod Lincoln" for the label in 1959. Smokey Rogers (as 'Buck Rogers & His Texans', 1946-1947), Terry Fell (later of "Truck Drivin' Man" fame, 1947), Ferlin Husky (as 'Terry Preston', 1949-1950), Billy Jack Wills (youngest brother of Bob Wills, 1951), Ramblin' Tommy Scott (1955), and Sammy Masters (1956) were also 4 Star recording artists.

4 Star released their music on 78 rpm (later on 45 rpm) discs in three numerical series: the main 1000-series (1000 to 1765), the X-series (1 to 100) and the P-series (101 to 112).

In the late 1970s, producer Joe Johnson headed up an organization that purchased 4 Star Records and moved all of its operations to Nashville, Tennessee. Johnson insisted on building state-of-the-art studios and bringing in the best talent available to run them. 4 Star hired the successful record producer, Steve Clark, who in turn brought to 4 Star a stable of talented artists and writers, including Barbara South, Debi Bass, and Joe Nelson.

Several chart records were produced, including Debi Bass' "Till I'm Strong Enough to Love Again" and "I Need a Hero", both written by Joe Nelson. 4 Star's financial problems continued to mount; in the early 1980s the company was closed, and the catalogue absorbed by its creditors. Sony/ATV Music Publishing owns the catalogue today.

== Patsy Cline ==
On September 30, 1954, singer Patsy Cline signed a recording contract with 4 Star. However, none of Cline's subsequent recordings for 4 Star appeared on the 4 Star label; instead they appeared on Decca Records, and Decca's subsidiary Coral Records, under a special licensing agreement through 4 Star. Cline's 4 Star contract expired on September 30, 1960, at which point Decca was able to take full advantage of Cline's services in the two-and-a-half years left to her.

== See also ==
- List of record labels
- Gilt-Edge (record label)
