= Nashville Boogie Vintage Weekender =

Annual music festival in Tennessee, U.S.

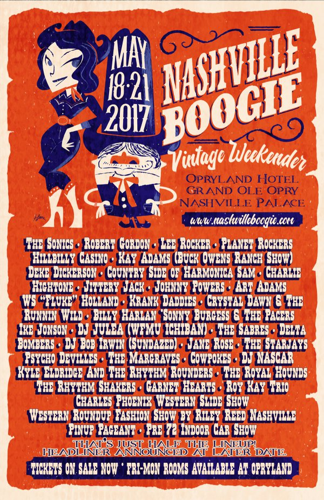
- Genre: Rockabilly, Psychobilly, Americana, country, R&B, bluegrass,
- Dates: Third Thursday in May, duration of four days
- Locations: Nashville, Tennessee, U.S.
- Years active: 2015–2021
- Attendance: 10,000 +
- Organizer: Muddy Roots Music
- Website: Official website

The Nashville Boogie Vintage Weekender is an American annual four-day music festival and celebration of mid-century American culture, vintage clothes, old cars, early country/rockabilly/R&B music, pinup models, and western wear founded by Jason Galaz of Muddy Roots Music. Since its first year in 2015, it has been held at Gaylord Opryland Resort in Nashville, Tennessee. The festival typically starts on the third Thursday in May and lasts four days. The main attractions of this festival are the multiple stages featuring live music with a diverse array of musical styles including rockabilly, psychobilly, R&B and country music. The event also hosts a vintage car show, vintage clothing shopping, and the Western Roundup Fashion Show.

== Notable performances ==
Chris Isaak (2015), Ronnie Spector (2019), The B-52s, JD McPherson, Wanda Jackson and The Cactus Blossoms, The Sonics, Robert Gordon (2017) and hundreds of other performers over the years.

== Western Roundup Fashion Show ==
In addition to music, the festival features a fashion show showcasing western wear designers from across the United States including Jerry Lee Atwood, Manuel Cuevas, Barrie Kaufman and many other notable fashion and costume designers..

== See also ==
- List of historic rock festivals
- List of music festivals
