= Patsy Cline Museum =

Museum in Nashville, Tennessee, United States

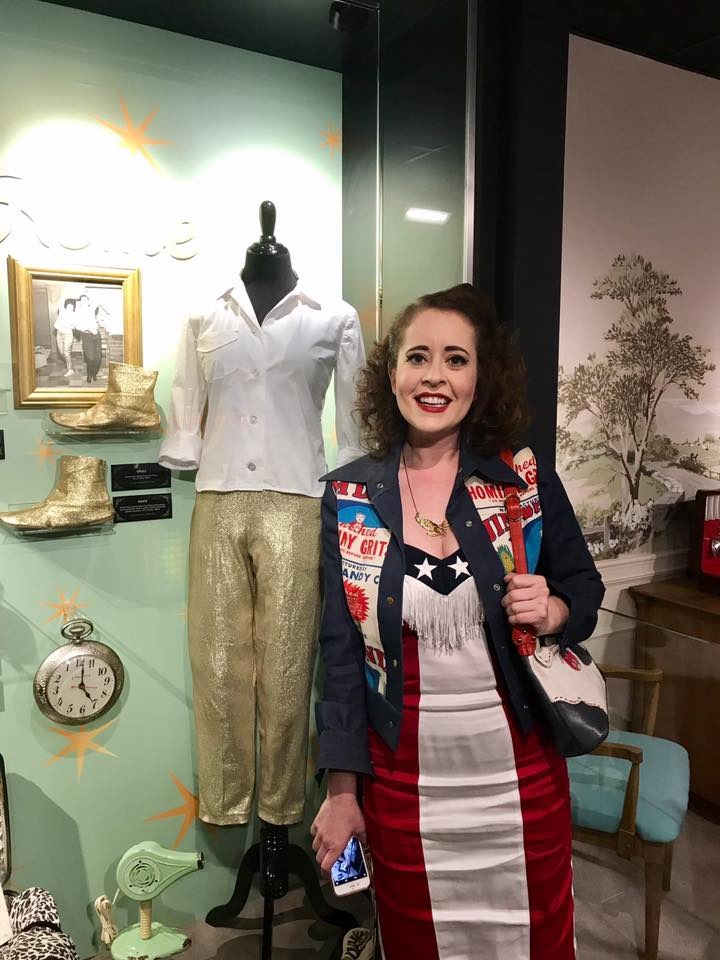
- Fashion designer Barrie Kaufman, who reproduced the clothes for the exhibits
- Location: 119 3rd Avenue South; Nashville, Tennessee 37201
- Coordinates: 36.1609042°N 86.7786054°W
- Owner: Johnny Cash Museum

The Patsy Cline Museum was a museum that opened on April 7, 2017, on the second floor of the Johnny Cash Museum building on Third Avenue South in Nashville, Tennessee. It was home to an extensive collection of Patsy Cline memorabilia as well as real-life artifacts once owned by the country singer, who died in a plane crash in 1963 at the age of 30.

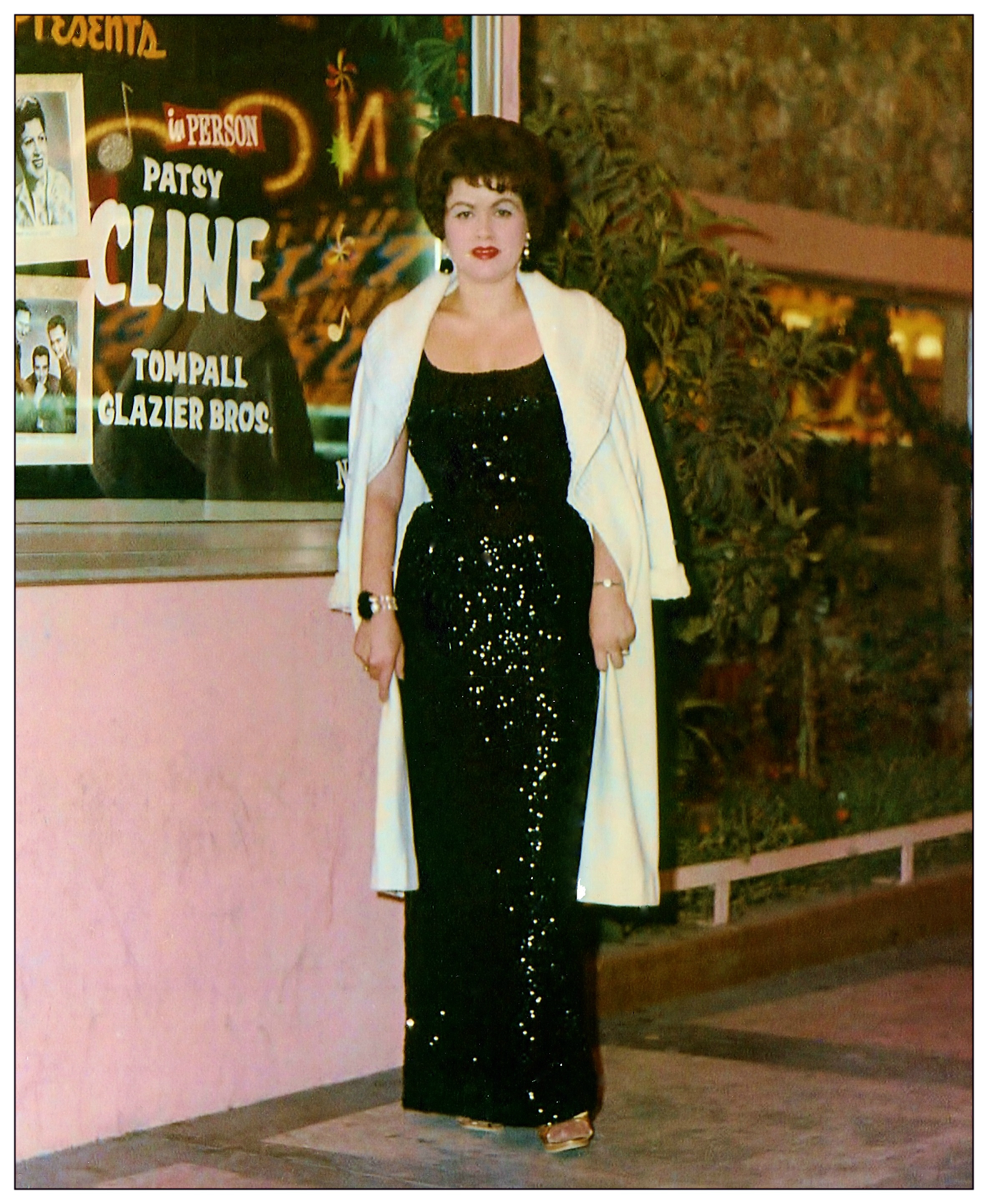
Patsy Cline at the Mint Casino in Las Vegas, Nevada. Circa 1962

== History ==
Born Virginia Patterson Hensley, Patsy Cline recorded three studio albums and had two number one songs on the country music chart before her untimely death, but death didn't actually stop her rise to fame. Her recorded music continued to chart, and her fan base continued to grow in the decades following her death, and she became the first female inducted into the Country Music Hall of Fame – 10 years posthumously.

Shannon and Bill Miller, who also founded the Johnny Cash Museum, wanted to create a similar museum for Patsy Cline. They had the opportunity to do so after Charlie Dick – Patsy Cline's husband – died in 2015, leaving behind a collection of his and Patsy's belongings that he had previously kept hidden away.

== Location ==
The 4,000-square-foot museum was located in the SoBro (South of Broadway) neighborhood on Third Avenue South in Nashville. It was open daily, with exceptions for Thanksgiving and Christmas. Admission was free for children under age 6, and children 6 to 15 pay reduced admission prices. Limited parking was available nearby on the surrounding streets.

== Exhibits ==
The Patsy Cline Museum focused on the relatively modest life Cline and her family led, in spite of her growing success and fame. Her husband, Charlie Dick, saved a lot of her personal possessions, including the sewing machine used by Cline's mother, Hilda Hensley, to sew the signature cowgirl costumes she wore early in her career, a custom cigarette lighter, and her salt and pepper shaker collection. He also kept the telegram he received from Colonel Tom Parker – Elvis Presley's manager – offering condolences after Cline's death.

The halls in the museum include several exhibits that focus on specific stages in Cline's life. For example, one exhibit includes the sign, a wooden booth, and a milkshake maker from the pharmacy – Gaunt's Drug Store – where she worked during her teen years in Winchester, Virginia. Visitors can also see the porch seat from her childhood home in that same town. A recreated version of the dining room in the home she later shared with Charlie Dick in Nashville includes her Filter Queen vacuum cleaner and the canceled check she used to buy it. A replica of the home's rec room includes a hi-fi console and record player, various vinyl LPs, and a reel-to-reel tape player along with a black and white TV playing Cline's performances and a Norge refrigerator that still works. The red padded faux leather bar in the room has "Patsy & Charlie" printed on it.

Interactive stations allowed visitors to listen to Cline's music, watch clips of her performances, and read full copies of some of her handwritten letters. Many recognizable stage costumes, such as the sequined dress from her series of shows at Mint Casino in Las Vegas in 1962, were on display throughout the museum. Some of the costumes were designed by Cline herself and sewn by her mother.

Various mementos were on display in the museum, including a large number of items that personally belonged to Cline and a few that tend to have an emotional impact, such as the Elgin watch – a gift from her husband – worn by Cline at the time of her death, her silver engraved wedding ring, the ID bracelet (with photos inside) that she gave to Charlie Dick, and the handkerchief used by her mom at her funeral. An AMI jukebox commemorates Cline's two songs that are on the list of Top 20 Jukebox Hits of All Time: #1 "Crazy" and #17 "I Fall to Pieces".

Other exhibits include:

- Wall of 45s displaying both A and B sides
- Key to New York City given to Cline by Mayor Robert F. Wagner in 1961
- Canceled check used to pay the deposit for the furniture in her home
- Oriental black jewelry box with costume jewelry
- Boot-shaped cigarette lighter
- Clock shaped like a pocket watch
- Handwritten letters to family and fans
- Wedding photo album and scrapbook
- Album covers
- Awards
- Sketches of costume designs personally drawn by Cline
- Jimmy Dean fan club card
- Gold lamé pants and shoes
- Costumes and memorabilia from Sweet Dreams, the movie about Cline's life
- Biopic hosted by Beverly D'Angelo, the actress nominated for a Golden Globe for her portrayal of Cline in Coal Miner's Daughter.

The exhibits in the museum are arranged in chronological order, with the last one featuring the costumes designed by Cline that she asked Nudie Cohn – a famous designer who created rhinestone-studded "Nudie suits" for many stars – to make for her. She sent her request along with measurements to Cohn on February 28, 1963. His reply agreeing to do the job arrived after she died less than a week later on March 5, 1963. Decades later, Cohn's granddaughter completed the costumes for the exhibit.

The museum closed on May 15, 2025.

== See also ==
- List of music museums
