= Jerry Lee Atwood =

Jerry Lee Atwood may refer to:

- Jerry Lee Atwood (clothing designer), American clothing designer
- Jerry L. Atwood, American chemist
