= Patsy Cline House =

Historic house in Virginia, United States

- Patsy Cline Historic House
- U.S. National Register of Historic Places
- Virginia Landmarks Register
- U.S. National Historic Landmark
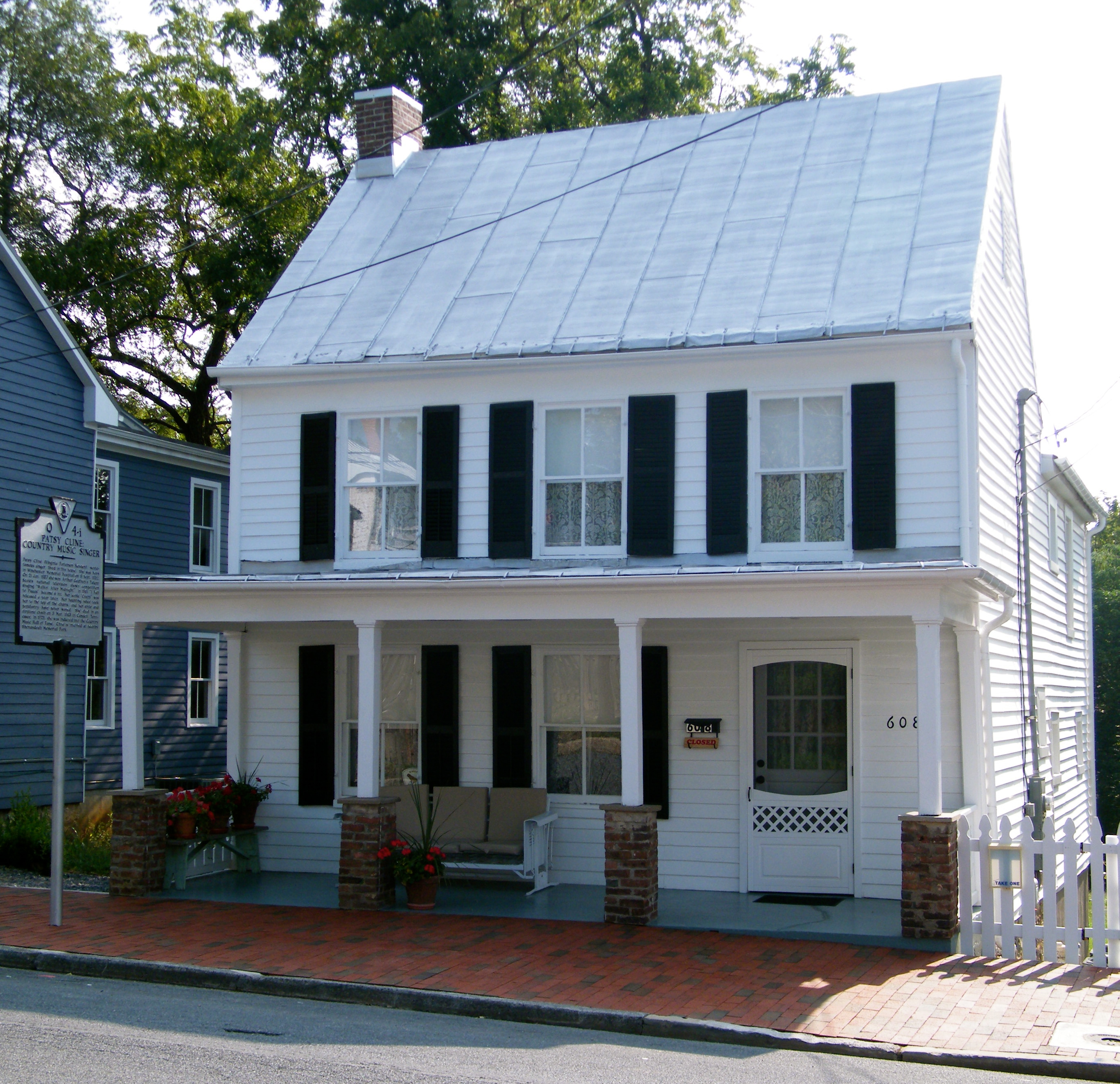

- Location within Virginia Location within the United States
- Location: 608 S. Kent St., Winchester, Virginia
- Coordinates: 39°10′41″N 78°9′53″W
- Area: 0.2 acres (0.081 ha)
- Architectural style: Greek Revival
- NRHP reference No.: 05001230
- VLR No.: 138-0042-0584
- NHL No.: 100006248

Significant dates
- Added to NRHP: November 8, 2005
- Designated VLR: September 14, 2005
- Designated NHL: January 13, 2021

The Patsy Cline Historic House at 608 S. Kent St., in a working-class neighborhood of Winchester, Virginia was the home from 1948 to 1953 of Virginia Patterson Hensley, who later became the country music star known as Patsy Cline. She moved out of the house when she got married at the age of 21 to Gerald Cline, but returned intermittently afterwards. The house was placed on both the Virginia Landmarks Register and the National Register of Historic Places in 2005, and a Virginia State Historical Marker was placed there about the same time. The house was designated a National Historic Landmark in 2021.

== History ==
Patsy's mother, Hilda Hensley, moved into the small house with her three children after separating from her husband and worked as a seamstress. At first she rented the house, but later bought it. In order to help support the family, Patsy left school at age 16 working as a waitress, soda jerk and in similar jobs and later began singing. She first sang on Joltin' Jim McCoy's Sunday morning show on radio station WINC in Winchester. Her mother sewed her first stage costumes in the house. Gospel singer Wally Fowler, who led the Oak Ridge Quartet, was impressed by her singing, and came to the house in an attempt to start Patsy's professional singing career.

The house is a simple two-story, three-bay building with a front porch and a tin roof and about 1,000 square feet (93 m^{2}) of space. The sole bedroom is on the second story and all four members of Patsy's family slept there. The house is a log cabin built in the mid-19th century. Almost all the logs are covered by walls, however, except for a small area covered by Plexiglas by the front door. Charlie Dick, who was Patsy's second husband and had lived in Winchester, remarked in the early 2000s that the house and the neighborhood had not changed since Patsy lived there. The house is now owned by a non-profit organization, Celebrating Patsy Cline, Inc., which spent about $100,000 to renovate it into a museum. The renovations included adding central heating and air conditioning. The museum opened in 2011.

Patsy Cline is buried a few miles south of the house in Shenandoah Memorial Park.
