= Patsy Cline =

American country singer (1932–1963)

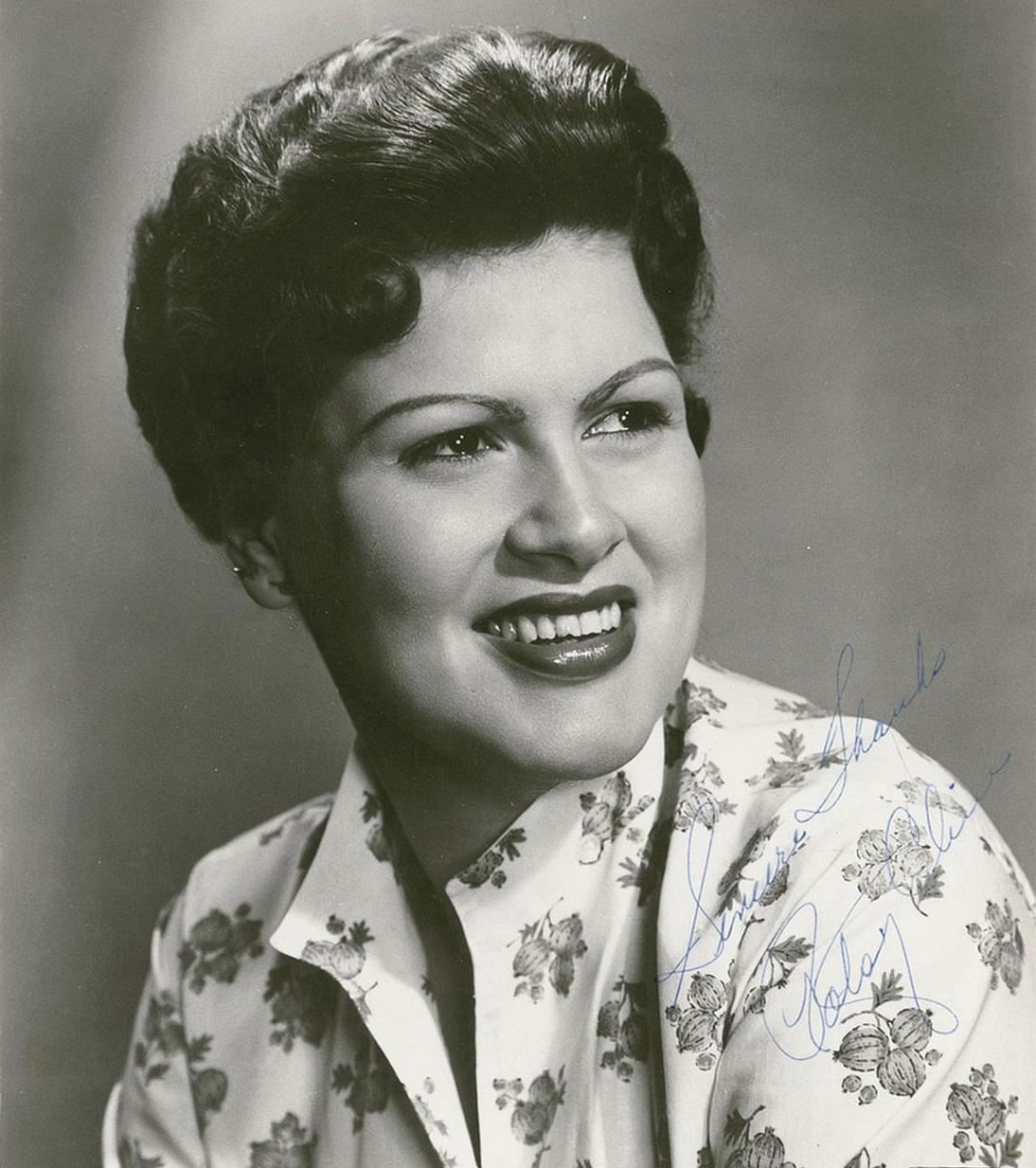
- Cline in 1960
- Born: Virginia Patterson Hensley; September 8, 1932; Winchester, Virginia, U.S.
- Died: March 5, 1963 (aged 30) near Camden, Tennessee, U.S.
- Cause of death: Plane crash
- Resting place: Shenandoah Memorial Park, Winchester, Virginia, U.S.
- Occupation: Singer
- Years active: 1948–1963
- Spouses: Gerald Cline (m. 1953; div. 1957); Charlie Dick (m. 1957)
- Children: 2
- Musical career
- Genres: Country; traditional pop
- Instrument: Vocals
- Works: Lifetime; posthumous; songs recorded
- Labels: 4 Star; Decca
- Website: patsymuseum.com

Patsy Cline (born Virginia Patterson Hensley; September 8, 1932 – March 5, 1963) was an American singer. One of the most influential vocalists of the 20th century, she was known as one of the first country music artists to successfully cross over into pop music. Cline had several major hits during her eight-year recording career, including two number-one hits on the Billboard Hot Country and Western Sides chart.

Born in Winchester, Virginia, Cline's first professional performances began in 1948 at local radio station WINC when she was 15. In the early 1950s, Cline began appearing in a local band led by performer Bill Peer. Various local appearances led to featured performances on Connie B. Gay's Town and Country television broadcasts. She signed her first recording contract with the 4 Star label in 1954, and had minor success with her earliest 4 Star singles, including "A Church, a Courtroom, Then Goodbye" (1955) and "I've Loved and Lost Again" (1956). In 1957, Cline made her first national television appearance on Arthur Godfrey's Talent Scouts. After performing "Walkin' After Midnight", the single became her first major hit on both the country and pop charts.

Cline's further singles with 4 Star Records were unsuccessful, although she continued performing and recording. In 1958, she relocated to Nashville, Tennessee, to further her career. Working with new manager Randy Hughes, Cline became a member of the Grand Ole Opry and then moved to Decca Records in 1960. Under the direction of producer Owen Bradley, her musical sound shifted, and she achieved consistent success. The 1961 single "I Fall to Pieces" became her first to top the Billboard country chart. Cline was severely injured in an automobile accident, which caused her to spend a month in the hospital. After she recovered, her next single, "Crazy", also became a major hit.

During her final years, Cline had hits with "She's Got You", "When I Get Through with You", "So Wrong", and "Leavin' on Your Mind". She also toured and headlined shows with more frequency. On March 5, 1963, she was killed in the 1963 Camden PA-24 crash along with country musicians Cowboy Copas and Hawkshaw Hawkins, and manager Randy Hughes, during a flight from Kansas City, Kansas, back to Nashville.

Since her death, Cline has been cited as one of the most celebrated, respected, and influential performers of the 20th century. Her music has influenced performers of various styles and genres. She has also been seen as a forerunner for women in country music, being among the first to sell records and headline concerts. In 1973, she became the first female performer to be inducted into the Country Music Hall of Fame. In the 1980s, Cline's posthumous successes continued in the mass media. She was portrayed twice in major motion pictures, including the 1985 biopic Sweet Dreams starring Jessica Lange. Several documentaries and stage shows about her have been made, including the 1988 musical Always...Patsy Cline. A 1991 box set of her recordings received critical acclaim. Her greatest-hits album sold over 10 million copies in 2005. In 2011, Cline's childhood home in Winchester was restored as a museum for visitors and fans to tour.

== Early life ==
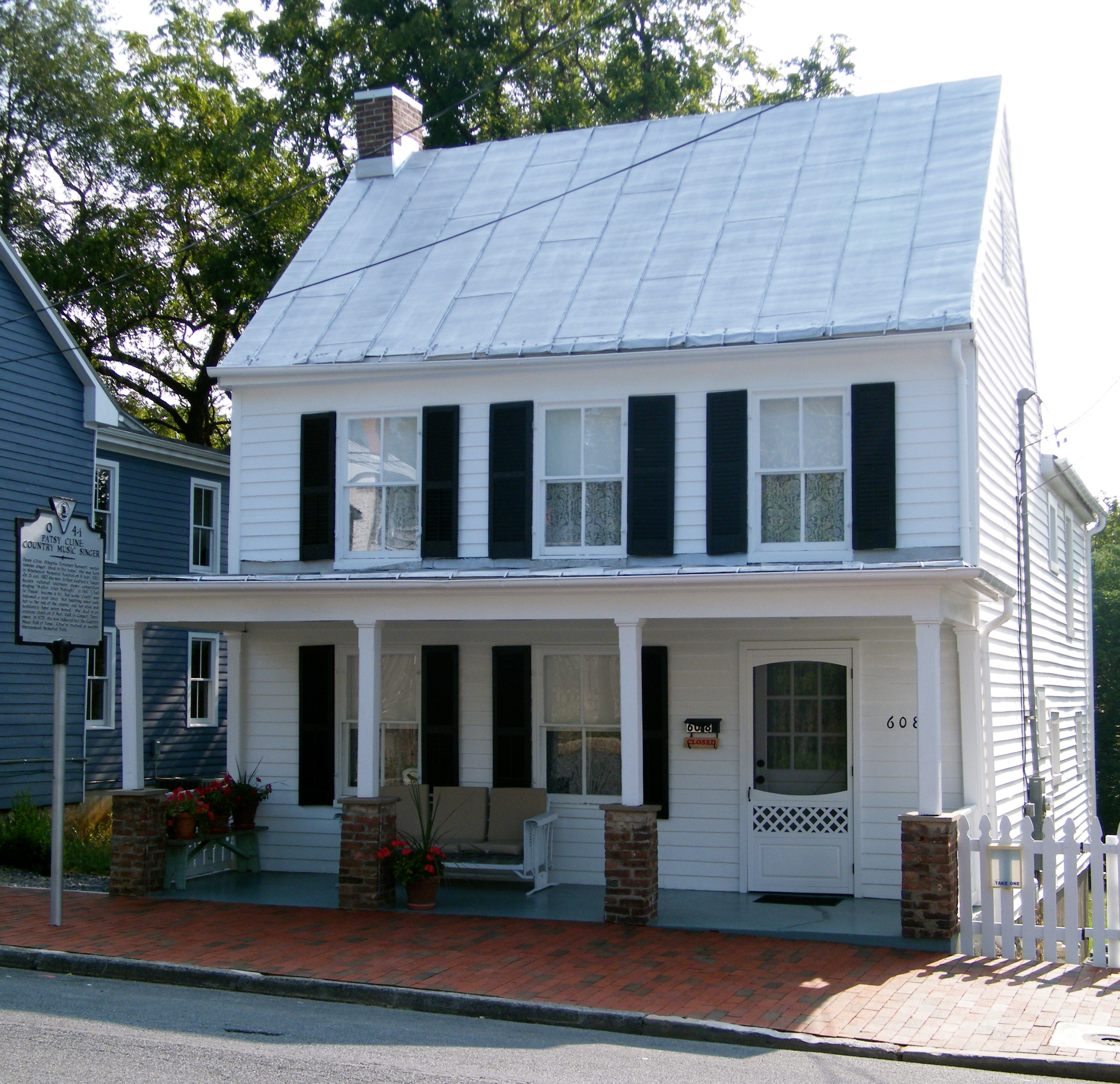
Cline's house on South Kent Street in Winchester, Virginia where she lived from age 16 to 21.

Virginia Patterson Hensley was born in Winchester, Virginia, on September 8, 1932, to Hilda Virginia (née Patterson) and Samuel Lawrence Hensley. Her mother was only 16 years old at the time of Cline's birth. Sam Hensley had been married before; Cline had two half siblings (aged 12 and 15), who lived with a foster family because of their mother's death years before. After Cline, Hilda Hensley gave birth to Samuel Jr. (called John) and Sylvia Mae. Besides being called "Virginia" in her childhood, Cline was referred to as "Ginny".

She temporarily lived with her mother's family in Gore, Virginia, before relocating many times throughout the state. In her childhood, the family relocated where Samuel Hensley, a blacksmith, could find employment, including Elkton, Staunton, and Norfolk. When the family had little money, she would find work, including at an Elkton poultry factory, where her job was to pluck and cut chickens. The family moved often before finally settling in Winchester, Virginia, on South Kent Street. Cline would later report that her father sexually abused her. When confiding the abuse to friend Loretta Lynn, Cline told her, "take this to your grave." Hilda Hensley would later report details of the abuse to producers of Cline's 1985 biopic Sweet Dreams.

At age 13, Cline was hospitalized with a throat infection and rheumatic fever. Speaking of the incident in 1957, she said, "I developed a terrible throat infection and my heart even stopped beating. The doctor put me in an oxygen tent. You might say it was my return to the living after several days that launched me as a singer. The fever affected my throat and when I recovered, I had this booming voice like Kate Smith's." During this time, she developed an interest in singing. She started performing with her mother in the local Baptist choir. Mother and daughter also performed duets at church social events. She also taught herself how to play the piano.

With the new performing opportunities, Cline's interest in singing grew, and at the age of 14, she told her mother that she was going to audition for the local radio station. Her first radio performances were at WINC in the Winchester area. According to WINC's radio disc jockey Joltin' Jim McCoy, Cline appeared in the station's waiting room one day and asked to audition. McCoy was impressed by her audition performance, reportedly saying, "Well, if you've got nerve enough to stand before that mic[rophone] and sing over the air live, I've got nerve enough to let you." While performing on the radio, Cline also started appearing in talent contests and created a nightclub cabaret act similar to performer Helen Morgan's.

Cline's parents had marital conflicts during her childhood, and by 1947, her father had deserted the family. Author Ellis Nassour of the biography Honky Tonk Angel: An Intimate Story of Patsy Cline reported Cline had a "beautiful relationship" with her mother. In his interviews with Hilda Hensley, he quoted Cline's mother as saying they "were more like sisters" than parent and child. Cline attended the ninth grade at John Handley High School in Winchester. However, the family had trouble sustaining an income after her father's desertion, and Cline dropped out of high school to help support the family. She began working at Gaunt's Drug Store in the Winchester area as a clerk and soda jerk.

== Career ==
=== 1948–1953: Early career ===
At age 15, Cline wrote a letter to the Grand Ole Opry asking for an audition. She told local photographer Ralph Grubbs about the letter, "A friend thinks I'm crazy to send it. What do you think?" Grubbs encouraged Cline to send it. Several weeks later, she received a return letter from the Opry asking for pictures and recordings. At the same time, Gospel performer Wally Fowler headlined a concert in her hometown. Cline convinced concert employees to let her backstage, where she asked Fowler for an audition. Following a successful audition, Cline's family received a call asking for her to audition for the Opry. She traveled with her mother, two siblings, and a family friend on an eight-hour journey to Nashville, Tennessee. With limited finances, they drove overnight and slept in a Nashville park the following morning. Cline auditioned for Opry performer Moon Mullican the same day. The audition was well-received, and Cline expected to hear from the Opry the same day. However, she never received news and the family returned to Virginia.

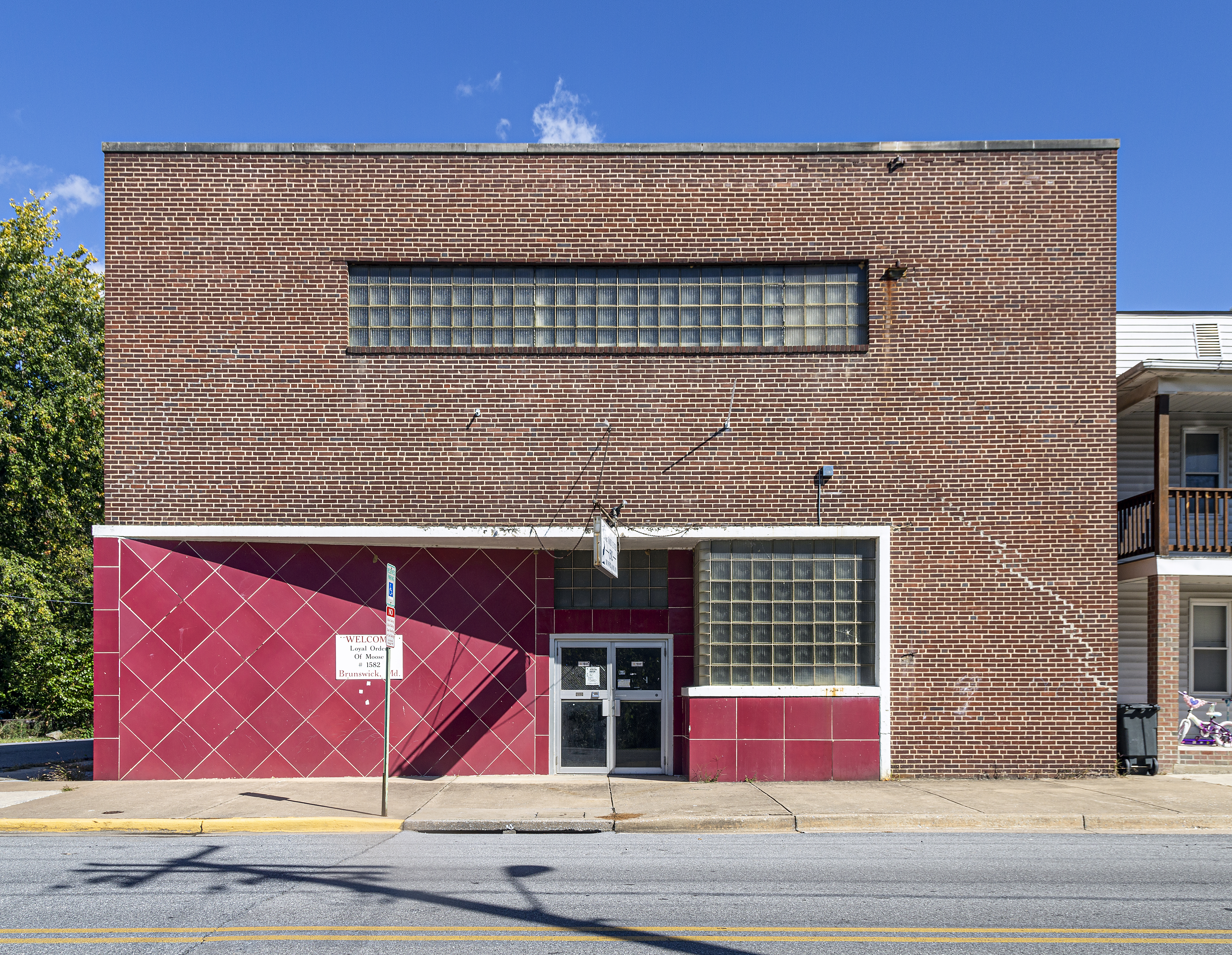
The Brunswick, Maryland Moose Lodge

By the early 1950s, Cline continued performing around the local area. In 1952, she asked to audition for local country bandleader Bill Peer. Following her audition, she began performing regularly as a member of Bill Peer's Melody Boys and Girls. The pair's relationship turned romantic, continuing an affair for several years. Nonetheless, the pair remained married to their spouses. Peer's group played primarily at the Moose Lodge in Brunswick, Maryland, where she would meet her first husband, Gerald Cline. Peer encouraged her to have a more appropriate stage name. She changed her first name from Virginia to Patsy (taken from her middle name, Patterson). She kept her new last name, Cline. Ultimately, she became professionally known as "Patsy Cline".

In August 1953, Cline was a contestant in a local country music contest. She won $100 and the opportunity to perform as a regular on Connie B. Gay's Town and Country Time. The show included country stars Jimmy Dean, Roy Clark, George Hamilton IV, and Billy Grammer, and was filmed in Washington, DC and Arlington County, Virginia. She was not officially added to the program's television shows until October 1955. Cline's television performances received critical acclaim. The Washington Star magazine praised her stage presence, commenting, "She creates the moods through movement of her hands and body and by the lilt of her voice, reaching way down deep in her soul to bring forth the melody. Most female country music vocalists stand motionless, sing with monotonous high-pitched nasal twang. Patsy's come up with a throaty style loaded with motion and E-motion."

=== 1954–1960: 4 Star Records ===
In 1954, Bill Peer created and distributed a series of demonstration tapes with Cline's voice on it. A tape was brought to the attention of Bill McCall, president of 4 Star Records. On September 30, 1954, she signed a two-year recording contract with the label alongside Peer and her husband Gerald Cline. The original contract gave the vast majority of the revenue from her recordings to 4 Star, with Cline receiving less than three percent in royalties. Her first recording session took place in Nashville on January 5, 1955. Songs for the session were handpicked by McCall and Paul Cohen. 4 Star leased the recordings to the larger Decca Records. For those reasons, Owen Bradley was chosen as the session's producer, a professional relationship that continued into the 1960s. Her first single release was 1955's "A Church, a Courtroom, Then Goodbye". Although Cline promoted it with an appearance on the Grand Ole Opry, the song was not successful.

Cline recorded a variety of musical styles while recording for 4 Star. This included genres such as gospel, rockabilly, traditional country, and pop. Writers and music journalists have had mixed responses on Cline's 4 Star material. Robert Oermann and Mary Bufwack of Finding Her Voice: Women in Country Music called the label's choice of material "mediocre". They also commented that Cline seemed to have "groped for her own sound on the label". Kurt Wolff of Country Music the Rough Guide commented that the music was "sturdy enough, but they only hinted at the potential that lurked inside her. Richie Unterberger of Allmusic claimed it was Cline's voice that made the 4 Star material less appealing: "Circumstances were not wholly to blame for Cline's commercial failures. She would have never made it as a rockabilly singer, lacking the conviction of Wanda Jackson or the spunk of Brenda Lee. In fact, in comparison with her best work, she sounds rather stiff and ill-at-ease on most of her early singles."

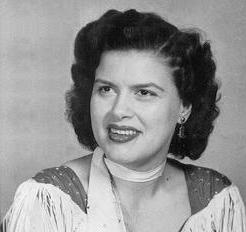
Publicity photograph, March 1957

Between 1955 and 1956, Cline's four singles for 4 Star failed to become hits, but she continued performing regionally, including on the Town and Country Jamboree. In 1956, she appeared on ABC's country music program, Ozark Jubilee. It was at one of her local performances that she met her second husband, Charlie Dick. In 1956, Cline received a call to perform on Arthur Godfrey's Talent Scouts, a national television show for which she had auditioned several months prior. She accepted the offer, using her mother Hilda Hensley as her talent scout for the show. According to the show's rules, talent scouts could not be family members. For those reasons, Cline's mother lied to appear on the show. When Arthur Godfrey asked if Hensley had known Cline her entire life, she replied, "Yes, just about!"

Cline and Hensley flew into New York City's LaGuardia Airport on January 18, 1957. She made her debut appearance on the program on January 21. The day of the show, she met with the show's producer, Janette Davis. Cline had chosen "A Poor Man's Roses (Or a Rich Man's Gold)" to perform on the program, but Davis preferred another song she had recorded, "Walkin' After Midnight". Cline initially refused to perform it, but ultimately agreed to it. Davis also suggested Cline wear a cocktail dress instead of the cowgirl outfit created by her mother. She performed "Walkin' After Midnight" and won the program's contest that night. The song had not yet been released as a single. To keep up with public demand, Decca Records rush-released the song as a single on February 11. The song ultimately became Cline's breakthrough hit, peaking at number two on the Billboard Hot Country and Western Sides chart. The song also reached number 12 on the Billboard pop music chart. The song has since been considered a classic in country music since its release.

Music critics and writers have positively praised "Walkin' After Midnight". Mary Bufwack and Robert Oermann called the song "bluesy". Richie Unterberger noted "it's well-suited for the almost bemused aura of loneliness of the lyric." The success of "Walkin' After Midnight" brought Cline numerous appearances on shows and major networks. She continued working for Arthur Godfrey over the next several months. She also appeared on the Grand Ole Opry in February and the television program Western Ranch Party in March. The money she had earned from her numerous engagements totaled $10,000. Cline gave all the money to her mother, which she used to the pay the mortgage on her Winchester house. In August 1957, her debut studio album was released on Decca Records.

Cline's follow-up singles to "Walkin' After Midnight" did not yield any success. This was partially due to the quality of material chosen for her to record. Cline was dissatisfied with the limited success following "Walkin' After Midnight". Bradley recounted how she often came to him, saying, "Hoss, can't you do something? I feel like a prisoner." Around the same time, Cline was fired from her regular slot on Town and Country Jamboree. According to Connie B. Gay, she ran late for shows and "showed up with liquor on her breath." In September 1957, Cline married Charlie Dick, and he was soon sent to Fort Bragg, North Carolina, on a military assignment. Cline also gave birth to her first daughter Julie. In hopes of restarting her career, Cline and her family moved to Nashville, Tennessee.

=== 1960–1961: New beginnings and car accident ===
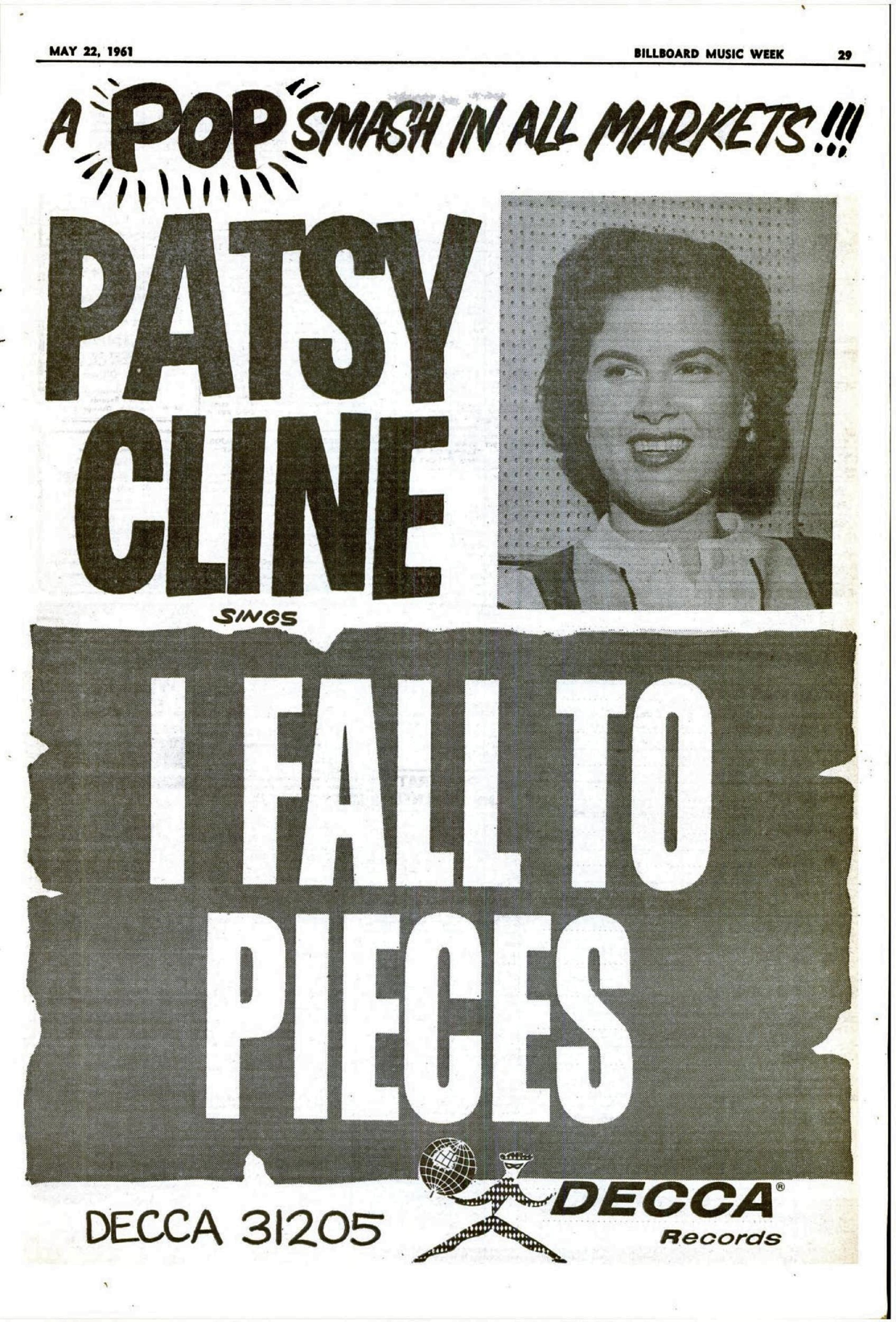
Billboard advertisement, May 22, 1961

Cline's professional decisions yielded more positive results by the early 1960s. Upon moving to Nashville, she signed a management deal with Randy Hughes. She originally wished to work with Hubert Long, but he was busy managing other artists. Instead, she turned her attention to Hughes. With the help of Hughes, she began working steadier jobs. He organized $50 bookings and got her multiple performances on the Grand Ole Opry. In January 1960, Cline officially became a member of the Opry. When she asked general manager Ott Devine about a membership, he replied, "Patsy, if that's all you want, you're on the Opry." Also in January 1960, Cline made her final recording sessions set forth in her contract with 4 Star Records. Later that year, her final singles with the label were released: "Lovesick Blues" and "Crazy Dreams". Leaving 4 Star, Cline officially signed with Decca Records in late 1960, working exclusively under Bradley's direction. Insisting on receiving an advance, she received $1,000 ($11,281 in 2026) from Bradley once she began at the label.

Her first release on Decca was 1961's "I Fall to Pieces". The song was written by newly established Nashville songwriters Hank Cochran and Harlan Howard. "I Fall to Pieces" had first been turned down by Roy Drusky and Brenda Lee before Cline cut it in November 1960. At the recording session, she worried about the song's production, particularly the background vocals performed by The Jordanaires. After much arguing between both Cline and Bradley, they negotiated that she would record "I Fall to Pieces" (a song Bradley favored) and "Lovin' in Vain" (a song she favored). Released as a single in January 1961, "I Fall to Pieces" attracted little attention upon its initial issue. In April, the song debuted on the Hot Country and Western Sides chart. By August 7, the song became her first to top the country chart. Additionally, "I Fall to Pieces" crossed over onto the Billboard pop chart, peaking at number 12. Billboard ranked it as the number-two song for 1961 in the end-of-year charts.

Cline promotional photograph shortly before her 1961 car accident

On June 14, 1961, Cline and her brother Sam Hensley Jr. were involved in an automobile accident. Cline had brought her mother, sister, and brother to see her new Nashville home the day before. On the day of the accident, Cline and her brother went shopping to buy material for her mother to make clothing. Upon driving home, their car was struck head-on by another vehicle. The impact threw her directly into the car windshield, causing extensive facial and other injuries. Among them, Cline suffered a broken wrist, dislocated hip, and a large cut across her forehead, barely missing her eyes. Friend Dottie West heard about the accident on the radio and rushed to the scene, helping to remove pieces of broken glass from Cline's hair. When first responders arrived, Cline insisted the driver in the other vehicle be treated first. Two of the three passengers riding in the car that struck Cline died after arriving at the hospital. When she was brought to the hospital, her injuries were life-threatening, and she was not expected to live. She underwent surgery and survived. According to her husband Charlie Dick, upon waking up, she said to him, "Jesus was here, Charlie. Don't worry. He took my hand and told me, 'No, not now. I have other things for you to do.'" She spent a month recovering in the hospital.

=== 1961–1963: Career peak and final years ===
Cline returned to her career six weeks after her 1961 car accident. Her first public appearance was on the Grand Ole Opry, where she assured fans she would continue performing. She said to the audience that night, "You're wonderful. I'll tell you one thing: the greatest gift, I think, that you folks coulda given me was the encouragement that you gave me. Right at the very time I needed you the most, you came through with the flying-est colors. And I just want to say you'll just never know how happy you made this ol' country gal."

Cline's follow-up single to "I Fall to Pieces" was the song "Crazy". It was written by Willie Nelson, whose version of the song was first heard by Dick. When Dick brought the song to Cline, she did not like it. When Dick encouraged her to record "Crazy", Cline replied, "I don't care what you say. I don't like it and I ain't gonna record it. And that's that." Bradley liked the song and set the date for its recording for August 17. When Cline got to Bradley's studio, he convinced her to record it. She listened to Nelson's version of "Crazy" and decided she was going to perform it differently. Nelson's version included a spoken section that Cline removed. She cut additional material on August 17, and when she got to "Crazy", it became difficult to perform. Because Cline was still recovering from the accident, performing the song's high notes caused rib pain. Giving her time to rest, Bradley sent her home, while musicians laid down the track without her. A week later, she returned and recorded her vocal in a single take.

"Crazy" was released as a single in October 1961, debuting on the Billboard country charts in November. It peaked at number 2 there and number 9 on the same publication's pop charts. "Crazy" also became Cline's biggest pop hit. Her second studio album, Patsy Cline Showcase, was released in late 1961. The album featured both major hits from that year and re-recorded versions of "Walkin' After Midnight" and "A Poor Man's Roses (Or a Rich Man's Gold)".

"Crazy" has since been called a country music standard. Cline's vocal performance and the song's production have received high praise over time. Cub Koda of AllMusic noted the "ache" in her voice that makes the song stand out: "Cline's reading of the lyric is filled with an aching world weariness that transforms the tune into one of the first big crossover hits without even trying hard." Country music historian Paul Kingsbury also highlighted her "ache," saying in 2007: "Cline's hit recording swings with such velvety finesse, and her voice throbs and aches so exquisitely, that the entire production sounds absolutely effortless." Jhoni Jackson of Paste Magazine called the recording "iconic", highlighting the emotional "pain" Cline expressed in her voice.

"Crazy" and Cline's additional Decca recordings have received critical praise. Mary Bufwack and Robert Oermann noted: "Her thrilling voice invariably invested these with new depth. Patsy's dramatic volume control, stretched-note effects, sobs, pauses, and unique ways of holding back, then bursting into full-throated phrases also breathed new life into country chestnuts like "San Antonio Rose", "Blue Moon of Kentucky", and "Half as Much". Richie Unterberger of AllMusic commented that her voice "sounded richer, more confident, and more mature, with ageless wise and vulnerable qualities that have enabled her records to maintain their appeal with subsequent generations." Kurt Wolff of Country Music the Rough Guide reported that Owen Bradley recognized potential in Cline's voice, and once he gained studio control, he smoothed arrangements and "refined her voice into an instrument of torch-singing glory."

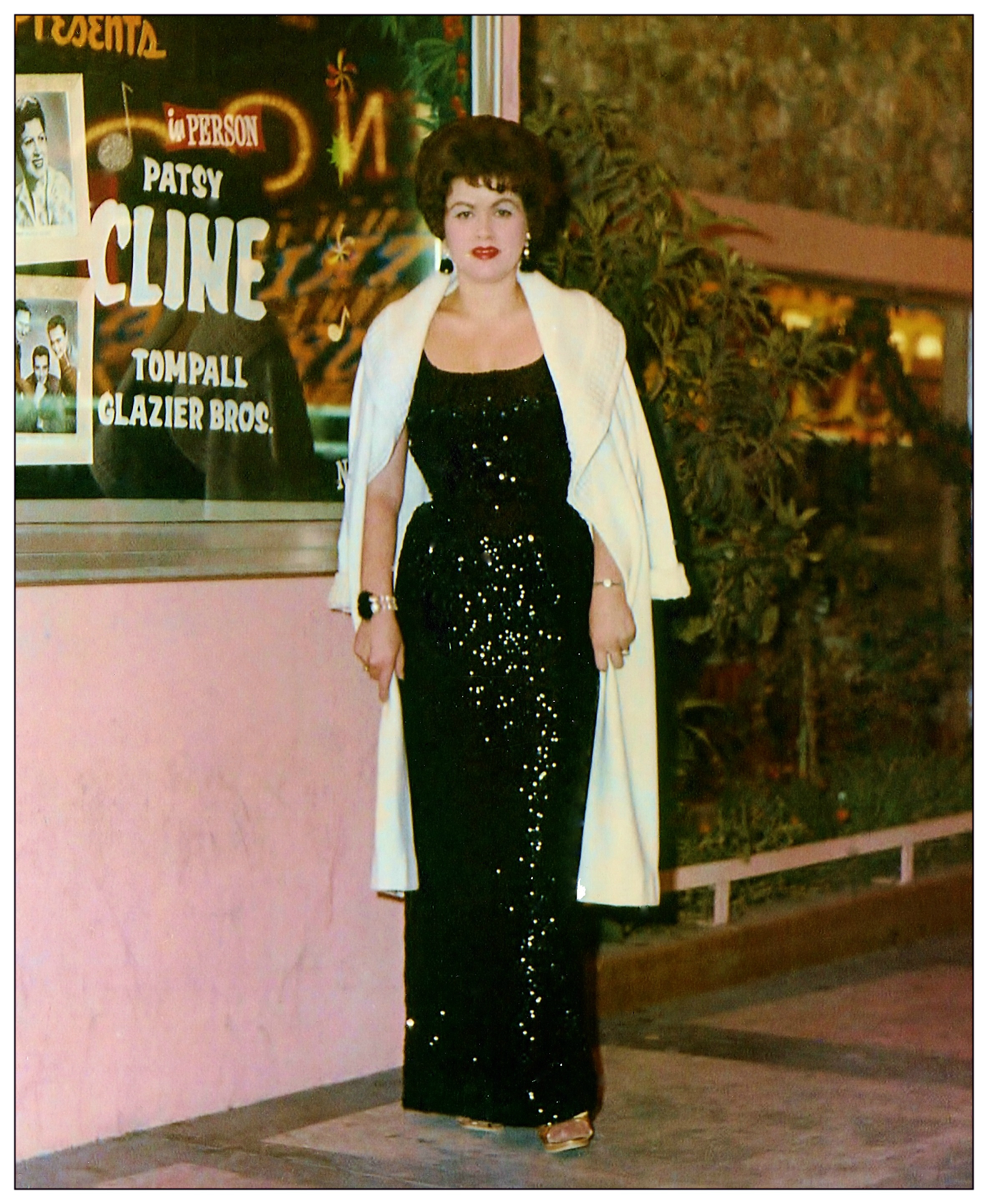
Patsy Cline in front of the Merri-Mint Theatre in Las Vegas, Nevada, late 1962

In November 1961, she was invited to perform as part of the Grand Ole Opry's show at Carnegie Hall in New York City. She was joined by Opry stars Minnie Pearl, Grandpa Jones, Jim Reeves, Bill Monroe, Marty Robbins, and Faron Young. Despite positive reviews, New York Journal-American columnist Dorothy Kilgallen commented, "everybody should get out of town because the hillbillies are coming!" The comment upset Cline, but did not affect ticket sales; the Opry performance sold out. By the end of year, Cline had won several major industry awards, including "Favorite Female Vocalist" from Billboard and Cashbox's "Most Programmed Female Artist".

Also in 1961, Cline was back in the studio to record an upcoming album. Among the first songs she recorded was "She's Got You". Written by Hank Cochran, he pitched the song to Cline over the phone. Insisting that Patsy hear it in person, Cochran brought the recording over to her house, along with a bottle of alcohol. Upon listening to it again, she liked the song and wanted to record it. Owen Bradley also liked the song, and she recorded it on December 17, 1961. "She's Got You" became her third country-pop crossover hit by early 1962. "She's Got You" would also be her second number-one hit on the Billboard country chart. It was also Cline's first entry in the United Kingdom singles chart, reaching number 43. The cover by Alma Cogan, one of Britain's most popular female artists of the 1950s, performed notably, as well.

In 1962, Cline had three major hits with "When I Get Through with You, "So Wrong", and "Imagine That". Cline's career successes helped her become financially stable enough to purchase her first home. She bought a ranch house located in Goodlettsville, Tennessee, a suburb of Nashville. The home was decorated by Cline and included a music room, several bedrooms, and a large backyard. According to Dottie West: "The house was her mansion, the sign she'd arrived." Cline called it her "dream home" and often had friends over to visit. After her death, the house was sold to country artist Wilma Burgess.

In the summer of 1962, manager Randy Hughes got her a role in a country music vehicle film. It also starred Dottie West, Webb Pierce, and Sonny James. After arriving to film in DeLand, Florida, the producer "ran off with the money," according to West. The movie was never made. In August, her third studio album, Sentimentally Yours, was released. It featured "She's Got You", as well as several country and pop standards. According to biographer Ellis Nassour, her royalties "were coming in slim" and she needed "financial security." Therefore, Randy Hughes arranged Cline to work at the Merri-Mint Theatre in Las Vegas, Nevada for 35 days. Cline would later dislike the experience. During the engagement, she developed a dry throat. She also was homesick and wanted to spend time with her children. By appearing at the engagement, Cline became the first female country artist to headline her own show in Las Vegas.

During this period, Cline was said to have experienced premonitions of her own death. Dottie West, June Carter Cash, and Loretta Lynn recalled Cline telling them she felt a sense of impending doom and did not expect to live much longer. In letters, she would also describe the happiness of her new career successes. In January 1963, her next single, "Leavin' on Your Mind", was released and debuted on the Billboard country chart soon after. In February, she recorded her final sessions for Decca Records. Among the songs recorded were "Sweet Dreams", "He Called Me Baby", and "Faded Love". Cline arranged for friends Jan Howard and Dottie West to come and hear the session playbacks. According to Howard, "I was in awe of Patsy. You know, afterward you're supposed to say something nice. I couldn't talk. I was dumbfounded."

== Personal life ==
=== Friendships ===
"At one time or another, she must have helped all of us girl singers who were starting out...Patsy was always giving her friends things [like] the scrapbook of clippings and mementos Patsy gave me weeks before she was killed...when I got home I was leafing through it, and there was a check for $75 with a note saying, 'I know you have been having a hard time'...there'll never be another like Patsy Cline."

— Dottie West on her friendship with Cline

Cline had close friendships with several country artists and performers. Her friendship with Loretta Lynn has been the subject of numerous books, songs, films, and other projects. The pair first met when Lynn performed "I Fall to Pieces" on the radio shortly after Cline's 1961 car accident. Cline heard the broadcast and sent her husband to pick up Lynn so they could meet. According to Lynn, the pair became close friends "right away." Lynn later described their friendship in detail, "She taught me a lot about show business, like how to go on a stage and how to get off. She even bought me a lot of clothes... She even bought me curtains and drapes for my house because I was too broke to buy them... She was a great human being and a great friend." Lynn also noted they became so close that Cline even gave her underwear.

Dottie West was another female country artist with whom Cline became friends. They first met backstage at the Grand Ole Opry. West wrote Cline a fan letter after hearing her first hit, "Walkin' After Midnight". According to West, Cline "showed a genuine interest in her career" and they became close friends. The pair often spent time at their homes and worked on packaged tour dates together. West also stated Cline was a supportive friend who helped out in times of need.

Jan Howard was a third female artist with whom Cline had a close friendship. The pair first met when Cline tried starting an argument with Howard backstage at the Grand Ole Opry. She said to Howard, "You're a conceited little son of a bitch! You just go out there, do your spot, and leave without saying hello to anyone." Howard was upset and replied angrily back. Cline then laughed and said, "Slow down! Hoss, you're all right. Anybody that'll stand there and talk back to the Cline like that is all right...I can tell we're gonna be good friends!" The pair remained close for the remainder of Cline's life. Other friendships Cline had with female artists included Brenda Lee, Barbara Mandrell and pianist Del Wood. She also became friends with male country artists, including Roger Miller, who helped Cline find material to record. Faron Young was another male artist whom Cline befriended from working on tour together. While on tour, the pair would spend time together, including a trip to Hawaii, where the pair saw a hula show.

=== Family ===
Cline's mother Hilda Hensley continued living in Winchester, Virginia, following her daughter's death. She rented out the family's childhood home on South Kent Street and lived across the street. Following Cline's death, Hensley briefly spent time raising her two grandchildren in Virginia. Hensley maintained a closet full of her daughter's stage costumes, including a sequined dress Cline wore while performing in Las Vegas in 1962. She worked as a seamstress and made many of her daughter's stage costumes.

Cline's father Samuel Hensley died of lung cancer in 1956. Hensley had deserted the family in 1947. Shortly before his death, upon learning that he was gravely ill, Cline said to her mother, "Mama, I know what-all he did, but it seems he's real sick and may not make it. In spite of everything, I want to visit him." Cline and her mother visited him at a hospital in Martinsburg, West Virginia.

Cline had two surviving children at the time of her own death: Julie Simadore and Allen Randolph "Randy" Dick. Julie has been a significant factor in keeping her mother's legacy alive. She has appeared at numerous public appearances in support of her mother's music and career. Following the death of Julie's father in 2015, she helped open a museum dedicated to Cline in Nashville. Julie has few memories of her mother due her young age at the time of Cline's death. In an interview with People, Julie discussed her mother's legacy: "I do understand her position in history, and the history of Nashville and country music...I'm still kind of amazed at it myself, because there's 'Mom' and then there's 'Patsy Cline,' and I'm actually a fan."

Cline's mother died in 1998, 35 years after Cline's death. Both of Cline's surviving siblings fought in court over their mother's estate. Because of legal fees, many of Cline's possessions were sold at auction.

American female blues, swing, and rock and roll singer, songwriter, and record producer Casey Hensley is a distant relation of Cline's.

=== Marriages ===
Cline was married twice. Her first marriage was to Gerald Cline, on March 7, 1953. His family had owned a contracting and excavating company in Frederick, Maryland. According to Cline's brother Sam, he liked "flashy cars and women." The two met while she was performing with Bill Peer at the Moose Lodge in Brunswick, Maryland. Gerald Cline said, "It might not have been love at first sight when Patsy saw me, but it was for me." Gerald Cline often took her to "one-nighters" and other concerts in which she performed. Although he enjoyed her performances, he could not get used to her touring and road schedule. During their marriage, Patsy told a friend that she did not think she "knew what love was" upon marrying Gerald. The pair began living separately by the end of 1956 and divorced in 1957.

Cline married her second husband, Charlie Dick, on September 15, 1957. The pair met in 1956 while Cline was performing with a local Virginia band. At the time, Dick was a linotype operator for a local newspaper, The Winchester Star. According to Dick, he had asked Cline to dance, and she replied, "I can't dance while I'm working, okay?" They eventually started spending time together, and Cline told close friends about their relationship. Cline told Grand Ole Opry pianist Del Wood in 1956: "Hoss, I got some news. I met a boy my own age who's a hurricane in pants! Del, I'm in love, and it's for real this time." The pair had children Julie and Randy together. Their relationship was considered both romantic and tempestuous. According to Robert Oermann and Mary Bufwack, Cline and Dick's marriage was "fueled by alcohol, argument, passion, jealousy, success, tears, and laughter."

According to biographer Ellis Nassour, the pair fought often, but remained together. They had gained a reputation as "heavy drinkers", but according to Dick himself, they were not "drunks". During one particular fight, Cline had Dick arrested after they became physical with one another. Following Cline's death in 1963, Dick married country artist Jamey Ryan in 1965. The pair divorced in the early 1970s after having one child together. Dick helped keep Cline's legacy alive for the remainder of his life. He assisted in producing several documentaries about Cline's career, including Remembering Patsy and The Real Patsy Cline. He became involved with Hallway Productions in the 1990s and helped produce videos on other artists, including Willie Nelson and The Mamas and the Papas. Dick died in 2015 and was laid to rest next to Cline.

== Death ==
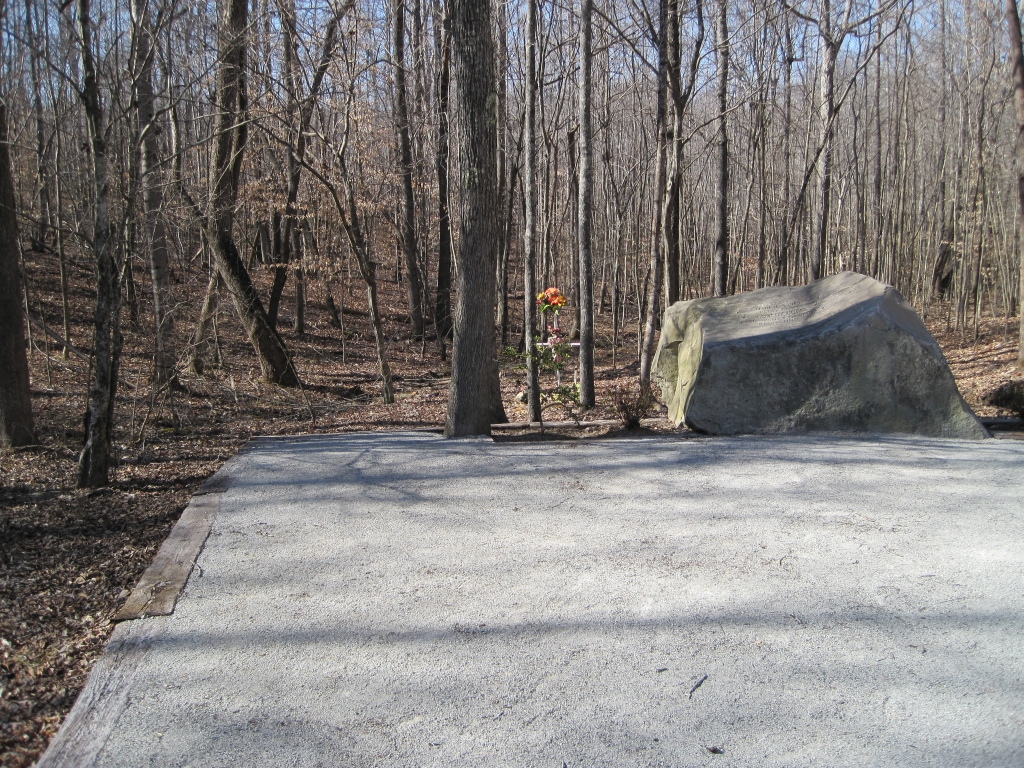
Patsy Cline aircraft crash site, Camden, Tennessee

On March 3, 1963, Cline performed a benefit at the Soldiers and Sailors Memorial Hall, Kansas City, Kansas, for the family of disc jockey "Cactus" Jack Call. He had died in an automobile crash a little over a month earlier. Also performing in the show were George Jones, George Riddle and The Jones Boys, Billy Walker, Dottie West, Wilma Lee and Stoney Cooper, George McCormick, the Clinch Mountain Boys, Cowboy Copas, and Hawkshaw Hawkins. Despite having a cold, Cline performed at 2:00, 5:15, and 8:15 p.m. The shows were standing-room only. For the 2:00 p.m. show, she wore a sky-blue tulle-laden dress; for the 5:15 show, a red dress; and for the closing show at 8:00, Cline wore white chiffon. Her final song was the last she had recorded the previous month, "I'll Sail My Ship Alone".

Cline spent the night at the Town House Motor Hotel, and was unable to fly out the day after the concert because Fairfax Airport was fogged in. Dottie West asked Patsy to ride with her and her husband, Bill, who were making the eight-hour drive from Kansas City back to Nashville. But Cline refused, saying: "Don't worry about me, Hoss. When it's my time to go, it's my time." On March 5, she called her mother from the motel and checked out at 12:30 p.m., going the short distance to the airport and boarding a Piper PA-24 Comanche plane, aircraft registration number N7000P. On board were Cline, Copas, Hawkins, and pilot Randy Hughes.

The plane stopped once in Rogers, Arkansas, to refuel and subsequently landed at Dyersburg Municipal Airport in Dyersburg, Tennessee, at 5 pm. Hawkins had accepted Billy Walker's place after Walker left on a commercial flight to take care of a stricken family member. The Dyersburg, Tennessee, airfield manager suggested they stay the night because of high winds and inclement weather, offering them free rooms and meals. Hughes, who was not trained in instrument flying, said: "I've already come this far. We'll be there before you know it." The plane took off at 6:07 p.m.

Cline's flight crashed in heavy weather on the evening of March 5, 1963. The plane was found some 90 miles (140 km) from its Nashville destination, in a forest outside of Camden, Tennessee. Forensic examination concluded that everyone aboard had been killed instantly. Until the wreckage was discovered the following dawn and reported on the radio, friends and family had not given up hope. Endless calls tied up the local telephone exchanges to such a degree that other emergency calls had trouble getting through. The lights at the aircraft's destination, Cornelia Fort Airpark, were kept on throughout the night, as reports of the missing plane were broadcast on radio and TV.

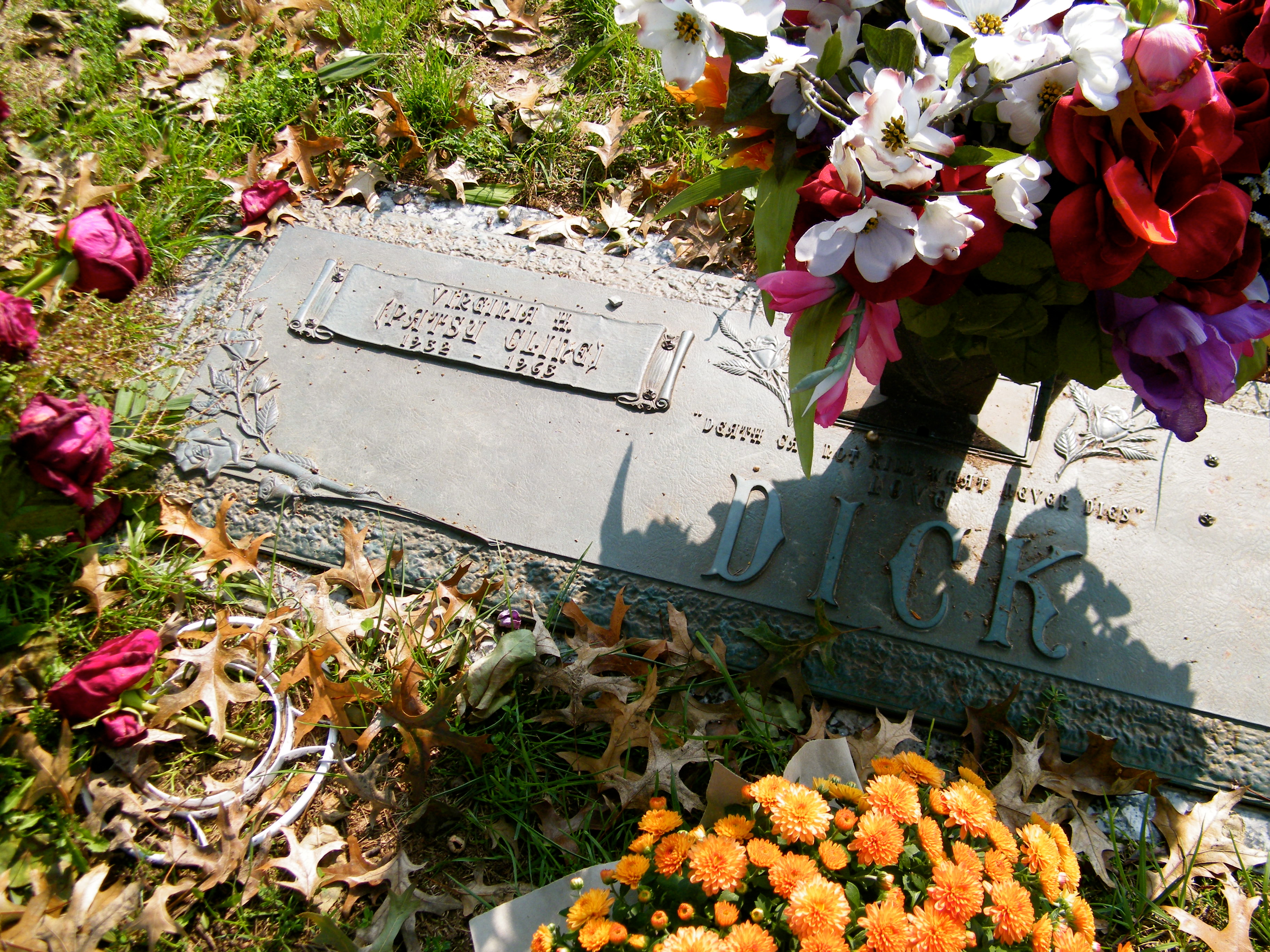
The grave of Patsy Cline

Early in the morning, Roger Miller and a friend went searching for survivors: "As fast as I could, I ran through the woods screaming their names—through the brush and the trees—and I came up over this little rise, oh, my God, there they were. It was ghastly. The plane had crashed nose down." Shortly after the bodies were removed, looters scavenged the area. Some recovered items were eventually donated to the Country Music Hall of Fame. Cline's wristwatch, a Confederate flag cigarette lighter, a studded belt, and three pairs of gold lamé slippers were among them. Cline's payment in cash from the last performance was never recovered. In accordance with her wishes, Cline's body was brought home first for her memorial service, which thousands attended. People jammed against the small tent over her gold casket and the grave to take all the flowers they could reach as keepsakes. She was buried at Shenandoah Memorial Park in her hometown of Winchester, Virginia. Her grave is marked with a bronze plaque, which reads: "Virginia H. Dick ('Patsy Cline' is noted under her name) 'Death Cannot Kill What Never Dies: Love'." A memorial marks the exact place off Mt. Carmel Road in Camden, Tennessee, where the plane crashed.

== Posthumous releases ==
=== Music ===
Since Cline's death, Decca Records (later MCA) has re-released much of her music. The Patsy Cline Story was the first compilation album the label released following her death. It included the songs "Sweet Dreams (Of You)" and "Faded Love". Both tracks were released as singles in 1963. "Sweet Dreams" would reach number 5 on the Billboard country charts and 44 on the Hot 100. "Faded Love" would also become a Top 10 hit on the Billboard country chart, peaking at number seven in October 1963. In 1967, Decca released the compilation Patsy Cline's Greatest Hits. The album peaked at number 17 on the Billboard country chart, and was certified diamond in sales from the Recording Industry Association of America. In 2005, the Guinness World Book of Records cited Cline's Greatest Hits album as being the longest charting album of any female vocalist of any genre of music. In 1980, Cline's version of "Always" with new music tracks made the Billboard country chart, peaking at number 18. An album of the same name was also released in 1980 that peaked within the Top 30 on the Billboard Top Country Albums chart. Cline and Jim Reeves had never sung together, but had recorded several of the same songs. Their separate vocal tracks were dubbed together on two selections. These became radio hits during the early 1980s. Following the release of the Loretta Lynn biopic Coal Miner's Daughter (1980), interest in Cline's career renewed. As a result, MCA Records reissued many of Cline's earlier studio and compilation releases. Her 1967 greatest-hits album was repackaged in 1988 and labeled 12 Greatest Hits. The record reached number 27 on the Top Country Albums list in 1990. The soundtrack for the controversial Sweet Dreams film was released in 1985. It peaked at number six on the Billboard country albums chart.

In 1991, MCA records issued her first boxed set, titled The Patsy Cline Collection. The album chronicled all of Cline's recorded material for 4 Star and Decca Records. The boxed set received positive reviews, notably by Thom Jurek of Allmusic, who rated it five out of five stars. Jurek commented:

If an artist ever deserved a box set chronicling her entire career, it is Patsy Cline. Having recorded 102 sides between 1955 and her death at the age of 30 in 1963, Cline changed not only country music forever, but affected the world of pop, as well. Over four CDs, arranged chronologically, the listener gets treated to a story in the development and maturation of a cultural icon who was at least, in terms of her gift, the equal of her legend.

Rolling Stone listed the box set among their "Women Who Rock: 50 Greatest Albums of All-Time" list. Writer Rob Sheffield called Cline "a badass cowgirl drama queen belts some of the torchiest, weepiest country songs ever, hitting high notes that make you sob into your margarita." The Patsy Cline Collection would reach number 29 on the Billboard country albums chart in January 1992. In 1997, MCA released Live at the Cimarron Ballroom, a rare recording that had recently resurfaced. Jeweler Bill Frazee had originally purchased a tape in 1975 that he discovered included Cline's live recording, which took place during July 1961, following Cline's car accident. She appeared at the Cimarron Ballroom in Tulsa, Oklahoma, to give a one-night performance. Included on the record were unreleased live performances and dialog with the audience. The album peaked in the top 40 of the Billboard country albums chart. Cline's former MCA label (now MCA Nashville) continues releasing material to this day. Cline is listed among the Recording Industry of America's bestselling artists, with more than 14 million records sold to date.

=== Film and television ===
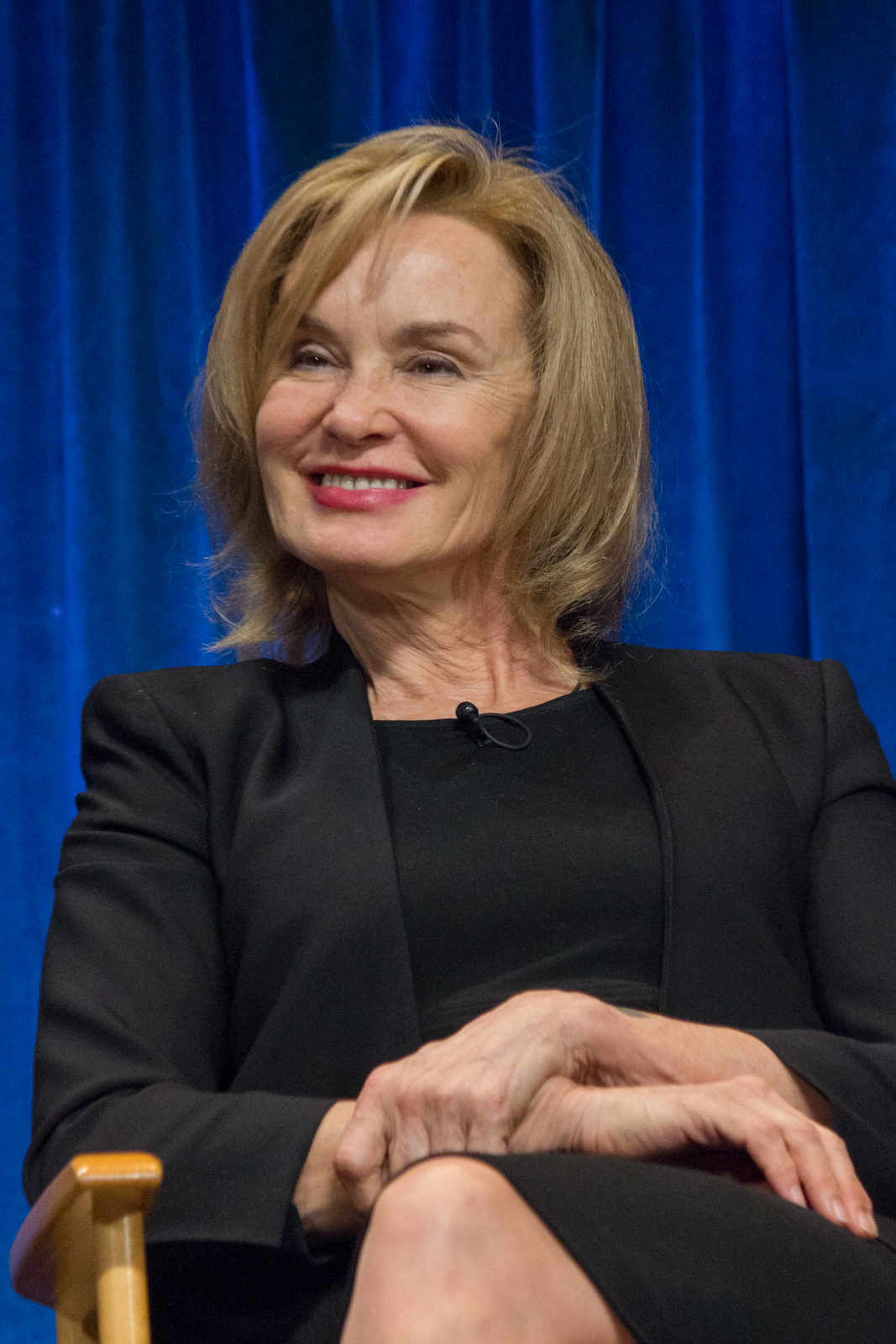
Actress Jessica Lange portrayed Cline in the 1985 Academy Award-nominated biopic Sweet Dreams.

Cline has been portrayed on film and television several times since the 1980s. The Loretta Lynn biopic Coal Miner's Daughter (1980) renewed interest in her life and career. Cline and Lynn's friendship was portrayed in the 1980 film. Actress Beverly D'Angelo played Cline in the movie and did her own singing of Cline's original material. D'Angelo earned a Golden Globe award nomination for her role. In an interview D'Angelo did for a 2017 PBS documentary, playing the role of Patsy Cline "had a profound impact" on her life and career.

In 1985, a feature film about Cline's life was released titled Sweet Dreams. The film starred Jessica Lange as Cline and Ed Harris as husband Charlie Dick. Originally, Meryl Streep auditioned for Cline's role, but ultimately lost to Lange. The film was produced by Bernard Schwartz, who also produced Coal Miner's Daughter. Original ideas called for scenes between Cline and Lynn, but those scenes were ultimately removed from the final script. The film has been criticized for its lack of accuracy to Cline's own life and its musical production. Kurt Wolff wrote, "the soundtrack, however, featured overdubbed versions of Cline's material – better to stick with the originals." Mark Deming of Allmovie only gave the release two out of five stars. Deming commented: "While it's a wise approach to show how her turbulent marriage paralleled her crossover to Countrypolitan ballads, the melodrama tends to overshadow the celebrity story by relegating her rise to stardom to the background. Due to the historically dubious concerts at carnivals and fairgrounds, it appears as though she wasn't as big a star as she actually was." Deming did praise Lange's performance, saying she created a "cheerful and spirited" depiction of Cline. Roger Ebert gave it two stars in his original 1985 review. Ebert said, "There isn't the sense of a well-shaped structure in this movie; there's no clear idea of what the filmmakers thought about Patsy Cline, or what thoughts her life is supposed to inspire." Lange was nominated for an Academy Award for Best Actress for her role as Cline.

Cline was also portrayed in television films. In 1995, a film about the life and career of Cline's friend Dottie West debuted on CBS titled, Big Dreams and Broken Hearts: The Dottie West Story. It included several scenes that showcased West's friendship with Cline. Actress Tere Myers played her in the television movie. Deborah Wilker of the Sun-Sentinel called her performance "terrific" and authentic.

Lifetime aired an original television film Patsy & Loretta in October 2019 on the network. It chronicles Cline's friendship with Loretta Lynn. Cline is portrayed by Megan Hilty and Lynn by Jessie Mueller. The film is directed by the Academy Award-winning screenwriter Callie Khouri. The trailer for the movie was released in July 2019. Patsy & Loretta was filmed on location in Nashville, Tennessee, and is co-produced by Lynn's daughter and Cline's daughter Julie Fudge.

Several documentaries have been made about Cline's life and career. The first was 1989's The Real Patsy Cline, which featured interviews with friends and fellow artists, including Carl Perkins and Willie Nelson. Another documentary was filmed in 1994 titled Remembering Patsy. The show was hosted by country artist Michelle Wright, who read letters Cline wrote to friends and family. It included interviews with several artists, such as Roy Clark, George Jones, and Trisha Yearwood. Both documentaries were produced by Cline's widower Charlie Dick. In March 2017, PBS released a documentary on Cline as part of their American Masters series. The film was narrated by Rosanne Cash and featured interviews with fans of Cline. These interviews included Beverly D'Angelo and Reba McEntire. It also included rare performances of songs such as "Three Cigarettes in an Ashtray" and "Walkin' After Midnight".

=== Plays and musicals ===
Cline's life and career has also been recreated in the theater sector. In 1988, the show Always...Patsy Cline premiered. The show was created by Ted Swindley, who derived it from a friendship Cline had with Texas resident Louise Seger. The pair met while Cline was performing at the Esquire Ballroom in Houston, Texas. Seger brought Cline home following the show and they spent the night together. The pair remained in contact through letters before Cline's death. Much of the script relied on letters exchanged between the two during the course of several years. Seger acts as the show's narrator, and revisits memories she shared with Cline through their letter exchanges. Among the show's original performers was Mandy Barnett, who debuted the show at the Ryman Auditorium in 1994. Barnett would go on to have a music and performing career. A second musical was later released in 1991 titled A Closer Walk with Patsy Cline. The show was written by Dean Regan and has been called a "musical retelling" of Cline's career.

== Artistry ==
=== Influences ===
Cline was influenced by various music artists. Among her earliest influences were pop singers of the 1940s and 1950s. These included Kay Starr, Helen Morgan, Patti Page, and Kate Smith. Patti Page recollected that Cline's husband said to her, "I just wish Patsy could have met you because she just adored you and listened to you all the time and wanted to be like you." Among her primary influences was Kay Starr, of whom Cline was a "fervent devotee" according to The Washington Post. Jack Hurst of the Chicago Tribune remarked that "Her rich, powerful voice, obviously influenced by that of pop's Kay Starr, has continued and perhaps even grown in popularity over the decades." Cline was also attracted to country music radio programs, notably the Grand Ole Opry. According to Mary Bufwack and Robert Oermann, Cline became "obsessed" with the program at a young age. Cline's mother Hilda Hensley commented on her daughter's admiration, "I know she never wanted anything so badly as to be a star on the Grand Ole Opry..." Among performers from the program she admired was Patsy Montana. Cline was also influenced by other types of performers including early rockabilly artist Charline Arthur.

=== Voice and style ===
Cline possessed a contralto voice. Time writer Richard Corliss called her voice "bold". Her voice has also been praised for its display of emotion. Kurt Wolff called it one of the most "emotionally expressive voices in modern country music". Tony Gabrielle of the Daily Press wrote that Cline had "a voice of tremendous emotional power." Cline was at times taken by her own emotion. Husband Charlie Dick recounted that Cline's producer Owen Bradley told him to leave a recording session because she was very emotional and he didn't want to disturb the mood. Cline was once quoted in describing the emotion she felt, saying, "Oh Lord, I sing just like I hurt inside."

During her early career, Cline recorded in styles such as gospel, rockabilly, and honky-tonk. These styles she cut for 4 Star Records have been considered below the quality of her later work for Decca Records. Steve Leggett of Allmusic commented,

Her recordings prior to 1960, though, were something else again, and with the exception of 1956's "Walkin' After Midnight" and perhaps one or two other songs, she seemed reined in and stifled as a singer, even though she was working with the same producer, Owen Bradley, who was to produce her 1960s successes. Oh the difference a song makes, because in the end the material she recorded between 1955 and 1960 – all of which is collected on these two discs – was simply too weak for Cline to turn into anything resembling gold, even with her obvious vocal skills.

Cline's style has been largely associated with the Nashville Sound, a subgenre of country music that linked traditional lyrics with orchestrated pop music styles. This new sound helped many of her singles to cross over onto the Billboard Hot 100 and gain a larger audience that did not always listen to country music. Her producer, Owen Bradley, built this sound onto her Decca recordings, sensing a potential in her voice that went beyond traditional country music. At first, she resisted the pop-sounding style, but was ultimately convinced to record in this new style. Stephen M. Desuner of Pitchfork explained that Cline has been an identifiable factor with the Nashville Sound: "She essentially rewrote their songs simply by singing them, elevating their words and wringing every one of their rhymes for maximum dramatic potential." Mark Deming of Allmusic commented, "Cline and Bradley didn't invent "countrypolitan," but precious few artists managed to meld the sophistication of pop and the emotional honesty of country as brilliantly as this music accomplishes with seemingly effortless grace, and these songs still sound fresh and brilliantly crafted decades after the fact."

=== Image ===
Cline's public image changed during the course of her career. She began her career wearing cowgirl dresses and hats designed by her mother. However, as her music crossed over into pop, she began wearing sequined gowns and cocktail dresses. While she would often wear cowgirl costumes for live performances, she would also wear evening dresses for television and metropolitan performances. For her 1957 performance on Arthur Godfrey's Talent Scouts, the show's producer insisted that Cline wear an evening dress instead of the fringed cowgirl attire she had intended to wear. Her 1962 engagement at the Merri-Mint Theatre in Las Vegas represented this particular image shift. For one of her performances, Cline wore a sequined cocktail dress designed by her mother.

Cline has also been seen as a pioneer for women in country music. She has been cited as an inspiration by many performers in diverse styles of music. Kurt Wolff of Country Music: The Rough Guide said that Cline had an "aggression" and "boisterous attitude" that gained her the respect of her male counterparts. Wolff explained, "She swaggered her way past stereotypes and other forces of resistance, showing the men in charge – and the public in general – that women were more than capable of singing about such hard subjects as divorce and drinking as well as love and understanding. Sean O'Hagan of The Guardian commented that along with Minnie Pearl, Jean Shepard and Kitty Wells, Cline helped prove that country music was not "macho" and that "strong women" could have a "strong voice". In 2013, Diane Reese wrote, "she was what I call a pre-feminist woman. She didn't open doors; she kicked them down." Mary Bufwack and Robert K. Oermann wrote in 2003 that Cline "transformed what it meant to be a female country star".

== Legacy and recognition ==
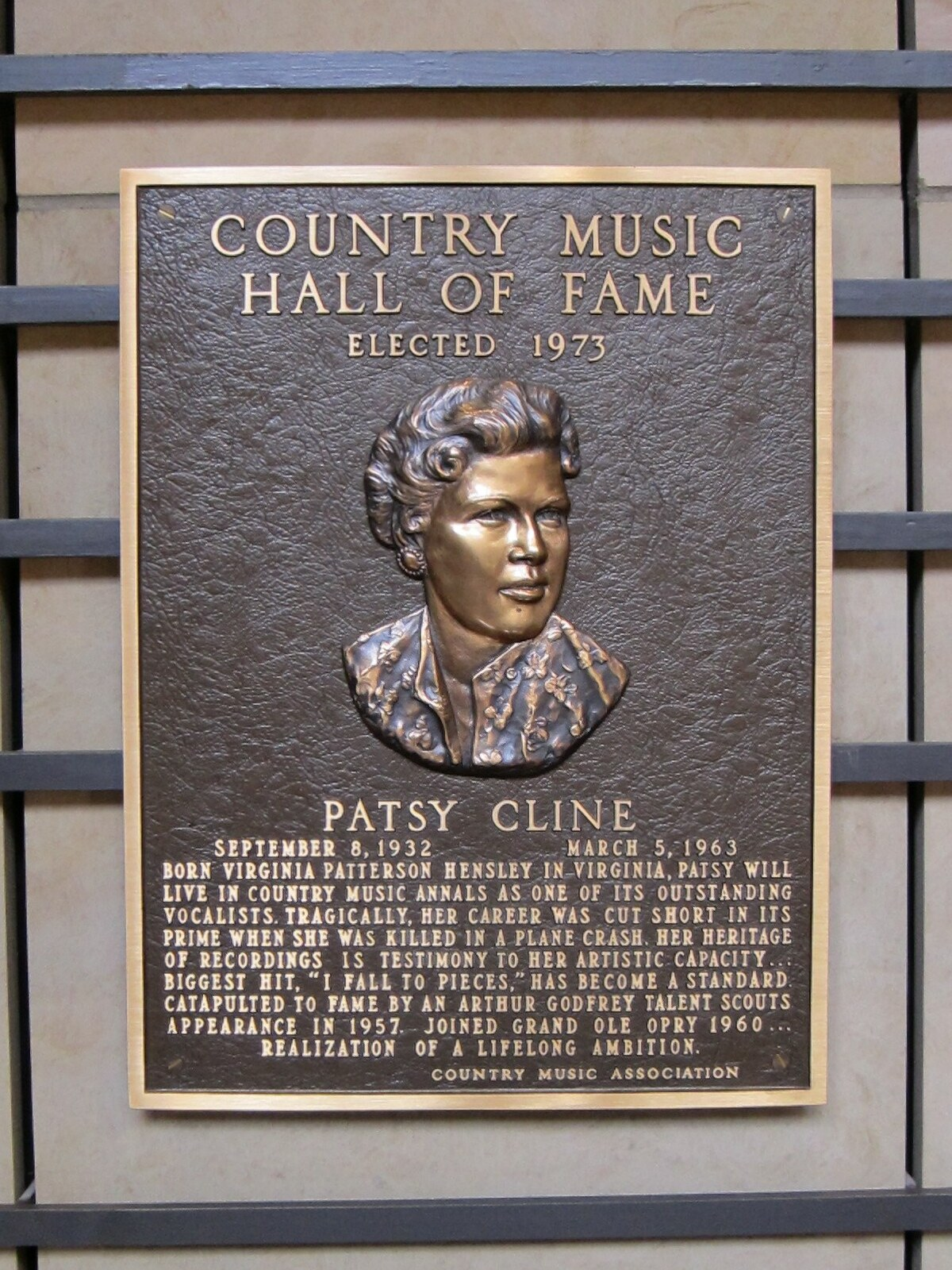
Cline's plaque is located inside the Country Music Hall of Fame and Museum. She was the first female solo artist inducted into that hall.

Cline has been cited in both country and pop music as of one of the greatest vocalists of all time. Her voice has also been called "haunting", "powerful", and "emotional". Cline's emotional expression and delivery of lyrics helped influence various musical genres and artists. With the support of producer Owen Bradley, Cline has been said to "help define" the Nashville Sound style of country music. While the subgenre has received mixed opinions, it has also been said to be a significant part of country music's "authenticity", with Cline being the focal point of the subgenre. Other artists have noted her impact, including LeAnn Rimes who stated, "I remember my dad telling me to listen to the way she told a story... I remember feeling more emotion when she sang than anyone else I had ever heard." Lucinda Williams commented on Cline's vocal talent in helping define her legacy, stating, "Even though her style is considered country, her delivery is more like a classic pop singer... That's what set her apart from Loretta Lynn or Tammy Wynette. You'd almost think she was classically trained."

Cline has been a major influence on various music artists, including Reba McEntire, Loretta Lynn, LeAnn Rimes, k.d. lang, Linda Ronstadt, Trisha Yearwood, Sara Evans, Dottie West, Kacey Musgraves, Margo Price, Cyndi Lauper, Trixie Mattel and Brandi Carlile. Dottie West (also a close friend of Cline's) spoke about her influence on her own career, "I think I was most influenced by Patsy Cline, she said things for people. There was so much feeling in there. In fact, she told me, 'Hoss, if you can't do it with feeling, don't'". In 2019, Sara Evans discussed how Cline has been an influence since she was a young girl, "I learned everything I could learn about her. I tried to mimic her singing to the 't'. We grew up singing in bars — my brothers, sisters and I — from the time I was really little. So I started covering every Patsy Cline song. Then when I first got my record deal I came to Winchester to visit a radio station to try to get them to play my song Three Chords and the Truth."

In 1973, Cline was inducted into the Country Music Hall of Fame. With the induction, she became the first solo female artist to be included. In 1977, Cline's friend and mentee Loretta Lynn released a tribute album titled I Remember Patsy. The record contained covers of Cline's songs, including "Back in Baby's Arms" and "Crazy". The album's lead single was "She's Got You", which would reach the number 1 spot on the Billboard country chart in 1977. In 1995, Cline received a Grammy Lifetime Achievement Award for her legacy and career. Additionally, her hits "I Fall to Pieces" and "Crazy" received inductions into the Grammy Hall of Fame.

In 1993, Cline was included on United States postal stamps as part of their "Legends" series. Other country artists that were included on stamp series were The Carter Family, Hank Williams, and Bob Wills. The stamps were dedicated in an official ceremony at the Grand Ole Opry by Postmaster General Marvin Runyon. In August 1999, Cline received a star on the Hollywood Walk of Fame. The ceremony was attended by her widower Charlie Dick and daughter Julie Fudge. During the 1990s, two of her songs were voted among the "Greatest Juke Box Hits of All-Time". "Crazy" was voted as the number 1 greatest, along with "I Fall to Pieces" ranking at number 17.

Since the late 1990s, she received additional rankings and honors. In 1999, Cline was ranked at number 11 among VH1's list of the "100 Greatest Women of Rock and Roll". In 2003, she was included by Country Music Television on their list of the "40 Greatest Women of Country Music". In 2010, Cline ranked at number 46 on Rolling Stone's list of the "100 Greatest Singers of All-Time". The magazine would rank her on their 2017 list of the "100 Greatest Country Artists of All-Time", where she placed at number 12. In 2023, Rolling Stone ranked Cline at No. 13 on its list of the 200 Greatest Singers of All Time.

Forty years after her death, MCA Nashville released a tribute album entitled Remembering Patsy Cline (2003). A television special also followed around the same time. The album consisted of cover versions of songs taken from Cline's 1967 greatest hits album. It included songs covered by country artists such as Terri Clark and Martina McBride. It also featured artists from other genres such as Michelle Branch, Diana Krall and Patti Griffin.

Cline's hometown of Winchester, Virginia has helped honor her legacy and career. In 1987, the local government approved the placing of markers within the town denoting it as the birthplace of Cline. The same year, a bell tower was erected in her burial location at Shenandoah Memorial Park. The bell tower cost thirty five thousand dollars and was partially funded by Cline's friends Jan Howard and Loretta Lynn. In 2005, Cline's childhood home was given an official on-site marker and included on the National Register of Historic Places. With the development of an organization entitled Celebrating Patsy Cline Inc., renovations began on Cline's childhood home. In August 2011, the Patsy Cline House officially opened as a historic home for tours. In almost three months, about three thousand people visited the home. The home was restored to the era in which Cline lived in it during the 1950s with her mother and siblings. Replicas of furniture and stage clothes are also included. Daughter Julie Fudge spoke of the house in 2011, stating: "I think when you go into the house, you will kind of feel like this is a snapshot of what it would have been like to visit when Mom lived there."

In 2017, the Patsy Cline Museum opened in Nashville, Tennessee, located at 119 3rd Ave. S., on the second floor in the same building as the Johnny Cash Museum. The museum includes Cline's actual stage costumes, as well as her original scrapbook and record albums. It also features other artifacts such as the soda fountain machine from Gaunt's Drug Store where Cline worked as a teenager. Original letters that Cline wrote to friends are also included in the museum's collection.

== Discography ==
Studio albums

- 1957: Patsy Cline
- 1961: Showcase
- 1962: Sentimentally Yours

Compilation albums

- 1964: A Portrait of Patsy Cline
- 1964: That's How a Heartache Begins
- 1980: Always
