= Always (Patsy Cline album) =

Studio album by Patsy Cline
- Released: 1980
- Recorded: 1960s
- Genre: Country; Traditional pop
- Label: MCA
- Producer: Owen Bradley

Patsy Cline chronology
In Care of the Blues (1969)	Always (1980)	Sweet Dreams (1985)

Professional ratings
Review scores
Source	Rating
AllMusic	3/5 stars
Billboard	(unrated)

Always is an album released in 1980, promoting some material of country singer Patsy Cline's work from the 1960s.

The album included an overdub single in 1980 titled "Always". The song peaked at No. 18 on the US country singles chart that year, and it was a return to prominence for Cline.

AllMusic reports that, "In 1980, Bradley took ten of Cline's master tapes and wiped everything but the original lead vocals, brought in a cast of session folks, backup singers, and string players and remade vintage tunes."

== Track listing ==
No.	Title	Writer(s)	Length
1.	"Always"	Irving Berlin	2:47
2.	"Love Letters in the Sand"	Nick Kenny; Charles Kenny; John Frederick Coots	2:58
3.	"Crazy Arms"	Ralph Mooney; Charles Seals	2:11
4.	"Bill Bailey, Won't You Please Come Home"	Hughie Cannon	2:31
5.	"Have You Ever Been Lonely (Have You Ever Been Blue)"	Peter DeRose; Billy Hill	3:24
6.	"You Made Me Love You (I Didn't Want to Do It)"	Joseph McCarthy; James V. Monaco	3:48
7.	"I Can See An Angel"	Kay Adelman	2:39
8.	"That's My Desire"	Carroll Loveday; Helmy Kresa	2:43
9.	"Your Cheatin' Heart"	Hank Williams	2:12
10.	"That's How a Heartache Begins"	Harlan Howard	2:24
11.	"I Love You So Much, It Hurts"	Floyd Tillman	2:24
12.	"Half as Much"	Curley Williams	2:31
13.	"You Belong to Me"	Pee Wee King; Redd Stewart; Chilton Price	3:06

== Personnel ==
Track information and credits adapted from AllMusic.

=== Musicians ===
- Patsy Cline – vocals
- David Briggs – piano
- Jerry Carrigan – drums
- Johnny Christopher – acoustic guitar
- Sonny Garrish – steel guitar
- Mike Leech – bass, baritone sax
- Kenny Malone – drums
- Billy Sanford – electric guitar
- Reggie Young – electric guitar

=== Production ===
- Owen Bradley – producer
- Milan Bogdan – remastering
- Jim Lloyd – remastering
- Benny Quinn – remastering
- Glenn Meadows – remastering
- Jerry Joyner – design
- Simon Levy – art direction
- Virginia Team – art direction

== Charts ==
Chart (1980)	Peak position
US Top Country Albums (Billboard)	27

=== Singles ===
Year	Title	Chart	Position
1980	"Always"	US Hot Country Songs (Billboard)	18
