= Charlie Dick =

American Linotype operator (1934–2015)

- Born: Charles Allen Dick; May 24, 1934; Whitehall, Virginia, U.S.
- Died: November 8, 2015 (aged 81); Nashville, Tennessee, U.S.
- Resting place: Shenandoah Memorial Park Winchester, Virginia
- Occupation: Linotype operator
- Years active: 1956–2015
- Known for: Being the widower of Patsy Cline
- Spouses: Patsy Cline (m. 1957; died 1963); Jamey Ryan (m. 1965; div. 1970)
- Children: 3

Charles Allen Dick (May 24, 1934 – November 8, 2015) was an American Linotype operator who became the husband and musical promoter of country singer Patsy Cline.

== Early life ==
Dick was born on May 24, 1934, near Whitehall, Virginia. He later moved to Winchester and worked as a Linotype operator for a local newspaper after high school.

== Patsy Cline ==
Dick met Cline during a dance in Winchester in 1956, and they started dating. He married her in Winchester on September 15, 1957. After their marriage, they moved to Fayetteville, North Carolina, where he was working as a Linotype operator at Fort Bragg. They moved back to Winchester in 1959 and remained married until 1963 when Cline died in a plane crash.

They had two children together, Julie Sidamore (a misspelling of Simadore) and Allen Randolph (Randy).

== Later life ==
After Cline's death, even though money wasn't a problem as royalty checks were still coming in, Dick went back to work, this time as a record promoter for Starday Records, a record label that was based in Nashville, Tennessee. Dick married country singer Jamey Ryan in 1965 and they divorced in 1970, having one child, Charles "Chip" Dick Jr. He later took part in many documentaries on Patsy Cline.

According to Rolling Stone, "Throughout his life, Dick worked to preserve the legacy of Cline." Wide Open Country called Dick "a lifelong champion of [Cline's] music" and "dedicated to keeping Patsy's legacy alive". The Tennessean referred to Dick as "a champion of her legacy for the last five decades."

After Coal Miner's Daughter came out in 1980, spurring interest in Cline, Dick played a part in having her albums re-released as The Patsy Cline Collection in 1991. In 1997, he worked on the release of Patsy Cline: Live at the Cimarron Ballroom, a recording of a 1961 concert. This recording placed on the Billboard Country Albums Top 40 chart.

Dick died at his home in Nashville on November 8, 2015. He was 81 years old.

He is buried alongside Patsy Cline at Shenandoah Memorial Park in Winchester.
