= Barrie Kaufman =

Fashion designer

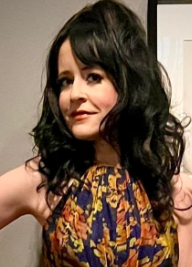
- Barrie Kaufman at Alexander McQueen exhibit, Frist Art Museum (2024)
- Born: October 20, 1981 (age 44); Kelley, Iowa, U.S.
- Education: University of Iowa
- Occupation: Fashion designer
- Years active: 2007 –
- Label: Fables by Barrie
- Website: fablesbybarrie.com

Barrie Kaufman (born October 20, 1981) is an American fashion designer and costume designer. She is the sole owner of the Fables by Barrie label. Known for her designs of retro garments and western wear inspired clothing, Kaufman has consistently worked on music industry projects and with various celebrities including Dolly Parton, Sierra Ferrell, Hailey Whitters, Miranda Lambert, Lainey Wilson, Kacey Musgraves and Carrie Underwood.

== Career ==
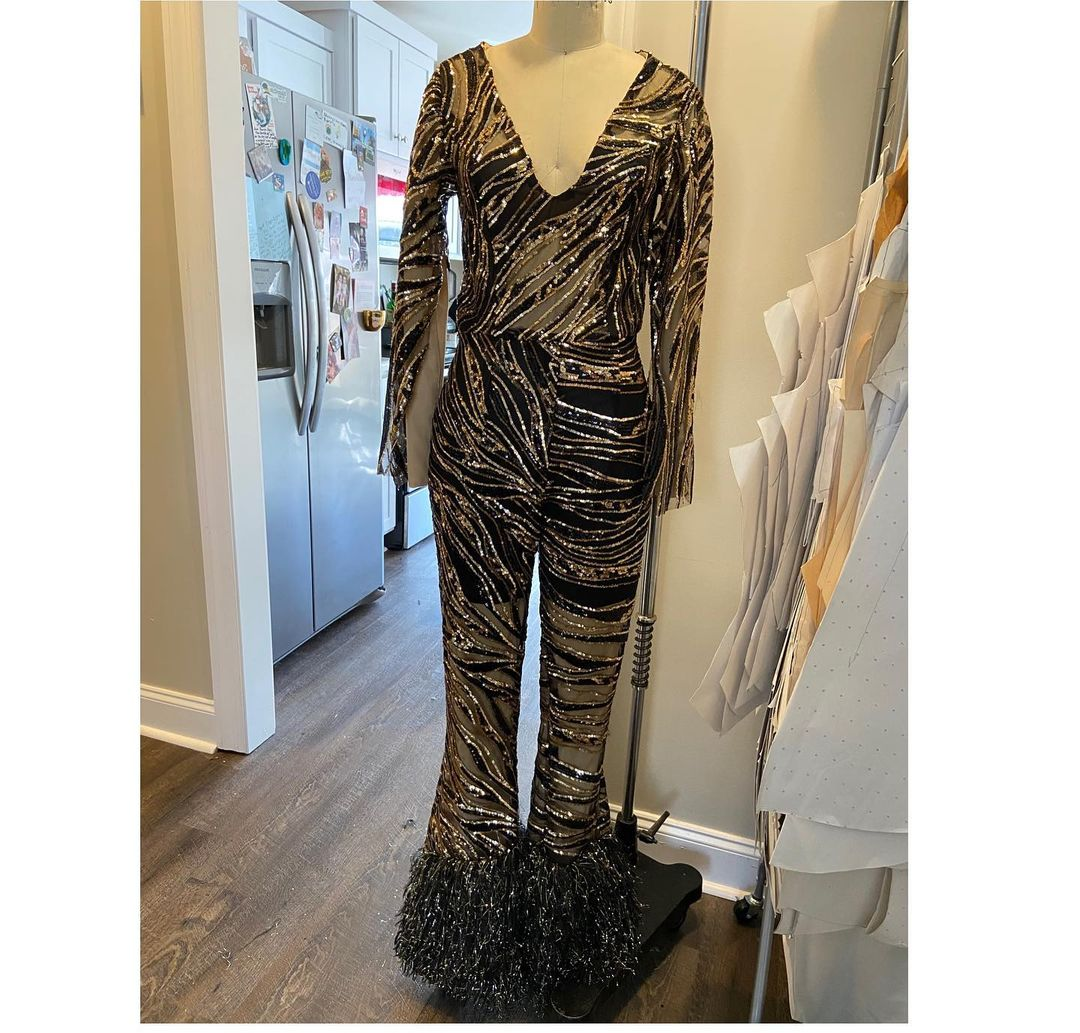
Sequin mohair jumpsuit for Carrie Underwood (2021)

In 2007, Kaufman began her label Fables by Barrie as a swimwear line inspired by 1950's pinups and vintage influences. The red, white and blue retro sailor swimsuit has become a well-known style selling worldwide in South America, Israel, Puerto Rico and Australia.

Kaufman's embellishment work for Steve Summers is featured in Dolly Parton's Behind the Seams: My Life in Rhinestones.

Barrie Kaufman created a custom stage look for country singer Carrie Underwood's tour, REFLECTION: The Las Vegas Residency in 2021.

In 2024, Kaufman designed stage wear featured on singer Sierra Ferrell's during her Jimmy Kimmel performance of "Fox Hunt" from the Trail of Flowers album.

== Awards and honors ==
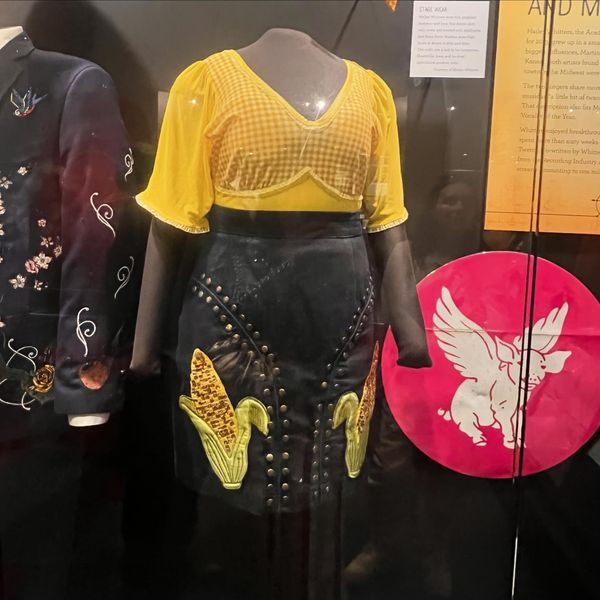
The corn skirt for country singer Hailey Whitters, Country Music Hall of Fame and Museum (2023)

Kaufman's stage wear designs are featured in the Country Music Hall of Fame and Museum in Nashville, Tennessee. In 2023, multiple costumes were displayed including the corn skirt worn by country music singer-songwriter, Hailey Whitters and a jumpsuit customized by Kaufman for Miranda Lambert in 2021.
