= Jerry Lee Atwood (clothing designer) =

Fashion designer

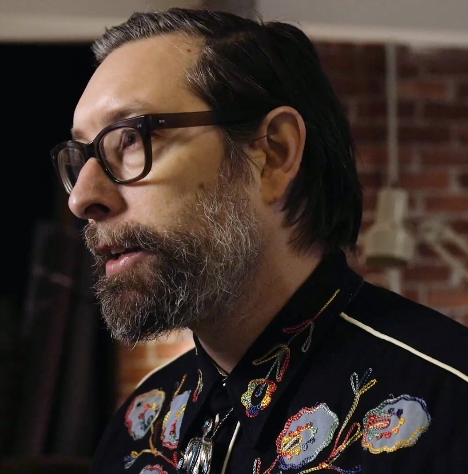
- Atwood in 2018
- Born: September 13, 1975 (age 50); Lafayette, Indiana, U.S.
- Occupation: Fashion designer
- Label: Union Western
- Website: unionwestern.com

Jerry Lee Atwood (born September 13, 1975) is an American fashion designer specializing in western wear and chainstitch embroidery. Atwood was featured in the February issue of Vogue and the United States of Fashion: A New Atlas of American Style from Rizzoli Books in 2021.

== Career ==
Atwood's influences include 20th-century western tailors Nathan Turk, Rodeo Ben, and Nudie Cohn, as well as couture dress designer Charles James and fashion designer Alexander McQueen. These inspirations shape his unique approach to fashion design, balancing tradition and modernity.

=== Union Western ===
Union Western Clothing is featured in the documentary, Chain Stitched: The Work of Jerry Lee Atwood from Grass Fed Cinema in 2018. The Highwomen wear Union Western originals on their album cover, along with singer Joshua Hedley, Foo Fighters guitarist Chris Shiflett, and other country stars including Nikki Lane. Atwood has a long list of celebrity clients including Lil Nas X, DJ and music producer Diplo, Post Malone, actor David Harbour and NFL player Von Miller.

==== Lil Nas X ====
In 2019, Atwood designed the suit worn by Lil Nas X in the "Old Town Road" video with Billy Ray Cyrus.

==== Post Malone ====
Grammy Award winner Post Malone wore a Union Western suit to the 2018 American Music Awards.

== Awards and honors ==
=== Country Music Hall of Fame ===
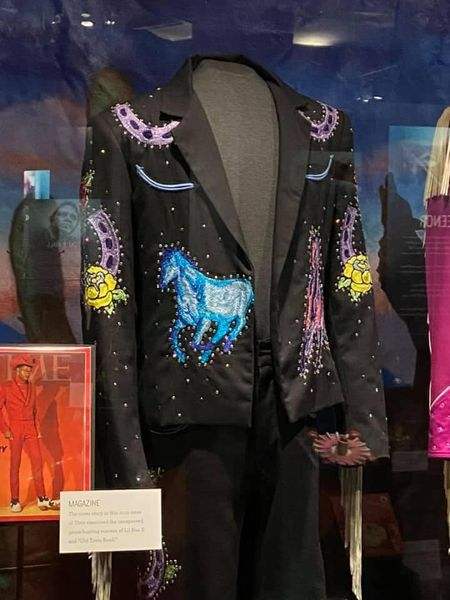
"Old Town Road" chain stitch jacket for Lil Nas X, Country Music Hall of Fame and Museum (2020)

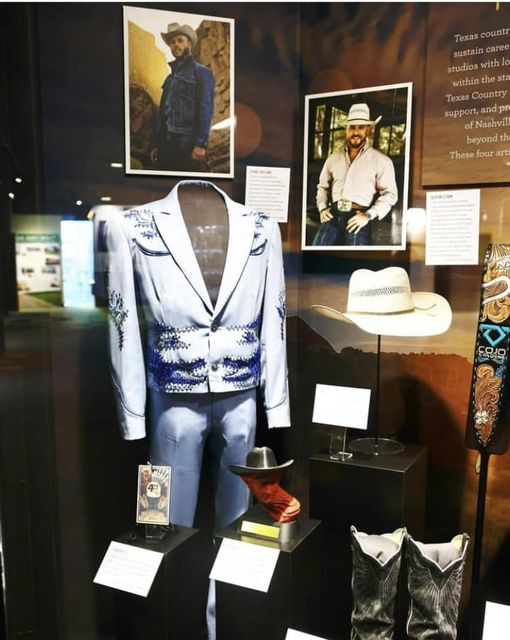
Stage wear for Charley Crockett, Country Music Hall of Fame and Museum (2023)

The Country Music Hall of Fame and Museum in Nashville, Tennessee has featured Atwood's western wear in their exhibits including a chain stitch jacket worn by Lil Nas X in the "Old Town Road" music video, stage wear for country music performer Charley Crockett and a jacket designed for singer Amanda Shires of The Highwomen.
