= Patsy Cline posthumous discography =

Patsy Cline discography
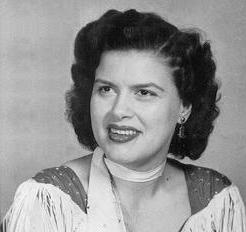
- Patsy Cline publicity photograph, 1957.
- Studio albums: 4
- Soundtrack albums: 1
- Live albums: 3
- Compilation albums: 42
- Singles: 35
- Video albums: 4
- Music videos: 2
- Box sets: 1
- Other appearances: 1

The posthumous discography of American singer Patsy Cline consists of recordings released after March 5, 1963. Since her death, Cline's record label and other labels have released numerous studio albums, compilation albums and singles. Decca Records (Cline's label at the time of her death) planned to release Cline's fourth studio album at the time of her death. Instead, a compilation was released in June 1963 titled The Patsy Cline Story. The album reached number 9 on the Billboard country albums list and number 74 on the pop albums chart. Two singles posthumously released in 1963 became top 10 hits on the Billboard country songs chart: "Sweet Dreams (Of You)" and "Faded Love". Following the release of two posthumous studio albums, Decca issued Patsy Cline's Greatest Hits in 1967. It was the highest-selling female country album for 28 years until Shania Twain surpassed her record in 1995. Greatest Hits was reissued multiple times and eventually was certified diamond in sales in the United States.

In 1980, MCA Records released versions of Cline's music with new backing tracks overdubbed onto the original vocals. This included a single, "Always", and a posthumous studio album of overdubbed material. Overdubbed duets were also released between Cline and deceased artist Jim Reeves. These duets appeared on albums, including Remembering Patsy Cline & Jim Reeves (1982). Singles between the artists were also issued, including "Have You Ever Been Lonely?". The song reached number 5 on the Billboard country songs chart. along with a similarly constructed digital duet, I Fall to Pieces which appeared on the RCA compilation album Greatest Hits of Jim Reeves & Patsy Cline along with solo hits by the two artists.

In 1985, Cline's film biopic, Sweet Dreams was released, spawning a soundtrack of the same name. The soundtrack certified gold in the United States. Cline's original vocals were again overdubbed with new backing tracks for the recording. The movie brought renewed interest to her recordings, sparking labels to reissue and re-release material This included 1985's Heartaches (which certified platinum), Songwriter's Tribute (1986), The Last Sessions (1988), and Faded Love (1988). MCA also released an album of live material recorded at the Grand Ole Opry called Live at the Opry. The label also released her first box set, The Patsy Cline Collection (1991). It certified platinum and peaked at number 29 on the Billboard country albums chart.

In 1990, Cline's two previous hit singles ("I Fall to Pieces" and "Crazy") became hits in the United Kingdom. The 1995 compilation Patsy Cline Sings Songs of Love sold one million records in the United States. In 1999, Mercury Records released Patsy Cline Duets, Volume 1, which peaked at number 67 on the Top Country Albums chart. Its first single, a duet with John Berry reached a minor position on the Billboard country chart. Additionally, 2005's Patsy Cline Gold reached number 43 while 2008's Collector's Edition reached number 71 on the Billboard country albums list. Among her recent releases was 2012's Icon which peaked at number 38 on the country albums chart. Patsy Cline has sold 15 million records posthumously according to the Recording Industry Association of America.

== Studio albums ==
List of albums, with selected chart positions, showing other relevant details
Title	Album details	Peak chart positions
Title	Album details	US Country
A Portrait of Patsy Cline	Released: June 15, 1964; Label: Decca; Formats: LP	—
Always	Released: 1980; Label: MCA; Formats: LP, cassette	27
Patsy Cline Duets, Volume 1	Released: September 14, 1999; Label: Mercury/Private Music; Formats: Cassette, CD	67
"—" denotes a recording that did not chart or was not released in that territory.

== Compilation albums ==
=== 1960s–1980s ===
List of albums, with selected chart positions and certifications, showing other relevant details
Title	Album details	Peak chart positions				Certifications
Title	Album details	US	US Cou.	CAN Cou.	UK	Certifications
The Patsy Cline Story	Released: June 10, 1963; Label: Decca; Formats: LP	74	9	14	—	RIAA: Platinum
That's How a Heartache Begins	Released: November 2, 1964; Label: Decca; Formats: LP	—	—	—	—	
Here's Patsy Cline	Released: July 5, 1965; Label: Vocalion; Formats: LP	—	—	—	—	
Patsy Cline's Greatest Hits	Released: March 13, 1967; Label: Decca; Formats: LP	—	17 (Note: Patsy Cline's Greatest Hits was reissued in 1988 and re-titled as 12 Greatest Hits. The updated version reached number 27 on the Billboard Top Country Albums chart.)	—	—	RIAA: Diamond
Country Great!	Released: 1969; Label: Vocalion; Formats: LP	—	—	—	—	
The Country Hall of Fame – Patsy Cline	Released: 1979; Label: MCA; Formats: LP	—	—	—	—	
Greatest Hits: Jim Reeves & Patsy Cline	Released: 1981; Label: RCA; Formats: LP, cassette	—	8	—	—	
Remembering Patsy Cline & Jim Reeves	Released: 1982; Label: MCA; Formats: LP, cassette	—	—	—	—	RIAA: Gold
Today, Tomorrow, and Forever	Released: 1985; Label: MCA; Formats: LP, cassette	—	—	—	—	
Heartaches	Released: 1985; Label: MCA Special Products; Formats: CD, cassette	—	—	—	—	RIAA: Platinum
Stop, Look & Listen	Released: 1986; Label: MCA; Formats: LP, cassette	—	—	—	—	
Songwriter's Tribute	Released: 1986; Label: MCA; Formats: LP, cassette	—	—	—	—	
Faded Love	Released: 1988; Label: MCA; Formats: Cassette, CD	—	—	—	—	
The Last Sessions	Released: 1988; Label: MCA; Formats: Cassette, CD	—	—	—	—	
Dreaming...	Released: October 19, 1988; Label: Prism; Formats: LP	—	—	—	55	
Walkin' Dreams: Her First Recordings, Volume 1	Released: January 30, 1989; Label: Rhino; Formats: Cassette, CD	—	—	—	—	
Hungry for Love: Her First Recordings, Volume 2	Released: January 30, 1989; Label: Rhino; Formats: Cassette, CD	—	—	—	—	
The Rockin' Side: Her First Recordings, Volume 3	Released: January 30, 1989; Label: Rhino; Formats: Cassette, CD	—	—	—	—	
"—" denotes a recording that did not chart or was not released in that territory.

=== 1990s–2010s ===
List of albums, with selected chart positions and certifications, showing other relevant details
Title	Album details	Peak chart positions				Certifications
Title	Album details	US	US Cou.	CAN Cou.	UK	Certifications
Best of Patsy Cline	Released: 1991; Label: Curb; Formats: Cassette, CD	—	—	—	—	
The Definitive Patsy Cline	Released: May 9, 1992; Label: Arcade; Formats: Cassette, CD	—	—	—	11	
At Her Best	Released: August 29, 1992; Label: Hollywood; Formats: Cassette, CD	—	63	—	—	
Forever and Always	Released: September 22, 1992; Label: Epic; Formats: CD	—	—	—	—	
Loved and Lost Again	Released: July 15, 1993; Label: Sony Special Products; Formats: CD	—	—	—	—	
In Care of the Blues	Released: October 19, 1993; Label: Rhino; Formats: CD	—	—	—	—	
Walkin' After Midnight	Released: October 19, 1993; Label: Rhino; Formats: CD	—	—	—	—	
The Best of Patsy Cline	Released: 1994; Label: MCA; Formats: CD	—	—	—	—	BPI: Gold
Patsy Cline Sings Songs of Love	Released: July 4, 1995; Label: MCA Special Products; Formats: CD	—	—	—	—	RIAA: Platinum
Patsy Cline Sings More Great Songs of Love	Released: August 1, 1995; Label: MCA Special Products; Formats: CD	—	—	—	—	
The Very Best of Patsy Cline	Released: 1995; Label: Castle Communications; Formats: CD	—	—	—	21	BPI: Gold
Birth of a Country Legend	Released: 1996; Label: Razor & Tie; Formats: CD	—	—	13	—	
The Essential Patsy Cline	Released: February 11, 1997; Label: RCA; Formats: CD	—	—	—	—	
The Ultimate Collection	Released: February 3, 1998; Label: Crimson; Formats: CD	—	49	—	—	
20th Century Masters: The Millennium Collection	Released: July 20, 1999; Label: MCA Nashville; Formats: CD	—	—	—	—	
The Ultimate Collection	Released: October 17, 2000; Label: Universal; Formats: CD	—	—	—	—	
True Love: A Standards Collection	Released: April 25, 2000; Label: MCA Nashville; Formats: Cassette, CD	—	—	—	—	
The Essential Collection	Released: 2001; Label: Spectrum; Formats: CD	—	—	—	—	BPI: Silver
The Definitive Collection	Released: June 24, 2004; Label: MCA Nashville; Formats: CD	—	52	—	—	
Patsy Cline: Gold	Released: March 1, 2005; Label: MCA Nashville; Formats: CD, music download	—	43	—	—	
Patsy Cline: Collector's Edition	Released: August 14, 2007; Label: Madacy; Formats: CD	—	73	—	—	
Playlist Your Way: Patsy Cline	Released: August 5, 2008; Label: MCA Nashville; Formats: CD	—	—	—	—	
Icon: Patsy Cline	Released: August 31, 2010; Label: MCA Nashville; Formats: CD	197	38	—	—	
Icon 2: Patsy Cline	Released: August 31, 2010; Label: MCA Nashville; Formats: CD	—	—	—	—	
Deluxe: Greatest Hits	Released: July 30, 2012; Label: Puzzle; Formats: CD	—	70	—	—	
"—" denotes a recording that did not chart or was not released in that territory.

== Other albums ==
=== Soundtracks ===
List of albums, with selected chart positions and certifications, showing other relevant details
Title	Album details	Peak chart positions				Certifications
Title	Album details	US	US Cou.	AUS	UK	Certifications
Sweet Dreams	Released: September 16, 1985; Label: MCA; Formats: LP, cassette	29	6	47	18	BPI Silver; RIAA: Gold

=== Box sets ===
List of albums, with selected chart positions and certifications, showing other relevant details
Title	Album details	Peak chart positions		Certifications
Title	Album details	US	US Cou.	Certifications
The Patsy Cline Collection	Released: October 22, 1991; Label: MCA; Formats: Cassette, CD	166	23	RIAA: Platinum

=== Live albums ===
List of albums, with selected chart positions, showing other relevant details
Title	Album details	Peak chart positions
Title	Album details	US Country
Live at the Opry	Released: April 4, 1988; Label: MCA; Formats: LP, cassette, CD	60
Live Volume Two	Released: 1989; Label: MCA; Formats: LP, cassette, CD	—
Live at the Cimarron Ballroom	Released: July 29, 1997; Label: MCA Nashville; Formats: Cassette, CD	32
"—" denotes a recording that did not chart or was not released in that territory.

== Singles ==
List of singles, with selected chart positions, showing other relevant details
Title	Year	Peak chart positions						Certifications	Album
Title	Year	US	US Cou.	US AC	CAN	CAN Cou.	UK	Certifications	Album
"Sweet Dreams (Of You)"	1963	44	5	15	32	—	—		The Patsy Cline Story
"Faded Love"	1963	96	7	—	—	—	—		A Portrait of Patsy Cline
"When You Need a Laugh"	1963	—	47	—	—	—	—		A Portrait of Patsy Cline
"Your Kinda Love"	1964	—	—	—	—	—	—		A Portrait of Patsy Cline
"That's How a Heartache Begins"	1964	—	—	—	—	—	—		That's How a Heartache Begins
"He Called Me Baby"	1964	—	23	—	—	—	—		That's How a Heartache Begins
"Your Cheatin' Heart"	1965	—	—	—	—	—	—		—N/a
"Just a Closer Walk with Thee, Part 1"	1965	—	—	—	—	—	—		—N/a
"South of the Border (Down Mexico Way)"	1965	—	—	—	—	—	—		—N/a
"I Love You So Much It Hurts"	1965	—	—	—	—	—	—		—N/a
"Shoes"	1966	—	—	—	—	—	—		—N/a
"Lonely Street"	1966	—	—	—	—	—	—		—N/a
"That's My Desire"	1966	—	—	—	—	—	—		—N/a
"You Took Him Off My Hands"	1967	—	—	—	—	—	—		—N/a
"Have You Ever Been Lonely (Have You Ever Been Blue)"	1967	—	—	—	—	—	—		—N/a
"True Love"	1967	—	—	—	—	—	—		—N/a
"Always"	1968	—	—	—	—	—	—		—N/a
"You Made Me Love You (I Didn't Want to Do It)"	1968	—	—	—	—	—	—		—N/a
"Anytime"	1968	—	73	—	—	—	—		—N/a
"Crazy Arms"	1969	—	—	—	—	—	—		—N/a
"Life's Railway to Heaven"	1978	—	98	—	—	—	—		—N/a
"Always" (Note: This version of "Always" was electronically re-recorded with new instrumentation beside Cline's original lead vocal.)	1980	—	18	—	—	21	—		Always
"I Fall to Pieces" (Note: This version of "I Fall to Pieces" was electronically re-recorded with new instrumentation beside Cline's original lead vocal.)	1980	—	61	—	—	—	—		Always
"Have You Ever Been Lonely (Have You Ever Been Blue)" (with Jim Reeves)	1981	—	5	—	—	1	—		Greatest Hits: Jim Reeves & Patsy Cline
"I Fall to Pieces" (with Jim Reeves)	1982	—	54	—	—	41	—		Remembering
"Crazy" (Note: "Crazy" was re-released internationally as a single in both 1987 and 1991.)	1987	—	—	—	—	—	79	BPI: Silver; RMNZ: Gold	—N/a
"Crazy" (Note: "Crazy" was re-released internationally as a single in both 1987 and 1991.)	1990	—	—	—	—	—	14		The Definitive Patsy Cline
"I Fall to Pieces" (Note: "I Fall to Pieces" was re-released internationally as a single in 1991.)	1991	—	—	—	—	—	87		The Definitive Patsy Cline
"There He Goes" (with John Berry)	1999	—	70	—	—	—	—		Patsy Cline Duets, Volume 1
"Walkin' After Midnight"	2021	—	—	—	—	—	—		—N/a
"—" denotes a recording that did not chart or was not released in that territory.

== Other charted songs ==
List of charted songs, with selected chart positions, showing other relevant details
Title	Year	Peak chart positions	Album	Notes
Title	Year	US Bubb.	Album	Notes
"Someday (You'll Want Me to Want You)"	1964	23	A Portrait of Patsy Cline	(Note: B-side to "Your Kinda Love".)

== Videography ==
=== Video albums ===
List of video albums, showing all relevant details
Title	Album details	Certifications
The Real Patsy Cline	Release date: April 16, 1985; Label: Hallway Productions; Formats: VHS	RIAA: Platinum
Remembering Patsy Cline	Release date: September 9, 1997; Label: White Star; Formats: VHS	
Sweet Dreams Still: The Anthology	Release date: September 27, 2005; Label: MPI Home Video; Formats: DVD	
Crazy - A Portrait of Patsy Cline	Release date: July 21, 2006; Label: Immortal; Formats: DVD	

=== Music videos ===
List of music videos, showing year released and director
Title	Year	Director(s)	Ref.
"Sweet Dreams (Of You)"	1985	Phil MacDonald	
"Crazy"	1991	John Lloyd Miller	

== Other appearances ==
List of album guest appearances, showing year released and album name
Title	Year	Other artist(s)	Album	Ref.
"Lovesick Blues"	1993	Loretta Lynn; Dolly Parton; Tammy Wynette	Honky Tonk Angels	

== See also ==
- Patsy Cline discography
