= The Ultimate Collection (2000 Patsy Cline album) =

Compilation album by Patsy Cline
- Released: October 17, 2000
- Recorded: 1955–1961
- Genre: Country
- Length: 82:12
- Label: Universal Music Group

Patsy Cline chronology
| True Love: A Standards Collection (2000) | The Ultimate Collection (2000) | The Definitive Collection (2004) |

Professional ratings
Review scores
| Source | Rating |
|---|---|
| AllMusic | 5/5 stars |

The Ultimate Collection is a 2000 compilation album by Patsy Cline. The album mostly consists of her album songs from 1960-1964, with a couple of the songs being recorded pre-1960.

== Legacy ==
In 2003, The Ultimate Collection was ranked number 234 in Rolling Stone's The 500 Greatest Albums of All Time, with the ranking slipping to number 235 in a 2012 update and climbing to number 229 in its 2020 list.

== Track listing ==
=== Disc 1 ===
1. "Walkin' After Midnight" – 2:35
2. "A Poor Man's Roses (Or a Rich Man's Gold)" – 2:47
3. "Lovesick Blues" – 2:18
4. "I Fall to Pieces" – 2:48
5. "True Love" – 2:08
6. "San Antonio Rose" – 2:20
7. "Crazy" – 2:44
8. "Have You Ever Been Lonely (Have You Ever Been Blue)" – 2:12
9. "South of the Border (Down Mexico Way)" – 2:26
10. "Strange" – 2:12
11. "I Love You So Much It Hurts" – 2:15
12. "Foolin' Around" – 2:13
13. "Bill Bailey, Won't You Please Come Home" – 2:48
14. "She's Got You" – 3:00
15. "Heartaches" – 2:12
16. "Your Cheatin' Heart" – 2:20

=== Disc 2 ===
1. "Anytime" – 1:59
2. "So Wrong" – 3:01
3. "Half as Much" – 2:28
4. "When I Get Thru With You (You'll Love Me Too)" – 2:39
5. "Imagine That" – 2:55
6. "When You Need a Laugh" – 2:50
7. "Why Can't He Be You" – 3:27
8. "Back in Baby's Arms" – 2:04
9. "Leavin' on Your Mind" – 2:25
10. "Faded Love" – 3:45
11. "Someday (You'll Want Me to Want You)" – 2:51
12. "Blue Moon of Kentucky" – 2:10
13. "Always" – 2:42
14. "He Called Me Baby" – 2:41
15. "Crazy Arms" – 2:25
16. "Sweet Dreams" – 2:32
