= The Definitive Collection (Patsy Cline album) =

Compilation album by Patsy Cline
- Released: 2004
- Recorded: 1956–1963
- Genre: Country; rockabilly; pop
- Label: MCA

Patsy Cline chronology
The Ultimate Collection (2000)	The Definitive Collection (2004)	Gold (2005)

Professional ratings
Review scores
Source	Rating
AllMusic	5/5 stars
Tom Hull	A−

The Definitive Collection is an album released by MCA records and is a compilation of country singer Patsy Cline's work.

This is one of Patsy Cline's better-known compilations. The album consists of all Cline's big late-1950s and early-1960s hits. Unlike the massive-selling 12 Greatest Hits album, the version of "Walkin' After Midnight" on this album is the original version, not the remake. It also features her signature tune, "Crazy", as well as her other big hit "I Fall to Pieces", along with her 1963 hits, and even singles released after her death, like "He Called Me Baby" and "Always".

== Track listing ==
No.	Title	Writer(s)	Length
1.	"Walkin' After Midnight"	Alan Block, Donn Hecht	2:35
2.	"A Poor Man's Roses (Or a Rich Man's Gold)"	Milton De Lugg, Bob Hilliard	2:47
3.	"Lovesick Blues"	Cliff Friend, Irving Mills	2:20
4.	"I Fall to Pieces"	Hank Cochran, Harlan Howard	2:48
5.	"True Love"	Cole Porter	2:08
6.	"San Antonio Rose"	Bob Wills	2:20
7.	"Crazy"	Willie Nelson	2:44
8.	"Strange"	Fred Burch, Mel Tillis	2:12
9.	"She's Got You"	Cochran	2:59
10.	"Heartaches"	Al Hoffman, John Klenner	2:11
11.	"Half as Much"	Curley Williams	2:29
12.	"When I Get Through with You"	Howard	2:39
13.	"Imagine That"	Justin Tubb	2:55
14.	"So Wrong"	Carl Perkins, Danny Dill, Tillis	3:01
15.	"Why Can't He Be You"	Cochran	3:26
16.	"Leavin' on Your Mind"	Wayne Walker	2:25
17.	"When You Need a Laugh"	Cochran	2:50
18.	"Back in Baby's Arms"	Bob Montgomery	2:03
19.	"Faded Love"	B. Wills, John Wills	3:45
20.	"Always"	Irving Berlin	2:42
21.	"He Called Me Baby"	Howard	2:41
22.	"Sweet Dreams (Of You)"	Don Gibson	2:32

== Critical reception ==
The Definitive Collection received a perfect five stars from William Ruhlmann of AllMusic. In his review, Ruhlmann describes the collection as "an excellent single-disc sampler of Patsy Cline."

== Chart performance ==
The Definitive Collection peaked at number 52 on the U.S. Billboard Top Country Albums chart. It has sold 180,300 copies in the United States as of October 2019.

Chart (2004)	Peak position
U.S. Billboard Top Country Albums	52
