= I Remember Patsy =

Studio album by Loretta Lynn
- Released: April 4, 1977
- Recorded: June 11, 1975 – December 10, 1976
- Studio: Bradley's Barn, Mount Juliet, Tennessee
- Genre: Country
- Label: MCA

Loretta Lynn chronology
Somebody Somewhere (1976)	I Remember Patsy (1977)	Dynamic Duo (1977)

Singles from I Remember Patsy
- 1. "She's Got You" Released: February 7, 1977; 2. "Why Can't He Be You" Released: July 18, 1977

Professional ratings
Review scores
Source	Rating
AllMusic	3/5 stars
Christgau's Record Guide	B+
The Rolling Stone Album Guide	3.5/5 stars

I Remember Patsy is a studio album by American country music singer-songwriter Loretta Lynn. It was produced by Owen Bradley, who produced many of Patsy Cline's hits. The album was released on April 4, 1977, by MCA Records.

== Commercial performance ==
The album peaked at No. 2 on the Billboard Top Country Albums chart. The album's first single, "She's Got You", peaked at No. 1 on the Billboard Hot Country Songs chart, Lynn's tenth solo single to top the chart. The second single, "Why Can't He Be You", peaked at No. 7.

== Recording ==
Recording sessions for the album took place on September 28 and December 1 and 10, 1976, at Bradley's Barn in Mount Juliet, Tennessee. Two songs on the album were recorded during previous recording sessions. "I Fall to Pieces" was recorded on June 11, 1975, during a session for 1975's Home. "She's Got You" was recorded during the June 30, 1976, session for Somebody Somewhere. The album's closing track, "I Remember Patsy...A Conversation", is an excerpt from an interview with the record's producer, Owen Bradley.

== Track listing ==
Side one
No.	Title	Writer(s)	Recording date	Length
1.	"She's Got You"	Hank Cochran	June 30, 1976	3:04
2.	"Walkin' After Midnight"	Alan Block, Donn Hecht	December 1, 1976	2:18
3.	"Why Can't He Be You"	Hank Cochran	September 28, 1976	3:40
4.	"Faded Love"	Bob Wills, John Wills, Billy Jack Wills	December 1, 1976	2:53
5.	"I Fall to Pieces"	Hank Cochran, Harlan Howard	June 11, 1975	2:44

Side two
No.	Title	Writer(s)	Recording date	Length
1.	"Crazy"	Willie Nelson	June 30, 1976	2:45
2.	"Sweet Dreams"	Don Gibson	December 10, 1976	2:35
3.	"Back in Baby's Arms"	Bob Montgomery	September 28, 1976	2:04
4.	"Leavin' on Your Mind"	Wayne Walker, Webb Pierce	September 28, 1976	2:19
5.	"I Remember Patsy...A Conversation"			7:11

== Personnel ==
- Harold Bradley – bass
- Owen Bradley – producer
- David Briggs – piano
- Johnny Christopher – guitar
- Lloyd Green – steel guitar
- Johnny Gimble – fiddle
- The Jordanaires – backing vocals
- Mike Leech – bass
- Kenny Malone – drums
- Grady Martin – guitar
- Charlie McCoy – harmonica, vibes
- Hargus Robbins – piano
- Hal Rugg – steel guitar
- Pete Wade – guitar
- Bobby Wood – piano

== Chart positions ==
Album – Billboard (North America)

Year	Chart	Peak position
1977	Country Albums	2

Singles – Billboard (North America)

Year	Single	Chart	Peak position
1977	"She's Got You"	Country Singles	1
1977	"Why Can't He Be You"	Country Singles	7
