= Faded Love (disambiguation) =

"Faded Love" is a 1950 song by Bob Wills.

Faded Love may also refer to:

- Faded Love (album), a 1988 album by Patsy Cline
- "Faded Love", a 2004 song by pre)Thing from 22nd Century Lifestyle
- "Faded Love" (Tinashe song), 2018
- "Faded Love", a 2021 song by Leony
- Faded Love, a 1985 novel from the Hank the Cowdog series by John R. Erickson
