= The Last Sessions (Patsy Cline album) =

Compilation album by Patsy Cline
- Released: 1988
- Recorded: February 4–7, 1963
- Genre: Country
- Length: 66:27
- Label: MCA
- Producer: Owen Bradley

Patsy Cline chronology
Faded Love (1988)	The Last Sessions (1988)	Live at the Opry (1988)

Professional ratings
Review scores
Source	Rating
Allmusic	3/5 stars

The Last Sessions is a compilation album by American country music artist, Patsy Cline. The album was released in 1988 under MCA Records and was produced by Owen Bradley. The album was a collection material Cline had recorded during her last recording sessions for Decca Records in early 1963.

== Background ==
The album contains ten of twelve total tracks of material Cline had recorded between February 4–7, 1963, shortly before her death in a plane crash a month later. The album contained the major hit, "Sweet Dreams", which would peak at #4 on the Billboard Magazine Hot Country Songs chart and #44 on the Billboard Pop Chart after her death March 5, 1963. "He Called Me Baby" would also be issued as a single, peaking at #23 on the Billboard Country Chart in 1964. The Last Sessions primarily included a series of Pop standards from the 1940s and 1950s. Songs such as Irving Berlin's "Always" and Pat Boone's "Love Letters in the Sand" were recorded in February. Four country music standards are also featured, such as Bill Monroe's "Blue Moon of Kentucky" and Ray Price's "Crazy Arms."

The material was originally released along with B-sides and other previously unreleased tracks across three posthumous studio albums The Patsy Cline Story (June, 1963), A Portrait of Patsy Cline (June, 1964) and That's How a Heartache Begins (Nov. 1964). The tracks on this release, save for Faded Love and I'll Sail My Ship Alone which were omitted, are presented in their original production order, as the album was never programmed as a cohesive unit as originally planned.

The album was remastered and was transferred digitally by Glenn Meadows, Milan Bogdan, Jim Loyd and Benny Quinn at Masterfonics. and is available on vinyl, cassette and CD,

The album was given three out of five stars by allmusic.

== Track listing ==
No.	Title	Writer(s)	Length
1.	"Someday (You'll Want Me to Want You)"	Jimmie Hodges	2:49
2.	"Love Letters in the Sand"	J. Fred Coots; Charles F. Kenny; Nick A. Kenny	2:20
3.	"Blue Moon of Kentucky"	Bill Monroe	2:02
4.	"Sweet Dreams (Of You)"	Don Gibson	2:33
5.	"Always"	Irving Berlin	2:40
6.	"Does Your Heart Beat for Me"	Arnold Johnson; Russ Morgan; Mitchell Parnish	2:37
7.	"Bill Bailey, Won't You Please Come Home"	Hughie Cannon	2:37
8.	"He Called Me Baby"	Harlan Howard	2:20
9.	"Crazy Arms"	Ralph Mooney; Chuck Seals	2:23
10.	"You Took Him Off My Hands"	Howard; Skeets McDonald; Wynn Stewart	2:37

Notes

- The first and last tracks to be recorded in the sessions —"Faded Love" (February 4) and "I'll Sail My Ship Alone" (February 7)—do not appear in this compilation.

== Personnel ==
Musicians

- Patsy Cline – lead vocals
- Harold Bradley – electric bass
- Floyd Cramer – piano
- Ray Edenton – rhythm guitar
- Buddy Harman – drums
- Randy Hughes – rhythm guitar
- Joe Jenkins – acoustic bass
- The Jordanaires – background vocals
- Grady Martin – electric guitar
- Bill Pursell – vibraphone

Production

- Owen Bradley – producer
- Milan Bogodan; Benny Quinn – remastering, tape preparation
- Jim Lloyd – remastering
- Jay Orr; Don Roy – liner notes
- Jerry Joyner – design
- Simon Levy; Virginia Team – art direction
- Michael Ochs – photography
