= Patsy Cline's Greatest Hits =

Greatest hits album by Patsy Cline
- Released: March 13, 1967
- Recorded: November 16, 1960 – February 7, 1963
- Genre: Country, traditional pop
- Length: 32:59
- Label: Decca
- Producer: Owen Bradley

Patsy Cline chronology
| Here's Patsy Cline (1965) | Patsy Cline's Greatest Hits (1967) | Country Great! (1969) |

1988 12 Greatest Hits cover
- When this album was digitally remastered in a CD format in 1988, the cover was changed, as well as the title, 12 Greatest Hits.

Professional ratings
Review scores
| Source | Rating |
|---|---|
| AllMusic | 5/5 stars |
| CD Universe | 4.5/5 stars |

Patsy Cline's Greatest Hits is a compilation consisting of the American country music singer Patsy Cline's greatest hits, the ones released between 1957 and 1963. It is one of the biggest-selling albums in the United States by any female country music artist.

== Background ==
Patsy Cline's Greatest Hits was released four years after her death in 1967 by Decca Records, Cline's longtime record label. Among its twelve tracks, the album contains seven of Cline's Top 10 country hits between 1957 and 1963.

Upon Cline's induction into the Country Music Hall of Fame in 1973, the album was reissued by MCA Records and went Gold again. In 1988, the album was reissued again on a CD format with a different cover art and was retitled 12 Greatest Hits. In 2003, the album was digitally remastered and was reissued under MCA Records again with the original 1967 cover art. Bob Ludwig digitally remastered the album in 2003, making the album sound smoother.

== Chart performance and record sales ==
In 1967, the original album release peaked at number 17 on the Billboard Top Country Albums chart. After the album was digitally remastered and reissued under the title, 12 Greatest Hits, the album charted again on the Top Country Albums chart at number 27. No singles were spawned from the album.

In 1989, Patsy Cline's Greatest Hits was certified double-Platinum (two million copies) by the RIAA, making Cline the first female in country music to achieve this level of sales.

The album is currently in Guinness World Records for staying the most weeks on the US Country Chart by a female artist. The album was still on the chart in 2001, 722 weeks after it originally entered the charts. According to Billboard chart records, under its original title, the album was on the Top Country Albums chart for 24 weeks. After its reissue under the title of 12 Greatest Hits, the album will spend 191 cumulative weeks on the same chart while spending 290 cumulative weeks on the Catalog Albums chart.

By 2005, the album had sold 10 million copies in the United States, receiving a certification of 10× multi-Platinum or Diamond by the Recording Industry Association of America. Making it easily the single highest selling album never to chart on the Billboard 200. Patsy Cline's Greatest Hits was the largest-selling album by a female country artist up until Shania Twain's The Woman in Me sold 12 million copies in the United States.

== Individual tracks ==
The album contains Patsy Cline's signature hits but also includes several songs that were never hits on the American Country or Pop Top 100 Charts.

"Walkin' After Midnight" was released in 1957 and reached number 2 on the Country charts and number 12 on the Billboard Top 100. It was released while Cline was still under her Four Star Records contract. The version on the Greatest Hits collection is a 1961 rerecording.

"Sweet Dreams" was released in 1963 following Cline's death. It reached number 5 on the Billboard Country chart, number 44 on the Billboard Hot 100 and number 12 on Billboard Easy Listening.

"Crazy", by songwriter and singer Willie Nelson, was released by Cline in 1961. It went to number 2 on Billboard's Country chart, number 2 Easy Listening, and number 9 on the Hot 100.

"I Fall to Pieces" was released in 1961; it was number 1 on Billboard's Country chart, number 12 on the Hot 100 and number 6 Easy Listening.

"So Wrong" was released in 1962. It was one of Cline's lesser hits, reaching number 14 Country and number 85 on the Hot 100.

"Strange" was the B-side of "She Got You", released in 1962.

"Back in Baby's Arms" was the B-side of "Sweet Dreams", released following Cline's death in 1963. It was a number 1 hit in Australia briefly in 1963.

"She's Got You" was released in 1962. It was number 1 Country, number 14 Hot 100, and number 3 Easy Listening.

"Faded Love", a cover of a Bob Wills song, was released after Cline's death in 1963. It reached number 7 on the U.S. Country charts and number 96 on the Hot 100. It was first released on album on the Greatest Hits collection.

"Why Can't He Be You" was the B-side of Clines' 1962 single "Heartaches". It had minor chart success, reaching number 7 on the US Bubbling Under Hot 100. It also reached the number 107 position on the U.S. pop charts.

"You're Stronger Than Me" was the B-side to the 1962 single "So Wrong", which reached number 103 Pop. This collection contains a faster version recorded earlier but never released.

"Leavin' on Your Mind" was Cline's last single to be released before her death in 1963. It reached number 8 Country and number 83 on the Hot 100.

Charted songs that did not make this collection include:

- "A Poor Man's Roses" (1957 – number 14 U.S. Country),
- "Who Can I Count On?" (1961 – number 99 U.S. Pop),
- "When I Get Thru With You" (1962 – number 10 U.S. Country / number 52 U.S. Pop),
- "Imagine That" (1962 – number 21 U.S. Country / number 90 U.S. Pop),
- "You're Stronger Than Me" (B-side version) (1962 – number 103 U.S. Pop),
- "Heartaches" (1962 – number 73 U.S. Pop), "When You Need a Laugh" (1963 – number 47 U.S. Country),
- "Someday" (1964 – number 123 U.S. Pop), and "He Called Me Baby" (1964 – number 23 U.S. Country).

== Track listing ==
=== 1967 and 1973 original LP version ===
Side 1

1. "Walkin' After Midnight" – 2:00 (Don Hecht, Alan Block)
2. "Sweet Dreams (of You)" – 2:35 (Don Gibson)
3. "Crazy" – 2:45 (Willie Nelson)
4. "I Fall to Pieces" – 2:51 (Hank Cochran, Harlan Howard)
5. "So Wrong" – 3:03 (Carl Perkins)
6. "Strange" – 2:15 (Fred Burch, Mel Tillis)

Side 2

1. "Back in Baby's Arms" – 2:06 (Bob Montgomery)
2. "She's Got You" – 3:01 (Cochran)
3. "Faded Love" – 3:45 (Bob Wills, John Wills)
4. "Why Can't He Be You" – 3:28 (Cochran)
5. "You're Stronger Than Me" – 2:54 (Cochran, Jimmy Key)
6. "Leavin' on Your Mind" – 2:27 (Wayne Walker, Webb Pierce)

=== 1988 and 2003 CD version ===
The song lengths remain the same on the reissued releases.

1. "Walkin' After Midnight"
2. "Sweet Dreams (Of You)"
3. "Crazy"
4. "I Fall to Pieces"
5. "So Wrong"
6. "Strange"
7. "Back in Baby's Arms"
8. "She's Got You"
9. "Faded Love"
10. "Why Can't He Be You"
11. "You're Stronger Than Me"
12. "Leavin' on Your Mind"

== Personnel ==
The album's tracks were recorded between November 16, 1960, and February 7, 1963, in Nashville, Tennessee.

- Harold Bradley – electric bass
- Patsy Cline – vocals
- Floyd Cramer – piano, organ
- Ray Edenton – rhythm guitar
- Hank Garland – electric guitar
- Buddy Harman – drums
- Walter Haynes – steel guitar
- Randy Hughes – rhythm guitar
- Joe Jenkins – acoustic bass
- The Jordanaires – background vocals
- Doug Kirkham – drums
- Millie Kirkham – background vocals
- Grady Martin – electric guitar
- Bob Moore – acoustic bass
- Bill Pursell – organ, vibraphone
- Hargus "Pig" Robbins – piano
- Rita Faye Wilson – autoharp

== Charts ==
Album – Billboard (North America)

| Year | Chart | Position |
|---|---|---|
| 1967 | Top Country Albums | 17 |
| 1988 | Top Country Albums | 27 |

=== Year-end charts ===
2001 year-end chart performance for Patsy Cline's Greatest Hits
| Chart (2001) | Position |
|---|---|
| Canadian Country Albums (Nielsen SoundScan) | 31 |

2002 year-end chart performance for Patsy Cline's Greatest Hits
| Chart (2002) | Position |
|---|---|
| Canadian Country Albums (Nielsen SoundScan) | 46 |

== See also ==
- List of best-selling albums in the United States
