= Sweet Dreams (soundtrack) =

Soundtrack album by Patsy Cline
- Released: September 16, 1985
- Genre: Country
- Length: 28:54
- Label: MCA
- Producer: Owen Bradley

Patsy Cline chronology
Heartaches (1985)	Sweet Dreams (1985)	Stop, Look & Listen (1986)

Singles from Sweet Dreams
- 1. "Sweet Dreams" Released: October 1985

Professional ratings
Review scores
Source	Rating
Allmusic	4.5/5 stars
Q Magazine	3/5 stars

Sweet Dreams is the 1985 soundtrack album to the movie of the same name, starring Jessica Lange and Ed Harris about the life of country music star, Patsy Cline. The soundtrack is composed entirely of songs previously recorded and released by Patsy Cline.

== Recording ==
Patsy Cline's original producer, legendary Nashville producer Owen Bradley produced the soundtrack. For half of the song selections, including Walkin' After Midnight, Bradley combined Cline's original vocal tracks with new orchestrations recorded at his own Bradley's Barn studio in Mount Juliet, Tennessee, in 1984. The music was then remixed by Doug Crider at Bradley's Music City Music Hall on Nashville's Music Row.

== Promotion and release ==
The album was released following the movie. Originally released on LP, the soundtrack was reissued in CD format later in 1990. The lead single from the soundtrack, "Sweet Dreams", a song that had been a big hit for Cline in 1963, was released to promote the album and film. David Hepworth in Q Magazine described the album as "a more than reasonable introduction to Cline's work".

== Commercial performance ==
The film's soundtrack album itself charted at #6 on the Billboard Top Country Albums chart in 1985.

In April 1987, Sweet Dreams was certified Gold by the RIAA for shipments of over 500,000 copies in the United States.

== Track listing ==
Side 1:

1. "San Antonio Rose" — (Bob Wills) 2:20
  - Overdubbed
2. "Seven Lonely Days" — (Marshall Brown, Alden Shuman, Earl Shuman) 2:14
  - Overdubbed
3. "Your Cheatin' Heart" — (Hank Williams) 2:21
  - Overdubbed
4. "Lovesick Blues" — (Hank Williams) 2:18
5. "Walkin' After Midnight" — (Alan Block, Don Hecht) 2:01
  - Overdubbed
6. "Foolin' 'Round" — (Harlan Howard, Buck Owens) 2:11
  - Overdubbed

Side 2:

1. "Half as Much" — (Curley Williams) 2:48
  - Overdubbed
2. "I Fall to Pieces" — (Hank Cochran, Harlan Howard) 2:46
3. "Crazy" — (Willie Nelson) 2:41
4. "Blue Moon of Kentucky" — (Bill Monroe) 2:02
  - Overdubbed
5. "She's Got You" — (Hank Cochran) 2:58
6. "Sweet Dreams (Of You)" — (Don Gibson) 2:33

== Personnel ==
- Byron Bach — cello
- Brenton Banks — violin
- George Binkley III — violin
- Roger Bissell — trombone
- Milan Bogodan — tape preparation
- Harold Bradley — guitar
- Owen Bradley — guitar, producer
- David Briggs — piano
- Cecil Brower — violin
- Cole Burgess — alto saxophone
- James Capps — electric guitar
- Jimmy Capp — electric guitar
- Howard Carpenter — violin
- Gene Chrisman — drums
- Patsy Cline — lead vocals
- Floyd Cramer — piano
- Doug Crider — remixing, remastering
- Jimmy Day — steel guitar
- Ray Edenton — guitar
- Solie Fott — violin
- Hank Garland — guitar
- Barry Green — trombone
- Buddy Harman — drums, tom tom
- Walter Haynes — steel guitar
- Randy Hughes — guitar
- Lillian Hunt — violin
- Tommy Jackson — fiddle
- Ben Keith — steel guitar
- Ron Keller — trumpet
- Douglas Kirkham — drums
- Sam Levine — saxophone
- Grady Martin — guitar
- Glenn Meadows — remastering, tape preparation
- Joe Mills — assistant engineer
- Bob Moore — bass
- Billy Puett — saxophone
- Bill Pursell — organ, vibraphone
- Verna Richardson — violin
- Hargus Pig Robbins — piano
- Paul Ross — piano
- Hal Rugg — steel guitar
- Don Sheffield — trumpet
- Buddy Skipper — saxophone
- Dennis Sole — saxophone
- Buddy Spicher — fiddle
- Gordon Stoker — vocals
- Henry Strzelecki — bass
- George Todwell — trumpet
- Wilda Tinsley — violin
- Bill Vandevort — engineer
- Pete Wade — electric guitar
- Gary Williams — violin

=== Background vocals ===
- Arleen Harden
- Bobby Harden
- Hoyt Hawkins
- The Jordanaires
- Neal Matthews
- Ray C. Walker
- Curtis Young

== Charts ==
=== Weekly charts ===
Chart (1985–1991)	Peak position
Australia Albums (Kent Music Report)	47
Canada Top Albums/CDs (RPM)	86
UK Albums (Official Charts)	18
US Billboard 200	29
US Top Country Albums (Billboard)	6

=== Year-end charts ===
Chart (1986)	Position
US Top Country Albums (Billboard)	43
