= Heartaches (Patsy Cline album) =

Compilation album by Patsy Cline
- Released: 1985
- Recorded: November 16, 1960 – February 5, 1963
- Genre: Country
- Length: 26:19
- Label: MCA

Patsy Cline chronology
Today, Tomorrow, and Forever (1985)	Heartaches (1985)	Sweet Dreams (1985)

Professional ratings
Review scores
Source	Rating
Allmusic	3/5 stars

Heartaches is a compilation album, first released in 1985, containing some of the hit singles by country music singer, Patsy Cline. It was released by the MCA Special Products division of MCA Records. A simultaneous release titled "The Best of Patsy Cline" featured the same programming.

Heartaches is a 10-track collection that includes some of Patsy Cline's biggest hits such as "Crazy", "I Fall to Pieces", and "Walkin' After Midnight." The album overlooks most of Cline's essential songs. Upon its release, a cassette version was also issued but only contained the first eight tracks. In 1997 it was remastered and reissued with the original version of "Walkin' After Midnight".

On March 30, 2000, the album was certified Platinum by the RIAA for shipments of over one million copies in the United States.

== Track listing ==
1. "Crazy" — (Willie Nelson) 2:42
2. "I Fall to Pieces" — (Hank Cochran, Harlan Howard) 2:49
3. "Heartaches — (Al Hoffman, John Klenner) 2:10
4. "She's Got You" — (Hank Cochran) 2:58
5. "Walkin' After Midnight" — (Alan Block, Don Hecht) 2:00 / 2:31
  - Reissued with the original version of this song in 1997.
6. "Sweet Dreams (Of You)" — (Don Gibson) 2:34
7. "You Belong to Me" — (Pee Wee King, Chilton Price, Redd Stewart) 3:03
8. "Strange" — (Fred Burch, Mel Tillis) 2:13
9. "Anytime" — (Herbert Happy Lawson) 1:57
10. "The Wayward Wind" — (Stanley Lebowsky, Herb Newman) 3:22

== Year-end charts ==
Chart (2001)	Position
Canadian Country Albums (Nielsen SoundScan)	45

Chart (2002)	Position
Canadian Country Albums (Nielsen SoundScan)	58
