= Out of a Dream (Reba McEntire album) =

Studio album by Reba McEntire
- Released: August 27, 1979
- Length: 29:54
- Label: Mercury
- Producer: Jerry Kennedy

Reba McEntire chronology
Reba McEntire (1977)	Out of a Dream (1979)	Feel the Fire (1980)

Alternative cover

Singles from Out of a Dream
- 1. "Last Night, Ev'ry Night" Released: September 1978; 2. "Runaway Heart" Released: February 1979; 3. "That Makes Two of Us" Released: June 1979; 4. "Sweet Dreams" Released: September 1979; 5. "(I Still Long to Hold You) Now and Then" Released: December 1979

Out of a Dream is the second studio album by American singer Reba McEntire. It was released on August 27, 1979, through Mercury Records. The first single from the album, "Last Night, Ev'ry Night", was McEntire's first top 30 hit, and the fourth single from the album, a cover of "Sweet Dreams", was her first top 20 hit.

== Singles ==
Out of a Dream spawned five singles. "Last Night, Ev'ry Night" reached number 18 on the US Hot Country Songs, while "Runaway Heart", "That Makes Two of Us", cover of Patsy Cline's "Sweet Dreams", "(I Still Long To Hold You) Now And Then" peaked at numbers 36, 26, 19, and 40, respectively. "Sweet Dreams" became her first top-20 hit as a solo artist.

== Release ==
Mercury Records released Out of a Dream on August 27, 1979, as McEntire's second studio album. It was released in CD format twice, the second time with alternate album's cover artwork. Out of a Dream includes the song "Daddy", the first song written by McEntire to be included on one of her albums, and a cover of the Christine Kittrell's song, "I'm a Woman". The album failed to chart on the US Billboard 200.

== Critical reception ==
Professional ratings
Review scores
Source	Rating
AllMusic	4/5 stars

AllMusic believed that Out of a Dream features more pop sounds than her previous work, highlighting the tracks "Runaway Heart", "Daddy", and "It's Gotta Be Love".

== Track listing ==
Side one
No.	Title	Writer(s)	Recording date	Length
1.	"(I Still Long to Hold You) Now and Then"	Jerry Fuller	February 6, 1979	2:33
2.	"Daddy"	Reba McEntire	February 7, 1979	3:05
3.	"Last Night, Ev'ry Night"	Bob Morrison; Jim Zerface; Bill Zerface	March 1978	2:59
4.	"Make Me Feel Like a Woman Wants to Feel"	Dana Collins	February 7, 1979	2:38
5.	"That Makes Two of Us" (with Jacky Ward)	Fuller	August 1978	2:55

Side two
No.	Title	Writer(s)	Recording date	Length
1.	"Sweet Dreams"	Don Gibson	February 7, 1979	2:59
2.	"I'm a Woman"	Jerry Leiber, Mike Stoller	February 7, 1979	3:48
3.	"Rain Fallin'"	Charlie Black	February 6, 1979	3:17
4.	"Runaway Heart"	Paul Harrison	March 7, 1978	2:56
5.	"It's Gotta Be Love"	Terry Skinner; J. L. Wallace	February 7, 1979	2:44

== Personnel ==
Credits were adapted from AllMusic.

- Billy Buett – banjo
- Jerry Carrigan – drums, percussion
- Gene Chrisman – drums, percussion
- Johnny Christopher – guitar
- Buddy Harman – drums, percussion
- Hoyt Hawkins – backing vocals
- The Jordanaires – backing vocals
- Mike Leech – bass
- Gordon Kennedy – guitar
- Jerry Kennedy – guitar
- Millie Kirkman – backing vocals
- The Shelly Kurland Strings – strings (1, 3, 5, 6, 9)
- Reba McEntire – lead and backing vocals
- Neal Matthews – backing vocals
- Laverna Moore – backing vocals
- Weldon Myrick – steel guitar
- Hargus "Pig" Robbins – acoustic piano, keyboards
- Henry Strzelecki – bass
- Gordon Stoker – backing vocals
- Pete Wade – guitar
- Ray C. Walker – backing vocals
- Jacky Ward – lead vocals (5)
- Bergen White – string and flute arrangements (1, 3, 5, 6, 9)
- Trish Williams – backing vocals

=== Production ===
- Bob Defrin – art direction, design (remastered edition)
- Jerry Kennedy – producer
- Ken Kim – photography
- Brent King – assistant engineer
- Gary N. Mayo – digital remastering
- Mike Psanos – assistant engineer
- MC Rather – mastering
- Jim Schubert – art direction, design
- Tom Sparkman – engineer
- Tommy Strong – assistant engineer
- Traci Werbel – project coordinator
