= Remembering Patsy Cline & Jim Reeves =

Compilation album by Patsy Cline and Jim Reeves
- Released: 1982
- Genre: Country
- Length: 27:15
- Label: MCA
- Producer: Chet Atkins, Owen Bradley, Bob Ferguson

Patsy Cline chronology
Greatest Hits of Jim Reeves & Patsy Cline (1981)	Remembering Patsy Cline & Jim Reeves (1982)	Today, Tomorrow, and Forever (1985)

Jim Reeves chronology
Greatest Hits of Jim Reeves & Patsy Cline (1981)	Remembering Patsy Cline & Jim Reeves (1982)	The Jim Reeves Medley (1983)

Professional ratings
Review scores
Source	Rating
Allmusic	3/5 stars

Remembering Patsy Cline & Jim Reeves is a tribute album released in 1982 remembering the music of country stars Patsy Cline and Jim Reeves who were both killed in plane crashes in the early 1960s. It was released by MCA Records. A similar album called Greatest Hits of Jim Reeves & Patsy Cline had been released the previous year by RCA Records.

== Background ==
The album contains popular hit singles by both artists on each side of the album. However the first Jim Reeves track, I Fall to Pieces was overdubbed with Patsy Cline's version to form a duet. This was possible only because in Nashville's early 60's music scene when both hits were recorded, both Chet Atkins at RCA and Owen Bradley at Decca had access to then-brand-new 3-track mastering recorders. In this format, the orchestra was recorded on one track, the backup singers on another track, and the lead vocal on the third. This recording setup was intended for mixdown to mono in the end.

Owen Bradley had been approached by Jim Reeves' widow, Mary Reeves Davis, with the idea of creating Jim Reeves and Patsy Cline duets. With the approval of the Cline estate, as well as both RCA Records and MCA Records, work on the project began. In early 1981, Owen simply played the original 3-track tapes and recorded both Patsy's and Jim's isolated vocals onto a 24-track tape. As the two performances were recorded a semitone apart in key, subsequently, at Music City Music Hall in Nashville (the former RCA Studio A), engineers matched the keys for the two vocals, edited it all down and recorded the final onto still another 24-track tape onto which they added new orchestration, new backing tracks and remixed for stereo. RCA's similar album, Greatest Hits of Jim Reeves & Patsy Cline has the same treatment for the other song from the session.

As the original Decca label with which Cline had been under contract to, had since been merged with MCA, six Patsy Cline songs and five Jim Reeves songs are featured on that album, plus the duet. Jim Reeves had recorded exclusively for RCA Victor, so the RCA album has the reverse — six Jim Reeves hits and five Patsy Cline hits, plus a duet of Have You Ever Been Lonely?, produced during the same sessions as the duet for I Fall to Pieces.

The songs were both released as a single from the albums in question. Have You Ever Been Lonely? charted at #5 in 1982 and I Fall to Pieces charted at #54 the same year. Each was the only song overdubbed on its respective album.

The tracks recorded by Cline (including the duet) were produced by Decca/MCA's Owen Bradley, Cline's original record producer. Reeves' recordings were produced by RCA's Chet Atkins and Bob Ferguson on Side One of the album, while the recordings on Side Two were produced by Chet alone. The reverse is true for the RCA album. The album was digitally remastered and issued on CD in 1988.

In 1997 the album was certified Gold by the RIAA for a shipment of over 500,000 copies in the United States.

== Track listing ==
Side one
No.	Title	Writer(s)	Performer(s)	Length
1.	"I Fall to Pieces" (duet)	Hank Cochran, Harlan Howard	Patsy Cline & Jim Reeves	2:48
2.	"So Wrong"	Danny Dill, Carl Perkins, Mel Tillis	Patsy Cline	3:00
3.	"Misty Moonlight"	Cindy Walker	Jim Reeves	2:01
4.	"Back in Baby's Arms"	Bobby Montgomery	Patsy Cline	2:06
5.	"Missing You"	Dale Noe, Red Sovine	Jim Reeves	2:39

Side two
No.	Title	Writer(s)	Performer	Length
1.	"Walkin' After Midnight"	Alan Block, Don Hecht	Patsy Cline	1:57
2.	"The Blizzard"	Harlan Howard	Jim Reeves	3:25
3.	"Why Can't He Be You"	Hank Cochran	Patsy Cline	3:30
4.	"Distant Drums"	Cindy Walker	Jim Reeves	2:55
5.	"Leavin' on Your Mind"	Webb Pierce, Wayne Walker	Patsy Cline	2:27

== Personnel ==
- William Paul "Willie" Ackerman — drums
- Bill Harris - engineer
- Chet Atkins — producer
- Harold Bradley — electric bass
- Owen Bradley — producer, electric bass
- David Briggs — piano
- Jerry Carrigan — drums
- John Christopher Jr. — acoustic guitar
- Patsy Cline — lead vocals
- Floyd Cramer — organ, piano, vibraphone
- Ray Edenton — rhythm guitar
- Bob Ferguson — producer
- Hank Garland — guitar
- Buddy Harman — drums
- Walter Haynes — steel guitar
- Randy Hughes — rhythm guitar
- Leo Jackson — electric guitar
- Joe Jenkins — bass, bass guitar
- James Kirkland — bass
- Mike Leech — bass
- Rufus Long — flute
- John D. Loudermilk — guitar
- Dean Manuel — piano
- Grady Martin — electric guitar
- Bob Moore — bass, acoustic bass
- Weldon Myrick — steel guitar
- Bill Pursell — organ, piano
- Jim Reeves — guitar, lead vocals
- Hargus "Pig" Robbins — piano
- Mel Rogers — drums
- Velma Smith — guitar
- James Stroud — drums
- Rita Faye Wilson — autoharp
- Reggie Young — electric guitar

=== Background vocals ===
- Dolores Edgin
- Hoyt Hawkins — background vocals
- The Jordanaires — background vocals
- Anita Kerr Singers
- Anita Kerr
- Buddy Killen
- Millie Kirkham
- Hugh Jarett — background vocals
- Neal Matthews Jr.
- Louis Dean Nunley
- Gordon Stoker
- Ray C. Walker
- Duane West
- Gill Wright

== Chart positions ==
Singles - Billboard (North America)

Year	Single	Chart	Position
1982	"I Fall to Pieces"	Country Singles	54
1982	"I Fall to Pieces"	Canadian Country RPM singles	41
