= The Ultimate Collection (1998 Patsy Cline album) =

Ultimate Collection

Compilation album by Patsy Cline
- Released: February 3, 1998
- Recorded: 1955–1961
- Genre: Country
- Length: 73:13
- Label: Crimson Productions

Patsy Cline chronology
Live at the Cimarron Ballroom (1997)	Ultimate Collection (1998)	The Definitive Collection (2004)

Professional ratings
Review scores
Source	Rating
Allmusic	3/5 stars

Ultimate Collection is a 1998 album by Patsy Cline.

== Track listing ==
1. "Walkin' After Midnight" – 2:35
2. "A Church, a Courtroom, and Then Goodbye" – 3:03
3. "Lovesick Blues" – 2:19
4. "Honky Tonk Merry Go Round" – 2:21
5. "Three Cigarettes in an Ashtray" – 2:15
6. "The Heart You Break May Be Your Own" – 2:32
7. "Cry Not for Me" – 2:30
8. "In Care of the Blues" – 2:33
9. "Don't Ever Leave Me Again" – 2:27
10. "A Stranger in My Arms" – 2:28
11. "Too Many Secrets" – 2:17
12. "Today, Tomorrow and Forever" – 2:38
13. "Pick Me Up on Your Way Down" – 2:18
14. "Gotta Lot of Rhythm in My Soul" – 2:21
15. "Just Out of Reach" – 2:30
16. "I Can See an Angel" – 2:22
17. "A Poor Man's Roses (Or a Rich Man's Gold)" – 2:36
18. "I'm Blue Again" – 2:10
19. "Just a Closer Walk With Thee" – 2:48
20. "Hungry for Love" – 2:30
21. "Ain't No Wheels on This Ship" – 1:55
22. "Never No More" – 2:38
23. "Let the Teardrops Fall" – 2:34
24. "Love, Love, Love Me, Honey Do" – 2:04
25. "There He Goes" – 2:25
26. "I Don't Wanna" – 2:25
27. "I Cried All the Way to the Altar" – 2:23
28. "How Can I Face Tomorrow" – 2:17
29. "I've Loved and Lost Again" – 2:36
30. "Stop, Look and Listen" – 2:23

== Chart performance ==
Chart (2000)	Peak position
U.S. Billboard Top Country Albums	49
