= Today, Tomorrow, and Forever (Patsy Cline album) =

Compilation album by Patsy Cline
- Released: 1985
- Recorded: June 1, 1955 – January 9, 1959
- Genre: Country
- Label: MCA Records
- Producer: Owen Bradley

Patsy Cline chronology
Remembering Patsy Cline & Jim Reeves (1982)	Today, Tomorrow, and Forever (1985)	Heartaches (1985)

Professional ratings
Review scores
Source	Rating
AllMusic	2/5 stars

Today, Tomorrow, and Forever is an album released after Patsy Cline's death in 1963.

This album showed a handful of songs recorded from 1950s sessions working under the record company 4 Star Records. It includes her lesser-known material from the label, including the title track, "Let the Teadrops Fall," and "I Love You Honey." The album contained both stereo and monophonic recordings. It was issued on a CD in 1988. The album was produced by Cline's original producer at Decca Records, Owen Bradley. It was also released on Pickwick sub label "Hilltop" Records. The Hilltop version also includes an original version of "Walkin' After Midnight" (with different artwork on cover).

Try Again was written by Bob Summers and Jerry Le Fors and originally released by Patsy Cline on May 27, 1957.

== Track listing ==
Side 1:

1. "Today, Tomorrow and Forever" — 2:34
2. "Love, Love, Love Me Honey Do" — 2:04
3. "I Can See an Angel" — 2:20
4. "Let the Teardrops Fall" — 2:23
5. "I've Loved and Lost Again" — 2:31
6. "Honky Tonk Merry Go Round" — 2:20

Side 2:

1. "I'm Blue Again" — 2:08
2. "If I Could Only Stay Asleep" — 2:36
3. "I Love You, Honey" — 2:16
4. "Try Again" — 1:56
5. "I'm Moving Along" — 2:06
6. "Gotta Lot of Rhythm in My Soul" — 2:21

Track Listing, Hilltop version (JM-6001) Side One 1. Walkin' After Midnight 2. A Poor Man's Roses 3. Today, Tomorrow & Forever 4. I Don't Wanna 5. Just Out of Reach 6. Love Me, Love Me Honey Do

Side Two 1. A Church, A Courtroom, Then Goodbye 2. Don't Ever Leave Me Again 3. I'm Blue Again 4. Yes, I Understand 5. Fingerprints 6. Then You'll Know
