= Faded Love (album) =

Compilation album by Patsy Cline
- Released: 1988
- Recorded: August 17, 1961 – February 7, 1963
- Genre: Country
- Label: MCA
- Producer: Allen Reynolds, Don Williams

Patsy Cline chronology
Songwriter's Tribute (1986)	Faded Love (1988)	The Last Sessions (1988)

Professional ratings
Review scores
Source	Rating
AllMusic	3/5 stars

Faded Love is a compilation album released by American country music artist, Patsy Cline. The album was released in 1988 under MCA Records and was produced by Allen Reynolds and Don Williams. It was the second compilation MCA released in 1988.

== Background ==
Faded Love is a ten-track collection of songs by Patsy Cline under her second record label, Decca Records. The songs varied from Country and Pop music standards such as the title track and "Anytime," as well as previously unrecorded material such as "Imagine That" and "When You Need a Laugh." The album's title track originally peaked at No. 7 on the Billboard Magazine Hot Country Songs chart and No. 96 on the Billboard Pop Chart in 1963. In addition "He Called Me Baby" peaked at No. 23 on the Billboard Country Chart in 1964. The album was issued on a compact disc at the time of its release. In 1995, the album was reissued on Universal Special Products. Faded Love was on the first Patsy Cline MCA compilations to ever be released on a CD instead of a record.

== Track listing ==
No.	Title	Writer(s)	Length
1.	"Imagine That"	Justin Tubb	2:53
2.	"When You Need a Laugh"	Hank Cochran	2:48
3.	"Anytime"	Herbert "Happy" Lawson	1:58
4.	"Faded Love"	Bob Wills	3:43
5.	"The Wayward Wind"	Stanley Lebowsky, Herb Newman	3:20
6.	"Your Cheatin' Heart"	Hank Williams	2:40
7.	"He Called Me Baby"	Harlan Howard	2:40
8.	"A Poor Man's Roses (Or a Rich Man's Gold)"	Milton DeLugg, Bob Hillard	2:35
9.	"Seven Lonely Days"	Marshall Brown, Alden Shuman, Early Shuman	2:11
10.	"You Belong to Me"	Pee Wee King, Chilton Price, Redd Stewart	3:03

== Personnel ==
- Byron Bach – cello
- Brenton Banks – violin
- George Binkly III – violin
- Harold Bradley – electric bass
- John Bright – viola
- Cecil Brower – viola
- Howard Carpenter – violin
- Patsy Cline – lead vocals
- Floyd Cramer – organ
- Ray Edenton – rhythm guitar
- Walter Haynes – steel guitar
- Buddy Harman – drums
- Randy Hughes – acoustic guitar
- The Jordanaires – background vocals
- Lillian Hunt – violin
- Martin Kathan – violin
- Grady Martin – electric guitar
- Wayne Moss – electric bass
- Bob Moore – double bass
- Suzanne Parker – violin
- Bill Pursell – organ
- Verne Richardson – violin
- Hargus "Pig" Robbins – piano
- Gary Williams – violin
