= Live at the Opry =

Live album by Patsy Cline
- Released: April 4, 1988
- Recorded: June 16, 1956 – March 23, 1962
- Genre: Country
- Length: 28:34
- Label: MCA
- Producer: The Country Music Foundation

Patsy Cline chronology
The Last Sessions (1988)	Live at the Opry (1988)	Dreaming... (1988)

Live at the Opry is a live album by American country music artist, Patsy Cline. The album was released April 4, 1988 on MCA Records and was produced by The Country Music Foundation. The album consists of transcript recordings from several appearances Cline made on the Grand Ole Opry between 1956 and 1962.

== Background ==
Live at the Opry is derived from transcript recordings Patsy Cline made between June 16, 1956, and March 23, 1962, on the Grand Ole Opry. The live album consists of twelve tracks of live material, which includes three of her major hits between 1957 and 1962: "Walkin' After Midnight," "I Fall to Pieces," "Crazy," and "She's Got You." According to AllMusic reviewer, Mike Henderson Cline sings a "wide variety" of songs on the album, such as Rock and Roll, Jazz, Traditional Pop, and Tin Pan Alley. Cline includes a cover version of Carl Smith's "Loose Talk" (which she had never recorded) and Hank Williams's "Lovesick Blues." The album also includes five additional songs from her years at 4 Star Records, such as her debut single, "A Church, a Courtroom, and Goodbye," "There He Goes," and "How Can I Face Tomorrow."

Originally released on a vinyl record in 1988, the album was soon available on compact disc and cassette. The cover photograph was taken by WSM staff photographer Les Leverett. The original disc transfers and album remastering was done by transfer engineer Alan Stoker of the Country Music Foundation. The CD was digitally remastered by Glenn Meadows, Milan Bogdan, Jim Loyd and Benny Quinn at Masterfonics. Upon its release, the album peaked at No. 60 on the Billboard Magazine Top Country Albums chart.

== Critical reception ==
Professional ratings
Review scores
Source	Rating
AllMusic	3/5 stars
Rolling Stone	4/5 stars

Live at the Opry garnered mixed reviews from music critics. David Handelman of Rolling Stone gave the album four out of five stars, calling the release "a flawless testament to a career that, though cut short by a plane crash, is sure to endure forever." Handelamn praised the tracks "Walkin' After Midnight" and "I Fall to Pieces," comparing Cline's vocal styles to a waitress who knows "she's pouring the world's best coffee." He further praised her overall performance, stating, "As the Country Music Foundation's Jay Orr points out in the excellent liner notes, on a few numbers Cline sounds pleasantly surprised at her own performance, letting out delighted snarls and yelps."

Live at the Opry also was given a less favorable review by Mike Henderson of Allmusic, who gave the effort three out of five stars. Henderson begins the review by explaining his criticisms, saying, "Even if Live at the Opry had been extremely disappointing, there would have been an audience for this 28-minute CD. Cline, after all, went down in history as one of country's all-time greats (despite having a much too short career), and her more obsessive fans would have welcomed the arrival of this release regardless of the quality." Henderson, however, did comment that the album was "generally rewarding," even if some of the tracks were "imperfect and brief." The reviewer finally concluded by stating, "Those with a casual interest in Cline's legacy would be better off with a collection of her best-known studio recordings, but for the seasoned Cline enthusiast, Live at the Opry has a lot to offer – imperfections and all."

== Track listing ==
Side one
No.	Title	Writer(s)	Length
1.	"A Church, a Courtroom, and Goodbye"	Eddie Miller, W.S. Stevenson	3:16
2.	"I've Loved and Lost Again"	Miller	2:28
3.	"Walkin' After Midnight"	Alan Block, Don Hecht	2:23
4.	"Lovesick Blues"	Cliff Friend, Irving Mills	2:06
5.	"How Can I Face Tomorrow"	Charles Beam, Charles L. Jiles, Stevenson	1:58
6.	"Loose Talk"	Freddie Hart, Ann Lucas	1:40

Side two
No.	Title	Writer(s)	Length
1.	"Crazy Dreams"	Beam, Jiles, Stevenson	2:00
2.	"There He Goes"	Durwood Haddock, Miller, Stevenson	2:17
3.	"Lovin' in Vain"	Hart	1:38
4.	"I Fall to Pieces"	Hank Cochran, Harlan Howard	3:03
5.	"She's Got You"	Cochran	2:52
6.	"Crazy"	Willie Nelson	2:19

== Personnel ==
- Patsy Cline – lead vocals
- The Jordanaires – background vocals
- Little Jimmy Dickens – speaker, speech
- Ray Price – speech, speaking part
- Jim Reeves – speech, speaking part
- Hank Snow – speech, speaking part

=== Technical personnel ===
- Milan Bogdan – mastering, digital transfers
- The Country Music Foundation – producer
- Jerry Joyner – design
- Les Leverett – photography
- Simon Levy – art direction
- Jim Lloyd – mastering, digital transfers
- Glenn Meadows – mastering, digital transfers
- Jay Orr – liner notes
- Ronnie Pugh – programming
- Benny Quinn – mastering, digital transfers
- Alan Stoker – original disc transfer and remastering

== Charts ==
Chart (1988)	Peak Position
Billboard Top Country Albums	60
