= Here's Patsy Cline =

Compilation album by Patsy Cline
- Released: July 5, 1965
- Recorded: May 23, 1957 – January 27, 1960
- Genre: Country
- Length: 25:20
- Label: Vocalion; MCA (re-release)
- Producer: Owen Bradley

Patsy Cline chronology
That's How a Heartache Begins (1964)	Here's Patsy Cline (1965)	Patsy Cline's Greatest Hits (1967)

Professional ratings
Review scores
Source	Rating
AllMusic	3/5 stars

Here's Patsy Cline is the third compilation album of music originally recorded by American country artist, Patsy Cline. The album consists of selected material Cline had recorded during her years at 4 Star Records.

== Background ==
Here's Patsy Cline contains ten tracks Patsy Cline had recorded at 4 Star Records between May 23, 1957, and January 27, 1960. Included on the first side of the recorded is an alternate version of "Yes, I Understand," as the original version had included Cline singing harmony on her lead vocals. Cover versions of "Stop the World (And Let Me Off)," "Life's Railway to Heaven," and "Just Out of Reach." The second side contained Cline's 1956 single, "I've Loved and Lost Again," as well as an alternate take of "How Can I Face Tomorrow," which also had originally included harmony.

Here's Patsy Cline has been reissued several times. In 1973, the album was reissued as a vinyl record on MCA/Coral Records, and then was then re-released in 1983 only on MCA. In 1988, the album was digitally remastered on a compact disc, also on MCA Records. The album was reviewed by AllMusic and was given three out of five stars. The release did not appear on any Billboard charts.

== Track listing ==
Side one
No.	Title	Writer(s)	Length
1.	"Stop the World (And Let Me Off)"	Carl Belew, W.S. Stevenson	2:26
2.	"Yes, I Understand"	Charles Beam, C.C. Beam, Charles L. Jiles, Stevenson	2:47
3.	"Just Out of Reach"	V.F. Stewart	2:28
4.	"Life's Railway to Heaven"	Charles Davis Tillman	2:51
5.	"If I Could See the World (Through the Eyes of a Child)"	Sammy Masters, Richard Pope, Tex Satterwhite	2:50

Side two
No.	Title	Writer(s)	Length
1.	"I've Loved and Lost Again"	Eddie Miller	2:31
2.	"(Write Me) In Care of the Blues"	Miller, Stevenson	2:32
3.	"How Can I Face Tomorrow"	Beam, Jiles, Stevenson	2:13
4.	"Just a Closer Walk with Thee"	traditional	2:42
5.	"Walking Dream"	Ginger Willis, Hal Willis	2:16

== Personnel ==
- Anita Kerr Singers – background vocals
- Harold Bradley – bass guitar, electric guitar
- Patsy Cline – lead vocals
- Farris Coursey – drums
- Floyd Cramer – piano
- Jimmy Day – steel guitar
- Grady Martin – guitar, rhythm guitar
- Bob Moore – acoustic bass
- W.S. Stevenson – arranger

=== Technical ===
- Milan Bogdan – mastering, remastering
- Owen Bradley – producer
- Jim Lloyd – mastering, remastering
- Glenn Meadows – mastering, remastering
- Benny Quinn – mastering, remastering
- Don Roy – liner notes
