= Songwriter's Tribute =

Compilation album by Patsy Cline
- Released: 1986
- Recorded: November 16, 1960 – February 7, 1963
- Genre: Country, traditional pop
- Length: 10:40
- Label: MCA

Patsy Cline chronology
Stop, Look & Listen (1986)	Songwriter's Tribute (1986)	Faded Love (1988)

Professional ratings
Review scores
Source	Rating
Allmusic	4/5 stars

Songwriter's Tribute is a 1986 compilation album released by MCA Records/Nashville covering the songs of American country music singer, Patsy Cline.

Songwriter's Tribute was released in 1986, and was put together by compilation producer/songwriter Diana Haig, who worked on six Patsy Cline collections during the 1980s.

Haig contacted each songwriter whose work was included on this album and asked these famed songwriters, including performing legends Willie Nelson and Carl Perkins, to give a brief account of how Miss Cline came to record their song. These statements are featured in the album's liner notes, and Patsy Cline's personality comes to life through the recollections of these seasoned songwriters.

The album includes hit songs by songwriters, Harlan Howard, Hank Cochran, Freddie Hart, and Willie Nelson.

The album includes three hit singles by Cline; "Crazy," "So Wrong," and "Imagine That." It also includes songs from previous albums including "Your Kinda Love," "I Love You So Much it Hurts," and "You're Stronger Than Me." It also includes the B-sides of her previous hits, such as the B-side of her 1961 hit, "I Fall to Pieces" titled, "Lovin' in Vain," the first track on this album.

The album gained a positive view by critics from Allmusic, giving the album four out of five stars.

== Track listing ==
1. "Lovin' in Vain" – (Freddie Hart)
2. "Crazy" – (Willie Nelson)
3. "I Love You So Much it Hurts" – (Floyd Tillman)
4. "You're Stronger Than Me" – (Hank Cochran, Jimmy Key)
5. "Imagine That" – (Justin Tubb)
6. "So Wrong" – (Danny Dill, Carl Perkins, Mel Tillis)
7. "When You Need a Laugh" – (Cochran)
8. "Your Kinda Love" – (Roy Drusky)
9. "That's How a Heartache Begins" – (Harlan Howard)
10. "He Called My Baby" – (Howard)
11. "You Took Him Off My Hands" – (Howard, Skeets McDonald, Wynn Stewart)
