= Stop, Look & Listen (Patsy Cline album) =

Compilation album by Patsy Cline
- Released: 1986
- Genre: Country
- Label: MCA
- Producer: Owen Bradley

Patsy Cline chronology
Sweet Dreams (1985)	Stop, Look & Listen (1986)	Songwriter's Tribute (1986)

Professional ratings
Review scores
Source	Rating
AllMusic	2/5 stars

Stop, Look & Listen is a compilation album released in 1986 consisting of songs recorded by country music artist, Patsy Cline. The album was released on MCA Records.

Stop, Look & Listen was a collection of songs recorded by Patsy Cline at her first record label, 4 Star Records. It was released originally on a record but was then reissued on a CD format in 1988. It included some songs that were released as singles, such as "Three Cigarettes (In an Ashtray)" and "Ain't No Wheels on This Ship." It also included two songs from her second record label, Decca; "Shoes" and the remake of "A Poor Man's Roses (Or a Rich Man's Gold)."

== Track listing ==
Side 1:

1. "Ain't No Wheels on This Ship" — 2:34
2. "Never No More" — 2:04
3. "(Write Me) In Care of the Blues" — 2:20
4. "Three Cigarettes (In an Ashtray)" — 2:23
5. "Just Out of Reach (Of My Two Open Arms)" — 2:31
6. "Too Many Secrets" — 2:20

Side 2:

1. "Turn the Cards Slowly" — 2:08
2. "If I Could See the World (Through the Eyes of a Child)" — 2:36
3. "Don't Ever Leave Me Again" — 2:16
4. "Stop, Look and Listen" — 1:56
5. "Shoes" — 2:06
  - 1961 remake
6. "A Poor Man's Roses (Or a Rich Man's Gold)" — 2:21
  - 1961 remake
