= Live at the Cimarron Ballroom =

Live album by Patsy Cline
- Released: July 29, 1997
- Recorded: July 29, 1961
- Genre: Country pop
- Label: MCA

Patsy Cline chronology
| The Patsy Cline Collection (1991) | Live at the Cimarron Ballroom (1997) | The Ultimate Collection (1998) |

Live at the Cimarron Ballroom is a live album by country singer Patsy Cline performing live in 1961. It was released by MCA Records in 1997.

The album was recorded at a concert held at the Cimarron Ballroom at West 4th Street and South Denver Avenue in Tulsa, Oklahoma on July 29, 1961. The album features Cline singing some of her biggest hits live in concert, including her number #1 hit at the time, "I Fall to Pieces". It also includes Cline singing a few songs she previously recorded, such as "Lovesick Blues", "There He Goes" and her 1957 hit "Walkin' After Midnight". This album also features some songs Cline never recorded, like "When My Dreamboat Comes Home", and her version of the Connie Francis hit "Stupid Cupid". It also includes Cline talking to her audience about the car accident she was involved in about a month before.

Professional ratings
Review scores
| Source | Rating |
|---|---|
| Allmusic | link |

== Track listing ==
1. "Come On In" (1:38)
2. "A Poor Man's Roses (Or a Rich Man's Gold)" (3:08)
3. "Bill Bailey, Won't You Please Come Home" (2:00)
4. Dialog (Patsy with dialog) (0:32)
5. "I Fall to Pieces" (3:18)
6. "Lovesick Blues" (1:56)
7. Dialog II (Patsy with dialog)
8. "Shake, Rattle & Roll" (2:22)
9. "There He Goes" (3:00)
10. "San Antonio Rose" (2:28) (Brief intermission following Patsy singing)
11. Patsy talks to audience about car accident (1:57)
12. "Stupid Cupid" (2:25)
13. "I Fall to Pieces" (3:16)
14. "If I Could See the World (Through the Eyes of a Child)" (1:51)
15. "Walkin' After Midnight" (2:31)
16. "Foolin' Around" (3:36)
17. "When My Dreamboat Comes Home" (4:13) (Includes Patsy and announcer ending show)

== Chart performance ==
| Chart (1997) | Peak position |
|---|---|
| U.S. Billboard Top Country Albums | 32 |

== Personnel ==
- Leon McAuliffe - band leader, steel guitar, vocals
- Billy Dozier - electric guitar
- Richard Dozier - drums
- Pee Wee Calhoun - piano
- Bob White - fiddle
- Curly Lewis - fiddle
- Jack Lloyd - saxophone, clarinet
- Joe Allen - bass
