= A Portrait of Patsy Cline =

Studio album by Patsy Cline
- Released: June 15, 1964
- Recorded: August 24, 1961–February 7, 1963
- Genre: Country, traditional pop
- Length: 31:30
- Label: Decca (1963); MCA (1973, 1988)
- Producer: Owen Bradley

Patsy Cline chronology
The Patsy Cline Story (1963)	A Portrait of Patsy Cline (1964)	That's How a Heartache Begins (1964)

Singles from A Portrait of Patsy Cline
- 1. "Faded Love" Released: August 5, 1963; 2. "When You Need a Laugh" Released: October 28, 1963; 3. "Your Kinda Love" Released: February 20, 1964

A Portrait of Patsy Cline is a 1964 compilation album containing lesser-known recordings by American country music singer Patsy Cline. It was released on June 15, 1964, on Decca Records, and would later be reissued twice by Decca's successor, MCA Records.

== Background ==
A Portrait contained Patsy Cline's less-familiar recordings, including country and pop standards. The album's highlights includes her cover versions of "Faded Love" and "Blue Moon of Kentucky". A Portrait of Patsy Cline would be one of a string of posthumous released Decca and later MCA records would release. It was released a little over a year after Cline was killed in a plane crash. The album spawned three singles that were released to country radio between 1963 and 1964: "Faded Love," (which was a Top ten hit), "When You Need a Laugh" and "Your Kinda Love".

In 1973, the album was reissued by MCA Records (Decca's successor), then digitally remastered and reissued on CD/LP/Cassette in 1988. It was also released in the UK by Brunswick Records in 1964, as well as Australia and New Zealand by Festival Records the same year. The album was one of two Patsy Cline albums released by Decca Records in 1964. The other was That's How a Heartache Begins, released shortly after.

Professional ratings
Review scores
Source	Rating
Allmusic	link

== Track listing ==
=== Side one ===
1. "Faded Love" (Bob Wills, John Wills) - 3:43
2. "I'll Sail My Ship Alone" (Henry Bernard, Morry Burns, Lois Mann, Henry Thurston) - 2:20
3. "When You Need a Laugh" (Hank Cochran) - 2:45
4. "Crazy Arms" (Ralph Mooney, Chuck Seals) - 2:23
5. "Always" (Irving Berlin) - 2:40
6. "When I Get Thru with You" (Harlan Howard) - 2:34

=== Side two ===
1. "Blue Moon of Kentucky" (Bill Monroe) - 2:02
2. "Someday (You'll Want Me to Want You)" (Jimmie Hodges) - 2:49
3. "Who Can I Count On" (Sammy Masters) - 2:14
4. "You Took Him Off My Hands" (Howard, Skeets McDonald, Wynn Stewart) - 2:58
5. "Your Kinda Love" (Roy Drusky) - 2:29
6. "Does Your Heart Beat for Me" (Arnold Johnson, Russ Morgan, Mitchell Parish) - 2:37

== Personnel ==
- Harold Bradley - electric guitar
- Owen Bradley - producer
- Patsy Cline - vocals
- Floyd Cramer - piano, organ
- Ray Edenton - rhythm guitar
- Buddy Harman - drums
- Hoyt Hawkins - backing vocals
- Randy Hughes - rhythm guitar
- Joe Jenkins - bass
- Grady Martin - electric guitar
- Neal Matthews - backing vocals
- Bob Moore - bass
- Wayne Moss - electric bass
- Bill Pursell - vibraphone
- Hargus "Pig" Robbins - piano
- Gordon Stoker - backing vocals
- Ray C. Walker - backing vocals
- Rita Faye Wilson - autoharp

== Chart positions ==
Singles - Billboard (North America)

Year	Single	Chart	Position
1963	"Faded Love"	Country Singles	7
1963	"Faded Love"	Pop Singles	96
1963	"When You Need a Laugh"	Country Singles	47
