= Why Can't He Be You =

1962 single by Patsy Cline

Single by Patsy Cline
- B-side: "Heartaches"
- Released: October 8, 1962
- Recorded: September 5, 1962
- Studio: Bradley's Barn, Mt. Juliet, Tennessee
- Genre: Country
- Length: 3:21
- Label: Decca
- Songwriter: Hank Cochran
- Producer: Owen Bradley

Patsy Cline singles chronology
"So Wrong" (1962)	""Heartaches" / "Why Can't He Be You"" (1962)	"Leavin' on Your Mind" (1963)

"Why Can't He Be You"' is a song written by Hank Cochran that was originally recorded by American country artist Patsy Cline. The song became a minor chart hit, and was later included on Cline's Greatest Hits album. It has since been notably covered by Loretta Lynn, Norah Jones and also by The Mavericks as "Why Can't She Be You".

== Patsy Cline version ==
Patsy Cline first recorded the song on September 5, 1962 at the Bradley Film and Recording Studio in Nashville, Tennessee, United States. The session was produced by Owen Bradley and among the other tracks recorded by Cline that day was the single "Leavin' on Your Mind" and the song "Your Kinda Love".

"Why Can't He Be You" was released as the B-side to Cline's 1962 single, "Heartaches". While the A-side reached number 73 on the Billboard Hot 100, "Why Can't He Be You" reached a peak position on the Billboard Bubbling Under Hot 100 singles chart, stalling at number seven. The song did not appear on an official album until the release of Patsy Cline's Greatest Hits record in 1967.

=== Track listings ===
- "Heartaches" – 2:08
- "Why Can't He Be You" – 3:21

=== Charts ===
Chart (1962)	Peak position
US Bubbling Under Hot 100 (Billboard)	7

== Loretta Lynn version ==
"Why Can't He Be You"

Single by Loretta Lynn

from the album I Remember Patsy
- B-side: "I Keep on Putting On"
- Released: May 1977
- Recorded: September 28, 1976
- Studio: Bradley's Barn, Mount Juliet, Tennessee, US
- Genre: Country
- Length: 3:40
- Label: MCA
- Songwriter: Hank Cochran
- Producer: Owen Bradley

Loretta Lynn singles chronology
"She's Got You" (1977)	"Why Can't He Be You" (1977)	"Out of My Head and Back in My Bed" (1977)

Among the many covers of the song, American country music artist Loretta Lynn recorded the song and released it as a single in 1977. Lynn recorded the song as a tribute to Patsy Cline because the pair had a close friendship. "Why Can't Be You" was recorded at Bradley's Barn studio in Mount Juliet, Tennessee on September 28, 1976. The recording session was produced by the studio's owner, renowned country music producer Owen Bradley. Two additional tracks were recorded during this session that were covers of Cline's music: "Back in Baby's Arms" and "Leavin' on Your Mind".

"Why Can't He Be You" reached number seven on the Billboard Hot Country Singles survey in 1977. Additionally, the song peaked at number six on the Canadian RPM Country Songs chart during this same period. It was included on her studio album of Patsy Cline covers, I Remember Patsy (1977).

=== Track listings ===
- "Why Can't He Be You" – 3:40
- "I Keep on Putting On" – 2:46

=== Charts ===
Chart (1977)	Peak position
Canada Country Songs (RPM)	6
US Hot Country Singles (Billboard)	7
