= Sweet Dreams (1985 film) =

1985 film by Karel Reisz

- Theatrical release poster
- Directed by: Karel Reisz
- Written by: Robert Getchell
- Produced by: Bernard Schwartz
- Starring: Jessica Lange; Ed Harris; Ann Wedgeworth; David Clennon
- Cinematography: Robbie Greenberg
- Edited by: Malcolm Cooke
- Music by: Charles Gross
- Production companies: HBO Pictures; Silver Screen Partners
- Distributed by: Tri-Star Pictures
- Release date: October 4, 1985
- Running time: 115 minutes
- Country: United States
- Language: English
- Budget: $13.5 million
- Box office: $9.1 million

Sweet Dreams is a 1985 American biographical drama film which tells the story of country music singer Patsy Cline.

The film was directed by Karel Reisz, written by Robert Getchell, and stars Jessica Lange, Ed Harris, Ann Wedgeworth, David Clennon, James Staley, Gary Basaraba, John Goodman, and P. J. Soles.

The film was nominated for Academy Award for Best Actress (Jessica Lange). For all the musical sequences, Lange lip-synced to the original Patsy Cline recordings. The soundtrack was released in September 1985.

== Plot ==
Patsy Cline, unhappily married and planning to divorce, is playing small-time gigs in the tri-state area of Virginia, West Virginia, and Maryland when she meets Charlie Dick, whose charm and aggressive self-confidence catch her attention. After her divorce, Patsy and Charlie marry, and she is free to pursue music and, later, focus on raising their children. After Charlie is drafted into the U.S. Army, Patsy focuses on singing more, and after joining forces with manager Randy Hughes, she becomes a rising star on the country music scene.

However, Patsy's success fuels her self-confidence, much to Charlie's annoyance, and he becomes increasingly physically and emotionally abusive as Patsy attempts to assert her independence. Patsy is at the peak of her popularity as one of the first great female stars of country music when she is killed in a plane crash on March 5, 1963, at the age of 30.

== Cast ==
- Jessica Lange as Patsy Cline
- Ed Harris as Charlie Dick, Patsy's husband
- Ann Wedgeworth as Hilda Patterson Hensley, Patsy's mother
- David Clennon as Randy Hughes, Patsy's manager and pilot of the ill-fated aircraft in which they, Cowboy Copas and Hawkshaw Hawkins were killed
- James Staley as Gerald Cline, Patsy's first husband
- Gary Basaraba as Woodhouse
- John Goodman as Otis
- P.J. Soles as Wanda
- Jerry Haynes as Legendary Nashville Producer Owen Bradley
- Boxcar Willie as Man In Jail With Charlie

== Production ==
Many actresses wanted the role of Patsy Cline, including Meryl Streep, but she was turned down, one of three times the actress was denied a role. Jessica Lange was eventually signed on for the role, and has said that making the film was a very enjoyable experience for her. Lange did not do any of her own singing in the film; instead the actress lip-synced to Cline's original recordings. This practice was notably used 33 years earlier, when Susan Hayward lip-synced to Jane Froman's vocals in 20th Century Fox's production of With a Song in My Heart. The film was originally to be titled I Fall to Pieces, after Cline's signature song, before the producers eventually changed it to Sweet Dreams.

== Historical inaccuracies ==
Many events depicted in the film are not accurate to the actual historical events. Leading up to the famous car crash, Patsy was not in fact buying beer, but actually going to pick up material for her mother to make new costumes for her shows. The most blatantly inaccurate sequence is the fatal plane crash that took Cline's life. In the film, the plane is seen striking the side of a mountain and exploding on impact. In reality, the small aircraft crashed into a forest, hitting trees which ripped the plane apart on the way down. It is also important to note that there is no evidence of mechanical issues leading up to the crash; it is more likely that it was simply the heavy fog from area thunderstorms that caused pilot Randy Hughes to experience spatial disorientation, causing him to lose control of the plane, as Hughes was not instrument-rated.

Patsy's mother Hilda Hensley was not a fan of the film, speaking publicly against it in several interviews.

== Reception ==
Noted film critic Roger Ebert gave the film two out of four stars, writing:

There isn't the sense of a well-shaped structure in this movie; there's no clear idea of what the filmmakers thought about Patsy Cline, or what thoughts her life is supposed to inspire.

Metacritic gave the film a 65 rating.

The film is recognized by American Film Institute in these lists:

- 2004: AFI's 100 Years...100 Songs:
  - "Crazy" – Nominated

As of April 2021, the film holds a rating of 90% rating on Rotten Tomatoes from 20 reviews.

== Awards and nominations ==
Award	Category	Nominee(s)	Result
Academy Awards	Best Actress	Jessica Lange	Nominated
National Society of Film Critics Awards	Best Actress	Jessica Lange	Nominated
National Society of Film Critics Awards	Best Supporting Actress	Ann Wedgeworth	Nominated

== See also ==
- Coal Miner's Daughter-1980 Oscar-winning film about Loretta Lynn
