= That's How a Heartache Begins =

Compilation album by Patsy Cline
- Released: November 2, 1964
- Recorded: January 8, 1959 – February 7, 1963
- Genre: Country, traditional pop
- Length: 31:30
- Label: Decca
- Producer: Owen Bradley

Patsy Cline chronology
A Portrait of Patsy Cline (1964)	That's How a Heartache Begins (1964)	Here's Patsy Cline (1965)

Singles from That's How a Heartache Begins
- 1. "That's How a Heartache Begins"; 2. "He Called Me Baby"

Professional ratings
Review scores
Source	Rating
AllMusic	3/5 stars

That's How a Heartache Begins is a 1964 compilation album consisting of songs recorded by American country music singer, Patsy Cline. The album was released by Decca Records on November 2, 1964.

== Background ==
That's How a Heartache Begins contains songs Patsy Cline recorded under Decca and 4 Star Records between 1959 and 1963. The album includes cover versions of "Bill Bailey Won't You Please Come Home" and Hank Williams' "Lovesick Blues". There is also other material by Hank Cochran and Harlan Howard who wrote some of Cline's most famous hits, including "I Fall to Pieces," "Crazy," and "She's Got You". Unlike any other album before released by Decca, the record label did not reissue the album when the label changed from the Decca name to the MCA name in 1973. However, the album was issued in Australia and New Zealand in 1964 by Festival Records. The album spawned two singles, the title track and "He Called Me Baby," which peaked at No. 23 on the US Country Chart in 1964. The album as a whole did not chart among any album charts.

== Track listing ==
Side 1

1. "Love Letters in the Sand" – 2:25 (J. Fred Coots, Charles F. Kenny, Nick A. Kenny)
2. "Bill Bailey, Won't You Please Come Home" – 2:43 (Hughie Cannon)
3. "Shoes" – 2:24 (Hank Cochran, Velma Smith)
4. "Lovesick Blues" – 2:25 (Cliff Friend, Irving Mills)
5. "Lovin' in Vain" – 2:24 (Freddie Hart)
6. "I'm Moving Along" – (Johnny Star)

Side 2

1. "That's How a Heartache Begins" – 2:22 (Harlan Howard)
2. "He Called Me Baby" – 2:20 (Howard)
3. "There He Goes" – 2:25 (Durwood Haddock, Eddie Miller, W.S. Stevenson)
4. "Crazy Dreams" – 2:30 (Charles Beam, Charles L. Jiles, Stevenson)
5. "I'm Blue Again" – 2:09 (Beam, Jiles, Stevenson)
6. "Love, Love, Love Me Honey Do" – 2:03 (Beam, Jiles, Stevenson)

== Personnel ==
- Byron Bach – cello
- Brenton Banks – violin
- George Binkley III – violin
- Harold Bradley – electric bass
- Owen Bradley – producer
- Cecil Brower – viola
- Howard Carpenter – violin
- Patsy Cline – vocals
- Floyd Cramer – piano
- Ray Edenton – rhythm guitar
- Jimmy Day – steel guitar
- Solie Fott – violin
- Hank Garland – electric guitar
- Buddy Harman – drums
- Randy Hughes – acoustic guitar
- Lillian Hunt – violin
- The Jordanaires – background vocals
- Mark Kathan – violin
- Ben Keith – steel guitar
- Doug Kirkham – drums
- Grady Martin – electric guitar, fiddle
- Bob Moore – acoustic bass
- Wayne Moss – electric bass
- Mildred Onk – violin
- Verne Richardson – violin
- Hargus "Pig" Robbins – piano
- Michael Semanitzky – violin
- Wilda Tinsley – violin
- Gary Williams – violin

== Chart positions ==
Singles - Billboard (North America)

Year	Single	Chart	Position
1964	"He Called Me Baby"	Country Singles	23
