= Sweet Dreams (Don Gibson song) =

Country music song

"Sweet Dreams" or "Sweet Dreams (of You)" is a country ballad, which was written by Don Gibson. Gibson originally recorded the song in 1955; his version hit the top ten of Billboard's country chart, but was eclipsed by the success of a competing recording by Faron Young. In 1960, after Gibson had established himself as a popular country musician, he released a new take as a single. This version also charted in the top ten on the country chart and also crossed over to the Billboard Hot 100, where it peaked at No. 93. The song has become a country standard, with other notable versions by Patsy Cline and Emmylou Harris.

== Chart performance ==
| Chart (1956) | Peak position |
|---|---|
| US Hot Country Songs (Billboard) | 9 |
| Chart (1960) | Peak position |
| US Hot Country Songs (Billboard) | 6 |
| US Billboard Hot 100 | 93 |

== Faron Young version ==
In the summer of 1956, Faron Young recorded "Sweet Dreams"; his version reached No. 2 on the country chart. It was this version that garnered Gibson his first recognition as a successful songwriter.

=== Chart performance ===
| Chart (1956) | Peak position |
|---|---|
| US Hot Country Songs (Billboard) | 2 |

== Patsy Cline version ==
"Sweet Dreams"

Single by Patsy Cline

from the album The Patsy Cline Story
- B-side: "Back in Baby's Arms"
- Published: December 28, 1955 Acuff-Rose Publications, Inc.
- Released: April 1963
- Recorded: February 5, 1963
- Studio: Bradley Studios, Nashville, Tennessee
- Genre: Country
- Length: 2:35
- Label: Decca
- Songwriter: Don Gibson
- Producer: Owen Bradley

Patsy Cline singles chronology
| "Leavin' On Your Mind" (1963) | "Sweet Dreams" (1963) | "Faded Love" (1963) |

In early 1963, Patsy Cline was recording songs for her next album, Faded Love, which was set for release in late March 1963. She recorded "Sweet Dreams" for the album on February 5. However, on March 5, Cline died in a plane crash upon returning home from a benefit in Kansas City, Missouri for the family of Cactus Jack Call, a disc jockey who was killed in an automobile accident; therefore, the album was never released. The songs were later compiled for the release Patsy Cline the Last Sessions in 1988.

In 1963, "Sweet Dreams" was released to the public and became a big crossover hit, making it to No. 5 on the country chart and to No. 44 on the pop music chart. It also peaked on the U.S. Adult Contemporary chart at No. 15. This song was followed by another which was planned for release on Cline's upcoming album Faded Love, which became a No. 7 hit.

It was said that Cline did not like the use of the violins that producer Owen Bradley was bringing into the song because she feared she was becoming too "pop" for her country audience. But upon hearing the playbacks the night she recorded it, she supposedly held up a copy of her first record and "Sweet Dreams" and proclaimed "Well, here it is: The first and the last". This quote came from the video called Remembering Patsy, and was quoted by Jan Howard whose husband at the time was Harlan Howard.

In 1985, the song became the title tune of a Patsy Cline biopic starring Jessica Lange as Cline. Cline's hit version of "Sweet Dreams" was included on the film's soundtrack, along with "Crazy", "She's Got You", and many of her other songs. The song also featured in Martin Scorsese's 2006 film The Departed, Asif Kapadia's 2006 film The Return, and the Coen Brothers' film Blood Simple.

=== Chart performance ===
| Chart (1963) | Peak position |
|---|---|
| US Hot Country Songs (Billboard) | 5 |
| US Billboard Hot 100 | 44 |
| U.S. Billboard Easy Listening | 15 |
| U.S. Cash Box Top 100 | 57 |
| Canada CHUM Chart | 32 |

== Tommy McLain version ==
The version to experience the most success on Billboard's pop chart is the one recorded by Tommy McLain. This version, released as a single in 1966, is the only one to have entered the top 40.

=== Chart history ===
| Chart (1966) | Peak position |
|---|---|
| Canada RPM | 7 |
| U.S. Billboard Hot 100 | 15 |

== Emmylou Harris version ==
"Sweet Dreams"

Single by Emmylou Harris

from the album Elite Hotel
- B-side: "Amarillo"
- Released: 1976
- Genre: Country
- Length: 4:03
- Label: Reprise
- Songwriter: Don Gibson
- Producer: Brian Ahern

Emmylou Harris singles chronology
| "One of These Days" (1976) | "Sweet Dreams" (1976) | "(You Never Can Tell) C'est La Vie" (1977) |

Emmylou Harris' 1975 recording is the most successful version on Billboard's country chart to date. The song first appeared on Harris' album Elite Hotel, and was released as the album's third single in the fall of 1976, reaching No. 1 in December. In Canada, it reached No. 1 in January 1977, and was No. 29 on the year-end chart.

== Reba McEntire version ==
"Sweet Dreams"

Single by Reba McEntire

from the album Out of a Dream
- B-side: "I'm a Woman"
- Released: 1979
- Genre: Country
- Length: 2:59
- Label: PolyGram/Mercury
- Songwriter: Don Gibson
- Producer: Jerry Kennedy

Reba McEntire singles chronology
| "That Makes Two of Us" (1979) | "Sweet Dreams" (1979) | "(I Still Long to Hold You) Now and Then" (1980) |

Reba McEntire recorded her version on Out of a Dream, her second album, in 1979. "Sweet Dreams" gave her her first solo top 20 hit, peaking at No. 19 on the Hot Country Songs chart. For many years until March 15, 1991, McEntire closed her concerts with an a cappella version.

=== Chart performance ===
| Chart (1979) | Peak position |
|---|---|
| U.S. Billboard Hot Country Singles | 19 |
| Canada RPM Country Singles | 44 |
