= Leavin' on Your Mind =

Single by Patsy Cline

from the album The Patsy Cline Story
- B-side: "Tre Le La Le Triangle"
- Released: January 7, 1963
- Recorded: September 5, 1962
- Studio: Bradley Studios, Nashville, Tennessee
- Genre: Country
- Length: 2:25
- Label: Decca
- Songwriters: Wayne Walker, Webb Pierce
- Producer: Owen Bradley

Patsy Cline singles chronology
"Heartaches" / "Why Can't He Be You" (1962)	"Leavin' on Your Mind" (1963)	"Sweet Dreams (of You)" (1963)

"Leavin' on Your Mind" is a country song written by Wayne Walker and Webb Pierce, first recorded by Canadian singer Joyce Smith in 1962.

Patsy Cline was in Owen Bradley's office one day, heard the record Smith made, and immediately wanted the song for herself. According to Smith, "He said, 'No you can't have it. I'm going to see what that Canadian gal does with it'." Smith's single, released in 1962, did not reach the top 40, but it sold more than 100,000 copies, a hit for a first record and enough that Smith recouped the studio expenses and made a little money in royalties.

Cline recorded the song later in 1962 at the Bradley Studios in Nashville, Tennessee and released it in 1963. It was her last single before she died in a plane crash in March of that year. Unlike her earlier hits "Crazy" and "I Fall to Pieces", "Leavin' On Your Mind" stalled at #83 on the Billboard Hot 100 chart. However, the song went to #8 on the Billboard country chart, and it remains a classic in country music.

Cline had planned to include the song on her upcoming album, called Faded Love, along with two other singles to be released that year. The album was not released as planned at the end of March because of her death. Instead, the song was included on a double compilation album called The Patsy Cline Story. The compilation featured all of Cline's big hits and is still in print.

== Chart performance ==
Chart (1963)	Peak position
U.S. Billboard Hot Country Singles	8
U.S. Billboard Hot 100	83
U.S. Cash Box Top 100	100

== Use in popular culture ==
The song was featured on the ABC drama series Lost in episode three of the first season entitled "Tabula Rasa".
