= Faded Love =

Single by Bob Wills and His Texas Playboys
- B-side: "Boot Heel Drag"
- Released: September 1950
- Genre: Western swing
- Label: MGM
- Songwriters: Bob Wills, John Wills, Billy Jack Wills

"Faded Love" is a Western swing song written by Bob Wills, his father John Wills, and his brother, Billy Jack Wills. The tune is considered to be an exemplar of the Western swing fiddle component of American fiddle.

The melody came from an 1856 ballad, "Darling Nelly Gray", which John Wills knew as a fiddle tune. "Faded Love" is a sentimental song about lost love. The name comes from the refrain that follows each verse: "I remember our faded love".

The song was a major hit for Bob Wills and the Texas Playboys (MGM 10786) reaching number eight on the country charts in 1950. It became one of his signature songs.

== Other versions ==
Leon McAuliffe had two top-40 hits with "Faded Love", both reaching number 22 (Cimarron 4057, 1962, and MGM 14249, 1971). The former was an instrumental version, and the latter rendition was a collaboration with Tompall & the Glaser Brothers. Also in 1962, it was a modest hit for Jackie DeShannon, reaching number 97 on the Billboard Hot 100.

The song had greater success when Patsy Cline covered it in 1963. Her single became a hit, reaching number seven on the U.S. Country charts and number 96 on the Billboard Hot 100. It was originally intended to be the title cut for a planned album, and was made at what turned out to be the last recording session before her death in an airplane crash. Instead, it was later released on A Portrait of Patsy Cline, along with other previously unreleased material, in 1964.

A recording made by Ray Price and Willie Nelson was the biggest hit version from a chart standpoint. Their duet version – which featured Crystal Gayle singing harmony on the chorus – reached number three on the Billboard Hot Country Singles chart in October 1980. The song, which came out at a time when Nelson was country music's biggest superstar, gave Price his first top-10 hit in more than five years and biggest hit in seven years.

Elvis Presley covered the song on his 1970 album Elvis Country (I'm 10,000 Years Old). The song was re-released as a B-side to "Guitar Man" in 1981 with new music under the direction of Felton Jarvis. Jerry Reed, the composer of the original "Guitar Man" song, and the guitarist on the 1967 Elvis session, recorded new guitar parts for both tracks.

In Gary P. Nunn's recording of Rick Cardwell's song "Dear John Letter Lounge," Nunn adds references to "Faded Love" at the end of the two choruses ("Yeah, I gotta go, but I want to hear 'Faded Love' one more time" and "Oh, I just love that 'Faded Love'") while the fiddles play the "Faded Love" melody. Then, after the second "Dear John Letter Lounge" chorus, Nunn and the band segue into the "Faded Love" chorus.
